= Floyd Cunningham =

American historian and ordained minister

5th President President of Asia-Pacific Nazarene Theological Seminary
- In office July 1, 2008 – April 3, 2013
- Preceded by: Hitoshi "Paul" Fukue
- Succeeded by: Seung-an "Abraham" Im

Personal details
- Born: Floyd Timothy Cunningham; September 22, 1954 (age 72) Washington, D.C., U.S.
- Education: Eastern Nazarene College; Nazarene Theological Seminary; Johns Hopkins University
- Profession: Educator missionary academic historian writer

Floyd Timothy Cunningham (born September 22, 1954) is an American historian and ordained minister, who has been a global missionary in the Philippines for the Church of the Nazarene since 1983, who served as the fifth president of Asia-Pacific Nazarene Theological Seminary from July 1, 2008, until April 3, 2013. Cunningham serves currently as Distinguished Professor of the History of Christianity at APNTS, and is the author of Holiness Abroad: Nazarene Missions in Asia, the editor and co-author of Our Watchword & Song: The Centennial History of the Church of the Nazarene, and the author of dozens of articles in academic journals and magazines. Cunningham is a Life member of the Philippine National Historical Society, a member of the American Society of Church History, the Wesleyan Theological Society, and the American Historical Association since 1980.

== Early life, family and education ==
Floyd Timothy Cunningham was born in Washington, D.C., on September 22, 1954, as the oldest of the three children of Floyd Enus Cunningham (born August 17, 1921, in Bethesda, Maryland; died September 7, 1992, in Montgomery County, Maryland), an auto parts salesman (and later manager and owner) at the NAPA franchised Maryland Motors in Rockville, Maryland, and Eleanor Wagner Leighton Cunningham (born October 6, 1923, in Rockville, Maryland; died August 12, 2019, in Maryland, US ), later a secretary in the Montgomery County Public Schools system, and the author of five books, including He Touched Her (Warner Press, 1973), and Miss Apple: Letters of a Maine Teacher in Kentucky (2003) about her mother, Ethel Valentine Applebee (born February 12, 1893, in Enfield, Maine; died November 15, 1973, in Maryland), who had taught for nine months from September 1920 at the Chandler Normal School in Lexington, Kentucky, for the American Missionary Association.

Cunningham is the elder brother of Christian romance novelist Janice Ethel Elder (born August 19, 1959), author of Manila Marriage App (Pelican Press, 2015), (inspired by her brother's life as a single missionary), and also customer service manager for Christian publisher, The Word Among Us; and Rev. Dr. Diane Kathleen LeClerc (born March 26, 1963), professor of historical theology at Northwest Nazarene University since 1998, Pastor of Congregational Care at Nampa College Church in Nampa, Idaho, former president of the Wesleyan Theological Society (2007–2008), and the author or editor of four books, including Singleness of Heart: Gender, Sin, and Holiness in Historical Perspective (Scarecrow Press, 2001) and Discovering Christian Holiness: The Heart of Wesleyan Theology (2010).

Soon after their wedding on May 9, 1953, Cunningham's parents moved into a newly constructed three-bedroom house at 715 Crabb Avenue, in the Maryvale section of Rockville, Maryland. The Cunningham family attended a local congregation of the Church of God (Anderson, Indiana) in Montrose, Rockville, Maryland, where Eleanor's family had attended from its incorporation in October 1929, and had taught Sunday School since 1939. In January 1964, Cunningham joined the Loyal Temperance League, a children's organization founded by the Woman's Christian Temperance Union, and pledged to abstain from alcohol. Soon after, Cunningham's family moved to Gaithersburg, Maryland, where, seeking a church that holiness, they began to attend the newly opened local Church of the Nazarene (then located in the former Methodist Episcopal Church at Brookes Avenue), that had been founded on January 5, 1964. In the summer of 1965 the Cunningham family attended the Church of the Nazarene's annual Washington-Philadelphia District Camp Meeting in North East, Maryland, and after reading children's books about pioneer Nazarenes H. Orton Wiley, R.T. Williams, and Reuben "Uncle Bud" Robinson, Cunningham was converted at the age of 10 during that camp meeting. On September 26, 1965, Cunningham was received into full church membership of the Gaithersburg Church of the Nazarene by Pastor Wallace H. Smith.

From 1966 to 1968 Cunningham attended Gaithersburg Junior High School. At the age of 16, While a student at Gaithersburg High School (1968–1972), where he had perfect attendance, Cunningham felt a call to Christian ministry. After graduation from Gaithersburg High School on June 12, 1972, Cunningham attended Eastern Nazarene College, where he was awarded "Most Quiet for the Freshman Class of 1973", and where he was the pianist accompanying the Crossmen Quartet (Don Arey, Dennis Cushing, Barry Compton, and Dale L. Binkley) on their tour of churches and on their 1972 LP "Sweeter Gets the Journey". In 1976 Cunningham received the Bachelor of Arts cum laude from ENC in religion and history. Cunningham subsequently studied at Nazarene Theological Seminary in Kansas City, Missouri, where he was the student assistant to Nazarene theologian Dr. J. Kenneth Grider. In 1979 Cunningham graduated from NTS with a Master of Divinity cum laude. Cunningham studied at Johns Hopkins University in his native Maryland, where he studied under Timothy L. Smith and received the Master of Arts degree in history in 1981, and a PhD in History in 1984 for his dissertation "The Christian Faith Personally Given: Divergent Trends in Twentieth-Century American Methodist Thought", which included chapters on Methodists Edwin Lewis (1881–1959); Social Gospel liberal Ernest Fremont Tittle (October 21, 1885 – August 3, 1949); conservative Harold Paul Sloan (1881–1961); and evangelical humanist Lynn Harold Hough (September 10, 1877 – July 14, 1971). While studying at Johns Hopkins, Cunningham was a research assistant in American Religious History (1981–1983).

== Career ==
=== Asia-Pacific Nazarene Theological Seminary (from 1983) ===
Upon the recommendation of APNTS founding president Donald Owens, on September 27, 1982, Cunningham was approved by the Board of General Superintendents of the Church of the Nazarene to be a foundation faculty member of the proposed Asia Pacific Nazarene Theological Seminary (APNTS) to be established in Kaytikling, Taytay, Rizal, the Philippines in 1983. Soon after the successful defense of his doctoral dissertation, Cunningham arrived in Manila on November 5, 1983, nine days before the first classes of APNTS. Cunningham has served APNTS consecutively as an associate professor (1983–1991), professor (1991–2004) and distinguished professor (since 2004). Administratively, Cunningham has been dean of students and chaplain (1983–1987), academic dean (June 1989 – 2009) officer-in-charge for sixteen months (2001–2003),

Despite not having a specific call to be a missionary, in February 1988 Cunningham was appointed to APNTS a career missionary in the Church of the Nazarene by its General Board. In an interview published in October 2011, Cunningham indicated:

"I came to APNTS on a four-year specialized assignment, not expecting to make this a career, and without a 'call' to missions. After being here two years, I felt that this is where God wanted me, and that this is where God was using me, so I applied for career missionary status. My sense now is that God's calling is to ministry, and the 'where' of it makes me a missionary, and the 'what' of it makes me a teacher – but it's still the general call to ministry that is most important."

Also in 1988 Cunningham was a research fellow at Yale Divinity School. With the permission of the People's Republic of China, Cunningham visited China with Rev. John W. Pattee (born 1906), a retired Nazarene missionary to China and the Philippines, from May 16 to June 5, 1989. For three days from May 29, 1989, Cunningham and Pattee visited the old Nazarene mission field in Hebei, that had been abandoned more than forty years earlier.

==== 5th President (2008–2013) ====
After the 2007 resignation of APNTS President Dr. Hitoshi "Paul" Fukue to return to pastoral ministry in Japan, on October 29, 2007, Cunningham was elected to a two-year term as interim president by the APNTS board of trustees. At that time Cunningham indicated:

"As a graduate school in the Wesleyan tradition, APNTS has a great mission to prepare men and women for Christlike leadership and excellence in ministries. We will endeavor to 1) energize students to fulfill the world mission of Jesus Christ, 2) build a creative team of professors and staff, 3) expand holiness graduate education through distance programs, and 4) reach out to the local community."

In June 2008 Cunningham was elected the 5th president of APNTS by the board of trustees and assumed office in July 2008. Board of trustees chairman Dr. Neville Bartle indicated:

The Board has been impressed with the leadership that Dr. Cunningham has given to the seminary as interim president. We were impressed by Dr. Cunningham's commitment to the seminary over the past 25 years. As a person who has studied the history of Christianity in Asia and especially of the Church of the Nazarene in Asia, we felt that he had the background knowledge of the region that will give us good direction and vision for the future.

During APNTS's 25th anniversary, Cunningham was installed as the fifth president of APNTS in a service in the Wooten Chapel on the campus of APNTS on November 20, 2008. Exploring and developing APNTS's motto of "Bridging Cultures for Christ", in his inaugural address "Building New Bridges", Cunningham called for APNTS to build bridges to congregations within the Church of the Nazarene, to other denominations, to the community, and to the contemporary generation. In outlining his philosophy and priorities as president, Cunningham asserted:

"Seminary education must not only convey knowledge, build competency, and shape character, but direct attention to our immediate context of ministry. ... We must think outside the walls and reach beyond whatever seals off the church, by bridging the walls that separate us from the people among whom we live."

Consistent with that philosophy, Cunningham was responsible for advocating the creation of the Holistic Child Development (HCD) program at APNTS, the opening of extension centers in Fiji and Papua New Guinea, the construction of the New Life Mission Center and the establishment of the Bresee Institute East on the campus of APNTS.

In his annual presidential report in April 2011, Cunningham reaffirmed his desire to see students "demonstrate an aggressive kind of love for the people who are in their midst."

In March 2013 Cunningham announced his decision not to seek re-election as president of APNTS when his term concluded on April 3, 2013. At that time Cunningham indicated "his desire to remain at APNTS, serving as a historian, writer, and teacher." After the election of Dr. Seung-An "Abraham" Im as his successor, Cunningham agreed to remain at APNTS as interim president until the installation of Im.

===== Holistic Child Development (2008) =====
After attending the Global Consultation on Academic Programs in Holistic Child Development organized by Compassion International and Fuller Theological Seminary in Chiang Mai, Thailand on May 13–17, 2007, Cunningham was inspired to initiate a Holistic Child Development (HCD) program at APNTS. As the pioneer director, Cunningham was instrumental in APNTS inaugurating the HCD program in partnership with both Compassion International and Nazarene Compassionate Ministries in April 2008. Since its inception in November 2009, Cunningham has been the program director of the Ph.D. in HCD offered by the Asia Graduate School of Theology (AGST) Philippines hosted by APNTS. By 2010 APNTS had become "a world leader in the area of holistic child development." After the Philippines Commission of Higher Education (CHED) approved, APNTS began offering its own PhD in HCD in the 2011–2012 academic year, while continuing to co-operate with the AGST program. In an October 2011 interview, Cunningham indicated:

"APNTS is a child-focused school. Not only do we have academic programs (graduate certificate and diploma, MA, and PhD in holistic child development), but on any given day you will see children playing around campus – children of students, staff, and faculty, from various countries."

===== Extension centers (2010) =====
During the 2010–2011 academic year APNTS opened extension centers in Fiji and Papua New Guinea.

In July 2010 Cunningham announced the largest endowment gift in the history of APNTS, a gift of US$300,000 from the Crawford Family Foundation of Cecil and Mary Crawford to establish an endowment fund that will generate in perpetuity scholarships for needy students, and especially for women called to ministry.

===== New Life Mission Center (2011) =====
On June 17, 2011, Cunningham and pastors of the SangAmDong Church of the Nazarene and Onnuri Methodist Church, both in the Republic of Korea, dedicated the three-floor New Life Mission Center on the campus of Asia-Pacific Nazarene Theological Seminary, a few weeks before its completion. The center features hotel-like accommodations with full amenities and services, dormitory accommodations, and two apartments for visiting faculty members, complete with a kitchen and both indoor and outdoor dining spaces. While the initial purpose of the center was to provide housing for Work and Witness teams and missionaries coming to APNTS and the Philippines, this facility also provides housing for other groups coming to APNTS for short-term courses, seminars, workshops in missions, English, and the HCD program.

===== Bresee Institute East (2012) =====
After extensive discussions in late 2011 with Dr. Fletcher L. Tink, executive director of the Bresee Institute for Metro-Ministries at Nazarene Theological Seminary, who had taught classes in urban ministry at APNTS as an adjunct professor, on March 29, 2012, Cunningham signed an agreement with Tink to locate Bresee Institute's third campus (Bresee Institute East) in two offices on the fourth floor of the Nielson Center for Education and Evangelism Building at APNTS. The Bresee Institute East was established to become a major center and broker for consultation, seminars, and materials related to its mission to provide urban training, to expand its curriculum in urban and compassionate ministries, and to develop urban internships. It has been tasked to provide teaching and administrative support for a proposed accredited PhD program in urban and compassion ministries to be offered by APNTS.

=== Other ministries ===
==== Pastoral ministry ====
In addition to his work at APNTS, Cunningham pastored Nazarene churches in the Philippines for almost six years, including helping to plant a church in Teresa, Rizal for two years from December 1985. On April 6, 1988, Cunningham was ordained as an elder by the Mid-Atlantic District of the Church of the Nazarene. Cunningham subsequently pastored Nazarene churches at Diliman, Quezon City from February 1989 to March 1991; Central Church, Cubao, Quezon City from April 1991 to March 1992; and temporarily supplied (filled) the pulpit at the First Church of the Nazarene in Antipolo, Rizal for four months from November 1992.

==== Teaching ministry ====
In addition to teaching at APNTS since its founding in November 1983, Cunningham was an instructor at Montgomery College in Rockville, Maryland before being assigned to APNTS, where he taught introductory classes in Philosophy and Cultural anthropology; has taught at Korean Nazarene Theological College in Seoul, South Korea in the summer of 1986, was Missionary-in-Residence and taught at Northwest Nazarene College from January to June 1988, taught at Taiwan Nazarene Theological College in Beitou and the Wesleyan Institute of Pastoral Theology in Taipei, Taiwan, was Missionary-Scholar-in-Residence and taught at Nazarene Theological Seminary during the 1993–1994 academic year, taught at Southeast Asia Nazarene Bible College Extension Center in Yangon, Myanmar in 2008 and 2011; and taught the Doctrine of Holiness class at Melanesia Nazarene Bible College in the highlands of Papua New Guinea in November 2011.

Additionally, Cunningham is Senior Lecturer in Church History and a sessional lecturer at Nazarene Theological College in Thornlands, Queensland, Australia.

=== Asia-Pacific Regional Education Coordinator (2002–2008) ===
On February 1, 2002, Asia-Pacific Regional Director Dr. A. Brent Cobb appointed Cunningham as the Regional Education Coordinator (REC) for the Asia-Pacific Region of the Church of the Nazarene, with the responsibility of "facilitating the educational endeavor of the Church of the Nazarene" in the Asia-Pacific region. Cunningham remained in this role until 2008.

In his role as REC for the Asia-Pacific Region, Cunningham spoke at the graduation service of Melanesia Nazarene Bible College, Western Highlands Province, Papua New Guinea in November 2002, and visited Nazarene Theological College (Australia) in late 2002. Cunningham also organized the Asia-Pacific Regional Education Conference for 50 Nazarene educators and facilitators from 8 Nazarene educational institutions from the region in Bangkok, Thailand January 9–13, 2003. During the conference, plans were initiated to develop an extensive theological education system that would include many extension centers, methods, techniques, and tools. After the Education Conference, Cunningham indicated:

"Despite all the challenges of our vast region, our goal is to provide relevant, contextualized education for every pastor and ministry worker on our region through a cooperative network of related schools."

As REC Cunningham also presented a paper, "Holiness Embodied in the Asia-Pacific Context" at the Asia-Pacific Regional Conference of the Church of the Nazarene in Bangkok, Thailand on October 25, 2003; spoke at the graduation of Southeast Asia Nazarene Bible College's extension center in Yangon, Myanmar in March 2004, and presented a paper at the meeting of the International Course of Study Committee (ICOSAC) meetings in Perth, Western Australia in October 2005.

== Author ==
Cunningham is the author of two books, two study modules, dozens of scholarly articles and magazine articles, and the co-author of another book and a discipleship program.

Cunningham is a co-author (with Al Truesdale, Hal Cauthron, Linda Alexander, and Wes Eby) of Following Jesus Discipleship Program for JESUS Film Harvest Partners, a discipleship program for Jesus Film converts published in 2001.

Cunningham is the author of Holiness Abroad: Nazarene Missions in Asia (Scarecrow Press, 2003), which won the Smith-Wynkoop Award from the Wesleyan Theological Society in March 2004. Church of the Nazarene archivist Dr. Stanley Ingersol, who described Cunningham's book as "astute, evenhanded, and accurate", also wrote in 2003:

Cunningham's book is a narrative history of Nazarene missions in Asia that carries an honest assessment of the dynamics in cross-cultural missions that have shaped a unique modern denomination. The basic tone is conveyed in the foreword, where Cunningham writes that anything less than a frank understanding of the personality conflicts between missionaries and the cross-cultural conflicts between missionaries and national workers would be dishonest. The result is a book that shows how national pastors and leaders worked with Western missionaries to fashion an international denomination that has significant presence in the Asia-Pacific region. The book has specific chapters on Japan, China, India, Korea, and The Philippines.

In 2003 and 2004 Cunningham wrote the two church history modules for the Nazarene Ministerial Course of Study entitled Examining Our Christian Heritage.

Cunningham edited and co-wrote with fellow Nazarene historians Stan Ingersol, Harold E. Raser, and David P. Whitelaw, Our Watchword & Song: The Centennial History of the Church of the Nazarene, the official denominational history published by Nazarene Publishing House in 2009.

Cunningham is currently writing a history of Philippine Protestantism.

In 2018 Cunningham wrote Expressing a Nazarene Identity, the 5th volume in the Frameworks for Lay Leadership series published by Global Nazarene Publications.

== Professional memberships and ecumenical activities ==
Cunningham is a Life member of the Philippine National Historical Society, a member of the American Society of Church History, the Wesleyan Theological Society, and the American Historical Association since 1980.

=== AGST ===
Cunningham is on the Theological Studies & Church History program committee of the Asia Graduate School of Theology (AGST) Philippines (a consortium of evangelical seminaries in the Philippines), a member of the AGST faculty, and as APNTS president, a member of the AGST Philippines board since late 2008; Cunningham was the pioneer director of AGST's Church History Th.M./PhD program, which was hosted on the campus of APNTS, from its inception in Semester 1, 2002.

=== ATA ===
Additionally, Cunningham is a member of the Visitation Evaluation Team (VET) of the Asia Theological Association (ATA), who was involved in evaluating Asian Seminary of Christian Ministries (ASCM) in Makati, Metro Manila, in early 2010; and the Asian Theological Seminary in Quezon City, Philippines in September 2011. Since October 2007 Cunningham has served as the Philippines representative on the editorial board of ATA's Journal of Asian Evangelical Theology.

=== Other ===
Cunningham is a Research Fellow of the Australasian Centre for Wesleyan Research (ACWR), and also serves on the editorial board of its theological journal, Aldersgate Papers. From October 16–18, 2011 Cunningham was the speaker in a series of Holiness Conferences in Japan sponsored by the Japan Holiness Association.

== Awards and honors ==
On APNTS's Heritage Day on November 28, 2000, APNTS President Dr. John M. Nielson announced that the APNTS board of trustees had approved Cunningham as the first recipient of the APNTS Bridge Builder Award, "an elite award ... given occasionally in the history of APNTS in honor of long years of service and significant contributions to the mission of the seminary." Referring to Cunningham, Nielson indicated:

"He is the repository of our history, of precedent, and of the rationale behind carefully developed policy. He has been our primary liaison with the agencies of the Philippine Government, with accrediting agencies, and has played a significant role in our search for needed faculty. Dr. Cunningham takes on the tedious task of arranging class and teaching schedules so that the needs of students and of faculty are woven into a manageable whole. He is being relied on increasingly as a resource person by the General Church. He has been my strong right arm throughout my years here at APNTS. ... Dr. Cunningham has devoted his entire professional life to Asia-Pacific Nazarene Theological Seminary making invaluable contributions to the lives of generations of students and leaving an indelible mark upon the identity of the institution. His shadow is long. His service has been exemplary. His faithfulness has been enduring. His commitment has been firm."

At the 39th annual meeting of the Wesleyan Theological Society held in Rochester, New York, from March 4–6, 2004, Cunningham was announced as the recipient of the Smith-Wynkoop Award in absentia for his first book, Holiness Abroad: Nazarene Missions in Asia (Scarecrow Press, 2003). The Award, which was accepted on Cunningham's behalf by Stan Ingersol, is named in honor of the outstanding scholarly contributions of deceased Nazarene historian Timothy L. Smith, who was Cunningham's doctoral supervisor, and Nazarene theologian Mildred Bangs Wynkoop, who was theologian-in-residence when Cunningham was a student at Nazarene Theological Seminary in Kansas City, Missouri, from 1976 to 1979.

During its annual meeting in March 2004, the APNTS board of trustees decided to designate Dr Cunningham, who had served as dean of students and was at that time academic dean, the Distinguished Professor of the History of Christianity; and also decided "That the Floyd T. Cunningham APNTS Award of Academic Excellence ... be inaugurated immediately, and that it be awarded automatically to those who graduate from any of the post-graduate degree programs of APNTS with a grade point average qualifying the student for summa cum laude or magna cum laude honors, and that it be made retrospective to the commencement of APNTS; and that it be retroactive to those who have graduated with honors."

In early 2009 at a Generation Congregation (GenCon) service at the Taytay First Church of the Nazarene, Cunningham received the GenCon Honorary Award for "his committed attendance at GenCon, and his ability to 'Bridge' that cultural gap, if only with his presence."

At the annual Homecoming Dinner of his alma mater Eastern Nazarene College in October 2011, thirty-five years after his graduation, Cunningham was announced as the Alumnus of the Year, which he accepted in Manila via Skype technology.

== Works ==
=== Theses and dissertations ===
- "The Christian Faith Personally Given: Divergent Trends in Twentieth-Century American Methodist Thought". Ph.D. dissertation, Johns Hopkins University, 1983. Ann Arbor, MI: University Microfilms International, 1984.

=== Books ===
- Examining Our Christian Heritage 1. Kansas City, MO: Clergy Services, Church of the Nazarene, 2003. Published on CD-rom.
- Examining Our Christian Heritage 2. Kansas City, MO: Clergy Services, Church of the Nazarene, 2004. Published on CD-rom.
- Expressing a Nazarene Identity: Frameworks for Lay Leadership. Global Nazarene Publications, 2018.
- Holiness Abroad: Nazarene Missions in Asia. Pietist and Wesleyan Studies, No. 16. Lanham, MD: Scarecrow Press, 2003.
- ________, ed. Our Watchword & Song: The Centennial History of the Church of the Nazarene. By Floyd T. Cunningham; Stan Ingersol; Harold E. Raser; and David P. Whitelaw. Kansas City, MO: Beacon Hill Press of Kansas City, 2009.
- _____; Al Truesdale; Hal Cauthron; Linda Alexander; and Wes Eby, "Following Jesus Discipleship Program for JESUS Film Harvest Partners". JESUS Film Harvest Partners, 2001.
