= Nazarene Theological College, Manchester =

College in Manchester, England

Nazarene Theological College
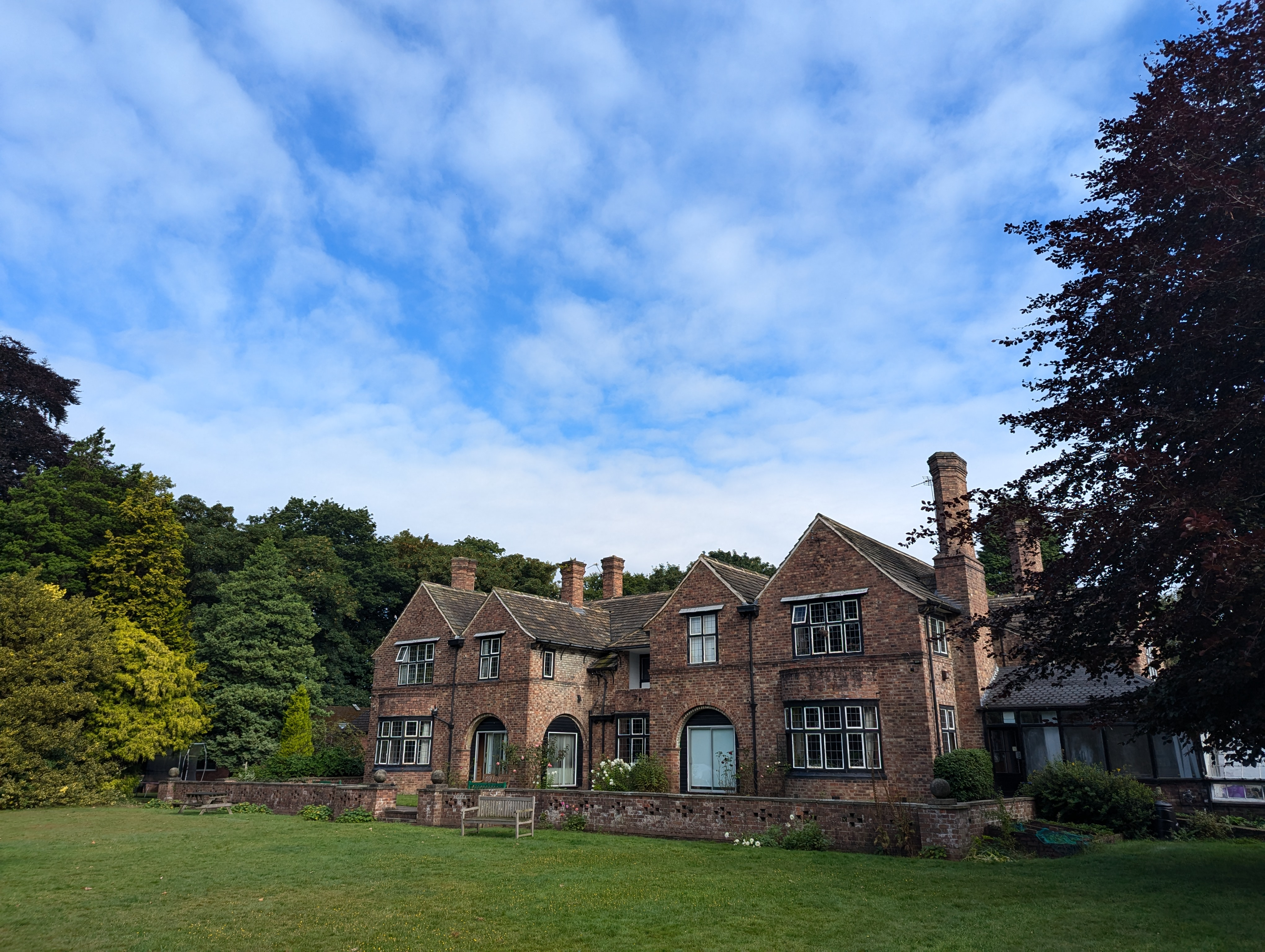
- Nazarene Theological College, Didsbury
- Other name: NTC
- Former name: British Isles Nazarene College
- Established: 1944
- Religious affiliation: Church of the Nazarene
- Academic affiliations: University of Manchester
- Principal: Deirdre Brower
- Location: Manchester, England
- Website: https://nazarene.ac.uk/

Listed Building – Grade II
- Official name: Nazarene Theological College
- Designated: 20 June 1988
- Reference no.: 1217813

The Nazarene Theological College (NTC), located in Didsbury, south Manchester, is an affiliated college of the University of Manchester. It offers theological degrees in various specialised disciplines across BA, MA, and PhD. NTC has its roots in the Church of the Nazarene and belongs to the World Methodist Council.

== Courses ==
NTC offers a BA (Hons) in Theology, a BA (Hons) in Theology (Biblical Studies), a BA (Hons) in Theology (Practical Theology), and a BA (Hons) in Theology (Counselling). It also offers a Certificate in Theology (a one year course) and a Diploma in Theology (a two year course). NTC offers 6 MA degrees, including an MA in Biblical Studies, Theological and Historical Studies, and Practical Theology and Leadership. A Doctor of Philosophy (PhD) is offered, with specialisms including: Biblical Studies, Wesleyan Theology, Missions, Church History, Wesley Studies, Christian Theology, Old Testament Studies/Second Temple/Inter-Testamental Studies, New Testament Studies and Biblical Theology, Practical Theology, Islam and Christian engagement and Missiology.

== Manchester Wesley Research Centre ==
NTC is home to the Manchester Wesley Research Centre (MWRC) which collaborates with Oxford Brookes University in publishing the Wesley and Methodist Studies journal, published biannually by Penn State University Press.

The MWRC is a working partnership between a range of institutions:

- Nazarene Theological College
- The University of Manchester John Rylands Library
- The University of Manchester Religions and Theology Subject Area
- The International Board of Education of the Church of the Nazarene
- Nazarene Theological Seminary
- Cliff College
- Point Loma Nazarene University
- Asbury Theological Seminary
- Asbury University
- Pentecostal Theological Seminary
- Wesley Seminary at Indiana Wesleyan University
- and Northwest Nazarene University.

== Didsbury Lectures ==
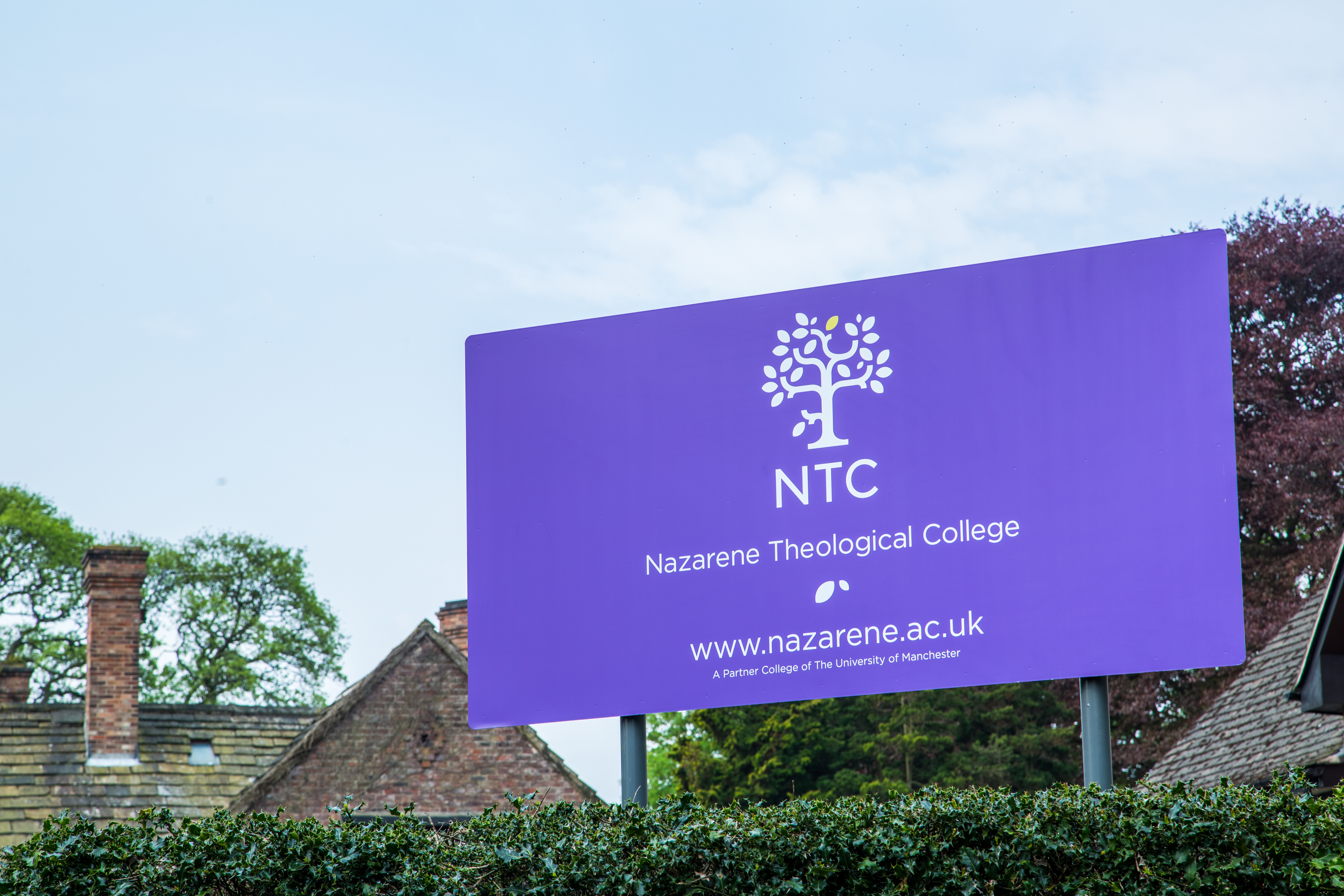
Outside the main entrance

For over 40 years NTC has hosted the Didsbury Lectures, which was inaugurated by F. F. Bruce in 1979. These lectures last four nights, and usually occur in the final few weeks of October.

=== Lecturers of the 1980s ===
- 1980 Revd Professor I Howard Marshall
- 1981 Revd Professor James Atkinson
- 1982 Revd Professor T F Torrance
- 1983 Revd Professor C K Barrett
- 1984 Revd Dr A R G Deasley
- 1985 Dr Donald P Guthrie
- 1986 Professor A F Walls
- 1987 Revd Dr A. Skevington Wood
- 1988 Professor Morna D Hooker
- 1989 Revd Professor Ronald E Clements

=== Lecturers of the 1990s ===
- 1990 Revd Professor Colin E Gunton
- 1991 Revd Professor J D G Dunn
- 1992 Revd Dr PM Bassett
- 1993 Professor David J A Clines
- 1994 Revd Professor James B Torrance
- 1995 Revd Dr R T France
- 1996 Professor Richard Bauckham
- 1997 Professor H G M Williamson
- 1998 Professor David Bebbington
- 1999 Professor L W Hurtado

=== Lecturers of the 2000s ===
- 2000 Professor Clark Pinnock
- 2001 Professor Robert P Gordon
- 2002 Revd Dr Herbert McGonigle
- 2003 Professor David Wright
- 2004 Revd Dr Stephen S Smalley
- 2005 Revd Dr N T Wright
- 2006 Professor Alan P F Sell
- 2007 Dr Elaine Storkey
- 2008 Dr Kent E Brower
- 2009 Professor Alan Torrance

=== Lecturers of the 2010s ===
- 2010 Professor George J. Brooke
- 2011 Professor Nigel Biggar
- 2012 Dr Thomas A Noble
- 2013 Professor Gordon Wenham
- 2014 Professor Frances Young
- 2015 Professor Elaine Graham
- 2016 Professor Michael J. Gorman
- 2017 Professor Philip Alexander and Canon Professor Loveday Alexander
- 2018 Professor Markus N. A. Bockmuehl
- 2019 Professor Michael Lodahl

=== Lecturers of the 2020s ===
- 2020 Professor John Swinton
- 2021 Professor John M. G. Barclay
- 2022 Revd Professor David Wilkinson
- 2023 Professor Amos Yong
- 2024 Professor John Behr
- 2025 Dr Stephen C. Barton

=== Upcoming Lecturers ===
- 2027 Dr Helen Cameron
- 2028 Professor D. Bruce Hindmarsh

== See also ==
- Nazarene International Education Association
- List of Church of the Nazarene schools
