= John M. Nielson =

3rd President President of Asia-Pacific Nazarene Theological Seminary
- In office November 1, 1989 – July 1, 2001
- Preceded by: E. LeBron Fairbanks
- Succeeded by: Hitoshi "Paul" Fukue

Personal details
- Born: John Mann Nielson; June 30, 1943 (age 83) Waterville, Vermont, U.S.
- Died: April 28, 2023 (aged 79)
- Spouse: Janice Marie Williams Nielson
- Children: John W. Nielson; Janelle Beiler
- Education: Eastern Nazarene College; Nazarene Theological Seminary
- Profession: Educator; Minister; Administrator

John M. Nielson (born June 30, 1943, in Waterville, Vermont) was a retired American ordained minister in the Church of the Nazarene, who served as the third president of Asia-Pacific Nazarene Theological Seminary in Manila, the Philippines from 1989 until 2001, as well as 15 years in pastoral ministry in the US, Germany, and Denmark. As an educator, Nielson has taught in Nazarene universities, colleges and seminaries in the US, the Philippines, Australia, and Samoa, including serving as associate professor of religion at Mount Vernon Nazarene University for 11 years. Previously, Nielson served as a global missionary for the Church of the Nazarene for 17 years. Nielson has written 3 books, a children's musical, and a had several poems and songs published.

== Early life and education ==
John Mann Nielson (born June 30, 1943, in Waterville, Vermont) was the oldest of the four children of Rev. John Bechtold Nielson (born February 26, 1918, in Darby, Pennsylvania; died June 29, 1997, in Waterville, Vermont), an ordained minister in the Church of the Nazarene, and his wife Marguerite Helene Mann Nielson (born May 11, 1916, in Waterville, Vermont; died February 16, 2009, in Salisbury, Maryland), later an elementary school teacher, who were married on June 25, 1942. Their other children are Rev. Dr. Merritt Joseph Nielson (born June 25, 1945, in Cambridge, Vermont), an ordained minister in the Church of the Nazarene, and former pastor and missionary, who has been Director of Curriculum at Nazarene Publishing House since February 2003; Mrs. Patricia Lynn Nielson "Patty" Parker (born July 23, 1948), wife of Rev. Ronald G. Parker, Lead Pastor of the Cross Pointe Church of the Nazarene in Salisbury, Maryland, since November 1991; and Rev. Dr. William "Bill" Brooks Nielson (born November 26, 1949, in the Roger W. Mann Hospital, Jeffersonville, Cambridge, Vermont), an ordained minister in the Church of the Nazarene, and Lead Pastor of the Heights First Church of the Nazarene in Albuquerque, New Mexico, since 1997.

Soon after the first anniversary of their wedding and the birth of their oldest child, John M. Nielson, in June 1943 John B. Nielson resigned the pastorate of the Church of the Nazarene in Johnson, Vermont, to become pastor of the Church of the Nazarene in Yarmouth, Maine. Subsequently, the Nielson family lived in Ottawa, Kansas; West Somerville, Massachusetts; and Pawtucket, Rhode Island, where John B. Nielson was the pastor of the local Church of the Nazarene.

After graduation from Shea High School in Pawtucket, Rhode Island, in May 1961, Nielson enrolled later that year in a Bachelor of Arts program at Eastern Nazarene College in Quincy, Massachusetts, choosing to major in religion.

== Career ==
=== Pastoral ministry (1965-1980) ===
After graduating from ENC in 1965, Nielson enrolled in ENC's Master of Arts program, majoring again in Religion. While still a student at Eastern Nazarene College, Nielson accepted a student pastorate at the Church of the Nazarene at Wells River, Vermont, that concluded in 1966.

From 1966 to 1967, Nielson was the pastor of the American Congregation of the Church of the Nazarene in Frankfurt, West Germany. while he was pastor of the American congregation in Frankfurt, he was also music director of the German congregation. They produced at least one recording of the choir under his leadership. In 1967 Nielson graduated again from ENC with a Master of Arts in Religion degree.

On June 30, 1967, Nielson married Janice Marie Williams, who had graduated with a Bachelor of Arts from ENC in May. They were married in Bethlehem, Pennsylvania.

While studying for a Bachelor of Divinity degree at Nazarene Theological Seminary, Nielson was a student pastor at the Church of the Nazarene at Carrollton, Missouri, from 1967 to 1969. After completing the B.D. cum laude in 1969, Nielson accepted the pastorate of the Church of the Nazarene in Warminster, Pennsylvania, later that year, and served until 1972. In 1972 Nielson began a three-year pastorate of the Immanuel Church of the Nazarene in Syracuse, New York.

=== Missionary to Denmark (1975-1980) ===
Nielson moved to Denmark in 1975, and was appointed pastor of the Church of the Nazarene in Rødovre, Denmark, that concluded in 1980. During that time he was also Literature Coordinator for the field and produced a Nazarene Hymnal in Danish as well as Sunday School and other literature.

=== Nazarene headquarters (1980-1981) ===
Nielson was Director of Ministerial Development at the international headquarters of the Church of the Nazarene (then located in Kansas City, Missouri) from 1980 to 1981. In that capacity, Nielson supervised the Course of Study to prepare ministers for licensing and ordination, as well as the continuing education program for ministers in the denomination. Nielson was responsible for organizing the Palcon II Conferences for Nazarene ministers in the US and Canada in this period, and for developing resources for Multiple Staff Org.

=== Higher Education ministry ===
==== Eastern Nazarene College (1982-1989 and 2001-2002) ====
In 1982 Nielson was appointed Vice President of Church and Public Relations for his alma mater, Eastern Nazarene College, and also served as the executive director of the ENC Alumni Association from 1982 to 1989.

From 2001, Nielson was Missionary-in-residence at Eastern Nazarene College for a year.

==== 3rd President, Asia-Pacific Nazarene Theological Seminary (1989-2001) ====
In November 1989, Nielson, then vice-president of Eastern Nazarene College, and formerly a missionary for the Church of the Nazarene to Denmark, was elected third President of APNTS. He and his wife Janice settled in Manila in February, 1990. Nielson resigned in July 2001, making him the longest-serving president of APNTS.

During Nielson's presidency, APNTS received initial accreditation by the Association for Theological Education in South East Asia (ATESEA) in 1991; endowments increased to over US$200,000; the Seminary's journal, The Mediator, commenced publication in 1996; and the board of trustees was re-organized to include ten elected members from within the Asia-Pacific region; and enrollment increased from 80 to 120. More than 70 percent of APNTS graduates were enrolled during Nielsons' tenure.

===== Regional Education Coordinator, Asia-Pacific Region (1991-1996) =====
During his presidency of APNTS, Nielson was also appointed Education Co-ordinator of the Asia-Pacific Region of the Church of the Nazarene, serving for five years from 1991. In that capacity, Nielson was a guest lecturer at some of the region's educational institutions, including Nazarene Theological College in Brisbane, Australia; and Samoa Nazarene Theological College, near Apia, Samoa.

==== European Nazarene College (2002-2004) ====
In 2002 Nielson accepted an invitation to serve as Academic Dean and Lecturer at European Nazarene College in Busingen, Germany, which was founded by his father John B. Nielson.

==== Mount Vernon Nazarene University (2004 to 2015) ====
In 2004, Nielson was appointed associate professor in religion at Mount Vernon Nazarene University in Mount Vernon, Ohio. He retired in May 2015.

== Awards and honors ==
In 1989 Nielson was awarded an honorary Doctor of Divinity degree his alma mater, Eastern Nazarene College. Previously ENC had awarded him an Alumni Achievement Award.

Nielson has received Preaching Awards from Eastern Nazarene College and Nazarene Theological Seminary.

In April 2003 Nielson was declared President Emeritus of Asia Pacific Nazarene Theological Seminary by action of the APNTS Board of Trustees.

On April 4, 2003, a special ceremony was held to dedicate the five-story multipurpose Nielson Center for Education and Evangelism located at the heart of APNTS's ten-acre campus. Housing classrooms, faculty offices, a chapel, the library, the Regional Communications Center, and the Philippine Field offices, the Nielson Center was named in honor of Nielson and his wife, Janice.

On August 25, 2015, Nielson received the Faculty of the Year award from Mount Vernon Nazarene University (MVNU).

== Personal life ==
On June 30, 1967, in Bethlehem, Pennsylvania, Nielson married Janice Marie Williams Nielson (born May 19, 1945, in Wilmington, Delaware), a graduate of Eastern Nazarene College (1967), the second daughter of Hazel Smallwood Williams (born May 16, 1915, in Maryland; died November 30, 2014), and Rev. Chester Milton Williams (born September 11, 1909, in Washington D.C.; died November 7, 2001, in New Holland, Pennsylvania), a graduate of George Washington University, and an ordained pastor in the Church of the Nazarene and an accomplished musician, who was later taught music at Eastern Nazarene College They have two children:

- Rev. Dr. John Williams "Jay" Nielson (born August 30, 1968), an ordained minister in the Church of the Nazarene, graduate of Eastern Nazarene College (B.A. in religion) (1985), and Nazarene Theological Seminary (Master of Divinity) (1993) and Doctor of Ministry (D Min) (2013), who has been the Chair of the Religion and Culture Program at Eastern Nazarene College since August 2018; Adjunct Assistant Professor, Pastoral Ministries at Nazarene Bible College, lecturing online since 2003; and was Lead Pastor of the Melwood Church of the Nazarene in Melwood, Maryland, from August 1994 to August 2018. Jay has been married to Amy since June 17, 1989, and they have three daughters.
- Rev. Janelle Marie Nielson Beiler (born August 18, 1971), an ordained minister in the Church of the Nazarene, graduate of Eastern Nazarene College with a bachelor's degree in Psychology/English (1993); Master of Science (M.S.) in Pastoral Counseling and Spiritual Care from Loyola University Maryland; and a Master of Arts in Religious Education from Nazarene Theological Seminary (1997); has been a Chaplain and Pastoral and Bereavement Counselor at Coastal Hospice in Salisbury, Maryland since June 2012 and a High School English Teacher at Salisbury Christian School since August 2012; and is the President of the Alumni Association of Eastern Nazarene College; and is formerly a Children's Pastor at the Cross Pointe Church of the Nazarene in Salisbury, Maryland, from 1997 to 2012, Janelle has been married to Rev. Joel Beiler since May 31, 1993, and they have two sons.

== Later years ==
After his retirement from teaching at Mount Vernon Nazarene University in May 2015, Nielson and his wife, Janice, continued to live in Mount Vernon, Ohio.

== Works ==
=== Books ===
- 1978. Dåb & frelse: et bibelsk studium [Baptism and Salvation: A Biblical Study]. Agape.
- 1980. With Merritt J. Nielson. Watering the Roots: Middle East * Europe * British Isles; 1980/81 Missionary Resource Book and Leader's Guide. Kansas City, MO: Nazarene.
- 1985. Beacon Small-Group Bible Studies, Romans: More Than Conquerors. Ed. Earl C. Wolf. Kansas City, MO: Beacon Hill.

=== Music ===
- Author and composer. Bible Walk. Children's Musical. Kansas City, MO: Nazarene.
- Composer. Various songs. Kansas City, MO: Lillenas, 1980.

== See also ==
- Presidency of John M. Nielson at APNTS
