= E. LeBron Fairbanks =

Dr. E. LeBron Fairbanks D.Min., M.Th., M.Div., M.A., A.B.
- Education Commissioner emeritus
- Church: Church of the Nazarene
- Predecessor: Dr. Jerry Lambert
- Successor: Dr. Daniel R. Copp
- Other posts: 3rd Education Commissioner, Church of the Nazarene; 5th President, MVNU; 2nd President, APNTS; Associate Professor, BNC; Academic Dean, ENBC

Orders
- Ordination: 1970, Tennessee

Personal details
- Born: July 27, 1942 (age 84) Chattanooga, Tennessee, US
- Denomination: Church of the Nazarene
- Parents: Edward T. Fairbanks; Bernice Woody Fairbanks
- Spouse: Edith Anne James Fairbanks
- Profession: educator, minister, missionary, administrator,
- Education: Trevecca Nazarene College; Scarritt College; NTS; PTS

E. LeBron Fairbanks (born July 27, 1942) is a leadership consultant, an adjunct professor at Asia-Pacific Nazarene Theological Seminary, and a retired American ordained minister in the Church of the Nazarene who is President emeritus of Mount Vernon Nazarene University, President emeritus of Asia-Pacific Nazarene Theological Seminary, and who served the Church of the Nazarene as the Education Commissioner from March 2008 to September 2011. Additionally, Fairbanks was an editor in the Church Schools Department of the Church of the Nazarene in Kansas City, Missouri; Academic Dean of European Nazarene Bible College in Busingen, Germany (1978–1982); Associate Professor of Christian Education and Lay Ministry Development, and Coordinator of the Master of Ministry program at Bethany Nazarene College (1982–1984); the 2nd President of Asia-Pacific Nazarene Theological Seminary (APNTS) in Taytay, Rizal, the Philippines from September 1984 to July 1989; and the 5th President of Mount Vernon Nazarene University (MVNU) in Mount Vernon, Ohio, for over 17 years from July 1989 until his retirement on January 31, 2007. Fairbanks founded and has served as the director of BoardServe LLC, "a consulting service for governing boards and their leaders", since 2011.

== Early life and education ==
Edward LeBron Fairbanks was born in Chattanooga, Tennessee, on July 27, 1942, the oldest of the four children of Edward T. Fairbanks (born February 27, 1918, in Chattanooga, Tennessee; died April 1977 in Pottstown, Pennsylvania), a woodworker at the Cavalier Furniture Company, and his wife, Ruby Bernice Woody Fairbanks (born August 30, 1916, in Alabama; died March 31, 1973, in Hialeah, Florida), a knitter in a hosiery mill. Fairbanks is the older brother of Charles Freeman Fairbanks; Carolyn Faye Fairbanks-Alford Lawson; and Dr. Larry Russell Fairbanks, who served as a pastor with the Church of the Nazarene for 28 years, and was District Superintendent of the Northwestern Ohio District, Church of the Nazarene (1998–2008).

=== Hialeah, FL (1956–1960) ===
From 1956 to 1960, Fairbanks attended Hialeah High School. To help supplement the family income and pay for his education, Fairbanks worked afternoons after school at the local A&P grocery store. As a teenager, Fairbanks and his mother and siblings attended the Church of the Nazarene at 310 East 5th Street in Hialeah. In the summer of 1959, Fairbanks attended a summer church camp meeting. During a Saturday morning service, he responded to an invitation from the pastor and prayed, surrounded by friends. For Fairbanks, "this was a defining and clarifying moment that had obvious implications for the rest of his life." In a 2007 interview Fairbanks commented:

"I remember going back to my high school and telling my best friend at the time that something significant had just happened to me and I would not be doing the things and going to the places we used to. I really wanted to be a Christian.

Fairbanks also now had the desire to attend college. A few months after his conversion in 1959, during his senior year of high school, Fairbanks was diagnosed with leukemia, and advised that he would not live. In December 2010 Fairbanks recalled:

Within months following a life transforming, grace initiated conversion to Christ, I was diagnosed with leukemia. My parents were told that I would not leave the hospital alive. My worst night in the hospital was when I received a long distance telephone call in my hospital room from a friend who wanted to talk to me before I 'died.' A healing and prayer was held in my room with family and friends from the local Nazarene Church. Within weeks, I left the hospital.

After four years of regular medical appointments, Fairbanks was advised there was no longer any traces of the disease. Fairbanks preached his first sermon in the Church of the Nazarene in Hialeah as one of the congregation's "preacher boys".

=== Trevecca Nazarene College (1960–1964) ===
In the fall of 1960, Fairbanks enrolled at Trevecca Nazarene College (TNC) in Nashville, Tennessee, the first person in his extended family of thirteen brothers and sisters of his mother and four siblings of his father to enroll in a college or university. In his first week at TNC, Fairbanks met his future wife, classmate Edith Anne James (born September 16, 1942, in Gainesville, Georgia). Soon after enrolling at TNC, Fairbanks "responded to what I perceived as a call of God to pastoral ministry." In 2009 Fairbanks recalled:

I remember repeating often to myself as a young theological student these words, "if I am going to be a pastor, then I want to be the best trained pastor I can be." ... It was during these years that a fascination with Wesleyan theology developed as I absorbed the teaching of Drs. William Greathouse, John Allan Knight (sic) and Bill Strickland.

During his sophomore year at TNC, Fairbanks had a significant spiritual experience. In 2004, he recalled:

Something very significant happened to me spiritually in my sophomore year. I remember the date - January 17, 1962. Revival services were being held on campus. In some way, God gripped my heart through the singing and preaching. I remember going to my room following the service. I made a little altar out of a milk carton box. That night I was sanctified through and through. I came to the point of saying to God, "If I am going to be a Christian, I want to be the best Christian I can. I don't want to play games. I don't want to go halfway. Here's my life. Translate my testimony of faith to integrity in life. I want my words spoken and deeds done to flow from what I believe and affirm." From the depth of my heart, that night, and by the grace of God, I spoke a "forever yes!" to God the Father, Son, and Holy Spirit.

Fairbanks and Anne James were married on June 22, 1962. Fairbanks graduated from TNC with a Bachelor of Arts degree in 1964.

== Career ==
Following graduation, Fairbanks became an associate pastor at Grace Church of the Nazarene in Nashville, Tennessee. Simultaneously, he enrolled in Scarritt College, a Methodist graduate school, to complete a Master of Arts in Christian Education, which he completed in 1967.

In 1967, Fairbanks became a member of the editorial staff of the Church of the Nazarene's Department of Church Schools located at the International Headquarters of the denomination in Kansas City, Missouri, where he worked closely with Dr. Albert F. Harper and Dr. Kenneth Rice. Concurrently, Fairbanks enrolled in the Master of Divinity program at Nazarene Theological Seminary, and was a teaching assistant to Dr. Chester "Chet" Galloway, the first professor of Christian Education at NTS. As part of that responsibility, Fairbanks taught his first class - Christian Education of Children. Fairbanks graduated with an M.Div. in 1970. On August 27, 1970, Fairbanks was ordained an elder in the Church of the Nazarene by the Tennessee District.

=== Pastor, Church of the Nazarene, Pennsylvania (1971–1978) ===
After becoming pastor of the Church of the Nazarene in Norristown, Pennsylvania, in 1971, Fairbanks enrolled at and graduated from Princeton Theological Seminary (PTS) with a Master of Theology, where he served as teaching assistant to Dr. D. Campbell Wyckoff, "the premier Christian education theorist in the United States during the ’60s to ’80s." Later in 1971, Fairbanks enrolled in inaugural Doctor of Ministry program at PTS.

In 1974, Fairbanks left the Norristown church to become associate pastor at the Immanuel Church of the Nazarene in Lansdale, Pennsylvania; however. in 1975 he left to become pastor of the Community Church of the Nazarene in West Grove, Pennsylvania, a position he held until 1978. From 1975 to 1978, Fairbanks was President of the Nazarene Young People's Society (from 1976 Nazarene Youth International) on the Philadelphia District Church of the Nazarene. In June 1976, Fairbanks was elected to a four-year term as a member of the General Council of Nazarene Youth International at the quadrennial General Convention held in Dallas, Texas. In 1978 he resigned each of these positions to accept the invitation to become Academic Dean of European Nazarene Bible College.

Despite completing the coursework in pastoral ministry and being named as a Fellow in Pastoral Leadership Education in 1976, Fairbanks eventually withdrew from the D.Min. program at PTS before submitting his thesis as he was increasingly engrossed in pastoral ministry.

After attending the Continental Congress on the Family, a national conference of 1800 evangelical Christians that met in St. Louis, Missouri, the week of October 13, 1975, and with the encouragement of Dr. James D. Hamilton, professor of pastoral care and counseling at NTS, Fairbanks enrolled in NTS’s first Doctor of Ministry class in 1976. More than thirty years later Fairbanks indicated: "It was one of the best decisions I’ve made in life." In 1978, Fairbanks graduated with the Doctor of Ministry degree from NTS after submitting a thesis, "Strengthening Family Communication in the Christian Home: A Family Enrichment Retreat."

=== Academic Dean, European Nazarene Bible College (1978–1982) ===
In 1978, Fairbanks became the Academic Dean of European Nazarene Bible College (ENBC) (now European Nazarene College) in Büsingen, Germany. By 1979 Fairbanks initiated and chaired a self-study committee. Under his leadership, ENBC expanded the curricular choices by including the Bachelor of Arts program offered in conjunction with MidAmerica Nazarene College. Additionally, Fairbanks worked to implement a special relationship with MANC both to share faculty and to allow selected ENBC students to graduate with baccalaureate degrees accredited through the U.S.’s North Central Association.

=== Professor, Bethany Nazarene College (1982–1984) ===
In 1982, Fairbanks became Associate Professor of Christian Education and Lay Ministry Development, and Coordinator of the Master of Ministry program at Bethany Nazarene College (now Southern Nazarene University)in Bethany, Oklahoma.

=== 2nd President, Asia-Pacific Nazarene Theological Seminary (1984–1989) ===
In April 1984, the Board of General Superintendents elected Fairbanks as the second President of Asia-Pacific Nazarene Theological Seminary (APNTS) in Kaytikling, Taytay, Rizal, Philippines, to succeed founding President Dr. Donald D. Owens, who also was Regional Director of the Asia Region of the Church of the Nazarene, who had resigned early in 1984 as he had felt that the demands of being both Regional Director of the Asia Region and President of APNTS were too much. Fairbanks visited APNTS for the first time in July 1984, and moved to Manila with Anne and their son, Stephen, in September 1984.

In March 2005, Fairbanks was installed as the first full-time APNTS President by General Superintendent Dr. William M. Greathouse. In addition to being President, Fairbanks taught in the areas of pastoral ministry and Christian education. He turned his attention to separating and transferring the financial records and administration of APNTS from the regional office to the Seminary, and to helping the faculty articulate a mission statement for the school.

Fairbanks resigned from APNTS in July 1989 and was succeeded as president by Dr. John M. Nielson, then a Vice-President of Eastern Nazarene College, and a former missionary to Denmark.

=== 5th President, Mount Vernon Nazarene College (1989–2007) ===
On July 27, 1989, the Board of Trustees of Mount Vernon Nazarene College (now Mount Vernon Nazarene University) elected Fairbanks as MVNC's fifth president, a position he held for over 17 years until his retirement on January 31, 2007, making him the longest-serving president of the institution.

In his final report to the MVNU Board of Trustees on November 2, 2006, Fairbanks summarised the notable achievements of his presidency: "Permit me to reflect for a few moments on the years since 1989 when I was elected MVNU’s fifth president. In my most recent article for “In Focus,” our internal communication newsletter, I shared with the faculty and staff some thoughts about change at MVNU. Some things have changed. For instance: Enrollment to 2,670 (+150%). Operating budget to $43 million (+300%). New and expanded academic programs for undergraduate and graduate students taught in traditional and non-traditional formats. University transition. Discipline-specific national accreditation. Midwest regional academic recognition. New academic and residence life facilities. Satellite campuses. Campus Ministries division. Cultural diversity initiatives. Property expansion from 279 to 405 acres. MVNU endowment expanded to $12.6 million (+400%). Cumulative Current (or emergency) Fund increased to $2.7 million (+153%). Debt burden ratio reduced to 2.1%. Foundation Board created to manage Endowment and University funds. Strategic plans and leadership agendas to guide the university through the decade."

From 1995 until his retirement in 2007, Fairbanks was also a professor at MVNU, teaching a one-week module "The Pastor as Leader: Leading a Christian Community of Faith" on four occasions.

In 1998, Fairbanks was credited by The New York Times as the originator of the 1994 idea for MVNC and five other Ohio colleges to save money by seeking ways to combine administrative tasks and other resources, resulting in a $4 million grant from the Teagle Foundation, a midsize private philanthropy, to establish the Collaborative Ventures Program.

==== Further Studies and other activities ====
While serving as President of MVNU, Fairbanks pursued post-doctoral studies at the Harvard Graduate School of Education's Institute of Educational Management in 1991, and was a Research Fellow at the Yale University Divinity School in New Haven, Connecticut, during 1999.

At the invitation of Bob Ney, chairman of the Subcommittee On Housing and Community Opportunity, in March 2003 Fairbanks testified before a United States congressional subcommittee in favor of the Bush administration's proposal that would make it easier for religious groups to receive federal social security funding, specifically arguing that MVNC wanted to build subsidized housing for low-income students but was prevented by legislation from applying for such aid even though public colleges were eligible.

=== Retirement (2007–2008) ===
After Fairbanks left MVNU, he spent a few months at their home in Lakeland, Florida, completing Learning to Be Last: Leadership for Congregational Transformation (Beacon Hill Press of Kansas City, 2008) that he co-wrote with Stan Toler. Additionally, Fairbanks chaired a Missional Review team assessing the Church of the Nazarene International Board of Education (IBOE) and the role of the Education Commissioner. In late March 2007 Fairbanks travelled to The Netherlands where he participated in meetings of the International Course of Study Advisory Committee (ICOSAC) and the IBOE. The Fairbankses returned to European Nazarene College (EuNC) for the fall 2007 semester and taught in EuNC's extension program throughout Europe.

In September 2007, the APNTS Board of Trustees elected Fairbanks as vice-president for Planning and Development, a non-resident administration position.

In January 2008, Fairbanks became an adjunct professor at APNTS, where he has taught "Organizational Leadership", "Legal, Ethical, and Political Issues in Leadership', and "Spiritual Formation" courses.

=== 3rd Education Commissioner of the Church of the Nazarene (2008–2011) ===
Despite having retired from Mount Vernon Nazarene University, Fairbanks accepted unanimous election as the denomination's 3rd Education Commissioner by the General Board of the Church of the Nazarene in February 2008. As the Education Commissioner, it was his responsibility work closely with the International Board of Education (IBOE) of the Church of the Nazarene, a 13-member board representing a consortium of 52 Nazarene colleges, universities, and seminaries Nazarene institutions with over 50,000 students on campuses and learning centers in 120 nations; the denomination’s regional education coordinators from the Asia-Pacific, Eurasia, South America, Mesoamerica, Africa, USA/Canada regions; and administrators and board leaders of the education institutions of the Church of the Nazarene. In October 2011 Fairbanks retired as the Education Commissioner for the Church of the Nazarene, and was succeeded by Dr. Daniel Copp.

=== BoardServe LLC (from 2011) ===
In 2011 Fairbanks founded BoardServe LLC, "a consulting resource for governing boards and their leaders", that provides "a consulting and coaching resource to board chairs, school and organization leaders, and to governing board members who desire to function in their board roles more effectively and efficiently, and consistent with the mission, vision and values of the organization."

In 2012 Fairbanks co-authored "Best Practices for Effective Boards" and also created a teaching video, "Building Better Boards: A Conversation", that is available in English, Spanish and Burmese. In October 2016 Fairbanks authored the book, "Leading Decisively! Leading Faithfully! Reflections and Markers", which has since been translated into six additional languages: Spanish, Korean, Portuguese, Italian, Burmese and Mandarin Chinese.

== Other activities ==
Fairbanks served on the International Course of Study Advisory Committee (ICOSAC) from 1977 to 2011; was a member of the Church of the Nazarene's Education Commission Steering Committee from 1985 to 1989; served from 1995 to 1998 as chair of a Church of the Nazarene Council of Education subcommittee developing a strategic plan for networking and collaboration; from 1998 to 1999 was a member of the writing team member, TEAM CIS (Confederation of Independent States) project; from 1998 to 2000 was a member of the writing team that created the Nazarene Education Manifesto; chaired the committee "Who Owns Ministerial Preparation?" (2001–2002); and served as secretary of the International Church Commission from (2001–2005).

While President of Mount Vernon Nazarene University, Fairbanks served on the executive committee of the Ohio Foundation of Independent Colleges; and was a member of the board of directors of the Council of Independent Colleges. was a member of the International Management Council, in Mount Vernon, Ohio; was a member of the Mount Vernon YMCA Board, the Community Foundation of Mount Vernon and Knox County, the Mount Vernon Rotary Club, and was an honorary chair of Knox Community Hospital’s capital campaign for a new medical pavilion.

== Later years ==
After his retirement as Education Commissioner, in October 2011, Fairbanks and his wife Anne moved to Lakeland, Florida.

In 2013 Fairbanks served as the interim principal of Nazarene Theological College in Thornlands, Queensland, Australia.

From 2014 to 2016, Fairbanks was a Senior Consultant at the National Development Institute in Columbia, South Carolina.

Fairbanks has also served as interim pastor of First Church of the Nazarene in Tampa, Florida, in 2014; Lake Gibson Church of the Nazarene in Lakeland, Florida in 2014; and the First Vietnamese Church of the Nazarene in Tampa, Florida in 2016.

== Personal ==
On June 22, 1962, Fairbanks married Edith Anne James (born on September 16, 1942, in Gainesville, Georgia). The Fairbankses have one son, Stephen LeBron Fairbanks, whom they adopted in 1975.

== Honors and awards ==
In 1991, Fairbanks was given the Ministerial "T" Award as the clergy Alumnus of the Year by his alma mater, Trevecca Nazarene University. In 1993 the Asia-Pacific region established a media center on campus of APNTS, that was named the "Fairbanks Media Center" in his honor in 1994 by the Board of Trustees of APNTS.

In 2004, APNTS named Fairbanks President Emeritus of APNTS. After his retirement as president of MVNU, Fairbanks was declared President Emeritus of Mount Vernon Nazarene University in 2007.

In 2011, Fairbanks was presented with a Certificado po Servicio Distinguido by Seminario Theologico Nazareno, Ciudad de Guatemala.

During the 89th Session of the General Board of the Church of the Nazarene that met in Overland Park, Kansas, in February 2012, Fairbanks' ministry in the Church of the Nazarene was recognized, and the following tribute was included:

Along the way his career and service to the Church of the Nazarene and higher education include a distinguishing characteristic of servant leadership with a strong emphasis on personal integrity.

In 2012, Fairbanks was recognized as a Certified Nonprofit Consultant in Board Development by the National Development Institute.

== Works ==
- "Writings": a collection of speeches, messages, miscellaneous addresses, and essays written by Dr. E. LeBron Fairbanks.

=== Theses ===
- "Strengthening Family Communication in the Christian Home: A Family Enrichment Retreat." D.Min. thesis, Nazarene Theological Seminary, 1978.

=== Books ===
- Acts: The Continuing Mission of the Church. Beacon Small-Group Bible Study Series. Ed. Earl C. Wolf. Kansas City, MO: Beacon Hill Press of Kansas City, 1985.
- For This We Stand: Values Underlying the Mount Vernon Nazarene University Faith Community. Mount Vernon, OH: Mount Vernon Nazarene University, 1994.
- Leading the People of God: Servant Leadership for a Servant Community: Leader Guide. Kansas City, MO: Clergy Services Development, Church of the Nazarene, 2003. Rev. ed., 2012. Lenexa, Kansas: Clergy Development Church of the Nazarene.
- Leading the People of God: Servant Leadership for a Servant Community: Student Guide. Kansas City, MO: Clergy Services Development, Church of the Nazarene, 2003. Rev. ed., 2012. Lenexa, Kansas: Clergy Development Church of the Nazarene.
- Leading Decisively! Leading Faithfully! Reflections and Markers. Lakewood, FL: Boardserve LLC, 2016.
- Philippians/Colossians: Experiencing His Peace. Beacon Small-Group Bible Studies. Kansas City, MO: Beacon Hill Press of Kansas City, 1982. ISBN 0834107783, 9780834107786
- ________ and Stan Toler. Learning to Be Last: Leadership for Congregational Transformation. Kansas City, MO: Beacon Hill Press of Kansas City, 2008. ISBN 0834123533, 9780834123533
- ________ , Dwight M. Gunter, II; and James R. Couchenour. Best Practices for Effective Boards. Kansas City, MO: Beacon Hill Press of Kansas City, 2012. ISBN 0834128349, 9780834128347

=== Articles ===
- "The Cooperative Edge: Institutional Collaboration as Institutional Strategy". In USA Group Foundation, New Agenda Series 2:2 (March 2000):40-45.
- "Servant Leadership for a Servant Community." Closing address for the 2nd Pan Asia Christian Education Seminar in Singapore, 1988.
