= List of Church of the Nazarene schools =

This is a list of Bible colleges, liberal arts colleges, and seminaries owned and operated by the Church of the Nazarene. They are listed by continent and country.

== Africa ==
=== Côte d'Ivoire ===
- Institut Biblique Nazareen, Abidjan

=== Kenya ===
- Africa Nazarene School of Extension, Nairobi
- Africa Nazarene University, Nairobi

=== Malawi ===
- Nazarene Theological College of Central Africa, Lilongwe

=== Mozambique ===
- Seminario Nazareno em Mozambique, Maputo

=== Nigeria ===
- Nigeria Nazarene Theological College, Abak, Akwa Ibom

=== South Africa ===
- Nazarene Theological College, Honeydew, Johannesburg, South Africa

=== Swaziland ===
- Southern Africa Nazarene University, a merger of the following institutions:
  - Swaziland Nazarene College of Education
  - Swaziland Nazarene College of Nursing
  - Swaziland Nazarene College of Theology, Siteki

== Asia ==
=== India ===
- Nazarene Nurses Training College, Maharashtra
- South Asia Nazarene Bible College, Bangalore

=== Indonesia ===
- Indonesia Nazarene Theological College, Yogyakarta

=== Japan ===
- Japan Christian Junior College, Chiba, Japan
- Japan Nazarene Theological Seminary, Tokyo

=== Philippines ===
- Asia-Pacific Nazarene Theological Seminary, Taytay, Rizal
- Community Nazarene Christian School, Inayawan, Cebu
- Philippine Nazarene College, (formerly Luzon Nazarene Bible College), Pico, La Trinidad, Benguet
- Visayan Nazarene Bible College, Cebu City, Cebu

=== South Korea ===
- Korea Nazarene University, Cheonan

=== Taiwan ===
- Taiwan Nazarene Theological College, Beitou, Taipei (inactive)

=== Thailand ===
- Southeast Asia Nazarene Bible College, Bangkok

== Australia and Oceania ==
=== Australia ===
- Nazarene Theological College, Thornlands, Queensland

=== Fiji, Micronesia, Samoa, Solomon Islands, Vanuatu ===
- South Pacific Nazarene Theological College, registered in Apia

=== Papua New Guinea ===
- Melanesia Nazarene Bible College, Ningei, Mount Hagen, Western Highlands Province, Papua New Guinea
- Nazarene College of Nursing, Kudjip, Western Highlands Province
- Nazarene Teachers' College, Ningei, Western Highlands Province

== Europe ==
=== Germany ===
- European Nazarene College

=== United Kingdom ===
- Nazarene Theological College, Manchester, England

== North America ==
=== Canada ===
- Ambrose University College, Calgary, Alberta
- Institut Biblique Nazaréen du Québec, Québec, Canada

=== Costa Rica ===
- Seminario Nazareno de las Americas, San José

=== Cuba ===
- Instituto Biblico Nazareno, Havana

=== Dominican Republic ===
- Seminario Nazareno Dominicano, Santo Domingo

=== Guatemala ===
- Instituto Biblico Nazareno, Cobán, Alta Verapaz
- Seminario Teológico Nazareno de Guatemala, Guatemala City

=== Haiti ===
- Séminaire Théologique Nazaréen d'Haïti, Pétion-Ville

=== Mexico ===
- Seminario Nazareno Mexicano, A.C., Tecate, Baja California, Mexico

=== Trinidad and Tobago ===
- Caribbean Nazarene Theological College, Santa Cruz

=== United States ===
The seven liberal arts colleges have divided the country into "educational regions" and have formed a gentlemen's agreement to not actively recruit outside their educational region:

- MidAmerica Nazarene University in Olathe, Kansas (North Central)
- Mount Vernon Nazarene University in Mount Vernon, Ohio (East Central)
- Northwest Nazarene University in Nampa, Idaho (Northwest)
- Olivet Nazarene University in Bourbonnais, Illinois (Central)
- Point Loma Nazarene University in San Diego, California (Southwest)
- Southern Nazarene University in Bethany, Oklahoma (South Central)
- Trevecca Nazarene University in Nashville, Tennessee (Southeast)

There are, in addition to the liberal arts colleges, a Bible college and a seminary:

- Nazarene Bible College in Colorado Springs, Colorado
- Nazarene Theological Seminary in Kansas City, Missouri

== South America ==
=== Argentina ===
- Seminario Nazareno Sudamericano, Buenos Aires

=== Bolivia ===
- Seminario Teologico Nazareno de Bolivia, La Paz

=== Brazil ===
- Faculdade Nazarena do Brasil, Campinas

=== Chile ===
- Seminario Biblico Nazareno, Santiago

=== Ecuador ===
- Seminario Teologico Nazareno Sudamericano, Quito

=== Peru ===
- Instituto Biblico Nazareno, Bagua Chica
- Seminario Teologico Nazareno, Chiclayo

== See also ==
- Church of the Nazarene
- Nazarene International Education Association
