= MNBC =

MNBC may refer to:

- Melanesia Nazarene Bible College, a ministerial training college in Papua New Guinea
- Métis Nation British Columbia, an organization representing the Métis people
- Maldives National Broadcasting Corporation, the former name of Television Maldives
