= NIEA =

NIEA may refer to:

- National Indian Education Association
- Nazarene International Education Association
- NieA_7 anime title and character
- Northern Ireland Environment Agency
- National Indie Excellence Awards
