= Gaithersburg High School =

Location
- 101 Education Boulevard; Gaithersburg, Maryland 20878; United States; 39°08′07.72″N 77°11′40.90″W

Information
- Type: Public
- Motto: "Excellence Is The Standard"
- Established: 1904
- School district: Montgomery County Public Schools
- Principal: Brittany Love-Campbell
- Grades: 9–12
- Enrollment: 2,436
- Classes offered: Navy Junior Reserve Officers' Training Corps, Cosmetology, Hospitality and Tourism, Project Lead The Way Biomedical Science, Academy of Finance (AoF), Academy of Information Technology (AoIT)
- Campus: Suburban
- Colors: Blue and gold
- Mascot: Trojans
- Rival: Clarksburg High School; Colonel Zadok A. Magruder High School; Quince Orchard High School; Watkins Mill High School
- Newspaper: The Blue & Gold
- Yearbook: Sail On
- Feeder schools: Forest Oak Middle School and Gaithersburg Middle School
- Website: Gaithersburg High School
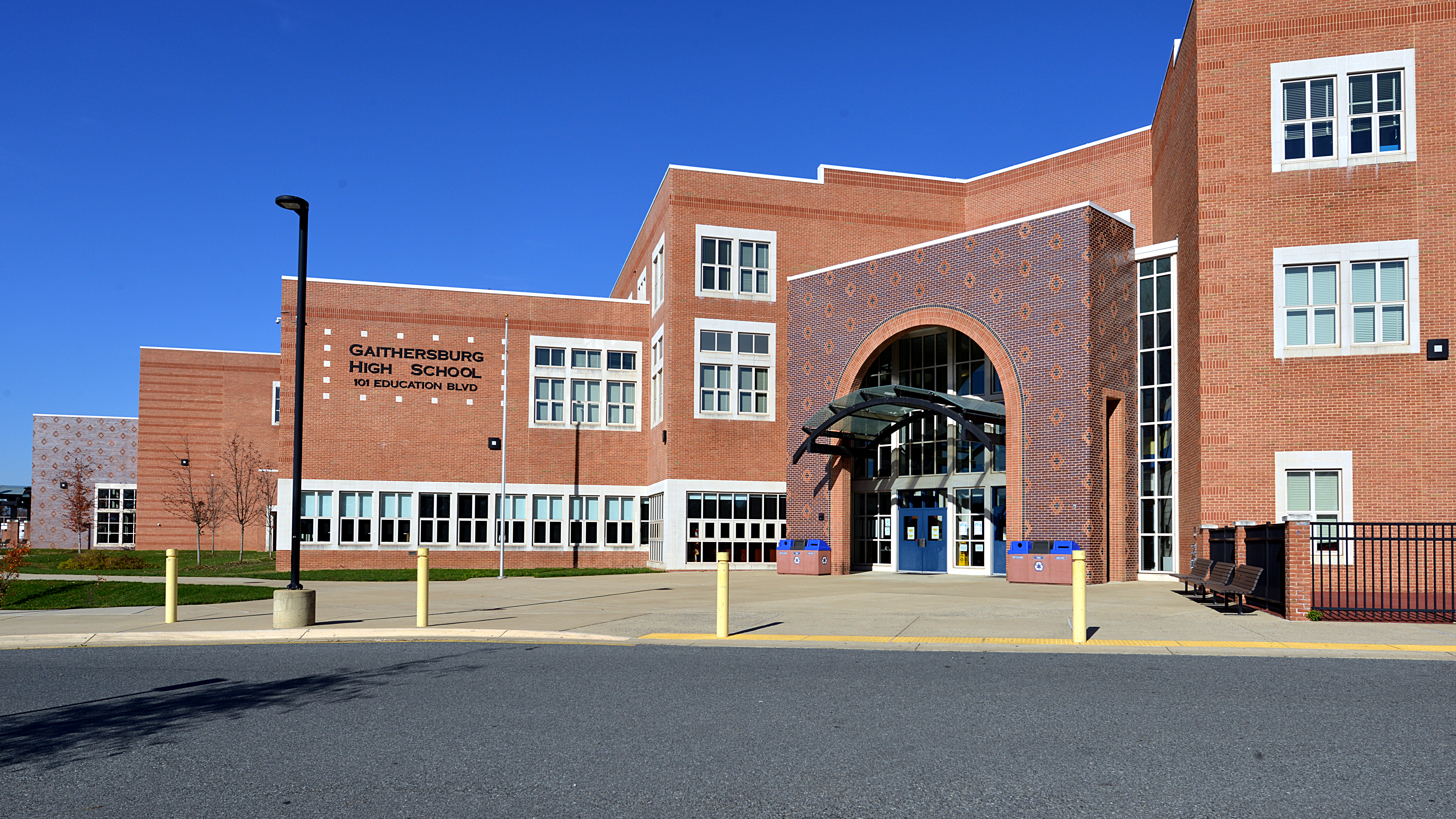

Gaithersburg High School (GHS) is a public high school in Gaithersburg, Maryland, United States. Part of Montgomery County Public Schools, the school is located at 101 Education Boulevard and consists of grades 9–12. Its feeder schools are Forest Oak Middle School and Gaithersburg Middle School.

== History ==
=== 20th century ===
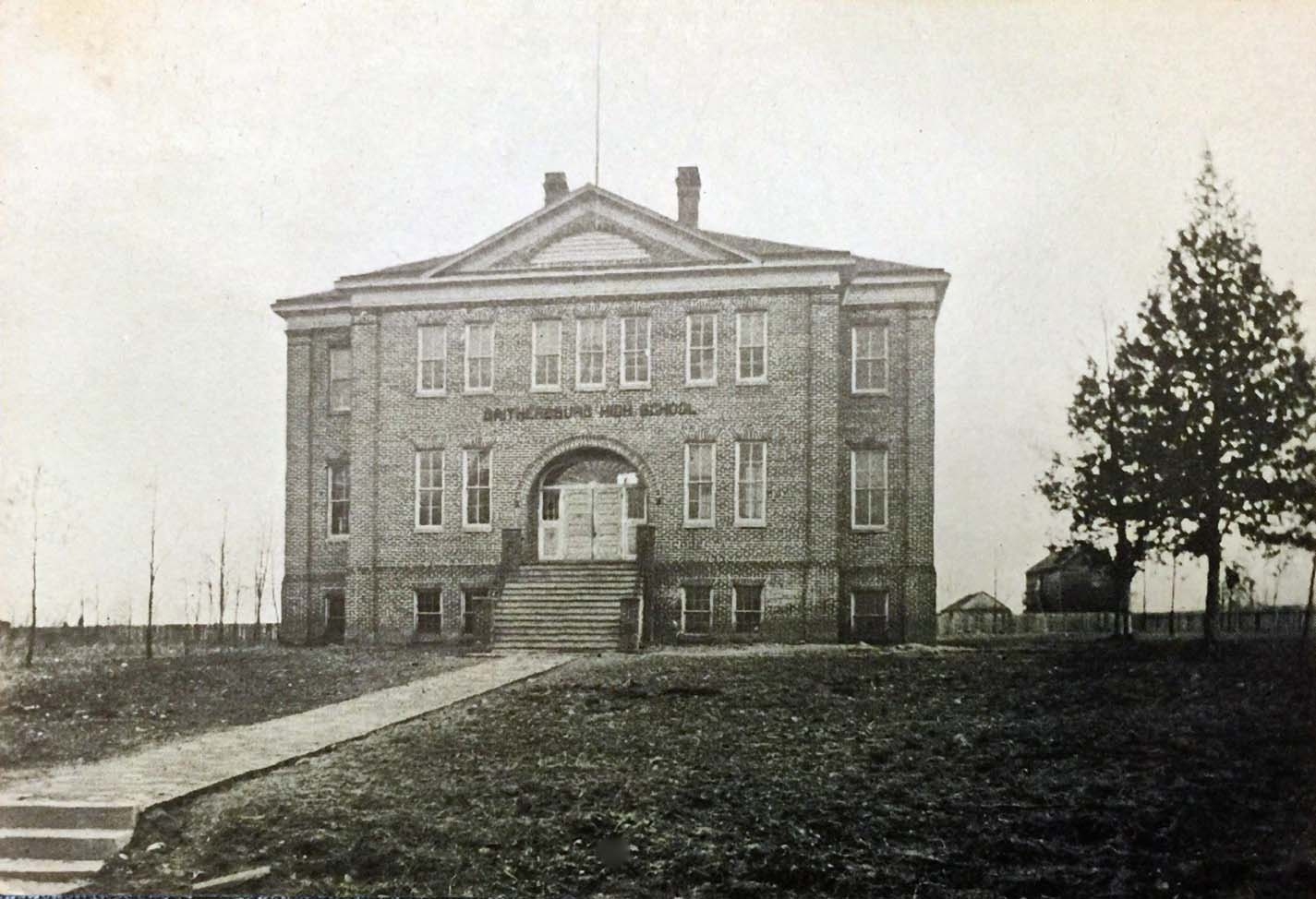
Gaithersburg High School, c. 1908

Gaithersburg High School was established in 1904 as the second high school in Montgomery County, Maryland. The school was originally located on North Summit Avenue, the site of present-day Gaithersburg Elementary School. The first classes began in the fall of 1905, with lower grades 1–7, and a three-year high school program. The school graduated its first class of three students in 1907. A fourth year of high school was added in 1917, with the first students graduating from the four-year program in 1918. The education program was expanded to twelve years in 1931, with a kindergarten established the same year. The first class to graduate having completed the twelve-year program was the Class of 1936.

The school's newspaper, the Blue and Gold, and the yearbook, Sail On, were established in 1929, coordinated by student Russell Gloyd under the guidance of teacher Maude Broome. In the 1960s, the school's motto was "Knowledge is power!"

A unique semi-cylindrical gymnasium was built in 1941, and continued to serve the high school until 1956, and the elementary school until the 1980s, when it was the last portion of the former high school facility to be razed.

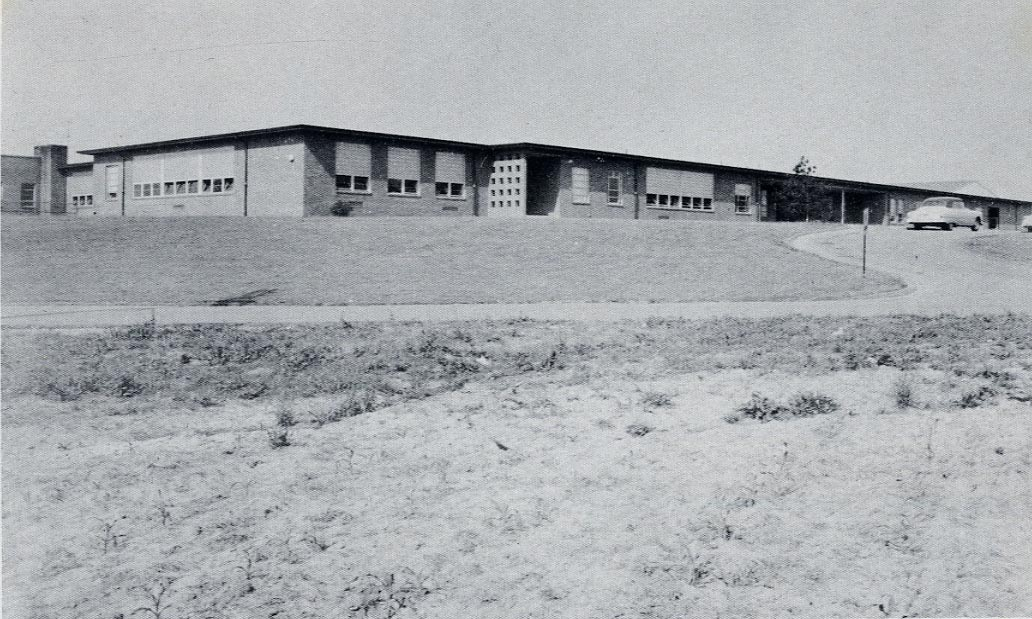
Gaithersburg High School's Sail On in 1957

In 1951, a new school building was constructed at the south end of South Summit Avenue, on the opposite side of town, serving grades 7–12. The lower grades (K–6) continued to be served in the original building, renamed Gaithersburg Elementary School. In 1960, grades 7 and 8 were transferred to the newly built Gaithersburg Junior High School. In 1963, the ninth grade freshmen and teachers were also transferred to the junior high school facility. The high school facility continued to support the three upper grades (10–12 only) until the fall of 1989 when the ninth grade returned as part of the county's transformation of junior high schools (grades 7–9) to middle schools (grades 6–8). The school continues to house the full four-year high school program.

The 1951-era school was expanded several times over the years, including a gymnasium (1957), several classroom additions (various dates), and an auditorium (1972). The original portions of the building were renovated in 1978.

=== 21st century ===
From 2011 to 2013, a replacement school building was constructed on the area that had been used as the school's parking lots. The athletic field and track were removed to install a geothermal heating system for the new facility. During this phase of construction, the school did not host home games. The new stadium, named for the school's long time coach and teacher, John Harvill, was ready for use in August 2012.

The project was completed in time for the beginning of the 2013–14 school year. The older building was razed, with the exception of Newman Auditorium (now the Newman Performing Arts Center, built in 1972), and a newer wing built in 2007, both of which had been updated and integrated into the new structure. Before 2013, the school building was sized at 68,184 square feet (1.5653 acres). The current facility is 431,178 square feet (9.8985 acres).

=== Location ===
The original high school was located about 650 feet (200 m) north of East Diamond Avenue on the east side of North Summit Avenue. The original structure was razed in 1959 and replaced with a modern elementary school, which has since been extensively renovated. The approximate address of the former building site is 55 North Summit Avenue, just north of the current elementary school entrance.

Since 1951, the school's campus has been located the west side of South Frederick Avenue in Gaithersburg, on a tract between South Summit Avenue and what is now Bohrer Park at Summit Hall Farm (previously the Summit Hall Turf Farm). The school's main entrance from 1951 until the 1970s was at the end of South Summit Avenue. After a second entrance to the school was added to provide direct access from Frederick Avenue, the school's address became 314 South Frederick Avenue.

With the opening of Bohrer Park in 1990, the newer entrance road was named Education Blvd., and a large sign was placed to indicate the entrance to both facilities. The present school building, opened in August 2013, has an address of 101 Education Blvd.

== Academics ==
Students at Gaithersburg High School average 955 on the SAT, with 488 on verbal and 467 on math.

As of 2024, Gaithersburg High School is the 110th-ranked high school in Maryland and the 6229th-ranked nationwide, according to U.S. News & World Report.

== Areas served ==
Gaithersburg High School serves students residing in Gaithersburg. It feeds from two middle schools and eight elementary schools.

- Forest Oak Middle School
  - Goshen Elementary School
  - Rosemont Elementary School
  - Summit Hall Elementary School
  - Harriet R. Tubman Elementary School
- Gaithersburg Middle School
  - Gaithersburg Elementary School
  - Laytonsville Elementary School
  - Strawberry Knoll Elementary School
  - Washington Grove Elementary School

Elementary School Split Articulations:

- The northern portion of Laytonsville ES articulates to John T. Baker Middle School and Damascus High School.

=== Boundary changes ===
With the opening of Tubman ES, the board of education approved boundaries that reassigned the following:

- Portions of Gaithersburg, Rosemont, and Washington Grove ES to Tubman ES
- A portion of Strawberry Knoll ES to Gaithersburg ES
- A portion of Summit Hall ES to Rosemont ES
- A portion of Rosemont ES to Washington Grove ES

With these changes, Washington Grove students would now attend Gaithersburg MS instead of Forest Oak MS.

As of the 2023-24 school year, Gaithersburg High School projects to be over-enrolled for the next 15 years with its current attendance zones. To address these concerns, along with overutilization among other nearby schools, the county is conducting a boundary study for the new Crown High School, whose site is within the Rosement ES boundaries and has an expected completion date of August 2027.

== Student demographics ==
In 2022, Gaithersburg High School reported that 59.6% of students were of Hispanic origins, 21.4% were African American, 9.6% were White, and 6.4% were Asian American The student population was 54% male and 46% female. 57.6% of students were eligible for free and reduced-price meals (FARMS).

== Sports ==
=== State champions ===
- 1961 Boys Cross Country
- 1965 Boys Track and Field
- 1966 Boys Track and Field
- 1971 Boys Cross Country
- 1986 Boys Track and Field
- 1986 Football
- 1992 Football
- 1998 Boys Basketball
- 1998 Boys Track and Field
- 2000 Boys Track and Field
- 2000 Football
- 2000 Boys Cross Country
- 2002 Boys Track and Field
- 2005 Girls Volleyball
- 2009 Boys Indoor Track & Field
- 2011 Girls Basketball State Champions
- 2012 Girls Basketball State Champions
- 2015 Boys Varsity Baseball State Champions

== Notable alumni ==
- Tosin Abasi, guitarist
- William Brown, NFL player
- Jeanine Cummins, best-selling author
- Floyd Cunningham, president of Asia-Pacific Nazarene Theological Seminary
- Dominique Dawes, Olympic gymnast
- Hank Fraley, NFL center
- Judah Friedlander, comedian and actor
- Tony Greene, NFL defensive back
- Jordan Hawkins, professional basketball player
- Logic, rapper
- Tom McHale, NFL offensive guard
- Malcolm Miller, NBA player
- Nick Mullen, podcaster
- David O'Connor, Olympic equestrian
- Guy Prather, NFL linebacker
- Mark Schenker, songwriter, producer, musician
- Eddie Stubbs, Grand Ole Opry announcer, DJ, fiddler, bluegrass historian
- J. Maarten Troost, author
- Jodie Turner-Smith, actor
- Jim Ward, NFL quarterback
