= Hugh C. Benner =

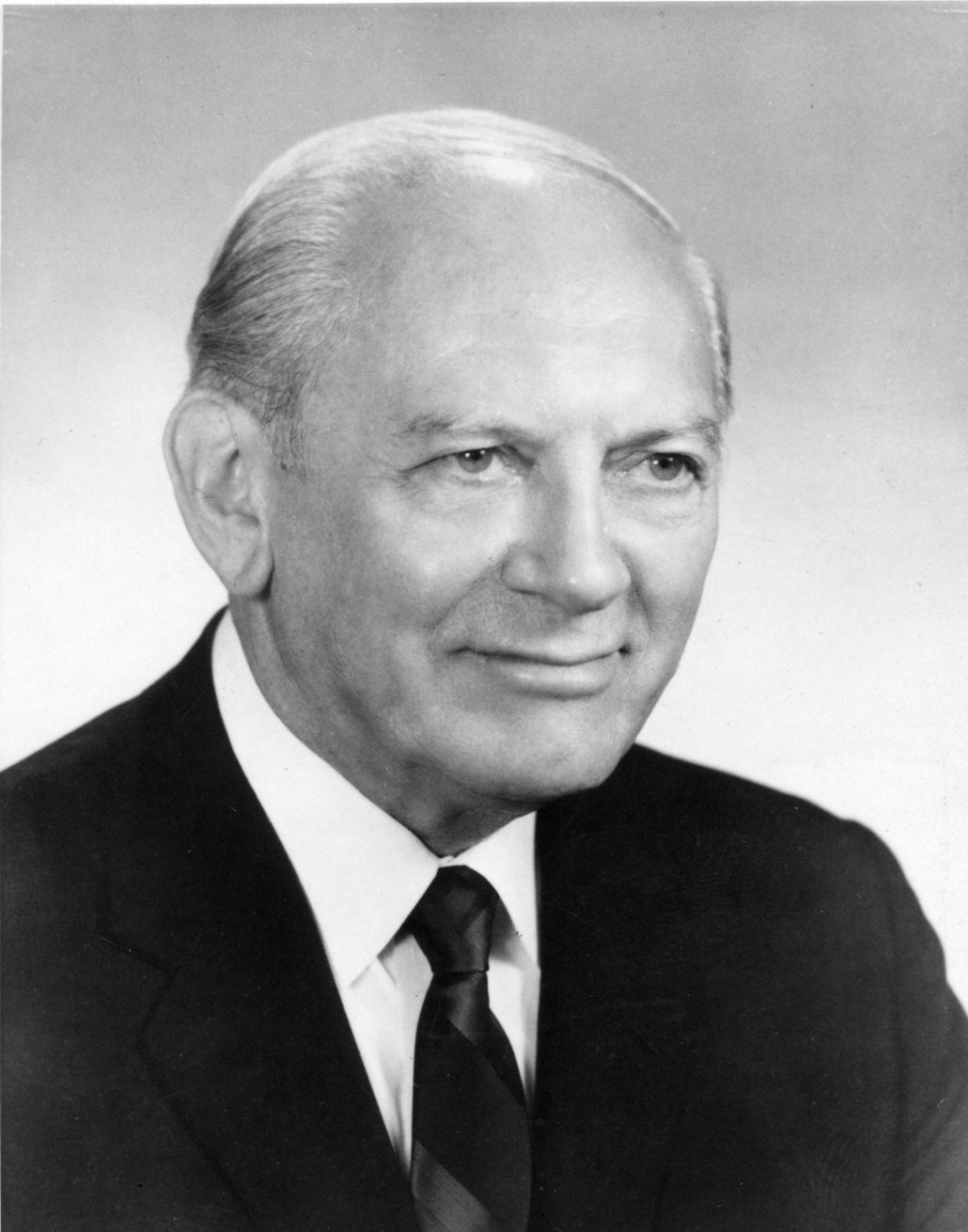
Hugh C. Benner, Church of the Nazarene minister and teacher

Hugh C. Benner (1899–1975) was a minister and general superintendent in the Church of the Nazarene. He started the history department at the Eastern Nazarene College in 1921, and Benner Hall and Benner Library on the campus of Olivet Nazarene University are named after him. Dr. Benner was born near Marion, Ohio. Dr. Benner was ordained in 1923 by Nazarene General Superintendent Roy T. Williams. After serving the Church as a college professor and later as a pastor at Santa Monica, California; Spokane, Washington; and Kansas City First Church, Dr. Benner was elected the first president of the Nazarene Theological Seminary in 1944. He was elected general superintendent in 1952 and served in this position until retirement in 1968. He was general superintendent emeritus until his death in 1975 in Leawood, Kansas.

== Early life and career ==
Hugh Clifford Benner was born on April 4, 1899 in Marion, Ohio. He grew up on a farm with 2 brothers. Benner attended Olivet Nazarene University where he was conductor of the University Band and Orchestra. This is where he met his wife, Audrey (nee Carroll). Benner earned his bachelor of science degree at Olivet in 1919 and later received degrees from Vanderbilt University, Boston University, and a master's degree in history from the University of Southern California. In 1923, he was ordained a Nazarene minister in Boston.
