= Ron Benefiel =

American theologian

Ron Benefiel was the eighth president of Nazarene Theological Seminary in Kansas City, Missouri. His term as president was July 2000 – June 2011. Benefiel served as the director of the School of Theology and Christian Ministry at Point Loma Nazarene University in San Diego California, and retired in the Spring of 2025.

During Benefiel's presidency, NTS embraced the challenge of becoming a "missional seminary serving a missional church." The school expanded its focus globally and began offering courses in new formats, including online and video conferencing. The seminary has more recently developed collaborative partnerships providing the opportunity for NTS coursework to be offered at several Nazarene college campuses.

While serving as a PLNU professor from 1996 to 2000, Benefiel co-founded and co-pastored Mid City Church of the Nazarene with John Wright, Ph.D., and David Whitelaw, D.Th. Mid City is now a multi-congregational church.

From 1982 to 1996, Benefiel served as pastor of the First Church of the Nazarene in Los Angeles, a multi-congregational church. He also founded and served as the executive director of the P.F. Bresee Foundation, a nonprofit community center in LA's Mid-Wilshire district.

Benefiel has always had a passion for serving his community, and his name has been highly respected within the Church of the Nazarene. Over the past 40 years, he has served the denomination on numerous councils and boards related to education, research, and youth ministry. His work in the community has included serving on the board of directors of the Kansas City Urban Youth Center and of rescue missions in Los Angeles, San Diego, and Kansas City.

Benefiel received his B.A., M.A., and an honorary Doctor of Letters degree from PLNU. He earned his Ph.D. in sociology from the University of Southern California.

He graduated from Point Loma Nazarene University with a A.B., M.A., Litt. D., and University of Southern California with a Ph.D.
