= South Pacific Nazarene Theological College =

- Motto: Holiness Unto the Lord
- Type: Bible College
- Established: 1974
- Chancellor: David Kerr
- Undergraduates: Bachelor of Theology, Diploma in Ministry, Certificate in Ministry
- Location: Samoa, Fiji, Vanuatu, Solomon Islands, Micronesia
- Colors: White, Ocean Blue, Green
- Website: www.spntc.org

South Pacific Nazarene Theological College (SPNTC) is an undergraduate theological and ministerial training college owned and operated by the Church of the Nazarene through its Division of World Mission. SPNTC is currently located in five countries; Samoa, Fiji, Vanuatu, and Solomon Islands, and Micronesia. SPNTC was established in 1974 in Ululoloa, Samoa, in order to train pastors for the Church of the Nazarene in the South Pacific. Its stated purpose says, "The mission of SPNTC is to equip and train men and women to fulfill the Great Commission of our Lord Jesus Christ from the Armenian-Wesleyan tradition.".

SPNTC's official website states that SPNTC's programs currently have over 150 students enrolled in the extension programs taught by SPNTC faculty, pastors, and district superintendents, allowing "a framework for students to follow in fulfilling their desire to be Christlike disciples and disciple-makers."
