= A. Skevington Wood =

English minister (1916–1993)

Arthur Skevington Wood FRHistS (21 April 1916 – 27 January 1993) was an English Methodist minister, college administrator, and church historian.

Wood was born in Ashbourne, Derbyshire and studied at the University of Leeds and Wesley College, Headingley before being ordained in 1943. He later obtained a PhD from Edinburgh University with a thesis on Thomas Haweis. He served as Principal of Cliff College from 1977 to 1984.

As a church historian, Wood is best known for his 1960 work, The Inextinguishable Blaze: Spiritual Renewal and Advance in the Eighteenth Century, published by Paternoster Press. In it Wood examines the message and influence of the First Great Awakening.
