= Asia-Pacific Nazarene Theological Seminary =

Religious institution in the Philippines

Coordinates: 14.577649°N 121.145575°E

- Motto: Bridging Cultures for Christ
- Type: Seminary
- Established: November 1983
- Location: Kaytikling, Taytay, Rizal, Philippines
- Campus: Suburban
- Hymn: "In Christ There is No East or West" (Words: William Dunkerley (1908); Music: Alexander R. Reinagle (1836))
- Colors: Maroon and white
- Website: apnts.edu.ph

Asia-Pacific Nazarene Theological Seminary (APNTS) is a graduate-level theological institution located near Metro Manila in the Philippines. APNTS is a seminary in the Wesleyan theological tradition and affiliated with the Church of the Nazarene through its Division of World Mission. Its mission is to prepare "men and women for Christ-like leadership and excellence in ministries." Its institutional vision is: "Bridging cultures for Christ, APNTS equips each new generation of leaders to disseminate the gospel of Jesus Christ throughout Asia, the Pacific, and the world.

== Academics ==
=== Accreditation and validation ===
Asia-Pacific Nazarene Theological Seminary is accredited by the Asia Theological Association (ATA) until 2011, the Philippine Association of Bible and Theological Schools (PABATS), and the Association for Theological Education in South East Asia (ATESEA). APNTS (04005 PS) is recognized by the Commission on Higher Education (CHEd), Republic of the Philippines to offer the following degrees: Master of Science in theology (048.1988), Master of Arts in Religious Education (048.1988), Master of Divinity (048.1988), Bachelor of Theology (048.1988) and Master of Arts in Christian Communication (030.1997). The Commission of Immigration and Deportation, Ministry of Justice, Republic of the Philippines, has approved APNTS as an educational institution for non-immigrant students.

Since 1984 APNTS has been a partner in the Asia Graduate School of Theology (AGST), Philippines, which offers Master of Theology (Th. M.), Doctor of Ministry (D.Min.), Doctor of Education (Ed.D.), Doctor of Missiology (D.Miss.), and Doctor of Philosophy (Ph.D.) programs. APNTS is a member of the Philippine Association of Graduate Education. APNTS is a member of the International Association of Methodist-related Schools, Colleges, and Universities (IAMSCU).

APNTS also participates with other institutions of the Church of the Nazarene through the International Board of Education (IBOE) in a validation program for preparation for ordination in the Church of the Nazarene.

=== Degrees offered ===
APNTS welcomes students from a variety of denominational backgrounds and affiliations. The Seminary actively aims to foster a holistic faith community where diversity of cultures is celebrated, and gender equality in leadership and opportunity is embraced.

APNTS offers a broad selection of degree programs. At Masters level, the Seminary offers:

- Master of Arts in Religious Education
- Master of Science in Theology
- Master of Arts in Christian Communication
- Master of Divinity
- Master of Arts in Intercultural Studies

At doctoral level, the Seminary offers:

- Doctor of Ministry in Transformational Ministry
- PhD in Holistic Child Development
- PhD in Transformational Learning
- PhD in Transformational Development

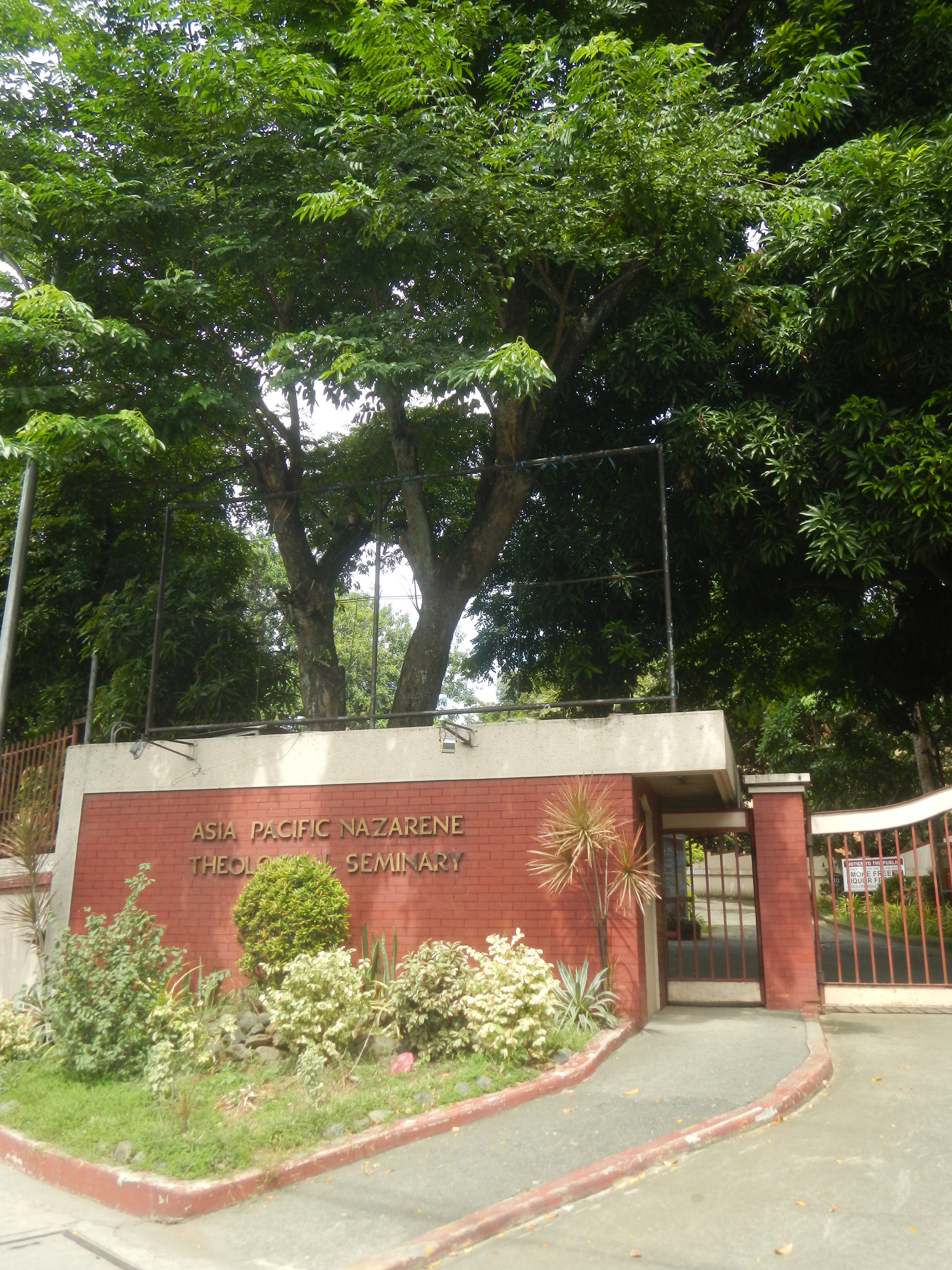
Gate

=== Student awards and prizes ===
The Frederick Buechner prizes for Excellence in Preaching and Excellence in Writing are awarded annually to students who have demonstrated merit in these two particular areas. The awards are named in honor of the acclaimed American theologian and author, Frederick Buechner.

== Governance and administration ==
Asia-Pacific Nazarene Theological Seminary is incorporated legally as a corporation in the Republic of the Philippines. Governance of APNTS is tasked by the articles of incorporation to the board of trustees who are elected usually every four years by members of the Church of the Nazarene in the Asia-Pacific Region. Ex-officio members are the APNTS President, Regional Director of the Asia-Pacific Region of the Church of the Nazarene, and the Regional Director of the Eurasia Region of the Church of the Nazarene. Members from each of the following fields of the Church of the Nazarene are elected to represent their geographic areas: Australia-New Zealand, Chinese Ministries, Japan, Korea, Melanesia (including Papua New Guinea), the Philippines, Sealands, South Asia, South East Asia, and South Pacific. The board of trustees meets annually in Manila, usually prior to the annual graduation ceremony in late March or early April, and elects from within its own group a chairperson, vice-chairperson, secretary and treasurer (the latter two being citizens of the Philippines as required by Philippine law). Administration of APNTS is tasked by the articles of incorporation to the President of APNTS, who is a member of the Church of the Nazarene, and the administrative council. The president is a member of the Church of the Nazarene elected by the board of trustees usually for a four-year term. The administrative council is nominated by the president and approved by the board of trustees. Dr Floyd T. Cunningham served as interim president of APNTS since 29 October 2007, but was elected unanimously as the fifth president in June 2008.

== History ==
=== Foundation and presidency of Donald D. Owens (1977–1984) ===
As early as 1948 (three years after the establishment of Nazarene Theological Seminary (NTS) in Kansas City, Missouri), there was a suggestion to establish a Nazarene seminary in Asia. In the mid-1970s, General Superintendent Eugene Stowe and Director of the World Mission Department of the Church of the Nazarene Jerald Johnson articulated the need for a graduate-level theological seminary for the denomination in Asia. On 19 January 1977 the General Board of the Church of the Nazarene approved a plan to establish a Far Eastern Nazarene Theological Semiinary (subsequently called Asia-Pacific Nazarene Theological Seminary) to serve the Asia and Pacific regions of the church because of the particular needs of the church in that part of the world. Donald Owens, Professor of Missions at Nazarene Theological Seminary in Kansas City and formerly a missionary to Korea, was elected to head the new seminary, which would become the first master's-level theological institution of the Church of the Nazarene located outside the United States.

After considerable discussion, in June 1978 the Board of General Superintendents approved Johnson's recommendation to locate APNTS in Manila, as it was hoped by Johnson that the cosmopolitan setting would provide models for evangelism for the other major cities of Asia and the Pacific. The Church of the Nazarene had directed its attentions to Metro Manila since 1976. Other considerations in favor of Manila were its proximity to an international airport and the possibility of its international students finding opportunities for ministry to their own people in the cosmopolitan area. Johnson and Owens decided to purchase the Children's Garden orphanage run by the Methodist church and formerly owned by the wealthy Tamayo family. The location consisted of 11 acres (4.5 hectares) that included a centrally located chapel, a two-story crafts center, 15 dormitory cottages, a gymnasium, and an office building. The purchase was completed in early 1979. However, changes in administrative responsibilities after the general assembly of June 1980, which resulted in Johnson's election as one of the six general superintendents, and L. Guy Nees being elected as the new director of World Mission, and the subsequent appointment of Owens as director of the Asia Region, caused some reappraisal of the siting of APNTS in Manila. Ultimately, at the instigation of Owens and Johnson, and the recommendation of Nees, it was decided that APNTS would be located in Manila after all.

Beginning in January 1980, extension seminars of two fortnight-long intensive modules were held in January each year, involving several NTS professors as well as Angelito Agbuya, pastor of the Angeles City, Philippines, Church of the Nazarene. Owens and Willard Taylor, dean of NTS, taught the initial two modules, and other NTS professors (including Paul Bassett and Paul Orjala) taught in subsequent years. Students represented various countries in the Asia and South Pacific regions

Owens moved to Manila in 1980 and began arguing that APNTS ought to be a distinct entity, rather than an extension of NTS. As extension classes were held over the next few years, general church leaders decided that the new seminary should become autonomous from NTS, with its own board of trustees and corporate identity. On 22 September 1982, upon the recommendation of Owens, the World Mission Division officially renamed the school Asia-Pacific Nazarene Theological Seminary.

In preparation for the opening of a residential program, Owens searched for faculty members. Owens saw the necessity of developing a resident and increasingly Asian and Pacific faculty, which could apply the church's theology to the contexts of the students. On 27 September 1982, the Board of General Superintendents approved a faculty nominated by Owens that included two Asians and two Westerners: Ronald Beech, missionary in the Philippines since 1962, who had completed a doctorate at Asia Baptist Graduate Theological Seminary in Baguio; Angelito Agbuya, pastor of the growing Angeles City church, and taking doctoral work in education; Alexander Verughese, a native of India, then teaching at Eastern Nazarene College and completing his doctorate at Drew University in Old Testament; and Floyd Cunningham, a doctoral candidate in history at Johns Hopkins University. Verguhese later withdrew due to his health, and Agbuya decided to remain in Angeles City and teach at APNTS only part-time. Consequently, Beech was responsible for setting up the camps, writing the first catalogue, and establishing a curriculum based on that offered by NTS.

The existing buildings on the campus were renovated for student and faculty living, and a new two-storey administration and classroom building (now named Owens Hall in honour of the founding president) was constructed. The ground-breaking ceremony was held on 6 January 1983. The first Work and Witness team to serve at APNTS came in January 1983 from Australia to renovate one of the wooden cottages to be used as a dormitory for male students, while Agbuya taught in one of the modules.

On 3 August 1983, the Commission on Immigration and Deportation, Department of Justice, Republic of the Philippines, gave its approval for APNTS to begin as an educational institution for non-immigrant students. Floyd Cunningham arrived 5 November 1983, having just completed the defence of his doctoral dissertation and regular classes began on 14 November 1983 with three full-time and 20 part-time students, all from the Philippines. The faculty included Owens, Agbuya, Dr. Ronald and Mrs. Neva Beech (long-time missionaries in the Philippines), and Dr. Floyd Cunningham. The seminary was formally dedicated and the faculty installed on 15 January 1984. Owens chose the motto of the school, "Bridging cultures for Christ," and the school's logo. Mrs Neva Beech suggested the school hymn, "In Christ There is No East or West", which was based on Matthew 8:11. Soon after, Owens resigned as president of APNTS as he felt that maintaining both jobs, regional director of Asia and president of the school, was too much.

=== Presidency of E. LeBron Fairbanks (1984–1989) ===
In April 1984, E. LeBron Fairbanks, formerly academic dean of European Nazarene Bible College and at the time teaching at Southern Nazarene University, was elected president of the seminary by the Board of General Superintendents. He began serving in the office in July 1984, and he and his wife Anne and son Stephen moved to Manila later that year. Fairnbanks would continue as the second president of APNTS until July 1989, at which time he accepted election as president of Mt Vernon Nazarene College.

In July 1984 the first foreign students (from India and South Korea) enrolled, and a student body organization was established with Abner Valenzuela elected as first president. Fairbanks turned his attention to separating and transferring the financial records and administration of the school from the regional office to the seminary, and to helping the faculty articulate a mission statement for APNTS.

The first graduation was held on 5 April 1986, with General Superintendent Eugene Stowe as speaker. Clemente Haban (Philippines) and Jayaraj Krishnan (India) received Master of Divinity degrees, and Carolina Binavince (Philippines) and Kim Soung-gon (South Korea) received Master of Religious Education degrees. In planning for the future of APNTS, Fairbanks and Jim Edlin, the academic dean (1986–1988), wanted to expand the number of Asian and South Pacific faculty members as quickly possible. Wilfredo Manaois from the Visayas region of the Philippines joined the faculty in 1986.

Meanwhile, Fairbanks decided that it was in the best interests of the school to secure recognition from the Philippine Department of Education, Culture and Sports (DECS), in spite of the fact that virtually no seminaries in the Philippines had this standing. This required legal incorporation, which was secured. The rationale behind the decision to pursue recognition was to enable non-Filipino students to come on student visas. In addition, if the school were recognized by the government, it would enhance the reputation of the school. Graduates could receive "special order" numbers from the government that validated their degrees. Beginning the process in 1985, Fairbanks met with top level government department officials. On 6 December 1986, the Seminary secured its permit to operate, and on 17 August 1988, full recognition of its various degree programs. Accreditation for degree programs was also granted by the Asian Theological Association (ATA) in 1988, and by the Association for Theological Education in South East Asia (ATESEA) in 1991.

Meanwhile, the library was strengthened with the addition of several important collections centering on Wesleyan and holiness studies, and came to number over 32,000 volumes by 2005.

At the same time, extensive renovation and building programs on campus continued. Those who have served as Campus Development co-ordinators have been:

- Gordon Gibson (1984–1902)
- Terry Sanders (1992–1998)
- Greg Taylor (1998–1999, 2004–present)
- David Hendrix (1999–2004)

Fairbanks resigned from APNTS in July 1989 in order to accept the presidency of Mount Vernon Nazarene College in Ohio.

=== Presidency of John M. Nielson (1989–2001) ===
After the resignation of Fairbanks, John M. Nielson, then vice president of Eastern Nazarene College, and formerly a missionary for the Church of the Nazarene to Denmark, was elected third president of APNTS in November 1989. He and his wife Janice Nielson settled in Manila in February 1990.

Nielson's philosophy of administration stressed:

1. Transition and progress by continuity;
2. Building consensus rather than operating by decree or by majority;
3. Commitment to delegated authority;
4. Accessibility to faculty and students (with recognition as well for the need for privacy);
5. Unity, equitability, fairness;
6. The Servanthood model;
7. Facilitation of the purpose of the institution.

Nielson placed a high priority on worship and took personal interest in chapel services. With a donation of funds in honor of Anna Wooten, Nielson set about renovating the outdoor chapel so that it could be used for regular chapel services. He began having national culture days that would convey understanding among students from various nationalities. Janice Nielson played the organ, taught Christian education of children courses, and began Kid's Klubs.

Over the 12 years of his presidency, Nielson raised about US$200,000 for endowments, scholarships and various projects. At the same time he secured additional funds from the general church. He also oversaw the beginnings of computerized systems in accounting, in registrar's records, and in the library, and secured better funding for regional faculty members. He initiated agreements with sister holiness denominations for scholarships for students. Discussions with the Wesleyan Church culminated in that denomination's appointment of and support for Dr. Stanley Clark who served full-time from 2000 to 2004 teaching Christian education. In exchange, Wesleyan students received the same tuition and housing benefits as Nazarene students. He also oversaw revision of the student constitution, and the student handbook.

In 1993 the Asia-Pacific region established a media center on campus, the Fairbanks Media Center, which enabled APNTS to begin a communication major within the Master of Arts (Religious Education) (MARE) program. In 1996 the Commission on Higher Education gave recognition to a Master of Arts Christian Communication (MACC)degree program. Also in 1996 the faculty publication of the Mediator began. The Philippines' CHED required graduate schools to issue a journal. The Mediator (ISSN 1655-4175) seeks to communicate to the APNTS constituency and graduates. It provides a forum and vehicle for faculty publications and seeks contributions from graduates and other interested parties. Several times each year "The Bridge" newsletter is published and distributed.

Increased attention to English as a second language came with the appointment of Beverly Gruver in 1997.

Over the years Nielson defended the international purpose and mission of APNTS. He established within students a "Christ-culture" consciousness that transcended social differences. In November 2000 Nielson secured a revision of the composition of the board of trustees to include more Asia Pacific region members, and election of them by fields.

The Nielsons left in 2001 for European Nazarene Bible College (now European Nazarene College)where Dr Nielson became the Academic Dean. Dr Floyd Cunningham, a foundation faculty member, and academic dean of APNTS, was appointed Officer in Charge in September 2001. In 2002 the Master of Science of Theology program was developed to help prepare graduates for teaching courses at undergraduate Bible and Theological Colleges and for further graduate work by requiring a thesis.

=== Presidency of Hitoshi "Paul" Fukue (2003–2007) ===
In January 2003, the Board of Trustees chose Hitoshi "Paul" Fukue as president of APNTS, thus becoming the first president indigenous to the Asia-Pacific region. In 2001, Hitoshi and Mitsuko Fukue had become full-time faculty at APNTS. Fukue had served as a pastor in Japan for more than 20 years, and had earned a Th.D. at Boston University, studying sociology of religion. He began serving as an adjunct professor at APNTS in 1992. Mitsuko had earned an MEd at Boston University and taught both interpersonal and intercultural communication. Fukue was inaugurated as the fourth president of APNTS in April 2003.

Through adjunct professors Charles and Carolyn Seiffert, the Free Methodist Church signed an agreement with APNTS, similar to the agreement that the school had with the Wesleyan Church, that Free Methodist students would receive the same privileges as Nazarene and Wesleyan students so long as the Free Methodist Church sponsored an APNTS faculty member.

Since 2001, extensive campus development has taken place. At the center of campus now stands the Nielson Center for Education and Evangelism, a large, five-storey multi-purpose building which houses the media center for the Asia-Pacific region in the basement, and the seminary administration and the offices for the Philippine Field of the Church of the Nazarene on the first floor. The second floor will be a large auditorium, the third floor a new state of the art library, and the fourth floor more offices and classrooms. Other projects have been new and renovated housing for students and faculty. On 23 March 2007 the Fox Library (located on the third floor of the NCEE building) was dedicated. Completion of the NCEE building and more development is in the plans for the coming years.

In 2004 the Donald D. Owens School of World Mission (DOSWM) was inaugurated by the board of trustees as a resource for training students for effective mission service. Its goal is to become the premier missionary training institution for the Church of the Nazarene. Each year it sponsors the Owens Lectures. Those giving the Owens Lectures have been Dr Donald Owens (2004), Dr Robert Coleman (2005) and Philip Parshall (2006). The current director of the DOSWM is Robert Donahue.

In 1985, E. Lebron Fairbanks, former president of APNTS, envisioned a media education and production center. His vision became a reality when the Fairbanks Media Center, now known as WM Communications Asia–Pacific (WMC–AP) was established in 1994 and began offering the region's only Master of Arts program in Christian Communication (MACC). In 2004 the Fairbanks School of Communication (FSC) was instituted by the board of trustees in order to effectively communicate the gospel in the 21st century through the creative use of media and technology. "High tech facilities, dedicated faculty, creative students, and a vision to “communicate Christ…by all means possible,” are the ingredients for a dynamic communication studies program at Asia-Pacific Nazarene Theological Seminary (APNTS) in Manila, Philippines." Since its inception in June 2006, the FSC has offered informal training, seminars, workshops, and focus programs conducted to prepare ministers for effective ministry through media. The FSC is headed by Professor Kwon, Dong Hwan (Bill) as director. Working with Professor Kwon is an international team of instructors from the US, Japan, New Zealand, and the Philippines, offering a variety of academic, media and ministry experiences. On 16 December 2006 World Mission Communications Asia-Pacific (WMC AP) and Asia-Pacific Nazarene Theological Seminary (APNTS) signed a five-year memorandum of agreement (MOA) establishing the Fairbanks School of Communications (FSC) on the campus of APNTS. This agreement allows FSC to receive support from both partners in terms of funding and donated properties for production equipment, a media laboratory, media professional advice and supervision, and a yearly operational budget for the agreed-upon time frame. In November 2008, the FSC was re-launched as the Fairbanks International School of Communications (FISC).

In 2004 the board of trustees also decided to create APNTS Partners, an organization devoted to raising support for APNTS. The APNTS Partnership is open to all who seek to provide support through prayer, professional and technical assistance and fundraising.

In January 2006 a team of faculty, alumni and student members of the computer science department of Mount Vernon Nazarene University led by Tim Myatt and Jim Skon, built a new complete gigabit optical network backbone based on the equipment the team brought. Students involved in this project included Jesse Hildebrand, Jared Miller and Thomas Seabrooks. This included rebuilding the campus server room from the ground up. The new network was interconnected with a newly installed fiber optic backbone, providing reliable gigabit speed connections among all major buildings on the APNTS campus.

During 2006 an accelerated English program was introduced to teach English but also to train APNTS students in teaching English as Second or Foreign Language as part of the denomination's mission strategy in evangelising creative access nations. The former Fairbanks Media Center building on the APNTS campus was renovated by a team from the Nazareth Church of the Nazarene of South Korea during August 2006 to serve as a center for the AEP program and visiting Work and Witness teams, and renamed Nazareth Hall in their honour. In March 2007 the board of trustees decided to inaugurate the Fukue Institute of Accelerated English Studies, in honor of Dr and Mrs Fukue.

Fukue announced his resignation as APNTS president in January 2007 and concluded his responsibilities in May 2007. He returned to Japan to pastor a church in his homeland. The academic dean, Floyd Cunningham, served as officer in charge.

=== Presidency of Floyd T Cunningham (2008 to present) ===
At the end of October 2007, the APNTS Board of Trustees unanimously elected Academic Dean Dr Floyd T Cunningham to serve as interim president of APNTS for a period of two years. Upon his election, Cunningham stated, "As a graduate school in the Wesleyan tradition, APNTS has a great mission to prepare men and women for Christlike leadership and excellence in ministries. We will endeavor to 1) energize students to fulfill the world mission of Jesus Christ, 2) build a creative team of professors and staff, 3) expand holiness graduate education through distance programs, and 4) reach out to the local community."

In June 2008, the board of trustees of Asia-Pacific Nazarene Theological Seminary in Manila, Philippines, unanimously elected Floyd Cunningham as the seminary's fifth president. According to Neville Bartle, chairman of the board of trustees:

“The Board has been impressed with the leadership that Dr. Cunningham has given to the seminary as interim president. We were impressed by Dr. Cunningham’s commitment to the seminary over the past 25 years. As a person who has studied the history of Christianity in Asia and especially of the Church of the Nazarene in Asia, we felt that he had the background knowledge of the region that will give us good direction and vision for the future.”(NCN News 3 July 2008)

Cunningham was installed as the fifth president of APNTS in the Wooten Chapel on the APNTS campus on 20 November 2008, on the occasion of the 25th anniversary of the founding of APNTS.

== Missional effectiveness ==
APNTS graduates have gone on to pastoral, teaching, missionary, administrative and many other forms of ministry in various countries, including: Australia, Bangladesh, Canada, Hong Kong, India, Indonesia, Japan, Kenya, Myanmar, New Zealand, Papua New Guinea, the Philippines, Samoa, South Africa, South Korea, Taiwan, Thailand, Ukraine, and the United States of America.

After 25 years of service to the church over 325 APNTS graduates remain in ministry in Asia and the Pacific. According to its leaders, the purpose of the school, to offer a quality graduate theological education to the people of Asia and the Pacific, has borne and continues to bear fruit.

== Faculty and staff ==
Current faculty members are:

- Floyd T. Cunningham (1983 to current), Distinguished Professor in Church History, author of Holiness Abroad: Nazarene Missions in Asia
- Robert C. Donahue (1999 to current), Missions and Urban Ministry
- Doug Flemming (1997-current), Communications
- Beverly Gruver (1997 to current), English as a Second Language
- Rovina Hatcher (2006 to current), Christian Education
- Kwon, Dong Hwan "Bill" (2004 to current), Communication

=== Former faculty members ===
Among those who have served as permanent on-campus faculty members are:

- David A. Ackerman (1999–2002, 2004 to 2008), Biblical Studies, author of Lo, I Tell You a Mystery: Cross, Resurrection, and Paraenesis in the Rhetoric of 1 Corinthians (Princeton Theological Monograph) (Pickwick, 2006)
- Abraham Athially (1992–1998), Pastoral Ministry
- Ronald W. Beech (1983–1992), Biblical Studies and Theology
- Neva J. Beech (1983–1992), Music
- Christi-an Bennett (2000–2002), Church History
- Stephen Bennett (2000–2002), Old Testament
- Stanley Clark (2000–2004), Christian Education
- James O. Edlin (1985–1988), Old Testament, author of Lectio Divina, 1 Corinthians (Beacon Hill Press) and co-author of Discovering the Old Testament: Story and Faith (Beacon Hill Press)
- Dean E. Flemming (1987–1992, 1993–1997), New Testament, author of Contextualization in the New Testament: Patterns for Theology and Mission(IVP, 2005)
- M. Robert Fraser (1988–1992), Church History
- Hitoshi "Paul" Fukue (2001 to 2007), Theology and Christian Ethics
- Mitsuko Fukue (2001 to 2007), Communication
- David Kelly (1993–1994), Biblical Studies
- Joven LaRoya (1999–2001), Christian Education
- Roderick T. Leupp (1992–2000), Theology, author of Knowing the Name of God: A Trinitarian Tapestry of Grace, Faith and Community (IVP, 1996) and The Renewal of Trinitarian Theology: Themes, Patterns & Explorations (IVP Academic, October 2008)
- Stephanie Brank Leupp (1990–2000), Library
- Lourdes Manaois (1987–1991, 1993–1999), Christian Education
- Wilfredo Manaois (1986–1999), Christian Education
- Gilbert L. Montecastro (2002 to 2006), Biblical Studies
- Janice Nielson (1990–2001), Christian Education
- John M Nielson (1990–2001), Pastoral ministry
- Won Keun Oh (2004 to 2007), Biblical Studies
- Geneva Silvernail (2006 to current), Christian Education
- Donald LeRoy Stults (1987–1991), Missions, author of Developing an Asian Evangelical Theology (OMF, 1989) and "Turning to the East", and Grasping Truth and Reality: Lesslie Newbigin's Theology of Mission to the Western World (Wipf and Stock, 2008)
- Dr Dwight D. Swanson (1995–1997), Old Testament, author of The Temple Scroll and the Bible: The Methodology of 11Qt (Studies on the Texts of the Desert of Judah) (Brill, 1995) and editor of "The Daily Gazelle".

Visiting professors who have taught at APNTS include:

- Angelito O. Agbuya Ph.D., Ed.D.
- Terry L. Baldridge Ph.D. (1994)
- Neville Bartle D. Miss
- Daniel Behr,
- Robert Bickert
- Alfonso G. Pablo Sr. General Superintendent Emeritus, the Wesleyan Church of the Philippines
- Alex. Varughese Ph.D., author of Listening for God Through James (Lectio Divina series),(Beacon Hill Press) editor of Discovering the Bible: Story And Faith of the Biblical Communities (Beacon Hill Press, 2006), and Discovering The New Testament: Community And Faith (Beacon Hill Press, 2005)

== See also ==
- Nazarene International Education Association
- List of Church of the Nazarene schools
