= Edwin Lewis =

American Methodist theologian (1881-1959)

Edwin Lewis (1881–1959) was an American Methodist theologian primarily associated with Drew University in New Jersey.

== Biography ==
Born in Newbury, Berkshire, England, Lewis became a Methodist local preacher at the age of seventeen. In 1900 he traveled to Newfoundland, Canada as a missionary before continuing his education in the United States. He eventually became a professor of theology at Drew.

Lewis' early work demonstrates the influence of Boston personalism, a school of Protestant liberal theology widespread among Methodists during the first half of the 20th century, and British idealism. His book Jesus Christ and the Human Quest is an example of his early perspective. In the book, Lewis argues that the Christian faith has its foundation in the nature of persons and personhood.

In 1929 he was named one of three editors of the Abingdon Bible Commentary. While preparing the massive reference work, Lewis claimed to have "rediscovered the Bible" for himself. He reacted strongly to the 1931 report Re-Thinking Missions: A Laymen's Inquiry after One Hundred Years, which he believed hampered the Christian missionary effort, in his article "The Re-thought Theology of the Re-thinking of Missions" which appeared in the Christian Century.

Growing more suspicious of the subjective theological liberalism of the day, he published A Christian Manifesto in 1934. In the book, Lewis railed against liberal theology (which he referred to as modernism), reasserting classical Christian themes such as the transcendence of God, the sinfulness of humankind, the divinity of Christ, and the objective work of the atonement.

Lewis wrote: "No statement of Christian belief which does not include a supernatural reference...is a true statement."

He followed A Christian Manifesto with A Philosophy of Christian Revelation and The Creator and the Adversary, both of which continued his reclamation of Christian orthodoxy from an Arminian perspective. Lewis argued that God triumphs over evil by outsuffering and outloving his adversary.

Lewis contributed sixty signed articles to the original edition of Harper's Bible Dictionary first published in 1952.

He died at Morristown Memorial Hospital on November 28, 1959, after a long illness.

Lewis' work proved influential to an entire generation of Methodist theologians, notably Carl Michalson and Albert C. Outler.

== Works ==
=== Books ===
- Jesus Christ and the Human Quest. New York, NY: The Abingdon Press, 1924.
