= Korea Nazarene University =

University in Cheonan, South Korea

Coordinates: 36.7951°N 127.1190°E

- 나사렛대학교
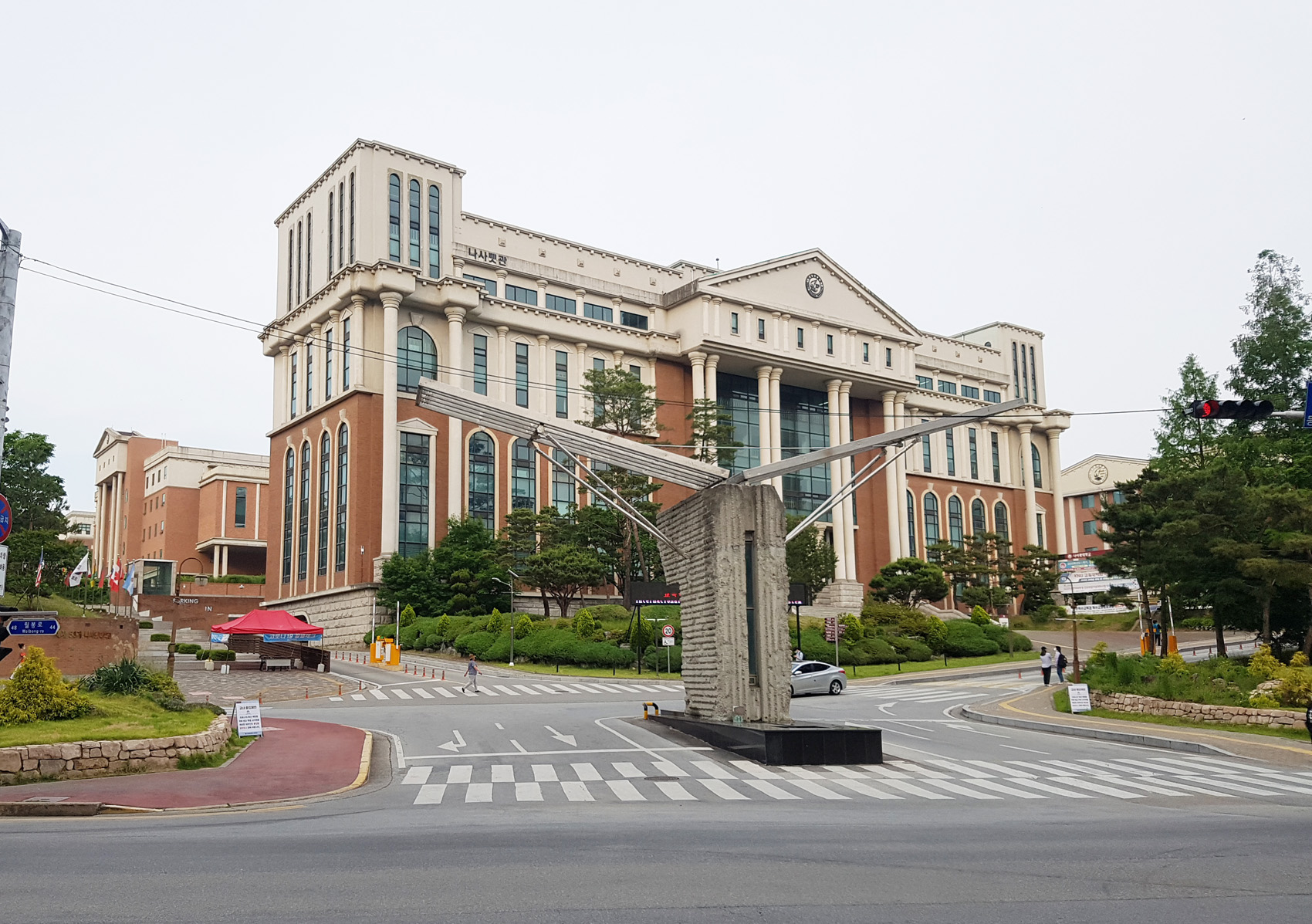
- Type: Private
- Established: 1954
- President: David Kyungsoo Kim
- Location: 456 Ssangyong-dong, Cheonan, Chungnam, South Korea
- Website: www.kornu.ac.kr (Korean) cms.kornu.ac.kr/io (English)

Korean name
- Hangul: 나사렛대학교
- Hanja: 나사렛大學校
- RR: Nasaret daehakgyo
- MR: Nasaret taehakkyo

Korea Nazarene University is a Christian university located in Cheonan, Republic of Korea.

== Formation ==
Korea Nazarene University was founded as Korea Nazarene Bible College in Seoul in 1954 by Donald Owens and his wife, Adeline, both American missionaries of the Church of the Nazarene.

KNU first gained the status of being a four-year college in 1992.

In 1993, the Nazarene Theological College Press was established. In 1994 and 1995, a number of new departments were added.

== Organization ==
KNU has 34 majors in 4 different categories.

=== Liberal Arts (안문교학부) ===
Division of Christian Studies 기독교학부, Owens International College 오웬스제학부, Division of Social Welfare 사회복지학, Department of Secretarial Administration 비서행정학과, Department of English 영어학과, Department of Chinese 중국학과, Department of Police Administration 경찰행정학과, Department of Real Estate 부동산학과, Department of Business Administration 경영학과, Department of Hotel & Tourism Management 호텔관광경영학과, Department of Psychological Rehabilitation 심리재활학, Department of Human Rehabilitation 인간재활학과, Department of Rehabilitation Independence 재활자립학과, Department of Sign Language Interpreting 수화통역학과, Department of Communication Disorders 언어치료학과, Department of Braille: Library &Information Science 점자문헌정보학과, and Department of Child Studies 아동학과.

=== Teacher Training (사범계열) ===
Department of Early Childhood Special Education유아특수교육과, Department of Secondary Special Education중등특수교육과, and Department of Special Education특수교육과.

=== Natural Science (자연계열) ===
Division of Eco Design 에코디자인학부, Division of Character Design 캐릭터디자인학부, Department of Digital Contents 디지털콘텐츠학꽈, Department of Broadcast Media 방송미디어학과, Department of Information & Communication 정보통신학과, Department of Multimedia 멀티미디어학과, Department of Nursing 간호학과, Department of Physical Therapy 물리치료학과, Department of Emergency Rescue 응급구조학과, Department of Biomedical Laboratory Science 임상병리학과, Department of Adapted Physical Activity 장애인제육지두학과, and Department of Rehabilitation Engineering &Assistive Technology 재활공학과.

=== Arts and Physical Fitness (예체능계열) ===
Division of Music 음악학부, and Department of Taekwondo태권도선교학

== Global Network ==
Sister Universities Eastern Nazarene College, Mid-America Nazarene University, Northwest Nazarene University, Olivet Nazarene University, Point Loma Nazarene University, Southern Nazarene University1, Mount Vernon Nazarene University, California New Hope University, University of Northern Colorado, 북경합대학교 (중국), 오비린대학교 (일본), Mississippi University, 남경사법대학교 (중국), Nazarene Theological College (호주), La Pacific Nazarene Theological Seminary (필리핀), West Visayas State University (필리핀).

== See also ==
- List of Church of the Nazarene schools
