= Cliff College =

Christian theological college in Hope Valley, UK

Coordinates: 53°15′44″N 1°37′36″W

Cliff College is a Christian theological college in Hope Valley, Derbyshire, United Kingdom.

== History ==
Cliff College was founded by Thomas Champness in 1883, initially meeting in Champness' home before moving to Castleton Hall. After Champness' retirement, the Wesleyan Methodist church took over the work and moved the college to its current location in Calver in 1904.

A. Skevington Wood served as Principal from 1977 to 1984.

== Organisation and administration ==
There are currently about 30 full-time undergraduates, 80 part-time undergraduates and 100 part-time postgraduates. There are also a number of research (MPhil and PhD) students and full-time postgraduates enrolled at the College. College courses up to and including MA level are validated by University of Manchester, and students at higher levels are jointly enrolled at both institutions. The college hosts the UK headquarters of the Girls' Brigade.

=== Programmes of study ===
Undergraduate degrees, Master's degrees and research programmes are validated by the University of Manchester, and the college also run a broad range of short courses, validated by a Cliff College Certificate.

=== Faculty ===
Since the summer of 2017, the principal of Cliff College has been Rev Ashley Cooper. The vice principal (academic) is Rev Dr Andrew Stobart, and the director of Academic Delivery is Dr Sandra Brower.

== Festival ==
Each year, over the May Whitsun Bank Holiday (late bank holiday in May), the college holds an annual all age Cliff Festival event which includes worship, bible study, a variety of seminars, entertainment and outdoor activities led by tutors of the college, as well as outside guests.

== Notable alumni ==
=== Hulme Cliff College ===
- Susan Strachan, Irish evangelical missionary and co-founder of the Latin American Mission (LAM)
- Henry Strachan, Canadian-born Scottish Minister, missionary and co-founder of the Latin American Mission (LAM)
