= Melanesia Nazarene Bible College =

- Type: Bible College
- Established: 1964
- Undergraduates: 157
- Location: Ningei, Western Highlands Province, Papua New Guinea
- Campus: Rural
- Colors: Red and White
- Website: http://www.mnbc.asia

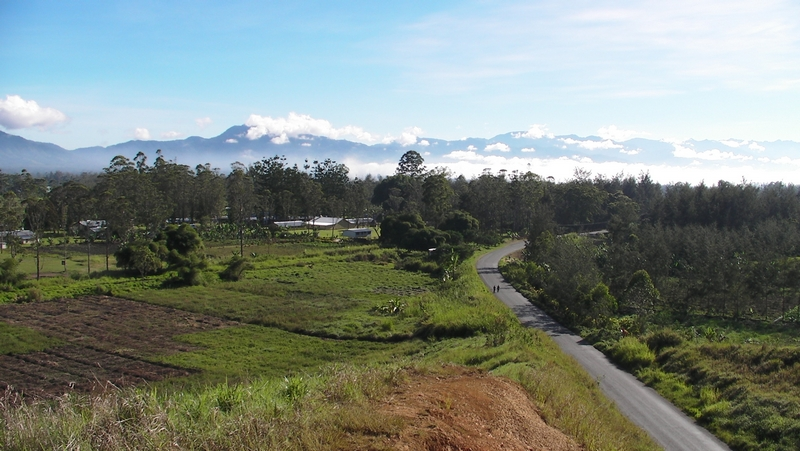
MNBC Campus looking East along the Highlands Highway

Melanesia Nazarene Bible College (MNBC) is an undergraduate theological and ministerial training college owned and operated by the Church of the Nazarene through its Division of World Mission. MNBC is located near Mount Hagen, Papua New Guinea (PNG). MNBC was established in 1964 at Water Tun to train pastors for the Church of the Nazarene in Papua New Guinea, but is now located at Ningei, near the junction of Kindeng road and the Wara Tuman river. Its stated purpose is "to provide training, with an emphasis upon holiness of life, for pastors and church leaders to carry on the work of the Church of the Nazarene in Melanesia".

The official website states that "MNBC’s residential program currently has over 157 students enrolled, with another 30 students enrolled in the extension programs taught by MNBC faculty, pastors, and district superintendents." In September 2009 MNBC graduated 43 students.

Since its inception MNBC has trained missionaries who have been sent to the Solomon Islands, East Timor, and Vanuatu, as well as ministers who have planted churches and developed ministry centres across Papua New Guinea.
