= Nazarene Theological Seminary =

Church of the Nazarene seminary in Kansas City, Missouri, U.S.

- Type: Private seminary
- Established: 1945
- Religious affiliation: Nazarene
- President: Jeren Rowell
- Postgraduates: 169
- Location: Kansas City, Missouri, United States; 39.008830°N 94.566750°W
- Campus: Urban
- Colors: Blue, Silver
- Website: www.nts.edu

Nazarene Theological Seminary (NTS) is a Nazarene seminary in Kansas City, Missouri. The seminary was established by the Eleventh General Assembly in June 1944 and started its first school year in 1945 with 61 students. It moved to its current location in 1950. The seminary offers master's degrees in Divinity, Transformational Leadership, Black Leadership in Ministry, and Theological Studies as well as a Doctor of Ministry degree (D.Min.) and non-degree programs.

For the 2025-2026 academic year, NTS reported a total enrollment of 150 students—64 MDiv students, 22 MA students, and 62 DMin students. NTS enrollment has declined in the last six years, particularly in the master's programs. In the 2019-2020 school year, NTS reported 118 MDiv students, 50 MA students, and 52 DMin students, for a total of 220 students.

== History ==
The Church of the Nazarene, founded in 1908, has since its beginning stressed the importance of education. It started and developed a number of denominational colleges to meet the demand of its constituents for college training, and for some time it relied on the religion departments of its colleges as the principal means for training students preparing for ministry. However, during the quadrennium of 1940-44, sentiment favoring the establishment of a central theological school grew rapidly and finally crystallized in an action of the Annual Conference of the District Superintendents held in Kansas City, January 5–6, 1944. The conference recommended that the Board of General Superintendents appoint a Seminary Commission to study the need for such an institution. On January 10, 1944, the Board of General Superintendents appointed the commission: Russell V. DeLong, chairman, M. Lunn, secretary; E.O. Chalfant; M. Kimber Moulton, and Harlan Heinmiller.

The commission reported its findings to the Eleventh General Assembly of the Church of the Nazarene held in Minneapolis in June 1944. This assembly authorized the establishment of the seminary as a graduation institution of the Church of the Nazarene. The first Seminary Board of Trustees was then elected and the name Nazarene Theological Seminary was chosen. The Board of Trustees unanimously selected Kansas City as the Seminary's location.

At a special meeting in Kansas City, September 1944, the board of trustees unanimously elected Hugh C. Benner as the seminary's first president. The following year, the board of trustees elected the following full-time faculty: Russell V. DeLong, district superintendent of the Northwest Indiana District, as dean and Professor of Philosophy of Religion; Ralph Earle, Eastern Nazarene College professor, as Professor of Greek and Bible; L. A. Reed, pastor of Chicago First Church of the Nazarene, as Professor of Preaching and Pastoral Ministry; Mendell Taylor, Bethany Nazarene College professor, as registrar and Professor of Church History; and Stephen S. White, Olivet Nazarene College professor, as Professor of Theology.

The seminary started its first school year in September 1945 in temporary quarters with 61 enrolled. The Nazarene Publishing House generously provided space for administrative offices and a classroom on the first floor of the General Editorial Building, 2901 Troost; and the management of the denominational headquarters building extended a similar courtesy in providing the seminary with its main classroom and chapel. The library was housed in the renovated coach house of the Headquarters property.

In January 1950, a 10 1/2-acre (4.2 ha) site was purchased at 1700 East Meyer Boulevard, Kansas City. An administration and classroom building was erected on this campus in 1954. A library building was added in 1966.

=== Presidents (1945-present) ===
- Hugh C. Benner, 1945–1952
- L.T. Corlett, 1952–1966
- Eugene Stowe, 1966–1968
- William M. Greathouse, 1968–1976
- Stephen W. Nease, 1976–1980
- Terrell C. Sanders, Jr., 1981–1992
- A. Gordon Wetmore, 1992–2000
- Ron Benefiel, 2000–2011
- David Busic, 2011–2013
- Carla Sunberg, 2014–2017
- Jeren Rowell, 2017–present

=== Deans of the Seminary/Deans of the Faculty (1946-present) ===
- Russell V. DeLong, Dean of the Seminary, 1946–1953
- Mendell Taylor, Dean of the Seminary, 1953–1971
- Willard H. Taylor, 1971–1981
- Chester O. Galloway, 1981–1988
- Albert L. Truesdale, 1988–1995
- Edwin H. Robinson, 1995–2003
- Roger L. Hahn, 2003–2017
- Joshua R. Sweeden, 2017–2022
- Sarah Coleson-Derck, 2022–Present

== Criticisms ==
NTS has received criticism from clergy and laity within the Nazarene denomination. This criticism has focused on the theologically progressive views of seminary professors and speakers. Critics have expressed concern for how NTS has employed LGBTQ-affirming professors and hosted LGBTQ-affirming speakers.

At the 2025 District Assembly for the MidSouth District Church of the Nazarene, a resolution was presented which urged the General Board and Board of General Superintendents "to ensure that no World Evangelism Fund resources are allocated to any Nazarene educational institution that knowingly retains theological or biblical professors who affirm same-sex sexual intimacy." The resolution specifically named NTS as an institution that had employed professors who affirmed same-sex sexual intimacy. Several former and current NTS professors were highlighted for their views in support of same-sex sexual intimacy, including Michael Christensen, Frank Thomas, Emmanuel Cleaver III, Eric Severson, and Steve McCormick. The resolution was referred to the District Advisory Board of the MidSouth District. General Superindent Scott Daniels said that the BGS had discussed the resolution and "takes this resolution very seriously and are trying to do our best to respond faithfully to the concerns that have been expressed." A similar resolution was also presented at the Kentucky District Assembly. The resolution was also referred to the district advisory board.

NTS President Dr. Jeren Rowell has also acknowledged the criticism the seminary has received. In response to that criticism, Rowell stated "The faculty at NTS (full-time, part-time, and contingent) are vetted and approved by votes of the faculty, the Board of Trustees, and approval of the Board of General Superintendents. It is not unusual for NTS to be criticized for including guest presenters in courses and events who may not be approved as full faculty. This is misplaced concern. Our mature students are not only fully capable of dialog across theological spectra, but they also expect the seminary program to provide these opportunities for guided exploration of the most difficult questions."

Despite Rowell's claims, critics have provided examples of LGBTQ-affirming professors who had official titles with the institution and were the professors of record for courses, in subsequent semesters to Rowell's comments.

== LGBTQ+ stances ==
NTS president Dr. Jeren Rowell, while affirming the Church of the Nazarene's position on matters of human sexuality, has stated that those who are advocating for full LGBTQ affirmation are "brothers and sisters in Christ". Rowell said he is "called to listen, dialog, and maintain fellowship with them".

In 2023, an NTS faculty member published an essay in support of LGBTQ affirmation in a book titled Why the Church of the Nazarene Should be Fully LGBTQ+ Affirming. Dr. Eric Severson was an affiliate faculty member when he wrote a chapter titled "The Queerness of the Holy".

Dr. Steve McCormick also wrote an essay in the book entitled "See No One as 'Other'". McCormick had been a long-time professor at NTS and the chair of theology. He taught at NTS for 18 years, retiring in 2022, one year before he wrote in Why the Church of the Nazarene Should be Fully LGBTQ+. McCormick has been open about his affirming position and indicated that he has held that position for years, including while as a faculty member at NTS. In 2025 McCormick had his ordination credential revoked by the Kansas City District leadership of the Church of the Nazarene in response to a letter of accusation filed against McCormick for his public statements in support of LGBTQ practice. McCormick remains the Emeritus Professor of Historical Theology | William M. Greathouse Chair for Wesleyan-Holiness Theology at NTS.

Dr. Michael Christensen, a visiting professor in the NTS Doctor of Ministry program, is teaching a course in the spring 2025 semester. Christensen has been public about his affirming stance since at least 2016. According to Christensen, he has "advocated for full inclusion of gay and lesbian sisters and brothers in the life of church since I was in college over 40 years ago".

== Governance ==
Nazarene Theological Seminary is governed by a board of trustees whose makeup is determined by the International Board of Education (IBOE) of the Church of the Nazarene. Church rules require a majority of the board's members to be "in full accord with the Articles of Faith, the doctrine of entire sanctification, and the covenants of the Church of the Nazarene as set forth in the latest version of the Manual." They also require at least 75% of the members to be active members of the Church of the Nazarene not under discipline and that the board have an equal number of clergy and laity if possible.

In the event that NTS (or any institution in the Church of the Nazarene) is determined to be out of compliance with the standards as stated in the Manual, the International Board of Education is required to report this to the jurisdictional General Superintendent and the Global Education and Clergy Development director.

All educational institutions within the Church of the Nazarene are also required to "seek to provide a curriculum, quality of instruction, and evidence of scholastic achievement that will adequately prepare graduates to function effectively in vocations and professions such graduates may choose."

== Funding ==
According to the office of the Church of the Nazarene general treasurer, NTS received more than $1 million in 2024 from the denomination. Money received by the school is allocated from the World Evangelism Fund, to which every local Nazarene church is expected to contribute 5.5% of its annual income and is disbursed to multiple missional programs of the denomination.

According to the 2025-2026 data tables from the Association of Theological Schools, NTS has a budget of $4.8 million. In addition, NTS reported $14.1 million in long-term investments.

In June 2025, General Superindent Scott Daniels said, "It's our goal that at the next General Assembly that [Nazarene Bible College and Nazarene Theological Seminary] would be self-sustaining without WEF funding."

== See also ==
- Nazarene International Education Association
- List of Church of the Nazarene schools
