= Nazarene International Education Association =

Educational institution

The Nazarene International Education Association (NIEA) is now called Nazarene Educators Worldwide (NEW) and is a part of the Church of the Nazarene. The Church of the Nazarene owns and operates 11 liberal arts institutions in Africa, Canada, Korea, and the United States, as well as 3 graduate seminaries, 37 undergraduate Bible/theological colleges, 3 nurses training colleges, 1 junior college, and 1 education college worldwide. At least in terms of the American institutions, the Church of the Nazarene seems to have changed its original official philosophy of abandoning academies, bible colleges, and universities to focus on liberal arts colleges, as 7 of the 8 "liberal arts colleges" call themselves universities, and there is now a bible college in Colorado Springs. The early-twentieth-century philosophy, as expressed by J.B. Chapman:

It was originally the plan to call every school we started a “university” ... It was our ultimate aim to have universities and our schools were named according to our vision of future developments. But I am, personally, convinced that we should definitely abandon the idea of building any universities, that we should drop these names from our schools... [Moreover,] it is my conclusion that we ... cannot permanently maintain academies and they do not meet our need, that a special Bible school does not meet our needs and that we should express ourselves on this conviction.... That the College, with the necessary fitting school and Bible department[,] is the school that we need and will build."

== History ==
The Nazarene International Education Association (NIEA) was born out of the concern of Nazarene educators for a support network to strengthen their educational ministries. The Association of Nazarene Christian Schools (ANCS) was the first grass roots response to this need.

In 1980, the General Assembly placed responsibility for Christian Schools in Children's Ministries. In a 1982 report to ANCS, Miriam Hall, director of Children's Ministries, proposed a denominationally-sponsored organization. ANCS voluntarily disbanded in favor of the new organization. After two years of planning, the Christian School Steering Committee adopted the concept and name of NIEA on April 17, 1984.

In June 1984, the new NIEA Executive Council proposed a Constitution and Bylaws. In February 1985, the General Board of the Church of the Nazarene approved the documents paving the way for ratification by NIEA membership.

== Organization and membership ==
The members and organization of NIEA consists of the grassroots educators, schools, and churches.

Membership is open to all educators associated with the Church of the Nazarene, whether by actual membership, employment, or regular attendance, and others interested in supporting the purposes of this organization.

Organization consists of the Executive Committee and Regional Chairs/Representatives, The Office of Christian Schools, nine current Educational Regions (associated with the Nazarene Churches Institutions of Higher Learning) and the individual members and schools or childcare centers.

NIEA Executive Committee: General Chair; Vice-Chair, Early Childhood; Vice-Chair, Elementary Education; Vice-Chair, Secondary Education; Director of Children's Ministries; Coordinator of Christian Schools; Assistant Coordinator of Christian Schools; Regional Chairs.

== Educational Regions ==
The NIEA Educational Regions are Nazarene college regions. The United States, for example, is divided into eight educational regions, each linked with one of the eight liberal arts colleges. A gentlemen's agreement exists between the liberal arts colleges, which stipulates that they are not to actively recruit outside their respective regions.

- Eastern USA Region for Eastern Nazarene College (ENC) in Quincy, Massachusetts
- North Central USA Region for MidAmerica Nazarene University (MNU) in Olathe, Kansas
- East Central USA Region for Mount Vernon Nazarene University (MVNU) in Mount Vernon, Ohio
- Northwest USA Region for Northwest Nazarene University (NNU) in Nampa, Idaho
- Central USA Region for Olivet Nazarene University (ONU) in Bourbonnais, Illinois
- Southwest USA Region for Point Loma Nazarene University (PLNU) in San Diego, California
- South Central USA Region for Southern Nazarene University (SNU) in Bethany, Oklahoma
- Southeast USA Region for Trevecca Nazarene University (TNU) in Nashville, Tennessee

== Affiliations ==
Over the years, NIEA has developed strategic relationships with other Christian Schools associations that have helped the development of Christian schooling within the Nazarene church. One such relationship is with The Association of Christian Schools International (ACSI). The standards for certification with ACSI have been meet through Nazarene Bible College (NBC).

== See also ==
- List of Church of the Nazarene schools
