= History of the Church of the Nazarene =

The history of the Church of the Nazarene has been divided into seven overlapping periods by the staff of the Nazarene archives in Lenexa, Kansas: (1) Parent Denominations (1887–1907); (2) Consolidation (1896–1915); (3) Search for Solid Foundations (1911–1928); (4) Persistence Amid Adversity (1928–1945); (5) Mid-Century Crusade for Souls (1945–1960); (6) Toward the Post-War Evangelical Mainstream (1960–1980); and (7) Internationalization (1976-2003).

== History ==
The Church of the Nazarene is the product of a series of mergers that occurred between various holiness churches, associations and denominations throughout the 20th century. The most prominent of these mergers took place at the First and Second General Assemblies, held at Chicago, Illinois, and Pilot Point, Texas in 1907 and 1908, respectively. The primary architect of these early mergers was C. W. Ruth.

=== Denominational name ===
The denomination inherited its current name from one of its primary antecedent groups, the Los Angeles based Church of the Nazarene founded in October 1895 by Dr. Phineas F. Bresee and Dr. Joseph Pomeroy Widney. The name of the denomination comes from the biblical description of Jesus Christ, who had been raised in the village of Nazareth, Israel (and was regarded consequently as "a Nazarene"). Jesus is called a Nazarene in Matthew 2:23, and in Acts 24:5, Paul's accuser Tertullus calls him "a ringleader of the sect of the Nazarenes". In the NASB Bible and a few other Bible versions, Jesus is also called a Nazarene in many parts of the New Testament, whereas most versions simply say "Jesus of Nazareth" in these verses.

Consequently, the denominational name focuses on Jesus as "The Nazarene". Additionally, the followers of Jesus were initially called "Nazarenes" (Acts 24:5), a term perhaps used by Jesus himself. According to Church of the Nazarene archivist Dr. Stan Ingersol:

The Hebrew name for "Jesus," derived from "Joshua," was common in first-century Palestinian Judaism, so "Jesus of Nazareth" specified which Jesus, and Acts references the early Palestinian Christians as followers "of the Nazarene" and "the sect of the Nazarenes." The term "Christian" developed outside Palestine, in Syria according to Acts, in conjunction with the mission to the Gentiles. It is derived from "Christos," a Greek translation of the Hebrew "messiah" or "anointed one." As Gentile Christianity spread through the Mediterranean basin, Jesus became known as Christ and references to "the Nazarene" diminished. Nineteenth and early 20th century European writers produced numerous biographies of Jesus, re-popularizing the term "Nazarene" and setting the stage for how the Church of the Nazarene received its name.

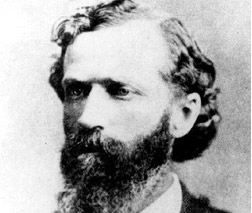
Dr. Joseph Pomeroy Widney

In 1895 the name of the denomination was first recommended by Dr. Joseph Pomeroy Widney, a former president of the University of Southern California and an influential figure in the early days of the Church of the Nazarene on the West Coast, where with Bresee, he was elected as a general superintendent for life. Ingersol indicates: "Other proposed names included various uses of 'Methodist'". Widney explained that the name had come to him one morning after spending the whole night in prayer. He said that the word "Nazarene" symbolized

the toiling, lowly mission of Christ. It was the name that Christ used of Himself, the name which was used in derision of Him by His enemies, the name which above all others linked Him to the great toiling, struggling, sorrowing heart of the world. It is Jesus, Jesus of Nazareth to whom the world in its misery and despair turns, that it may have hope

The denomination started as a church that ministered to the homeless and poor, and wanted to keep that attitude of ministering to "lower classes" of society.

At the First General Assembly that united Bresee's denomination with the Association of Pentecostal Churches of America in October 1907, the denominational name that emerged was the Pentecostal Church of the Nazarene, reflecting the ancestry of both denominational tributaries. A General Assembly was held in October 1908 in Pilot Point. During the assembly the church merged with the Holiness Church of Christ. October 1908 is seen as the natal month of the denomination, upheld the 1907 decision.

The term "Pentecostal" in the church's original name soon proved to be increasingly problematic. In the Wesleyan-holiness movement, the word was used widely as a synonym simply for "holiness". However, from the rise of 20th century Pentecostalism, especially after 1906, new meanings and associations attached themselves to the term – meanings that the Pentecostal Nazarenes rejected. Ingersol indicates: "[T]he word was increasingly understood in reference to charismatic gifts like speaking in tongues, which Nazarenes never practiced or approved." At the fifth General Assembly (held in Nashville in 1919), in response to resolutions from thirty-five district assemblies, the General Assembly voted to remove the word "Pentecostal" from the church name, leaving it simply as "Church of the Nazarene". Consequently, since 1919 "the denominational name has been identical to that of its western parent-body—a name that originated because J. P. Widney read 'lives of Jesus' books, and his imagination had been captured by a strong personal vision of 'the Nazarene'."

=== First General Assembly ===
Phineas Bresee sought to return to John Wesley's original goals of preaching the good news of the gospel to the poor and underprivileged.

The First General Assembly held in Chicago, Illinois from 10–17 October 1907 brought together the Eastern and the Western streams. The Western group was the Church of the Nazarene founded in October 1895 in Los Angeles, California by Dr. Phineas F. Bresee, a minister in the Methodist Episcopal Church, and Dr Joseph Pomeroy Widney, a Methodist physician, and the second president of the University of Southern California. The Eastern group was the Association of Pentecostal Churches of America, a denomination formed on 13 April 1897 through the merger of two older bodies: The Central Evangelical Holiness Association (organised 13–14 March 1890) and led by Fred A. Hillery and C. Howard Davis; and three churches organised by William Howard Hoople since January 1894, and formed into the Association of Pentecostal Churches of America. On 12 November 1896, these two groups met in Brooklyn, agreed upon a plan of union, which included retaining the name and Manual of Hoople's group. Prominent leaders included Hiram F. Reynolds, Davis, and Hoople. At the time of its merger with the Church of the Nazarene in 1907, the APCA existed principally from Nova Scotia to Iowa and the northeastern United States. The name of the united body adopted at the First General Assembly was Pentecostal Church of the Nazarene, and Bresee and Reynolds were elected the first general superintendents.

=== Interim accessions ===
In April 1908 Bresee accepted Edgar P. Ellyson, president of the Holiness University of Texas of Peniel, Texas, his wife, Mary Emily Ellyson (1869–1943), and many leaders and members of the Holiness Association of Texas into the Pentecostal Church of the Nazarene, with Emily Ellyson elected pastor of the new congregation at Peniel. In September 1908 the Pennsylvania Conference of the Holiness Christian Church under the leadership of Horace G. Trumbauer merged with the Pentecostal Church of the Nazarene.

=== Second General Assembly ===
At the Second General Assembly held at Pilot Point, Texas, the Holiness Church of Christ, located in the southern United States, merged with the Pentecostal Nazarenes. The Holiness Church of Christ itself was the merger of the New Testament Church of Christ founded in July 1894 at Milan, Tennessee by R.L. Harris, but soon led by his widow Mary Lee Cagle, and a group (also called the Holiness Church of Christ), that resulted in November 1904 at Rising Star, Texas from the prior merger of The Holiness Church' (founded in 1888 in Texas) and the Independent Holiness Church (formed at Van Alstyne, Texas in 1901, and led by Charles B. Jernigan and J.B. Chapman). The merger of the Holiness Church of Christ in the south and the Pentecostal Church of the Nazarene took place on Tuesday, October 13, 1908, at 10:40 a.m., "amid great shouts of joy and holy enthusiasm." The newly merged Church of the Nazarene began with 10,034 members, 228 congregations, 11 districts, and 19 missionaries, according to historical records. The latter date marks the "official" founding date. Bresee, Reynolds and Ellyson were elected general superintendents.

=== Later accessions ===
Other independent bodies joined at later dates, including the Pentecostal Church of Scotland (founded in 1909 by Rev. George Sharpe) and the Pentecostal Mission (founded in 1898 by J.O. McClurkan), both in 1915. At this point, the Church of the Nazarene now embraced seven previous denominations and significant parts of two other groups. In time, the Church of the Nazarene and the Wesleyan Church would emerge as the two major denominations to gather in the smaller bodies of the 19th century Wesleyan-holiness movement. In subsequent decades, there were new accessions and mergers. In the 1922, more than one thousand members and most of the workers led by Joseph G. Morrison, from the Laymen's Holiness Association (founded in 1917) located in the Dakotas, joined the Church of the Nazarene. In the 1950s, there were mergers with the Hephzibah Faith Missionary Association (founded in 1893 in Tabor, Iowa) in 1950; the International Holiness Mission (founded in London in 1907 by David Thomas) merged on 29 October 1952; the Calvary Holiness Church (founded in Britain 1934 by Maynard James and Jack Ford), united on 11 June 1955; and the Gospel Workers Church of Canada (founded in Ontario in 1918) became part of the Church of the Nazarene on 7 September 1958. On 3 April 1988, an indigenous Church of the Nazarene in Nigeria, established in the 1940s, merged with the denomination.

The 2009 General Assembly authorized a committee with "the responsibility to approach "like-minded churches in the Wesleyan-Holiness tradition in order to pursue closer relations, with a goal of exploring the possibility of a merger or a collaborative relationship."

=== Separations ===
==== People's Mission (1912) ====
Throughout its history, there have been several groups that separated from the Church of the Nazarene to form new denominations. One of the first groups to withdraw from the denomination consisted of seven congregations in Colorado that had comprised the People's Mission Church under the leadership of William Lee, which had united with the Church of the Nazarene in April 1911. However, on 6 January 1912, Lee and his preachers wrote to Bresee indicating their desire to withdraw as they had found the "distinctively congregational form of government" in the Church of the Nazarene was not suitable for a work so "pioneer and aggressive" in character as theirs had been." Despite efforts to address their concerns, "only a small band in Colorado Springs remained 'loyal to the church." In 1925 the People's Mission merged with the Pilgrim Holiness Church.

==== Pentecost Pilgrim Church (1917) ====
Seth Cook Rees (1854–1933), a Holiness Quaker evangelist, who had in March 1912 become a Nazarene when he became the founding pastor of the University Church at Pasadena, California, soon the third largest congregation in the infant denomination, left the Church of the Nazarene with most of the members of his congregation to form the Pentecost Pilgrim Church (later Pilgrim Church) on 26 May 1917. Most of the congregation in San Diego and its pastor, and the president of Bresee College in Kansas, united with Rees's denomination. In January 1918 "a small but influential group of Pilgrim sympathizers" in Nampa, Idaho seceded in January, 1918. In 1922 Rees led a group of 457 Pilgrims, which merged with the International Holiness Church to form the Pilgrim Holiness Church, with Rees elected as one of the three general superintendents in 1926. In 1968 the Pilgrim Holiness Church merged with the Wesleyan Methodist Church of North America to form the Wesleyan Church. The events surrounding the Rees Controversy resulted in the 1919 General Assembly of the Church of the Nazarene limiting the authority of individual district and general superintendents in disorganizing individual congregations.

==== Bible Missionary Church (1955) ====
A significant defection from the Church of the Nazarene was the organization of the Bible Missionary Union (BMU) in November 1955 with 126 members, after a five-week Holiness campaign conducted by Nazarene evangelist Glenn Griffith in Caldwell, Idaho in September. Griffith, a former district superintendent believed the denomination had grown "cold, anemic and formal", and had been guilty of compromising with the secular society by refusing to ban the use of television by church members at the 1952 General Assembly. After the 1956 General Assembly failed to ban television, others left the denomination, including Rev. William Tidwell; Rev. Spencer Johnson; Rev. W.L. King (12 October 1923 - 30 May 2009), who had started the "Voice of the Nazarene" radio program and periodical; and Elbert Dodd, superintendent of the Louisiana district, 26 ministers and seven hundred members of this district, resulting in the closure of fourteen churches. In 1956 members of the BMU and other disaffected Nazarenes met in Colorado for the first General Conference of the BMU, which was renamed the Bible Missionary Church (BMC). The BMC was more conservative and narrower than the Church of the Nazarene, by only allowing premillennialism; believer's baptism; and ordination by any ordained minister, rather than by a general superintendent. There were significant losses for the Church of the Nazarene, as by the end of 1956 "ministers and congregations from twenty states and three foreign missionary fields had associated themselves with the new movement." According to Purkiser, "the districts most affected by the secession were Louisiana, Colorado, Idaho-Oregon, Indianapolis, Southwest Indiana, Southwest Oklahoma, East Tennessee, and South Carolina. While other factors may have been involved, three of the affected districts registered membership losses during the crucial two years: Louisiana, 825; Southwest Oklahoma, 366; and East Tennessee, 193." Differences within the Bible Missionary Church resulted in Griffith leaving to form the Wesleyan Holiness Association of Churches near Muncie, Indiana on 4 August 1959 over the issue of divorce, and King forming the Nazarene Baptist Church in 1960, which was renamed the Nazarene Bible Church by 1967, and affiliated with his Voice of the Nazarene Association of Churches. By 1967 the BMC had churches in 34 US states, Canada, Mexico, Papua New Guinea, and five other nations, and about 3,000 members in the United States.

==== Holiness Church of the Nazarene (1961–1968) ====
In 1958 Rev. Joseph Staten Pitts (born 14 June 1907 in Birmingham, Alabama; died 19 April 2006 in Marion, Indiana), a former United States Army chaplain who had been awarded the Philippine Liberation Medal, and the pioneer Nazarene missionary to the Philippines, and Marciano Encarnacion, a Filipino layman, who had begun the Church of the Nazarene in the Philippines at Cabanatuan in May 1946, and most of the pastors and members left the Church of the Nazarene over concerns the denomination was too accommodating to the world (especially in relation to allowing women to "bob" their hair), and desires for more autonomy for local leaders. In 1957 Pitts was recalled from the Philippines by the General Board of the Church of the Nazarene, and after a meeting with the Board of General Superintendents on 31 August 1957, his missionary contract was terminated. In 1961 Pitts returned to the Philippines as an independent missionary, funded largely by the First Church of the Nazarene in Lake Charles, Louisiana, where his brother, Paul Ernest Pitts (born 6 May 1904 in Haleyville, Alabama; died November 1969 in Lake Charles, Louisiana), a former superintendent of the Alabama District (1938–1942), was the pastor. Joseph Pitts was subsequently dropped from the roll of elders of the Church of the Nazarene, and in December 1961 Pitts incorporated the Holiness Church of the Nazarene, with himself as chairman and Encarnacion as vice-chairman. After his retirement from the Philippines in 1968, Pitts turned his denomination over to the Church of the Bible Covenant.

==== Church of the Bible Covenant (1967) ====
The Church of the Bible Covenant was organized on March 10, 1967 at the John T. Hatfield Campground near Cleveland, Indiana by Nazarene ministers Remiss R. Rehfeldt (born 28 February 1915; died 8 March 1992), district superintendent of the Indiana district, who had been the Executive Secretary of the Foreign Missionary Department from 1948–1960, along with Marvin Powers, nephew of general superintendent Hardy Powers along with departing pastors and members of the Pilgrim Holiness and Wesleyan Methodist denominations. Rehfeldt and Powers were both elected general presiding officers. At its peak in 1984 the CBC had 165 churches (including 75 outside the United States), however congenital disagreements about remarriage after divorce, and personal adornment, and ultimately the inability of choose a general presiding officer, resulted in its dissolution from 1985 to 1988.

==== Crusaders Churches of the United States of America (1972) ====
After the Church of the Nazarene decided at the 1972 General Assembly in Miami, Florida to allow those who had remarried after divorce to be church members, Rev. E.O. Jack Jones, who had spoken against the resolution at the General Assembly and subsequently surrendered his ministerial credentials, and his supporters established the Crusaders Churches of the United States of America later in 1972, with its headquarters in Urbana, Illinois, and Faith in the Future as its official periodical.

==== Fellowship of Charismatic Nazarenes (1977) ====
"One of the most divisive issues in the Church of the Nazarene in the 1960s and 1970s was speaking in tongues." The Church of the Nazarene's historic prohibition on glossolalia was challenged increasingly by Nazarenes influenced by the Charismatic Movement that originated in the United States in the 1960s. At the 1972 General Assembly each delegate received a packet of materials advocating a charismatic revival in the denomination and for an acceptance of tongues-speaking members. When Charismatic Nazarenes failed to have the denomination relax its position at both the 1972 and 1976 General Assemblies, and in light of "strongly worded" statements by the Board of General Superintendents in 1976, the Fellowship of Charismatic Nazarenes was formed in Kansas City in 1977, with Warren Black (born 27 November 1927 in Bethany, Oklahoma), a former accountant at the Nazarene Publishing House, who had been "ousted from his Church of the Nazarene pulpit", chosen to be its inaugural leader. Black indicated in a 1977 interview that he knew of fifty Nazarene ministers "who had been put out because of receiving the gift of the Holy Spirit. The church takes a very intolerant position about it". In 1985, the Wesleyan Holiness Charismatic Fellowship was formed with Wilbur L. Jackson, a former Nazarene pastor from Cincinnati, Ohio its initial leader. Both groups work co-operatively.

==== Gold Creek Community Church (2012) ====
Gold Creek Community Church was a large congregation in the Church of the Nazarene that left the denomination to be an independent non-denominational church in 2012. Its ministers were removed from the role of ministers by the action of the Washington Pacific District Assembly on April 15, 2012. The church had 2,428 members when it separated from the denomination.

=== International growth ===
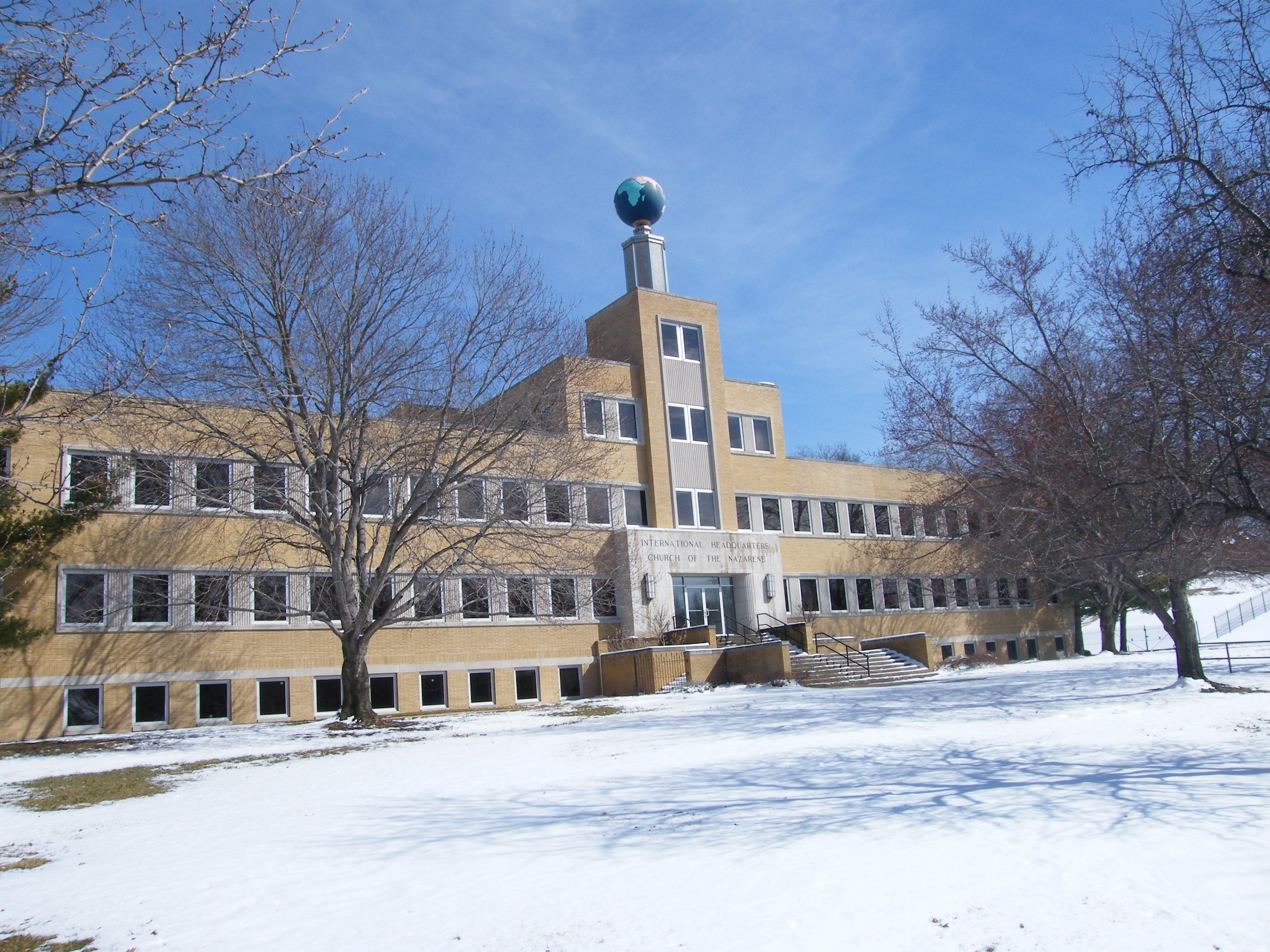
Former International Headquarters of the Church of the Nazarene, Kansas City

Even before the merger of October 1908, the parental bodies of the Church of the Nazarene had a vision to be an international denomination. International expansion began in India in 1898 by missionaries sponsored by the Association of Pentecostal Churches of America. By 1908, there were churches in Canada and organized work in India, Swaziland, Cape Verde, and Japan, soon followed by work in central Africa, Mexico, and China. The 1915 mergers added congregations in the British Isles and work in Cuba, Central America, and South America. There were congregations in Syria and Palestine by 1922. General Superintendent Reynolds advocated "a mission to the world," and support for world evangelization became a distinguishing characteristic of Nazarene life. Taking advantage of new technologies, the church began producing the Showers of Blessing radio program in the 1940s, followed by the Spanish broadcast La Hora Nazarena and later by broadcasts in other languages. From the 1940s through the 1980s, indigenous holiness churches in other countries continued to join the church.

At the time of the 50th anniversary of the denomination in October 1958, a total of 19.8% of all Nazarenes lived outside the continental United States. In 1981 the figure was 28.3%. In late 1991 there were one million members of the denomination globally, with 43% living outside the United States. By 2000 the church's membership was just under 1.4 million, with the church's membership outside the United States doubling in the previous decade, and now comprising 53% of total global church membership. In June 2009, 64 percent of Nazarene members and 80 percent of the church's 429 districts are outside the United States. More than 20% Nazarenes are from Africa, and more than 20% Nazarenes speak Spanish as their first language.

In 2009, the church is located in 155 "world areas" (approximately equivalent to nations). At the 2009 annual meeting of the General Board, it was decided that the denomination would enter the following new nations: Guinea-Conakry (Africa Region), Niger (Africa Region); Moldova (Eurasia Region), and Norway (Eurasia Region). Each week Nazarenes worship in more than 212 languages or tribal languages, with literature produced in 90 of these. The Church of the Nazarene reaches out to persons around the globe through the Internet, radio broadcasts in 33 languages, and video and printed materials in 95 languages. In 2008, there were 794 General Board-funded missionaries (active, retired, regional, Mission Corps volunteers, and "tentmakers") for the Church of the Nazarene. These missionaries originate from 26 world areas. In 2008, 508 Mission Corps (formerly Nazarenes in Volunteer Service) volunteers, including 23 "tentmakers," ministered in 51 world areas.

== Internationalization ==
=== Developments (1907–1932) ===
The primary architect of Nazarene mission philosophy and practice was Hiram F. Reynolds, who had served as the foreign missionary superintendent in the Association of Pentecostal Churches of America (APCA) from its earliest years, and held a similar role in the Church of the Nazarene (under various titles) from 1907 until 1922. Influenced by the indigenous church mission theories of Anglican Henry Venn (1796–1873) and American Board of Commissioners for Foreign Missions secretary Rufus Anderson (1796–1880), from the beginning of the global expansion of the Church of the Nazarene (including its antecedent groups), there was a commitment to the development of indigenous churches and districts within the framework of a unitary global denomination under the authority of the Manual. As early as 3 March 1914, Nazarene mission policy developed for the work in Japan by Reynolds encouraged the creation of "self-supporting and self-governing churches":

When a Mission Church reaches a place where it can become entirely self supporting it shall be organized by the District Missionary Superintendent (SIC) Into a self supporting body according to the manual of the Pentecostal Church of the Nazarene adapted to the needs peculiar to the country, and shall be governed by the same. The church shall be granted a pastor whose duties and privileges (SIC) shall conform to the manual; and at this time all missionary control shall be relinquished except such superintendency as provided for in the manual.

Under the policy, foreign districts would be granted the same rights as United States districts, with control passing from missionaries to local leaders. However, in 1919, all reference to the missionaries relinquishing control was removed, and the following substituted: "The pastor and delegates from the self-supporting church to the District Assembly must be able to enter into the deliberations of the Assembly in the English language until such time as a self-supporting district may be formed."

=== Developments (1932–1964) ===
Gailey indicates, that by 1932 these policy statements had been broadened to full "three-self" language, with the instruction to missionaries to cultivate among local Christians "...self support, self leadership and responsibility for the propagation of the gospel in that field." The "language was unchanged for the next twenty years, and has remained essentially intact until the present time." By the 1930s, Nazarene missions leaders "did not aim toward the development of autonomous national churches, but a federation of districts. They did not plan for indefinite missionary control. Without a great deal of thought about where this would lead, without consciously copying any other denomination's model of church government, and without much theological reflection, the Church of the Nazarene became an international body." The first non-missionary district superintendents were George Sharpe (born in Scotland in 1865; died 1948) in Britain (November 1915) and Vicente G. Santin (1870–1948), appointed district superintendent in Mexico in 1919. In January 1936 the General Board divided the declared the Japan District into two, and the Western or Kwansai district became the first regular district in the denomination, "with all the rights and privileges of any of the North American and British Isles districts subject to the Manual and the General Assembly," however the effects of World War II on the church in Japan saw it revert to a missionary-led district.

=== Developments (1964–1980) ===
According to one denominational historian, W.T. Purkiser, the process of "internationalizing" the church began at the General Assembly in Portland, Oregon in 1964 with an eight-year study of the church's total missionary program." Soon after that General Assembly, E.S. Phillips was elected Executive Secretary for World Missions, who encouraged the self-study. In this period, a think tank comprising R. Franklin Cook, a former missionary to India and member of the World Mission department since 1961; missiologist Paul Orjala, pioneer missionary to Haiti; and Honorato Reza, long-time representative for the Hispanic church, was formed to advise Phillips. They were responsible for developing the denomination's first "National Church Policy" that was adopted in 1966, and indicated explicitly for the first time the steps towards achieving "regular" district status. At the General Assembly of 1972, held at Miami Beach, Florida, Phillips, influenced by the recommendations of the preceding self-study, recommended in his report that "The administrative bodies of the church must be internationalized....That portion of the church that lives overseas...must be given full voice in the councils of the church." Phillips advocated contextualization of the gospel and internationalization of denominational programs and structures. It was only in 1972 that the General Secretary began to include overseas membership in reporting totals, as prior to this time it had been difficult to collect the needed data.

In 1973 Phillips died, and was succeeded by former missionary to Germany Jerald Johnson (born 1916). In 1974 the Guatemala Northeast district achieved regular status, the first since Japan achieved this milestone in 1936 Also in 1974 the Nazarene Young Peoples Society (now Nazarene Youth International) in its desire to be more inclusive, held its first International Institute (now Nazarene World Youth Conference) on the campus of European Nazarene Bible College in Büsingen, Germany. At the 1976 General Assembly held in Dallas, Texas, a Commission on Internationalization was created to recommend "means by which the next stage of internationalization might be implemented." In 1976, concrete steps were taken to make possible an international church with the creation of three intercontinental zones outside the United States and Canada: Intercontinental Zone I (Europe, the Middle East and Africa); Intercontinental Zone II (the Orient and South Pacific); and Intercontinental Zone III (Central and South America). In 1977 the General Board had eight members (18%) from outside the United States among its 44 members. In 1978 the first international district superintendents' conference was held in Kansas City, Missouri, with 52 leaders from 35 nations represented.

At the 1980 General Assembly, held in Kansas City, the denomination formally committed itself to the process of internationalization, a deliberate policy of being one church of congregations and districts worldwide, rather than splitting into national churches like earlier Protestant denominations. The principle was set forth of “one church, one doctrine, one polity, and one policy.” At that time, the entire denomination was divided into fifteen geographical regions, with eight in the United States based around its regional college; one in Canada; and the three Intercontinental Zones subdivided into six regions: Africa; Asia; Europe and Middle East; Mexico, Central America, and Caribbean; South America; and the South Pacific. The General Board now included members from outside the United States, Canada and the other parts of the British Commonwealth. In 1980 the General Board had fourteen (27%) out of its 51 members residing outside the United States and Canada.

=== Developments after 1980 ===
After the election of Jerald Johnson as a general superintendent in June 1980, the General Board elected L. Guy Nees as his replacement. During his six years of leadership, Nees appointed directors for each of the six missions regions, who supervised the establishment of administrative offices in each region. The 2nd Commission on Internationalization recommended that regional directors should be born in the region. The 1985 General Assembly allowed "cultural adaptations of local, district, and regional church government procedures", approved the creation of regional advisory councils and conferences, and national administrative boards. In 1989 the 3rd Commission recommended that the Church of the Nazarene should be a "denomination of districts (not nations)", and that districts and regions should follow geographical rather than racial or ethnic lines. The 1989 General Assembly stated three principles for internationalization: "(1) shared mission; (2) national identity; and (3) indigenization"; prohibited districts being constituted on the basis of ethnicity; explicitly rejected the idea of a commonwealth or federation of the denomination, in favour of it being a "global family"; and created a Commission on the International Church.

In 1999 incoming professor of missions at Nazarene Theological Seminary Mario Zani indicated that the biblical concept of koinonia, the fellowship "that transcended any differences, assignments, or titles", should be the basis of the development of the Church of the Nazarene. Zani critiqued the idea of internationalization as being too predetermined and focused on strategies and administrative policies, whereas he advocated the denominational goal should be globalization, which he defined as "that process by which we become sensitized and responsive to the multi-cultural, multi-lingual, multi-ethnic, and multi-national world of which we are a part." Zani concluded that though the Church of the Nazarene was "international from its conception, it was not truly global."

By the 2001 General Assembly, held in Indianapolis, 42 percent of delegates present and voting were not native English speakers. Today 64 percent of Nazarene members and 80 percent of the church's 429 districts are outside the United States. However, General Secretary David Wilson reported that at the 2009 General Assembly that 562 delegates present and registered were from the United States and Canada (55 percent) and 461 delegates were from other world regions (45 percent). As many elected delegates from outside the United States could not attend the General Assembly due to financial, United States immigration policies or other reasons, the General Assembly authorised the creation of "a committee to address the concern that a high percentage (as many as 40 percent in some world regions) of non-North American/non-United States delegates are unable to attend a General Assembly". Since the Church of the Nazarene's quadrennial General Assembly is based on representation from districts from 151 world areas, the 2009 General Assembly was probably one of the most racially and linguistically diverse general meetings of any religious body that originated on American soil. At the 2009 General Assembly the delegates voted to create a global Manual that would be streamlined in comparison to recent Manuals, consist of the Foreword, and Parts I, II, and III of the current Manual, and would also include parts of the Manual that are global in scope, retaining the universally appropriate polity and principles." The General Assembly authorised the different regions to adapt the Manual to fit specific cultural contexts and would function as a "regional Manual policy handbook."

For the quadrennium starting July 2009, the General Board currently had 44 members representing the church's 15 regions, and an additional four members were elected to represent Education (2), Nazarene Youth International, and Nazarene Missions International. Of the 48 members elected, 27 (56%) are from outside the United States, and 21 are United States citizens. Five are women.
