= Dorothy Davis Cook =

American missionary registered nurse

Dorothy Davis Cook (March 29, 1912 – June 28, 2005) was an American missionary registered nurse with the Church of the Nazarene who served in Swaziland (now Eswatini from 1940 to 1972. Cook built the nurse aide program and established the first state-registered nurse program in Swaziland. She was given the nickname “Mother of Swazi Nurses” for the education she provided to several hundred Swazi Christian nurses.

== Early life ==
Dorothy Fay Davis Cook was born on March 29, 1912, in Hugo, Colorado, as the daughter of Mr. and Mrs. Hurshel Davis. She came from a family with roots in Wales. Her paternal grandparents were farmers in Iowa, while her maternal grandparents were the owners of the M.M. Smith General Merchandise store in Royah, Colorado. The Davis grandparents were Quakers and relocated, along with their children and eventually grandchildren, including Dorothy, to a Quaker village in Whittier, California.

Cook grew up in a Christian home, and she spent the majority of her childhood in Alhambra, California. At the age of 14, the Alhambra Church of the Nazarene became the church her family belonged to. She attended Alhambra High School. and in 1930, attended the first Nazarene institution for higher education, Pasadena College (now called Point Loma Nazarene University), earning a Bachelor of Arts degree in 1934 with a major in education and a minor in religion. She continued her education at the Nazarene Samaritan Hospital in Nampa, Idaho. The Samaritan Hospital was established in 1920 and closed in 1954, graduating a total of 236 nurses. Cook became a licensed registered nurse by the State of Idaho on 16 November 1938.

== Career ==
Cook was appointed to the Nazarene missionary service on November 22, 1939. She arrived in Africa on June 4, 1940, and spent her first year in the north of Swaziland in Endzingini. She moved to the Raleigh Fitkin Memorial Hospital and Nazarene Nursing School in Bremersdorp to take the position of leader of the Swazi nursing program as Principal Tutor. Cook mentored Eva (Manzini) Mthethwa, the first Swazi nurse to pass the Eswatini Nursing Council’s examination and be fully registered. Together, the two helped to create the Nursing Procedure Manual, which was used by all nurses trained in Eswatini after 1946. In 1945, Davis completed all requirements in Zulu study, the native language of the people. In 1946, she became a certified nurse midwife, which left her with the task of delivering high-risk patients both in homes and in the hospital. After this certification, she completed her sister training in London, England, in order to become the principal of the Nazarene Nursing School. She was also ordained as an elder in the Church of the Nazarene and held daily services in the hospital and in the nursing school.

Davis worked closely with David Hynd, who established the first hospital in the country, Raleigh Fitkin Memorial Hospital. She contracted malaria and was treated by Hynd with intravenous quinine. Cook left Swaziland in 1972. She served on the High Commission Territories Nursing Council, the British governing body for Swaziland

Cook returned to Southern California and worked as a hospital supervisor and lived at the Nazarene missionary retirement center. She met a retired missionary, Ralph Cook, and married him in 1984.

=== Writing ===
In 1965, Cook co-authored the Swaziland Nurse and Midwifery Act She started the Swaziland Nursing Journal and the publication of the 1971 issue was devoted to the work she was doing. She was also first editor of the Nazarene Nursing News

Cook published the book: Nursing in Swaziland in 1975, and wrote four nursing texts.

== Awards ==
Davis was honored with the Member of the Member of the British Empire award for her service in Swaziland. She also received the Church of the Nazarene Distinguished Service Award

== Death and legacy ==
Cook died on June 28, 2005.

The Dorothy Fay Davis Silver Medal was established annually in Swaziland to recognise a nursing student's efforts.

== Sources ==
- Elliott, Susan (14 April 2000). Missionary Nurse Dorothy Davis Cook, 1940–1972: 'Mother of Swazi Nurses' (Thesis). doi:10.22371/07.2000.001. hdl:10755/20002. OCLC 1322096634. ProQuest 304681462.
