= Nyuk (disambiguation) =

Nyuk may refer to:

- Lake Nyuk, a large freshwater lake in the Republic of Karelia
- Nazarene Youth United Kingdom, a United Kingdom youth organization of the Church of the Nazarene
- "Nyuk-nyuk-nyuk", an onomatopoetic rendering of the trademark laugh of Curly Howard of the Three Stooges
