= Carla Sunberg =

American minister (born 1961)

43rd General Superintendent Church of the Nazarene
- Incumbent
- Assumed office July 26, 2017

Personal details
- Born: Carla Dawn Johnson; July 1, 1961 (age 65) Bad Homburg, West Germany
- Spouse: Chuck Sunberg
- Children: 2
- Education: MidAmerica Nazarene University; Nazarene Theological Seminary; Nazarene Theological College (England); University of Manchester
- Profession: Educator; Missionary; Academic; Administrator

Carla Dawn Sunberg (née Johnson; born July 1, 1961) is an American ordained minister in the Church of the Nazarene, administrator, academic, author, speaker and former missionary and registered nurse, who is the 2nd woman elected as a General Superintendent in the Church of the Nazarene, and was the first woman and the 10th person elected as president of Nazarene Theological Seminary. At the time of her election on January 3, 2014, Sunberg was co-District Superintendent (with her husband Charles H. "Chuck" Sunberg) of the East Ohio District of the Church of the Nazarene, having served in this role since November 1, 2011. Dr Sunberg was elected the 43rd General Superintendent in the Church of the Nazarene on the 11th ballot by the delegates of the 29th General Assembly of the Church of the Nazarene on June 27, 2017. Sunberg is the only daughter of Jerald Johnson, the 24th General Superintendent of the Church of the Nazarene.

For almost four years, Sunberg was the President of the Wesleyan-Holiness Women Clergy International organization from May 2009 to April 2013. Sunberg also served as the inaugural chairman of the USA/Canada Nazarene Women Clergy Council from February 2007 to June 2009. From 1992 to 2005, Sunberg was a global missionary for the Church of the Nazarene in the Commonwealth of Independent States.

== Early life and education ==
Carla Dawn Johnson was born on July 1, 1961, in Bad Homburg, West Germany, as the fourth child and only daughter of Rev. Jerald DeWight Johnson (born in Curtis, Nebraska, in 1927) and his wife Alice Eva Schmidt (born August 10, 1923, in Beiseker, Alberta, Canada), a Canadian of German parentage, who had been pioneer missionaries for the Church of the Nazarene in West Germany from March 1958 to May 1969. Sunberg is the younger sister of the late Jerald DeWight Johnson Jr. (born September 21, 1953, in Spokane, Washington; died March 10, 2009, in Idaho), who was adopted when five days old by Johnson and his wife; Dennis Lane Johnson (born September 17, 1954, in Coeur d’Alene, Idaho); and Kurt Eugene Johnson (born October 20, 1959, in Frankfurt, West Germany).

By May 1969, the Johnson family left West Germany and relocated to the US. On May 18, 1969, Sunberg's father became the pastor of the Cambrian Park Church of the Nazarene in San Jose, California. In 1970 the Johnson family relocated to Nampa, Idaho, where Jerald Johnson became pastor of College Church of the Nazarene. Upon Johnson's election as Director of the World Mission Division of the Church of the Nazarene in 1973, Sunberg and her family relocated to Overland Park, Kansas. Sunberg attended Shawnee Mission South High School, and graduated in 1979.

From 1979 Sunberg attended MidAmerica Nazarene University in Olathe, Kansas, where she graduated with a Bachelor of Science in Nursing (BSN) cum laude degree in 1983.

== Career ==
=== Registered nurse ===
After graduation from MidAmerica Nazarene University in May 1983, Sunberg became a registered nurse and worked in Kansas, Missouri, and Texas. For three years from 1983, Sunberg worked as a nurse in St Louis, Missouri, while her husband Chuck was associate pastor of the Southwest Church of the Nazarene.

In 1986 Chuck accepted a call to serve as the senior pastor of the First Church of the Nazarene in Austin, Texas, while Carla Sunberg continued nursing in the Austin area until 1992. While living in Austin, Sunberg became the mother of two daughters.

=== Church of the Nazarene ===
==== Missionary to Russia (1992–2005) ====
From July 1992 to 2005, Sunberg and her husband Charles and their two daughters lived in Moscow, where they were pioneer missionaries for the Church of the Nazarene in the former Soviet Union, that resulted in the establishment of the Church of the Nazarene in the Commonwealth of Independent States (CIS). Their responsibilities involved giving leadership to more than 60 ministries, including leading Russian Nazarenes in starting churches, compassionate ministry centers, and clergy education centers. In this period, her husband was field director from 1993 to 2005, while Sunberg served initially as Director of Compassionate Ministries (1992–2002) and later as the Director of Theological Education (2002–2005) for the Church of the Nazarene on the CIS Field. When the Sunbergs left Russia in 2005, the CIS Field had 50 churches on four districts in 6 nations.

===== Director of NAZCOM (Compassionate Ministries) (1992–2002) =====
In her capacity as Director of Nazarene Compassionate Ministries in the CIS Field, Sunberg used her training and experience as a registered nurse. Under the auspices of NAZCOM, a Nazarene humanitarian aid organization working in Russia, by 1996 Sunberg and other nurses from American Nazarene colleges developed a four-module program for continuing education for medical personnel. Sunberg and these guest lecturers taught two-week nursing education modules in Russia, Ukraine, and Kazakhstan. NAZCOM also worked with Heart to Heart, a Kansas-based Christian organization founded by Nazarene doctor Gary Morsch, helping this group distribute millions of dollars' worth of medication throughout the former Soviet Union.

Sunberg also developed a preventive dental care program for children. She has arranged for visiting dentists to conduct training and demonstrations for Russian dentists on protective sealants for teeth. Sunberg also gave presentations in public schools on dental hygiene, and distributed toothbrushes, toothpaste, and dental floss, donated by children in America to the students. Additionally, Sunberg trained others in her church to conduct dental hygiene presentations in schools. With the aid of several other American nurses, Sunberg also helped the Nazarene Ministry Center to launch a stop-smoking program.

===== Director of Theological Education (2002–2005) =====
In 2002 Sunberg was appointed as the director for theological education for the CIS field, and was responsible for establishing a system of ministerial education and training for 250 students in the former Soviet Union. By 2013 the CIS Nazarene Education Centers were offering the following academic programs: Certificate in Christian Service, Certificate in Spiritual Formation, Diploma in Bible and Theology, and Diploma in Bible and Mission, through its affiliation with European Nazarene College in Busingen, Germany. As Director of Theological Education for the CIS, Sunberg was also a member of the Eurasia Region of the Church of the Nazarene's regional course of study committee and the education council.

While still living in Moscow, in 1999 Sunberg enrolled part-time at Nazarene Theological Seminary), and travelled there twice a year with 7 Russian students to attend classes. In 2004 Sunberg graduated cum laude with a Master of Arts degree in theological studies.

Sunberg was ordained as an elder in the Church of the Nazarene in Moscow in 2004 on the Russia North District.

==== Pastoral ministry (2005–2011) ====
From June 2005 to October 2011, the Sunbergs co-pastored Grace Point Church of the Nazarene in Fort Wayne, Indiana, where Chuck served as senior pastor, and Carla as evangelism and discipleship pastor.

==== Educator ====
By 2010, Sunberg had served as adjunct professor of church history for Northwest Nazarene University, and also as an adjunct faculty member for Nazarene Theological Seminary.

==== District Superintendency (2011–2014) ====
In September 2011, the Sunbergs were appointed as co-District Superintendents of the East Ohio District of the Church of the Nazarene. They assumed their responsibilities on November 1, 2011. While Sunberg was not the first woman appointed as a district superintendent in the Church of the Nazarene, this was the first time a husband and wife had been appointed co-district superintendents.

After six years of research under the supervision of Dr. Thomas A. Noble, on October 19, 2012, Sunberg was awarded a Ph.D. in Historical Theology from Nazarene Theological College, University of Manchester. Her successful dissertation was entitled, "The Cappadocian Mothers: Deification Exemplified in the Writings of Basil, Gregory and Gregory."

==== 10th President, Nazarene Theological Seminary (2014 to 2017) ====
On Friday, January 3, 2014, the Board of Trustees of Nazarene Theological Seminary elected Sunberg (Class of 2004) as the 10th President of Nazarene Theological Seminary on the first ballot. Sunberg accepted the election.

== Professional memberships, ecumenical and denominational activities ==
=== Wesleyan-Holiness Women Clergy (2006–current) ===
After serving on its board of directors as the official representative for the Church of the Nazarene since April 2006, including being Wesleyan-Holiness Women Clergy treasurer from June 2006 to May 2009, Sunberg served as the president of the Wesleyan-Holiness Women Clergy International organization for almost four years from May 6, 2009, to April 2013. Despite her resignation as Wesleyan-Holiness Women Clergy President in May 2013, Sunberg continues on their board of directors as past president. As a result of amendments to its bylaws in May 2012, as a member of the board of directors of the Wesleyan-Holiness Women Clergy, Sunberg is also an ex-officio member of the Steering Committee of the Wesleyan/Holiness Consortium.

=== Nazarene Theological Seminary ===
Sunberg has been the president of the Alumni Association of Nazarene Theological Seminary since 2009, and was re-elected to another four-year term in June 2013, thus making her an ex-officio member of the Board of Trustees of Nazarene Theological Seminary.

=== Church of the Nazarene ===
==== Nazarene Women Clergy Council (2007 to current) ====
In February 2007 Sunberg became the inaugural chairperson of the USA/Canada's Nazarene Women Clergy Council, a position she held until she resigned in Spring 2010. In 2013 Sunberg was elected to a four-year term as an at-large member of the USA/Canada Nazarene Women Clergy Council.

==== Pensions & Benefits USA (2009 to current) ====
Since 2009, Sunberg has been a member of the board of the Church of the Nazarene's Pensions & Benefits USA, and was, with Martha Stephens, the first women to be elected to that board.

==== Trustee, Mount Vernon Nazarene University (2011–2014) ====
Since November 2011, Sunberg has been a member of the Board of Trustees of Mount Vernon Nazarene University.

==== General Board, Church of the Nazarene (2013–2014) ====
At the 28th General Assembly of the Church of the Nazarene held in Indianapolis, Indiana, in June 2013, Sunberg was elected by the caucus of the USA East Central region for a four-year term as one of the 52 members of the denomination's General Board, which has governing responsibility for the international Church of the Nazarene between general assemblies.

Despite leading on several early ballots or election as the 41st General Superintendent of the Church of the Nazarene at the 28th General Assembly, after 53 ballots Sunberg was eventually runner-up to Gustavo Crocker, receiving 253 of the 630 votes needed for election. At the peak of her support, Sunberg received 515 of the 638 votes needed.

=== Other ===
In August 2012 Sunberg led a vision team from the United States to Kenya to learn more about the issue of gender-based violence and the work of the Nazarene Compassion Organization (Kenya) and Servant Forge. As a result of her increased awareness of the issues of Gender Based Violence globally and of the need for a Christian response, Sunberg has accepted a leadership role in the Kenya Gender-Based Violence Partnership. In February 2013 Sunberg said:

As a woman in leadership I realize that I have an obligation to be a voice for the marginalized and I feel that the Lord has encouraged me to speak out against issues of Gender Based Violence. We are seeing alarming numbers around the world – whether it is human trafficking here in the US or the rape and abuse of women around the world, we must be willing to speak up. Isn’t that what Jesus would do?

In 2010 Sunberg became a board member of the Segue Foundation, a non-profit organization that consulted for their Online Strategic Planning Tool.

== Author ==
Sunberg is the author (with Gene Van Note) of Faxes from Russia (Beacon Hill Press, 1996), which outlined the opening of the Church of the Nazarene in Russia. Additionally, Sunberg is the author of numerous articles for such publications as Holiness Today, Grow Magazine, and Reflecting God Magazine. Since September 2009, Sunberg has written "Reflecting the Image", a daily blog. In March 2014, Sunberg's latest book, Reclaiming Eve: The Identity and Calling of Women in the Kingdom of God, co-written with Suzanne Burden and Jamie Wright, will be released by Beacon Hill Press of Kansas City.

== Editor ==
In September 2006 Sunberg was appointed Managing Editor of New Horizons, an e-newsletter for Nazarene women clergy. Sunberg has been co-editor of New Horizons since Spring 2008. Additionally, Sunberg served as co-editor of Wellspring magazine.

== Speaker ==
Sunberg was one of the speakers at the first Nazarene European Women in Ministry Conference that was held in Greystones, Ireland in November 2003. In January 2005, Sunberg and her husband presented a paper "Developing an Indigenous Church" at the Eurasia Region of the Church of the Nazarene's annual Leadership Conference hosted by European Nazarene College (EuNC) in Büsingen, Germany. In October 2006, Sunberg was one of the speakers at Women Alive Ministries' Come to the Fire holiness conference held at College Church of the Nazarene in Olathe, Kansas, that attracted more than 1,200 participants from 9 nations and 35 US states. In September 2007, Sunberg was the guest speaker at the 8th Biennial Nazarene Melanesian Women's Conference attended by 800 women in Port Moresby, Papua New Guinea. Sunberg was one of the featured speakers at the Kansas City Holiness Summit at College Church of the Nazarene in Olathe, Kansas in October 2009.

Sunberg has often been a featured speaker at the Wesleyan Holiness Women Clergy's biannual Come to the Water Conferences. In her capacity as WHWC President, on May 13, 2012, Sunberg preached at a service honoring Nazarene pioneer woman biblical studies professor and preacher Olive Winchester at a conference at the University of Glasgow.

Drawing on the research for her 2012 Ph.D. dissertation, "The Cappadocian Mothers: Deification Exemplified in the Writings of Basil, Gregory and Gregory", in March 2013 Sunberg delivered the annual Gould Lectures on Holiness at Eastern Nazarene College. In these two lectures, Sunberg explored the concept of theosis and becoming like God in holiness through the lives and teaching of the Cappadocian fathers and mothers. In the first lecture, Sunberg taught that Jesus was the model and goal for Christian living, and challenged students to practice becoming like Jesus. In the second lecture, Sunberg described the faith journeys of the Cappadocian mothers and challenged students to embrace their call to deeper intimacy and union with Christ.

Sunberg was the speaker at the undergraduate commencement ceremony MNU on May 5, 2012. In September 2013, Sunberg was one of the speakers at the Mobilizing the Church for Social Justice conference hosted by the J. V. Morsch Center for Social Justice at Trevecca Nazarene University. In October 2013 Sunberg was one of the eight holiness preachers chosen to preach at the first Preaching Holiness in a Pluralistic World conference held on the campus of Nazarene Theological Seminary in Kansas City, Missouri, and was one of the two keynote speakers at the Christian Women's Leadership Conference at Mount Vernon Nazarene University.

== Awards and honors ==
On June 22, 1999, Sunberg and her husband Charles were both awarded a Distinguished Service Award by the Michigan District of the Church of the Nazarene.

In 2008 Sunberg was recognized as Alumna of the Year by her alma mater, MidAmerica Nazarene University (MNU).

On May 5, 2012, Sunberg and her husband Charles H. "Chuck" Sunberg were both awarded honorary Doctor of Divinity degrees from Olivet Nazarene University during its 99th Commencement ceremony. Citing their exemplary professional achievement, Christian influence and dedicated service to the Lord, the Church of the Nazarene, Olivet and their family, Dr. Gregg Chenoweth, vice president of academic affairs, stated: "The Sunbergs are wedded not only in marriage, but in ministry. They have distinguished themselves as gifted ministers for more than 20 years. They began a work from scratch in the former Soviet Union, a region double the land mass of the United States. After planting the Moscow Church of the Nazarene, they planted 50 churches in Ukraine, Armenia, Kazakhstan and other fledgling states."

== Personal life ==
On July 30, 1983, Sunberg married Charles Halston "Chuck" Sunberg (born April 6, 1956), the oldest son of Nazarene pastor William John Sunberg (born May 9, 1930, in Butler, Pennsylvania; died February 27, 1999, in Hutchinson, Kansas) and Thelma Gladys Roberts Sunberg (born February 3, 1932, in Pasadena, California; died August 1, 2007, in Quincy, Massachusetts); Chuck is a graduate of Olivet Nazarene University (1978), who also earned a Master of Divinity degree from Nazarene Theological Seminary. They have two children, Christa "Christy" Nicole Sunberg Maciver, and Cara Dawn Shonamon.

== Works ==
=== Dissertation ===
"The Cappadocian Mothers: Deification Exemplified in the Writings of Basil, Gregory and Gregory." Ph.D. dissertation, Nazarene Theological College, University of Manchester, 2012.

=== Books ===
- 1996. Faxes From Russia (with Gene Van Note). Kansas City, MO: Nazarene Publishing House.
- 2014. Reclaiming Eve: The Identity and Calling of Women in the Kingdom of God. (Co-written with Suzanne Burden and Jamie Wright). Kansas City, MO: Beacon Hill Press of Kansas City.

== Articles and chapters ==
- "Sanctification as Transformation". In Davenport, Keith. ed. Conversations on Holiness, 75–82. Kansas City, MO: Beacon Hill Press of Kansas City, 2013.
- "She Shines: the story of Macrina". November 13, 2013.
