= List of Church of the Nazarene conventions =

The Church of the Nazarene is a conservative, evangelical, Christian church in the Wesleyan-Holiness tradition. It is headquartered in the United States of America with nearly 3 million members worldwide. Church governance, as well as statements of the church's beliefs, are found in a book called The Manual of the Church of the Nazarene. This dictates: "The General Assembly shall meet every fourth year…”

The Church of the Nazarene also hosts other conventions and conferences that support the mission of the church and provide resources to pastors and laity across the globe. Each division under the Church could host a convention per their individual constitutions. Most notably is the convention for Nazarene Youth which began hosting a conference in 1958. Each geographical sub-region, or District, is required to host an annual assembly to report on the status of the church within those geographical boundaries.

The Manual also says: “The general superintendents and said commission shall also have power, in case of an emergency, to change the time and place of the meeting of the General Assembly." Which was the case for postponing the 2021 General Assembly to 2023 due to complications of travel visas, and vaccination requirements and social distancing due to the COVID-19 pandemic.

== General Assembly ==
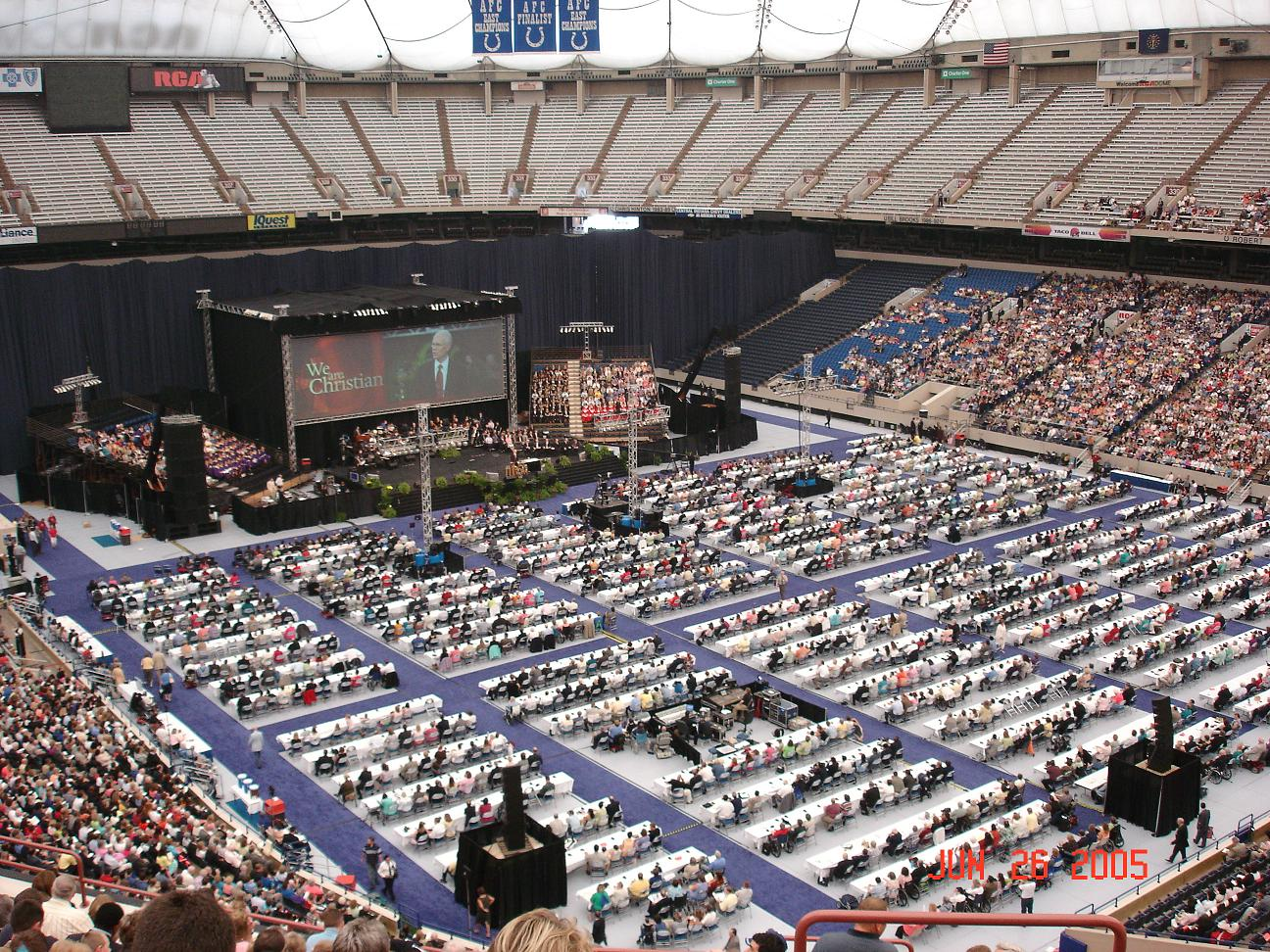
The 2005 General Assembly and Conventions at the RCA Dome in Indianapolis, Indiana.

The General Assembly and Conventions of the Church of the Nazarene (General Assembly, or GA) is the premier convention of the Church of the Nazarene, as it is provided for the supreme legislative body of the Church of the Nazarene. Since 1985, the General Assembly has been held in the year following the United States presidential election. General Assemblies offer workshops, networking, seminars, and praise and worship services for all delegates and guests.

The General Assembly comprises elected and ex officio delegates from around the world. The General Assembly elects six general superintendents and a General Board, in whom authority is vested between General Assemblies.

The general superintendents are assigned jurisdictional authority over the districts, regions and other institutions of the Church of the Nazarene, and are given authority to ordain qualified women and men into the ministry. (Article 304.5)"

The Church of the Nazarene announced in February 2007 that instead of a global convention to celebrate the centennial, each local church will participate in a global telecast on Sunday October 5, 2008.

Year	Dates	Location	Venue	Host District
1907	10 October	Chicago, Illinois	Chicago First Church	Chicago Central
1908	5–13 October	Pilot Point, Texas	Pilot Point First Church	Dallas
1911	October	Nashville, Tennessee	Pentecostal Mission & Ryman Auditorium	East Tennessee
1915	30 September - 11 October	Kansas City, Missouri	Kansas City First Church	Kansas City
1919	October	Kansas City, Missouri	unknown	Kansas City
1923	20 September - 2 October	Kansas City, Missouri	unknown	Kansas City
1928	14–25 June	Columbus, Ohio	Memorial Hall	Central Ohio
1932	12–24 June	Wichita, Kansas	The Forum	Kansas
1936	21–29 June	Kansas City, Missouri	Ararat Shrine Temple	Kansas City
1940	16–24 June	Oklahoma City, Oklahoma	Municipal Auditorium	Northwest Oklahoma
1944	18–23 June	Minneapolis, Minnesota	Municipal Auditorium	Minnesota
1948	20–27 June	St. Louis, Missouri	Kiel Auditorium	Missouri
1952	22–27 June	Kansas City, Missouri	unknown	Kansas City
1956	14–22 June	Kansas City, Missouri	unknown	Kansas City
1960	19–24 June	Kansas City, Missouri	unknown	Kansas City
1964	21–27 June	Portland, Oregon	unknown	Oregon Pacific
1968	16–21 June	Kansas City, Missouri	unknown	Kansas City
1972	18–23 June	Miami Beach, Florida	unknown	Southern Florida
1976	20–25 June	Dallas, Texas	Dallas Convention Center	Dallas
1980	22–27 June	Kansas City, Missouri	Bartle Hall	Kansas City
1985	23–28 June	Anaheim, California	Anaheim Stadium	Anaheim
1989	25–30 June	Indianapolis, Indiana	Hoosier Dome	Indianapolis
1993	25–30 July	Indianapolis, Indiana	Hoosier Dome	Indianapolis
1997	22–27 June	San Antonio, Texas	Alamodome	South Texas
2001	24–28 June	Indianapolis, Indiana	RCA Dome	Indianapolis
2005	18–28 June	Indianapolis, Indiana	RCA Dome	Indianapolis
2009	24 June - 3 July	Orlando, Florida	Orange County Convention Center	Central Florida
2013	19–27 June	Indianapolis, Indiana	Indiana Convention Center	Indianapolis
2017	21–30 June	Indianapolis, Indiana	Indiana Convention Center	Indianapolis
2021	cancelled	Indianapolis, Indiana	Indiana Convention Center	Indianapolis
2023	9-16 June	Indianapolis, Indiana	Indiana Convention Center	Indianapolis
2027	9-16 June	Kansas City, Missouri	Bartle Hall	Kansas City

== Missions Conference ==

In the mid-quadrennial year, the USA/Canada region of the Church of the Nazarene hosts a conference which focuses on missions and evangelism for the United States and Canada Region. Commonly referred to as M and the numeral of the year it takes place in. (i.e. 2011 was called M11). The most recent Missions Conference held was in Kansas City, Missouri.

Year	Dates	Location	Arena	Host District	Name
1999	-	Kansas City, Missouri	Bartle Hall	Kansas City	Millennium Celebration
2003	-	Nashville, Tennessee	Opryland Hotel	East Tennessee	M3
2007	February 19–21	Kansas City, Missouri	Bartle Hall	Kansas City	M7
2011	February 21–23	Louisville, Kentucky	Kentucky International Convention Center	Kentucky	M11
2015	February 9–11	Kansas City, Missouri	Bartle Hall	Kansas City	M15
2019	February 11–13	Kansas City, Missouri	Bartle Hall	Kansas City	M19
2025	February 10-12	Kansas City, Missouri	Kansas City Convention Center	Kansas City	M25

== Nazarene Youth International ==
The first NYI was known as the Nazarene Young Peoples Society. It was instituted in 1923. And is represented by those members of the Church of the Nazarene who are 13–25. In 2006, Nazarene Youth International (NYI) had 381,343 members. 181 Youth In Mission participates from 5 regional areas, and 2,320 Youthserve NYI Youthserve students served around the world for the Church of the Nazarene. The 22nd Convention of NYI held in Orlando, Florida was first truly global convention, featuring delegates in 7 other cities. These cities were Quito, Ecuador, Johannesburg, South Africa, Büsingen am Hochrhein, Germany, Santo Domingo, Dominican Republic, Manila, Philippines, Santa Cruz, Trinidad and Tobago, and Mumbai, India.

=== Nazarene Youth Conference ===
In 1958 the first Nazarene Youth Conference or NYC was held in Estes Park, Colorado. Originally called the "International Institute," it was the brain child of the Nazarene Young Peoples Society (now Nazarene Youth International) to celebrate the 50 anniversary of the founding of the Church of the Nazarene. NYC is for high school aged students attending Nazarene churches. The near week long event, is a mix of seminars, workshops, praise and worship, concerts, Bible quizzing, and inspirational key note addresses.

Held in the off-quadrennial to the General Assembly the selection of the NYC Host City is done by the NYI Council, and typically announced 2 years prior to the event.

NYC has been hosted in four countries, the United States, Switzerland, Mexico, and Canada, making it the first Nazarene convention to be held outside the United States. Starting in Houston, NYC 2003 was designated for the USA/Canada region of the church.

Previous names (used):

- International Institute (1958-1970)
- World Youth Conference (1974-1978)
- World Youth Congress (1983)
- Nazarene Youth Congress (1987-1999)
- Nazarene Youth Conference (2003-present)

Year	Dates	Location	Arena	Host District	Theme	Attendance
1958	July 15–21	Estes Park, Colorado	Estes Park Campground	Colorado	None	763
1962	July 3–9	Estes Park, Colorado	Estes Park Campground	Colorado	Operation Unbelievable	820
1966	July 12-18	Estes Park, Colorado	Estes Park Campground	Colorado	Tell the World	1,500
1970	July 14–20	Estes Park, Colorado	Estes Park Campground	Colorado	Let the Whole World Know	2,035
1974	July 18–23, 25-30	Fiesch, Switzerland	Fiesch-Eggishorn Valais	Northern Europe	Jesus the Hope	2,356
1978	July 11-17	Estes Park, Colorado	Estes Park Campground	Colorado	Jesus is Lord	2,400
1983	June 20-27	Oaxtepec, Mexico	Centro Vacacional	Mexico and Central America Region	Follow the Son	2,000
1987	July 7–14	Washington D.C.	University of Maryland	Mid-Atlantic	Share His Spirit	3,800
1991	July 23–28	Orlando, Florida	Orlando Convention Center	Central Florida	Dare To Run	5,200
1995	July 25–30	Phoenix, Arizona	US Airways Center	Arizona	It's Gonna Be Hot	6,600
1999	July 20–25	Toronto, Ontario, Canada	Air Canada Centre/Sky Dome	Canada Central	Are You Ready?	9.500
2003	July 22–27	Houston, Texas	Reliant Center	South Texas	Life Just Got Bigger: Discipleship the Journey	8,400
2007	July 10–15	St. Louis, Missouri	Edward Jones Dome/America's Center	Missouri	Water Fire Wind	8,800
2011	July 5–10	Louisville, Kentucky	KFC Yum! Center	Kentucky	Be Un: A World Unbroken	6,000
2015	July 8–12	Louisville, Kentucky	KFC Yum! Center	Kentucky	Thy Kingdom Come	7,060
2019	July 10–14	Phoenix, Arizona	Talking Stick Resort Arena	Arizona	Love God, Love Others	8,834
2023	July 5–9	Tampa, Florida	Amalie Arena/Tampa Convention Center	Southern Florida	Overflow	10,062
2026	July 1–5	Salt Lake City, Utah	Salt Palace Convention Center	Intermountain	Wonder	10,316
2029	July 4-8	Houston, Texas	Toyota Center or George R. Brown Convention Center	South Texas	-	-
2033	July	TBD in 2031	-	-	-	-

=== Third Wave ===
In addition to NYC, the Global NYI hosts an emerging leadership conference known as the Third Wave Conference.

Year	Dates	Location	Host Region
2004	Jan	Quito, Ecuador	South America Region
2007	Jan	Johannesburg, South Africa	Africa Region
2012	Jan	Bangkok, Thailand	Asia-Pacific Region
2015	Jan	San José, Costa Rica	Mesoamerica Region
2019	Jan	Hyderabad, India	Eurasia Region
