= Aguiar Valvassoura =

Brazilian pastor

Lazaro Aguiar Valvassoura is the pastor of the Campinas Central Church of the Nazarene in Campinas, Brazil. Campinas Central is one of the largest Church of the Nazarene congregations in the world. He has been the pastor there since 1980.

In 1997 Point Loma Nazarene University awarded Valvassoura an honorary Doctor of Divinity degree.

Valvassoura withdrew his name for consideration for general superintendent at the 2005 General Assembly. He withdrew his name after John Bowling was elected general superintendent and then declined to serve. When he withdrew, Valvassoura was likely to be the next person elected.
