= Fred A. Hillery =

Fred A. Hillery

Fred A. Hillery (August 25, 1854 – August 23, 1937) was an early leader in the American Holiness Movement; the founding president of the South Providence Holiness Association; the founding pastor of the People's Evangelical Church, the "mother church of the Church of the Nazarene in the East"; a co-founder of the Central Evangelical Holiness Association and also of the Association of Pentecostal Churches of America; one of the founders of the Pentecostal Collegiate Institute (now Eastern Nazarene College); one of the founding fathers of the Church of the Nazarene; and the publisher of holiness periodicals and books.

== Early years ==
=== Family background ===
Frederick Alverdo Hillery was born on August 25, 1854, in Barre, Vermont, the son of Luther A. B. Hillery (born about 1823 in Vermont; died before 1870), a farmer, and Lurana S. Howe (born about 1828 in Bridgewater, Massachusetts). Hillary's parents were married on April 15, 1847, at Nantucket, Massachusetts. and also had a daughter, Elma (born about 1861). After the death of Luther Hillery, Lurana married Edward Boden (born in January 1818 in Massachusetts) of Nantucket, Massachusetts, a cooper and farmer and widower, who had been married to her sister Mary Jane Howe (born about 1821).

=== Employment ===
By 1870 Hillery had finished school and was employed primarily doing farm duties on his step father's farm in Nantucket. By 1873 Hillery had moved to Providence, Rhode Island, where he was employed as a machinist and boarded at 527 High Street. By 1878 Hillery was employed as a streetcar conductor for the Union Railroad Company, and he and his wife lived at the U.R.R.-owned house at 862 Eddy Street in Providence. While still employed as a conductor, by 1880 Hillery and his wife lived at another U.R.R. house at 11 Searle Street (at the corner with Sayles Street), Providence, Rhode Island. By 1882 Hillery was again employed as a machinist, and had relocated to a house on 99 Swan Street. By 1884 Hillery had been promoted to foreman of the U.R.R. at 588 Eddy Street. By 1889 Hillery had become a printer and was living at 167 Swan Street, Providence.

=== Marriage and children ===
In 1877 Hillery married Della (or Delia) H. (born March 1858 in Massachusetts). Hillary and his wife had five children, with only three surviving infancy:

- Florence H. Hillery (born January 24, 1879; died February 14, 1880, in Rhode Island);
- Esther L. Hillery (born February 15, 1881; died May 3, 1882, in Rhode Island);
- Fred Alverdo Hillery Jr. (born March 9, 1883, in Rhode Island; died about 1939);
- Alice F. Hillary Steere (born September 1891 in Rhode Island); and
- Ruth F. Hillary (born March 1895 in Rhode Island).

== Ministry ==
=== St. Paul's Methodist Episcopal Church (1881-1887) ===
By 1881 Hillery was a member and class leader of the St. Paul's Methodist Episcopal Church which was located at the corner of Potter's and Prairie Avenues in Providence, Rhode Island and was elected Sunday School superintendent by the church board. From 1881 there was a revival of the Wesleyan doctrine of entire sanctification in the congregation due to the efforts of pastor T.J. Everett and various holiness evangelists, especially by Methodist Temperance crusader Miss Lizzie M. Boyd of Wheeling, West Virginia, who preached at the church in 1881 and again in 1883. "Camp meeting-like scenes were repeated at the church, including persons lying prostrate under the power of the Holy Spirit." Pastor Everett and his wife, and Hillery were among those who claimed this experience. A holiness testimony meeting according to the example of Phoebe Palmer was begun at the church each Tuesday. However, the revivals were opposed by many members of the congregation. The next pastor, Rev. Charles Henry Ewer (born February 1846 in Massachusetts; died October 10, 1912, in Rhode Island), canceled the holiness meeting, and refused to allow Hillery to be installed as Sunday School superintendent in an effort to compel the holiness advocates to support his fund-raising methods.

By December 1884 Ewer had been transferred to the Methodist Church at Stoughton, Massachusetts, and was succeeded by Rev. Edwin D. Hall, who continued Ewer's policy and criticised the holiness advocates publicly. As a consequence, on May 12, 1886, the South Providence Holiness Association (SPHA) was formed in the home of Methodist local preacher George E. Perry, and Hillery was elected the founding president. About sixty church members joined the SPHA, and a weekly meeting was held each Friday at a time not in competition to the activities of the St. Paul's church. Due to the increase in attendance at these meetings, a hall was rented, and special services were held with holiness evangelists. As Hall had warned Hillery and the other holiness advocates that their actions were against the Methodist Discipline, he responded by removing Hillery, Perry and G.H. Spear from their leadership of class meetings, disbanded their class meetings, and required the "dissenting' members to meet him on Friday evenings. 38 members refused to meet at that time but were willing to do so at any other time. After the St. Paul church was destroyed in a fire on December 5, 1886, Hall removed all Holiness Association members from teaching Sunday School in January 1887. After Hillery started Sunday School classes at the rented hall at the same time as those of the St. Paul church, Hillery was tried and expelled from the Methodist church on March 15, 1887. After unsuccessful appeals to the quarterly and annual conferences that confirmed his excommunication, Hillery wrote A History of the Revival of Holiness in St. Paul's M. E. Church, Providence, R. I., 1880–1887; or A Statement of the Circumstances which led to the Formation of the South Providence Holiness Association and the People's Evangelical Church, an 87 page apologetic defending his actions and those of his supporters.

=== The People's Evangelical Church (1887-1904) ===
On 21 July 1887 Hillery and 47 other former members of St. Paul's church founded the People's Evangelical Church with 51 charter members. The church was incorporated in Rhode Island on February 11, 1888, and was described as Wesleyan in doctrine and independent and congregational in organization and polity. The 1895 Manual of the People’s Church shows that "it observed a strict rule designed to create a disciplined and faithful community. Among the grounds for admonition and church discipline were “neglecting family prayers” and “unnecessary absence from class or communion.” Primary concerns were reflected in the church’s administrative structure, which had five committees: Sunday School, the Sick and Destitute, Care of the Church, Finance, and Baptism."

Hillery was "the congregation’s spiritual shepherd from the beginning," and served as the pastor until 1904. In 1889, Hillery was ordained to the ministry in an impressive service conducted by 13 independent Holiness ministers from around New England. At that time the church was located at 163 Oxford Street, Providence. By 1895 Hillery and his family were residing at 301 Swan Street, Providence.

=== The People's Pentecostal Church (1896-1904) ===
In 1896 the Central Evangelical Holiness Association (CEHA) joined the Association of Pentecostal Churches of America (APCA) co-founded by William Howard Hoople and Hiram F. Reynolds, and Hillery became a leader in the organization.

After becoming a member congregation of the APCA, by 1897 the People's Evangelical Church was renamed as the People's Pentecostal Church, and had relocated to Ashmont Street, and Hillery and his family were living nearby at 83 Ashmont Street.

By 1904 the church was located at Atwells Avenue at the corner with Bourn Street, South Providence, Rhode Island, "the geographical center of Providence".

=== Pentecostal Collegiate Institute (1900) ===
The APCA had founded the Pentecostal Collegiate Institute (PCI) in 1900 at the Garden View House in Saratoga Springs, New York. In 1902 Hillery purchased new land on behalf of the Association when it moved the school to North Scituate, Rhode Island.

The APCA, primarily an east-coast organization, merged with the primarily west-coast Church of the Nazarene in October 1907 to form the Pentecostal Church of the Nazarene, and PCI would become Eastern Nazarene College in 1918, one year before moving from Rhode Island to Wollaston Park, Massachusetts.

=== Publisher and editor ===
By 1898 Hillery began the Pentecostal Printing Company, and it was located initially at 877 Eddy Street, Providence. In 1907 Hillery indicated: "Our press and material at first were in one room in the house where we lived." From 1904 Hillery's printing presses were located at 212 Oxford Street, and Hillery was living nearby at 228 Oxford Street, Providence, Rhode Island. By 1915 Hillery was living at 408 Prairie Avenue, Providence. Early in the first decade of the twentieth century, Hillery released Songs of Beulah, a song book that he published. In the next decade Hillery wrote Body Salvation, an eight-page booklet, that was published by the Pentecostal Printing Company, the official publisher of the Association of Pentecostal Churches of America.

Hillery founded Beulah Items in September 1888 in Providence, Rhode Island, and served as editor. In May 1892 Beulah Items was merged with the Bible Christian edited by Congregational pastor Rev. Ezra B. Pike, with the Beulah Items and the "Bible Christian" both discontinued in favour of the Beulah Christian and both Hillery and Pike listed as editors. After the formation of the Association of Pentecostal Churches of America, the Beulah Christian became its official publication. From September 1904 the Beulah Christian was published weekly. There were attempts to merge the Beulah Christian with the Nazarene Messenger and other publications of the antecedent groups that formed the Pentecostal Church of the Nazarene into a new publication, the Herald of Holiness, but Hillery believed the offer to purchase the equipment and other assets of the Beulah Christian was inadequate. Nazarenes were encouraged to support the fledgling Herald of Holiness, which adversely affected subscriptions to the Beulah Christian, which prompted Hillery to merge the Beulah Christian with the Pentecostal Era and National Advocate of Perfect Love, which had been founded in August 1901 by Henry B. Hosley, then superintendent of the Washington D.C. District of the Church of the Nazarene and pastor of the Wesleyan Pentecostal Church of the Nazarene. to form the Pentecostal Christian. The last edition of the Beulah Christian was December 9, 1911, and the first edition under the new name was on December 23, 1911, under the editorial control of Hosley. Hosley left the Church of the Nazarene in 1913, and the Pentecostal Christian was discontinued in December 1915.

== Later years and death ==
By the age of 70 Hillery still owned Hillery Press at 212 Oxford Street, but had moved his home to 240 Atlantic Avenue, Lakewood, a suburb of Warwick, Rhode Island, where Della, and Ruth also lived. By 1930 his daughter Alice Steere, and her son, Charles, were also living there, after her divorce.

Hillery died in Providence, Rhode Island, in 1937.

== Books authored by Hillery ==
- 1887 A History of the Revival of Holiness in St. Paul's M. E. Church, Providence, R. I., 1880–1887; or A Statement of the Circumstances which led to the Formation of the South Providence Holiness Association and the People's Evangelical Church.
- 1900s Songs of Beulah.
- 1910s Body Salvation (Republished: Charles Edwin Jones).
