= Bible Missionary Church =

Christian denomination in the Wesleyan tradition

- Classification: Methodist
- Orientation: Conservative Holiness Movement
- Theology: Wesleyan-Arminian
- Origin: September 1955; Caldwell, Idaho
- Separated from: Church of the Nazarene
- Separations: Wesleyan Holiness Association of Churches (1959); Wesleyan Bible Holiness Church (1971); United Missionary Church; International Fellowship of Bible Churches (1988); Pilgrim Nazarene Church (2003); Churches of Wesleyan Brethren (2022)
- Members: 18,000 roughly worldwide

The Bible Missionary Church, founded in 1955, is a Methodist denomination of Christianity aligned with the conservative holiness movement. It is headquartered in the United States.

== History ==
The formation of the Bible Missionary Church is a part of the history of Methodism in the United States. Prior to its existence, a multitude of conservative Nazarene Preachers felt that their denomination, the Church of the Nazarene (a denomination whose founder was ordained in the Methodist Episcopal Church), was heading towards modernism; one of them was named Rev. Glenn Griffith. In the fall of 1955, Rev. Glenn Griffith held a tent revival in Idaho, and following the meeting the group assembled there felt convicted to form a new denomination patterned after their parent church. This denomination would be called the "Bible Missionary Union" (BMU), and Glenn Griffith would be their General Moderator. In the coming months, a number of Nazarene Churches would pull out to join the BMU. A year later, in 1956, the BMU would hold their General Conference in Colorado; in this meeting Rev. Elbert Dodd and Rev. Spencer Johnson joined this new denomination, and during the conference they renamed the denomination to "Bible Missionary Church". The Conference of 1956 voted to appoint Rev. Glenn Griffith and Rev. Elbert Dodd to be General Moderators of the Bible Missionary Church.

In the late 1950s the Bible Missionary Church built their Institution to train laymen and preachers in Rock Island, Illinois.

In 1958 Rev. Glenn Griffith and a few others left the Bible Missionary Church due to the issue of divorce, later forming the Wesleyan Holiness Association of Churches.

In 1987 several churches left the B.M.C. due to some conflict of interest regarding the direction of the church, and it would be considered a dark time for the denomination.

In 2003, several churches left the B.M.C. after the General Conference due to conservative usage of internet and legalism; however, unlike the 1987 split, the churches that left were a lot more organized in the matter and formed the Pilgrim Nazarene Church. The P.N.C. merged with the Bible Methodist Connection of Churches in 2019, though earlier in 2008, a couple of Pilgrim Nazarene Church churches left to form the Wesleyan Nazarene Church due to what they felt was modernism creeping into the Pilgrim Nazarene Church.

== Beliefs ==
The Bible Missionary Church adheres to Wesleyan-Arminian (Methodist) theology.

The BMC teaches that believers are cleansed from original sin and rebellion towards God by a second definite experience referred to as entire sanctification, as taught by the historic Methodist Church and the Church of the Nazarene from which the Bible Missionary Church originated. In conjunction with entire sanctification, the BMC teaches that true believers will live godly lives, manifesting this by compliance to an outward standard of holiness. Many of these standards are codified in the rules contained in the church manual. They believe that complete obedience to God is a joy and delight.

In 1999, the Bible Missionary Church adopted a resolution against same-sex marriage, forbidding its ministers to perform the wedding ceremonies of same-sex couples. Observance of Christian Sabbath, Sunday, is also expected by abstaining from unnecessary work or commerce and setting the day aside for worship and service to humanity.

The Bible Missionary Church holds a strong premillennialism view of the Second Coming of Jesus Christ, but its adherents hold a variety of views on the timing of the Rapture of the Church.

The Bible Missionary Church believes in aggressive evangelism but according to the last preacher list they have lost several churches.

== Church government ==
The Bible Missionary Church government is patterned on the Church of the Nazarene. Its form of government is republican in nature giving equal representation to local churches, lay members, and elders.

The church holds a general conference every four years at which major policy issues for the denomination as a whole are addressed. The most recent general conference took place August 2023 in Springdale Arkansas. The general conference elects general officers, including two general moderators, and a general board. The current General Moderators are Rev. Rodger Moyer and Rev. John Kinnaman. The general conference also governs additions and deletions to the manual (termed "memorials"). General conference business follows Parliamentary Procedure and Robert's Rules of Order.

In addition, the American church is composed of the following self-governing districts:

- Arkansas District (Arkansas),
- California-Arizona-Nevada District,
- Intermountain District (Colorado, New Mexico, Wyoming, Alaska, West Kansas),
- Iowa-Illinois District,
- Louisiana-South Texas District,
- Great Lakes District (Michigan, Wisconsin, and Ontario)
- Midwest District (Missouri, East Kansas)
- Northeast District (New England, Pennsylvania, and Eastern seaboard),
- Northwest District (Idaho, Montana, East Oregon),
- North Pacific District (Washington, West Oregon),
- Southeast District (Alabama, Tennessee, Georgia, Florida),
- Southwest District (Oklahoma, Texas).
- North Central District

(Indiana, Ohio, Kentucky). Disbanded 2023 Although most foreign churches come under the jurisdiction of the foreign missions committee (appointed by the general board), the churches in Mexico, Japan, Papua New Guinea, and the Philippines are self-governing, organized districts of the Bible Missionary Church, while the churches in Canada are included with American districts.

== Educational institutions ==
The Bible Missionary Church's schools include Bible Missionary Institute, a 4-year Bible college in Rock Island, Illinois. Bible Missionary Institute offers four-year degrees in theology, Missions, Religious Education, Music, and General Studies, as well as associate degrees. The Bible Missionary Church also operates a Spanish Bible college in Houston, Texas as well as Beulah Mountain Christian Academy in Whitley City, Kentucky, a K-12 boarding school for at-risk children. Unlike other Holiness organizations they prohibit their young people from associating with other holiness organizations.

In addition, the denomination maintains schools in Mexico, Papua New Guinea, the Philippines, Ghana, Guyana, and Nigeria.
