= Jerald Johnson =

Jerald D. Johnson (August 16, 1927, in Curtis, Nebraska–April 28, 2020) was a minister and emeritus general superintendent in the Church of the Nazarene.
