= Nazarene Youth United Kingdom =

Organisation

Nazarene Youth United Kingdom (NYUK), is an organisation for the youth of the Church of the Nazarene of the United Kingdom.

The organisation supports young Christians in the UK through a network of friends and fellowship. Although the Nazarene youth in the UK have been active for many years, use of the term NYUK is fairly recent.

NYUK organises events from weekend sleepovers to a district youth holiday for 1 week each year. The main focus of these holidays is to give young people positive life experiences, to encourage Christian young people and to give others the opportunity to become informed about the beliefs and teachings of Christianity.

NYUK is led by a district council which are democratically elected by the members of the Church of the Nazarene. NYUK is split into 2 districts, the North encompassing Scotland and Northern Ireland, and the South encompassing England and Wales. Within these 2 districts there are sub-districts.
