= Joseph G. Morrison =

Joseph G. Morrison (1871–1939) was an American minister and general superintendent in the Church of the Nazarene.

Born in Oskaloosa, Iowa on March 27, 1871, and raised in South Dakota. Morrison served as a U.S. Army captain in the Spanish–American War before becoming a Methodist minister. Dr. Joseph G. Morrison was one of the founders of the Laymen's Holiness Association, and served as its president until he joined the Church of the Nazarene in 1921. He was a district superintendent until he was elected president at Northwest Nazarene College in 11926. While at NNC, he led the community in its transition from President Wiley's leadership to an institution capable of standing on its own. He was honored at NNC by being the first president to have a building bear his namesake. From 1927 to 1936 Morrison was the executive secretary of the Department of Foreign Missions. Dr. Morrison was elected general superintendent in 1936, and served in that office until his death in 1939.
