= Edgar Ellyson =

American clergyman (1869–1954)

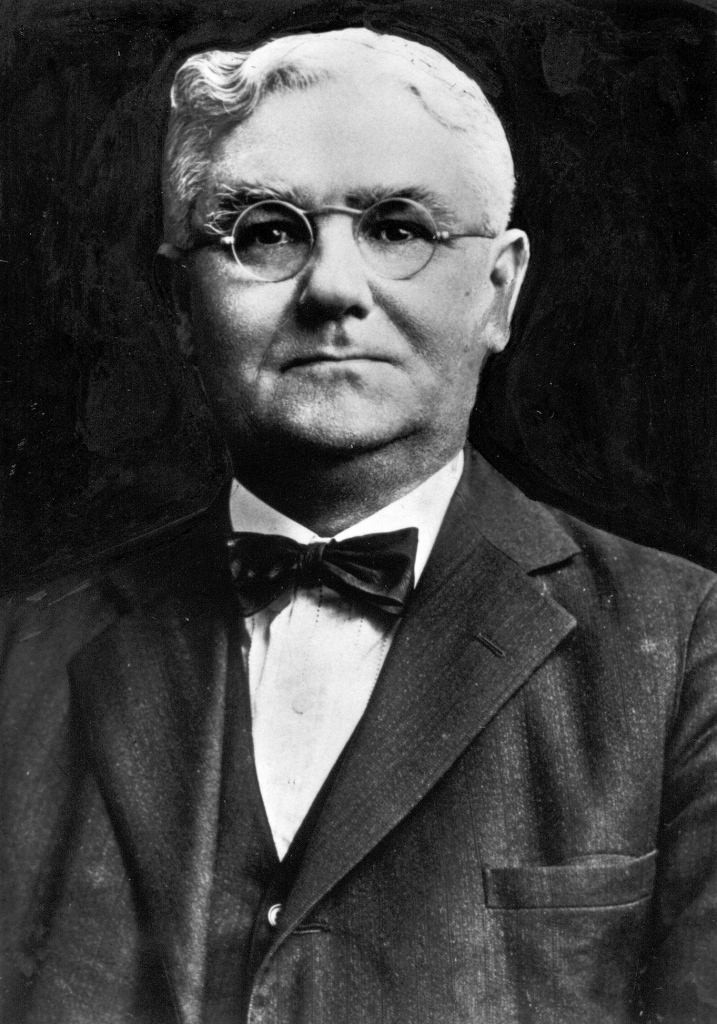
E.P. Ellyson, 3rd general superintendent

Edgar Painter Ellyson (1869–1954) was a minister, theologian, and general superintendent in the Church of the Nazarene.

== Biography ==
Ellyson was born in Damascus, Ohio, August 4, 1869, of Quaker parentage. He became a Quaker minister and the headmaster of the Friends' Bible School in Marshalltown, Iowa. In 1907, he succeeded Aaron Merritt Hills as the president of Peniel College in Greenville, Texas.

Due to his sympathies with the Holiness movement and his living in nearby Greenville, Ellyson was at the Second General Assembly of the Pentecostal Church of the Nazarene in Pilot Point, Texas. He was elected general superintendent in 1908, remaining in that position through 1911. During that time, he traveled between the various congregations of the new church, at the same time evangelizing and organizing the new church, while still remaining president of Peniel College. In later years, he would become president of Pasadena College, Olivet Nazarene College, Trevecca Nazarene, and Bresee College.

He also served as a vital force in the Church's educational works in general. He was responsible for establishing the Department of Church Schools, and also was the chief editor of the church's Sunday school publications for many years. In 1924, he was the chairman of the committee that revised the Nazarene Manual. His major published work, Theological Compend, published in 1908, was the first systematic theology arising out of the American Holiness Movement. It placed emphasis on the basic themes of Holiness theology, and was later used by theologians like A. M. Hills and H. Orton Wiley as one of the foundations of their own thinking.

At the 1915 General Assembly, Ellyson was again elected as general superintendent. He was not in attendance and had to travel to Kansas City by train to address the General Assembly. Upon his arrival, he declined the election.
