= Mary Lee Cagle =

Pastor in the early Church of the Nazarene

Mary Lee (Harris) Cagle (12 September 1864 – 1955), sometimes called the Mother of Holiness in West Texas, was one of the first influential women and pastors in the early Church of the Nazarene. She was first married to the Rev. Robert Lee Harris, a revivalist. In 1894 Rev. Harris and his wife organized a fourteen-member church in Milan, Tennessee called New Testament Church of Christ. The church placed special emphasis on holiness. The influence of this movement that the Harris church started in Milan quickly spread into Arkansas and Texas. Upon Harris' death from tuberculosis, his wife took over his work with the assistance of a couple of other women in the church. In November 1904 the Milan New Testament Church of Christ met in Rising Star, Texas to agree to a church union with the Independent Holiness Church. Over the following year, a joint committee adopted the merger and took on the name "Holiness Church of Christ" Mary Lee Cagle was present at the meeting at Pilot Point, Texas where this church merged with other churches to become the Church of the Nazarene.

== Early life ==
Mary Lee Cagle was born Mary Lee Wasson on 12 September 1864 at Moulton, Alabama. She felt called to the ministry as a young woman, but her family discouraged her, so she decided to become a teacher. At the age of 27, she married Robert Lee Harris, an itinerant evangelist.

== Career ==
Near the close of the century, Sister Mary Lee moved her base of operations to Buffalo Gap, Texas, south of Abilene. In 1900, she married Henry Clay Cagle, a former cowhand who had been converted under her ministry. She and her husband organized twenty-eight churches, including congregations in Texas, New Mexico, and Wyoming.

== Works ==
- The Life and Work of Mary Lee Cagle, [1928?]. Autobiography.
