= Christian Wismer Ruth =

C. W. Ruth was one of the ten founding fathers of the Church of the Nazarene. Ruth grew up in Indianapolis, and from an early age was an evangelist for the Holiness Christian Church. In 1902 Ruth merged the Spokane, Washington holiness churches of the People's Mission into the Church of the Nazarene. He was considered a conservative, who also thought unity was the most important issue facing the Church of the Nazarene during the turn of the century.
