= Nazarene Missionaries =

Category of missionaries

Nazarene Missionaries are missionaries trained and supported by the Church of the Nazarene. There are currently 737 missionaries. Missionaries are sent around the world as a means for evangelism and church development. The Nazarene missionary is a member of the clergy or a layperson who has been appointed by the General Board to work a ministerial position through the World Mission Department/Evangelism Committee or through the USA/Canada Mission/Evangelism Committee.

== Activities ==
Nazarene missionaries minister in more than 156 world areas and are deployed from 40 world areas.

== LINKS ==
Nazarene missionaries are assigned to districts, and then on the district level the missionaries are assigned to a local church. Each local church has an opportunity to become personally acquainted with the missionary family assigned to their church through a program called LINKS (Loving Interested Nazarenes Knowing and Sharing). The LINKS program connects missionaries with Nazarenes around the world. Churches send care packages, cash, and other gifts to their LINKS missionaries.

== Finances ==
It takes a lot of support to keep missionaries on the mission field. Donations made to a missionary help in many areas; ministry assignment, language school, child education, medical plan, daily living expenses, etc. The World Mission Department is the major support system for missionaries in the Church of the Nazarene. The World Mission Department has developed various ways to support missionaries serving on the mission field.
