= Church of the Nazarene =

Evangelical Christian denomination

- Seal of the Church of the Nazarene
- Classification: Protestant
- Orientation: Methodist
- Theology: Wesleyan–Holiness
- Polity: Mixed: elements of Congregationalist, Presbyterian, and Episcopal polities
- Associations: Christian Holiness Partnership; Wesleyan Holiness Connection; National Association of Evangelicals; World Methodist Council; Global Wesleyan Alliance
- Region: Global
- Headquarters: Lenexa, Johnson County, Kansas United States
- Founder: Include: Phineas F. Bresee, Hiram F. Reynolds, William Howard Hoople, Mary Lee Cagle, Robert Lee Harris, J.B. Chapman, and C. W. Ruth
- Origin: October 13, 1908; Pilot Point, Texas, U.S.
- Branched from: Church of the Nazarene (1895), Association of Pentecostal Churches of America (1897), and Holiness Church of Christ (1904)
- Merger of: 15 Holiness denominations 1907–1988
- Separations: Pentecost-Pilgrim Church (1917); Bible Missionary Church (1955); Holiness Church of the Nazarene (1958); Church of the Bible Covenant (1967); Crusaders Churches (1972)
- Congregations: 29,424 (2025)
- Members: 2,764,205 (2025)
- Official website: nazarene.org

The Church of the Nazarene is an evangelical Christian denomination that emerged in North America from the Wesleyan-Holiness movement within Methodism during the late 19th century. Its members are commonly referred to as Nazarenes or Nazarene Methodists.

The denomination has its headquarters in Lenexa, Kansas. It is the largest denomination in the world aligned with the Wesleyan-Holiness movement, with just under 3 million members worldwide. The Church of the Nazarene is a member denomination of the World Methodist Council and is known for its emphasis on the doctrine of sanctification.

== Mission and vision ==
The mission of the Church of the Nazarene is taken from the Great Commission in Matthew 28. "To make Christlike disciples in the nations" was adopted in 2006 as the Church's mission statement. In 2009, it refined that mission statement to be expressed by "making disciples through evangelism, education, showing compassion, working for justice, and bearing witness to the kingdom of God."

The denominational vision is "to be a disciple-making church, an international community of faith, in the Wesleyan-Holiness tradition".

=== Core values ===
Since 2001, the three "core values" of the Church have been identified as "Christian, Holiness, Missional". In 2013, the Church adopted seven characteristics to express the core values which are meaningful worship, theological coherence, passionate evangelicalism, intentional discipleship, church development, transformational leadership, and purposeful compassion.

The guiding principles for the Church are found in a book called The Manual for the Church of the Nazarene (also referred to as just The Manual) and it is updated every four years during a convention called General Assembly. General Assembly is "the supreme doctrine-formulating and lawmaking body of the Church of the Nazarene". The Manual is the official "statement of faith and practice of the church... and therefore authoritative as a guide for action".

The Manual includes a brief historical statement of the denomination; the sixteen core beliefs, or Articles of Faith; its Constitution details the Church polity; and guidance on living a contemporary Christian lifestyle.

== History ==
The formation of the Church of the Nazarene is a part of the history of Methodism in the United States. The Church of the Nazarene is the product of a series of mergers that occurred between various holiness churches, associations and denominations throughout the 20th century, with roots starting in the 1880s. Churches with similar points of view concentrated in New England, California and Texas agreed to meet and align more formally as one denomination. The first of these meetings was in Chicago in 1907, followed by another in Pilot Point, Texas in 1908. These meetings, now known as General Assemblies, resulted in the formation of the Church of the Nazarene as it appears today, with a centralized denominational headquarters in Kansas City, Missouri.

=== Formation and early years (1890–1907) ===
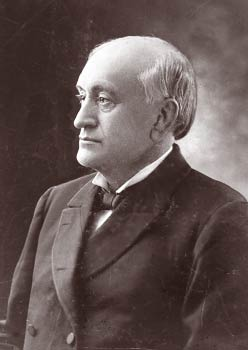
Phineas Bresee sought to return to John Wesley's original goals of preaching the good news of the gospel to the poor and underprivileged.

The origins of the Church of the Nazarene today have seeds in the Third Great Awakening period in America. In October 1895, Bresee and Widney founded a church in downtown Los Angeles to refocus the Methodist Episcopal Church on serving the poor living in cities, under the name Church of the Nazarene. Groups with similar beliefs along the east coast known as the Association of Pentecostal Churches of America, which itself was a merger of two older denominations dating back to 1890 called The Central Evangelical Holiness Association, were led by Fred A. Hillery, C. Howard Davis and William Howard Hoople. On November 12, 1896, these two groups met in Brooklyn and agreed to merge, which included retaining the name and Manual of Hoople's group. Both the east coast churches and Bresee's west coast church met in Chicago from October 10–17, 1907, and decided to merge into a new church named The Pentecostal Church of the Nazarene. This has since been considered the First General Assembly of the Church. At the time of its merger with the Church of the Nazarene in 1907, the APCA existed principally from Nova Scotia to Iowa and the northeastern United States.

In April 1908, Bresee accepted Edgar P. Ellyson, president of the Holiness University of Texas of Peniel, Texas; his wife, Mary Emily Ellyson; and its members of the Holiness Association of Texas into the Pentecostal Church of the Nazarene. In September 1908, the Pennsylvania Conference of the Holiness Christian Church under the leadership of Horace G. Trumbauer merged with the Pentecostal Church of the Nazarene.

The newly merged east and west coast branches now focused on merging with the Holiness Church of Christ in the southern United States. The Holiness Church of Christ itself was the merger of the New Testament Church of Christ (founded in July 1894 in Milan, Tennessee, by R.L. Harris, but soon led by his widow Mary Lee Cagle), and a group (also called the Holiness Church of Christ), that formed in November 1904 at Rising Star, Texas from the prior merger of The Holiness Church (founded in 1888 in Texas) and the Independent Holiness Church formed at Van Alstyne, Texas, in 1901, and led by Charles B. Jernigan and J.B. Chapman.

The merger of the Holiness Church of Christ in the south and the Pentecostal Church of the Nazarene took place in Pilot Point, Texas on Tuesday, October 13, 1908, at 10:40 am, "amid great shouts of joy and holy enthusiasm." This is considered to be the Second General Assembly of the Church of the Nazarene. The latter date marks the "official" founding date. Bresee, Reynolds and Ellyson were elected general superintendents. The newly merged Church of the Nazarene began with 10,034 members, 228 congregations, 11 districts, and 19 missionaries.

Other independent bodies joined at later dates, including the Pentecostal Church of Scotland (founded in 1909 by Rev. George Sharpe) and the Pentecostal Mission (founded in 1898 by J.O. McClurkan), both in 1915. In 1922, more than one thousand members and most of the workers led by Joseph G. Morrison, from the Laymen's Holiness Association (founded in 1917) located in the Dakotas, joined the Church of the Nazarene. Additional smaller churches would be merged into the Nazarene Church during the 1940–60s.

==== Denominational name ====
The name of the denomination comes from the biblical description of Jesus Christ, who had been raised in the village of Nazareth, in Galilee, and using the demonym of Nazarene. Jesus, and later his followers, is called a Nazarene in several bible verses, as well as many bible translations, such as the NASB Bible and KJV. It was first used in October 1895 by Phineas F. Bresee's church based in downtown Los Angeles, California.

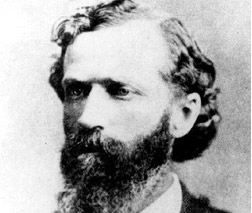
Joseph Pomeroy Widney

It was first recommended by Joseph Pomeroy Widney, a former president of the University of Southern California and an influential figure in the early days of the Church of the Nazarene on the West Coast. The denomination started as a church that ministered to the homeless and poor, and wanted to keep that attitude of ministering to "lower classes" of society.

Bresee's west coast portion met with similar holiness churches based in south and along the east coast of the United States. The southern churches were under the name Association of Pentecostal Churches of America. To reflect both denominational tributaries the newly formed merged church operated under the title the Pentecostal Church of the Nazarene.

The term "Pentecostal" in the church's original name soon proved to be increasingly problematic. Inside the Wesleyan-holiness movement, the word was used widely as a synonym simply for "holiness". However, the rise of 20th century Pentecostalism, especially after 1906, new meanings and associations, "particularly in regards to charismatic gifts like speaking in tongues," attached themselves to the term – meanings that the Pentecostal Nazarenes rejected.

In 1919, at the fifth General Assembly in Nashville, the Church voted to remove the word "Pentecostal" from the church name, returning to Breese's Los Angeles' Church name, simply as Church of the Nazarene.

=== The First Century (1907–2008) ===
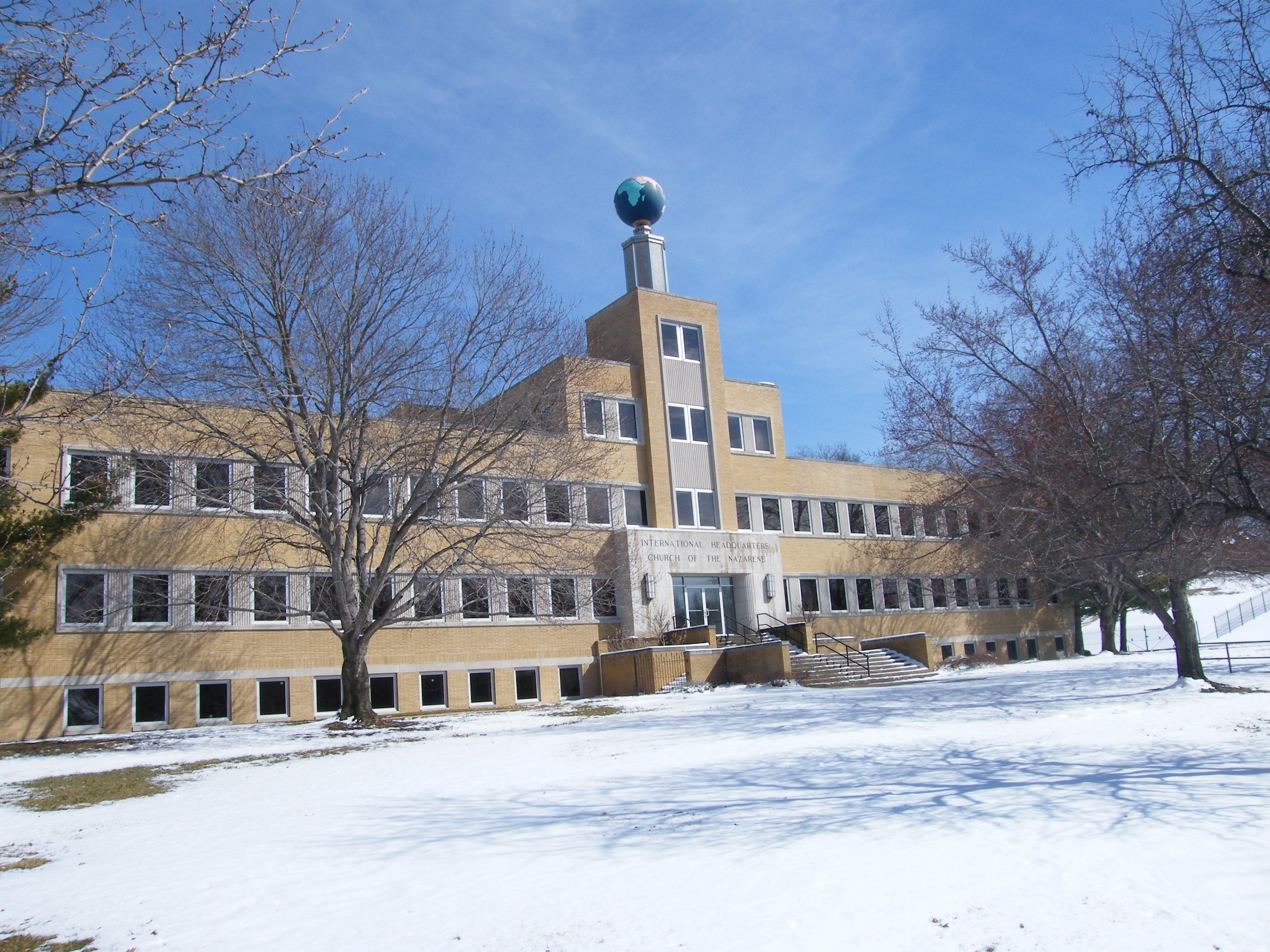
Former International Headquarters of the Church of the Nazarene, Kansas City

By 1908, there were churches in Canada and organized work in India, Swaziland, Cape Verde, and Japan, soon followed by work in central Africa, Mexico, and China. The 1915 mergers added congregations in the British Isles and work in Cuba, Central America, and South America. There were congregations in Syria and Palestine by 1922. General Superintendent Reynolds advocated "a mission to the world", and support for world evangelization became a distinguishing characteristic of Nazarene life. Taking advantage of new technologies, the church began producing the Showers of Blessing radio program in the 1940s, followed by the Spanish broadcast La Hora Nazarena and later by broadcasts in other languages. At the time of the 50th anniversary of the denomination in October 1958, a total of 19.8% of all Nazarenes lived outside the continental United States, and by 2008, that number was close to 45%. By 2020, the number of Nazarene members living outside of the USA is around 75%.

Hiram F. Reynolds, championed the church to grow outside of the United States. Influenced by the indigenous church mission theories of Anglican Henry Venn and American Board of Commissioners for Foreign Missions secretary Rufus Anderson, from the beginning of the global expansion of the Church of the Nazarene, there was a commitment to the development of indigenous churches and districts within the framework of a unitary global denomination under the authority of the Manual. As early as March 3, 1914, Nazarene mission policy developed for the work in Japan by Reynolds encouraged the creation of "self-supporting and self-governing churches.

By the 1930s, Nazarene missions leaders "did not aim toward the development of autonomous national churches, but a federation of districts. They did not plan for indefinite missionary control. Without a great deal of thought about where this would lead, without consciously copying any other denomination's model of church government, and without much theological reflection, the Church of the Nazarene became an international body." The first non-missionary district superintendents were George Sharpe in Britain and Vicente G. Santin, appointed district superintendent in Mexico in 1919.

In January 1936, the General Board divided the Japan District into two, and the Western or Kwansai district became the first regular district in the denomination, "with all the rights and privileges of any of the North American and British Isles districts subject to the Manual and the General Assembly", however the effects of World War II on the church in Japan saw the two districts reunified and revert to a missionary-led district.

The process of internationalization, a deliberate policy of being one church of congregations and districts worldwide, rather than splitting into national churches like earlier Protestant denominations started in 1964 at the General Assembly in Portland, Oregon. With the founding parents of the church gone, the next generation of leaders struggled with interpreting the vision they were given. These main struggles dealt with speaking in tongues and legalism, which the majority of churches that broke away from the Nazarene church doing so in the 1960s.

At the General Assembly held in 1972 in Miami Beach, Florida, the Church adopted several policies, now known as the Covenant of Christian Conduct, into The Manual. These included statements advising how a Nazarene should view and act in regards to contemporary social issues, like abortion, human sexuality, gambling, and entertainment. These are still a feature of The Manual, the wording of which are updated and adjusted every four years at the General Assembly. It was only in 1972 that the general secretary of the church began to include overseas membership in reporting totals, as prior to this time it had been difficult to collect the needed data.

In 1974, the Nazarene Young Peoples Society (now Nazarene Youth International) in its desire to be more inclusive, held its fifth International Institute on the campus of European Nazarene Bible College in Büsingen, Germany, the first one held outside the United States. In 1978, the Church fully integrated some of its segregated church in the American South by merging the Black overlay Districts into their respective geographic main districts. Even though women have been allowed to preach since the church's inception, promotion to higher ranking leadership levels was not church practice. In 1988, the church had only promoted 2 women to the District Superintendent levels. The first of which was in 1926.

2000 marked the peak of membership in the Church in the United States. By the 2001, General Assembly, held in Indianapolis, 42 percent of delegates were not native English speakers. As many elected delegates from outside the United States could not attend the General Assembly due to US immigration policies, financial or other reasons, the General Assembly authorized the creation of "a committee to address the concern that a high percentage of non-North American/non-United States delegates are unable to attend a General Assembly". 2003 had the largest Nazarene Youth Conference to date with 12,000 students meeting in Houston, Texas. In 2005, the General Assembly elected the first person of color and 2nd non-US resident, as well as the first woman (Nina Gunter) to the General Superintendent office.

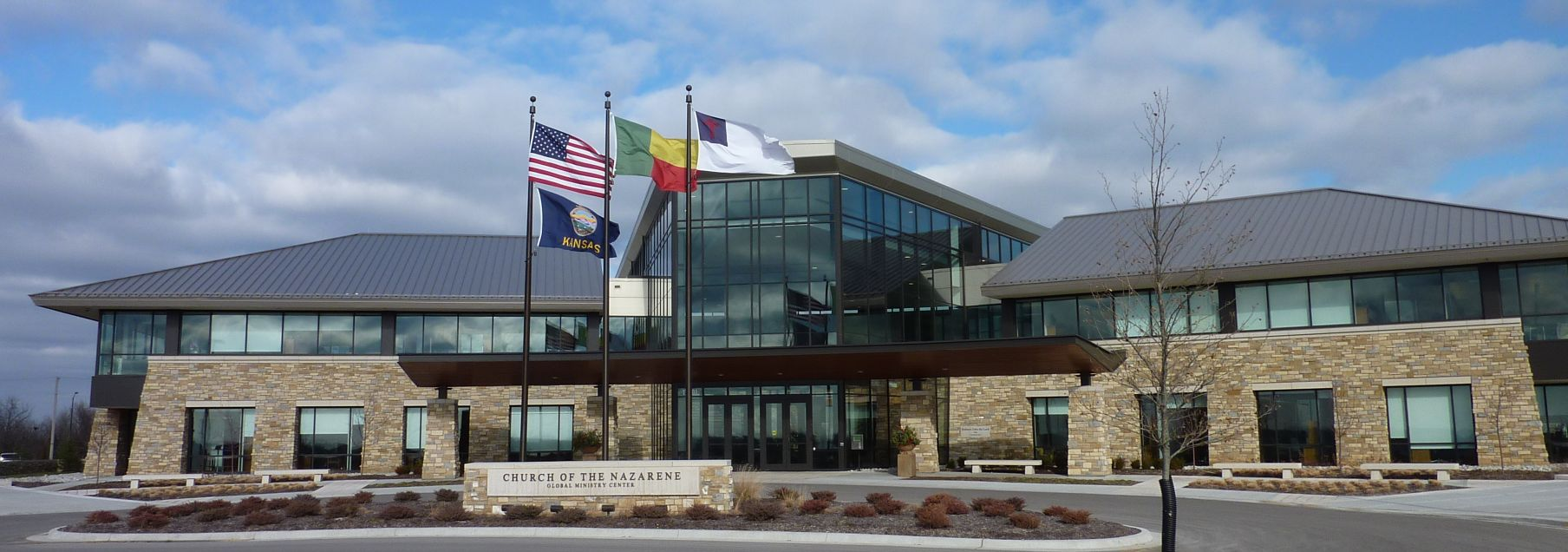
The Global Ministry Center, designed by 360 Architecture, in Lenexa opened in 2008

As the Church approached its 100th anniversary, the Board of General Superintendents decided to have regional and local Centennial celebrations rather than one global gathering. It also made a controversial move from downtown Kansas City into Lenexa, Kansas, which was seen as abandoning the primary call of ministering to the inner cities. The new Global Ministry Center opened in 2008, centralized many of the church's departments in one building, versus the campus style of the former Headquarters building.

==== Separations ====
Throughout its history, there have been several groups that separated from the Church of the Nazarene to form new denominations. Among the new denominations formed by those seceding or being expelled from the Church of the Nazarene are: the People's Mission Church (1912); the Pentecost Pilgrim Church (1917); the Bible Missionary Church (1955); the Holiness Church of the Nazarene (1961) in the Philippines; the Church of the Bible Covenant (1967); the Crusaders Churches of the United States of America (1972); and the Fellowship of Charismatic Nazarenes (1977). The Crusaders Churches were organized due to a difference in belief on teaching regarding divorce and remarriage. The formation of the Fellowship of Charismatic Nazarenes was a result of differences on the use of charismatic gifts of the Holy Spirit in church services. Individual churches have also left to become independent, although this is still rare. Most notably Gold Creek Community Church in Washington became non-denominational in 2012.

=== The Second Century (2009–present) ===
At the 2009 General Assembly the delegates voted to create a global Manual that would be streamlined in comparison to recent Manuals, consist of the foreword, and Parts I, II, and III of the current Manual, and would also include parts of the Manual that are global in scope, retaining the universally appropriate polity and principles." The General Assembly authorized the different regions to adapt the Manual to fit specific cultural contexts and would function as a "regional Manual policy handbook."

In 2017, the Church elected two more people of color and one more woman (Carla Sunberg) to fill vacancies in the Board of General Superintendents. During the COVID-19 global pandemic, the church worked to provide medical help to its world areas. It also postponed its General Assembly until 2023. The 2023 General Assembly delegates elected Christian Sarmiento, who was the 45th General Superintendent and fifth person who is a non-US resident.

== Theology and doctrine ==
The Church of the Nazarene is a Methodist denomination that emerged during the holiness movement. The official doctrines of the Church of the Nazarene are published in the Manual: Church of the Nazarene, which is published quadrennially after the General Assembly, the primary convention and gathering of Nazarenes, at which leaders are elected, and amendments and suggestions are incorporated into the Manual. The Manual is published in print, and is available online at the Nazarene Church's website. Nazarenes have established 16 "Articles of Faith" as a guiding principle for living Christianity. The "Articles" include the following: one eternal self-existent God manifest in a Trinity; the divinity of Jesus and the Holy Spirit; the authority of the Bible; Original and Personal Sin; the work of atonement; prevenient grace; the need for repentance; justification, regeneration, and adoption; entire sanctification; the church; creedal baptism; the Lord's Supper for all believers; divine healing; the return of Jesus Christ; and the resurrection of the dead. A key outgrowth of this theology is the commitment of Nazarenes not only to the Evangelical Gospel of repentance and a personal relationship with God, but also to compassionate ministry to the poor.

While there is no official theology text authorised by the denomination, there are several that have been widely used in the pre-ordination training course for ministers. In the early years of the denomination, books by John Miley and William Burt Pope were used. The most influential theologians within the Church of the Nazarene have been Edgar P. Ellyson, author of Theological Compend (1908); A. M. Hills, author of Fundamental Christian Theology (1931); H. Orton Wiley, author of the three-volume Christian Theology (1940–1943); Mildred Bangs Wynkoop, author of A Theology of Love (1972) and Foundations of Wesleyan-Arminian Theology (1972); Richard S. Taylor, author of A Right Conception of Sin (1945) and Exploring Christian Holiness, Vol.3: The Theological Formulation (1985); H. Ray Dunning, author of Grace, Faith & Holiness (1988); and J. Kenneth Grider, author of A Wesleyan-Holiness Theology (1994). Contemporary Nazarene theologians include Bryan Stone, Rob Staples, and Thomas A. Noble. Noble has been commissioned to write a three-volume systematic theology for the denomination that seeks to be intellectually coherent, comprehensive, contemporary, and global.

=== Arminianism ===
The Church of the Nazarene stands in the Arminian tradition of free grace for all and human freedom to choose to partake of that saving grace. The Nazarene Church distinguishes itself from many other Protestant churches because of its belief that God's Holy Spirit empowers Christians to be constantly obedient to God—similar to the belief of other churches in the Wesleyan-Holiness movement. The Nazarene Church does not believe that a Christian is helpless to sin every day. Rather, it teaches that sin should be the rare exception in the life of a sanctified Christian. Also, there exists the belief in entire sanctification, the idea that a person can have a relationship of entire devotion to God in which they are no longer under the influence of original sin. This means that, through the power of the Holy Spirit, people can be changed so as to be able to live a holy life for the glory of God. The concept of entire sanctification (also called Christian perfection and Baptism with the Holy Ghost) stems from John Wesley's teaching. This is interpreted on a variety of different levels; as with any denomination, certain believers interpret the theology more rigidly and others less so.

In recent years, Nazarene theologians have increasingly understood the movement's distinctive theological doctrine, entire sanctification, as best understood in terms of love. Love is the core notion of the various understandings of holiness and sanctification found in the Bible. Christians are called to love when in relation to God and others.

=== Distinctive Wesleyan emphases ===
The spiritual vision of early Nazarenes was derived from the doctrinal core of John Wesley's preaching and the holiness movement of the 19th century. The affirmations of the church include justification by grace through faith alone in Jesus Christ, sanctification by grace through faith united with good works, entire sanctification as an inheritance available to every Christian, and the witness of the Spirit to God's work in human lives. The holiness movement arose in the 1830s to promote these doctrines, especially Entire Sanctification, but splintered by 1900. The Church of the Nazarene remains committed to Christian holiness. The key emphasis of Wesley's theology relates to how Divine grace operates within the individual. Wesley defined the Way of Salvation as the operation of grace in at least three parts: Prevenient Grace, Justifying Grace, and Sanctifying Grace.

Prevenient grace, or the grace that "goes before" us, is given to all people. It is that power which enables us to love and motivates us to seek a relationship with God through Jesus Christ. This grace is the present work of God to turn us from our sin-corrupted human will to the loving will of the Father. In this work, God desires that we might sense both our sinfulness before God and God's offer of salvation. Prevenient grace allows those tainted by sin to nevertheless make a truly free choice to accept or reject God's salvation in Christ.

Justifying Grace, or Accepting Grace, is the grace offered by God to all people, that we receive by faith and trust in Christ, through which God pardons the believer of sin. It is in justifying grace we are received by God, in spite of our sin. In this reception, we are forgiven through the atoning work of Jesus Christ on the cross. The justifying grace cancels our guilt and empowers us to resist the power of sin and to fully love God and neighbor. Today, justifying grace is also known as conversion, "accepting Jesus as your personal Lord and Savior", or being "born again". John Wesley originally called this experience the New Birth. This experience can occur in different ways; it can be one transforming moment, such as an altar call experience, or it may involve a series of decisions across a period of time.

Sanctifying Grace is that grace of God which sustains the believers in the journey toward Christian Perfection: a genuine love of God with heart, soul, mind, and strength, and a genuine love of our neighbors as ourselves. Sanctifying grace enables us to respond to God by leading a Spirit-filled and Christ-like life aimed toward love.

Wesleyan theology maintains that salvation is the act of God's grace entirely, from invitation, to pardon, to growth in holiness. Furthermore, God's prevenient, justifying, and sanctifying grace interact dynamically in the lives of Christians from birth to death. For Wesley, good works were the fruit of one's salvation, not the way in which that salvation was earned. Faith and good works go hand in hand in Methodist theology: a living tree naturally and inevitably bears fruit. Wesleyan theology rejects the doctrine of eternal security, affirming instead a view of conditional security, in which salvation can be lost or renounced. Wesley emphasized that believers must continue to grow in their relationship with Christ, through the process of Sanctification. The articles of faith states: "We believe that glorious and everlasting life is assured to all who savingly believe in, and obediently follow, Jesus Christ our Lord; and that the finally impenitent shall suffer eternally in hell. It further states, "We believe that all persons may fall from grace and apostatize and, unless they repent of their sins, be hopelessly and eternally lost."

=== Historical and contemporary issues ===
The Church of the Nazarene also takes a stance on a wide array of current moral and social issues, which is published in the Manual and online. These issues have included stances regarding human sexuality, theatrical arts, movies, social dancing, AIDS/HIV, and organ donation. On some matters the church is very conservative, such as human sexuality; the church has said that homosexuality is a sin "subject to the wrath of God", and yet its stance on scientific discovery might be considered comparatively liberal.

Consistent with the position of classical Nazarene theologian H. Orton Wiley, several contemporary Nazarene theologians, have endeavored to reconcile the theory of evolution with theology. There are an increasing number of Nazarene scientists who support theistic evolution, among them Karl Giberson, Darrel R. Falk, and Richard G. Colling. The 2009 General Assembly, delegates reaffirmed the Church's existing position after extended debate.

Throughout its history, the Church of the Nazarene has maintained a stance supporting total abstinence from alcohol and any other intoxicant, including cigarettes. Primary Nazarene founder Bresee was active in the Prohibition cause. Although this continues to be debated, the position remains in the church. While the church does not consider alcohol itself to be the cause of sin, it recognizes that intoxication and the like are a 'danger' to many people, both physically and spiritually. Historically, the Nazarene Church was founded in order to help the poor. Alcohol, gambling and the like, and their addictions, were cited as things that kept people poor. So in order to help the poor, as well as everyone else, Nazarenes have traditionally abstained from those things. Also, a person who is meant to serve an example to others should avoid the use of them, in order not to cause others to stray from their "walk with God", as that is considered a sin for both parties.

== Worship and rituals ==
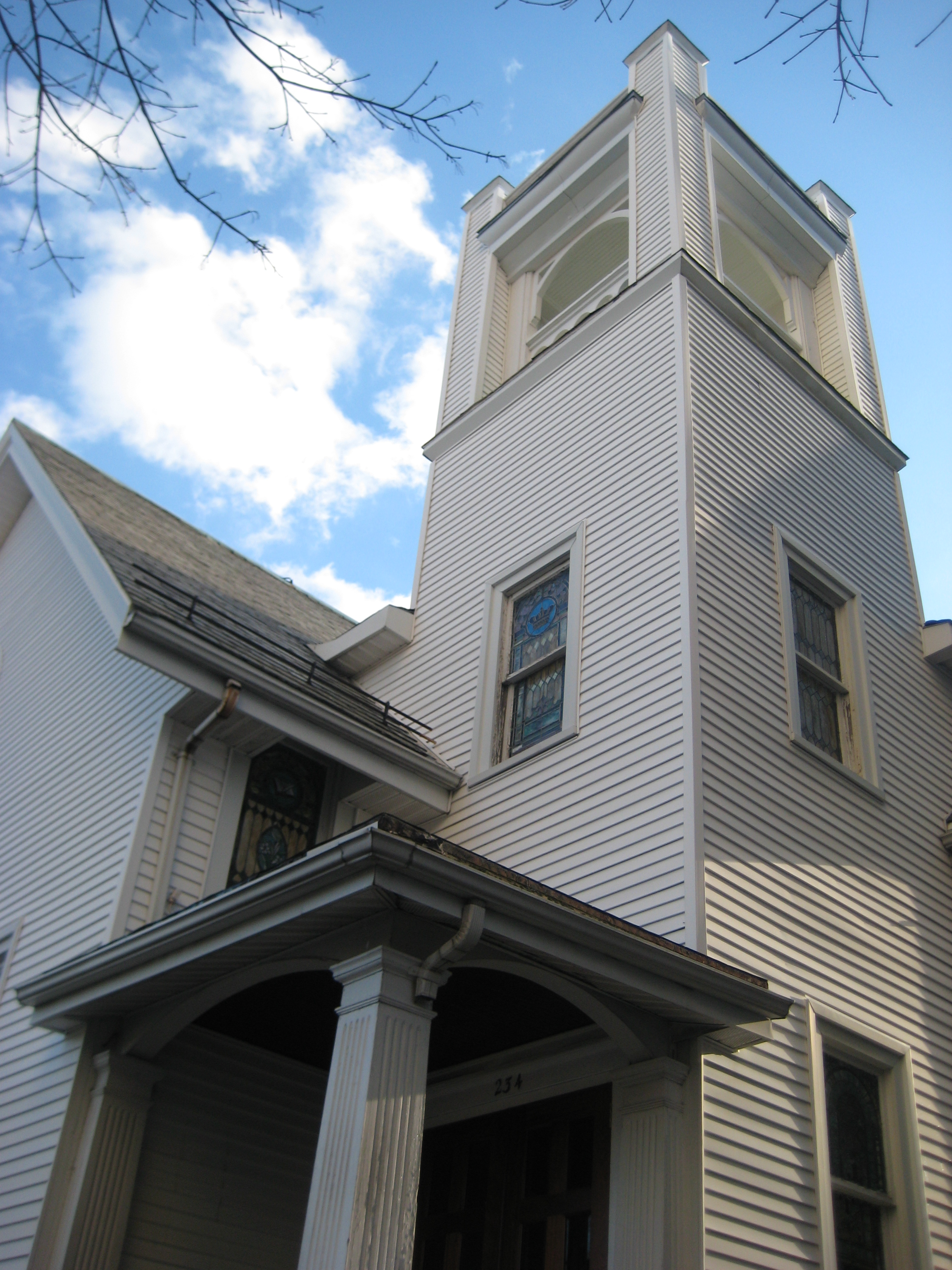
First Church of the Nazarene in Cambridge, Massachusetts

Worship styles vary widely, and are contextual to the local, customs and demographics of the congregations. The Church has a congregational structure so each individual church can create its own schedule and does not follow a united liturgy. In the past, Nazarene Churches had services on Sunday morning, Sunday and Wednesday evenings, each lasting for about an hour to an hour and half. The typical Sunday Morning service included music with hymns with a band and choir or by a 'praise and worship' band, an offering, time for testimony, sermon, and a response (typically an altar call). Service order is viewed to be less structured and rigid and that the Holy Spirit should lead worship.

Sunday and Wednesday evening services in many Nazarene churches have changed from worship services to discipleship training, and many growing churches have utilized weekly small group meetings. Worship services typically contain singing a mix of hymns and contemporary worship songs, prayer, special music, reading of Scripture, sermon, and offering. Services are often focused toward a time of prayer and commitment at the end of the sermon, with people finding spiritual help as they gather for corporate praying.

Over the last twenty years, an increasing number of Nazarene churches have utilized contemporary worship services as their predominant worship style. This may involve the use of a projector to display song and chorus lyrics onto a video screen. More traditional Nazarene churches may have a song leader who directs congregational hymns from the pulpit or platform. More recently, a small number of local churches have adopted a more formal liturgical understanding of worship based on practices from John Wesley's Anglican tradition.

Annual revival meetings have long been a traditional part of Nazarene life, and are still encouraged in the Manual, though may be seen less today than they once were. An evangelist comes to preach the revival services. The Church of the Nazarene licenses and credentials evangelists, many of whom earn their entire living through their ministry of evangelism. Most Nazarene districts also sponsor an annual camp meeting for adults and their families as well as separate camps for both teens and children. While Nazarenes believe that the ill should utilize all appropriate medical agencies, Nazarenes also affirm God's will of divine healing and pastors may "lay hands" upon the ill in prayer, either at the hospital or in a worship service. A prayer for divine healing is never understood as excluding medical services and agencies.

=== Sacraments and rituals ===
The Church of the Nazarene recognizes two sacraments: Christian baptism and the Lord's Supper, or communion. The 2017–2021 Manual included a significantly revised Article XIII on The Lord's Supper.

Nazarenes permit both believer's baptism and infant baptism. When a family in the Church of the Nazarene chooses not to baptize their infants they often participate in an infant dedication. Whether a child is baptized or dedicated is the choice of the parents of the child. This decision is often based on geographic location, and other contextual cultural points of view.

Along with rituals for the two sacraments, the Nazarene Manual also includes rituals for infant dedication, reception of new church members, weddings, funerals, the organization of a local church, the installation of new officers, and church dedications.

== Church polity and leadership ==
The Church of the Nazarene combines episcopal and congregational polities to form a "representative" government. The salient feature of this structure is shared power between people and clergy as well as between the local church and the denomination. At the 1923 General Assembly, the following was stated in relation to the denomination's polity: "Our people have felt they did not want extreme episcopacy in the appointment of pastors, neither did they want extreme congregationalism. In the past, we have tried to find a middle ground, so as to respect the spirit of democracy and at the same time retain a degree of efficiency."

=== General Assembly ===
According to the denominational website, "The General Assembly of the church serves as the supreme doctrine-formulating, lawmaking, and elective authority of the Church of the Nazarene, subject to the provisions of the church constitution." Composed of elected representatives from all of the denomination's districts globally, since 1985 the General Assembly has met once every four years. All General Assemblies have been held in the United States. At the General Assembly held in Orlando, Florida, US, in June 2009, a total of 1,030 delegates were finally registered, with 982 eligible to vote, and 48 non-voting delegates. The General Assembly elects the members of the Board of General Superintendents and considers legislative proposals from the church's 465 districts. Topics under consideration may range from the method of calling a pastor to bioethics.

=== Board of General Superintendents ===
The highest elected office in the Church of the Nazarene is that of General Superintendent. Every four years six ordained elders, who are at least 35 years old and are not over 70 years old, are elected by the General Assembly of the Church of the Nazarene for a four-year term. Both females and males ordained to the order of elders are eligible to be elected to the office of General Superintendent. Of the forty-five persons who have served in this office, only two women have been elected: Nina G. Gunter (2005–2009), and Carla Sunberg, who was elected in 2017 and is currently serving. Until 2005, all of the elders elected were from the United States of America. Crocker, a native of San Jerónimo, Guatemala, the first General Superintendent from Central America, and the 2nd general superintendent elected while residing outside the US/Canada Region, also was elected on a record 53rd ballot. Collectively these six elders constitute the Board of General Superintendents, which is according to the denominational Manual, are "charged with the responsibility of administering the worldwide work of the Church of the Nazarene," and interpret the denomination's of polity. All official acts of the Board of General Superintendents are subject to the review of the General Assembly.

The youngest person elected General Superintendent was Roy T. Williams, who was only 32 when chosen to fill a vacancy caused by the deaths of Phineas F. Bresee and William C. Wilson, both of whom died within weeks of the 1915 General Assembly. Wilson is the shortest-serving General Superintendent, dying only 33 days after his election at the age of 47. R.T. Williams was the longest-serving general superintendent, who served for just over 30 years from January 1916 to his death in March 1946. Eight of the first eleven General Superintendents died in office, resulting in both the expansion in the number of general superintendents, and an upper age limit of 72. Dr Hiram F. Reynolds (1854–1938), one of the original two General Superintendents elected in October 1907, holds the record as the oldest person to serve in this office, retiring in 1932, at the age of 78.

=== General Board ===
The General Board of the Church of the Nazarene was created by action of the 1923 General Assembly to replace a system of independent general boards that often competed with one another for the church budget. These independent boards became departments of the General Board. The General Board is made up of district superintendents, pastors and lay leaders representing the global church and elected by the regional caucuses at General Assembly. Convening in late February each year, the board has governing responsibility for the international Church of the Nazarene between general assemblies. The General Board carries out the corporate business of the denomination. 48 board members represent the church's regions, and an additional four members were elected to represent Education, Nazarene Youth International, and Nazarene Missions International. Of the 52 Board Members roughly half are elected from outside the United States, and only 6 are women.

=== Ministers ===
The Church of the Nazarene has two orders of ordained ministry: the ordained elder and the ordained deacon. The ordained elder is a person, either male or female, who has been set apart for a ministry of "Word and Sacrament". Their primary assignment is to preach the Word, administer the sacraments, and lead the local church. The ordained deacon is a man or woman who has been set apart for full-time ministry in a role other than "Word and Sacrament". Those eligible to be ordained as deacons include those who are called to a full-time ministry of music, Christian social ministry, or director of Christian education, or another ministry that does not typically involve leading a congregation. The church also has district licensed ministers. Usually these are persons who are on the path toward ordination or who are strongly considering a call to ordained ministry. A licensed minister may, in some cases, be the pastor of a church.

The Church of the Nazarene also recognizes these specialized forms of Christian service and ministry. In September 2014, the Church of the Nazarene had 17,017 ordained elders, 838 ordained deacons and 9,847 licensed ministers, for a total of 27,702 credentialed or licensed ministers. On March 24, 2010, the Bangladesh District set a denominational record with 193 women and men ordained in one service, including 30 women, the most ever in the denomination's history, exceeding the 39 ordained in Peru.

=== Local church ===
The basic unit of organization in the Church of the Nazarene is the local church congregation, which may be either an organized church or church-type mission (often known as "New Starts"). At the end of September 2014, there were 21,425 organized churches and a further 7,970 church-type missions, for a total of 29,395 congregations. The average Nazarene congregation globally has 78 members, and an average weekly worship attendance of 51. The largest congregation in the denomination as measured by average weekly attendance each Sunday morning (as of February 2009) was the Central De Campinas church on the Paulista Sudeste district in Brazil, which reported 8,216 members and an average weekly Sunday morning worship attendance of 7,237. During 2009, it received 873 new Nazarenes. The next four largest congregations were the Casa De Oracion Paso Ancho church in Colombia (4,600 members; 7,000 worship); the Americana church in Brazil; Grove City Church of the Nazarene in Grove City, Ohio; and College Church of the Nazarene in Olathe, Kansas.

=== District ===
Local congregations are grouped administratively into geographical districts. Each district is led by a district superintendent, who is usually elected by delegates from each local church in an annual meeting called the District Assembly. In newer districts, the district superintendent may be appointed by the jurisdictional general superintendent. There are currently 465 districts worldwide. Size depends upoon the concentration of Nazarene churches. There are 80 Districts in the US and Canada. The largest districts are Brazil Sudeste Paulista (24,686 full members), South Korea National District (23,143 members), India East (19,490 members), and Oklahoma (17,530), the largest district in the US. Districts may also be sub-divided into Zones where local churches within a Zone may cooperate for various activities, particularly for youth events.

=== Region ===
All Districts of the Church of the Nazarene are organized into 6 geographic regions:

- Africa: 611,398 members, in 8,686 churches in 130 districts in 6 fields in 42 world areas;
- Asia-Pacific: 119,349 members in 1,894 churches in 46 districts in 7 fields in 29 world areas);
- Eurasia: 240,585 members in 7,832 churches in 52 districts in 7 fields in 36 world areas;
- MesoAmerica: 364,368 members in 3,133 churches in 77 districts in 5 fields in 31 world areas;
- South America: 279,408 members in 2,603 churches in 80 districts in 8 fields in 10 world areas;
- USA/Canada (US, Canada, and Bermuda): 649,998 members in 5,247 churches in 80 districts in 9 zones in 3 world areas

The regions are administered through Nazarene Global Mission, an entity formed in 2011 after a strategic restructuring that incorporates all functions of the former World Mission Department. It focuses on partnership and collaboration to help equip Nazarene churches support mission at community, district, regional and international levels.

In the United States and Canada, there are educational zones centered on one of the denominational institutions of higher education. Each local church pays an agreed budget to the District level, and each District remits a portion of the local and district budgets for their zone's Nazarene institution of higher education. Educational zones for the Church of the Nazarene were first established in 1918.

=== Field ===
Districts in areas administered by the Global Mission are often grouped into "fields", with a field strategy co-ordinator providing strategic leadership. In the US and Canada the sub-regional areas may be referred to as "Zones". On January 31, 2008, India became the first field in the global Church of the Nazarene to be entirely indigenous with the field strategy co-ordinator, Rev Sunil Dange, and all 15 district superintendents, all ministry coordinators, and all pastors from India.

== Memberships statistics ==
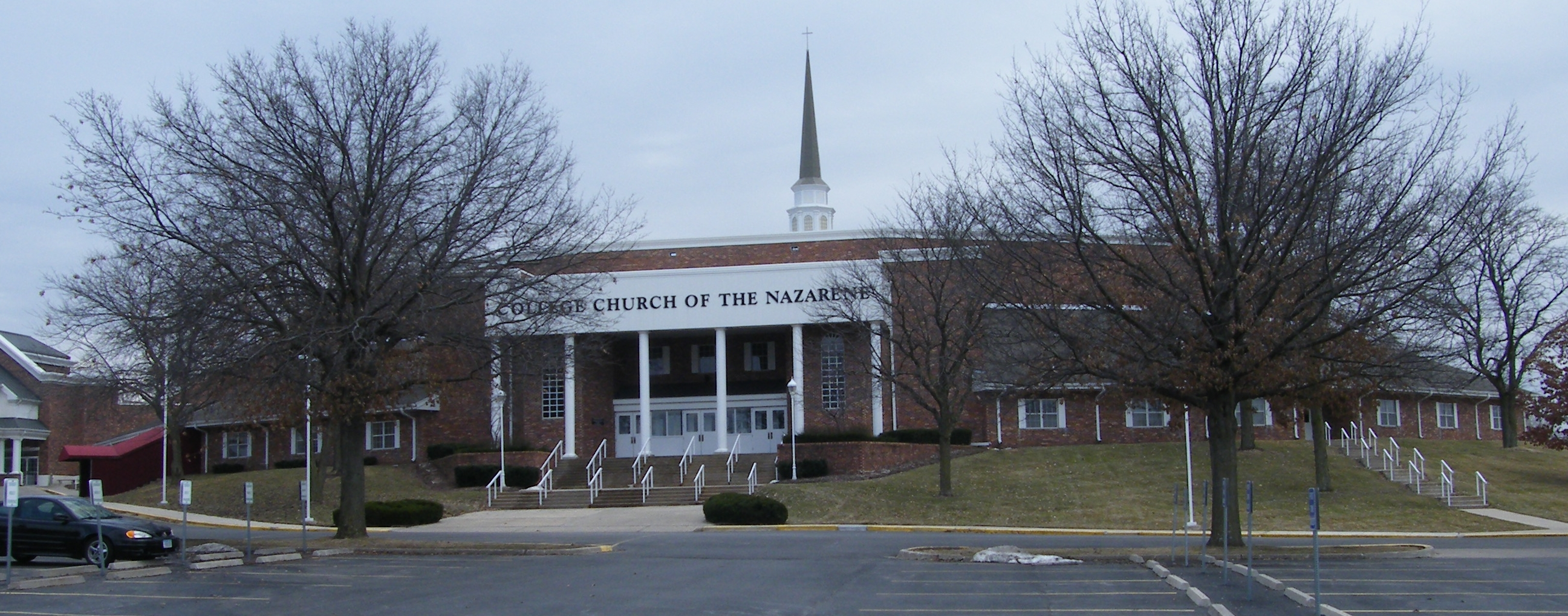
Olathe College Church was the largest Nazarene Church in the world until 2005

The estimated number of members of the Church of the Nazarene was 2,640,216, attended 31,049 congregations worldwide in 2020. The Church crossed 2,000,000 members worldwide in 2010. The Church of the Nazarene makes a distinction between new members who come to the church through a new profession of faith in Christianity, and those entering from another denomination. According to their internal statistical reporting an average of 455 join the Nazarene Church per day. From 2006 to 2016, 139,560 people became new members of the Church of the Nazarene, with 113,968 received by profession of faith and a further 25,592 coming from other denominations. With 626,811 members, the USA was the country with the greatest number of Nazarenes,.

The highest concentration of Nazarene membership is in the United States where 626,811 members constitute 23.26% of the global membership. The Africa region as a whole makes up 27.29%, the USA/CAN region is 25.87% and all other church regions making up 46.84%. The USA/CAN region is the only region to have a decrease in membership since 2000. Nazarene membership in the United States hit its peak in the year 2000. Since 2006, average weekly worship attendance worldwide is 1,150,482, mostly in small congregations, under 100 in attendance, or new churches.

Nation	Total Membership	Increase from 1983–2013
Bangladesh	123,192	68,053
Benin	56,036	45,700
Brazil	153,002	104,737
Ethiopia	50,361	48,304
Guatemala	90,101	63,908
Haiti	134,236	74,262
India	136,079	100,689
Mozambique	202,118	149,778
Peru	67,394	40,723
United States	626,811	130,712

During 2016, Nazarene churches received annual income from all sources of US$860,949,037, a decrease of US$941,336 from 2015, and a 3.79% decadal decrease from the US$894,866,142 reported in September 2006. Worldwide per capita expenses amounted to US$353.04 (a decrease of $198.77 from that reported in 2006).

In 2016, the Church of the Nazarene had the highest percentage presence in the nation of Barbados (where its members constitute 2.84% of the population), Cape Verde (1.54% of the population), Eswatini (1.42% of the population), Haiti (1.34% of the population) Mozambique (0.82% of the population), and Samoa (0.66% of the population). The highest percentage of Nazarene presence in the US occurred in 2000, when there were 2.25 members for every 1,000 US people (0.25%).

=== Denominational affiliations ===
As of 2014, the Church of the Nazarene participates in 8 cross-denominational associations, ecumenical networks, majority of which are pairing with other Wesleyan or evangelical denominations:

- Christian Holiness Partnership
- Global Wesleyan Alliance
- National Association of Evangelicals
- World Methodist Council
- Mission Exchange (formerly the Evangelical Fellowship of Missions Agencies)
- Evangelical Council for Financial Accountability,
- Wesleyan Holiness Consortium
- Wesleyan Holiness Study Project

== Ministries and activities ==
For more than a century, the international denominational headquarters was located in Kansas City, Missouri. Since September 2008, the denomination moved to Lenexa, Kansas and rebranded under the name "Global Ministry Center" The denomination's publishing company was known as Nazarene Publishing House until 2017, and now is (The Foundry Publishing), has been located in Kansas City, Missouri, since its inception in 1912.

There are several key ministries that focus on different aspect of the larger mission statement. The biggest of these are Nazarene Youth International (NYI), Nazarene Discipleship International (NDI), Nazarene Missions International (NMI), and Nazarene Publishing House (NPH).

=== Higher education ===
The Church of the Nazarene owns and operates 52 educational institutions in 35 countries, comprising 5 graduate seminaries; 31 undergraduate Bible/theological colleges; 2 nurses training colleges, and 1 teacher training college. The Manual of the Church of the Nazarene says that "[t]he Church of the Nazarene... has been committed to higher education. The church college/university, while not a local congregation, is an integral part of the church; it is an expression of the church." Nazarene educational institutions are overseen by the Nazarene International Board of Education (IBOE).

A portion of each local church and district budget is allocated for Nazarene higher education, which subsidizes the cost of each educational zone or nation's respective institution. Globally the denomination contributed US$23,904,271 in 2010 to Nazarene educational institutions. In 2016, the combined global enrollment was 51,555 students. Approximately 31,000 students enrolled in on-campus programs and 19,000 students enrolled in extension programs. As of 2010, these educational assets were valued at US$1,041,436,984, with liabilities of US$341,009,574, for a net worth of US$700,427,410.

In the United States and Canada, there is one Nazarene liberal arts college per region. Accompanying that logic of institutional support, there is a gentlemen's agreement between the Nazarene liberal arts colleges in the United States to not actively recruit outside their respective educational zone, requiring that a Nazarene prospective college student must first seek information from any "Off-Region" institution on an individual basis.

The regional colleges are for the Canada Region, Ambrose University in Calgary, Alberta; for the Eastern USA Region, Eastern Nazarene College in Quincy, Massachusetts; for North Central USA Region, MidAmerica Nazarene University in Olathe, Kansas; for the East Central USA Region, Mount Vernon Nazarene University in Mount Vernon, Ohio; for the Northwest USA Region, Northwest Nazarene University in Nampa, Idaho; for the Central USA Region, Olivet Nazarene University in Bourbonnais, Illinois; for the Southwest USA Region, Point Loma Nazarene University in San Diego, California; for the South Central USA Region, Southern Nazarene University in Bethany, Oklahoma; for the Southeast USA Region, Trevecca Nazarene University in Nashville. On July 25, 2024, ENC announced that it would begin the process of closure.

Top University Enrollment
School	Location	2016 Enrollment
Korea Nazarene University	Cheonan, South Korea	5,208
Olivet Nazarene University	Bourbonnais, Illinois	4,670
Africa Nazarene University	Nairobi, Kenya	3,872
Point Loma Nazarene University	San Diego, CA	3,806
Trevecca Nazarene University	Nashville, TN	3,093
Southern Nazarene University	Bethany, OK	2,090

On October 16, 2009, the Global Consortium of Nazarene Graduate Seminaries and Schools of Theology (GCNGSST) was inaugurated in Manchester, England. It comprised the following eight institutions: Africa Nazarene University (Ongata Rongai, Kenya); Asia-Pacific Nazarene Theological Seminary (Taytay, Rizal, Philippines); Brazil Nazarene College (Faculdade Nazarena do Brasil) (Campinas, Brazil); Korea Nazarene University (Cheonan, South Korea); Nazarene Theological College, (Brisbane, Australia); Nazarene Theological College, (Manchester, England); Nazarene Theological Seminary (Kansas City, Missouri); and Seminario Nazareno de las Americas (SENDAS) (San José, Costa Rica). Funded through a grant from the Henry Luce Foundation, the consortium connects Nazarene seminaries by optimizing the global resources available for theological education. While much of the work of the consortium is done throughout the year via video conferencing, subsequent meetings of the presidents and academic deans of the member institutions were held on the campuses of Korean Nazarene University, and Nazarene Theological Seminary.

=== Nazarene Youth International (NYI) ===
Nazarene Youth International is a youth organisation that has partnered with the Church of the Nazarene since its inception as the Nazarene Young Peoples Society (NYPS) in 1923. In 1976, it adopted its current name, and focused on young people aged 12 to 23 (later 12 to 29). In September 2014, NYI membership globally was 422,012 young people aged 14–25 (a decrease of 8,871 from 2013, but an increase of 85,062 or 25.24% since 2004) in 16,597 local organizations.

The NYI-sponsored Third Wave emerging leadership conference was held from January 3–8, 2012 in Bangkok, Thailand, with approximately 250 participants from 55 countries attending.

=== Nazarene Discipleship International (NDI) ===
At the end of 2010, Sunday School and Discipleship Ministries International (SDMI) reported an average global Sunday School weekly attendance of 703,344, and the Global Discipleship Group attendance was 191,912, for a total of 895,256 (an increase of 52,132 from 2009). The Total Global Responsibility List was 1,690,255 in 2009. In 2016, the Global Discipleship attendance was 1,245,818; a decadal growth rate of 55%. The total global responsibility lists was 1,845,786. In 2022, there was a need to better align SDMI with the new denominational focus on Nazarene Discipleship as a Journey of Grace. It was at this time that SDMI was rebranded as Nazarene Discipleship International (NDI).

=== Nazarene Missions International (NMI) ===
Nazarene Missions International (NMI) was founded in 1915 at the fourth General Assembly, as the Nazarene Foreign Missionary Society, with Susan Norris Fitkin, wife of financier Abram Fitkin, elected the first president. Fitkin remained in office until June 1948. NMI is "the church-relations heart of World Mission within each local church", and "the local-church-based global mobilization and promotional arm of the Church of the Nazarene". has 916,470 members. The purpose of NMI is to mobilize churches in mission through praying, discipling, giving, and educating.

==== Missions ====
The Church of the Nazarene has been committed to obeying the Great Commission since its inception. According to the 2013–2017 Manual, "Historically, Nazarene global ministry has centered around evangelism, compassionate ministry, and education." In 2014, the denomination had a total of 702 salaried missionaries (funded by the World Evangelism Fund for the Church of the Nazarene) in 40 world areas, of whom, forty percent of General Board missionaries were non-U.S. missionaries. Additionally, there were contracted volunteers serving as missionaries in 40 world areas. In 2013, 687 missionaries and 231 missionary kids were deployed from 27 world areas (including 313 Mission Corps volunteers). In 2014, Nazarene missionaries originated from 35 different world areas. 10,824 volunteers participated in mission in 2013. In addition to Mission Corps, there were 292 individual volunteers, and 10,219 Work & Witness team members. In 2010, 92 Youth in Mission participants served in 14 world areas, including 52 participants from outside the US/Canada Regions.

From a peak of $54 million given for the World Evangelism Fund (WEF) in 2002, as a consequence of the 2008 financial crisis, the total amount raised for the World Evangelism Fund in 2012 was approximately US$38.3 million (a decrease of $0.5 million from the previous year). However, Mission Specials receipted were an additional US$26.1 million, a decrease of US$5.3 million from the previous year. This combined giving totaled US$64.4 million, a decrease of $5.8 million. Despite its membership being less than 33% of the denominational total, the USA regions contributed 94% of WEF funding, and 90% of Approved Specials. During 2012, 27.7% of Nazarene congregations gave the recommended 5.5% of total income to the WEF, an additional 37.5% of congregations made some contribution to the WEF, while 35% of congregations made no contribution.

==== JESUS Film Harvest Partners ====
The Church of the Nazarene is an active participant in the Jesus Film Project, organizing teams to show the Jesus film. In 2014, Global Mission (GM) and JESUS Film Harvest Partners (JFHP) has 619 JESUS Film teams working with missionaries and local leaders, spreading the gospel in 290 languages and in 135 world areas. The cumulative total from 1998 to June 2014 is 67,280,854 evangelistic contacts with a reported 12,640,017 decisions made for Christ (18.8 percent of contacts) and 5,261,310 (41.6 percent of decisions) initial discipleship follow-ups. Since 1998, 43,481 new preaching points were started. The most current information is available on the jfhp.org website.

==== Work and Witness ====
Since its inception in 1974, Work and Witness, an endeavor that sends teams of volunteers into cross-cultural situations primarily to construct buildings on the mission field, has 196,060 participants who have given 13,246,196 labor hours, which equals 6,564 years of labor. In 2010, there were 537 Work & Witness teams with a total of 8,955 participants. In 2008 teams served in 72 world areas.

=== Nazarene Compassionate Ministries ===
The Church of the Nazarene has 245 full-time compassionate ministries centers and volunteer efforts around the world. Nazarenes have been instrumental in assisting people in every part of the globe who have been affected by war, famine, hurricane, flood, and other natural and human-made disasters. In 2008, Nazarene Compassionate Ministries' Child Development program had 123 Child Development Centers globally that provided more than 11,140 sponsorships in 77 countries, and met the needs of more than 50,000 children through nutritional programs. The church operates 64 medical clinics and hospitals worldwide. In 2010, 11,874 children were fed each week through Nazarene Compassionate Ministries.

=== Nazarene Publishing House (NPH) ===
Nazarene Publishing House (NPH), also called Foundry Publishing, the publishing arm of the Church of the Nazarene, is the largest publisher of Wesleyan-Holiness literature in the world. NPH prints more than 25 million pieces of literature each year. NPH processes more than 250,000 orders each year from more than 11,000 churches.

The Third General Assembly of the Church of the Nazarene held in Nashville in 1911 recommended that the infant denomination's three publishing companies (then located in Rhode Island, Texas, and Los Angeles) each founded by a different Nazarene parent body, consolidate into "one central publishing company" and merge their three papers into one strong paper. The newly created Pentecostal Nazarene Publishing House was sited at 2923 Troost Avenue, Kansas City, Missouri, in 1912, with Clarence J. Kinne, a Nazarene ordained minister, as its first manager. The Herald of Holiness, the new weekly paper, edited by B. F. Haynes, appeared for the first time on Wednesday, April 17, 1912. The Other Sheep (later World Mission) magazine began publication in 1913 under founding editor Charles Allen McConnell, who was NPH manager from 1916 to 1918. Both magazines were published until 1999, when they were discontinued in favor of Holiness Today, a new publication. In the meantime, Spanish, Portuguese, and French editions of Herald of Holiness appeared over the years.

NPH is a separate corporate entity from General Church of the Nazarene, although it is accountable to the church. NPH has a board of directors and is also accountable to one of the six General Superintendents of the Church of the Nazarene who has oversight of NPH. NPH publishes a variety of books, music and materials. The primary label under which books are published is Beacon Hill Press. Sunday school curriculum is published under the label Word Action. Youth ministry resources are published under the label Barefoot Ministries. Spanish materials are produced by Casa Nazarena de Publicaciones.

Music and drama resources are published under the label Lillenas Publishing, which was founded in Indianapolis, Indiana, in 1925 by Nazarene minister and composer Haldor Lillenas, and subsequently purchased by NPH in 1930.

== Notable Nazarenes ==
The following are notable people who have past or current affiliation or membership in the Church of the Nazarene.

=== Current Nazarenes ===
- South African politician Rev. William Bantom
- Novelist Donna Fletcher Crow
- Psychologist James Dobson.
- Politician and academic Kent R. Hill.
- Gospel singer Crystal Lewis.
- Mexican politician Pablo Salazar Mendiguchía.
- Philanthropist Esther R. Sanger.
- Scottish businessman Brian Souter
- Computer programmer Larry Wall.
- Politician Vince Snowbarger
- Author and historian Randall Stephens
- Pastor Aguiar Valvassoura

=== Former Nazarenes ===
- Politician Edwin Edwards, converted to Roman Catholicism.
- American investment banker and philanthropist Abram Fitkin
- scientist Robert W. Faid
- Convicted murderer Caril Ann Fugate, girlfriend of spree killer Charles Starkweather
- singer and songwriter Bill Gaither, as an adult attends the Church of God.
- actor Tom Hanks, attended a Nazarene church as a teenager, along with Roman Catholic and LDS Churches. Greek Orthodox as an adult.
- American politician Gary Hart, raised in a Nazarine church;
- police chief and boxer Tunney Hunsaker
- Haitian-American musician Wyclef Jean
- author R. T. Kendall, who resigned due to Calvinistic convictions he felt conflicted with Nazarene beliefs.
- American artist Thomas Kinkade;
- Author and hymn writer Haldor Lillenas
- Musician John Mellencamp;
- Actor Ron Raines was active in the denomination until at least 1969.
- Actress Debbie Reynolds;
- American philanthropist Bob Pierce;
- Canadian religious leader Charles Templeton, became an agnostic
- music publisher James David Vaughan.
- Japanese artist and author Kappa Senoo.
- Dorothy Davis Cook, nurse and educator

== See also ==
- List of Church of the Nazarene schools
- List of Church of the Nazarene conventions
- Nazarene Hymnals
- Nazarene Missionaries
- Nazarene Youth United Kingdom
