= Donald Owens =

American Christian leader

Dr. Donald Owens Ph.D., D.D., M.A., B.Th., A.B.
- General Superintendent emeritus
- Church: Church of the Nazarene
- Other posts: General Superintendent; 2nd President, MANC; 1st President, APNTS; Professor, NTS; Professor, BNC; 1st President, KNU

Orders
- Ordination: 1952

Personal details
- Born: September 12, 1926 (age 100) Marionville, Missouri, U.S.
- Denomination: Church of the Nazarene
- Parents: Emery Owens; Mary Elizabeth Russell Owens
- Spouse: Adeline Lois Preuss Owens
- Profession: minister, missionary, educator, administrator, anthropologist
- Education: Bethany-Peniel College

Donald Dean Owens (born September 12, 1926) is an American general superintendent emeritus in the Church of the Nazarene, and also a retired ordained minister, missionary, professor, and seminary and college president. Owens is the founding president of the forerunner of Korea Nazarene University (then in Seoul, Korea), and Asia-Pacific Nazarene Theological Seminary in Taytay, Rizal, Philippines (1983–1984), and served as the pioneer missionary for the Church of the Nazarene in the Republic of Korea (1954–1966), and as a missionary for four years in the Philippines (1981–1985), where he was the first Regional Director of both the Asia Region (1981–1985) and the South Pacific Region (1981–1983) of the Church of the Nazarene. Owens was the 2nd President of MidAmerica Nazarene College in Olathe, Kansas, for 4 years from 1985. In June 1989 Owens was elected the 28th General Superintendent of the Church of the Nazarene, and after being re-elected in 1993, served until his retirement in June 1997.

Owens is the author of four books: Challenge in Korea (1957), Church Behind the Bamboo Curtain (1973), Revival Fires in Korea (1977), and Sing Ye Islands (1979); and several scholarly articles. Owens was a professor at Korea Nazarene Theological College, Bethany Nazarene College in Bethany, Oklahoma, and at Nazarene Theological Seminary in Kansas City, Missouri. Owens pastored Nazarene churches in Fairbury, Nebraska (1952–1954) and Bethany, Oklahoma, where he was the pioneer pastor of the Lake Overholser Church (1968–1969).

== Early life and education ==
Owens was born on September 12, 1926 in Marionville, Missouri, the fourth of the five children, and third son of Emery Owens (born June 22, 1889, in Mount Vernon, Missouri; died 1970 in California), a farm laborer who did odd jobs, and who had been a miner; and Mary Elizabeth Russell Owens (born April 30, 1893, in Missouri; died October 1968 in Oklahoma City, Oklahoma). His only sister was Neva M. Owens (born 1913 in Missouri), who was born soon after her parents' wedding on August 5, 1912, in Lawrence County, Missouri. Owens' three brothers were Raymond E. Owens (born about 1918 in Missouri); Norman James Robert Owens (born June 14, 1924, in South Haven, Kansas; died June 27, 2004, in Caldwell, Idaho); and Denny Gene Owens (born February 7, 1934, in Carthage, Missouri; died February 22, 2000, in Oklahoma City, Oklahoma), who later was a missionary for the Church of the Nazarene in the Philippines for 12 years between 1965 and 1982, where he pastored in Manila, was district superintendent of the Eastern Visayan district and was president of Visayan Nazarene Bible College (1979–1980), then located in Iloilo City; was president of Nazarene Indian Bible College in Albuquerque, New Mexico. and based in Guam as the pioneer District Superintendent of the Micronesia District from 1994.

By 1930 Owens and his parents and three siblings were living on a farm in Marion township in Jasper County, Missouri, near Carthage, Missouri. By 1940, Owens' parents had divorced, and Owens and his mother, and his brothers Norman and Denny, and their maternal grandfather, James M. Russell (born 1862 in Tennessee) were living at 1605 S. Aurora Street in Stockton, California. Owens attended Stockton High School (California) but left before graduation. While still a high school student, Owens indicated that he was converted to Christ in Joplin, Missouri, in August 1944, a month prior to his eighteenth birthday.

Owens enlisted in the US Army at Fort Leavenworth, Kansas, on January 20, 1945. Owens was stationed in the Philippines and Japan, and was discharged honorably in 1946, having reached the rank of sergeant. During 1946 Owens completed his high school studies through passing the GED test.

Owens indicated that he experienced entire sanctification in December 1946 in Joplin, Missouri.

=== Bethany-Peniel College (1947–1952) ===
With the financial assistance provided by the provisions of the G.I. Bill, Owens enrolled in the Bachelor of Arts program at the Church of the Nazarene's Bethany-Peniel College (BPC) in Bethany, Oklahoma, in 1947. While studying at BPC, Owens met his future wife, Adeline Lois Preuss (born March 3, 1930, in Augusta, Kansas), where they were both members of the Class of 1951. Owens was the president of the Junior Class, while Adeline was class treasurer; was on the Dorm Council in 1949, while Adeline was its secretary; was vice-president of the Student Council (1950); in 1949 and 1950 was elected to the Men's B Club, BPC's male varsity letter organization for "those athletes showing outstanding ability", and was vice-president in 1949; was a member of both the Sophomore, and then the Junior varsity football team, that won the school football championship; a member of the Junior Boys' Softball team; a member of the A Cappella Choir; a member of the Christmas Chorus, which performed George Frederic Handel's oratorio "The Messiah". a member of the Gospel Team that provided opportunities for personal evangelism, Christian service, and arranged special meetings for students to preach or sing; and of the Prayer and Fasting League in 1949 and 1950, that met for an hour each Friday at noon to pray and fast. Additionally, Owens took a few missions courses at BPC.

Towards the end of Owens' senior year at BNC, from April 1, 1951, there was "a remarkable revival" through two weeks of evangelistic services at the Bethany First Church of the Nazarene featuring the preaching of Nazarene evangelist Russell V. DeLong. According to Dorli Gschwandtner:

[T]he first service was filled with God's spirit and many people were stirred (instead of having several days of warm up). There were services every morning and every night. The altar could almost not accommodate all the people that came to the front in every single service. On the first night, the evangelist had a chest in which everybody put his or her prayer requests. At the end of the revival there was a great burning of prayer requests, of which many had been answered. The Tuesday morning service went for three hours and found about 125 people at the altar. On Wednesday morning the service went yet another hour longer. People ventured out into Bethany and began inviting seriously to the meetings. Attendance numbers kept rising, so much that children had to sit on the floor and the auditorium could not hold all the people. More and more people came to the front, the services went longer and longer. On that Sunday, Sunday school attendance reached a record 1624. During the service, 150 people and more made it to the altar.

Owens married Adeline Lois Preuss on May 30, 1951. Owens graduated with a B.A. in June 1951. Owens returned to BNC for an additional year, and graduated with a Bachelor of Theology in June 1952.

== Career ==
=== Pastor, Fairbury Church of the Nazarene (1952–1953) ===
After graduation from Bethany-Peniel College in 1952, Owens became the pastor of the Church of the Nazarene in Fairbury, Nebraska, where he served until 1953. Owens was ordained as an elder in the Church of Nazarene by the Nebraska District in 1952.

While pastoring at Fairbury, Owens and his wife Adeline applied to become missionaries for the Church of the Nazarene in 1952. After recommendation by Dr. Remiss Rehfeldt, the Executive Secretary of Nazarene Foreign Missions (1948–1960), the Owenses were approved by the General Board for general missionary assignment in February 1953.

After the signing of the Korean Armistice Agreement in Panmunjom on July 27, 1953, by the United Nations Command, supported by the United States, the North Korean People's Army, and the Chinese People's Volunteers, which resulted in an armistice on the Korean peninsula, the Owenses were assigned to the Republic of Korea. In 1949, the Owenses had heard Korean Nazarene evangelist Rev. Nam Soo "Robert" Chung (sometimes Chung Nahm Su) (born November 9, 1895, near Pyongyang; died July 1, 1965, near Claremont, California), the "Billy Sunday of Korea", the first Nazarene missionary to Korea and the chairman of the Korea's Nazarene "Native Missionary Council", who had studied at Asbury College (1916–1925), speak in the chapel of Bethany-Peniel College. Consequently, faculty and students of BPC, including Adeline who was a member of the college's missionary band, raised about US$6,200 for the work of the Church of the Nazarene in Korea, which had recommenced in October 1948. During their preparation period, Owens was in frequent contact with Chung.

=== Missionary to the Republic of Korea (1954–1966) ===
Don and Adeline Owens were the pioneer foreign missionaries for the Church of the Nazarene in the Republic of Korea, but were initially under the authority of Chung Nam Soo. On May 29, 1954, the Owenses arrived in Seoul, South Korea, where they stayed with Chung and his wife and three children for the next two months. A week after his arrival, Owens preached his first sermon in Korea, which Chung interpreted, and 30 people responded to his invitation to pray.

While learning the Korean language, by August 1954 Owens and Chung registered the "Church of the Nazarene in Korea", with Chung as chairman; helped resolve property issues with the Church of God (Anderson, Indiana) mission in Korea; and to organize the repair of existing churches, and the construction of chapels and parsonages for house churches. Later in August 1954, Chung left abruptly for the USA for an urgent eye operation, appointing Park Ki Suh (sometimes rendered Kee-Suh Park) as acting chairman of the corporate board, causing some leadership difficulties, "making it difficult for Owens to assume any leadership role", as the Korean pastors were "outwardly cooperative, but still independent-minded.". Despite his frustrations caused by the uncertainty of his role, Owens, influenced by the missiological theories of John Livingstone Nevius, Henry Venn, and Rufus Anderson, pioneers of the "three self" indigenous church mission theory that advocated the indigenization of the church, was committed to allowing the Koreans to build their own church. Consequently, Owens continued to work on the tasks assigned to him by Chung and Rehfeldt.

After a visit by Rehfeldt to Korea early in 1955 for a preachers' meeting, it was decided to officially organize the Korea District and to allow the delegates to elect the district superintendent (DS), with the expectation that the DS would be a Korean. In fact, the Nazarene Department of Foreign Missions indicated that it would allow the election of an unordained pastor should the district assembly desire. Rehfeldt discouraged the consideration of Owens, and Owens agreed and was willing for Park, the only ordained pastor, to be elected, despite reservations about his lack of English and lack of knowledge of Nazarene polity and procedures. In preparation for the first District Assembly for the Korea District to be held in August 1955, Owens oversaw the publication and dissemination of Chung's Korean translation of the Manual, the denomination's authoritative guide containing its official statement of the beliefs, practices, and polity. Additionally, in mid-July 1955 Owens organized a three-day workshop to instruct the pastors in the basics of Nazarene polity, held in conjunction with evening services that produced "times of spiritual blessing." As Chung had decided not to return to Korea but rather to retire to Florida, Rehfeldt ruled that he was ineligible to be considered for district superintendent unless he returned to Korea for the district assembly.

The first district assembly of the Korea District was held in Seoul on August 10, 1955, and was chaired by Owens. Despite Owens' reluctance to be district superintendent, he and Park were nominated by the delegates. In each of the four ballots held, Park had a majority of the 22 votes, but was unable to secure the necessary two-thirds majority to be elected. The delegates moved that "since Rev. Owens was a candidate, he should relinquish the chair and allow a Korean to preside." Rev. Sohn, Eung-sun was appointed chair. In the ensuing ballot, Owens was elected.') Owens reported that in keeping with the Nazarene Mission Policy, any election must be approved by the Department of Foreign Missions. after the district assembly he referred the matter to Rehfeldt, writing in November 1955: "Personally, we have no desire to be superintendent here, and recommend to the department ... that Brother Park be appointed to this position." While awaiting a decision from headquarters, Owens consulted Park on administrative matters and established with him a solid working relationship.

In January 1956, Park was appointed district superintendent by the Board of General Superintendents, but Owens was now considered to be the "missionary in charge", with Park to refer all problems to Owens rather than directly to Nazarene headquarters in Kansas City.

==== President of Korea Nazarene Bible College (1954–1966) ====
Owens and Adeline had the primary responsibility to establish a Bible Training School in Seoul, where they would both train prospective pastors in the theology and polity of the Church of the Nazarene. After developing a three-year curriculum, in September 1954, Owens opened the Bible Training School in Seoul in a rehabilitated fire-gutted former missionary two-story house, with 23 students, 8 of whom were already pastors. Owens was president and he and Adeline were the only teachers, but with the assistance of Jun Yoon-kyu as interpreter. The Owenses were both on the Board of Trustees with two Korean pastors and two Korean lay persons. In 1956 two Koreans became faculty members.

Due to the growth in enrollment and the inadequacy of the existing facilities, in 1956 Owens began searching for a new location for the Training School, and early in 1957 he found a 21-acre site west of Seoul near the US Air Force base at Kimpo, which was purchased for US$5,000 with funds from the denomination's Alabaster fund. In June 1957, another American missionary couple was added to the College faculty. On April 1, 1958, the first graduating class of five completed their studies at the Training School. In the summer of 1958 the Seoul property was sold, and construction of the nine buildings of the new college at Kimpo was started, with classes at the new location for the renamed Korea Nazarene Bible College (KNBC) starting in the first week of January 1959.

The Owenses returned to the United States in late 1959 for their first furlough, which involved almost twelve months of conducting deputation services throughout the nation.

The Owenses returned to the United States for their second year-long furlough in 1965, and decided to accept the offer to become a professor at Bethany Nazarene College, where he could also earn a Master of Arts degree.

=== Professor, Bethany Nazarene College (1966–1974) ===
From 1966 to 1974 Owens was professor of missiology at Bethany Nazarene College (BNC) (formerly Bethany-Peniel College). While teaching at BNC, in 1967 Owens submitted a thesis entitled "Indigenous Church Principles as a Possible Solution for the Unfinished Task of Missions" as partial requirement for the Master of Arts degree in cultural anthropology; and founded the Lake Overholser Church of the Nazarene in Bethany, Oklahoma, in 1968, where he continued until the following year. In 1970 Owens completed all the requirements for the MA, and subsequently enrolled in a Ph.D. program in cultural anthropology and Asian studies at the University of Oklahoma at Norman, Oklahoma.

==== Missionary, Korea (1971–1972) ====
Due to "the emergence of strong but unyeilding personalities among the national [Korean] church leaders [that] created crosscurrents of criticism and disloyalty that adversely affected the work" in Korea, after an investigative trip to Korea, in 1971 General Superintendent Orville Jenkins and Foreign Missions Executive Secretary Dr. Everette S. Phillips decided to invite the Owenses return to Korea for a short-term assignment to allow the extrication of several missionaries who had been caught in the crossfire and facilitate reconciliation. Under the leadership of Owens there was reconciliation, and a spiritual renewal that created "a healing wave that not only restored peace and confidence but set the church off on a new sweep of revival and expansion."

=== Professor, Nazarene Theological Seminary (1974–1981) ===
From 1974 Owens was professor of missions at Nazarene Theological Seminary in Kansas City, Missouri, serving until 1981. While teaching at Nazarene Theological Seminary, Owens submitted a dissertation, "Korean Shamanism: Its Components, Context, and Functions", and earned a Ph.D. in cultural anthropology in 1975 from the University of Oklahoma at Norman, Oklahoma.

On January 19, 1977, the General Board of the Church of the Nazarene approved the establishment of a graduate-level seminary (initially called Far East Nazarene Theological Seminary) for the Asia and Pacific regions, and elected Owens as President. In August and again in December 1977, Owens and Jerald Johnson were part of a small team that visited the Philippines in order to find a site for the Seminary. Owens and Johnson chose the present location, the former Children's Garden Orphanage on Ortigas Avenue, Kaytikling, Taytay, Rizal. At that time, Owens targeted mid-1978 for the opening of the school.

In December 1979 Owens was appointed as one of the five members of the REAP (Resource for Evangelism And Projects) team that was established to "train and indoctrinate new groups who expressed a desire to unite with the Church of the Nazarene." Beginning in February 1980, the REAP team provided up to three weeks of intensive training in Nazarene doctrine, organization, and administration in both South India and Nigeria. Despite plans to enter other world areas, the program was discontinued by mid-1980.

In January 1980 Owens and Dr. Willard Taylor, the Dean of NTS, were the first professors to hold graduate level classes on the site of APNTS, when extension classes of NTS were held on the newly purchased property. Owens organised two seminars each January for the following two years on the Kaytikling campus.

=== Regional Director, Asia Region (1981–1985) ===
In June 1981 Owens was elected Regional Director of the newly created Asia Region of the Church of the Nazarene, which then included India, Taiwan, Hong Kong, Japan, Korea, and the Philippines; and also of the newly created South Pacific Region, which included Australia, New Zealand, Papua New Guinea, Samoa, and Indonesia. As Regional Director, Owens was responsible for administering both the Asia and South Pacific regions. Owens and his wife moved to Manila in the summer of 1981, and established the regional office in the suburb of Greenhills, San Juan, Metro Manila.

Additionally, Owens was tasked with the responsibility of establishing in Manila the denomination's second graduate-level seminary on a site that had already been purchased in Taytay, Rizal. However, due to the demands of establishing the new seminary, in 1982 Owens requested that he be relieved of some of his responsibilities, resulting in the January 1983 appointment of Rev. Darrell Teare, District Superintendent of the Hawaii District since 1979, as the Regional Director of the South Pacific Region.

During his term as Regional Director, Owens was part of a group that was permitted to visit the former Nazarene mission field centered on Daming in Hebei in the People's Republic of China in November 1982. Additionally, the first Asian Regional Conference was in Seoul, Korea on April 12–14, 1983; the Church of the Nazarene entered Myanmar in June 1983; and the Philippines Central Luzon District reached financial self-support and became a Regular District in 1985.

When Owens resigned as Regional Director of the Asia Region in June 1985, he was succeeded in November 1985 by Rev. George Rench, a missionary to Indonesia since 1971, who had served previously as a missionary in Taiwan (1959–1971).

==== President, APNTS (1983–1984) ====
While continuing to serve as Regional Director, Owens became the founding president of Asia-Pacific Nazarene Theological Seminary in Taytay, Rizal.

When both Filipino and General church leaders (including World Mission director L. Guy Nees) in 1981 urged the sale of the Kaytikling property and the relocation of the Seminary to the campus of Luzon Nazarene Bible College in La Trinidad, Benguet near the northern city of Baguio, Owens, influenced by the missiology of Donald McGavran firmly resisted this idea, arguing: "We should not move away from the masses" believing the seminary should maintain an urban orientation. Owens also advocated that the Seminary should not be an extension of NTS, and that it should develop a resident and increasingly Asian and Pacific faculty, which could apply the church's theology to the contexts of the students. By August 1982, it was decided that the Seminary would remain under the Division of World Mission, with only fraternal relations with NTS. On the recommendation of Owens, on September 22, 1982, the World Mission Division officially renamed the school Asia-Pacific Nazarene Theological Seminary, and five days later the Board of General Superintendents approved the faculty that Owens had nominated.

On January 6, 1983, the seminary was formally named Asia-Pacific Nazarene Theological Seminary and established as an autonomous graduate school of theology, with Owens confirmed as President. At that time, General Superintendent William M. Greathouse was involved in the ground-breaking ceremony for a two-story administration building (later named Owens Hall), which would house the library, class rooms, chapel, and administration offices. In August 1983 APNTS received approval from the Commission on Immigration of the Philippine government to offer courses for non-immigrant students for degrees ranging from Bachelor of Theology to Master of Divinity to Doctor of Ministry, although it transpired that this approval gave it no official standing with the same government's Department of Education. Owens chose the motto of the school, "Bridging cultures for Christ," and also the school hymn, "In Christ There is No East or West.".

On November 14, 1983, the first classes of APNTS commenced, with Owens teaching the missions classes. The faculty was installed and the chapel dedicated on January 15, 1984, by General Superintendent Dr. Eugene L. Stowe and World Mission director Dr. L. Guy Nees.

As Owens felt that the demands of being both Regional Director of the Asia Region and President of APNTS was too much, he resigned from the presidency of APNTS early in 1984. In September 1984 Owens was succeeded by Dr. E. Lebron Fairbanks, previously academic dean of European Nazarene Bible College located in Büsingen, Germany, whom had been elected by the Board of General Superintendents in April 1984.

=== President, MidAmerica Nazarene College (1985–1989) ===
Following the decision of founding President R. Curtis Smith to retire after 19 years, on July 18, 1985, the Board of Trustees elected Owens as the 2nd president of MidAmerica Nazarene College (now University) in Olathe, Kansas, following the decision of first choice Paul G. Cunningham, the pastor of College Church of the Nazarene in Olathe, Kansas, to decline election to remain in the pastorate. At the time of Owens' election, the enrollment at MANC had dropped each year from a high of 1386 in 1983 down to 1008 in 1986.

From 1985 to 1989, Owens chaired the Commission on Internationalization of the Church of the Nazarene.

=== General Superintendent, Church of the Nazarene (1989–1997) ===
At the 22nd General Assembly of the Church of the Nazarene in Indianapolis, Indiana, on June 28, 1989, Owens was elected to a four-year term as one of the six General Superintendents of the Church of the Nazarene, the 28th person to hold the highest elected office in the Church of the Nazarene. After being re-elected in 1993, Owens served for another four years as a General Superintendent until he retired in June 1997.

== Later years ==
At the time of his compulsory retirement as a General Superintendent in June 1997, the delegates of the 24th General Assembly in San Antonio, Texas, voted to declare him General Superintendent emeritus. Towards the end of 1997 Owens deposited his papers with the Nazarene Archives then in Kansas City, Missouri.

Owens and his wife Adeline lived in Bethany, Oklahoma from 1998 until 2003, at which time they relocated to Olathe, Kansas.

On Sunday November 9, 2008, Owens was the preacher in the service held at the Yu Kwan Soon Memorial Stadium in Cheonan, South Korea, to celebrate the 60th anniversary of the Church of the Nazarene in Korea, and the 100th anniversary of the denomination. In his message, Owens challenged the 7,000 Korean Nazarenes gathered to "see past accomplishments as mile markers on the road to even greater days ahead", and reminded them that Nazarenes are a Christian, a Holiness, and a Missional people."

== Awards and honors ==
Owens' alma mater Bethany-Peniel College (now Southern Nazarene University) twice awarded its “B” award to him in 1949 and 1950. Additionally, in 1965 Bethany Nazarene College named Owens the Outstanding Alumnus for that year. SNU now awards the Dr. Don Owens Scholarship, which was established and funded by former students Owens, and is given to those in the SNU Ministerial Internship program. Both Owens and his wife Adeline are listed on SNU's Wall of Missions.

In 1981 Owens was honored with the Nazarene Theological Seminary’s service award. In 1985 Owens was the recipient of the Citation of Merit award as an outstanding educator in the Church of the Nazarene. In 1997 Owens received honorary doctor of divinity degrees from both MidAmerica Nazarene University (MNU) and Mount Vernon Nazarene College (MVNU). MNU offers the Don and Adeline Owens Missionary Scholarship to deserving students.

In recognition of Owen's role in founding Asia-Pacific Nazarene Theological Seminary, in 1991 the administration building on the campus of APNTS was christened Owens Hall, and dedicated by Owens' youngest brother, Rev. Denny G. Owens. In conjunction with the 20th anniversary of APNTS, Owens spoke at the commencement service on April 3, 2004, and APNTS Board of Trustees chair Rev. Steve Walsh announced in April 2004 that the BOT had awarded Owens the title President emeritus of Asia-Pacific Nazarene Theological Seminary; and had voted to establish the Donald Owens School of World Mission, with the vision of APNTS becoming the premier missionary training centre of the Church of the Nazarene. In September 2004 Owens wrote of the decision to name the School of World Mission after him:

"I am honored that my name is being associated with it. People continue to think more of me than I deserve. I am deeply grateful for the pilgrimage that Mrs. Owens and I have shared together."

The APNTS BOT also voted to inaugurate the Donald Owens Lectures in Missiology. Owens gave the inaugural Owens lectures September 21–23, 2004, on the campus of APNTS.

During the dedication of the Church of the Nazarene's new Global Ministry Center (GMC) on Sunday, February 22, 2009, in Lenexa, Kansas, Centennial Heritage Awards were presented to Don and Adeline Owens, along with other General Superintendents emereti and their spouses.

To honor Owens as its founding president, in March 2009 Korea Nazarene University inaugurated Owens International College, an all-English program in international business, that has the aim of "cultivating Christians to be ready for the challenges of globalization." In connection with its 55th anniversary, on September 9, 2009, KNU held a groundbreaking ceremony for the proposed Owens International College (OIC) building on the campus of KNU. On November 1, 2010, KNU dedicated and named its newly completed international hall in honor of Don and Adeline Owens, who are considered the founders of KNU. The Owens International Hall, which consists of two structures joined by a bridge with a patio section, has seven levels, houses KNU's program for international relations and business, and the university's admissions office. Owens, who spoke during the ceremony in response to the honor, said: "You can imagine how overwhelmed we are at being honored in such a way."

== Personal life ==
Owens and his wife, Adeline Lois Preuss Owens (born March 3, 1930, in Augusta, Kansas; died September 26, 2019, in Olathe, Kansas, who were married on May 30, 1951, have four daughters: Donna Jean Bean (born April 12, 1957) of Olathe, Kansas; Deborah "Debbie" Lynn Bohi (born February 27, 1961) of Gardner, Kansas, who is married to evangelist Daniel W. Bohi, and has four married children; Darlene Denise Conyers (born May 20, 1963) of Allen, Texas, who is married to Rodney Conyers, and has two sons; and Dorothy Mae Owens DeNeve (born March 3, 1966) of Olathe, Kansas.

== Works ==
=== Theses ===
- "Indigenous Church Principles as a Possible Solution for the Unfinished Task of Missions." M.A. thesis, Bethany Nazarene College. Bethany, OK: 1967.
- "Korean Shamanism: Its Components, Context, and Functions." Ph.D. thesis, University of Oklahoma. Norman, OK: 1975.

=== Books ===
- Challenge in Korea. Kansas City, MO: Beacon Hill, 1957.
- The Church Behind the Bamboo Curtain: The Story of the Church Inside Red China. Kansas City, MO: Nazarene, 1973.
- Revival Fires in Korea. Kansas City, MO: Nazarene, 1977.
- Sing Ye Islands: 1979–80 Missionary Resource Book on the Pacific Islands. Kansas City, MO: Nazarene, 1979.

=== Articles ===
- "Church Growth in Korea." In Ministering to the Millions, pp. 102–108. Department of World Mission. Kansas City, MO: Nazarene, 1971.
- "Finding God's Will in Missions." Unpublished paper (July 1, 2011).
- "Missiological Education as Missionary Theology." The Mediator 6:2 (2004):1–10.
- "Some Reflections on Building Bridges." The Mediator 6:2 (2004):11–14.
- "Theological Foundations of Missions." The Mediator 6:2 (2004).
