= Talmadge Johnson =

American religious minister (1937–2023)

W. Talmadge Johnson

33rd General Superintendent (Church of the Nazarene)
- In office 2001–2005
- Preceded by: Jim L. Bond
- Succeeded by: Jesse C. Middendorf

Personal details
- Born: Walker Talmage Johnson, Jr. February 26, 1937 Nampa, Idaho
- Died: December 6, 2023 (aged 86)
- Relatives: James Austin Johnson (grandson)
- Education: Bethany Nazarene College

Walter Talmadge Johnson Jr. (1937 – December 6, 2023) was an American minister and emeritus general superintendent in the Church of the Nazarene. His grandson is Saturday Night Live (SNL) star James Austin Johnson.

== Biography ==
=== Early years ===
Walter Talmadge Johnson Jr. was born on February 26, 1937, to Helen (née Pound) Johnson and Walter Talmadge Johnson Sr., in Nampa, Idaho at the Samaritan Hospital on the Northwest Nazarene College campus.

=== Education ===
Johnson graduated from Bethany Nazarene College (now Southern Nazarene University) in 1958 with BA and MA degrees in religion.

=== Career ===
Talmadge was ordained in 1958. Service in the Nazarene church was a long tradition in his family. Both his grandfather, Earl C. Pounds, and his father, W. T. Johnson, served as district superintendents for the church.

Johnson served as an evangelist in the denomination 1958 until 1961 and served as the pastor of churches in Oklahoma from 1961 until 1975. In 1975, he was elected to serve as the district superintendent of the Mississippi District and served in that capacity until he was elected to be the District Superintendent of the Tennessee district in 1980. Johnson was the District Superintendent of the Tennessee district until 1994.

While still in the pastorate and district superintendency, Johnson served on the denominational level. From 1972 until 1976, he was the general Nazarene Youth International president. He was the chairman of the World Mission Department from 1986 until 1994. He also served on the General Board of the denomination from 1972 to 1976 and from 1980 to 1994.

In 1994, Johnson left the superintendency of Tennessee and the General Board to serve as the denominational director of Sunday School Ministries. He served in this capacity until June 2001 when, at the 25th General Assembly of the Church of the Nazarene, Johnson was elected to the denomination's highest office: General Superintendent. Johnson served only one term as General Superintendent because of the denomination's mandatory retirement age, He attained emeritus status at the 2005 General Assembly.

After retirement, Talmadge continued to serve in the Nazarene church - as interim district superintendent for the Southwest Oklahoma and Kentucky districts. Later, he taught at the Agape Sunday School at Trevecca Community Church.

=== Death ===
On December 6, 2023, Dr. Walker Talmadge Johnson Jr. died He was preceded in death by his wife Genell (née Crawford) Johnson, after nearly 63 years of marriage. He was survived by their two sons and many grandchildren and great-grandchildren.

== Authorship ==
————; Toler, Stan (January 2000). Rediscovering the Sunday School. Kansas City: Beacon Hill Press. ISBN 9780834118690. LCCN 99087539. OCLC 43109898. OL 8189635M – via Internet Archive.

== Awards and recognitions ==
- Doctor of Divinity – Trevecca Nazarene University conferred the honorary Doctor of Divinity degree to Johnson in 1983. Southern Nazarene University granted him the same honorary degree in 2000.
- In 2003 Southern Nazarene University awarded Johnson the Heritage Award which is an award granted annually to a prominent alumnus of the school.
