= J. K. Warrick =

J. K. Warrick (born 1945) is a minister and general superintendent emeritus in the Church of the Nazarene.

Following nearly 38 years of pastoral ministry, Warrick was elected to the Board of General Superintendents by the 26th General Assembly held in Indianapolis, Indiana, in 2005, and remained on it until 2017. When elected general superintendent, he had served for nearly 12 years as pastor of College Church of the Nazarene in Olathe, Kansas.

He attended Bethany Nazarene College, later graduating with a Th.B. from Trinity College of the Bible in Newburgh, IN. At the time of his election, he was pursuing a master's degree from Wesley Biblical Seminary. In 1994 Southern Nazarene University honored him with a doctor of divinity. He has served on the Board of Trustees at Mount Vernon Nazarene University and at MidAmerica Nazarene University.

In 1967 he married Patty Outz. They have two children and seven grandchildren.
