= Orville Jenkins =

American minister

Orville Wesley Jenkins (April 29, 1913 – February 5, 2007) was an American minister and emeritus general superintendent in the Church of the Nazarene.

Jenkins was born in Bosque County, Texas in 1913. He was the first child born to Daniel Wesley Jenkins and Eva (Caldwell) Jenkins. He came to know Jesus as his savior in a small Nazarene church in Corcoran, California in 1935. He soon became a part of a Church of the Nazarene in Porterville, California and two years later was sanctified in that same church and called to preach. It was also in this same church he met and later married Louise Cantrell.

Jenkins studied at Texas Tech University in Lubbock and graduated from Pasadena College (now Point Loma Nazarene University). He pursued graduate studies at Nazarene Theological Seminary in Kansas City and in 1957 received an honorary doctoral degree while a trustee of Bethany Nazarene College (now Southern Nazarene University).

Jenkins pastored several churches in his life of ministry, including Kansas City First Church of the Nazarene. He later served as superintendent of the West Texas and Kansas City districts before becoming executive secretary of the Department of Home Missions for the denomination.

Jenkins was elected general superintendent in 1968 and served as a member of the Board of General Superintendents until 1985.

In a letter written upon his retirement from the Board of General Superintendents, Jenkins expressed love for the church he served and his hope for its future:

"I love our church and am jealous for its preservation and its future. I believe that together, under God's anointing and great presence among us, we can have great revivals everywhere and in every land, and I believe we can be true to our God-given assignment of preaching, living, and leading millions of others into the Spirit-filled, wholly sanctified life."

Jenkins is preceded in death by his wife, M. Louise Jenkins, who died in May 2004.

Jenkins leaves behind a legacy in the Church of the Nazarene. His son, Orville W. Jenkins, Jr., serves as the superintendent of the North Florida District and son-in-law John Calhoun is superintendent of the Northern California District. Also, son-in-law David Hubbs is pastor of worship and music at College Church of the Nazarene in Olathe, Kansas.
