= William J. Prince =

American theologian (1930–2012)

28th General Superintendent Church of the Nazarene
- In office August 16, 1990 – July 31, 2001

Personal details
- Born: January 11, 1930 Altus, Oklahoma
- Died: December 24, 2012 (aged 82)
- Spouse: Evelyn J. Prince
- Education: Bethany Nazarene College; Nazarene Theological Seminary
- Profession: Minister; Educator; General Superintendent

William J. Prince (1930 - 2012) was a minister, college president, and emeritus general superintendent in the Church of the Nazarene.

Prince became the district superintendent for the Pittsburgh District Church of the Nazarene in 1979. After serving in Pittsburgh he was selected to be president of Mount Vernon Nazarene University where he served from 1980 to 1989.

There is an endowed scholarship at Nazarene Theological Seminary named after Prince and his wife Evelyn.

In 2004 Mount Vernon Nazarene University named its new student union the William and Evelyn Prince Student Union. Evelyn died August 22, 2006.

Prince died December 24, 2012. Funeral services held at Bethany First Church of the Nazarene in Bethany Oklahoma with interment in Bethany Cemetery, Bethany Oklahoma.
