= Jerry Porter =

Jerry Porter may refer to:

- Jerry Porter (American football) (born 1978), American football player
- Jerry D. Porter (born 1940s), General Superintendent of the Church of the Nazarene
