= Darrel R. Falk =

American geneticist

- Born: 1946 (age 79–80); Canada
- Education: Simon Fraser University; University of Alberta
- Occupation: Professor of biology at Point Loma Nazarene University
- Scientific career
- Fields: Biology
- Workplaces: Syracuse University, Mount Vernon Nazarene University, Point Loma Nazarene University

Darrel R. Falk (born 1946) is an American biologist. He is Professor Emeritus of Biology at Point Loma Nazarene University and is the past president and a current senior advisor with BioLogos Foundation, an advocacy group that emphasizes Theistic evolution.

== Education ==
Falk graduated from Simon Fraser University in 1968 with a B.S. degree in biology. He then completed his Ph.D. at the University of Alberta in 1973.

== Career and research ==
He did post-doctoral studies at the University of British Columbia (1973–74) and at the University of California, Irvine (1974–76). He was an Assistant/Associate Professor at Syracuse University from 1976 to 1984. Then a professor at Mount Vernon Nazarene University from 1984 to 1988. Since 1988, he has been a professor at Point Loma Nazarene University.

His research interests have included molecular genetics of Drosophila melanogaster, organization of genes; and mechanism of repair of chromosome breaks.

== Christian beliefs ==
Falk is a Christian and believes in theistic evolution. He is the past president (2009-2012) of The BioLogos Foundation, founded by geneticist Francis Collins, which seeks to find "harmony between science and biblical faith" by advocating for "an evolutionary understanding of God’s creation".

He has authored a book on the creation–evolution controversy titled Coming to Peace with Science: Bridging the Worlds Between Faith and Biology (InterVarsity Press, 2004), with a foreword by Collins. He has been critical of the intelligent design movement and written about the movement frequently on The BioLogos Foundation's website.

== Publications ==
- The Fool and the Heretic How Two Scientists Moved beyond Labels to a Christian Dialogue about Creation and Evolution (with Todd Charles Wood) (Zondervan Academic, 2019) ISBN 9780310595434
- Coming to Peace with Science: Bridging the Worlds Between Faith and Biology (InterVarsity Press, 2004)
- Affirming: The Brightening Lamp (with Arthur F. Seamans) (Point Loma Press, 2002) ISBN 0-9652698-6-8
