= John A. Knight =

American Nazarene minister (1931–2009)

26th General Superintendent Church of the Nazarene
- In office June 26, 1985 – July 31, 2001

Personal details
- Born: John Allen Knight, Sr. November 8, 1931
- Died: February 2, 2009 (aged 77) Daytona Beach, Florida, US
- Spouse: Justine A. Knight
- Education: Bethany Nazarene College; Oklahoma State University; Vanderbilt Divinity School; Vanderbilt University
- Profession: Pastor; Educator; General Superintendent

John Allen Knight (November 8, 1931 – February 2, 2009) was a minister in the Church of the Nazarene, general superintendent in the Church of the Nazarene, president of Mount Vernon Nazarene College (1972–1975), and editor of the Herald of Holiness, now known as Holiness Today (1975–1976). He was born in Mineral Wells, Texas and died at the age of 77 while on vacation in Daytona Beach, Florida. The John A. & Justine A. Knight Scholarship Fund at Southern Nazarene University is named for him and his wife.
