= Jesse Middendorf =

American minister

Jesse C. Minnendorf

General Superintendent (Church of the Nazarene)
- In office 2001–2013
- Preceded by: W. Talmadge Johnson
- Succeeded by: Nina G. Gunter
- Website: jessecmiddendorf.com

Jesse C. Middendorf (born 1942 in Nashville, Tennessee) is a minister and general superintendent emeritus in the Church of the Nazarene.

Middendorf was elected to the highest office in the Church of the Nazarene during the 25th General Assembly at Indianapolis, Indiana, in June 2001. Prior to his election he was the senior pastor of the First Church of the Nazarene in Kansas City, Missouri. Middendorf is the son of Rev. Jesse A. Middendorf.
