= Dobson Hall =

Dobson Hall is the name shared by residence and academic buildings at several colleges and universities.

- Home to the Division of Fine Arts at MidAmerica Nazarene University in Olathe, Kansas, USA
- A campus services building at Northeastern Oklahoma A&M College in Miami, Oklahoma, USA
- A residence at State University of New York at Brockport in Brockport, New York, USA
- A residence at Truman State University in Kirksville, Missouri, USA
- A residence at University of Wisconsin-Platteville in Platteville, Wisconsin, USA
