= John W. Goodwin =

Nazarene minister

John W. Goodwin (1869–1945) was a minister and general superintendent in the Church of the Nazarene.

Goodwin was born near North Berwick, Maine, and was raised in the Advent Christian Church. After moving to California in 1905, he joined the Church of the Nazarene and assisted Phineas F. Bresee in the founding of Pacific Bible College. Goodwin served as pastor of the college church there and as district superintendent of the Southern California District Church of the Nazarene. When General Superintendents Bresee and William C. Wilson died in late 1915, Goodwin became a general superintendent and served 24 years, until 1940, and was also a general superintendent emeritus until his death in 1945. Goodwin was also a long-time supporter, and even responsible for the naming of, The Eastern Nazarene College.
