= Edward Lawlor =

English minister (1907–1987)

Edward G. Lawlor (1907-1987), born in England into a Roman Catholic family and raised in Canada, was a minister for most of his adult life in the Church of the Nazarene.

Edward Lawlor was born on June 7, 1907 in South Bank, North Yorkshire. His father died when he was still quite young. At that point, his mother emigrated to Canada with her four children.

At age 18, Edward was converted through the ministry of the Salvation Army. Not long after that he felt that God was calling him to preach. So he went to the Salvation Army Training College in Toronto. After graduation, he began his ministry as a Salvationist. In 1928, Captain Lawlor married Salvationist Peggy Baird, a Scottish immigrant he had met just three weeks before. Lawlor was also active for a time with the YMCA and with Youth for Christ. He even spent a year ministering to Canada's First Nations people.

In 1934, through the influence of J.B. Chapman, Edward Lawlor joined the Church of the Nazarene. He was ordained into the Nazarene ministry in 1936. In 1939, he became pastor of Calgary First Church of the Nazarene. After seven years in that position, he was elected in 1946 as district superintendent of the Alberta, Canada District of Nazarene congregations. That same year, Canadian Nazarene College conferred on him an honorary Doctor of Divinity degree. When the Alberta district merged with those in Manitoba and Saskatchewan in 1949 to form the Canada West District, Edward Lawlor became that united district's first superintendent, a position he held for 11 years. In 1948, he was elected to the denomination's General Board and to the Board of Trustees of Nazarene Theological Seminary in Kansas City, MO. From 1948 to 1952, he also served as the secretary of the denomination's ministerial benevolence committee.

In 1952, the Commission on the Mid-Century Crusade for Souls asked Edward Lawlor to write a booklet on the importance of every believer being involved in evangelistic outreach. Lawlor's 27-page booklet titled The Covenant Supreme was published in 1952.

Then, in 1960, Edward Lawlor was asked to become executive secretary of the denomination's four-year-old Department of Evangelism. In 1963, he authored a 23-page booklet titled Wake Up and Witness: A Message to the Church. In 1968, at 61 years of age, Edward Lawlor was elected on the second ballot of that summer's Nazarene General Assembly to the first of two four-year terms he would serve as a Nazarene general superintendent. During his first term, he had jurisdiction over the denomination's ministry in the Caribbean as well as several districts in the U.S.A. During his second term, Lawlor oversaw Nazarene work in India, the Cape Verde Islands, the Middle East, and Europe as well as some districts in the U.S.A.

It was during that second term of service that he presided over the ordination service for Howard Culbertson at the San Antonio, TX district assembly. Two years later the Culbertsons were in Italy as Nazarene missionaries and Dr. Lawlor presided over a dedication service in Florence for their newly born second child, Rachele Leah. Lawlor said the infant was the youngest child he had ever dedicated.

Upon his retirement in 1976, the denomination elected Edward Lawlor to General Superintendent Emeritus status. Even in retirement he continued preach. For instance, in 1979, he gave the David K. Wachtel Lecture Series on Evangelism at Trevecca Nazarene University. In 1981, he was the evangelist for the joint spring revival held at Olivet Nazarene University and Bourbonnais (IL) College Church of the Nazarene.

Edward Lawlor died on November 24, 1987, in San Diego, CA. After his death, Canadian Nazarene College set up a ministerial student scholarship fund to honor him. The first scholarships from that fund were awarded in 1989. Preference is given to those planning to be evangelists. Edward's wife Margaret died in 1997.

In the summer 2013 issue of The Evangelist's Perspective, editor Gary Bond wrote: "Dr. Lawlor had a powerful presence and preaching style. I remember sitting with my friend John Seaman in a revival meeting in the Chicago Emerald Avenue Church mesmerized by his delivery and challenged by his sermon." A few years before, Evangelist Chuck Milhuff wrote that Edward Lawlor had been one of the three men who had "most influenced" him.

In the Board of General Superintendents' quadrennial address to the 2013 Nazarene General Assembly, spokesman Eugenio Duarte quoted Edward Lawlor as saying, "“Our task is to see that this message (of holiness) becomes the fulfillment of all the hopes and dreams of all mankind in this world of tension."

A phrase Edeward Lawlor used on more than one occasion was "mastered by a vision." In March 1972, at a Spokane, WA, evangelistic event, Dr. Lawlor said the tragedy of the church today is that it "is living with the memory of a vision rather than being mastered by a vision."

Another saying for which Lawlor has become known is: "If God's love is for anybody anywhere, it's for everybody everywhere."

== Sources ==
Recorded sermon Youtube

Corbett, C.T., Pioneer Builders: Men who helped shape the Church of the Nazarene in its formative years. Kansas City, Mo.: Beacon Hill Press of Kansas City, 1979.

Lawlor, Edward. "Living the life of holiness," in The Holiness Pulpit, No. 2: Sermons by contemporary leaders of the holiness movement., James McGraw, comp. Kansas City, Mo.: Beacon Hill Press, 1974.

Lawlor, Edward. Strengthen the Things that Remain, Kansas City, Mo.: Nazarene Publishing House, 1972 (16-page boopklet)

Articles by Edward Laawlor in The Preacher's Magazine / The Nazarene Preacher:

- "Building Churches for Evangelism," Vol. 37, No. 10 (October 1962), pp. 9–11
- "House to House Visitation," February, 1969, pp. 1,3
- "Intention -- Achievement," Vol 41, No. 3 (March 1966), pp. 3–4.
- "Lord, Give Us a Miracle," December, 1969, p. 1
- "Preaching for a Verdict," Vol 38, No. 4 (April 1963), pp. 4–5, 9.
- "The Conservative Theological Position and the Spirit of Evangelism," Vol 33, No. 9 (Sept. 1958), pp. 25–28
