= Hardy Powers =

American minister and general superintendent in the Church of the Nazarene

Hardy C. Powers (1900–1972) was an American minister and general superintendent in the Church of the Nazarene.

A native of Texas, Dr. Hardy C. Powers was converted to Christianity at the Alhambra, California Church of the Nazarene, and took theological training for ministry at Pasadena College in Pasadena, California. After 12 years in the pastorate and 8 years as superintendent of the Iowa District, Dr. Powers was elected to the general superintendency in 1944. He served in this capacity until his retirement in 1968. He was general superintendent emeritus until his death in 1972.

Dr. Powers was married to Ruby Mae and they had five children.
