= Filimão Chambo =

Mozambican pastor

Filimão M. Chambo

42nd General Superintendent Church of the Nazarene
- Incumbent
- Assumed office July 26, 2017

Personal details
- Born: Mozambique
- Spouse: Samantha Chambo
- Children: Tsakani Gabriella; Emanuel
- Education: Seminário Nazareno, Mozambique; Nazarene Theological College, Muldersdrift; University of Johannesburg
- Profession: Pastor; Academic; Administrator

Rev. Dr. Filimão M. Chambo is a Mozambican pastor who serves as General Superintendent in the Church of the Nazarene. On 26 June 2017, he was elected as the 42nd General Superintendent on the 7th ballot in the 29th General Assembly of the Church of the Nazarene. Prior to being elected as General Superintendent, he served as the Africa Regional Director of the Church of the Nazarene. He succeeded Rev. Dr. Eugenio Duarte in the role of Regional Director when Eugenio Duarte was elected as the first non-North American General Superintendent in 2009. He now serves alongside Eugenio Duarte, Gustavo Crocker and Carla Sunberg as non-US born leaders.

Filimão was raised in a pastor's home in Mozambique. His parents, Rev. Manuel Tshambe and Rev. Bessie Louisa Tshambe, met at the Nazarene Bible College in Tavarne, Mozambique, where they were married in January, 1969. His mother became senior pastor of the Central Maputo congregation in 1992. Filimão first felt a call to Christian ministry at nine years of age. He lost a brother, Morgan, to an automobile accident in 2009.

== Previous positions ==
Chambo's previous posts in the Church of the Nazarene include the following:

- Pastoral Ministry

    - Igreja do Nazareno da Matola Cidade, Mozambique
    - Mphagane and Eldorado Park Churches of the Nazarene, South Africa

- Education

    - Lecturer, Nazarene Theological College, South Africa
    - Lecturer, Seminário Nazareno, Mozambique
    - President, Seminário Nazareno, Mozambique
    - Regional Education Coordinator, Church of the Nazarene (2005-2009)

Chambo is married to the Rev. Samantha Chambo, also an ordained elder in the Church of the Nazarene. Together, they have two children, a daughter, Tsakani Gabriella, and a son, Emanuel.
