= Howard Miller (minister) =

American superintendent for the Church of the Nazarene

Howard V. Miller (1894–1948) was a minister and general superintendent in the Church of the Nazarene. He was born in Brooktondale, New York, and joined the Church of the Nazarene in 1922. He served as pastor, district superintendent, and college professor until his election to the general superintendency in 1940.

Miller was married to Rhea Miller, who wrote the words of the popular hymn "I'd Rather Have Jesus", which was subsequently set to music by George Beverly Shea.

== Legacy ==
The Olivet Nazarene University has a Miller Business Center, which is named for Dr. Howard V. Miller.
