= Eugene Stowe =

American minister (1922–2020)

Eugene L. Stowe

20th General Superintendent Church of the Nazarene
- In office June 21, 1968 – July 29, 1993

Personal details
- Born: Eugene L. Stowe; May 2, 1922 Iowa
- Died: April 6, 2020 (aged 97)
- Spouse: Faye C. Stowe
- Education: Pasadena Nazarene College; Berkley Baptist Divinity Seminary
- Profession: Pastor; Educator; General Superintendent

Eugene L. Stowe (May 2, 1922 – April 6, 2020) was an American minister and emeritus general superintendent in the Church of the Nazarene.

He served as president of Nazarene Theological Seminary from 1966 to 1968, at which time he was elected as the 20th general superintendent of the Church of the Nazarene.

Stowe wrote The Ministry of Shepherding: A Study of Pastoral Practice (ISBN 0834104431) which was published in 1976.

Stowe died on April 6, 2020.
