= Bresee Theological College =

- Former name: Kansas Holiness Bible College
- Type: Private
- Active: 1905–1940
- Affiliation: Nazarene
- Location: Hutchinson, Kansas, United States
- Campus: Rural

Bresee College was a junior college in Hutchinson, Kansas, United States. It has closed and merged with Bethany-Peniel College.

== History ==
Mattie Hoke founded Kansas Holiness Bible College in Hutchinson, Kansas 1905. It was first supported by a local holiness congregation called Apostolic holiness Church, then later by the Kansas and Nebraska District Churches of the Nazarene under the name of Bresee Theological College. In 1917, R. E. Dunham was president of Kansas Holiness College. It came under the leadership of Olivet alumnus Sylvester T. Ludwig, also the general secretary for the Church of the Nazarene, starting in 1927. In 1940, its financial situation overwhelmed it and it closed to merge with Bethany-Peniel College, and Ludwig took the presidency there.

The yearbook was called The Comet.
