= James Diehl =

American Christian minister (1937–2025)

James H. Diehl (September 5, 1937 – November 2, 2025) was an American Christian minister and general superintendent emeritus in the Church of the Nazarene. He was elected in 1993 and served until 2009.

Diehl died on November 2, 2025, at the age of 88.
