= Orval J. Nease =

Orval John Nease (1891–1950) was a minister, Nazarene General Superintendent, and president of Pasadena College. He was the brother of Floyd W. Nease, also a Nazarene college president.

== Early life and education ==
Nease was born December 25, 1891, in Nashville, Michigan, the son of William O. Nease, a Nazarene evangelist. He received his bachelor's degree from Pasadena College in 1916, a master's degree from Boston University in 1925, and a doctor of divinity from Pasadena College in 1931.

== Career ==
He was pastor of the First Churches of the Nazarene in Malden, Massachusetts, Columbus, Ohio, and Detroit, Michigan. He served as president of alma mater Pasadena College.

He was also a general superintendent in the Church of the Nazarene first elected in 1940. He has the distinction of being the only member of the Board of General Superintendents ever removed. He was re-elected to the General Superintendency in 1948.
