= Daniel Vanderpool =

Daniel Isom Vanderpool (1891-1988) was a minister and general superintendent in the Church of the Nazarene.

Born September 6, 1891, in Missouri, Dr. Daniel Isom Vaderpool was converted in a Free Methodist Church and began preaching in country schoolhouses within three months. Joining the Church of the Nazarene in 1913, Dr. Vanderpool was educated at John Fletcher and Pasadena (Nazarene) colleges.

He served as district superintendent for 19 years before his election to the general superintendency in 1949. He served in this position until 1964. After retirement in that year he became general superintendent emeritus. He served churches in Colorado, Pasadena and Washington.

Vanderpool with married to Edith who died in 1928; he then married Emmalyn. He had four children. Three of his children became preachers in the Nazarene Church and the fourth married a preacher.

Death came on March 21, 1988, with burial in Greenwood/Memory Lawn Mortuary & Cemetery, Phoenix, Maricopa County.
