= Edward F. Walker =

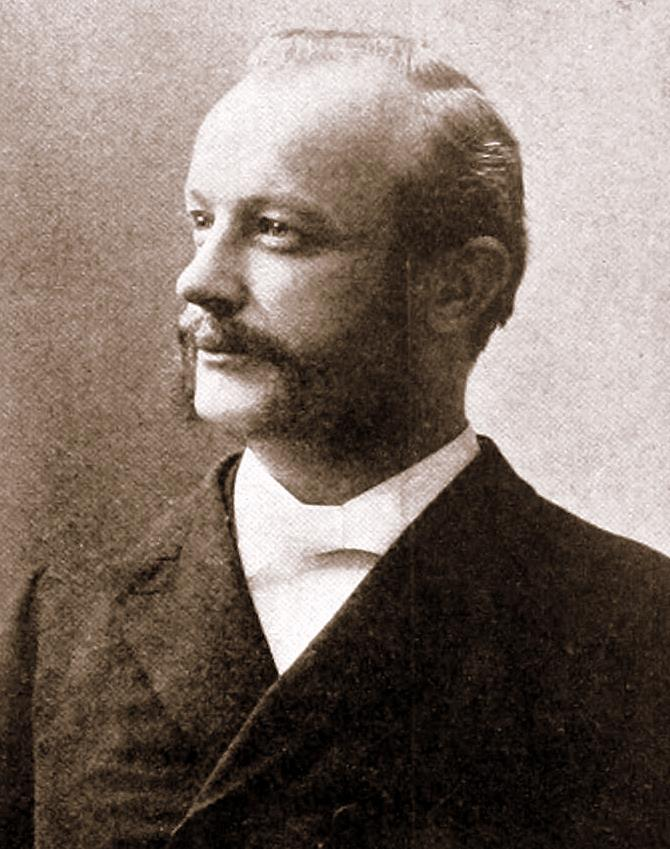
Edward F Walker

Edward F. Walker (January 20, 1852 – 1918) was a minister and general superintendent in the Church of the Nazarene.

Born in Steubenville, Ohio, Walker pastored both Methodist and Presbyterian churches before joining the Church of the Nazarene in 1908. He pastored Los Angeles First and Pasadena First Nazarene churches in addition to serving as president of Olivet University from 1915 to 1916 and Pasadena University from 1917 to 1918. He was elected general superintendent in 1911, and continued in office until his death in 1918.
