= Stan Toler =

American cleric (1950-2017)

Stan A. Toler

39th General Superintendent Church of the Nazarene
- In office July 2, 2009 – August 2, 2013

Personal details
- Born: Stan A. Toler; November 7, 1950 Welch, West Virginia
- Died: November 18, 2017 (aged 67) Oklahoma City, Oklahoma
- Spouse: Linda C. Toler
- Education: Ohio State Barber College; Ohio Christian University; Florida Beacon Bible College; Maranatha Seminary; Southern Nazarene University
- Profession: Author; Minister; General Superintendent
- Website: https://www.stantoler.com/

Stan A. Toler (November 7, 1950 – November 18, 2017) was a minister and general superintendent emeritus in the Church of the Nazarene. He was also an author having written 100 books, many of them published through the Nazarene Publishing House. He served as a Pastor in Ohio, Florida, Tennessee and Oklahoma.

Toler was 11 years old when his father was killed in a construction accident. He preached his first sermon at age 14 and would go on to preach over 15,000 sermons over the remainder of his life, speaking in all 50 states and in 80 countries.

He took his first pastorate at the age of 17 and continued to pastor churches in Florida, Tennessee and Oklahoma until 2009. He was elected district superintendent of the Southwest Oklahoma District in June 2009. Before he could assume his duties as district superintendent, he was elected as the 39th general superintendent of the Church of the Nazarene on July 2, 2009. He held that office for four years, choosing not to allow his name to go forward for reelection at the 2013 general assembly.

Toler authored more than 100 books, including his best-sellers, The Power of Your Attitude; The Secret Blend; The Relational Leader; Practical Guide to Pastoral Ministry; his popular Minute Motivator series; Outstanding Leadership; and I’ve Never Been This Old Before – The Dawn of the Middle Ages. His books have sold more than 3 million copies.
