= Paul Cunningham (minister) =

American Nazarene minister (1937–2020)

Paul G. Cunningham

30th General Superintendent Church of the Nazarene
- In office July 29, 1993 – August 6, 2009

Personal details
- Born: Paul George Cunningham; August 27, 1937
- Died: July 18, 2020 (aged 82) Olathe, Kansas
- Spouse: Connie R. Cunningham
- Education: Olivet Nazarene College; Nazarene Theological Seminary
- Profession: Pastor; General Superintendent

Paul G. Cunningham (August 27, 1937 – July 18, 2020) was a minister and general superintendent emeritus in the Church of the Nazarene.

Cunningham was elected to the highest office in the Church of the Nazarene at the denomination's 23rd General Assembly in Indianapolis, Indiana in July 1993. Prior to his election he served as the senior pastor of College Church of the Nazarene in Olathe, Kansas. Cunningham retired from the office of General Superintendent after the 2009 General Assembly in June 2009.

Upon his graduation from Nazarene Theological Seminary in 1964, Cunningham took an assignment as pastor of Olathe Church of the Nazarene in Olathe, Kansas. He went to Olathe in 1964 to pastor the local Church of the Nazarene. He remained as pastor for the next thirty years, growing the church from 54 members in 1964 to a constituency of more than 3,000 upon his departure in 1993. Total financial giving grew from $11,000 to over $3 million in that same time.

Cunningham played a vital role in bringing MidAmerica Nazarene College (now MidAmerica Nazarene University) to the Olathe area. In 1969, Olathe Church of the Nazarene was renamed to Olathe College Church of the Nazarene. In 1975, the school awarded him the honorary Doctor of Divinity degree.

A lifelong churchman, Cunningham served the denomination in a number of capacities, including as chairman of the Board of Trustees of Nazarene Theological Seminary, a member of the general church Book Committee, secretary of the Board of Trustees at MidAmerica Nazarene University, and as a member of the Kansas City District Advisory Board. He also served on the General Board of the Church of the Nazarene, including two terms as its president.

At the 1993 General Assembly, Cunningham was elected as the Church of the Nazarene's 30th general superintendent. He held that office until his retirement in 2009.

In 1991 he was chosen by the Olathe Chamber of Commerce as Citizen of the Year. Two years later, the city of Olathe presented him with its highest honor, the J.T. Barton Award in recognition of his service to the community. In 2015 MidAmerica Nazarene University honored Dr. and Mrs. Cunningham with a Lifetime Achievement Award.
