= Jim Bond =

Minister and emeritus general superintendent in the Church of the Nazarene

James L. Bond (born 1936) is a minister and emeritus general superintendent in the Church of the Nazarene. He was elected at the 24th General Assembly in San Antonio, Texas, in June 1997 and served until retirement in July 2005.

He came into the position of General Superintendent from the presidency of Point Loma Nazarene University, a position he held for 14 years. He served on several national and state higher education boards. Among these were the Executive Committee of the Association of Independent California Colleges and Universities, the Board of Directors of the Coalition of Christian Colleges and Universities, the Board of Directors of the American Association of Presidents of Independent Colleges and Universities, and the Council of Presidents of the National Association of Intercollegiate Athletics.

He earned his bachelor of arts degree from Pasadena College (now Point Loma Nazarene University). He went to Pasadena College in 1954 as an all-American high school basketball player from Pampa, Texas. At Pasadena College he was named to the National Association of Intercollegiate Athletics (NAIA) All-American team two years. In more recent years he has been inducted into five halls of fame, including the NAIA Hall of Fame and the National High School Athletic Hall of Fame.

After graduation, he was drafted by the Minneapolis Lakers to but declined the opportunity to play in the NBA so that he could prepare for church ministry at Nazarene Theological Seminary, where he earned his bachelor of divinity degree (equivalent to today's Master of Divinity). Later, he completed the doctor of ministry degree from Fuller Theological Seminary. He is also the recipient of three honorary degrees: the doctor of divinity from Southern Nazarene University, the doctor of humane letters from Northern Arizona University, and the doctor of humane letters from Point Loma Nazarene University.

He pastored churches in Kansas, Wyoming, Idaho, Oklahoma, and Colorado and was a missionary to Brazil for a brief time. Prior to going to Point Loma Nazarene University, he was chaplain and professor of practical theology at Nazarene Bible College in Colorado Springs.
