= Linda N. Hanson =

American academic

Linda N. Hanson is an American academic. She became Hamline University's 19th president in July 2005. Hanson is president emeritus of the College of Santa Fe, where she served as president for just under five years. Previously, Hanson served nine years as vice president for university relations at Seattle University, where she was also assistant to the provost for executive education.

Hanson grew up in Savannah, Georgia, and taught English in secondary schools for six years. She graduated summa cum laude from Southern Nazarene University in Oklahoma with a degree in English and speech communication. She earned a doctor of education in educational leadership and a master's degree in educational administration from Seattle University.

Before joining Seattle University, Hanson served as president of Independent Colleges of Washington, a consortium of ten independent colleges and universities in Washington, and as vice president for development at Texas A&M University in Corpus Christi. She spent many years in arts management, as director of development for The Denver Centre for the Performing Arts and as executive director of the Paramount Theatre for the Performing Arts in Austin, Texas.

Hanson served as a member of executive committee of the Associated Colleges of the Twin Cities and as a member of the Minnesota Private College Council board of directors.
