= Raymond Hurn =

Raymond W. Hurn (1921–2007) was a minister and general superintendent in the Church of the Nazarene.
