= David Busic =

American minister (born 1964)

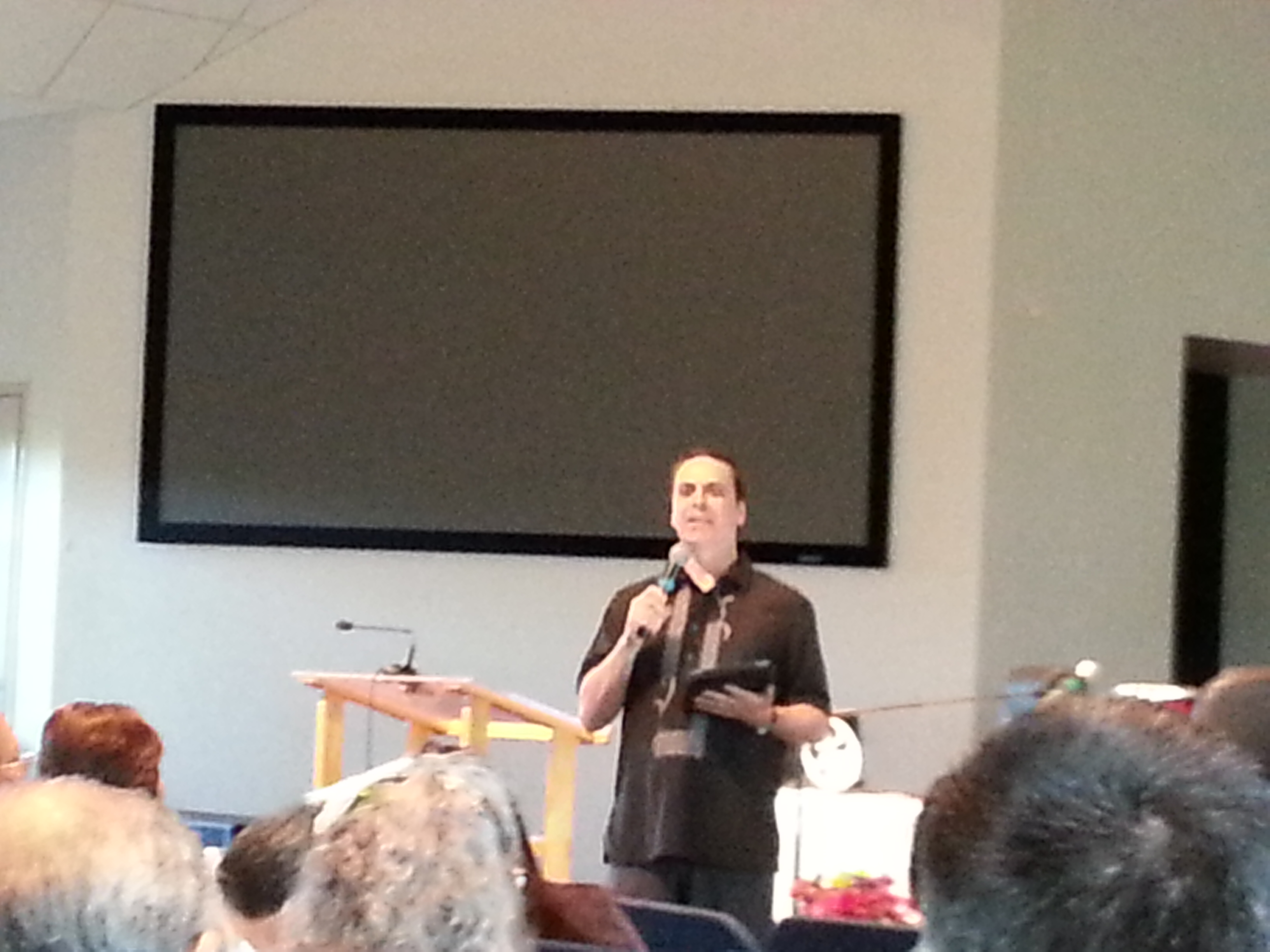
HIPAC District Assembly, 2014, Honolulu Nazarene Church. Pacific.

David Busic (born 1964) is an ordained minister and 40th general superintendent of the Church of the Nazarene, the denomination's highest elected office. He was elected on June 25, 2013, at the 28th General Assembly and Conventions in Indianapolis, Indiana.

Prior to his election as general superintendent, Busic served as the president of the Nazarene Theological Seminary in Kansas City, Missouri. He has also served as the senior pastor of Bethany First Church of the Nazarene (Bethany, OK), Central Church of the Nazarene (Lenexa, KS), and Vineyard Community Church of the Nazarene (Livermore, CA). He served on staff at the Church of the Nazarene in Shawnee, Kansas.

He has served as a member of the Church of the Nazarene's General Board, as well as serving as the president of the USA National Board. He served as a member of the Board of General Superintendents' Thought Partners, "a think tank for critical issues facing the Church of the Nazarene," from 2005 to 2013, as a member of the Southern Nazarene University Board of Trustees, and as a member of the Northwest Oklahoma District Advisory Board.

In 2007, while serving as senior pastor of Bethany First Church, Busic played a key role in establishing the Swaziland Partnership, which seeks "to help reduce the HIV/AIDS rate and assist vulnerable children in Swaziland, Africa."

Busic graduated from Southern Nazarene University with a Bachelor of Arts degree in religion and from Nazarene Theological Seminary with a Master of Divinity. In May 2010, Southern Nazarene University awarded him an honorary Doctor of Divinity degree. As of 2013, he was also pursuing a Doctor of Ministry degree in Theology and Culture from Fuller Theological Seminary.

Busic is the author or co-author of numerous books and articles. From 2000 to 2007, he served as co-editor of Preacher's Magazine: A Preaching Resource in the Wesleyan Tradition. His other books include A Pastor's Guide to Effective Preaching, Sharing My Faith, Perfectly Imperfect: Character Sketches from the Old Testament, and Perfectly Imperfect: Character Sketches from the New Testament (forthcoming in 2014).
