= David W. Graves =

American educator (born 1953)

38th General Superintendent Church of the Nazarene
- In office July 1, 2009 – June 2023

Personal details
- Born: David W. Graves; October 27, 1953 (age 72)
- Spouse: Sharon L. Graves
- Education: Olivet Nazarene College; Nazarene Theological Seminary
- Profession: Minister; Administrator; General Superintendent

David W. Graves (born 1953) is an American educator and theologian who serves as a General Superintendent in the Church of the Nazarene.

== Education and family ==
Graves was educated at Olivet Nazarene University and received a Master of Divinity degree from Nazarene Theological Seminary. Graves received an honorary Doctor of Divinity from Olivet Nazarene University. Graves and his wife, Sharon, have four grown children.

== Career ==
Graves pastored in Kansas, Ohio, Tennessee, Oklahoma, and North Carolina. From 2001 to 2006, he was the director of Sunday School Ministries for the Church of the Nazarene International Headquarters. In 2006, he was called to be senior pastor of College Church of the Nazarene in Olathe, Kansas, where he was serving when elected General Superintendent. Graves was elected as the church's 38th General Superintendent during its 27th General Assembly in 2009 in Orlando, Florida.

== Books ==
- Sermon Outlines on the Book of Colossians, Beacon Hill Press of Kansas City, 2003 (0834120658)

== External sources ==
- Church of the Nazarene biography of Dr. David W. Graves
- Engage Magazine coverage of Dr. Graves' visit to Ethiopia on behalf of the church's leadership.
