= William C. Wilson (minister) =

American Nazarene general superintendent (1866–1915)

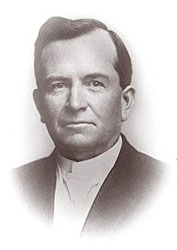
Dr. William C. Wilson, 5th General Superintendent

William C. Wilson (1866–1915) was a minister and general superintendent in the Church of the Nazarene. A native of Kentucky, W. C. Wilson was a Methodist pastor and evangelist before joining the Church of the Nazarene on the West Coast in 1903. He served as pastor and district superintendent until 1915. Dr. Wilson died shortly after his election as general superintendent in 1915.

== Works ==
- 1905 "Sketch of My Life and Travels." Unpublished MS. In the William C. Wilson Collection, Nazarene Archives, Kansas City, Missouri.
