= Eugenio Duarte =

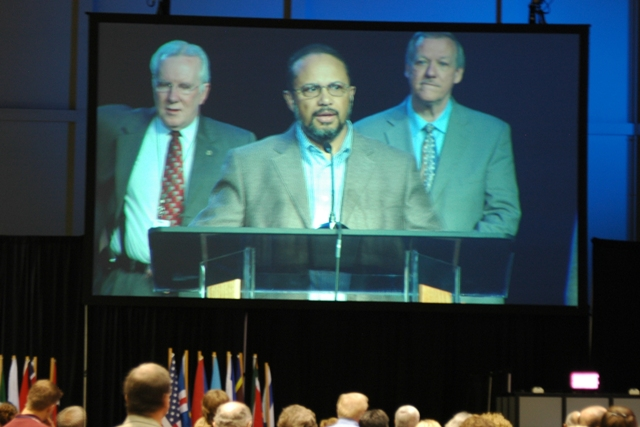
Dr. Eugenio Duarte Accepting his election to General Superintendent

Eugenio Duarte is an ordained minister and 37th General Superintendent in the Church of the Nazarene. Born in Cape Verde, Duarte was the first African elected to the General Superintendency in the Church of the Nazarene. His election occurred in the centenary year of the denomination. Duarte was elected June 30, 2009 at the 27th General Assembly of the Church of the Nazarene (in Orlando, Florida).

Duarte was born on the island of Brava, one of the Cape Verde Islands. Upon his completion of high school in the city of Mindelo, he was chosen by the Portuguese, who governed the Cape Verde Islands at that time, to be secretary to the administrator on the island of May. While there, he was active in the work of the Church of the Nazarene. He also met and married Maria Teresa, who was serving as postmaster on the island. When Cape Verde received its independence from Portugal, the new government asked Duarte to go to Moscow to study electrical engineering. He declined the offer and began to preach.

Duarte holds two master's degrees. One in leadership from California's Azusa Pacific University. and another one in Business Administration from Northwest Nazarene University. He also received an honorary Doctorate degree in 2009 from Africa Nazarene University, in Nairobi Kenya. Dr. Duarte speaks several languages, including English, Portuguese and three African languages.

He was ordained at the Cape Verde District Assembly in 1981 by general superintendent Orville Jenkins. He has served the Church of the Nazarene in various ministry capacities, including pastor, teacher, district treasurer, district superintendent, field strategy coordinator, and most recently as director of the church's Africa Region (2005-2009).

Eugenio Duarte and his wife, Maria Teresa, have three sons, Sergio, Francisco, and Richard. They live in Lenexa, Kansas, USA.
