= Jerry D. Porter =

Jerry D. Porter (born c. 1949 in Oklahoma City, Oklahoma) is a minister and general superintendent emeritus in the Church of the Nazarene.

== Education ==
Porter graduated from Bethany Nazarene College in 1971 with a Bachelor of Arts degree in religion. In the summer of 1972 he received a Master of Arts in theology degree.

== Ministry ==
Porter's first pastorate was in Angleton, Texas and he was ordained in 1974 on the Houston District Church of the Nazarene by General Superintendent Charles H. Strickland. After two and a half years in Angleton Porter was appointed to be a missionary to the Dominican Republic to start the Nazarene work in that country. He was next assigned to San José, Costa Rica, where he was rector of the Nazarene Seminary of the Americas.

Porter was elected by the General Board of the Church of the Nazarene to be the regional director for the Church of the Nazarene in the Mexico/Central America Region in 1986, which includes eight nations from Panama to Mexico.

In 1992, while his daughter Amy was receiving treatment for cancer in Dallas, Texas, he was elected by the Mid-Atlantic District to be the third district superintendent. During this time he also served on the Board of Trustees of Eastern Nazarene College and Nazarene Theological Seminary.

Porter was elected to be General Superintendent at the 24th General Assembly of the Church of the Nazarene in San Antonio, Texas, in June 1997.
