= Nina Gunter =

Church of Nazarene General Superintendent

Nina G. Gunter
- Born: 1937 (age 88–89)
- Occupation: Religious leader/author

Nina G. Gunter (born 1937) is a minister and former general superintendent in the Church of the Nazarene.

She was the first woman elected to the Church of the Nazarene's highest elected office. Gunter was ordained in 1960 on the Joplin, Missouri (USA) District of the Church of the Nazarene by Hugh C Benner.
