= Point Loma Nazarene University =

Private Christian liberal arts college in California, US

- Former names: Pacific Bible College (1902–1906), Deets Pacific Bible College (1906–1910), Nazarene University (1910–1917), Pasadena University (1917–1949), Pasadena College (1949–1973), Point Loma College: An Institution of the Church of the Nazarene (1973–1983), Point Loma Nazarene College (1983–1998)
- Type: Private university
- Established: 1902; 124 years ago
- Affiliations: CCCU; CIC
- Religious affiliation: Church of the Nazarene
- Endowment: US$37,360,494
- President: Kerry Fulcher
- Students: 4,494 (fall 2023)
- Undergraduates: 3,158 (fall 2023)
- Postgraduates: 1,336 (fall 2023)
- Location: San Diego, California, United States; 32.7169°N 117.2507°W
- Campus: Suburban
- Colors: Green & gold
- Nickname: Sea Lions
- Sporting affiliations: NCAA Division II – PacWest; NCCAA – West Region (D-I)
- Mascot: Splash the Sea Lion
- Website: pointloma.edu

Point Loma Nazarene University (PLNU) is a private university in Point Loma in San Diego, California, United States. It was founded in 1902 as a Bible college by the Church of the Nazarene.

== History ==
The university was founded by six female laypersons in the Church of the Nazarene with the assistance of Phineas F. Bresee, co-founder of the Nazarene Church in Los Angeles. The "initiators," in the words of historian Timothy L. Smith, convinced "a reluctant Bresee to support the venture."

The institution envisioned was "a simple Bible college" to train ministerial and lay leadership for the newly established Nazarene denomination; however, a Bible college did not fit Bresee's notion of a real Christian school, and he "promised little or no assistance." The women went ahead with their plan, with money raised from their husbands, and Pacific Bible College opened in 1902 under Principal Mary Hill with 41 students. In 1906, Bresee's interest in the college was piqued with a large donation from Mr. and Mrs. Jackson Deets. Bresee now saw the possibility for a real liberal arts college in the newly renamed Deets Pacific Bible College. Bresee and Deets were soon planning Nazarene University together: academy, liberal arts college, and bible school. It became one of the first three "official" educational institutions affiliated with the Church of the Nazarene in 1908, and was named Deets Pacific Bible College in 1909. In 1910, it was renamed Nazarene University and, against the wishes of Jackson Deets and the advice of Nazarene General Superintendent John W. Goodwin, the college moved to the Hugh Ranch property in Pasadena, California, after it was purchased by Bresee. It was renamed again to Pasadena University following a theological dispute and near bankruptcy in 1917.

By 1919, the name had changed once again to Pasadena College. The school received accreditation from the Western Association of Schools and Colleges in 1949. The college preparatory program was ended in the 1950s.

Pasadena College continued to face issues during the late 1960s to the early 1970s. In 1964, when Brown was elected president, the school had an operating deficit of between $500,000 and $800,000. The campus space sat at only 17 acres blocking any potential of growth. And there were health concerns regarding the smog that surrounded the school at the time. But, during a conference in San Diego in 1971, Beryl Dillman had learned that USIU's California Western campus was for sale. In 1973, Pasadena College was then moved to the former California Western university campus on Point Loma in San Diego after a rejected plan to move the school to Santa Ana. The Pasadena campus was later purchased by the U.S. Center for World Mission and currently houses William Carey International University. After the move to San Diego, the college existed for ten years as "Point Loma College: An Institution of the Church of the Nazarene" until the name was changed to Point Loma Nazarene College (PLNC) in 1983. In 1998, the name was changed again, to Point Loma Nazarene University (PLNU).

In April 2023, a dean was fired after defending an adjunct professor who was fired for "affirming" the LGBTQ+ community.

=== Presidents ===
Presidents
1.	Phineas F. Bresee	1902–1911
2.	Edgar P. Ellyson	1911–1913
3.	H. Orton Wiley	1913–1916
4.	Edward F. Walker	1917–1918
5.	Andrew O. Hendricks	1918–1923
6.	C. B. Widmeyer	1923–1926
7.	H. Orton Wiley	1926–1928
8.	Orval J. Nease	1928–1933
9.	H. Orton Wiley	1933–1949
10.	W. T. Purkiser	1949–1957
11.	Russell V. DeLong	1957–1960
12.	Oscar J. Finch	1960–1964
13.	W. Shelburne Brown	1964–1978
14.	Bill Draper	1978–1983
15.	Jim Bond	1983–1997
16.	Bob Brower	1998–2024
17.	Kerry Fulcher	2024–present

== Campus ==
PLNU has different locations besides the main campus in Point Loma for both undergraduate and graduate programs to study from. This includes the Bakersfield, Balboa, and Mission Valley Regional Centers. Other locations also include the Liberty Station Conference Center or online programs with the university. Once owned by the Theosophical Society, the Point Loma site has a lengthy pre-PLNU history.

=== Lomaland ===
Before it served as the Point Loma Nazarene University campus, the area was the location of a Theosophical commune run by Katherine Tingley. It became known as "Lomaland". By 1900, the campus was dominated by the imposing Academy Building and the adjoining Temple of Peace of the Theosophical Society. Both buildings were constructed in the Theosophical vernacular that included the flattened arch motif and whimsical references to antiquity. The buildings were topped by amethyst domes, which were lighted at night and could be seen offshore. The entrance to the Academy Building was dominated by two massive carved doors that symbolized the Theosophical Principles of "spiritual enlightenment" and "human potential." The sculptor, Reginald Machell, was educated in England, but moved to Lomaland in 1896. The interior furnishings he carved for the Academy Building were influenced by the Symbolist style popular in Europe at that time. Machell also supervised the woodworking school at Point Loma.

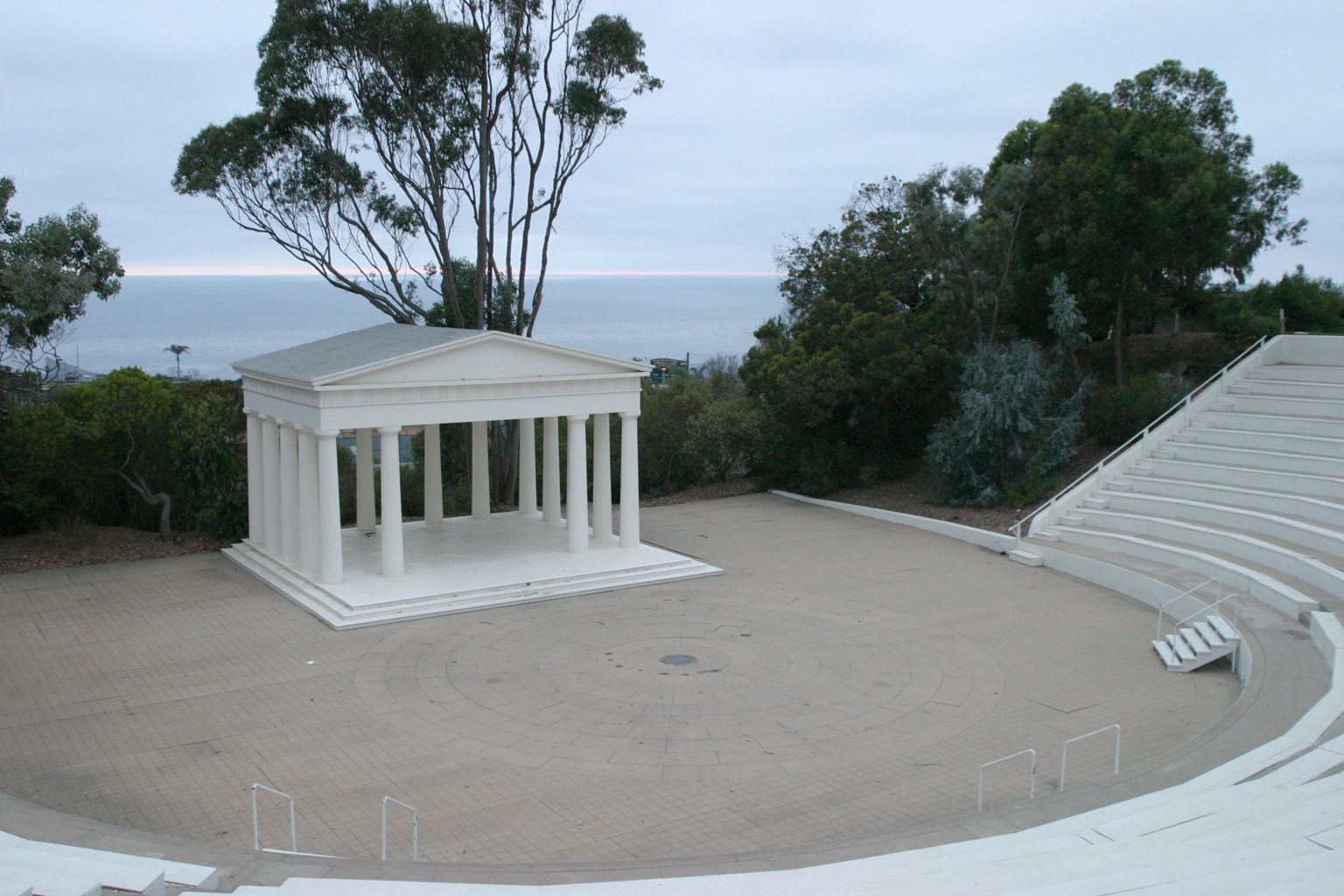
Greek theater

Lomaland had public buildings for the entire community and several private homes. The home of Albert Spalding, the sporting goods tycoon, was built in 1901. The building combines late-Victorian wooden architecture with historical motifs such as the modified Corinthian column (now shaped like a papyrus leaf) and flattened arches. The amethyst dome was restored by a team of scholars led by Dr. Dwayne Little of the PLNC department of History and Political Science in 1983. The first Greek theater in North America was built on this site in 1901. It was used for sporting events and theatrical performances. The tessellated pavement and stoa were added in 1909. The theatre was the site of a number of productions of Greek and Shakespearean dramas. Cabrillo Hall, which served as the International Center Headquarters, the Brotherhood Headquarters, and "Wachere Crest" building, was completed in 1909. It served as office space for the Theosophical Society and as a residence for Katherine Tingley after 1909. It was originally located on the west side of Pepper Tree lane. The hall is currently the location for the Communication Studies Department.

Lomaland dissolved in the aftermath of World War I and was used for bootlegging during the Prohibition period. The tunnel systems and site were later taken over by Fort Rosecrans before World War II. It served as an observation point and several barracks were installed on the site, which constitute some of the campus dormitories for PLNU. In 1952, California Western University relocated to Point Loma. In 1968, California Western changed its name to United States International University and moved to Scripps Ranch, while the California Western School of Law retained its old name and relocated from its Point Loma location to downtown in 1973. Pasadena College moved from Pasadena to Point Loma to replace it.

== Religious affiliation ==
PLNU is one of the eight U.S. liberal arts colleges and universities affiliated with the Church of the Nazarene. PLNU is the university for the "Southwest Region" of the United States, comprising the northern California, Sacramento, central California, Los Angeles, Anaheim, southern California, Arizona, New Mexico, and Hawaii districts, which include California, Arizona, New Mexico, Hawaii, and parts of Nevada, Utah, and Texas. Each college receives financial backing from the Nazarene churches on its region; part of each church budget is paid into a fund for its regional school. Each college or university is also bound by a gentlemen's agreement not to actively recruit outside its respective "educational region."

Point Loma Nazarene University offers many ministry opportunities including chapel, community and discipleship ministries, international and worship ministries. Attendance to chapel is based on the number of units the student is enrolled. Full-time students are required to attend chapel. Freshmen and sophomores must attend 33 chapels, and juniors and seniors must attend 25 chapels. If a student does not complete all of their chapel credits by the end of the semester, they will be fined for each chapel credit missed.

== Academics ==
In 2024, the university offered more than 60 academic programs in Bachelor of Arts and Bachelor of Science degrees as well as graduate degrees. In 2025, U.S. News & World Report reported that the university's most popular undergraduate majors included Business, Management, Marketing, and Related Support Services; Health Professions and Related Programs; Psychology; Family and Consumer Sciences/Human Sciences; and Biological and Biomedical Sciences. There were 4,494 students at the university in fall 2023, 3,158 of whom were undergraduate students.

In 2017, PLNU launched its first doctoral-level curriculum in the form of a Doctor of Nursing Practice program.

=== Accreditations ===
The university is accredited by the WASC Senior College and University Commission. Some programs and units at the university are accredited by specific organizations:

- Commission on Collegiate Nursing Education (School of Nursing, B.S., M.S., and D.N.P.)
- California Board of Registered Nursing
- Academy of Nutrition and Dietetics
- Accreditation Council for Business Schools and Programs (Fermanian School of Business)
- California Commission on Teacher Credentialing
- Commission on Accreditation of Athletic Training Education
- Council on Social Work Education
- National Association of Schools of Music

=== Rankings ===
Academic rankings

Regional
- U.S. News & World Report: 9

National
- Forbes: 263

In 2025, U.S. News & World Report ranked PLNU #16 (tie) among "Regional Universities West". Forbes ranked PLNU as #389 in the country among all universities as of 2019 and #93 in the West.

In 2024, Campus Pride included PLNU on its list of "America’s Worst Colleges and Universities for LGBTQ students." Reasons given were for censoring a screening of 1946: The Mistranslation That Shifted Culture and for tolerating hate speech and prejudicial behavior towards LGBTQ people.

== Student life ==
The institution has a debate team that won the National Parliamentary Debate Association championship in 2007 and met success as Sweepstakes Champions three times since 2003. PLNU has won the Christian College National Championship seven times since 1998.

PLNU's resources include an honors program, career services, and study abroad opportunities. PLNU hosts numerous denominational and local community events: arts & culture gatherings, outdoor activities, and faith and ministry opportunities.

== Athletics ==
The Point Loma Nazarene (PLNU) athletic teams are the Sea Lions. The university is a member of the Division II level of the National Collegiate Athletic Association (NCAA), primarily competing in the Pacific West Conference (PacWest) since the 2012–13 academic year. They were also a member of the National Christian College Athletic Association (NCCAA), primarily competing as an independent in the West Region of the Division I level. The Sea Lions previously competed in the Golden State Athletic Conference (GSAC) of the National Association of Intercollegiate Athletics (NAIA) from 1986–87 to 2011–12. Point Loma became an active member in the NCAA since the summer of 2014.

As of 2025, Point Loma had 44 sports teams including intramural and intercollegiate teams. The 11 intercollegiate varsity team include baseball, basketball, soccer, and tennis for men and basketball, cross country, golf, soccer, tennis, track & field, and volleyball for women. These teams have won 29 Pacwest championships and have included 46 All-American student-athletes.

== Notable alumni ==
Notable alumni include Edward J. Blakely, educator and researcher on urban and suburban issues, James Dobson, evangelical psychologist, Greg Laswell, musician and producer, Mildred Bangs Wynkoop, and Nazarene theologian. Alumni include four college presidents. Two were presidents of the Eastern Nazarene College: Fred J. Shields and Floyd W. Nease, 1919–1923 and 1924–1930, respectively. One, Orval J. Nease, was president of his alma mater from 1928 to 1933. The fourth, David Alexander, has been president of Northwest Nazarene since 2008.

Gospel hymn writer and publisher Haldor Lillenas attended the university. Hoku, singer and daughter of the late Don Ho, studied business at PLNU briefly, but left during her first semester. William De Los Santos, author, poet, screenwriter and motion-picture director, attended (enrolled as William Hilbert). Micah Albert, photojournalist who has covered issues in Africa and the Middle East, earned a degree in graphic communications. Robert Pierce, the evangelist who founded World Vision and Samaritan's Purse, studied on the Pasadena campus. Destin Daniel Cretton, a filmmaker, majored in communications. Dawson Daughtery and Luke Fabry of the band Almost Monday also attended Point Loma Nazarene University. Ally Beardsley, a regular member of the Dropout (streaming service) cast, attended and graduated Point Loma Nazarene University; the debt they accrued attending the college was a plot point for the 2019 web series Total Forgiveness.

Major League Baseball players Marty Decker, Mike Ekstrom, and Otto Kemp all played for Point Loma Nazarene University. Professional soccer player Steven Lenhart also attended the university.

Notable academics who attended PLNU include James Franklin Kay and Stanley E. Porter. In politics, Darlene Hooley was a former Democratic member of the U.S. House of Representatives from Oregon. Larry Alan Burns is a retired United States District Judge while other alumni such as Gregory C. Horn is a retired Rear Admiral of the United States Navy.

== Faculty ==
Notable faculty members include Frank G. Carver, Wesleyan Center Scholar in Residence; Darrel R. Falk, author of Coming to Peace with Science; and director of the Howard Hughes Medical Institute outreach program, Michael Lodahl. Another notable former faculty member is Olive Winchester.
