= General Superintendent (Church of the Nazarene) =

Highest elected office within the Church of the Nazarene

General Superintendent is the highest elected office within the Church of the Nazarene. General superintendents are elected by the General Assembly of the denomination for a four-year term to expire at the end of the next General Assembly.

== List of general superintendents ==
No.	Image	General Superintendent	Born - Died	Tenure	Ordained
1		Phineas F. Bresee	1838-1915	1907-1915	Levi Scott - 1861 - Methodist Episcopal Church
2		Hiram F. Reynolds	1854-1938	1907-1932	John Fletcher Hurst - 1886 - Methodist Episcopal Church
3		Edgar P. Ellyson	1869-1954	1908-1911	Hiram F. Reynolds - 1908 (credential recognized) - Southern California District
4		Edward F. Walker	1852-1918	1911-1918	Phineas F. Bresee - 1909 - (credential recognized) - Southern California District
5		William C. Wilson	1866-1915	1915	Hiram F. Reynolds - 1917 - Colorado District
6		John W. Goodwin	1869-1945	1916-1940	1905 - (credential recognized) - Southern California District
7		Roy T. Williams	1883-1946	1916-1946	Hiram F. Reynolds - 1908 - Kansas City District
8		J. B. Chapman	1884-1947	1928-1947	C. B. Jernigan and Johnnie Hill Jernigan - 1903 - Independent Holiness Church
9		Joseph G. Morrison	1871-1939	1936-1939	Hiram F. Reynolds - 1922 - (credential recognized) - North Dakota-Minnesota District
10		Howard V. Miller	1894-1948	1940-1948	John W. Goodwin - 1922 - (credential recognized) - New England District
11		Orval J. Nease	1891-1950	1940–1944, 1948-1950	Hiram F. Reynolds - 1918 - Southern California District
12		Hardy C. Powers	1900-1972	1944-1968	John W. Goodwin - 1928 - Southern California District
13		Gideon B. Williamson	1898-1981	1946-1968	John W. Goodwin - 1927 - Iowa District
14		Samuel Young	1901-1990	1948-1972	John W. Goodwin - 1931 - New England District
15		Daniel I. Vanderpool	1891-1988	1949-1964	Hiram F. Reynolds - 1922 - Colorado-Wyoming District
16		Hugh C. Benner	1899-1975	1952-1968	Roy T. Williams - 1923 - New England District Church of the Nazarene
17		V. H. Lewis	1912-2000	1960-1985	J. B. Chapman - 1935 - Rocky Mountain District Church of the Nazarene
18		George Coulter	1911-1995	1964-1985	Roy T. Williams - 1934 - Alberta District Church of the Nazarene
19		Edward G. Lawlor	1907-1987	1968-1976	Roy T. Williams - 1936 - Manitoba-Saskatchewan District
20		Eugene L. Stowe	1922-2020	1968-1993	J. B. Chapman - 1945 - Northern California District
21		Orville W. Jenkins	1913-2007	1968-1985	Joseph G. Morrison - 1939 - Northern California District
22		Charles H. Strickland	1916-1988	1972-1988	Orval J. Nease - 1941 - Georgia District
23		William M. Greathouse	1919-2011	1976-1989	J.B. Chapman - 1943 - Tennessee District
24		Jerald D. Johnson	1927-2020	1980-1997	D. I. Vanderpool - 1950 - Northwest District Church of the Nazarene
25		Raymond W. Hurn	1921-2007	1985-1993	Howard V. Miller - 1943 - Kansas District Church of the Nazarene
26		John A. Knight	1931-2009	1985-2001	Hugh C. Benner - 1954 - Tennessee District Church of the Nazarene
27		Donald D. Owens	1926-	1989-1997	Samuel Young - 1952 - Northwest Oklahoma District Church of the Nazarene
28		William J. Prince	1930-2012	1989-2001	Gideon B. Williamson - 1957 - Los Angeles District Church of the Nazarene
29		James H. Diehl	1937-2025	1993-2009	Hardy C. Powers - 1960 - Iowa District Church of the Nazarene
30		Paul G. Cunningham	1937-2020	1993-2009	Hugh C. Benner - 1965
31		Jerry D. Porter	1949-	1997-2017	Charles Strickland - 1974 - Houston District Church of the Nazarene
32		Jim L. Bond	1936-	1997-2005	Hardy C. Powers - 1962 - Kansas City District Church of the Nazarene
33		W. Talmadge Johnson	1937-2023	2001-2005	Hugh C. Benner - 1958 - Southwest Oklahoma District Church of the Nazarene
34		Jesse C. Middendorf	1942-	2001-2013	V. H. Lewis - 1969 - Tennessee District Church of the Nazarene
35		Nina G. Gunter	1937-	2005-2009	Hugh C. Benner - 1960 - Joplin District Church of the Nazarene
36		J. K. Warrick	1945-	2005-2017	S. George Coulter - 1970 - Southeast Oklahoma District Church of the Nazarene
37		Eugenio Duarte	1953-	2009-2023	Orville W. Jenkins - 1981 - Cabo Verde District Church of the Nazarene
38		David W. Graves	1953-	2009-2023	William M. Greathouse - 1980 - North Carolina District Church of the Nazarene
39		Stan Toler	1950-2017	2009-2013	Charles H. Strickland - 1985 (credential recognized) - Northwest Oklahoma District Church of the Nazarene
40		David A. Busic	1964-	2013-	John A. Knight - 1991 - Kansas City District Church of the Nazarene
41		Gustavo A. Crocker	1963-	2013-	Paul G. Cunningham - 2003 - Mid-Atlantic District Church of the Nazarene
42		Filimão M. Chambo	1971-	2017-	James H. Diehl - 2000 - South Africa RSA Gauteng District Church of the Nazarene
43		Carla Sunberg	1961-	2017-	James H. Diehl - 2004 - Russia North District Church of the Nazarene
44		T. Scott Daniels	1966-	2023-	Raymond W. Hurn - 1992 - Washington Pacific District Church of the Nazarene
45		Christian D. Sarmiento	1956-	2023-	Jerald D. Johnson - 1989 - Kansas City District Church of the Nazarene
