= Mount Vernon Nazarene University =

Christian university in Mount Vernon, Ohio, U.S.

- Seal of Mount Vernon Nazarene University
- Former names: Zone A College (1964–1968); Mount Vernon Nazarene College (1968–2002)
- Motto: "To Seek to Learn is to Seek to Serve"
- Type: Private university
- Established: 1968
- Religious affiliation: Church of the Nazarene
- Academic affiliations: CCCU, NCACS
- Endowment: $26.8 million
- President: Carson Castleman
- Students: 1,941
- Undergraduates: 1,628
- Postgraduates: 313
- Location: Mount Vernon, Ohio, U.S. 40.3737°N 82.4748°W
- Campus: 327 Acres; Rural
- Colors: Green & Blue
- Nickname: Cougars
- Sporting affiliations: NAIA – Crossroads; NCCAA Division I – Midwest
- Mascot: Casey the Cougar
- Website: www.mvnu.edu

Mount Vernon Nazarene University (MVNU) is a private Christian university in Mount Vernon, Ohio, United States, with satellite locations in the surrounding area. It was founded in 1968 by the Church of the Nazarene and offers a variety of bachelor's and master's degrees.

== History ==
The result of a 1960 education commission, Mount Vernon Nazarene was first chartered as the Zone A College of the Church of the Nazarene in 1964 by the church's General Assembly. A site in the town of Mount Vernon was chosen in 1966 for its proximity to a concentrated Nazarene population, and Mount Vernon Nazarene College (MVNC) opened in 1968 on the old Lakeholm Farm property that had belonged to The Ohio State University.

The Lakeholm Farm was the former home of Columbus Delano, US Secretary of the Interior under Ulysses S. Grant. Three buildings (Manor, Ice House, and Barn), original to Lakeholm Farm, are still in operation on the campus today. Originally a two-year junior college, MVNU became a four-year school in 1974, was accredited for two-year degrees in 1972 and four-year degrees in 1974, and graduate degrees in Christian ministry were added in 1991. It was renamed Mount Vernon Nazarene University (MVNU) in 2002.

The town of Mount Vernon was just one of many sites proposed for the college, but it raised US$209,000 to purchase a 209-acre (85 ha) portion of the Lakeholm Farm before the Church of the Nazarene bought it from The Ohio State University, which owned the property. The colonial-style buildings were designed to resemble Williamsburg, Virginia. Nine acres were added by Mary Starr in 1970 and the college acquired a neighboring 128-acre (0.52 km^{2}) farm in 1999.

MVNU is a co-educational university with an evangelical Christian foundation and mission. It is part of the Church of the Nazarene's East Central District, and much of its educational philosophy is based on the Wesleyan-Arminian holiness tradition. The university motto is: "To Seek to Learn is to Seek to Serve."

Presidents
Stephen W. Nease	1968–1972
John A. Knight	1972–1975
L. Guy Nees	1975–1980
William J. Prince	1980–1989
E. LeBron Fairbanks	1989–2007
Daniel J. Martin	2007–2012
Henry W. Spaulding II	2012–2023
Carson Castleman	2023–present

MVNU's current president, Carson Castleman, has been accused of misconduct, creating a hostile work environment, curtailing the academic freedom of faculty, and failing to communicate with stakeholders by former employees and alumni. In January 2025, the faculty of MVNU passed a no-confidence motion against him by a vote of 43-13 (13 abstaining). The board continues to support Castleman.

== Organization and affiliation ==
MVNU is one of eight US colleges and universities affiliated with the Church of the Nazarene. MVNU is the university for the Nazarene East Central Region of the United States, which comprises the Northwestern Ohio, North Central Ohio, East Ohio, Southwestern Ohio, South Central Ohio, Eastern Kentucky, West Virginia North, and West Virginia South districts (all of Ohio, part of Kentucky, and all of West Virginia).

The trustees of the university, organized in 1966, are representatives from each of these Ohio, Kentucky, and West Virginia districts. Each institution receives financial backing from the Nazarene churches in its region; part of each church budget is paid into a fund for its regional school. Each college or university is also bound by a gentlemen's agreement not to actively recruit outside its respective educational region.

MVNU is accredited by the Higher Learning Commission and all of its academic programs are submitted to the Ohio Board of Regents for approval. The university is a member of the Association of Independent Colleges and Universities of Ohio, the Council for Christian Colleges and Universities, the Council for Higher Education, and the Ohio Foundation of Independent Colleges.

== Campus ==
MVNU's main campus is along the southern edge of Mount Vernon, Ohio. The campus consists of over fifteen different classrooms and residence buildings. The main classroom buildings are Faculty Hall, Regents Hall, Founders Hall, The Clarence and Jennie K. Moore Center, and Jetter Hall. Freshmen entering the school live in one of three dorms: Pioneer for first-year women, Oakwood for first-year men, and Galloway (co-ed.) Students who are beyond their, first year can stay in Galloway Hall, Redwood Hall, or move to one of the apartment complexes on campus. These apartments are Cedar, Birch, and Cypress (upperclassmen and women) and Maplewood (upperclassmen), Elmwood (upperclasswomen), Rosewood, and Spruce (upperclassmen and women).

Other buildings on campus include the R.R. Hodges Chapel, Hyson Campus Center, Ariel Arena and the Prince Student Union, and Hunter Hall, The Stephen W. Nease Center, and the Buchwald Center in downtown Mount Vernon. The R.R. Hodges Chapel is where most chapel services take place on campus and is also the center of all music and performing arts classes and performances. Hyson Campus Center houses the Dining Commons, the Student Life offices, the campus post office, and several classrooms. Ariel Arena is MVNU's athletics facility, opened on November 8, 2013. Connected to the arena is the Prince Student Union, which houses the campus cafe, "The Den.”

MVNU also owns several buildings in downtown Mount Vernon. The first of these is Hunter Hall, which houses the university's nursing program and Happy Bean Coffee Shop. This building now contains high-tech educational technology and simulation equipment for nursing students as well as Hunter Hall Clinic for Communication Sciences and Disorders. Next door to Hunter Hall is Buchwald Center, open since 2009, which contains classrooms for Fine Art and Graphic Design majors and the Schnormeier Art Gallery. A couple buildings down is The Stephen W. Nease Center that houses MVNU's Department of Engineering. The H.W. Hub, in the basement level of 18 East Vine Street, will open in the Fall 2025 semester. This building was formerly the Mount Vernon News Building and will house part of the Engineering department and the Computer Science department.

== Academics ==
=== Traditional undergraduate ===
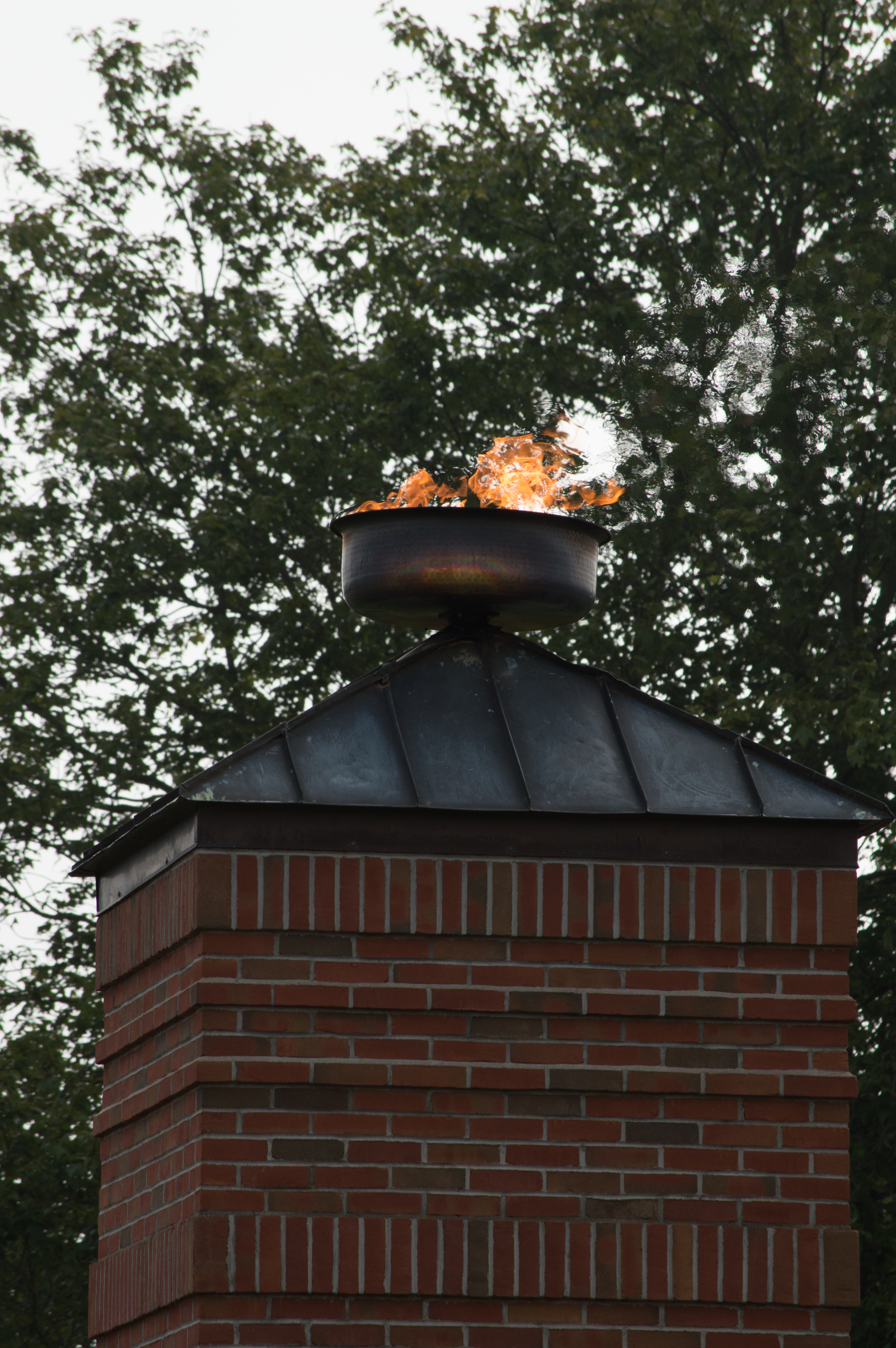
MVNU's Eternal Flame

MVNU has programs for traditional students, graduate students, and working adults. 88% of all degrees awarded are bachelor's degrees and the fall 2018 acceptance rate for undergraduate students who applied to the university was 75.8%. The student-to-faculty ratio is 16:1 and 68% of full-time professors hold a terminal degree. Many of the faculty members completed their training at one of the other Nazarene institutions of higher education. In 2018, the retention rate was 79% and the average ACT score of MVNU students was 23.

MVNU is organized into six schools: Arts and Humanities, Business, Education and Professional Studies, Theology and Philosophy, Nursing and Health Sciences, and Natural and Social Sciences. Within these six schools the university offers a variety of degree programs for traditional undergraduate students. The five most popular majors on campus are Business, Nursing, Education, Biology, and Engineering.

=== Graduate and Professional Studies Program ===
The Graduate and Professional Studies Program (GPS) is for non-traditional students and offers associate's, bachelor's, master's, and doctoral degrees. Mount Vernon Nazarene University offered its first Bachelor of Business Administration (BBA) degree program designed for adults to 22 students at the Mount Vernon campus in 1993. By 1995, MVNU added a second site at Polaris Parkway in Columbus. Today, nearly 800 students are enrolled in Graduate and Professional Studies programs (GPS) through MVNU's fully online platform. Five BBA concentrations are now offered as well as undergraduate degrees in social work, leadership, ministry leadership, public administration, education, and nursing; graduate degrees in business, education, and ministry; general studies courses, and certificate programs in education and ministry. In 2024, MVNU launched its first fully accredited doctoral program in Nursing Practice. Many additional online degree programs are available.

== WNZR ==
WNZR, operating at a frequency of 90.9 FM MHz, signed on the air in October 1986. The station is owned and operated by Mount Vernon Nazarene University. The station's studios are located in Founders Hall and are part of the university's Communication Department and the School of Arts and Humanities. WNZR's broadcast tower and transmitter building are located off of Glen Road on the east end of the campus. The station serves a dual purpose as a laboratory for radio broadcasting classes and a broadcast ministry of MVNU.

WNZR is licensed by the Federal Communications Commission as a non-commercial educational (NCE) station, and is located in the NCE range of the FM bandwidth. WNZR was originally licensed to operate around 140 watts. In May 2008, the station was approved for a power increase up to 1300 watts and went live with a new transmitter on May 21, 2010. WNZR's signal now reaches into bordering counties (Licking, Morrow, and Richland). WNZR also streams online at www.wnzr.fm and has a smartphone app available on both the Google Play/Android platform and on the iTunes App Store.

WNZR is funded through support from the university's general academic budget, donations from listeners, and underwriting support from area businesses and organizations. It operates 24 hours a day, seven days a week, 365 days a year, broadcasting primarily an Adult Contemporary (AC) Christian music format, along with a variety of Christian teaching programs and athletic events.

== Student life ==
Enrollment in 2018 consisted of 2,243 students, 1,405 of whom were traditional and 838 non-traditional undergraduates. 15% of students represented racial minorities, 92% of students were from the state of Ohio, 23% were associated with the Church of the Nazarene, 63% were female, and 36% were male. 72% of students lived on campus.

While on campus, students participate in student-led small groups, chapel services, mission trips, and community service groups organized and directed by upperclassmen. Counseling, Career Services, and Student Health Services are available to students at no cost.

The Student Government Association (SGA) is responsible for many of the events that take place on campus. It consists of 13 members who are responsible for various aspects of community life, from planning events to influencing policies on important issues. These members are elected yearly by the student body and include a president of each class, social, community and spiritual life, and other areas. Members of the SGA participate in meetings with the board of trustees, faculty, staff, and administration. In past years, the SGA has been responsible for the end of the year Block Party and a change in policy that allowed more open dorm hours for the residence halls and apartment living areas.

Some campus events and traditions that take place annually are Welcome Week, Oaktoberfest, SonFest, and Block Party. Welcome Week includes activities such as a luau and dime-a-dog for sporting events. Oaktoberfest takes place on the lawn in front of Oakwood Hall and features hay rides, s'mores, and pumpkin carving. SonFest is one of the region's largest Christian music concerts, with yearly attendance numbering in the thousands. Taking place on the campus of MVNU, the event has previously featured popular artists that include Family Force Five, Plumb, Building 429, Switchfoot, and Lecrae. The Block Party is held to celebrate the end of the year and is hosted by the SGA. Loud music and outdoor games are signature attractions of this event.

== Athletics ==
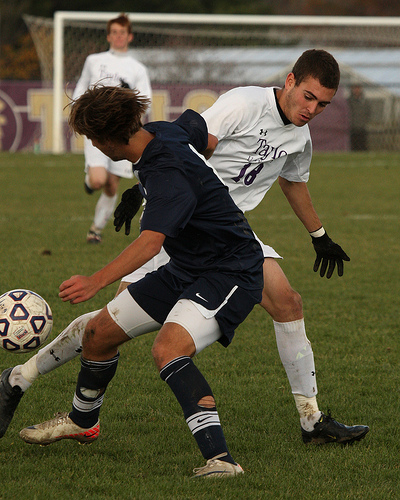
Mount Vernon soccer match in 2013

The MVNU athletic teams are the Cougars. The university is a member of the National Association of Intercollegiate Athletics (NAIA), primarily competing in the Crossroads League (formerly known as the Mid-Central College Conference (MCCC) until after the 2011–12 school year) since the 2011–12 academic year. The Cougars previously competed in the defunct American Mideast Conference from 1975–76 to 2010–11.

MVNU competes in 21 varsity sports: Men's sports include baseball, basketball, bowling, cross country, golf, lacrosse, soccer, tennis, track & field and volleyball; while women's sports include basketball, bowling, cross country, golf, lacrosse, soccer, softball, tennis, track & field and volleyball; and co-ed sports include cheerleading and eSports.

MVNU has added men's volleyball as a varsity sport for the 2020–21 season, with the sport spending the 2019–20 season as a club sport. MVNU also supports a wide variety of intramural sports, such as tennis, softball, sand volleyball, indoor volleyball and flag football.

=== Facilities ===
MVNU hosts most of its sports at on-campus facilities, the newest of which is Ariel Arena. Opened in 2013, the arena was funded by the Ariel Corporation and is named for it. The main arena seats 2,100 for athletic events and 3,000 for concerts, performances and other events. The arena is attached to MVNU's older gymnasium, formerly known as the Physical Education Center, which provides auxiliary courts for practices. The arena also hosts a cardio center, weight room, athletics offices and classrooms. MVNU also has a baseball field built next to Ariel Arena, and a softball field and tennis courts found west of Martinsburg Road.

In addition to current facilities, MVNU has begun (2019) construction on a new soccer and lacrosse complex on the north side of campus. The new facility will feature a turf field, lights, grandstand seating for 500 spectators, locker rooms and additional amenities. The project is part of a larger community area that will include five grass soccer fields, and is built next to a new indoor facility being built by Mount Vernon High School. MVNU and MVHS will share access to both the soccer and lacrosse stadium and the indoor facility.

=== Accomplishments ===
In the 2018–19 season, MVNU saw great success on the field. The Cougars' men's basketball program returned to the NAIA Division II National Tournament for the first time since 2009, reaching the second round. MVNU also had a number of NAIA All-Americans, most notably Mitchell Soviak, who won the NAIA Men's Outdoor Track and Field National Championship in shot put.

== Notable alumni ==
- Tim Belcher, former Major League Baseball pitcher
- Tori Geib, chef and cancer patient advocate
- Tim Ginter, politician, member of the Ohio House of Representatives
- Marty McLeary, former Major League Baseball pitcher
- Floyd Nease, politician, former member of the Vermont House of Representatives
