= MidAmerica Nazarene University =

Christian university in Olathe, Kansas, US

- Former name: Mid-America Nazarene College (1966–1996)
- Motto: To Learn, to Serve, to Be
- Type: Private university
- Established: 1966
- Religious affiliation: Nazarene
- Academic affiliations: CCCU, NAICU, NCACS
- President: Jon D. North
- Students: 1,500 (fall 2023)
- Undergraduates: 1,000 (fall 2023)
- Postgraduates: 500 (fall 2023)
- Location: Olathe, Kansas, United States; 38.874160°N 94.783120°W
- Campus: Suburban
- Colors: Red, white and blue
- Nickname: Pioneers
- Sporting affiliations: NAIA – HAAC
- Mascot: Pioneer
- Website: mnu.edu
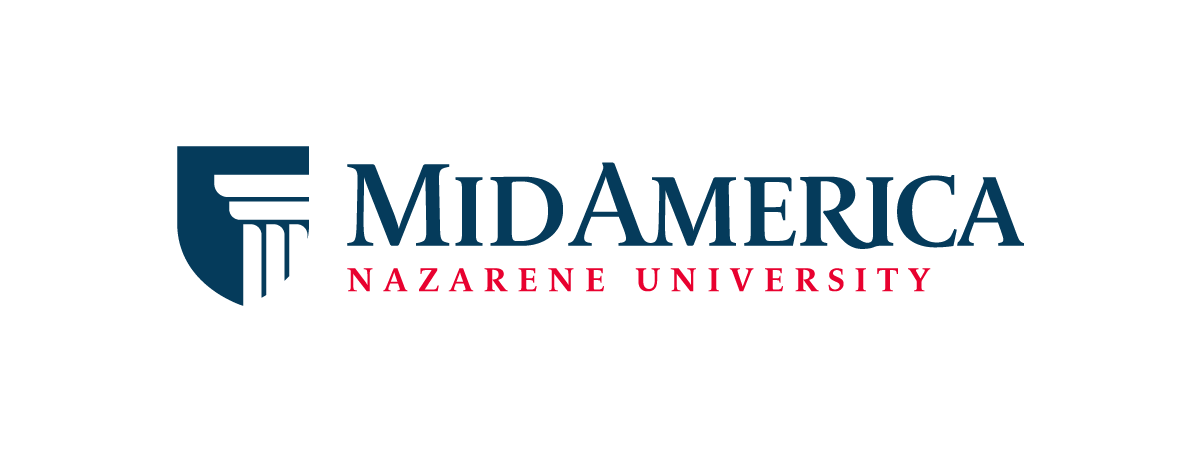

MidAmerica Nazarene University (MNU) is a private Nazarene (evangelical Christian) university in Olathe, Kansas, United States. It was established in 1966.

== History ==
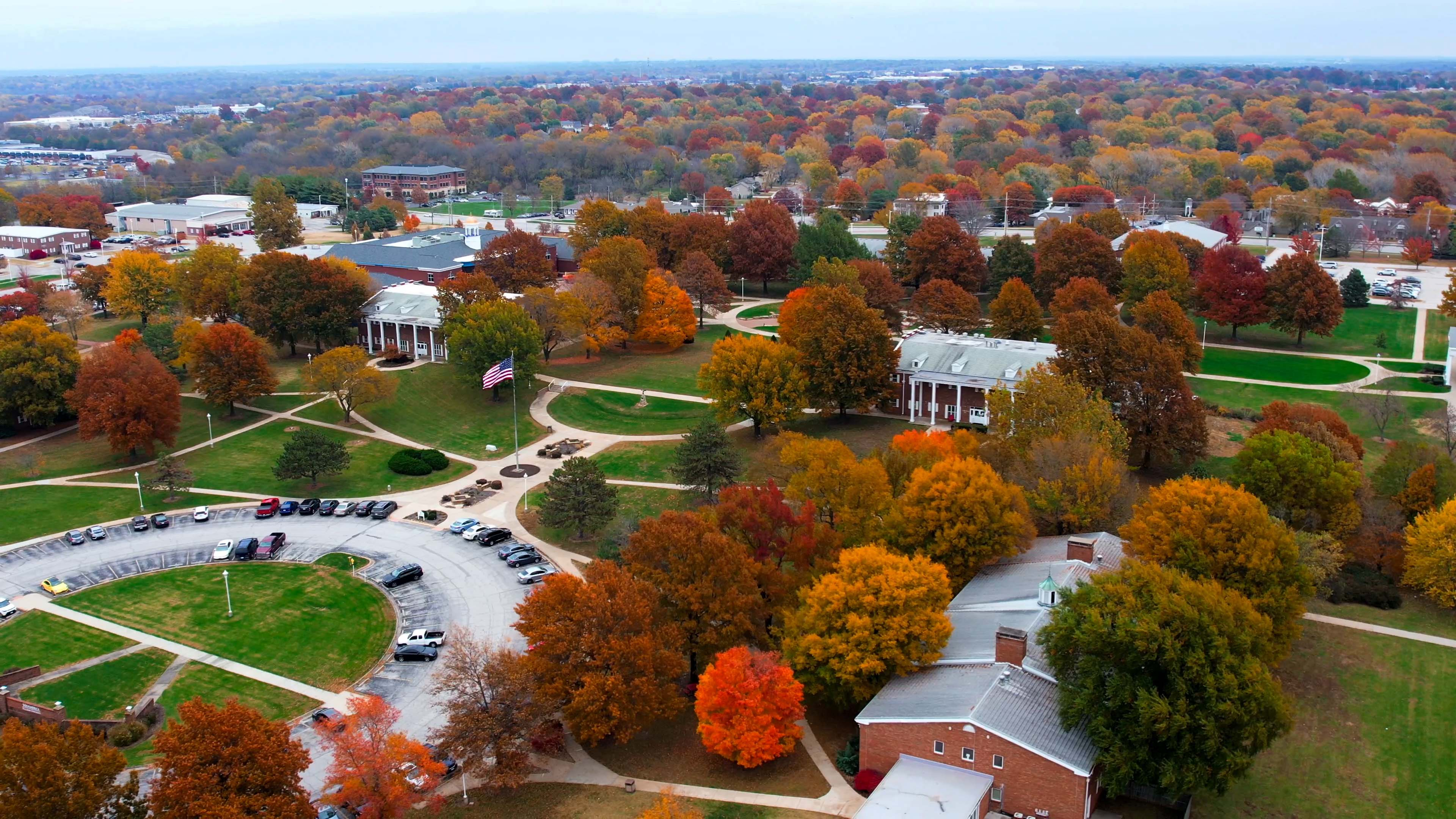
MidAmerica Nazarene University Campus

Mid-America Nazarene College (MANC) was founded in 1966. In 1996 Mid-America Nazarene College formally changed its name to MidAmerica Nazarene University (MNU).

== Campus ==
The 105-acre (42 ha) campus is located at 2030 East College Way, Olathe, Kansas, United States. The land was donated by Robert R. Osborne, a retired banker. Proposed sites for the college also included Wichita, Topeka, and Ottawa, Kansas.

== Affiliations ==
As one of eight U.S. self-described "liberal arts colleges" affiliated with the Church of the Nazarene, the college receives financial backing from the Nazarene churches in its region. Part of each church budget is paid in to a fund for its regional school. Each college is also bound by a gentlemen's agreement not to actively recruit outside its respective educational region. MNU is the college for the North Central Region of the United States, which comprises the Dakota-Minnesota (Minnesota, North Dakota, South Dakota), Nebraska, Kansas, Iowa, Kansas City, Joplin, and Missouri districts.

MNU is a member of the Council for Christian Colleges and Universities and the National Association of Independent Colleges and Universities. MNU has been accredited by the Commission on Institutions of Higher Education of the North Central Association of Colleges and Schools (now the Higher Learning Commission) since 1974.

== Academics ==
MNU offers undergraduate degrees in more than 50 majors, and seven graduate degrees in nursing, counseling, education and business. The academic calendar is on a semester system. There were 1,500 students at the university in 2023.

== Athletics ==
The MidAmerica Nazarene (MNU) athletic teams are called the Pioneers. Their official colors are scarlet, white, and navy blue. The university is a member of the National Association of Intercollegiate Athletics (NAIA), primarily competing in the Heart of America Athletic Conference (HAAC) since the 1980–81 academic year.

MNU competes in 18 intercollegiate varsity sports: Men's sports include baseball, basketball, cross country, football, golf, soccer and track & field (indoor and outdoor); while women's sports include basketball, cross country, golf, soccer, softball, track & field (indoor and outdoor) and volleyball; and co-ed sports include cheerleading, drumline and weightlifting.

=== Facilities ===
MNU's athletic facilities include Cook Center (men's and women's basketball, and volleyball in the Bell Family Arena), Land Gym (intramurals), MNU Soccer Field, Pioneer Stadium (torn down summer 2012), Robbie Jones Field at Dixon Stadium (baseball), and Williams Field (softball).

=== Men's basketball ===
The men's basketball team won the NAIA Division II basketball championship in 2007 and was the runner up in 2001. The team has been coached by Rocky Lamar (a 1976 MNU graduate) since 1986. It placed second in the NCCAA men's basketball championships in 1997 and 1998. Including its NAIA title games it has appeared in the Final Four in 2001, 2006, 2007, 2008 and 2009. It moved up to Division I in 2009. The court in the Bell Family Arena is named “Rocky Lamar Court.”.

=== Women's basketball ===
The women's basketball team, coached by Jon Lewis, won the NAIA Division I National Basketball Championship in 2016.

== Student life ==
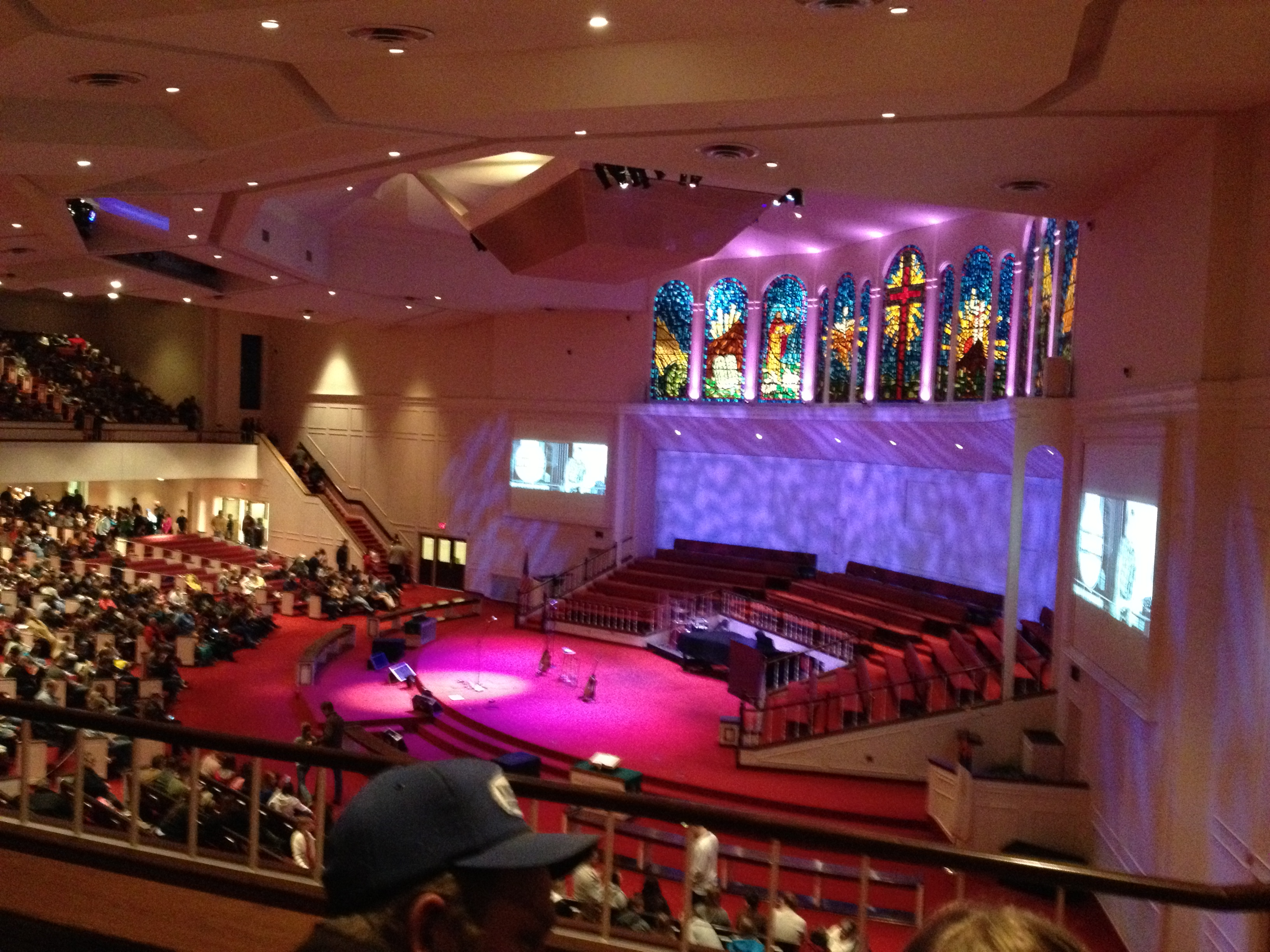
Interior of sanctuary of College Nazarene Church on campus (2013)

Enrollment comprises approximately 1,000 undergraduate and 500 graduate students, mostly from the North Central United States. Men and women are fairly equal in number. Over 25 percent of undergraduate students are over 25 years old. Members of the traditional undergraduate population who do not live locally with relatives must reside in campus housing. Traditional undergraduate students also attend chapel services and must follow the university lifestyle policy. Students participate in religious and service organizations, student leadership, musical and theatrical groups, intramural sports, and varsity sports.

== Notable people ==
- Shayna Baszler — professional wrestler and former mixed martial artist
- Robyn Essex — politician
- Donald Owens — president of MNU (1985-1989) and general superintendent Church of the Nazarene (1989-1997)
- Tammie Jo Shults — pilot
- Vince Snowbarger — politician
- Randall Stephens — author and historian
