= Southern Nazarene University =

Christian college in Bethany, Oklahoma, US

- Former names: List: Texas Holiness University (1899–1906); Beulah Heights Academy and Bible School (1906–1909); Oklahoma Holiness College (1909–1918); Oklahoma Nazarene College (1918–1920); Bethany-Peniel College (1920–1955); Bethany Nazarene College (1955–1986)
- Motto: "Character, Culture, Christ"
- Type: Private university
- Established: 1899; 127 years ago
- Religious affiliation: Nazarene
- Academic affiliations: CCCU, NAICU, NCACS, Space-grant
- Endowment: $59.1 million (2024)
- President: J. Keith Newman
- Students: 2,110
- Undergraduates: 1,656
- Postgraduates: 454
- Location: Bethany, Oklahoma, U.S. 35.5139°N 97.6309°W
- Campus: Suburban, 200 acres (0.81 km^{2})
- Colors: Crimson & White
- Nickname: Crimson Storm
- Sporting affiliations: NCAA Division II – Great American Conference
- Website: snu.edu
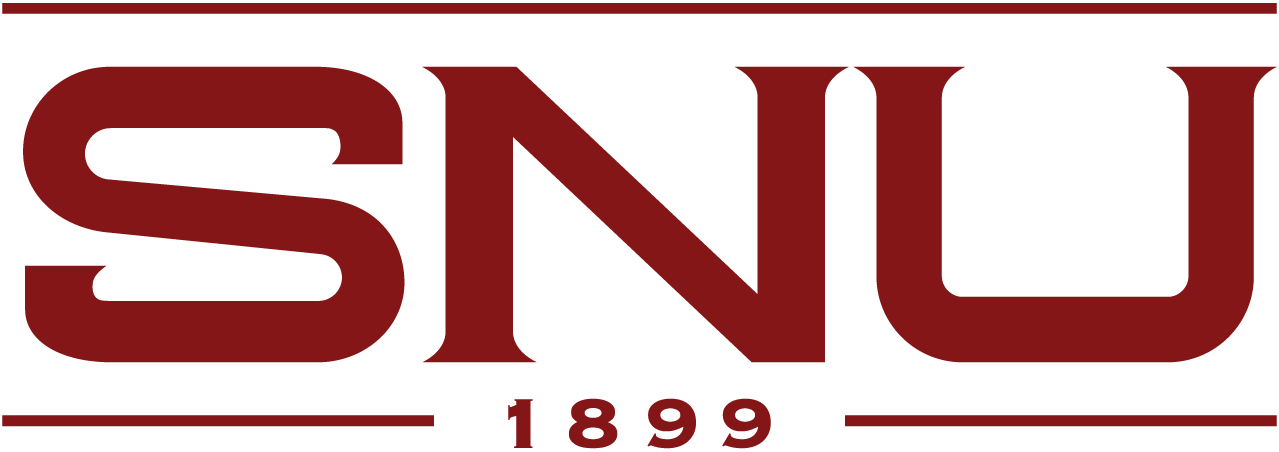

Southern Nazarene University (SNU) is a private Nazarene university in Bethany, Oklahoma, United States.

== History ==
The history of the institution is one of various mergers and, therefore, one of differing institutions. While SNU claims its founding date as 1899, that founding date refers to an institution that merged with what is now SNU: Texas Holiness University. As an Oklahoman institution, SNU dates back to 1906, with the founding of the Beulah Heights Academy and Bible School.

The roots of the original Southern Nazarene University are primarily in an orphanage of downtown Oklahoma City, founded by Miss Mattie Mallory. Mallory used her inheritance to buy property north of the city, which she named Beulah Heights, and relocated the orphanage there. Then, in 1906, the "Beulah Heights Academy and Bible School" opened. In 1909, the school was renamed "Oklahoma Holiness College" and new property was purchased to the west of Oklahoma City in Bethany. That same year the surrounding holiness community became Nazarene and, as its church base swelled, the school's financial problems "proved less threatening than those at other institutions". The school eventually changed its name in 1918 to "Oklahoma Nazarene College", when the first Nazarene Educational Regions were established.

When Peniel College merged with Oklahoma Nazarene College in 1920, the name changed to "Bethany-Peniel College". Peniel was the first of four fellow Nazarene institutions that would be absorbed by the Oklahoma school. The second institution was Central Nazarene College, another Nazarene school in Texas, in 1929. Two years later, Arkansas Holiness College was absorbed by Bethany-Peniel. The last merger was with Bresee Theological College, in 1940. As historian Timothy L. Smith wrote, "It eventually outdistanced and absorbed the schools at Hutchinson, Kansas, Peniel and Hamlin, Texas, Vilonia, Arkansas, and Des Arc, Missouri. Bethany became the Nazarene center for the whole Southwest."

In 1955, the name changed again from Bethany-Peniel College to "Bethany Nazarene College" (BNC) to avoid confusion with the term "penal" or "penal colony", and again in 1986, from Bethany Nazarene College to "Southern Nazarene University" (SNU).

SNU was placed on the American Association of University Professors's list of censured institutions in 1987 after eight faculty members were irregularly terminated in 1986. Discrepancies in the reasons for their termination led the AAUP to investigate: the initial reason given was that of financial difficulty on the part of the institution, due to a decline in student retention and the resulting drop in enrollment, while the reason given later was one of unspecified performance deficiencies in the terminated faculty members. SNU eventually offered some of the terminated faculty members monetary compensation but remained on the list for 18 years, until its administration had drafted academic tenure procedures that met AAUP standards. In 2005, the American Association of University Professors took SNU off its censure list.

Southern Nazarene University was granted an exception to Title IX in 2016 which allows it to legally discriminate against LGBT students for religious reasons.

== Campus ==
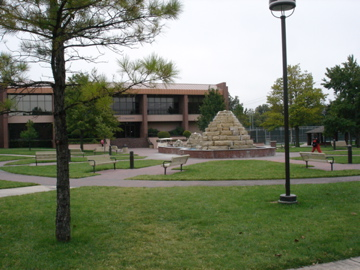
Centennial Plaza

The main campus is located in Bethany, Oklahoma. Since 1990, SNU has also maintained a presence in Tulsa, providing adult and professional programs. Buildings with excavated basements on the Bethany campus have a history of being opened up to shelter area locals during tornado warnings.

== Affiliations ==
SNU is one of seven regional U.S. liberal arts colleges affiliated with the Church of the Nazarene. SNU represents the "South Central Region." In terms of the Church of the Nazarene, the "South Central Region" comprises the North Arkansas, South Arkansas, Louisiana, Oklahoma, Northeast Oklahoma, Southwest Oklahoma, Texas-Oklahoma Latin, North/East Texas, South Texas, and West Texas districts which cover Arkansas, Louisiana, Oklahoma, and Texas. Each college receives financial backing from the Nazarene churches on its region; part of each church budget is paid into a fund for its regional school. Each college or university is also bound by a gentlemen's agreement not to actively recruit outside its respective "educational region".

Southern Nazarene is a member of the Council for Christian Colleges and Universities (CCCU) and the National Association of Independent Colleges and Universities (NAICU). SNU has also been accredited by the North Central Association of Colleges and Schools since 1956.

== Academics ==
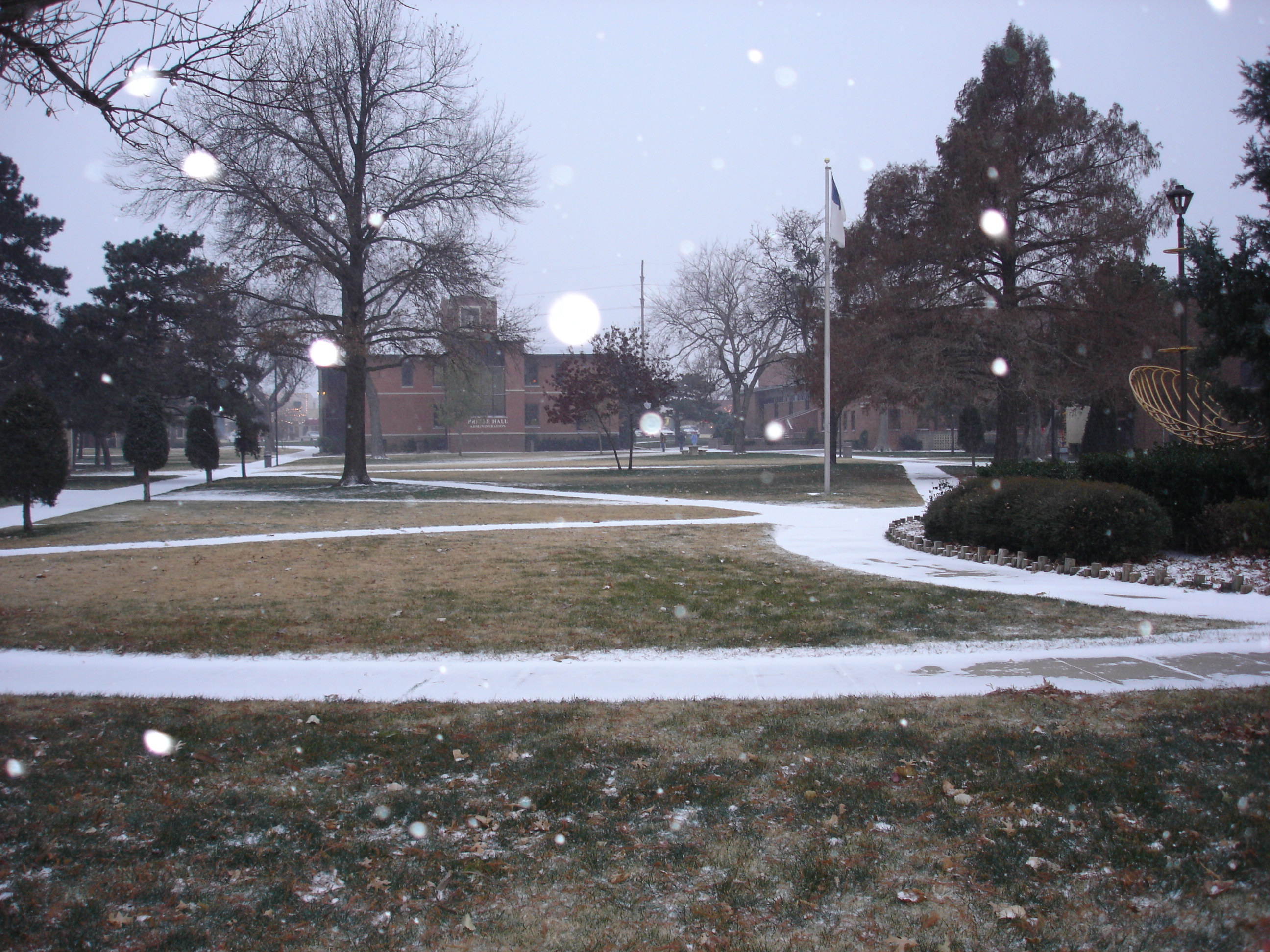
Campus Mall in winter

SNU provides students undergraduate degree options in several different fields of interest. It also offers three graduate degrees and seven professional programs for adults. Southern Nazarene is an open admissions college that does not require applicants to provide grades or standardized test scores; the 2007 acceptance rate for students who applied to the college was 47 percent.

== Student life ==
SNU provides on-campus apartments and various dormitories. All students under the age of 22 must live on-campus, although exceptions are made for local students living with families. The housing options include Bracken Hall and Chapman Apartments for upperclassmen,

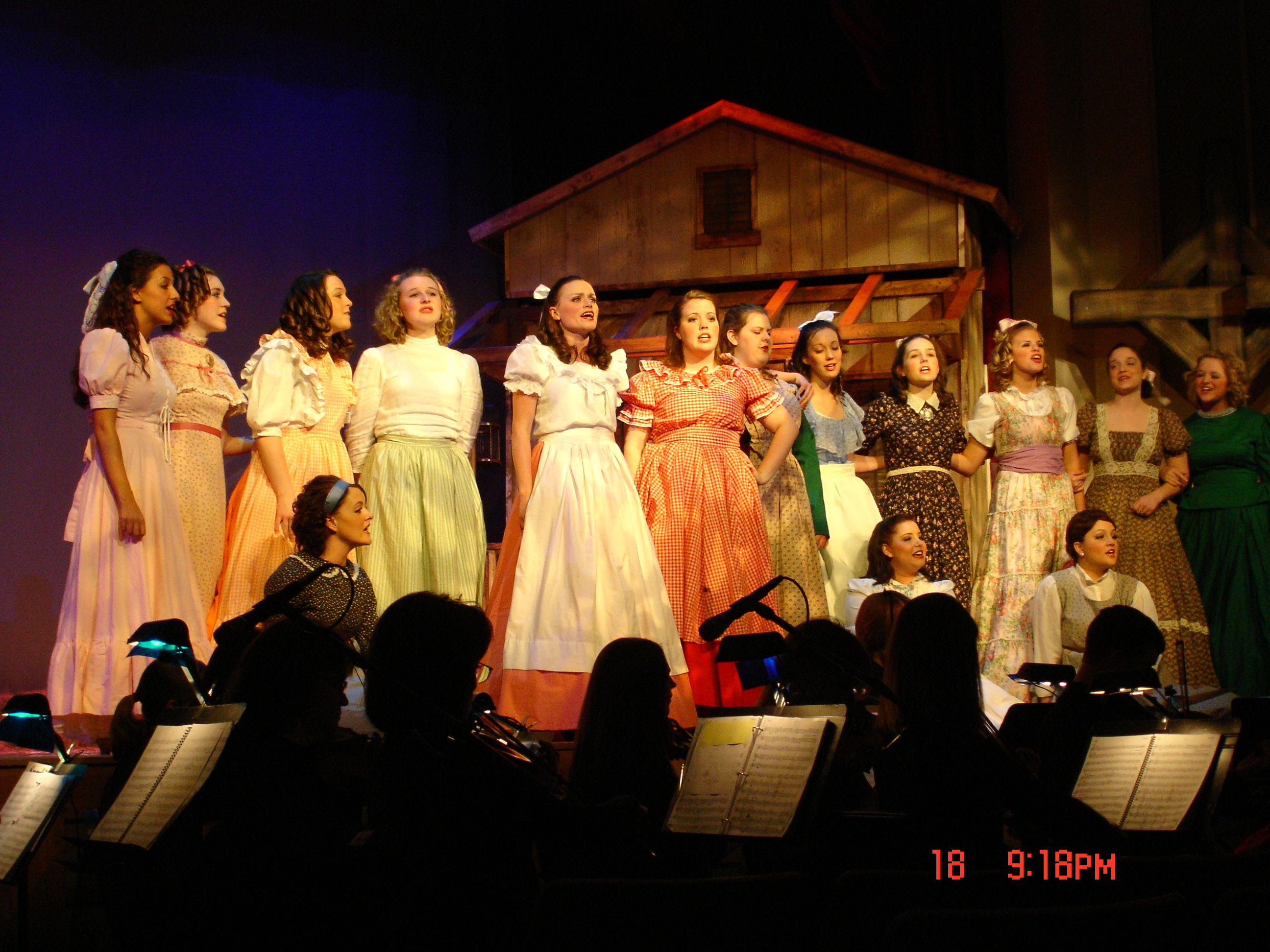
Oklahoma! in 2006

As at most Christian colleges, there is an emphasis on spiritual development at SNU. The Office of Spiritual Development is presided over by a Vice President (VP) of Spiritual Development and Chapel services take place each Tuesday and Thursday in Herrick Auditorium. Students are required to go to 25 of 30 chapels offered. There are also alternative chapel credit opportunities available to students: small groups, a student led testimony service, and community service. Chapel speakers and musical groups are arranged by the VP of Spiritual Development. The Office of Spiritual Development work with the SGA Campus Ministries leaders to provide special class chapels and spiritual life retreats.

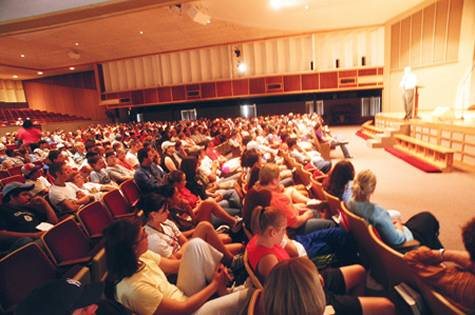
Inside Herrick Auditorium

The Student Government Association (SGA) coordinates events and services for students. The SGA is broken up into four councils executives: Campus Ministries, Athletic Relations, Publicity, Social Life, Finance, and Presidents, along with the editors for the two SNU publications the campus newspaper, The Echo, formerly The Reveille Echo, and the campus yearbook, The Arrow. Each SGA "exec", preside over sub-councils and have a representative on the class level. The SGA councils are responsible for hosting school activities, including the SNL (Southern Nazarene Live) talent contest, T.W.I.R.P., Heart-Pal Banquet, Junior-Senior Banquet, class chapels, and class parties.

SNU is listed among the "Absolute Worst Campuses for LGBTQ Youth" in the US by Campus Pride due to the previously mentioned partial Title IX exemption.

=== Motto ===
The motto of SNU is "Character, Culture, Christ". This was first used in 1931 in a student publication called The Reflector. In 1948, under the presidency of Roy H. Cantrell the motto was officially revised and adopted by the staff. This change is detailed in this excerpt from Dr. Cantrell's thesis The History of Bethany Nazarene College : "Character...Culture...Christ. These three words have ever been basic in the program and in the administration of Bethany-Peniel College. The noble founders of this college and their successors have consistently maintained that sound moral CHARACTER is the most insistent need in the world of men, that true CULTURE makes such moral character attractive and effective, and that the transforming power of CHRIST and the refining operation of the Spirit are indispensable in the building of the truest manhood and womanhood. This standard has ever required that the students in this college be provided with the best in educational procedure and the finest in spiritual atmosphere."

=== Alma mater ===
The lyrics for SNU's alma mater were written by a committee in 1940. This committee was composed of Alice Crill, Hoyle Thomas, Marjorie Crooks, Kyle Crist, Dave McKibbon, and Madge Posey. The lyrics were revised by J. Michael Crabtree, Class of 1972, in 1986 to reflect the university's name change from Bethany Nazarene College to Southern Nazarene University. The tune used to accompany the lyrics is Annie Lisle, an 1857 ballad composed by H.S. Thompson.

== Athletics ==
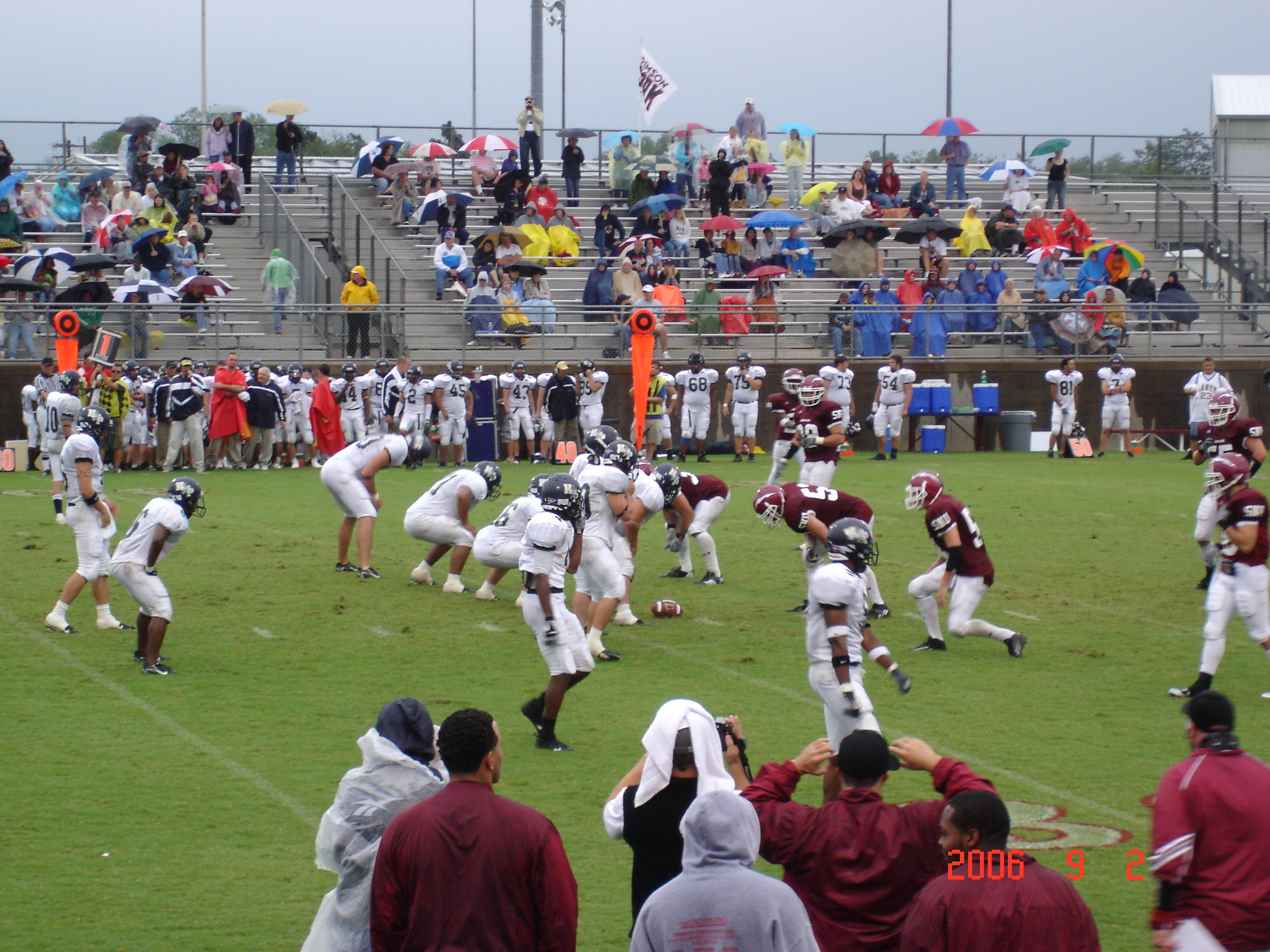
SNU football stadium

The Southern Nazarene (SNU) teams are called the Crimson Storm. The university is a member of NCAA Division II, primarily competing in the Great American Conference (GAC) since the 2012–13 academic year. The Crimson Storm previously competed in the Sooner Athletic Conference (SAC) of the National Association of Intercollegiate Athletics (NAIA) from 1978–79 to 2011–12; and in the Texoma Athletic Conference from 1972–73 to 1977–78. The athletics program at SNU began in 1964, when it was Bethany Nazarene College, with the creation of a men's basketball team.

SNU compete in 22 intercollegiate varsity sports. Men's sports include baseball, basketball, bowling, cheerleading, cross country, equestrian, football, golf, rugby, soccer, and track and field. Women's sports include basketball, bowling, cheerleading, cross country, equestrian, golf, rugby, soccer, softball, track and field, and volleyball.

=== Equestrian ===
Southern Nazarene University also has an equestrian center where students can learn the basics of horsemanship or move into more specialized fields of study. The SNU Equestrian Center is "committed to furthering the education of men and women looking for a career in the Equine Industry", which they do by offering classes like Equine Anatomy, Introduction to Equine Studies, and Introduction to Equine Reproduction. Additionally, the SNU Equestrian Center offers students the opportunity to try out for the Equestrian Team. Both English and Western riders can try out, and those who make the team participate in events sponsored by the Intercollegiate Horse Show Association

=== Facilities ===
There are five facilities and sites for athletic competition and training, including the Sawyer Center (1998) for basketball, volleyball, indoor track, commencement, and other ceremonies, McFarland Park Stadium (2001) for football, the Claud & Betty Cypert Athletic Complex (2000) for baseball and softball, the Wanda Rhodes Soccer Complex (1978), and the tennis courts (1985).

=== Nickname ===
The nickname has been the "Crimson Storm" since 2003, the colors are crimson and white, and the athletic nickname is the Crimson Storm. Until 1999, the nickname was the Redskins, but SNU officials adopted the Crimson Storm as a response to concerns that the term "Redskins" as an athletic mascot was derogatory to Native Americans.

== Notable alumni ==
Several SNU alumni have become notable as academics, politicians, and leaders in the Church of the Nazarene.

- Robert Hale, Class of 1955, American bass-baritone opera singer
- Gary Hart, Class of 1958, former United States senator from Colorado (1975-1987), and former U.S. presidential candidate
- Talmadge Johnson, Class of 1958, general superintendent emeritus, and former Nazarene general superintendents
- J. K. Warrick, Class of 1968, general superintendent emeritus, and former Nazarene general superintendents
- Boyd Matson, Class of 1969, an adventurer, and journalist
- Lupe Valdez, Class of 1970, sheriff of Dallas County, Texas, and the 2018 Democratic nominee for Governor of Texas
- Jerry D. Porter, Class of 1971, general superintendent emeritus, and former Nazarene general superintendents
- Vince Snowbarger, Class of 1971, former member of the U.S. House of Representatives from Kansas (1997-1999), and deputy director of the Pension Benefit Guaranty Corporation
- Linda N. Hanson, Class of 1972, was the 19th president of Hamline University (2005-2015)
- Kenny Marchant, Class of 1973, is currently a member of the U.S. House of Representatives from Texas
- Howard Hendrick, Class of 1977, is a former Oklahoma Senator (1987-1998), and Oklahoma Secretary of Human Services (2003-2011)
- Angelo Cruz, Class of 1985, was a professional basketball player who played for the Puerto Rican national basketball team
- David Busic, Class of 1988, the 40th general superintendent of the Church of the Nazarene
