= Fitkin =

Fitkin is a surname. Notable people with the surname include:

- Abram Fitkin (1878–1933), American minister and businessman
- Graham Fitkin (born 1963), British composer
- Mary Louise Fitkin (1907–1987), American activist
- Susan Norris Fitkin (1870–1951), Canadian ordained minister
