= Insull =

Insull may refer to:

- Insull Utilities Investment Inc.
- Insull, Kentucky
- Leonard Insull (1883–1974), figurinist
- Samuel Insull (1859–1938), investor
