= Archie Andrews (disambiguation) =

Archie Andrews is an American comics character created in 1941.

Archie Andrews may also refer to:

- Archie Andrews (puppet), a British ventriloquist's dummy operated by Peter Brough
- Archie Andrews (1879–1938), American automobile executive responsible for the Ruxton
