= William Howard Hoople =

American religious figure (1868–1922)

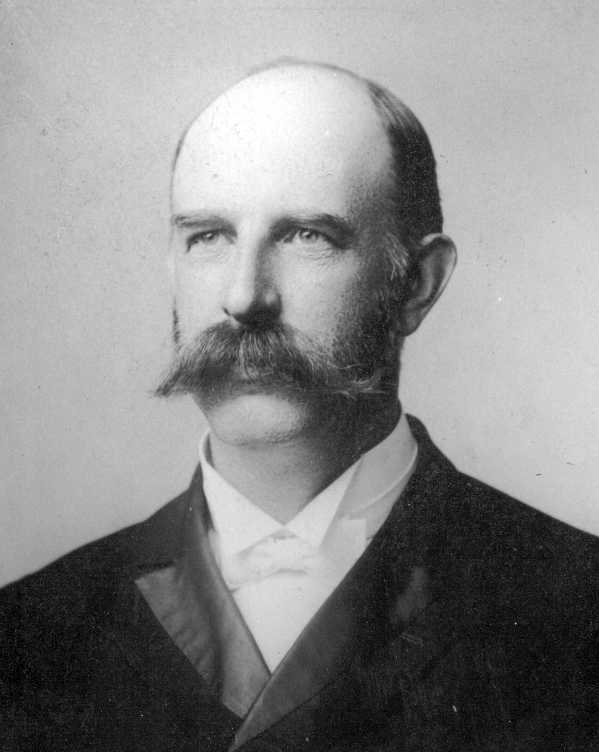
William Howard Hoople

William Howard Hoople (August 6, 1868 – September 29, 1922) was an American businessman and religious figure. He was a prominent leader of the American Holiness movement; the co-founder of the Association of Pentecostal Churches of America, one of the antecedent groups that merged to create the Church of the Nazarene; rescue mission organizer; an ordained minister in the Church of the Nazarene, and first superintendent of the New York District of the Church of the Nazarene; YMCA worker; baritone gospel singer; successful businessman and investor; and inventor.

== Early years ==
=== Family background ===
Hoople was born in Herkimer, New York, on August 6, 1868, the oldest child and only son of Canadian immigrants William Gordon Hoople (born April 3, 1841, in Dickinson's Landing, Eastern District, Upper Canada; died December 28, 1908, of "acute indigestion" in New York), an Episcopalian clerk employed by his uncle, and Agnes T. Blackburn (born March 1844 in Osnabruck Township, Eastern District, Upper Canada; died 1915), an Episcopalian school teacher. William and Agnes, were childhood sweethearts who grew up in Osnabruck in Stormont County, Ontario, near the Long Sault just across the Saint Lawrence River from Upstate New York, an area had been settled originally by the 1st Battalion of Sir John Johnson's King's Royal Regiment of New York (also known informally as the Royal New Yorkers and the Royal Greens) after the conclusion of the American Revolutionary War in 1783. WG Hoople had been born on a farm on the banks of Hoople's Creek granted about 1797 to his grandfather Henry Hoople (born 1760 in Cherry Valley, New York; died 1838 in Stormont, Ontario, Canada) on the Second Concession by the British government as reward for fighting for the Loyalist cause."Willie" Gordon Hoople was born after the death of his grandfather, however the farm was supervised by his grandmother, Henry's widow, Mary Whitmore "Granny" Hoople (born in New Jersey in 1767; died 1858), who, after the massacre of her parents and two siblings on Easter Day, March 26, 1780, had been abducted from the family farm at Mud Creek (now Jerseytown, Pennsylvania) by the Delaware Indians and lived among them for seven years. After their marriage in 1788, Mary and Henry had twelve children: nine sons and three daughters, with Willie's father, Joseph Hoople (born 1809 in Newington, Ontario; died 1892 in Newington). being the eleventh child and youngest son.

In April 1862 William G. Hoople migrated to New York City, in the same month as the second marriage of his father. After three years of advanced education in a New York academy financed by his uncle, in 1865 W.G. entered the firm of his uncle, William Henry Hoople (born 1805 in Ontario, Canada; died June 17, 1895, in Hastings-on-Hudson, New York, age 89), a widower who was also a prosperous businessman, whose son, William H. Hoople, Jr., had refused to enter the family business. WH Hoople had founded Van Nostrand & Hoople in 1832 with John Van Nostrand at 38 Ferry Street, near the corner with Cliff Street, in an area of lower Manhattan known as "The Swamp", the fetid southeastern blocks of the city centred on Jacob and Ferry Streets just east of City Hall, that had been "the (stinking) locus of the tanning and leather currying industry" since the late 1690s. This firm sold tanning materials and dyes.

After two years working for his uncle in a clerical position, W.G. Hoople returned to Canada to marry Agnes at the Long Sault (now South Stormont), Ontario on June 26, 1867. Soon after William Howard Hoople's birth in August 1868, the family moved from Herkimer to New York city. W.G. Hoople acquired US citizenship on July 27, 1869, at which time the family resided at 117 2nd Avenue (at the corner with Seventh Street) in what was then in the Little Germany section of the Lower East Side of New York City. By 1870 the family had relocated to Jamaica, Queens, where WG Hoople lived with his wife; his widowed mother-in-law, Sarah Blackburn; and his son, William Howard Hoople; and a servant. Subsequently their family was enlarged through the births of his three daughters:

- Mary Edith Hoople Staebler (born 19 April 1870 in Jamaica, Long Island, New York; died 1955);
- Clara L. Hoople (born 1873 in New York; died 1873); and
- Bessie Maude Hoople Nichols (born June 1880 in New York; died 1966).

After the retirement of his uncle in 1870, and after five years "learning the ropes", W.G. Hoople became a partner and managed Van Nostrand & Hoople, until his uncle's death on 17 June 1895. As a reward for his stewardship, W.G. Hoople received a sizable inheritance of $55,000 in real estate from his uncle. The success of his various business enterprises resulted in William G. Hoople becoming a multi-millionaire. In 1870 Hoople, in partnership with Edward Everett Androvette, established Hoople & Androvette, dealers in tanning materials and dyes, at 250 Front Street, New York city, a five-story building that they purchased in September 1902. Also in 1870 W.G. Hoople and Loring Andrew Robertson (born November 12, 1828, in Windham, New York; died October 9, 1890, in New York) formed Robertson & Hoople, which traded as a leather merchant. On January 3, 1884, W.G. Hoople and Robertson incorporated the New York Leather Belting Company which manufactured oak-tanned leather belting, waterproof leather halting, and electric belts at its factory at the corner of South Eleventh Street and Kent Avenue, Brooklyn. Additionally, W.G. Hoople had established Hoople & Nichols, in partnership with William S. Nichols (born February 1845 in Rhode Island; died September 25, 1892), whose son, Albert I. Nichols, later became his partner in the firm, and also married his youngest daughter, Bessie. This firm imported shellac, but later expanded to become a hardware store, selling brushes. WG Hoople was also involved in real estate investments. In September 1893 WG Hoople purchased four multi-story buildings at Peck Slip and Pearl Street, Manhattan that were under foreclosure, while in August 1897 he sold a four-story brownstone-front building near the infamous Five Points at 32 Great Jones Street for $27,000, and in 1899 he sold the building that housed his offices at 38 Ferry Street, New York, to philanthropist businessman Charles Adolph Schieren (born February 28, 1842, in Germany; died March 15, 1915), the penultimate mayor of Brooklyn (1894–1895). WG Hoople was also a director of the Hide and Leather Bank that had been established on June 15, 1891, and was headquartered in a ten-story building at 88–90 Gold Street. By 1909 WG Hoople was also a member of the New York Drug Trade Club.

=== Education and business ===
By 1879 the WG Hoople family had moved to 352 Greene Avenue, Brooklyn, New York. William Howard Hoople was one of the first twelve students at the Pratt Institute, a co-educational trade school at Clinton Hill, Brooklyn, established on October 17, 1887, and endowed by Charles Pratt (1830–1891), the wealthy co-founder of Standard Oil, "for training skilled artisans, foremen, designers and draftsmen". After graduation from Pratt Institute, Hoople attended another business college in Brooklyn. About 1888 Hoople was still living at 1475 Pacific Street, Brooklyn with his parents. Soon after Hoople opened his own leather business, which manufactured Goodyear Welting at a factory he built on a property owned by his great uncle, William H. Hoople, at 50 Ferry Street, New York City. Upon the death of his great uncle in 1895, he inherited this property, then valued at $10,000.

=== Family ===
On May 2, 1891 Hoople married Victoria Irene Cranford (born May 24, 1867, in Brooklyn, New York; died April 1952) in the home of Victoria's parents.

By 1896 the Hooples were living at 102 Decatur Street, Brooklyn. The Hooples had one daughter and five sons:

- Ruth Agnes Hoople (born January 14, 1892, in New York; died July 1972 in Syracuse, New York), who graduated from Syracuse University in 1914, and completed a Master of Arts in History in 1915. She was a member of Alpha Chi Omega. She worked for the next two years in social service in Buffalo, New York, for the YWCA; was as a missionary with the YWCA in China (1917–1928), serving in Peking (1917–1918), at the Girls' Normal School in Mukden, Manchuria (1918–1920, 1924), and Tientsin (from 1920, where she was general secretary of the YWCA in Tientsin); began a PhD program at Columbia University in 1922; and later served as a chaplain at the Syracuse University, and as the executive secretary of the Syracuse-in-China programme (1941–1952);
- William Clifford Hoople (born October 20, 1893, in New York; died September 2, 1943, in New York "of a heart ailment"), married Marguerite (Marjorie) Landenberger (born October 24, 1893, in Pennsylvania; died December 1978 in New Hampshire) in 1915, graduated from Syracuse University in 1920, coached rowing at Harvard University, and became an artist who provided illustrations for the American Legion Weekly; Saturday Evening Post, Country Gentleman, Farm Life, and McCall's, and to accompany the writing of Agatha Christie; WC Hoople was considered one of the contemporary artistic rivals of Norman Rockwell;

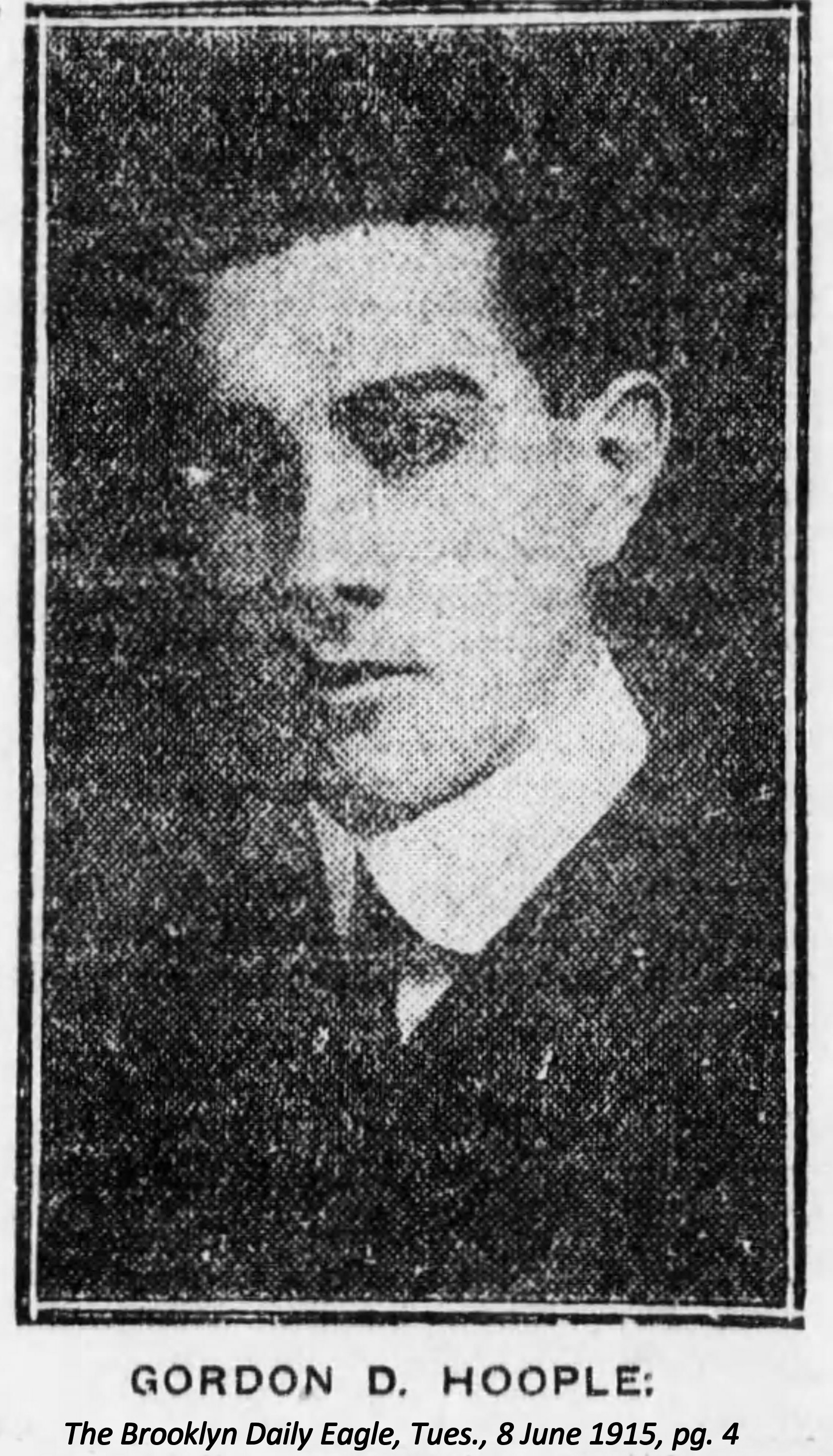
Gordon Douglass Hoople

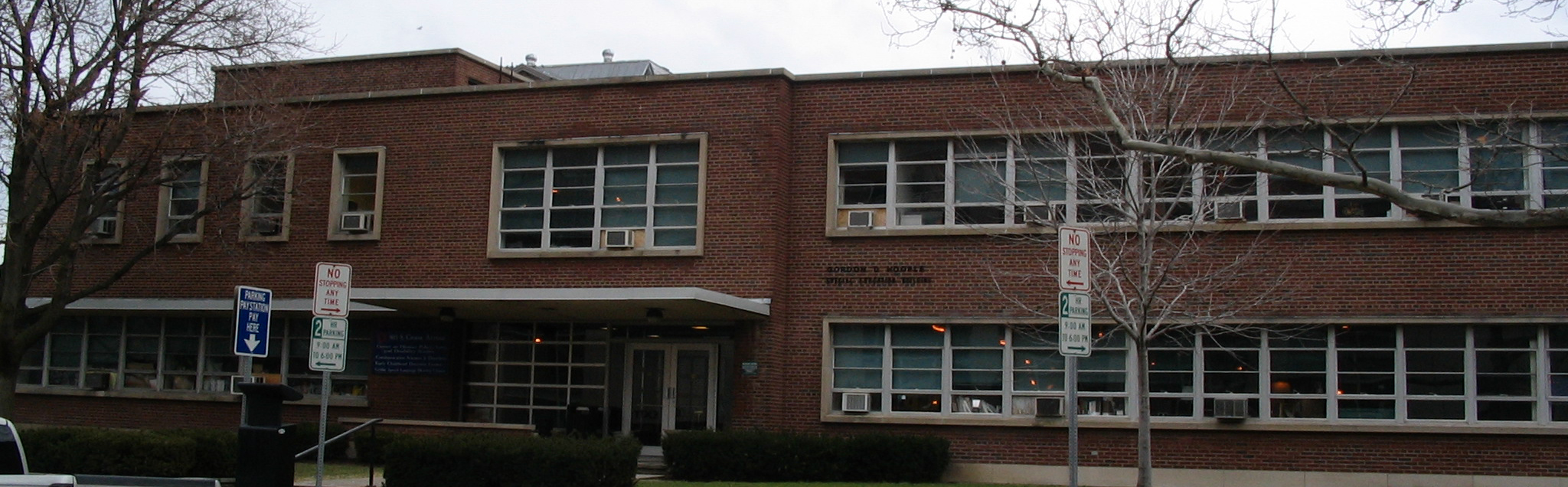
The Gordon D. Hoople Special Education and Rehabilitation Building

- Gordon Douglass "Gymp" Hoople (born 19 February 1895 in Brooklyn, New York; died 4 June 1973 in Syracuse, New York), who after completing his Bachelor of Science (1919) and M.D. (1922) at Syracuse University and his internship in Brooklyn, spent four months as a missionary in Chengdu, Sichuan, west China, from December 1921, married Dorothea L. Brokaw on August 2, 1922, before departing on August 24, 1922, to serve as a missionary doctor under the West China Mission of the Methodist Episcopal Church as part of the Syracuse-in-China programme in Chongqing, Sichuan, Professor of Otolaryngology at Syracuse University (1928–1953), who served on the board of trustees of the university since 1931, and chairman by 1962, and was awarded The George Arents Pioneer Medal in 1951 and an honorary Doctor of Laws degree by his alma mater in 1967. During World War II, Gordon D. Hoople served as a major in the US Army Medical Corps. The Gordon D. Hoople Special Education and Rehabilitation Building of Syracuse University, which was completed in February 1953, is at the corner of South Crouse Avenue and Marshall Street, contains the Gordon D. Hoople Hearing and Speech Center.
- Howard Cranford "Tot" Hoople (born October 12, 1897, in New York; died August 27, 1977, in Damariscotta, Maine), a graduate of Syracuse University in 1921, married Nelda Rautenberg (born June 14, 1898; died August 1985 in Maine) in the summer of 1921 in New York, who by 1930 was a life insurance salesman; and who from 1945 to its temporary closure in 1965, owned Camp Med-O-Lark on Washington Pond, Washington, Maine;

By June 1900 Hoople and Victoria were living back at 1475 Pacific Street, Brooklyn with three servants, and Henrietta (Hettie), Victoria's 49-year-old spinster sister.

- Ross Earle Hoople (born June 30, 1900, in New York; died June 17, 1946), graduated from the philosophy department of Syracuse University in June 1922, attended Harvard in 1922–1923, married Ruth T. Pearsall (died November 21, 1958, in Syracuse, New York) at the Presbyterian Church in Mount Vernon, New York, in June 1926, and was by 1932 professor of philosophy at Syracuse University, and chairman of the Faculty Forum on Religion, and later the author of Preface to Philosophy: Book of Readings (1946); and
- Robert Blackburn Hoople (born February 25, 1905, in New York; died March 31, 1992, in Binghamton, New York), who graduated from Syracuse University in 1926, later earned a Master of Arts degree.

=== Personal ===
According to Basil Miller, "Hoople was a mighty man in frame as well as spirit, for he stood six feet and six inches (when he took off his leather shoes) and pushed the scale beam up at 250 pounds". In another account Hoople is described as "a large man with a commanding presence and great earnestness of manner."

== Spiritual background ==
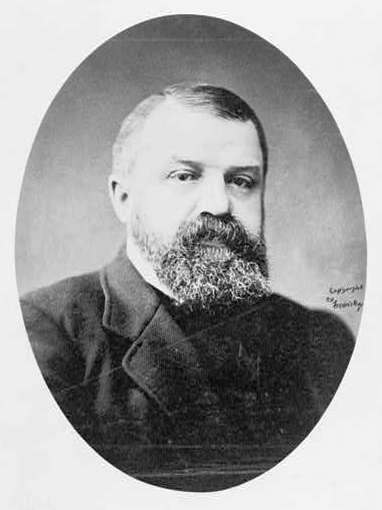
Dwight L. Moody

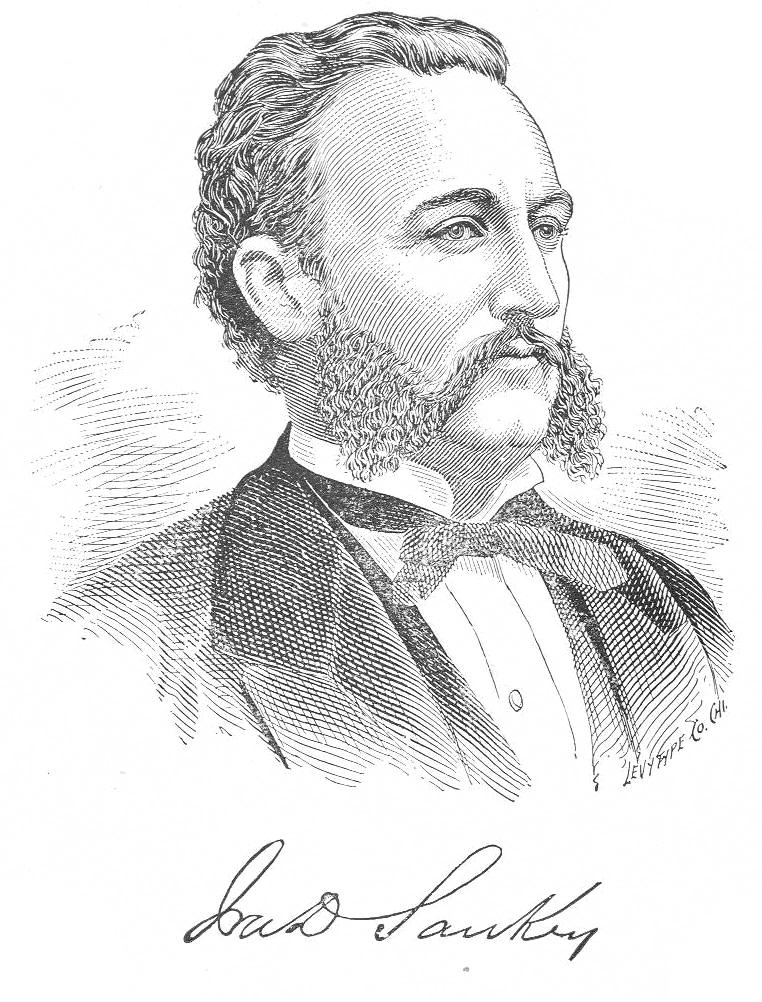
Ira Sankey

As a child Hoople and his family attended the Sunday School of the Central Congregational church located at Hancock Street, near Franklin Avenue in Brooklyn, and later became a member of that church. In December 1885 Hoople attended an evangelistic service for young men in the newly opened building of the Central Branch of the YMCA at 502 Fulton Street, Brooklyn held by Dwight Moody and Ira Sankey, and at the conclusion of the service, while the choir sang Just as I Am, responded to the gospel invitation and "walked into the arms of Jesus". In an interview for the Brooklyn Eagle in February 1895, Hooper indicated: "I was converted nine years ago at the Central branch of the Young Men’s Christian Association in Brooklyn". Hoople believed he was saved from "a life of frivolity and ambition."

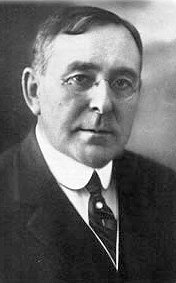
J. Wilbur Chapman

Hoople was a baritone who "was blessed with a beautiful voice", Hoople was described in 1933 as "a great singer, having a fine, deep, powerful voice. If he couldn't accomplish his purpose in any other way, he sang his way through." Hoople often sang solos and led the singing in churches of various denominations, at the Methodist Home for the Aged in Brooklyn, and at services sponsored by the YMCA and the Christian Endeavor Society. Additionally, by 1891 Hoople spoke regularly in YMCA meetings, and preached in the Bethesda Congregational Church while the pastor was on vacation. Hoople was a member of the "famous Hadley Male Quartet", which further spread Hoople's fame and influence in the city. One report indicated: "If there were no other way through, the quartet helped Hoople sing his way through. When this quartet sang to an audience of six thousand at a meeting of J. Wilbur Chapman's revival in New York city there were few dry eyes."

On June 18, 1891, Hoople was elected the first treasurer of the nonsectarian Industrial Christian Alliance, which would give "practical help to the outcast poor", in a similar manner to the methods of the Salvation Army. By July 14, 1891, the ICA was incorporated. On November 30, 1891, the Alliance opened a 39-bed home at 113 MacDougal Street (today the site of the Minetta Tavern), near Hoople's business, where the poor could stay for up to sixty days, "be cleaned, clothed, treated medically and mentally", and given the opportunity to work in one of the sponsoring businesses. Plans were to establish a depot for women, rescue missions, and to establish kindergartens, day nurseries, and industrial schools. One of the activities of the ICA was to establish a broom factory where the residents could work in exchange for their room and board, and the brooms and whisks were sold to generate income for the ICA. As a result of the Panic of 1893, unemployment and poverty increased dramatically in this area, necessitating the relocation of the ICA home to a 100-bed facility at 170 Bleecker Street by May 1, 1893. During the Winter of 1893, the ICA opened the People's Restaurant at its headquarters at 170 Bleecker Street and at six other locations. The ICA provided a million meals to the impoverished unemployed for only 5 cents for a hot meal for a family of four people, but by the end of 1894 the ICA was pleading to the general public for the first time for additional financial resources, and Hoople was no longer treasurer.

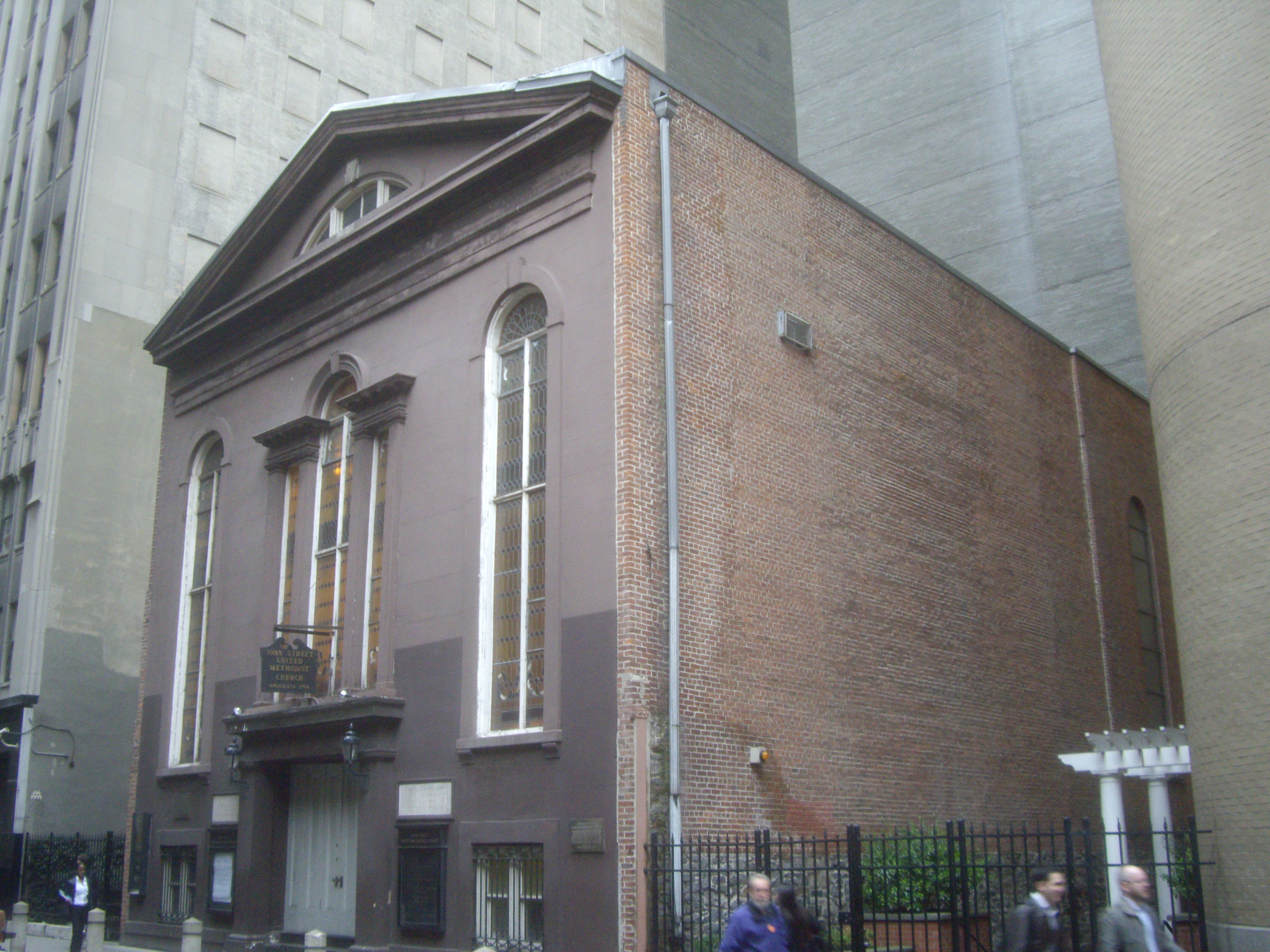
John Street Methodist Church

According to Hoople, "For several years after I was a member of a praying band". In the early 1890s Hoople began attending the noonday prayer meeting at the John Street Methodist Church at 44 John Street, Manhattan. There he met Charles H. BeVier (born September 5, 1858; died about 1905), "a zealous witness to holiness and choir leader at the largest Methodist church in Brooklyn." According to Nazarene historian Timothy L. Smith, "Hoople thought BeVier's "fanaticism" a pity, and set out to argue his new friend into rejecting sanctification. Instead, Hoople wound up finding the blessing himself" in his own shop in 1893. Hoople began attending some holiness meetings held in private homes in Brooklyn, "where they could worship God in the freedom of the Spirit." In July 1893 Hoople underwrote the expenses for the first ever camp meeting to be held in the small hamlet of Nanuet, New York, near his country home. At that time Hoople was a still a member of Central Congregational Church, which was pastored by Dr. Adolphus J.F. Behrends (born 1839 in the Netherlands; died c.1899 in New York). However, by October 1893 Hoople had left the Congregational church and was attending the Methodist church at Windsor Terrace, Flatbush. In 1895 Hoople indicated that because he became an adherent of "Methodist doctrine", he was "unwelcome in the Calvinistic church that nurtured his early faith in Christ".

== Ministry ==
Soon after his entire sanctification, Hoople continued to operate as a leather merchant in business hours, but each evening he began preaching on the streets, in rented halls, and "wherever a tiny crack in some mission door appeared". Gradually Hoople believed that "God was leading him to provide a place where sanctified people could sing and shout to their hearts' content". Consequently, Hoople rented a former saloon (next to a brothel) at 123 Schenectady Avenue in Brooklyn. Hoople had it cleaned and furnished, and on New Year's Day, 1894, began holding services. On January 4, 1894, Hoople and BeVier, who led a Methodist mission in Brooklyn, opened an Independent Holiness Mission, with Hoople being elected superintendent by the members. From the beginning the basic motivation was to establish a holiness work and especially to preach to the poor.

=== Utica Avenue Pentecostal Tabernacle (1894–1904) ===
From this mission a congregation developed rapidly, necessitating relocation to a larger facility. Hoople; John Norberry (born July 29, 1867, in Paterson, New Jersey; died September 26, 1937, at Ocean Grove, New Jersey), a Methodist local preacher; and Richard T. Ryons (born 1834; died January 17, 1915, in Brooklyn), a Methodist who had been an actor in the troupe managed by Laura Keene, found a vacant lot on nearby Utica Avenue, between Dean and Bergen Streets, which, after the three knelt down and prayed, believed was the right location. Hoople purchased the lot with money borrowed from his father. In April 1894 Hoople's father funded the estimated $2,000 cost to erect a simple one-story frame tabernacle-style church building that measured 49.5 feet in length and the same in width on the site. Just over three weeks after the building permit was granted, the new church was opened on May 16, 1894 with Hoople as pastor and 32 charter members. The Utica Avenue Pentecostal Tabernacle was dedicated on June 15, 1894 with the dedication sermon preached at 7.30 pm by Methodist Rev. Dr. M.D. Collins of Ocean Grove, New Jersey. Redford recorded:

Despite the lack of architectural beauty, a greater spirit of worship was there than was found in many magnificent church structures. The unusual spiritual enthusiasm drew such crowds that frequently numbers of persons were turned away from the services. The membership grew rapidly, and the lives of many persons were transformed.

Late in 1894 Hoople was ordained, with prominent holiness movement leader Baptist Rev. Edgar M. Levy (born November 23, 1822, in St. Marys, Georgia; died October 30, 1906, in Philadelphia, Pennsylvania), who co-founded the Douglas, Massachusetts Holiness Camp Meeting in 1875, preaching the ordination sermon. Just prior to Christmas 1894, the non-denominational New-York State Holiness Association was opened in this building, with BeVier elected president, and Hoople elected vice-president.

At 9.30 am on February 1, 1895, Hoople opened the Bedford Avenue Pentecostal Tabernacle at the corner of south Third Street and Bedford Avenue in east Brooklyn in a former Unitarian church which they leased for $1,000 per year. The congregation was organised as the Bedford Avenue Pentecostal Church on February 24, 1895, with 20 charter members. By January 1897 this congregation had grown to about 130 members. John Norberry was called to be its pastor. The church was congregational in polity with two elders (Hoople and Ryon), three deacons, and two deaconesses. It was independent of all denominations, and its doctrine was self-described as "Bible holiness and entire sanctification obtainable in this life". It prohibited raising funds through church fairs, entertainments or picnics. Hoople indicated: "I do not believe that money for the Lord should be raised through the medium of a man's stomach, or his mere love of amusements. The only offerings that will find favor in His sight is free will offerings." In 1895 Hoople described himself in the Christian Witness as a Congregationalist who had "embraced Methodist doctrine". This logic lay behind the churches Hoople shepherded in Brooklyn. He rejected American Methodism's episcopal system. Hoople received no salary for his ministry, and paid most of the expenses including rent, gas, and heat himself as the members of his congregation were often impoverished. One 1897 newspaper account indicated: "His work in the church is a labor of love. He receives no salary. The little church he built and paid for with his own money." At that time a church representative (possibly Hoople himself) explained:

We are an Independent, dependent body, and are not come-outers but as none of the evangelical bodies seemed to desire to push holiness as a second work of grace, and where they had tried this it took a good deal of coaxing and teaching and then after it was about accomplished some one came along and upset the whole thing, because they had control of the temporal power and were opposed to holiness; and as our time here is short and we didn't amount to much, we thought the most sensible thing for us to do was to walk alone with the Triune God. Perhaps this may sound strange to some of my Methodist brethren, but after all you can't expect very much from one who was a Congregationalist and embraced Methodist doctrine. Holiness is apt to make us appear to the world a little peculiar.

As early as February 1895 Hoople envisioned additional congregations: "It is my intention if our two churches become in any way self-supporting to start others in different parts of the town. There is plenty of room for them." The third church planted was the Emmanuel Pentecostal Tabernacle, which was organised in a deserted church building at the corner of Lewis Avenue and Kosciusko Street, Brooklyn on Labor Day (Monday, September 3), 1895 with Frederick William "Fred" Sloat (born January 12, 1875, in New York) ordained as the pastor "amidst the outpouring of the Spirit", with the church membership soon reaching 39.

=== Association of Pentecostal Churches of America (1895–1907) ===
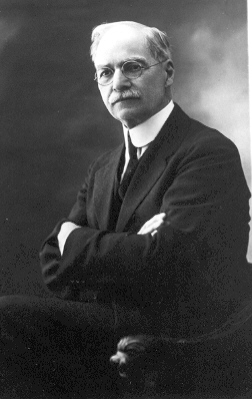
Hiram F Reynolds

On December 12, 1895, Hoople and BeVier, with the assistance of Hiram F. Reynolds, a Methodist minister who had joined Hoople's group in October 1895, organised the three churches into a new holiness denomination, the Association of Pentecostal Churches of America (APCA), which was incorporated in the state of New York about April 8, 1896, with Hoople, Norberry and Sloat as three of the six trustees. While all of the APCA churches were at that time in Brooklyn, the choice of name indicated clearly that the founders had a vision for it to become a national denomination.

The APCA proposed union with the Central Evangelical Holiness Association (founded in 1890), and ultimately most of the fifteen congregations of that group became members of the APCA. After initial discussions held in Hoople's parlor from November 11, 1896, that resulted in a plan of union being developed, the union was finalized on April 13, 1897, at Lynn, Massachusetts. at which time the APCA decided to send its first missionaries to India. A standing missionary committee of twelve members was created to oversee all foreign missionary work, with Hoople elected chairman. This committee was the only central planning body of the denomination. While its focus was on its embryonic work overseas, which was to support missionary work from 1898 in India and from 1900 in Cape Verde, its executive committee also increasingly supervised domestic activities.

In May 1897 Hoople was accused by two excommunicated church members of using hypnotism to frequently put some members of his congregation into trances that lasted up to three hours in special meetings held after the usual services, where one woman was allegedly driven insane, and one man even died of a heart attack. One church member indicated that during her sanctification, "I knew nothing of what was going on around me, but I was permitted to see God and he gave me hymns to sing and unhappiness fell from me." Paulin Vauclair, a deaconess in the Utica Avenue church, and one of the women who passed out during the services, denied the accusations against Hoople, indicating "It is the spirit of God which inspires us to act as we do, and Pastor Hoople has no more to do with it than you do." Vauclair indicated that a number of men and women fainted, and that these also occurred when Hoople was absent. Another deacon responded to the accusations: "Pastor Hoople possesses no power save that which comes from the Holy Ghost." After the accounts featured in the Brooklyn Eagle and elsewhere, Hoople took a three weeks' trip and the services were more subdued. However, on May 27, 1897, Hoople was still scheduled to join a number of APCA ministers at the dedication of the new People's Pentecostal Tabernacle APCA church at the corner of Latham and Division streets, Sag Harbor, New York, on June 3–4, 1897. Hiram Reynolds recalled in 1933:

About this time we dedicated a church building, over at Sag Harbor, Long Island, New York. At the altar service, following the dedication, the power and glory of God, as in the Old Testament times, so filled the church and fell on the officiating ministers and upon the people that there was no more service in the sanctuary. Such grace remained upon the ministry that as they were trying to walk to their places of entertainment they laughed, cried and shouted. It took them a long time to reach the parsonage, for en route they would lean on picket fences, and against buildings, the glory was so great. After reaching the pastor's home they had to wait a long time on the steps, too overcome to climb the stairs ... In the days of the late '90s it was the common experience to see persons fall under 'the power' of God. It was not infrequent to have them, as they recovered from these visitations, shout, laugh and demonstrate in various ways. Invariably on these occasions the glory of God would fill the place and often many of the people ... In these early days, of which we write, the holiness people nearly everywhere practiced getting together, especially in cities, or where there were nearby holiness bodies of different denominational preferences, and having what they termed 'an all day holiness meeting.' ... We were once having such a meeting in Brooklyn, N. Y. when at the close of the forenoon service, before the speaker could call for seekers, the power and glory of God were poured out upon the entire place, Rev. Wm. Howard Hoople was among the first among the preachers to fall on the platform. Others were prostrated, and many of the lay people present fell and remained under the miraculous power of God even until the afternoon preaching service. The altar services during the afternoon and evening were crowned with seekers.

The APCA grew steadily from 1897 to 1907 as churches were added in New England, the Middle Atlantic states, the District of Columbia, Canada, and the Midwest. Hoople organized the John Wesley Pentecostal Church on November 11, 1897, in Manchester, CT. Reynolds organized churches in Oxford and Springhill, Nova Scotia, in 1902. A congregation in Pittsburgh led by John Norris united in 1899. By 1907 there were churches in Illinois and Iowa. In 1900 the Pentecostal Collegiate Institute (now Eastern Nazarene College) was founded at Saratoga Springs, New York, and relocated to North Scituate, Rhode Island, in the fall of 1903.

By 1900 Hoople was a featured speaker in the Brooklyn Forward Movement, a movement that united pastors of various denominations to conduct co-operative evangelistic and civic activities, and to promote temperance. Their approach was to use churches as the venue for their activities rather than halls and theatres, and to have meetings extended over a longer period rather than those of only a few days. Hoople also supported the Prohibition movement and both allowed his churches to be used as venues for temperance rallies and to speak at them.

On January 1, 1904, Hoople resigned as pastor of the Utica Avenue Pentecostal church exactly ten years after he began the work in Brooklyn. At the 1904 annual meeting of the APCA, the delegates elected Hoople as both field evangelist and superintendent of home missions with an annual salary of $1,200 per year. However, by the end of 1904 Hoople resigned his full-time salaried position in the APCA partly because the committee would not act on his recommendations regarding the debt-ridden Pentecostal Collegiate Institute. While remaining a minister within the APCA, Hooper then worked with Henry B. "Harry" Hosley (born November 1861 in New York; died 1925), then pastor of the Wesleyan Pentecostal APCA Church in Washington, D.C., with the Pentecostal League, a "transdenominational Wesleyan holiness movement" that had been founded in 1891 in Britain by Anglican barrister Richard Reader Harris (born July 5, 1847, in Worcester, England; died March 30, 1909, in London, England) to "spread Scriptural Holiness by unsectarian methods."

==== John Wesley Pentecostal Church (1905–1907) ====
In 1905, after the death of Charles BeVier, who had been the founding pastor of the John Wesley Pentecostal Church since its organization on December 17, 1896, in a rented storefront, Hoople began a thirteen-year pastorate at this church. By September 1907 the church had relocated to a site at the corner of Saratoga Avenue and Sumpter Street, Brooklyn, which they had purchased for $6,500. The new site was dedicated on Sunday April 14, 1907, and a building seating 800 was constructed and opened about September 1, 1907. The church was to be a memorial to BeVier.

==== Union discussions (April 1907) ====
PF Bresee

At a meeting held at the Utica Avenue church between the leaders of the APCA (including Hoople and John Norberry) and Phineas F. Bresee, C. W. Ruth (born September 1, 1865, in Hilltown, Pennsylvania; died May 27, 1941, in Wilmore, Kentucky) and other representatives of the California-based Church of the Nazarene, on Thursday, April 11, 1907, "amidst tears, and laughter, and shouts, and every possible manifestation of holy joy", a plan of union between the two denominations was agreed unanimously, with consummation to be at Chicago in October. In May 1903 Ruth had contact with the APCA at a camp meeting in which he was one of the preachers. As he was considerably impressed with the APCA, he wrote Bresee from Allentown, Pennsylvania, that "William Howard Hoople, H. F. Reynolds, and C. Howard Davis led a 'plain, fire-baptized, Holy Ghost people' who conducted "about the noisiest and 'shoutinest'" camp meeting he had ever attended." After hearing Bresee preach, Hoople said to his friends and associates, "If we cannot unite with a man like that, God have mercy on us." Despite the enthusiasm of the denominational leaders, union required considerable negotiation as, like many other pastors in the APCA, Hoople was a strong, independent-minded leader "who resented any compromise of congregational autonomy". Only a few weeks earlier, Hoople had written in the Beulah Christian: "With some of us our present form of government is a matter of principle." Hoople was willing to unite with the Church of the Nazarene if it would "consent to the Congregational form of government; [however] if it is to be the connectional Episcopal form there is one person in the Association who will be left out of the Union – the writer." After the plan of union was agreed upon, Hoople indicated that he had submerged secondary matters in order to facilitate "a combined attack on the powers of hell and darkness". Hoople admitted that he had had to "gulp a good deal down in order to make the union possible." At the consummation of the union with the Church of the Nazarene, the APCA had 45 congregations and 2,407 members, scattered from Iowa to Nova Scotia, while the Church of the Nazarene reported 48 congregations and 3,827 members at that time.

=== Pentecostal Church of the Nazarene (1907–1922) ===
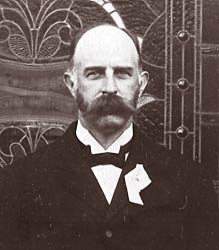
Hoople at General Assembly

At the General Assembly in Chicago in October 1907, Hoople started to re-consider his support of the union, and had thought of keeping the churches he had pioneered in Brooklyn out of the merger, but he finally acquiesced. After giving an account of the origin and development of the Association of Pentecostal Churches of America, Hoople informed the assembled delegates:

We thank God for the prosperity we have had; that repeatedly in one section and another we found openings. Today we have something like forty churches, and it is wonderful how the Lord has blessed us. Sometimes it seems that there were periods when things were against us, but we have stood the storm, and come out the stronger ... We have put more members in other churches than we have taken out. We are not sore or fighting. We are just pushing, that is all. We desire to have a heart as big as the world is round.

After the union was completed at 9.30 pm on October 16, 1907, Bresee was elected general superintendent by acclamation, with Hoople one of those who spoke approvingly in favour of Bresee's election. While Hoople polled well in the election of the second general superintendent, ultimately Reynolds was chosen to serve with Bresee.

==== District Superintendent New York District (1907–1911) ====
After the merger of the Association of Pentecostal Churches of America with the Church of the Nazarene to form the Pentecostal Church of the Nazarene in Chicago in October 1907, Hoople was appointed the first district superintendent of the New York district (which included both the state of New York but also Connecticut), a position he held reluctantly until 1911. At the Second General Assembly, which would be deemed later as the founding of the denomination, held at Pilot Point, Texas, in October 1908, Hoople was one of those who seconded the motion to effect the merger with the Holiness Church of Christ on October 13. According to C.B. Jernigan, "Brother W. H. Hoople addressed the Assembly on the prospective joy of the union of the two churches, and expressed satisfaction in seeing nothing but the spirit of Jesus in all the deliberations. "It is holiness that has done it, and Jesus is responsible for it." Nazarene historian Timothy L. Smith recorded: "After the unanimous vote for union had been announced, a wiry little Texan started across the platform saying, 'I haven't hugged a Yankee since before the Civil War, but I'm going to hug one now.' At once Brooklyn's William Howard Hoople, his 275 pounds adorned with a glorious handlebar mustache, leaped up from the other end of the platform and met the Texan near the pulpit. Their embrace set off a celebration. The gap between North and South was closed forever." As a result of the consummation of the union, three general superintendents would be chosen. On the first ballot both Bresee and Reynolds were re-elected, with Hoople and Edgar P. Ellyson tied in third. On the second ballot Ellyson was elected.

==== John Wesley Pentecostal Church of the Nazarene (1907–1917) ====
While still superintendent of the New York district, Hoople remained the pastor of the John Wesley Pentecostal Church of the Nazarene. At this time Hoople resided at 1417 Dean Street, Brooklyn with his wife Victoria; their six children; Victoria's 53-year-old spinster sister, Emma Louise Cranford; and two servants. In 1911 the church was holding worship services on Tuesday, Wednesday, and Friday evenings at 8.00 pm, as well as a Holiness meeting and Class meetings at 8.00 pm on Thursday evenings, in addition to a service at 11.00 am and again at 8.00 pm on Sundays. Sunday School was held at 2.30 pm on Sundays, and a Young People's service held at 7.00 pm. On Wednesday evenings at 8.00 pm Hoople conducted a Bible Study and Theology class in his study. Finally, on Fridays at 4.00 pm there were separate Children's and Youth classes. Joseph Caldwell Bearse (born 4 October 1869 in South Chatham, Massachusetts; died 2 July 1931 in South Portland, Maine) served as Hoople's associate pastor at this time. While Hoople was not known as a great preacher, he was known as a great pastor. His enthusiasm never failed to rally the people, and he lifted his melodious voice in song whenever the worship service lagged, raising the spirits of his congregation." In May 1913 Hoople was subpoenaed to appear in court after Rebecca Yankolowitz (born in Russia in 1897), who had converted to Christianity and joined the John Wesley Church, ran away from her home and could not be located by her parents, Morris, a kosher butcher, and Bertha. During his thirteen years of leadership this congregation grew from 163 members reported in October 1908 to 350 members.

Hoople was one of the featured preachers at the Third General Assembly of the Pentecostal Church of the Nazarene held in the auditorium of the Pentecostal Mission at Fourth Avenue, Nashville, Tennessee, and also in the Ryman Auditorium in October 1911. At this General Assembly, a General Foreign Missionary Board was created, with Hoople elected president. In 1912 Hoople was asked to chair a committee to investigate whether his friend H.B. Hosley, a pastor of "incurable independence", who had been pastor of the Washington, D.C., Pentecostal Church of the Nazarene since Sunday, 28 December 1902, (thus replacing founding pastor Charles Howard Davis), and the founding district Superintendent of the Washington District of the Pentecostal Church of the Nazarene since October 1907, should be disciplined. In 1910 Hosley had transferred the ownership of the church's property in Washington, D.C., to an interdenominational holiness trust. Hoople, "a champion of local church autonomy", exonerated Hosley, who after June 1913 subsequently resigned and withdrew with the majority of his congregation from the denomination into a new group that was "Wesleyan in doctrine" but "independent and congregational" in government. Hoople was one of the dominant voices at the Fourth General Assembly of the Pentecostal Church of the Nazarene held at the Kansas City First Church at the corner of 24th Street and Troost Avenue in Kansas City, Missouri, from 30 September 1915.

As a result of the disorganisation of the University Pentecostal Church of the Nazarene in Pasadena, California, and the removal of its pastor, Seth Cook Rees (born at Westfield, Indiana, on 6 August 1854; died 22 May 1933 at Pasadena, California), by fiat of the district superintendent on 25 February 1917, Hoople (who always had reservations about the need and power of the superintendents in the Church of the Nazarene) wrote to General Superintendent Hiram F. Reynolds in early 1917 that "the only basis under which he would continue to stay in the church was that he be released from all he had formerly agreed to 'in the line of Superintendency.' He would thereafter 'privately and publicly advocate away with all Superintendents." A few months later Hoople took a leave of absence from the John Wesley Church to participate actively in World War I. During Hoople's absence John Norberry served as pastor of the John Wesley Church.

=== YMCA (1917–1920) ===
After the entry of the US into World War I on 6 April 1917, Hoople volunteered to minister to the troops of the American Expeditionary Force with the YMCA. He was appointed a secretary of the National War Council of the Y.M.C.A. of the USA. On 18 May 1918 Hoople sailed for France. While in France, Hoople worked incessantly at the front lines as an entertainer, where he not only raised the spirits of the troops with "his melodious singing", but also led many soldiers to Christ. Hoople preached "in barns, buildings that had been shot to pieces, from the tail end of wagons, and auto trucks. His great voice led them many times in singing the old hymns that reminded them of home and sacred things. He won the hearts of thousands of those laddies, until he was commonly known among the regiment as 'Pop'." While on the front lines, Hoople was exposed to poisonous gas, and his health was subsequently damaged for the rest of his life. He was subsequently stationed in Italy and Germany, before returning to Brooklyn and his ministry at the John Wesley Pentecostal Church of the Nazarene. However, by 1919 Hoople was the pastor of the Utica Avenue Pentecostal Tabernacle that he had founded in 1894, and Rev. A.E. Reid was listed as the pastor at John Wesley church.

After 15 September 1919 Hoople left New York again to serve with the International Committee of the YMCA in Vladivostok, Siberia; China; and Japan. Hoople again ministered to the American Expeditionary Forces stationed in Siberia, and assisted in relief work among the civilian population. On his way to Siberia, Hoople visited Mukden to see his daughter, Ruth, who had been serving as a YWCA missionary to China since September 1917. After serving in Siberia, Hoople was able to visit Ruth who was now serving in Peking, China, where he was able to preach frequently. On 7 March 1920 Hoople arrived in Seattle, Washington, on the Japanese ship Suwa Maru, having left Yokohama, Japan, on 19 February 1920.

=== Church of the Nazarene (1919–1922) ===
==== John Wesley Church of the Nazarene (1919–1922) ====
After his return to Brooklyn in 1920, Hoople resumed preaching at the now renamed John Wesley Church of the Nazarene. At this time Hoople and his wife Victoria, were living at 277 Brooklyn Avenue, Brooklyn, a three-story brownstone building in the Crown Heights area built in 1905, with five of his children; his two spinster sisters-in-law, Henrietta and Louise; and a boarder. Rev. Susan Norris Fitkin (born in Quebec, Canada, on March 31, 1869; died October 18, 1951, in Alameda, California), the first general president of the Woman's Missionary Society for the Church of the Nazarene (now Nazarene Missions International) (1915–1948), her husband, Rev. Abram Edward Fitkin (born September 18, 1878, in Brooklyn, New York; died March 18, 1933, in New York city), and three of their children, were living nearby at 271 Brooklyn Avenue at this time.

== Business interests ==
On 29 May 1889 Hoople applied for a US Patent for "a new and Improved Leather-Stripping Machine" that he had invented. Patent 412,503 was granted on 8 October 1889. On 17 January 1899 Edgar J. Force (born March 1847 in Canada) assigned to Hoople one-fourth of the patent for his invention of "new and useful Improvements in Curtain or Portière Pole Rings and Fastenings". By 1902 Hoople was a director of Raimes & Company (established 1892). By 1909 he was also the president (having replaced his father who had been vice-president when he died in 1908), a New York-based company that manufactured druggist's supplies, such as "soft gelatine capsules, potassium ioxide, and galenicals".

In April 1908 Hoople was a part of a consortium that founded the Circle Publishing Company with its headquarters in the Society for the Prevention of Cruelty to Animals building at 15 West 26th Street and 50 Madison Avenue in New York city, and purchased The Circle magazine (founded 1906) from the Funk & Wagnalls Company, with Hoople becoming the founding vice president and treasurer, and Eugene Thwing (born in Quincy, Massachusetts, on January 17, 1866; died in Ridgewood, New Jersey, on May 29, 1936), editor of The Circle since its inception, becoming president. However, by 1910 the magazine failed, and was eventually sold in 1911 to the Thwing Company founded by Eugene Thwing. By 1909 Hoople was a director of the New York branch of the Cerebos Salt Company (founded in 1894), which had its registered office at 50 Ferry Street, New York, and appeared on the US market about 1904. By 1916 Hoople was the president of the Interstate Electric Corporation. By 1911 Hoople was listed as a director of the Spider Manufacturing Company, which made components for bicycles and automobiles, and was headquartered in his property at 50 Ferry Street, New York City. In 1916 Hoople was the founding president and one of the leading businessmen in a consortium that helped capitalize the American Motors Corp. founded by Louis Chevrolet in Plainfield, New Jersey. Hoople was president of American Motors until his death in 1922. On January 25, 1917, the Hoople Corporation, which sold "metal polish, drugs, medicines, chemicals, baking powder, soaps, [and] groceries" was incorporated in New York state with $30,000 capital.

After the entry of the United States into World War I in April 1917, Raimes & Company, the American agents of Franz Schulz, Jr. Co., a German company incorporated in New Jersey (in which Hoople then held 2% of the shares) that manufactured metal polish, attempted to seize the Schulz factory in order to preserve it and to allow its business to continue during the war. The owners of Franz Schulz., Jr. Co. subsequently sued Raimes & Company, for breach of contract and outstanding debts due to the Trading with the Enemy Act and the Alien Enemy Act. On May 2, 1917, just prior to his embarkation for France, Hoople transferred his property at 250 Front Street in Manhattan, that had previously belonged to his father, to his two surviving sisters, Bessie M. H. Nichols and Mary E. H. Staebler. In 1921 Hoople was the president of the Commonwealth Light & Power Co., with Abram Fitkin one of the directors.

== Death ==
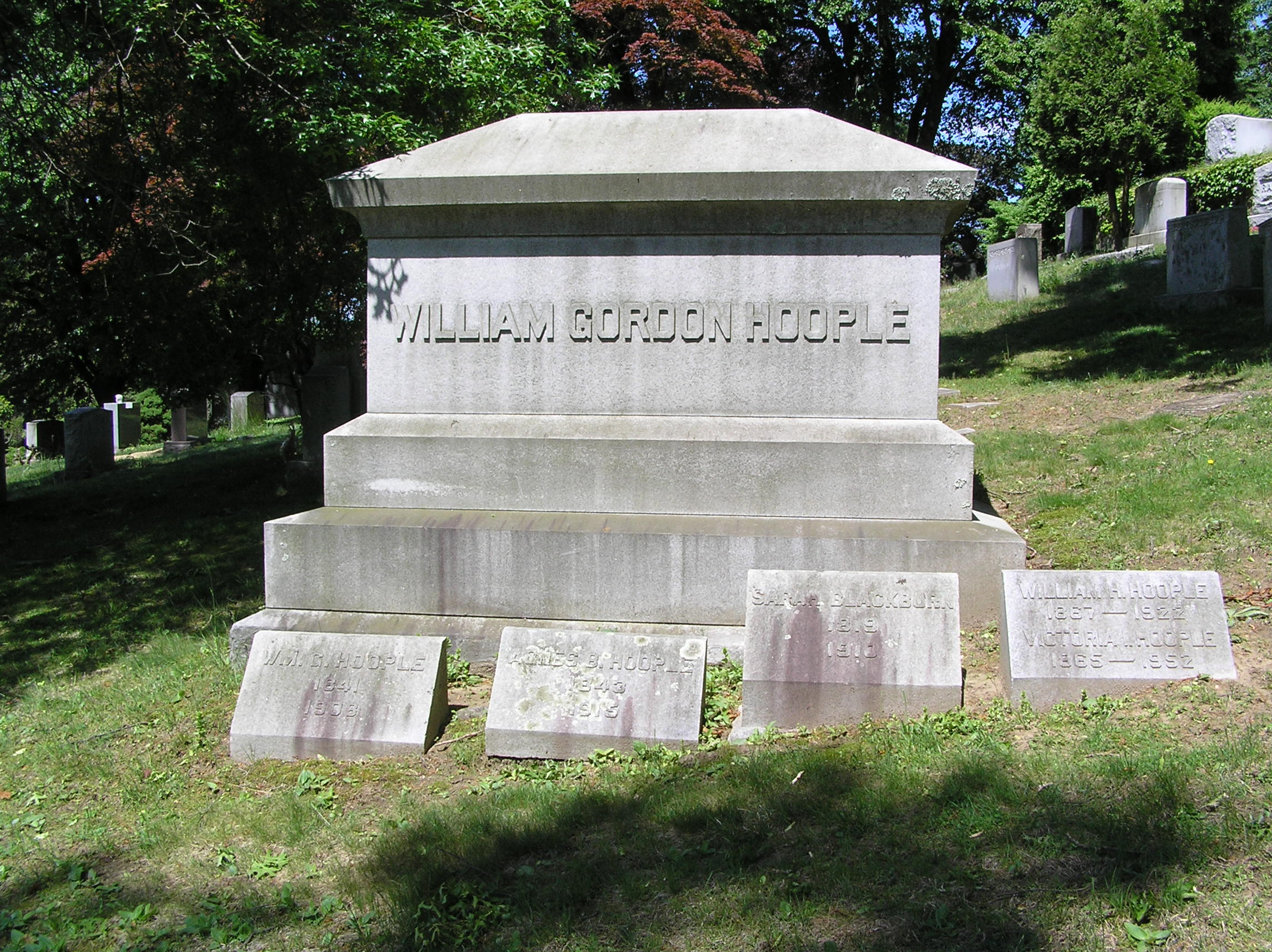
Lower right: The gravesite of William Howard Hoople

After a seven-week illness, Hoople died at age 54 on Friday, September 29, 1922, in his home at 277 Brooklyn Avenue, Brooklyn, of war-related injuries. Hoople's last words were reported to be: "Jesus is my best friend." After a funeral at 2 pm on Sunday, October 1 at the John Wesley Church of the Nazarene in Brooklyn,

== Legacy ==
By November 1930 a Nazarene congregation, which met in the Reformed Church of America's former Church of Jesus church building (which was originally built in 1891) at 64 Menahan Street (at the corner of Bushwick Avenue, Brooklyn), had been named the Hoople Church of the Nazarene.
