= Mary-Louise Hooper =

American heiress & activist (1907–1987)

Mary-Louise Fitkin Hooper
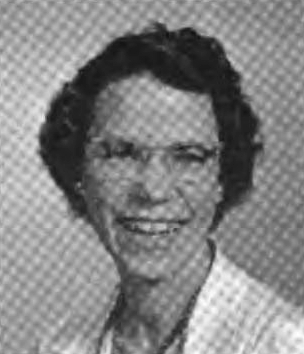
- Hooper in the Stanford University yearbook, 1955
- Born: March 2, 1907; Swampscott, Massachusetts
- Died: August 14, 1987 (aged 80); Klamath Falls, Oregon
- Citizenship: American
- Known for: Anti-apartheid activist

Mary-Louise Hooper (March 2, 1907 – August 14, 1987) was a American heiress and activist in the Civil Rights Movement and anti-apartheid movement. She was briefly imprisoned in Johannesburg, South Africa and subsequent exclusion from that country in 1957 and became a cause célèbre both in South Africa and the United States. Hooper was the first white member of the African National Congress, and was described by its National Executive as "one of our number, and a leading worker in the struggle for freedom and democracy", and was one of the ANC's three delegates to the first All-African Peoples' Conference in December 1958 in Accra, Ghana, and one of only two American observers at the Third All-African Peoples' Conference in Cairo, Egypt in March 1961. Hooper was also active in the NAACP, the American Friends Service Committee (AFSC), and was the West Coast representative of the American Committee on Africa (ACOA) from 1962 until about 1969. Hooper was the editor of the South African Bulletin from 1964 to 1968.

== Early life, family and education ==
Mary-Louise Fitkin was born on March 2, 1907, in Swampscott, Massachusetts, the only daughter and second oldest child of Susan Norris Fitkin (1870–1951), an ordained pastor in the Pentecostal Church of the Nazarene, and later the founding president of the Nazarene Women's Missionary Society (now Nazarene Mission International), and Abram Edward Fitkin (1878–1933), a former evangelist and pastor who had become a businessman. Mary-Louise had three brothers: Abram, Willis "Bud" and Ralph.

Mary-Louise attended the Church of the Nazarene with her family. By the end of 1907 Mary-Louise Fitkin, her parents, and brother, Raleigh, moved to Brooklyn because of her father's increased business activities. In 1907 the Fitkin family attended the John Wesley Pentecostal Church of the Nazarene located at the corner of Saratoga Avenue and Sumpter Street, Brooklyn, then pastored by William Howard Hoople.

Her younger brother, Willis, was born in 1908. By April 1910, the Fitkins lived in their own home on Wallis Avenue, Queens, New York. While living here, her youngest brother, Ralph was born in 1912.

In December 1919, Mary-Louise Fitkin organized the Do for Others Club, a boys' and girls' group for the Church of the Nazarene, whose purpose was to do whatever possible for the famine sufferers of India.

By January 1920 the Fitkin family resided at 271 Brooklyn Avenue, Brooklyn. By December 1926 the Fitkin family lived at 8 Remsen Street, Brooklyn Heights, Brooklyn.

Mary-Louise Fitkin attended Adelphi Academy at Lafayette Avenue, St. James Place and Clifton Place, Brooklyn, New York, and after graduation, she studied at Stanford University for one year until June 1928.

== Civil rights activities ==
Mary-Louise Hooper was committed to opposing racial injustice wherever she found it, saying: "the Freedom Struggle is one – Mississippi, South Africa." Before 1955 Hooper was "involved in interracial work in California" with the Council for Civic Unity (CCU), "the premier interracial organization working against discrimination in San Francisco, [whose] aim was to end discrimination in housing, employment, health, recreation, and welfare"; the National Association for the Advancement of Colored People (NAACP), and the American Friends Service Committee (AFSC).

=== Anti-apartheid activities ===
==== South Africa (1955–1957) ====
Mary-Louise Hooper, who was a Life Member of the NAACP, who had been "long active in volunteer work to better inter-racial relations", was also "an active supporter of African struggles against colonialism and apartheid". After a three-month tour of South Africa, Kenya, and Nigeria, with a group of Quakers in 1955, Hooper moved to South Africa later that year, eventually buying a home in Durban, South Africa. Hooper supported the African National Congress, and was described as "the only white person to ever work inside the African National Congress".

Returning to the US by June 1956 to seek permanent residence in South Africa, in San Francisco Hooper met with her friend African-American civil rights activist Ethel Ray Nance, secretary of the San Francisco branch of the NAACP; and, a week later, met with American civil rights activist, Pan-Africanist, author, writer and editor Dr. W. E. B. Du Bois in New York, with credentials from Chief Luthuli "authorizing her to act for him with the Committee on Africa". Travelling to London, England, through the influence of Du Bois, Hooper met Trinidadian Pan-Africanist, journalist, and author George Padmore, who in turn wrote her a letter of introduction to former revolutionary Kwame Nkrumah, then Prime Minister of Gold Coast, who later became the first Prime Minister and President of Ghana, and would lead the Gold Coast to independence from Britain in 1957. Hooper met with Nkrumah at least 5 times in the Gold Coast in 1956. Hooper also met with anti-apartheid activist Bishop Trevor Huddleston on that trip to London. By late August 1956 Hooper was in Lagos, Nigeria en route to her return to South Africa.

On her return to South Africa, Hooper continued to campaign for the abolition of apartheid, and worked as a volunteer aide and secretary to ANC president Chief Albert Luthuli, and was seen as a "fairy godmother" to the ANC, providing financial support, transportation in her "Congress Special" sedan, and hosting secret ANC meetings in her home. Hooper was active in providing financial assistance and other support for those tried during the Treason Trial. By January 1957, Hooper had moved to Hillbrow, a suburb of Johannesburg.

On March 10, 1957, Hooper was arrested and imprisoned for five days in what she described as "degrading and humiliating" conditions in the Fort Prison in Johannesburg. Despite being granted permanent visa status by February 1957, Hooper was ordered to be deported from South Africa after being accused of assisting South African "negroes". Hooper was freed by the Rand Supreme Court on a writ of habeas corpus, and later awarded damages, which she donated to the ANC. On May 14, 1957 Eben Dönges, the Interior Minister, ordered her deportation as he believed her presence in South Africa was not in the public interest. After fleeing South Africa via Rhodesia at the end of May 1957, she was excluded from re-entry by the South African government. She remained in correspondence with anti-apartheid activists, such as Nokukhanya Bhengu, wife of Albert Luthuli. They exchanged letters for decades.

==== All-African Peoples' Conferences (1958-1961) ====
Hooper served as one of the three official Africa National Congress delegates and the only American delegate to the first All-African Peoples' Conference in December 1958 in Accra, Ghana. Hooper was also a delegate to the 2nd Congress in Tunis, Tunisia in January 1960, and was one of only two American observers at the Third All-African Peoples' Conference in Cairo in March 1961, having been denied delegate status despite being appointed as an ANC representative by Chief Luthuli. By 1961 Hooper had made at least one trip of at least two months duration to Africa, visiting 24 African countries including Ghana, Nigeria, Senegal, Congo, Cameroun, Ethiopia, North Africa, and nearly all of East, Central and Southern Africa. Hooper numbered among her personal friends President Kwame Nkrumah of Ghana; Tom Mboya of Kenya, Chief Luthuli, Alan Paton and Oliver Tambo of South Africa; Bishop Trevor Huddleston of Tanganyika, Kenneth Kaunda of Northern Rhodesia, Ahmed Boumendjel of Algeria and Joshua Nkomo of Southern Rhodesia.

==== California (1957–1964) ====
After her return to the US in May 1957 Hooper continued to be active in her opposition to apartheid. Settling in San Francisco, Hooper stayed with African-American civil rights activist Ethel Ray Nance, secretary of the San Francisco branch of the NAACP. By 1958 Hooper had become the unpaid West Coast Representative of the American Committee on Africa (ACOA), and also served as director of the South Africa Program of ACOA. as well as for its Africa Defense and Aid Fund. Among her activities were giving interviews on radio, and television. Additionally, Hooper raised funds for the South African Defense Fund, which was to pay for the legal defence of those being prosecuted in the Treason Trial, and to support the families of political prisoners. In the middle of 1960 Hooper was credited with raising much of the $50,000 contributed to the South Africa Defense Fund (renamed the Africa Defense and Aid Fund in late 1959).

Hooper spoke frequently on "Human Rights in South Africa" to churches, and civic organizations, including to the Franklin Delano Roosevelt Democratic Club in Pasadena, California on April 20, 1960, on the topic "Africa, a Continent in Turmoil". In a November 1958 speech "South Africa Today" at the YWCA in Pasadena, California, Hooper claimed: "South Africa is the sorest spot on earth in regard to the color problem. People there are treated entirely on the basis of color, both politically, economically, socially and religiously."

On December 17, 1962, Hooper was the organizer of a picket by the NAACP, the Northern California Committee for Africa, and the Congress of Racial Equality of the Dutch freighter Raki, which had a load of asbestos, hemp, and coffee from South Africa, in San Francisco, to draw attention to racial discrimination in the Union of South Africa, and to encourage the US to join a United Nations boycott of South African goods.

==== New York (1964–1967) ====
In late 1964 Hooper moved to New York City to volunteer full-time as ACOA's Program Director for South Africa, and also appeared before the United Nations Special Committee against Apartheid, where she submitted verified statements of physical and mental torture, signed by South Africans detained under South Africa's 90-day law, which allowed the South African government to arrest and hold anyone "for indefinite detention without trial".

Hooper wrote prolifically on Africa and the issue of apartheid. From its inception in October 1964 to 1968 Hooper was the editor of the South African Bulletin (renamed Southern Africa Bulletin by March 1968) published by ACOA.

In December 1965 Hooper organized the Benefit for South African Victims of Apartheid Defense and Aid Fund at Hunter College in New York City on Human Rights Day (December 10), which attracted 3,500 attendees to hear the music of Pete Seeger and South African singer Miriam Makeba, as well Martin Luther King Jr., whom Hooper had convinced to speak at the Benefit. King, in his first major speech on South Africa, spoke against the evils of the apartheid regime (comparing it to Nazi Germany), criticizing US complicity with apartheid, and highlighting the obligations of black Americans to support those opposed to apartheid. King called for economic sanctions against South Africa.

In June 1966 Hooper helped initiate and organize the Declaration of American Artists Against Apartheid, "We Say No to Apartheid", which sought to prevent cultural contacts with the apartheid regime. 65 artists signed the Declaration, including Joan Baez, Tallulah Bankhead, Harry Belafonte, Saul Bellow, Leonard Bernstein, Victor Borge, Dave Brubeck, Carol Burnett, Diahann Carroll, Paddy Chayefsky, Ossie Davis, Sammy Davis Jr., Ruby Dee, Henry Fonda, John Forsythe, James Garner, Van Heflin, Lena Horne, Langston Hughes, Eartha Kitt, Miriam Makeba, Johnny Mathis, Karl A. Menninger, Burgess Meredith, Arthur Miller, Henry Morgan, Julie Newmar, Edmond O'Brien, Frederick O'Neal, Odetta, Sidney Poitier, John Raitt, Jerome Robbins, Paul Robeson, Pete Seeger, Nina Simone, Ed Sullivan, Eli Wallach, and Poppy Cannon White.

With Wendell Foster Hooper was an organizer and spokesman for the Committee of Conscience Against Apartheid, which by December 1966, had sixty prominent members, including Stokely Carmichael, Ossie Davis, Ruby Dee, Reinhold Niebuhr, Allen Ginsberg, Paddy Chayefsky, and Joan Baez. In December 1966 the CCAA urged American banks not to lend money to South Africa, and on December 7, 1966, claimed that in excess of $23 million had been withdrawn from First National City Bank and Chase Manhattan Bank by depositors in protest at their dealings with the South African regime.

In May 1967 Hooper testified before a committee of the United Nations Commission on Human Rights,

=== Other civil rights activities ===
Hooper supported the Front de Libération Nationale (FLN), in its efforts to gain independence for Algeria from France, writing Refugee Algerian Students in 1960.

During the Angolan War of Independence, Hooper raised awareness of the struggles and funds for refugees from Angola by speaking and presenting the NBC White Paper documentary Angola: Journey to a War, which was narrated by Chet Huntley.

== Personal life ==
Mary-Louise Fitkin was married three times, and had one child, Suzanne Mary Salsbury.

=== Esley Foster Salsbury (1927–1938) ===
On July 7, 1926, Mary-Louise accompanied her mother, Susan Norris Fitkin, on her first overseas trip as General President of the Nazarene Women's Missionary Society, which was a two-month tour of the British Isles and various European countries, including France; Switzerland; Austria; Germany; and Italy. Mary-Louise and her mother sailed from New York to Southampton, England, on the RMS Aquitania. While in Scotland, Mary-Louise spoke at the inaugural District Nazarene Young People's Society Convention in the British Isles. They departed Cherbourg, France, for New York on the Aquitania on September 14, 1926.

At noon on June 14, 1927, Mary-Louise married Esley Foster Salsbury (born August 28, 1907, in Elgin, Manitoba, Canada; died June 13, 1993, in Los Angeles, California), who had become a naturalized US citizen on May 13, 1926, at "Milestones", the family summer home at 16–18 Corlies Avenue, Allenhurst, New Jersey, in a ceremony conducted by Rev. Chauncey David Norris (born July 23, 1884, in West Berkshire, Vermont; died January 16, 1961, in Dundee, Oregon), a cousin of her mother, who was at that time pastor of the Church of the Nazarene at Berkeley, California.

In early December, 1928, Mary-Louise Salsbury accompanied her mother on her second missionary tour to Mexico.

By August 1929 the Salsburys lived at 1928 Montgomery Street, Berkeley, California. On August 30, 1929, the Salsburys departed San Francisco for a cruise to Honolulu on the SS President Jefferson, and returned to Wilmington, Los Angeles on the SS City of Los Angeles on September 27, 1929.

By April 1930 the Salsburys lived with Susan Norris Fitkin in her four-bedroom home (built in 1927) at 894 Longridge Road, Oakland, California. By 1931 E. Foster Salsbury was a vice-president and director of Pacific Freight Lines Corporation, Ltd., which was controlled by his father-in-law Abram Fitkin's American Utilities.

After a lengthy illness, Hooper's father Abram Fitkin died on Saturday, March 18, 1933, in his apartment at the Savoy-Plaza Hotel Fitkin left an estate estimated at $250,000,000. This is equivalent to $4,800,000,000 in 2024.

On December 7, 1933, the Salsburys' only child, Suzanne Mary Salsbury was born in Berkeley, California.

In early October, 1935, Mary-Louise accompanied her mother on a mission trip to Latin America via the Panama Canal, and included visits to Guatemala, Haiti, Bahamas, and Colombia. While in Cobán, Mary-Louise organized the first Young Woman's Missionary Society at the Nazarene Girls' School. Mary-Louise Salsbury wrote the story of this visit in a booklet, entitled Other Americas, published at her mother's expense with the proceeds going to the W.F.M.S. They returned to Los Angeles on November 11, 1935, after a six-day voyage in first class on the Santa Elena from San José, Guatemala.

During the Great Depression, E. Foster Salsbury, then living in Orinda, California, had a vision for "a cheap and cheerful vehicle that would propel the country forward to prosperous times", and with Austin Elmore invented the Salsbury Motor Glide,. a small scooter built initially in the back of a plumbing and heating shop in Oakland, California. Salsbury applied for a US patent for the Motor Glide in April 1936. The Salsbury Motor Corporation continued manufacturing motor scooters in Inglewood, California, until 1951., Foster Salsbury also invented a mobile commode in 1936.

By August 1938 the Salsburys divorced, with Foster Salsbury marrying Florence Johnson Fleming, a widow with two children, who was also the sister of William E. Johnson Jr. In 1938 Mary-Louise and Suzanne travelled to Germany.

=== Karl Josef Deissler (1938–1946) ===
By August 1938 Mary-Louise had married Dr. Karl Josef Deissler (born June 29, 1906, in Heidelberg, Germany; died August 15, 1998, in Bern, Switzerland), a German physician, who graduated from the University of Heidelberg, who had fled Germany for the US in September 1931 because of his liberal ideas and fears of Nazi persecution, and had been a fellow of the Mayo Clinic from 1931 to 1935. By November 1935 Dr. Deissler was practising as a physician in the Wakefield Building at 426 17th Street, Oakland, California. By August 1938 the Deisslers resided in a five-bedroom home built in 1937 at 50 Sotelo Avenue, Piedmont, California, "an isthmus of white wealth", and the "city of millionaires", where the Deisslers would live together until at least August 1942.

When her mother needed to visit the Territory of Hawaii in April 1940 due to her ill health, Mary-Louise was again her travel companion, travelling first class on the SS Matsonia from San Francisco to Honolulu on April 19, 1940.

When Dr. Deissler was excluded from the US western defense area on September 4, 1942, until November 17, 1943, as an enemy alien, Mary-Louise and her daughter lived in Illinois. In November 1944 Dr. Deissler resided at the home of his mother-in-law, 894 Longridge Road, Oakland, however Mary-Louise was not registered as living there at that time. The Deisslers divorced in 1946, and Mary-Louise and Suzanne moved to Carmel, California. Dr. Deissler married Dorothea D. Bickel (born about 1914) on December 29, 1947, in Reno, Nevada, had two children, Erika (born February 28, 1947, in San Francisco), and Karl Peter (born July 30, 1948, in San Francisco; died November 22, 1966, in Pomona, California), and divorced on October 1, 1962. The Deisslers lived in Orinda, California, in a home they bought from the noted psychoanalyst Erik Erikson.

=== Clifford Ison Hooper, Sr. (1947–1949) ===
On December 26, 1947, Mary-Louise married Clifford Ison "Cliff" Hooper Sr., (1917–2001), an African American widower with two infant sons, whom she had met while campaigning for the NAACP, in Seattle, Washington. Hooper, a former journalist and circulation manager with the Evansville Argus, the "city's only African American newspaper" that operated from June 1938 to October 1943; who had served in Civilian Conservation Corps in Indiana from 1935 to 1940, rising to the rank of Field Leader and First Sergeant; and had served in the US Army from June 1941, eventually being promoted to the rank of captain during World War II after postings in Alabama, Georgia, North Carolina, Ireland, and California. They married in Seattle, as Washington was one of the few states without Anti-miscegenation laws that banned inter-racial marriages. However, after a year of marriage, the Hoopers separated and were divorced in 1949. Cliff Hooper later became an artist, an activist, and a community leader, who co-founded the Negro Voters League, "a radical organization dedicated to the black power cause", and also promoted the black power agenda by being a co-editor and writing a column for the Afro American Journal, a local publication that served the black community. In 1970 his book "Black father black faith", a "meditation on racism in American society" was published, and by 1986 he wrote "A Black View of US American History" that "focused on racism and anti-Black legislation throughout American history".

By June 1950 Mary Louise had become a Quaker, and had moved to Carmel, California, where her daughter, Suzanne, attended the California College of Arts and Crafts in Berkeley, California, and in December 1950 married artist Lloyd David Cogley (1917–1992), and they subsequently had five sons. On October 18, 1951, Hooper's mother, Susan Norris Fitkin died in Oakland.

In September 1952 Hooper returned to New York after sailing from Rotterdam on the SS Nieuw Amsterdam. Hooper returned to Stanford University in 1953 to complete her degree, majoring in German, graduating with summa cum laude honors in June 1955. In May 1956 Hooper was elected to membership of the Stanford chapter of Phi Beta Kappa.

=== Final years ===
In 1981 Mary-Louise moved to Klamath Falls, Oregon, to be near her daughter and grandsons. Mary-Louise died in Klamath Falls on August 14, 1987.

== Works ==
=== As Mary-Louise Salsbury ===
- Other Americas. Kansas City, Mo: Woman's Missionary Society, Church of the Nazarene, 1936.

=== As Mary-Louise Hooper ===
- "We Shall Not Ride: The Johannesburg Bus Boycott", Africa Today 4:6 (November–December 1957):13–16;
- "The African Struggle for Freedom" (1959), cited in Algernon David Black, The Young Citizens: The Story of the Encampment for Citizenship (Ungar, 1962);
- "Luthuli, Man of Peace", in Woman's Peace Party, Four Lights: An Adventure in Internationalism 21–22 (Women's International League for Peace and Freedom, 1961);
- "The Axe Falls on the Whites", South Africa Bulletin 1 (October 1964):1, http://kora.matrix.msu.edu/files/50/304/32-130-A98-84-al.sff.document.acoa000026.pdf;
- "South Africa: ANC Leaders Hanged", in Africa Today Associates, American Committee on Africa, University of Denver Center on International Race Relations, Africa Today, (1964):10–11 (Indiana University Press, 1969);
- "Gestapo-Afrikaner Style", Africa Today (1964).
