= Abram Fitkin =

American minister, banker and businessman

Abram Edward Fitkin
- Born: September 18, 1878; Brooklyn, New York, US
- Died: March 18, 1933 (aged 54); Manhattan, New York, US
- Other name: A.E. Fitkin
- Occupations: Investment banker and philanthropist
- Spouse: Susan Norris Fitkin (m. 1896)

Abram Edward Fitkin (September 18, 1878 – March 18, 1933) was an American minister, investment banker, businessman, public utilities operator, and philanthropist, who founded and ran dozens of companies, including A.E. Fitkin & Co.; the National Public Service Corporation; the United States Engineering Corporation; and the General Engineering and Management Corporation, which by 1926 managed 178 utility companies in 18 US states and over 1,000 local communities. As a philanthropist Fitkin donated in excess of $3,000,000 to finance the construction of the Raleigh Fitkin Memorial Hospital in Manzini, Swaziland; the Raleigh Fitkin Memorial Institution in Scobeyville, New Jersey; the Raleigh Fitkin Memorial Pavilion for Children at the New Haven Hospital in Yale; and the Jersey Shore University Medical Center (formerly Raleigh Fitkin and Paul Morgan Memorial Hospital) at Neptune Township, New Jersey.

== Personal history ==
Abram Edward Fitkin was born on September 18, 1878, in Brooklyn, New York, the sixth son and 11th of thirteen children of Mary E. Vought and Thomas Furlong Fitkin, a harness-manufacturer. Fitkin's parents were married on December 31, 1861.

Fitkin was a member of the Andrews Methodist Episcopal Church at 95 Richmond Street, Brooklyn.

=== Ministry ===
On October 15, 1895, Fitkin met Susan W. "Susie" Norris, an ordained Canadian Quaker pastor, at a camp meeting in the Methodist Episcopal Church in Clintondale, New York.

For the next six months Fitkin was teamed with Susie Norris. The two grew close during this time and were married by Quaker minister William Thomas Willis on May 14, 1896.

After their wedding, the Fitkins continued to hold revival meetings. In November 1896, Fitkin and Susan opened a church in a former blacksmith shop in Hopewell Junction, New York. At Fitkin's recommendation, the church affiliated with the newly established Association of Pentecostal Churches of America (APCA), a Holiness denomination led at that time by William Howard Hoople. Soon after the Fitkins started another church in Cornwall, New York, which they also pastored. In April 1897 Fitkin was dropped from membership by the Marlborough Monthly Meeting because he has become a member of another denomination. In 1898 Fitkin was ordained as a minister in the APCA at Brooklyn.

By 1900 Fitkin and Susan were co-pastors of the APCA church in South Manchester, Connecticut, where they lived in a rented house on Main Street. During the last four months of 1900, Fitkin and his wife devoted their efforts to traveling evangelism.

=== After ministry ===
Fitkin left pastoral ministry and ceased his evangelistic work to devote his attention to making sufficient income to support both his family and his future ministry. Fitkin admitted to his friend, Rev. E. G. Anderson, that at first he only aimed to make enough to be independent in God's work. The goal he set was a half million.

Abram and Susan Fitkin had four children: A. Raleigh, Mary-Louise, Willis Carradine, and Ralph MacFarland.

One of Fitkin's last ministry activities was as one of the preachers at the dedication of new church and parsonage for the Emmanuel Pentecostal Church at Peabody, Massachusetts, on June 3, 1906.

Fitkin and Susan, and their two children moved to Brooklyn because of Fitkin's increased business activities. By April 1910 the Fitkins lived in their own home on Wallis Avenue, Queens, New York. While living here, their fourth child, Ralph MacFarland was born March 7, 1912.

After a fishing trip with his father in August 1914, Raleigh Fitkin was thrown from their car after its axle broke. Despite an operation in a home in Allenhurst, New Jersey, and the efforts of six physicians, on September 14, 1914, Raleigh died. Raleigh had indicated that he wanted to be a missionary to Africa. Raleigh's funeral was held in Allenhurst, New Jersey.

By June 1927, Fitkin and his wife lived at a large estate, called "Milestones", that overlooked the Atlantic Ocean in Allenhurst, New Jersey. After a trip to California, Fitkin relocated the original colonial house to the rear of the property, and had a 20-room, 3-story bungalow constructed in its place for the family residence. On June 14, 1927, Fitkin's only daughter, Mary-Louise, married Esley Foster Salsbury (1907–1993) at "Milestones", in a ceremony conducted by her cousin, Rev. Chauncey David Norris. On October 21, 1927, Willis C. Fitkin married Helen Shubert at the St. Paul Methodist Episcopal Church in Ocean Grove, New Jersey.

In July 1928 Fitkin took possession of the yacht Memory III, which was designed by Philadelphia naval architect Thomas D. Bowes and built by Defoe Boat and Motor Works of Bay City, Michigan specifically for Fitkin in 1927–28. In August 1928, Fitkin's other yacht, Adios II, valued at $100,000, was attacked by a former steward who been fired by Fitkin.

In October 1928, Fitkin was threatened with a loaded rifle by a US Coast Guard officer while on his way up the Shrewsbury River in a motor launch, as it was suspected he may have been involved in smuggling alcohol in violation of Prohibition laws. Angered by what he considered the officer's rude manner, Fitkin, "a lifelong Republican", vowed to vote for Democrat Al Smith in the 1928 US presidential elections.

== Career ==
In 1900 Fitkin began his business career in Boston as a bookkeeper, before moving to New York to become a manager at Pelser, Welker & Co., a financial firm that dealt mainly in railroad securities. Fitkin formed Fitkin Securities Corp. as a holding company for all of his interests; and in 1908 Fitkin formed a partnership with WC Harty, under the name of A.E. Fitkin & Co, which operated as an investment bank and security brokerage, specializing in public utility securities. In December 1912 A.E. Fitkin & Co. published a stock and bond sheet listing 600 unlisted securities. Additionally, Fitkin created the United States Engineering Corp., an engineering and management subsidiary.

Eventually Fitkin accumulated $75,000 from commissions, which he used as the "seed money" for his future success. From 1912 Fitkin, later described as "a utility czar", and as "a confident, testy builder and vendor of public utility systems", focused on the acquisition, management, and sale of public utilities. The Los Angeles Times later described Fitkin's strategy: "A.E. Fitkin, who makes a business of buying strategically located public utility properties, building them up with new capital and expert management, and selling the revamped set-up to one of its larger competitors."

=== 1913–1920 ===
After borrowing $400,000 from a friend at the Guaranty Trust Company, in 1913 Fitkin bought control of The San Angelo Water, Light & Power Co. at San Angelo, Texas. Before World War I, A.E. Fitkin & Co. drew on capital from New York, Chicago, and Saint Louis to acquire and consolidate a number of East Texas utility companies. In 1916 A.E. Fitkin & Co. purchased the H. M. Spalding Electric Light Plant in Concordia, Kansas, for $550,000.

In 1918 A.E. Fitkin & Co. purchased a site on San Jacinto Bay and established an oil refinery for the manufacture of lubricants. In May 1919 A.E. Fitkin & Co. sold most of their stock in the Mexican-Pantjo Oil Co.

In 1919 the Century Oil Company was incorporated by the General Engineering and Management Corporation, one of the subsidiaries of A.E. Fitkin Co. On October 30, 1924, Century Oil Company was put into receivership, along with six of its subsidiaries at the request of Fitkin.

By August 1919 A.E. Fitkin & Co. had its headquarters at 141 Broadway, Manhattan, and branch offices in Boston, Pittsburgh, and Chicago.

=== 1921–1927 ===
On October 1, 1921, Fitkin bought the St. Petersburg Electric Light and Power Co. from Bird Malcolm Latham and renamed it the Pinellas County Power Co., which later became the Florida Power Corporation.

On April 22, 1922, A.E. Fitkin & Co. purchased The Tidewater Power Company of Wilmington, N.C., which controlled the electric light, gas, and street railway companies of Wilmington, North Carolina, from Hugh MacRae for $5,000,000. Fitkin became president and Harty became vice president.

On October 30, 1922, Fitkin took over the Clearwater Lighting Company in Clearwater, Florida, through the Tide Water Power Company, and merged its assets with those of the St. Petersburg Lighting Company on November 15, 1922, to create the original Florida Power Corporation. Fitkin was president of FPC until he appointed Bird Latham on October 25, 1925. In February 1923 Fitkin was able to announce a minimum 12% reduction in power rates for St. Petersburg customers.

In 1923 A.E. Fitkin & Co. had established the National Public Service Corporation, with Fitkin as president, to be a holding company for their utilities in eight US states, including its Jersey Central Power and Light Company.

In February 1924 A.E. Fitkin & Co. negotiated the purchase of the Miami Municipal street railway from Carl G. Fisher, after having already purchased the electric light and power plant at Miami Beach and the Miami Beach Electric Railway for $1,500,000.

On March 16, 1924, A.E. Fitkin & Co. announced that they had acquired the Tri-County Electric Co. of Pompton Lakes, and the Consolidated Gas Company of New Jersey, which they would merge with their Jersey Central Power and Light Corporation.

By 1925 Fitkin had formed the Fitkin Realty and Improvement Company of Delaware, with one of its first projects the sale for $80,000 of a property at 5th Street and 1st Avenue South in St. Petersburg, Florida, to the Pinellas County Power Co. for the construction of the Florida Power Building, the headquarters of the Florida Power Corporation.

In March 1925 the National Public Service Corporation acquired an additional seven utility companies in three states. By December 1925 Fitkin's utility companies served more than 700 communities in fifteen US states.

In January 1926 Fitkin Utilities acquired the Newport News Hamilton Railway, Gas and Electric Company of Virginia.

By the end of February 1926, A.E. Fitkin's companies were operating in 18 states, and had increased its capital from $30,000,000 to $171,000,000 in the previous four years. At that time, Bird Latham retired from his role in Fitkin's companies, proclaiming Fitkin, "one of the greatest men in America today, a big man who has really put sentiment into business".

By March 1, 1926, Fitkin Utilities had acquired The Southside Virginia Power Co., and merged with its previous acquisitions in Virginia to form the Virginia Public Service Corporation, a subsidiary of National Public Service Corporation.

In April 1926 Fitkin gave 10,000 shares of General Engineering and Management Corporation, which at that time managed the 178 companies in the Fitkin Utility group, to the company's 35 executives and department heads, in recognition of their efforts, saying: "those who devote their energies to upbuilding a concern are entitled to participate in benefits which their help creates".

On June 1, 1926, North Carolina governor Angus Wilton McLean opened the one-mile long concrete Wrightsville Beach causeway to Wrightsville Beach, North Carolina, financed and constructed by A.E. Fitkin & Co. for $126,000, through a subsidiary, Wilmington-Wrightsville Beach Causeway Company., which charged users 10 cents to cross. The Tide Water Power Company sold lots to develop Shore Acres.

Fitkin boosted Florida's economic opportunities, and was a dominant force during and but especially after the Florida land boom of the 1920s, purchasing undeveloped tracts of land, building and enlarging power plants due to anticipated and actual population increases, and then connecting the new communities to his various utilities, including the Georgia Power & Light Co. (later Georgia-Florida Power Co.), and selling the land with substantial profits.

In June 1926, A.E. Fitkin & Co. merged 24 public utility companies held by Commonwealth Light and Power and by the Interstate Electric Corporation into a new Inland Power & Light Corporation. In October 1927 Fitkin sold Inland Power & Light Co. to Samuel Insull and his interests, for $30,000,000. By October 1926 Fitkin's utility companies served more than 1,000 communities in the US.

In November 1926 Fitkin merged four of his utilities companies in Florida into a new Florida Power Corporation, which had been organized and incorporated by the National Public Service Corporation in February 1925 to take over the physical properties of the old Florida Power Corporation (incorporated in 1922). On 1 March 1927 the organization of the new Florida Power Corporation, to be under the control of the National Public Service Corporation, was completed with the merger of the old Florida Power Corporation (1922), the Pinellas County Power Co., and the Central Florida Power & Light Co., valued at $20,000,000, and making it the largest electric power organization in Florida.

In late 1926 Fitkin group purchased from Lemuel Green the West Missouri Power Company, which was to be merged with the Missouri Public Service Company (MPS). By February 1927 Fitkin's companies provided utilities to 1,146 communities in 16 US states.

In 1927 Fitkin sold his interests in the "Shore Acres" real estate development on Harbor Island, South Carolina, to Oliver T. Wallace and Richard L. Player.

Fitkin was optimistic about Florida's economic recovery after the collapse of the Florida Boom in 1925, and invested heavily in Florida, indicating in March 1927: "We have invested many millions in Florida and the investment has been profitable. We have abundant faith in Florida's future and we are planning to extend our investment and our service to Florida by the expenditure of many more millions of dollars in permanent construction". In July 1926 Fitkin & Co. indicated it would spend $12,000,000 to construct underground conduit in St. Petersburg, Florida, and power lines from there to other cities on Florida's west coast, and 88 communities on the east coast.

On March 1, 1927, Fitkin sold its interest in the National Public Service Corporation to Day & Zimmermann for $250,000,000. On March 25, 1927, A. E. Fitkin & Co. sold control Western United Corporation to Day & Zimmerman. On October 27, 1927, A.E. Fitkin & Co. sold its interests in Commonwealth Light & Power Co. to Insull Son & Co., and in late 1927 Insull also acquired the Florida Power Corporation from the A.E. Fitkin & Co.

=== 1927–1933 ===
In October 1927 Fitkin announced his retirement from the public utilities field to engage in Stock Exchange and investment activities. A few days later Fitkin purchased a seat on the New York Stock Exchange for $255,000 from Walter L. Ross, but the Admissions Committee rejected Fitkin's admission at that time. On October 26, 1927, Fitkin left New York to establish branches in Europe for his stockbroking business.

In June 1928 Fitkin's personal fortune was estimated at $30,000,000. In January 1928 Fitkin formed A.E. Fitkin Co., Inc., with offices in New York, Chicago and Los Angeles. and later opened branches in San Francisco and Seattle. Also in 1928 Fitkin formed A.E. Fitkin & Sons, Inc.

In the summer of 1929 Fitkin formed the United American Utilities, Inc. as an investment trust, which later created the Pacific Freight Lines Corporation, Ltd as its subsidiary.

In early October 1929, just weeks before the Wall Street crash, A.E. Fitkin & Co sold control of Pacific Public Service Co. to Standard Oil of California for $26,801,327, which through subsidiaries operated the largest bottled spring and distilled water business in the world, supplied electric light, power and natural gas to 80 California communities in two areas, including the industrial region in Contra Costa County, and the city of Santa Cruz; owned 21 plants for the production of butane gas, including one at El Centro, then largest in the U.S.; and owned ice and cold storage plants, a 12-mile refrigeration pipeline that ran through the business district of Los Angeles, serving office buildings, markets and theatres, to Standard Oil Company of California for $26,801,327. By late 1929 A.E. Fitkin Limited had opened branches in Los Angeles and San Francisco, but had closed its branch in Boston.

On January 2, 1930, Fitkin announced the reorganization of A.E. Fitkin & Co., which included the formation of Fitkin & Co., Ltd., an investment and securities corporation, that would succeed A.E. Fitkin & Co. David A. Pepp of Los Angeles was appointed president of A. E Fitkin & Co., Ltd.

In 1930 Fitkin became board chairman of American Gas & Power Co.

In 1930 Fitkin gained control of Atlantic Public Utilities, Inc., which controlled the water supply of 200 communities on the Atlantic seaboard, but which had been placed in receivership after a drought. In June 1931 Fitkin sold the utility assets of Atlantic Public Utilities, Inc., to Samuel Insull, giving him a foothold in every Atlantic State except Rhode Island, and an additional 10 million customers. Fitkin retained the water and ice properties and the Cleveland Southwestern railroad system.

In January 1932 Fitkin re-entered the market and acquired control of the American Gas and Power Company, which was in receivership. After Fitkin's death, control of American Gas and Power was acquired by F.W. Seymour through his purchase of its holding company, Community Gas & Power Co., in September 1934.

In June 1932 Fitkin created A.E. Fitkin & Sons, a new securities brokerage, which succeeded A.E. Fitkin & Co., which admitted his two sons, W.C. Fitkin and Ralph F. Fitkin, as partners.

== Philanthropy ==
The death of Fitkin's oldest son, Raleigh (born September 3, 1904), "the light of the father's eye", on September 7, 1914, was the primary factor in Fitkin's philanthropic enterprises. According to Basil Miller: "The lad Raleigh was to play an important role in the family's missionary future. ... [T]he boy's interest in missions prompted his father Abram to build at a cost of thousands of dollars the Raleigh Fitkin Memorial Hospital in Africa". Fitkin's ability to make money financed his wife's ministry,

into which her husband's generosity in the span of his life poured a fortune. For during the days of her active service, she was to cover the foreign world more extensively than any church sire or leader among the Nazarenes. All of this was made possible by Abram's midas' touch. Traveling more than a half-million missionary miles, she did so without cost to the church she loved so deeply. Likewise she contributed through Mr. Fitkin's successes the expenses of her companion on home and foreign trips, as well as making liberal missionary donations. In the dim backdrop of this was Raleigh, whose missionary zeal and interest so touched his father's heartstrings that he could but be generous with God's work and philanthropic causes.

While his wife dedicated her energies to promoting the missionary program of the Church of the Nazarene (in partnership with Hiram F. Reynolds) in her capacity as the unpaid founding president of the Nazarene Women's Missionary Society for almost 33 years from September 30, 1915, "her husband poured into the cause of philanthropy and missions millions in memory of their beloved son Raleigh. That thread of interest wove in and out of A. E. Fitkin's career until he died. The dream of perpetuating Raleigh's memory was not one that came early and then vanished. But the father did good deed after good deed until his end". According to Basil Miller: "Throughout the years of Mrs. Fitkin's missionary travels as president of the W.F.M.S., he financed liberally all her expenses as well as those of her companions en route. In addition there were large gifts directly to missionary causes, these amounts going far over the ten thousand mark in some years".

=== Raleigh Fitkin Memorial Church of the Nazarene, Swaziland (1916) ===
Early in 1916, Susan Fitkin began dreaming of building a missionary chapel in Africa in memory of Raleigh. Abram Fitkin provided the funds to construct the Raleigh Fitkin Memorial church, "the first tangible memorial to that would-be child missionary, Raleigh", at Piggs Peak, Swaziland.

=== Raleigh Fitkin Memorial Hospital, Piggs Peak, Swaziland (1919–1925) ===
In October 1916 the Fitkins advised Hiram F. Reynolds, a general superintendent of the Church of the Nazarene and head of its foreign missionary program, that they would "provide the money for the erection of a memorial hospital in Africa." The Fitkins donated funds to build the Raleigh Fitkin Memorial Hospital, a small 18-bed facility built on the Nazarene mission compound at Piggs Peak, Swaziland from April 1919, and opened in 1920. By 1919 the Nazarene mission station at Piggs Peak, formerly known as the Camp Station, was renamed the Fitkin Memorial Station.

In 1925 the Swaziland government granted 35 acres of land fifty miles further south at Bremersdorp to the Church of the Nazarene for a hospital closer to the population centre of the country. After the opening of the new Raleigh Fitkin Memorial Hospital in 1927, the old hospital building was used to house a portion of the Piggs Peak Nazarene Primary School.

=== Raleigh Fitkin Memorial Hospital, Bremersdorp, Swaziland (1927) ===
Excluding the $10,000 contributed by members of the Church of the Nazarene from 1926, the Fitkins and Mrs. Ada E. Bresee were the principal donors of the substantial amount given to build the replacement 80-bed Raleigh Fitkin Memorial Hospital (RFMH) for the Church of the Nazarene in Bremersdorp, Swaziland. By June 1925 the first stage was dedicated, and on July 16, 1927, RFMH hospital was dedicated by Susan Norris Fitkin.

=== Raleigh Fitkin Memorial Institution, New Jersey (1927) ===
By July 1927 Fitkin bought a 160-acre farm on the south side of the county road between Colt's Neck and Scobeyville, New Jersey, for $26,000, which included an apple and peach orchards, crops, livestock, farm machinery, outbuildings and a century-old fifteen room house, which Fitkin intended to have enlarged and remodeled in order to use as an orphanage.

Later in 1927 Fitkin donated $1,000,000 to build and endow the Raleigh Fitkin Memorial Institution, a hospital and home for crippled children on the state highway, between Eatontown and Freehold in Shrewsbury Township, New Jersey. The plans included the purchase of 200 acres to establish a self-supporting farm to fund the institute.

=== Raleigh Fitkin Memorial Pavilion for Children, Connecticut (1928–1930) ===
On June 15, 1928, Fitkin donated $1,000,000 to Yale University for the care and treatment of children in memory of his oldest son, Raleigh, with $500,000 for the study of children's diseases, and another $500,000 for the construction of a 125-bed hospital at the New Haven Hospital at 789 Howard Avenue in New Haven, Connecticut, to be designed by Henry Colden Pelton (born October 18, 1868, in New York; died on August 28, 1935, in New York City), who had previously designed Christodora House (1928), the Babies and Children's Hospital of New York at the Columbia Presbyterian Medical Center (1928), and the Riverside Church (1930).

Escalating construction costs resulted in Fitkin donating an additional $100,000 in June 1929 to build the now larger six-story 136-bed Raleigh Fitkin Memorial Pavilion for Children. Fitkin's donation allowed the expansion and consolidation of pediatric inpatient facilities in a single building, close to the departmental offices and clinic facilities. Fitkin dedicated the hospital on February 8, 1930, however at that time only two of five floors of the Fitkin buildings were assigned to pediatrics. According to Howard Pearson, "Fifty inpatient beds were on Fitkin 3 and Fitkin 4, and included two air-conditioned rooms for premature infants. The outpatient clinic had 20 examining rooms on the third floor of the Clinic Building. There were two pediatric infectious disease wards on the second floor of the Isolation Building. This set-up remained essentially the same for the next 25 years". The Fitkin wards remained the inpatient pediatric service at the hospital until the 1980s.

Also in 1928 $1,000,000 was given to create the Ralph Fitkin Ward Unit in honor of Fitkin's youngest son for the "study and treatment of diseases of childhood".

=== Raleigh Fitkin-Paul Morgan Memorial Hospital, New Jersey (1930) ===
In order to honor his deceased son, and also A.E. Fitkin & Co. Vice-President Paul L. Morgan (born about 1896; died March 1929), who died of pneumonia at the age of 32, by May 1930 Fitkin contributed $500,000 to the Spring Lake Hospital Society to build the Fitkin-Morgan Memorial Hospital at Corlies Avenue in Neptune Township, New Jersey. On November 19, 1930, Fitkin laid one of the cornerstones for the hospital, which was opened on Thursday, November 19, 1931. The hospital was founded as "a voluntary non-profit, general hospital "with the aim of providing "medical and surgical care and nursing service to the sick and injured who need the services of the hospital, regardless of their ability to pay".

In 1966 the hospital's corporate name was changed to Jersey Shore University Medical Center – Fitkin Hospital.

=== Church of the Nazarene ===
Fitkin also paid off the $50,000 mortgage of the John Wesley Church of the Nazarene, where he held his church membership since 1907. In 1927 Fitkin and his wife gave $14,000 for Nazarene missions.

=== DeWint Home (1932) ===
Fitkin was affiliated with several fraternal organizations, including the Corson Commandery, No. 15, of the Knights Templar, in Asbury Park, New Jersey. By 1928 Fitkin was a member of the Altair Lodge No. 601 of the Grand Lodge of Free and Accepted Masons in Brooklyn, and served on its Board of Trustees Masonic Hall and Asylum Fund. In May 1932 Fitkin was one of the four primary benefactors who purchased the historic Johannes de Wint home at Tappan, New York, where George Washington had made his temporary headquarters on four separate occasions during the American Revolutionary War, and then gave it to the Grand Lodge of Free and Accepted Masons of the State of New York to convert into a museum.

== Death ==
After a lengthy illness, Fitkin died of chronic myocarditis and interstitial neuritis in the morning of Saturday, March 18, 1933, in his apartment at the Savoy-Plaza Hotel Fitkin left an estate estimated at $250,000,000. at the corner of Fifth Avenue and 59th Street in Manhattan, New York. After a funeral on Monday, March 20, 1933, at his Allenhurst, New Jersey, home, he was buried in Brooklyn near his son, Raleigh.

According to Fitkin's friend, Rev. Elmer G. Anderson: "While he had left the ministry, and lived during these years without God, still there was a tenderness in his heart concerning the work of the Kingdom. He was a man that literally lived under conviction. I have seen him close his door, refuse all appointments that might have meant thousands of dollars, and say to me, 'Elmer, read the Bible and pray with me.' Nor did he dispose of his early holiness and ministerial books." Fitkin's wife believed that on his death bed, when he was only fifty-four, he had returned to God. According to Miller: "She and the ministers who were his personal friends, E.G. Anderson and W.B. Riley, prayed for hours with him, until God gave Mrs. Fitkin the assurance that he had come back to the Father's home."

== Bibliography ==
- Miller, Basil (1948). Susan N. Fitkin: For God and Missions. Kansas City, MO: Nazarene Publishing House.
