= Susan Norris Fitkin =

Canadian ordained minister (1870–1951)

- Born: Susanah W. Norris; March 31, 1870; Ely, Quebec, Canada
- Died: October 18, 1951 (aged 81); Oakland, California, U.S.
- Other names: Susie Norris, Susie Fitkin, S.N. Fitkin,
- Occupations: ordained minister, pastor, evangelist, missionary society president
- Years active: 1893-1948
- Spouse: Abram Fitkin (m. 1896; died 1933)

Susan Norris Fitkin (March 31, 1870 – October 18, 1951) was a Canadian ordained minister, who served successively in the Society of Friends, the Association of Pentecostal Churches of America, and finally in the Church of the Nazarene. Fitkin was the founder and first president of the Church of the Nazarene's Women's Foreign Missionary Society (now Nazarene Missions International) from September 1915 until her retirement in June 1948. Fitkin served twenty-four years on the General Board of the Church of the Nazarene. In 1924 Fitkin and her husband Abram Fitkin funded and founded the Fitkin Memorial Hospital in Manzini, Swaziland, and also funded and founded Nazarene Bible Training Schools in China, and Beirut, Lebanon.

== Early life and family ==
Susanah W. "Susie" Norris was born March 31, 1870, on a farm in Ely, Quebec, Canada, the fourth oldest of the nine children of John Norris (born June 25, 1835, in Russelltown, Châteauguay, Quebec, Canada East; died December 20, 1887, in East Farnham, Quebec, Canada), a farmer and the foreman of a lumber camp, and his wife, Susannah Townsend Hall (born March 16, 1834, in East Farnham, Quebec, Canada East; died March 28, 1918, in Cliftondale, Massachusetts). John Norris and Susannah Hall were married on April 10, 1855, in Farnham East. Her siblings were George Miron Norris (born July 1, 1859, in East Farnham, Quebec), Hannah Norris (born August 8, 1861, in Sainte-Cécile-de-Milton, Quebec; died August 23, 1897, in Shefford, Quebec), Annie Louise Norris (born May 2, 1865, in Sainte-Cécile-de-Milton, Quebec), Jane "Janie" May Norris (born March 4, 1872, in Sainte-Cécile-de-Milton, Quebec), John Milton "Johnny" Norris (born November 15, 1873, in Sainte-Cécile-de-Milton, Quebec), Emma Norris (born April 11, 1875, in Quebec, Canada), Charles Newel Norris (born January 29, 1877, in Sainte-Cécile-de-Milton, Quebec), Alice "Nellie" Norris (born June 15, 1880, in Sainte-Cécile-de-Milton, Quebec).

By the time of the first Canadian census in April 1871, the Norris family had been living on a farm in Sainte-Cécile-de-Milton, Quebec for about eleven years, with John described as a Methodist farmer, while Susannah and their four children (including one-year-old "Suza") were described as Episcopalians. Later Norris' parents were members of the Society of Friends, who were active in the temperance reform movement. Her mother served once as a delegate to the Woman's Christian Temperance Union convention in Ottawa.

At the time of the second Canadian census in April 1881, John and Suzanne Norris and their nine children (including 11-year-old "Suza") were still living on a farm in Ely South, in Shefford, Quebec, and were described as Episcopalians. However, later in 1881, the Norris family moved back to East Farnham, Quebec, where Susanna's parents George C. Hall and Hannah Hall held longstanding membership in a Quaker meeting house. The Norris family attended Quaker worship but also attended the local Church of England. On February 23, 1886, five of John and Susanna's younger children were baptized by Revd John Merrick in the Church of England at Adamsville in East Farnham. On June 19, 1887, Anna Louise was baptized by Charles P. Abbott in the Church of England in Ely. On December 20, 1887, Norris' father John died in East Farnham, and was buried in quaker cemetery, Friends Cemetery East Farnham Monteregie Region, Quebec, Canada

=== Conversion ===
At the age of seventeen Norris was diagnosed with cancer, and given a prognosis of no more than two years to live. After being bedridden for the next two years, in March 1890 Norris was converted to a saving knowledge of Christ. In her autobiography Susan Norris Fitkin wrote:

Just as everything in my life, from the human standpoint, looked blackest, a new interest was suddenly awakened. A traveling Quaker preacher held some cottage meetings in our town. I attended and began to realize that even though I was a consistent church member, I was not a Bible Christian. ... I went to the altar seeking God, but was ignorant of the way of faith and did not get through to victory, but continued to pray and search the Scriptures for light and blessing. I began now with new interest to attend the Quaker meetings in the old Meeting House, which was up on a hill almost directly across the highway from my home. My grandparents had been consistent members here all their lives. Many aged saints still gathered there and gave wonderful testimonies about knowing their sins were all forgiven and their names written in the Lamb's Book of Life. The Grace of conviction deepened in my heart. I found only warnings as I read my Bible. I became very miserable and knew I was a lost soul and on my way to hell. Finally I found some comfort in the fifty-third chapter of Isaiah, and began to realize a little of God's gracious provision for lost souls in the tragedy of the cross, portrayed by the prophet, and the goodness of God led me to repentance. I was not only sorry for the past, but gladly forsook all worldliness and sin, and continued earnestly to seek God. I had not yet learned the way of faith, but one day, when turning the pages of my Bible and praying for a message, these words seemed to stand out in raised letters: “I have blotted out thy sins as a thick cloud, and will remember them no more forever.” I wondered if it could really mean me, or how I could make it mine, when suddenly another verse in the New Testament seemed to be emphasized in the same manner. As I read “He that believeth on the Son hath eternal life,” I said: “Oh, if I just believe, I shall have it,” and as my faith looked up to God and I trusted His word, the burden rolled away and heavenly light flooded my soul. I was a new creature; everything seemed new, — the sun, the trees, the green fields, the birds, all seemed new. Old things had passed away. My heart was filled with joy and gladness. God in His great love and mercy had given me a sky-blue conversion, which the devil was never able to make me doubt. What a marvelous Grace that brings us into the family of God, and gives us victory over the world, the flesh and the devil!"

To the displeasure of some friends and family members, after her conversion Susan Norris began attending the Union Chapel, an interdenominational church in East Farnham that was strongly evangelical in emphasis, instead of the local Church of England.!" According to Nazarene historian Stan Ingersol "Each different strain of piety nourished her spiritual development. Several encounters with life-threatening illnesses, including typhoid fever, heightened her seriousness toward religion. At times, she experienced unusual dreams and saw visions."

Late in the summer of 1890 Norris was stricken with typhoid. In her autobiography, Fitkin described a dream she had at this time: "At the end of this valley was a gate with a beautiful heavenly light streaming through, and lighting up the entire scene. Oh, I was so happy! I said, 'It is not dark at all; death is only a shadow.' Then the Lord whispered to me, and asked if I wanted to go in. I replied, 'Whatever is Thy will; I would not turn my hand over to decide.'" When dawn broke, Norris awakened, as one who had been refreshed by hidden springs of life. She said to the family, "I am going to get well." Gradually Norris recovered her health during the next few months.

In December 1890 Norris had a vision of Christ's Second Coming where she was intensely happy until she realized that many people would not be going to heaven. In her autiobiography Norris described her vision of Christ: "I ran to the door to meet Him when I was startled with loud wailing cries, and looking back, I saw most of the people on their faces, crying out in fear and anguish." Norris claimed that after she woke that she became conscious of the presence of Jesus: "It was like a person standing by my bed and in an audible voice saying solemnly: 'Go ye into all the world, and preach the gospel to every creature.'" Consequently, Norris believed God was calling her to be a missionary preacher. However, when she offered herself as a missionary to the Toronto headquarters of the China Inland Mission in 1891, Norris was refused for health reasons. Norris later indicated she came across Ezekiel 3:5 and the words jumped out at her: "For thou art not sent to a people of a strange speech and of an hard language." Norris accepted this an indication that God did not want her to go to a foreign land as a missionary.

=== Consecration ===
In April 1891 Susan Norris was employed as a dressmaker and living on her widowed mother's farm in Farnham East with her an older sister Anna, and six younger siblings. In 1891 visiting English evangelists, who were staying in her family home, led Norris into a deeper relationship with God. On the flyleaf of her Bible she wrote her consecration creed, which "helped and steadied me many times through the coming years." This was as follows: "My Consecration -- I am willing-- To take what Thou givest; To lack what Thou withholdest; To relinquish what Thou takest; To go where Thou commandest; To be what Thou requirest; I am, O Lord, wholly and forever Thine." Soon after Norris began conducting services for youth in her community and then, at her mother's urging, in other communities. Out of this, her ministry as an evangelist began emerging around 1892.

In Summer 1892 Norris was elected by her local Christian Endeavor Society to be a delegate to the first world convention of the Young People's Society of Christian Endeavour at Madison Square Garden in New York City, where she met J. Walter Malone (born August 11, 1857, near Marathon, Ohio; died December 30, 1935, in Cleveland Ohio), leader in the fast-growing holiness wing of the Society of Friends, who, with his wife Emma Brown Malone (born January 30, 1859, in Pickering, Ontario; died May 10, 1924, in Cleveland, Ohio), had founded the Christian Workers’ Training School for Bible Study and Practical Methods of Work in Cleveland, Ohio in 1892.

Despite her precarious health and opposition from some of her siblings, in the fall of 1892 Norris enrolled a few weeks late in the first academic class at Malone's school, also known as Friends' Bible Institute and Training School (and now as Malone University). Among her classmates was Mary Emily Soule (born August 12, 1869, in Dunham, Quebec, Canada; died June 26, 1943, in Vicksburg, Michigan), a fellow Canadian Quaker, who with her husband Edgar Ellyson, also became prominent leaders in the Church of the Nazarene. Shortly after joining Cleveland's Friends, Norris became "seriously ill with cancer. She was anointed and prayed for by J. Walter and Emma B. Malone, and it pleased the Lord to answer prayer and heal her." Believing that God had healed her of cancer, Norris began preaching in revivals.

== Early ministry ==
In 1893, Norris became pastor of a church in Vermont where she had previously held revival meetings. Another pastorate followed in Vermont. Norris was listed as a "recorded" (or official) minister in the Friends Church.

=== Evangelistic ministry ===
In 1895, at the urging of one of the leading New York Quakers, Norris returned to evangelism. At a camp meeting in the Methodist Episcopal Church in Clintondale, New York, Norris claimed to be entirely sanctified. Norris had sought the experience of entire sanctification and had previously claimed it by faith several times, and had preached often on the doctrine, but was still unsatisfied in her experience. Norris desired "to be sanctified wholly, cleansed from inherited sin, the old man cast out, the carnal nature destroyed, and to be baptized with the Holy Ghost and fire." After, what she later described as a "battle with the enemy", at the conclusion of the service Norris responded to the altar call and claimed the experience despite an absence of emotion.

At the camp meeting where she was sanctified entirely, Norris met Abram Fitkin, a Quaker evangelist. For the next six months Norris was teamed with Abram, pursuing an itinerant ministry in New York state; Norris borrowed books on holiness from Abram, and the pair were able to convert many to their church through their ministry – all the while finding themselves falling in love.

On May 14, 1896, Susan Norris and Abram E. Fitkin were married by Quaker minister William Thomas Willis, at his home in Clintondale. After their wedding, the Fitkins continued to hold revival meetings throughout the Northeastern United States, where "hundreds were converted and many led into the experience of full salvation". A month after their marriage, their revival campaign led to a group of converts organizing the Clintondale Pentecostal Church, with future Nazarene General Superintendent Rev. Hiram F. Reynolds, then a Methodist minister, deciding to join at that time.

=== Pastoral ministry ===
In October 1896, the Fitkins rented a former blacksmith shop in Hopewell Junction, New York, where they conducted their services, with the result that "scores were converted"; in November, sixty of the converts were organized into a church, with the Fitkins agreeing to be the pastors. At Abram Fitkin's recommendation, the church affiliated with the newly established Association of Pentecostal Churches of America (APCA), a holiness denomination led at that time by William Howard Hoople. Soon after, the Fitkins started another church in Cornwall, New York, which they also pastored. In 1898 Abram Fitkin was ordained as a minister in the APCA at Brooklyn.

By 1900, the Fitkins were co-pastors of the APCA church in South Manchester, Connecticut, where they lived in a rented house on Main Street. On April 12, 1900, Susan Fitkin was elected president of the APCA's Women's Foreign Missionary Auxiliary at its second annual meeting, held in Saratoga Springs, New York. During the last four months of 1900, the Fitkins devoted their efforts to traveling evangelism.

As a consequence of the ongoing depressed economic circumstances caused by the Panic of 1893, Abram struggled financially while serving as a pastor and evangelist, with little financial support possible from the church. It was noted that these "were times when the food on the parsonage table had literally been prayed in by Abram and Susan", who could turn a soup bone into a week of meals. During 1903, Abram left pastoral ministry and ceased his evangelistic work to devote his attention to making sufficient income to support both his family and the couple's future ministry, believing that it was "better to be a good businessman than a poor minister." His aim was to make enough for he and Susan to be independent enough to pursue God's work, setting a goal of $500,000 (equivalent to $17.9 million in 2025).

By 1904, the Fitkins had moved to Everett, Massachusetts, where Susan became the pastor of the APCA church. During their time in Massachusetts, Susan had their first two children: Raleigh (b. 1904) and Mary-Louise (b. 1907). The year Mary-Louise was born, the APCA merged with the Church of the Nazarene, which had been founded in California in October 1895 by Phineas Bresee and Joseph Widney, to form the Pentecostal Church of the Nazarene (simplified to Church of the Nazarene in 1919), automatically making the Fitkins a founding family of the new denomination.

By the end of 1907, the Fitkins and their two children had moved to Brooklyn, New York, where Abram could pursue increased business activities. There, they became members of the John Wesley Pentecostal Church of the Nazarene, located at the corner of Saratoga Avenue and Sumpter Street, Brooklyn, pastored by William Howard Hoople. Their third child, Willis Carradine, named in honor of evangelist Beverly Carradine, was born in 1908.

In 1909, and despite both still being in their 30s, Bresee ordained Susie Fitkin and her husband as elders of the Pentecostal Church of the Nazarene. Susan appreciated the importance of the ceremony, but felt that it only confirmed the path that God had placed her on years earlier, as "He had definitely spoken these precious words to my heart, 'Ye have not chosen me, but I have chosen you, and ordained you, that ye should go and bring forth fruit.'"

By April 1910, the Fitkins lived in their own home on Wallis Avenue, in Queens, and in 1912 they had their fourth (and last) child, Ralph MacFarland.

After a fishing trip with his father in August 1914, nine-year-old Raleigh was thrown from their car after its axle broke. Though he seemed uninjured, by the next day Raleigh was suffering debilitating abdominal pain. Despite an operation in a home in Allenhurst, New Jersey, and the efforts of six physicians, Raleigh died on September 14, less than two weeks after his 10th birthday. Raleigh, inspired by his parents' strong belief in the religious work they were doing, had testified to becoming a Christian at age 6, and had indicated that he wanted to be a missionary in Africa.

== Missions, ministry, philanthropy and family life ==
The 1914 death of their first born child, 10-year-old Raleigh, was the primary factor in the missionary and philanthropic enterprises of the Fitkins. According to Basil Miller: "The lad Raleigh was to play an important role in the family's missionary future. ... [T]he boy's interest in missions prompted his father Abram to build at a cost of thousands of dollars the Raleigh Fitkin Memorial Hospital in Africa". Abram Fitkin's ability to make money financed his wife's ministry,

into which her husband's generosity in the span of his life poured a fortune. For during the days of her active service, she was to cover the foreign world more extensively than any church sire or leader among the Nazarenes. All of this was made possible by Abram's midas' touch. Traveling more than a half-million missionary miles, she did so without cost to the church she loved so deeply. Likewise she contributed through Mr. Fitkin's successes the expenses of her companion on home and foreign trips, as well as making liberal missionary donations. In the dim backdrop of this was Raleigh, whose missionary zeal and interest so touched his father's heartstrings that he could but be generous with God's work and philanthropic causes.

In partnership with General Superintendent and Foreign Missions Secretary Hiram F. Reynolds, Susan Fitkin dedicated her energies to promoting the missionary program of the Church of the Nazarene in her capacity as the unpaid founding president of the Nazarene Women's Missionary Society for almost 33 years from September 30, 1915. Referring to Abram's role, Basil Miller indicates: "Throughout the years of Mrs. Fitkin's missionary travels as president of the W.F.M.S., he financed liberally all her expenses as well as those of her companions en route. In addition there were large gifts directly to missionary causes, these amounts going far over the ten thousand mark in some years".

=== Raleigh Fitkin Memorial Church of the Nazarene, Swaziland (1916) ===
Early in 1916 Susan Fitkin began dreaming of building a missionary chapel in Africa in memory of Raleigh. Abram Fitkin provided the funds to construct the Raleigh Fitkin Memorial church, "the first tangible memorial to that would-be child missionary, Raleigh", at Piggs Peak, Swaziland.

=== Raleigh Fitkin Memorial Hospital, Piggs Peak, Swaziland (1919-1925) ===
In October 1916 the Fitkins advised Hiram F. Reynolds, a general superintendent of the Church of the Nazarene and head of its foreign missionary program, that they would "provide the money for the erection of a memorial hospital in Africa." The Fitkins donated funds to build the Raleigh Fitkin Memorial Hospital, a small 18-bed facility built on the Nazarene mission compound at Piggs Peak, Swaziland, which opened in 1920. By 1919 the Nazarene mission station at Piggs Peak, formerly known as the Camp Station, was renamed the Fitkin Memorial Station. In 1925 the Swaziland government granted 35 acres of land fifty miles further south at Bremersdorp to the Church of the Nazarene for a hospital closer to the population centre of the country. After the opening of the new Raleigh Fitkin Memorial Hospital in 1927, the old hospital building was used to house a portion of the Piggs Peak Nazarene Primary School.

By January 1920 the Fitkins resided at 271 Brooklyn Avenue, Brooklyn. However, by December 1926, the Fitkins and their family lived at 8 Remsen Street, Brooklyn.

=== Raleigh Fitkin Memorial Hospital, Bremersdorp, Swaziland (1927) ===
Excluding the $10,000 contributed by members of the Church of the Nazarene from 1926, the Fitkins and Mrs Ada E. Bresee were the principal donors of the substantial amount given to build the replacement 80-bed Raleigh Fitkin Memorial Hospital (RFMH) for the Church of the Nazarene in Bremersdorp, Swaziland. By June 1925 the first stage was dedicated, and on July 16, 1927, RFMH hospital was dedicated by Susan Norris Fitkin.

That same year, the Fitkins also paid off the $50,000 mortgage of the John Wesley Church of the Nazarene, where they held their church membership since 1907, and gave $14,000 for Nazarene missions.

By June 1927, the Fitkins lived at a large estate, called "Milestones", that overlooked the Atlantic Ocean at 16 and 18 Corlies Avenue (at the corner of Ocean Avenue), Allenhurst, New Jersey. After a trip to California, they relocated the original colonial house to the rear of the property, and had a 20-room, 3-story bungalow constructed in its place as the family residence. In June 1927, daughter Mary-Louise married Esley Foster Salsbury at "Milestones", in a ceremony conducted by her cousin, Rev. Chauncey David Norris. In October 1927, son Willis married Helen Shubert in Ocean Grove, New Jersey.

=== Raleigh Fitkin Memorial Institution, New Jersey (1927) ===
By July 1927 Abram Fitkin bought a 160-acre farm on the south side of the county road between Colt's Neck and Scobeyville, New Jersey for $26,000, which included an apple and peach orchards, crops, livestock, farm machinery, outbuildings and a century-old fifteen room house, which the Fitkins intended to have enlarged and remodeled in order to use as an orphanage. Later that year they donated $1,000,000 to build and endow the Raleigh Fitkin Memorial Institution, a hospital and home for crippled children on the state highway, between Eatontown and Freehold Borough, New Jersey. The plans included the purchase of 200 acres to establish a self-supporting farm to fund the institute.

=== Raleigh Fitkin Memorial Pavilion for Children, Connecticut (1928-1930) ===
In 1928, the Fitkins donated $1,000,000 to Yale University for the care and treatment of children in memory of their oldest son, Raleigh, with $500,000 for the study of children's diseases, and another $500,000 for the construction of a 125-bed hospital at the New Haven Hospital at 789 Howard Avenue in New Haven, Connecticut.

Escalating construction costs resulted in the Fitkins donating an additional $100,000 in June 1929 to build the now larger six-story 136-bed Raleigh Fitkin Memorial Pavilion for Children. The donation allowed the expansion and consolidation of pediatric inpatient facilities in a single building. The Fitkins dedicated the hospital on February 8, 1930, with fifty beds on two floors assigned to pediatrics, special rooms for premature babies, and the Fitkins' donations also being used to facilitate pediatric outpatient and infectious isolation wards in nearby buildings. The Fitkin wards remained the inpatient pediatric service at the hospital until the 1980s.

Also in 1928, the Fitkins gave $1,000,000 to create the Ralph Fitkin Ward Unit in honor of their youngest child (then 16), for the "study and treatment of diseases of childhood".

=== Raleigh Fitkin-Paul Morgan Memorial Hospital, New Jersey (1930) ===
By May 1930, in order to further honor their deceased son, and in memory of A.E. Fitkin & Co. Vice-President Paul L. Morgan, who died of pneumonia at the age of 32, the Fitkins contributed $500,000 to the Spring Lake Hospital Society to build the Fitkin-Morgan Memorial Hospital at Corlies Avenue in Neptune Township, New Jersey. The hospital, which opened in November 1931. was founded as a non-profit, accessible to all "regardless of their ability to pay".

In 1966, the hospital's corporate name was changed to Jersey Shore University Medical Center - Fitkin Hospital.

== Later years and death ==
Susan Norris Fitkin died on October 18, 1951, aged 81, in Oakland, California. She is interred in Brooklyn, New York.

== Family ==
Abram and Susan Fitkin had four children.

=== Abram Raleigh Fitkin ===
Abram Raleigh Fitkin was born September 3, 1904, in Everett, Massachusetts, and died September 7, 1914.

=== Mary-Louise Hooper ===
Mary-Louise Fitkin Hooper was born June 12, 1907, in Swampscott, Massachusetts, and died in Klamath Falls, Oregon, on August 14, 1987. She attended Adelphi Academy in Brooklyn, and studied for a year at Stanford University until leaving in June 1928.

Mary Louise was married and divorced three times, between 1928 and 1949. She first married Esley Foster Salsbury on June 14, 1928, at "Milestones", the Fitkin home in Allenhurst, New Jersey. In April 1930 the Salsburys lived with Susan Norris Fitkin in Oakland, California. They had one child, Suzanne Mary Salsbury (born 1933), and they divorced sometime before August 1938.

By August 1938, Mary-Louise had married Dr. Karl Josef Deissler a German physician who had fled Germany for the US in 1931 because of his liberal ideas and fears of Nazi persecution. Deissler was excluded from the US western defense area from September 1942 until November 1943 as an enemy alien, During their period of separation, Mary-Louise and her daughter lived in Illinois. The Deisslers divorced in 1946, and Mary-Louise and Suzanne moved to Carmel, California.

In late 1947, Mary-Louise married Clifford Hooper, an African American whom she had met while campaigning for the NAACP; they married in Seattle, Washington, as the laws of California did not allow inter-racial marriages. After living in Vancouver, British Columbia, for a year, the Hoopers separated, and were divorced in 1949.

By June 1950, a year before her mother's death, Mary-Louise had become a Quaker. She returned to Stanford University in 1953 to complete her degree, graduating in June 1955. She was active in helping to improve inter-racial relations, and supported the efforts in Africa to end colonialism and apartheid. She migrated to South Africa in 1955, where she supported the African National Congress. She was arrested and ordered deported in 1957. Returning to the United States, she continued to be vocal and active in her opposition to apartheid, organizing boycotts of South African goods, and invited Martin Luther King Jr. to speak at a 1965 South Africa Benefit, where he called for economic sanctions against South Africa.

=== Willis Carradine Fitkin ===
Willis Carradine "Bud" Fitkin was born October 10, 1908, in Hollis, New York, and died November 8, 1980, in Meredith, New Hampshire. He attended Adelphi Academy in Brooklyn. He married Helen E. Shubert, on October 22, 1927, in Ocean Grove, New Jersey. They had four children: Abraham Edward (born 1929), Willis C. III (born about 1931), Joyce (Pietri) (born about 1933), and Karen E. (Draper).

Fitkin was a vice-president, director and stockholder in A.E. Fitkin & Co. and A.E. Fitkin & Sons from 1932; president and chairman of Michigan Gas Utilities Co from April 1953; a member of the board of directors of Tampa Electric Co. until 1979; and was a member of the board of trustees of the Fitkin Memorial Hospital in Neptune, New Jersey, from its opening in November 1931.

=== Ralph MacFarland Fitkin ===
Ralph MacFarland Fitkin (March 7, 1912 - July 16, 1962), attended Adelphi Academy in Brooklyn until 1930, attended Yale University in 1931–1932, married Lorene Billie Hastings on February 13, 1932, in Elkton, Maryland. The couple had three sons: Reed Keawaiki (born 1939), Thomas Hastings (born 1943), and Scott Norris (born 1945). Ralph was a vice-president, director and stockholder in A.E. Fitkin & Co. and A.E. Fitkin & Sons from 1932; served as a lieutenant in the US Navy during World War II, working in the cable censor's office in Hawaii, before retiring from the US Navy as a lieutenant commander; and was the owner of KHON in Honolulu, Hawaii, from its founding in 1946 until at least 1952.

== Legacy ==
The Fitkin Memorial Church of the Nazarene (recently Fitkin's Memorial Church of the Nazarene), established at 1110 38th Avenue, Meridian, Mississippi, by January 1948, was one of the oldest African-American congregations in the Church of the Nazarene.

Upon the occasion of her retirement in June 1948 after almost 33 years as its unpaid general president, the Nazarene Women's Foreign Missionary Society decided to honor her by raising $50,000 to establish the Fitkin Memorial Training School on the new Nazarene mission field in Ji'an, Jiangxi, China. Eventually almost $75,000 was raised by members of the Church of the Nazarene for this project. The Fitkin Memorial Bible School was opened on October 12, 1948, with 26 students.

However, after the departure of Nazarene missionaries from China in May 1949, the balance of funds given for the Fitkin Memorial School in Daming were reallocated to educational projects in other countries, including $9,000 sent to British Honduras, where the Fitkin Memorial Nazarene Bible College of British Honduras was opened in Benque Viejo del Carmen on June 8, 1950, but closed in 1965; Japan, where $25,000 was allocated to construct the building that housed the new Nippon Nazarene Seminary in Tokyo, which was christened the Susan N. Fitkin Memorial Building, and dedicated on April 13, 1952; and $9,000 to the Philippines, where it was used to fund the construction of the Fitkin Memorial Bible Training School (later Luzon Nazarene Bible College and now Philippine Nazarene College) in La Trinidad, Benguet in July 1952, with an initial enrolment of 35 students, which was named in honor of Susan Norris Fitkin, who had died in 1951; and Lebanon, where land was purchased in the suburb of Sioufi, in the Achrafieh district of east Beirut, and a five-story building constructed in 1953 that housed a church and the Fitkin Memorial Nazarene Bible School, which operated from October 1954 until 1969.

== Works ==
- 1927. A Trip to Africa. New York.
- 1928. A Brief History of the Woman's Missionary Society, Church of the Nazarene, 1915-1927. Kansas City, MO: Woman's Missionary Society.
- 1929. Under Tropical Skies. Kansas City, MO.: Nazarene Publishing House.
- 1929. Over in Old Mexico. Kansas City, MO.: Nazarene Publishing House.
- c. 1930. Grace Much More Abounding: A Story of the Triumphs of Redeeming Grace During Two Score Years in the Master's Service. Kansas City, MO: Nazarene Publishing House; Holiness Data Ministry, 1997.
- 1937. ________ and Emma B. Word. Nazarene Missions in the Orient. Kansas City, MO.: Nazarene Publishing House.
- 1940. Holiness and Missions.
- 1950. "Confirmed by Fifty Years of Experience". In The Second Work of Grace, 51–53. Ed. D.S. Corlett. Kansas City, MO: Nazarene.
