= Peter Brough =

English ventriloquist

- Peter Brough with his doll Archie Andrews
- Born: Peter Brough; 26 February 1916; London, UK
- Died: 3 June 1999 (aged 83); England
- Occupations: Actor, ventriloquist
- Spouse: Peggy Mary Franklin (m. 1940, dissolved)

Peter Royce Brough (26 February 1916 – 3 June 1999) was an English radio ventriloquist who became a well-known name to audiences in the 1950s. He is associated with his puppet Archie Andrews.

== Early life and career ==
Peter Royce Brough was born on 26 February 1916 in Ealing, west London. His father, Arthur, was a ventriloquist and a frequent performer on the variety stages around London. Brough senior gave up performing in the early 1920s and concentrated on a textile business. Peter left school at 15 and worked for a Bayswater department store called Whiteleys, first as an errand boy and later as a counter salesman. He emulated his father by developing his ventriloquist skills, which he continued to practise whilst working at Whiteleys. Early press reports show Brough entertaining the patients at Acton hospital on Christmas Day, 1935. He continued entertaining at clubs and at concerts in the Acton area and by 1939 he was becoming a regular on the variety stage. His stage performances increased and in 1941 he was described as “England's Most Successful Young Ventriloquist”. He acted as a compere in the 1940 film Cavalcade of Variety featuring Billy Cotton and his band.

== Radio days ==
Brough began his radio career in 1944 in ventriloquism but in 1950 he debuted Archie, a mischievous child who domineered his mentor. Archie's chief characteristics were his Savile Row-tailored blazers and manic eyes. Archie followed in the tradition of the American ventriloquist Edgar Bergen and his dummy Charlie McCarthy.

His radio series based around the character – Educating Archie – featured in support the likes of Dick Emery, Freddie Sales, Benny Hill, Tony Hancock, Hattie Jacques, Bruce Forsyth, Harry Secombe, Max Bygraves, Beryl Reid and even a young Julie Andrews as the girlfriend of Archie; Eric Sykes was one of the series' main writers in the early 1950s. The show often averaged 15 million listeners, and a fan club had 250,000 members.

Brough published his autobiography Educating Archie in 1955.

== TV work ==
Because of the success of his radio show, Brough made his debut on television in 1956 in the BBC sitcom Here's Archie which co-starred Irene Handl and Ronald Chesney. The show was written by the latter and Ronald Wolfe, who would later team up on British sitcoms The Rag Trade and On the Buses.

Two years later, Brough was on ITV in Educating Archie, utilising the same team as before, although Marty Feldman took some of the writing credit as well. The TV appearances exposed his limitations as a ventriloquist, as his lips were frequently seen to move and resulted in his use of a cigar to mask such movements. In later years a critic remarked, "Ventriloquism on the radio - I could have done that."

By 1961, Brough decided to retire Archie following the death of his father, also a ventriloquist, and he then took over the family's textile and menswear business. His TV appearances were sporadic from then on. He died on 3 June 1999 and was buried in Maldon cemetery in Essex.

In November 2005, the original Archie Andrews doll was sold at auction in Taunton for £34,000.

== Personal life and death ==
Brough married twice. His first marriage was in 1940, to Peggy Franklin. The pair had a son and a daughter but the marriage ended in divorce. His second marriage was to Elizabeth Chantler, who died in 1994. The couple had one son and one daughter. In 1948 his sister, Edna Brough, married TV and film star Ernest Butcher, in Wood Green, London.

Brough's son, Chris Brough, became a record producer and married the singer, actress and TV presenter Ayshea Brough in the 1970s. His daughter, Romey Brough, is an internationally collected artist with work in the Tate Gallery Archive.

Brough died on 3 June 1999, aged 83 in Northwood, London.

== See also ==
- Archie's the Boy (radio programme)
