= Educating Archie =

British radio comedy show (1950–1960)

- Peter Brough and his doll Archie Andrews
- Genre: Comedy radio
- Country of origin: United Kingdom
- Language: English
- Home station: BBC Radio 4
- TV adaptations: Educating Archie (1958–1959)
- Starring: Peter Brough; Archie Andrews
- Original release: June 1950 – February 1960

Educating Archie is a BBC Light Programme comedy show which was broadcast for nearly ten years between June 1950 and February 1960, mostly at lunchtime on Sundays. The programme featured ventriloquist Peter Brough and his doll Archie Andrews. The show was very popular, despite its unlikely central premise of a ventriloquist act on radio. Educating Archie averaged 15 million listeners, and a fan club boasted 250,000 members. It was so successful that in 1950, after only four months on the air, it won the Daily Mail's Variety Award.

== Overview ==
The programme introduced comedians who later became well known, including Tony Hancock as Archie's tutor, who would greet Archie with a weary "Oh, it's you again" and always replied to any put-down from him with "flipping kids". Other "tutors" included Benny Hill, Harry Secombe, Dick Emery, Bernard Bresslaw, Hattie Jacques, and Bruce Forsyth – together with a young Julie Andrews as Archie's girlfriend. Later, Beryl Reid took this role, playing the St Trinian's School-esque Monica with such catchphrases as "jolly hockey sticks" and "as the art mistress said to the gardener". Reid also played young Brummie girl Marleen, whose catchphrase was "Good evening, each".

Max Bygraves later played Archie's tutor, with the catchphrases "I've arrived, and to prove it, I'm here" and "That's a good idea ... son!". The duo recorded two songs from the show on the His Master's Voice label: "The Dummy Song" and "Lovely Dollar Lolly".

Archie's the Boy was a spin-off series that aired from November 1954 to March 1955. The series ran for twenty half-hour episodes broadcast on the BBC Light Programme. It starred Peter Brough, Beryl Reid, Benny Hill, and Graham Stark.

== ITV sitcom adaptation ==
In 1958, Educating Archie was adapted as a television sitcom produced by the ITV company Associated-Rediffusion and broadcast under the same name. This version, which was broadcast in 1958–9, featured the ventriloquist's dummy Archie Andrews taking on a life of its own, talking and walking all over its creator Peter Brough, aided and abetted by a housekeeper played by Irene Handl, a non-paying lodger played by Freddie Sales (later Ray Barrett), and a jack-of-all-trades played by Dick Emery.
