= Leonard Insull =

Leonard Insull (1883–1974) was Britain's leading ventriloquial figure maker of the twentieth century.

Born in Wolverhampton, Insull trained as a joiner before entering showbusiness as a magician, "Hinsle, the Comedy Illusionist". He worked with his son, also Leonard, to construct ventriloquist's dummies until his son's death in 1957. His noted figures include Lord Charles for Ray Alan and Archie Andrews for Peter Brough.
