= Insull, Kentucky =

Unincorporated community in Kentucky, United States

- Unincorporated community
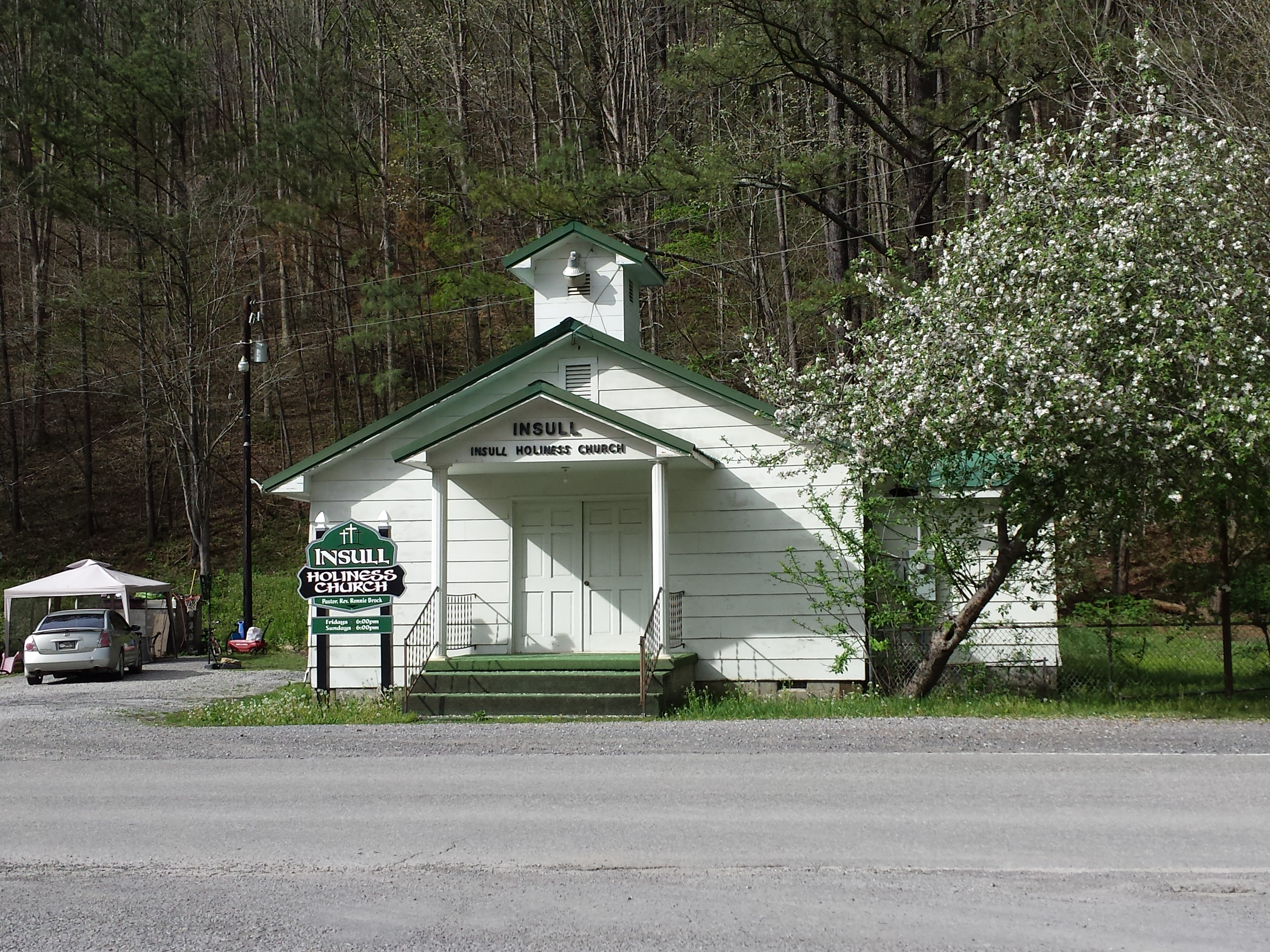
- Insull Holiness Church Holiness church in Insull

- Location within Kentucky Location within the United States
- Coordinates: 36°45′48″N 83°29′17″W
- Country: United States
- State: Kentucky
- County: Harlan
- Elevation: 1,171 ft (357 m)
- Time zone: UTC-5 (Eastern (EST))
  - Summer (DST): UTC-4 (EDT)
- GNIS ID: 494996

Insull is an unincorporated community and coal town in Harlan County, Kentucky. Its post office is closed. It was also known as Fee.
