= Edgar M. Levy =

Edgar M. Levy (1822–1906) was a Baptist minister who was influential in the 19th-century American holiness movement. Along with Rev. Absalom E. Earle, he was the foremost Baptist advocate for the experience of Christian Perfection or Entire Sanctification in 19th century America.

He was born in St. Mary's, Georgia, was educated in Philadelphia, and received an M.A. and D.D. from Bucknell University. He was a strong abolitionist and, as a result, was invited to open the 1856 Republican National Convention in prayer. A long-time pastor in the Philadelphia area, Levy was an important member of the National Holiness Association. His theological views aligned themselves more closely to Methodist and Wesleyan theology, making him unpopular among many of his fellow Baptists. Levy's testimony is recorded in John S. Inskip's Holiness Miscellany published in 1882. In it, Levy claims to have experienced complete freedom from all sin—a gift received by faith in Jesus Christ. Levy's obituary was published in The New York Times after his death on October 29, 1906.
