= Freddie Sales =

English comedian and actor (1920–1994)

Frederick Harry Sales (né Walker; 27 November 1920 – 15 November 1994) was an English comedian and actor.

== Life ==
Sales was born on 27 November 1920, in Kingston upon Hull, to a show business family, and took the surname Sales from that of his paternal grandmother. He began performing in theatres in his teens, and worked extensively in Ireland where he developed his act as a comedian. Part of his performance involved him acting as a baby in an oversized playpen, banging his "'poon". He toured internationally, entertaining the forces in the Second World War and visiting Australia and elsewhere.

Sales appeared regularly on radio shows such as Variety Bandbox and Workers' Playtime in the late 1940s and 1950s, and also visited the United States, performing as part of a revue in Las Vegas. In the late 1950s, he took a leading role in the television adaptation of Educating Archie.

Sales died in Epsom, on 15 November 1994, aged 73.
