= Archie Andrews (puppet) =

Ventriloquist's dummy used by Peter Brough

Peter Brough and his doll Archie Andrews

Archie Andrews was a ventriloquist's dummy used by English ventriloquist Peter Brough in radio and television shows in the UK in the 1950s and 1960s. Perhaps the most popular show in its radio format was called Educating Archie, regularly attracting over 15 million listeners. Archie was invariably dressed in a broad-striped blazer, and addressed the ventriloquist as "Brough". The television scripts were written by Marty Feldman and Ronald Chesney.

The radio show had a children's fan club that at one time had 250,000 members. Among future stars who appeared on the show were Tony Hancock, Dick Emery, Max Bygraves, Harry Secombe, Benny Hill, Beryl Reid and 14-year-old Julie Andrews. During this period Max Bygraves together with Archie Andrews/Peter Brough recorded "The Dummy Song" which is still available on Max Bygraves' compilation albums.

Archie went missing several times.

- In 1947, he was in Peter Brough's car when it was stolen from Lower Regent Street, London, but found two days later in a garden in Paddington.
- He was left in the rack of a railway carriage at Chatham, but a railway porter sent him back by taxi in time for his show.
- In 1951, Brough was travelling to Leeds to compere the televised Northern Music Hall at the Theatre Royal, Leeds, with Archie in his suitcase. Brough went for dinner in the dining car, and whilst away the carriage in which he had been sitting was taken off the train and went on to Bradford. Unable to locate the puppet, at the venue Brough went through a revised script without the dummy. A £1000 reward was offered and he was returned.

It is claimed that many Archies were made over the years and that two currently reside with puppet collector David Wilde. However, it is also claimed that only one Archie was made and that he was made in 1942. The mould from which he was made is believed to have been destroyed during the Blitz of World War II.

Archie was sold at auction in 2005 for £34,000.

== See also ==
- Leonard Insull, who made Archie. He was Britain's leading ventriloquial figure maker.
