= SS President Jefferson =

Three steamships of the American President Line were named President Jefferson.

- SS President Jefferson (1919), launched as Wenatchee 24 May 1919, in service 1921–41, USAT Henry T. Allen and USS Henry T. Allen, reserve fleet as President Jefferson 1946–48
- SS President Jefferson (1946), in service 1946–70
- SS President Jefferson (1973), in service until at least 1984
