= Insull Utilities Investment Inc. =

Insull Utilities Investment Inc. was a corporation securities firm based in Chicago, Illinois which became insolvent in 1932. It was formed in December 1928 with assets of $23,000,000 to $24,000,000. The firm was started by Samuel Insull, a former president of Chicago Edison, Commonwealth Edison, People's Gas Light & Coke Company, and Central Indiana Power Company. He was also chairman of the Corporation Securities Company of Chicago, which had a net worth of more than $80,000,000 on February 15, 1930. The latter business was created to acquire securities of Insull Utilities Investments and other Insull operating and holding companies.

Attorneys for Insull Utilities Investment's creditors filed a suit in a US district court in Danville, Illinois on September 22, 1932. The failure of the corporation is significant because it came during the Great Depression, and its founder was a leading businessman in Chicago. The 73-year-old financier planned another venture into public utility financing following the collapse of Insull Utilities Investment Inc.
