= Wake Forest University =

Private university in Winston-Salem, North Carolina, US

- Former names: Wake Forest Manual Labor Institute (1834–1839); Wake Forest College (1839–1967)
- Motto: Pro Humanitate (Latin)
- Motto in English: "For Humanity"
- Type: Private research university
- Established: February 3, 1834; 192 years ago
- Accreditation: SACS
- Religious affiliation: Nonsectarian; historically affiliated with the Baptist State Convention of North Carolina until 1986
- Academic affiliations: NAICU; ORAU
- Endowment: $2.15 billion (FY2025)
- President: Peter Rodriguez
- Provost: Nell Jessup Newton (Interim)
- Faculty: 6,667 (includes full- time faculty and staff)
- Students: 9,121 (fall 2023)
- Undergraduates: 5,471 (fall 2023)
- Postgraduates: 3,650 (fall 2023)
- Location: Winston-Salem, North Carolina, United States; 36.134°N 80.276°W
- Campus: 340 acres (140 ha); Midsize City
- Newspaper: Old Gold & Black
- Other campuses: Charlotte; Washington D.C.; Venice; Vienna; London
- Colors: Old gold and black
- Nickname: Demon Deacons
- Sporting affiliations: NCAA Division I FBS – ACC
- Mascot: The Demon Deacon
- Website: wfu.edu

Wake Forest University (Wake or WFU) is a private research university in Winston-Salem, North Carolina, United States. Founded by Baptist Christians in 1834, the institution received its name from its original location in Wake Forest, north of Raleigh, North Carolina. The Reynolda Campus, the university's main campus, has been located north of downtown Winston-Salem since the university moved there in 1956.

Wake Forest's undergraduate and graduate schools include the School of Business, School of Arts and Sciences, School of Professional Studies, School of Divinity, School of Law, and School of Medicine. The university is affiliated with Atrium Health Wake Forest Baptist and also maintains other academic campuses or facilities in Charlotte, North Carolina; Washington, D.C.; Venice; Vienna; and London. There are over 250 student clubs and organizations at the university, including fraternities and sororities, intramural sports, a student newspaper and a radio station. Wake Forest's undergraduate admissions is considered highly selective with an admission rate of 22%.

As of 2024, 18 Rhodes Scholars, including 13 since 1986, five Marshall Scholars, 18 Truman Scholars and 62 Fulbright recipients since 1993 have been affiliated with Wake Forest. Alumni of Wake Forest include ten college founders and presidents, seven U.S. governors, (Note: Charlie Crist attended two years before transferring.) members of the United States Congress, six U.S. federal officials, five U.S. diplomats, three billionaires, a Pulitzer Prize winner, Olympic athletes, and many U.S. district judges.

Wake Forest athletic teams are known as the Demon Deacons and compete in eighteen NCAA Division I intercollegiate sports. Those teams have won eleven NCAA team championships and the university is a founding member of the Atlantic Coast Conference (ACC).

== History ==
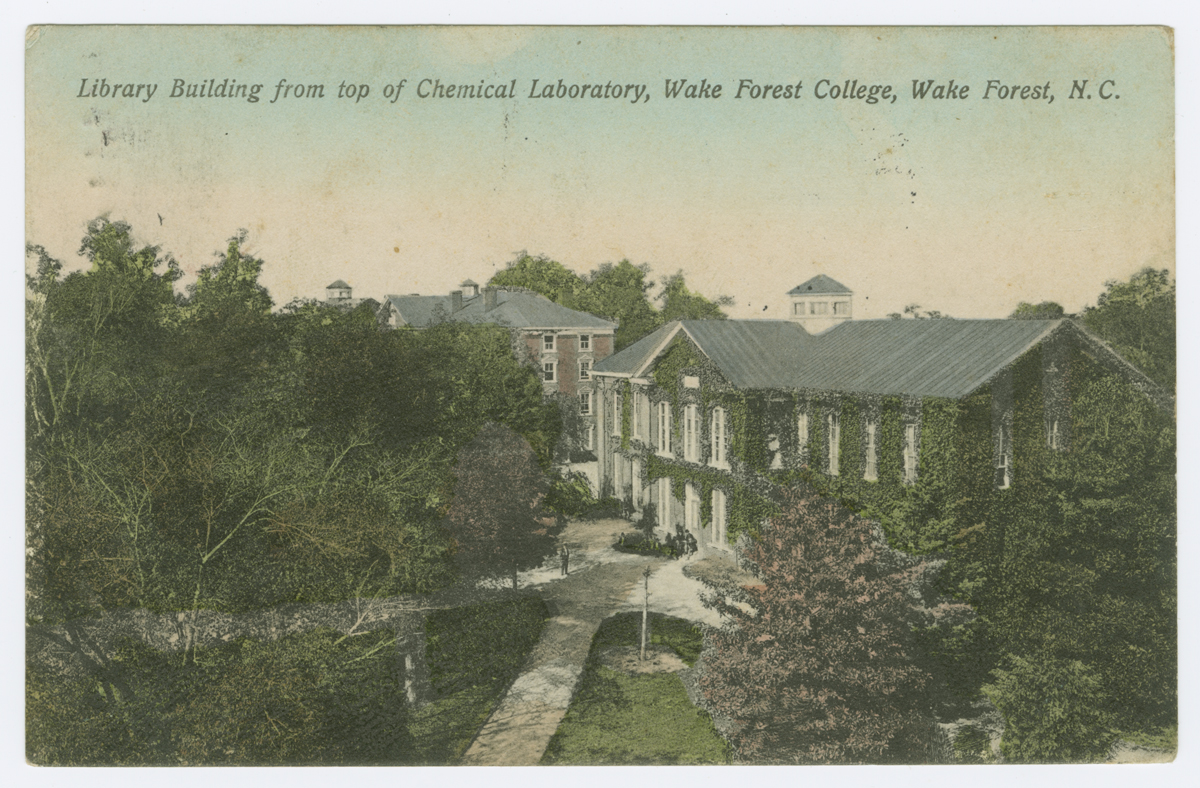
The original campus of Wake Forest College in Wake Forest, North Carolina

During the Baptist State Convention of 1833, at Cartledge Creek Baptist Church in Rockingham, North Carolina, establishment of Wake Forest Institute was ratified. The school was founded after the North Carolina Baptist State Convention purchased a 615-acre (249 ha) plantation from Calvin Jones in an area north of Raleigh (Wake County) called the "Forest of Wake". The new school, designed to teach both Baptist ministers and laymen, opened on February 3, 1834, as the Wake Forest Manual Labor Institute. Students and staff were required to spend half of each day doing manual labor on its plantation. Samuel Wait, a Baptist minister, was selected as the principal, later president, of the institute.

=== Wake Forest College ===
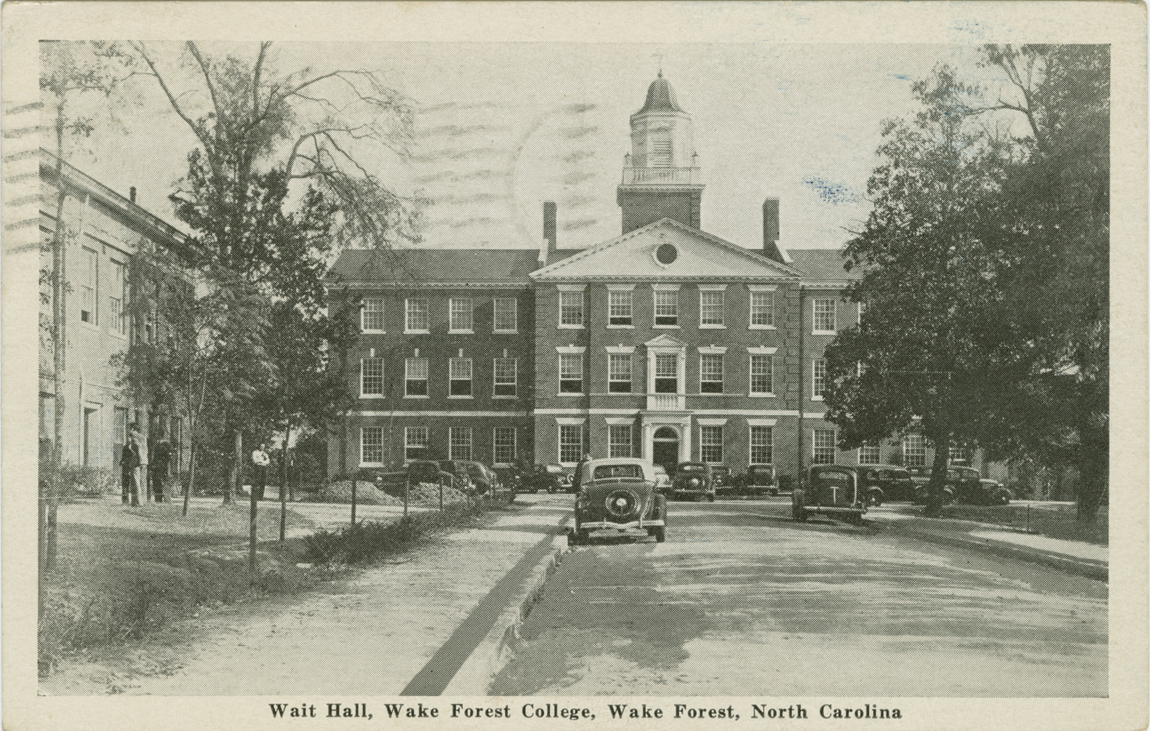
Wait Hall at the original Wake Forest campus in 1943

In 1838, the school was renamed Wake Forest College, and the manual-labor system was abandoned. The town that grew up around the college came to be called the town of Wake Forest. In 1862, during the American Civil War, the school closed due to the loss of most students and some faculty to service in the Confederate States Army. The college re-opened in 1866 and prospered over the next four decades under the leadership of presidents Washington Manly Wingate, Thomas H. Pritchard, and Charles Taylor. In 1894, the School of Law was established, followed by the School of Medicine in 1902. In 1911, Louise Heims Beck became the university's first librarian, later going on to become a vaudeville performer and the recipient of a Tony Award. The university held its first summer session in 1921. Lea Laboratory was built in 1887–1888, and was listed on the National Register of Historic Places in 1975.

The leading college figure in the early 20th century was William L. Poteat, a biologist and the first layman to be elected president in the college's history. "Dr. Billy" continued to promote growth, hired many outstanding professors, and expanded the science curriculum. He also stirred upheaval among North Carolina Baptists with his strong support of teaching the theory of evolution but eventually won formal support from the Baptist State Convention for academic freedom at the college.

=== Move to Winston-Salem ===
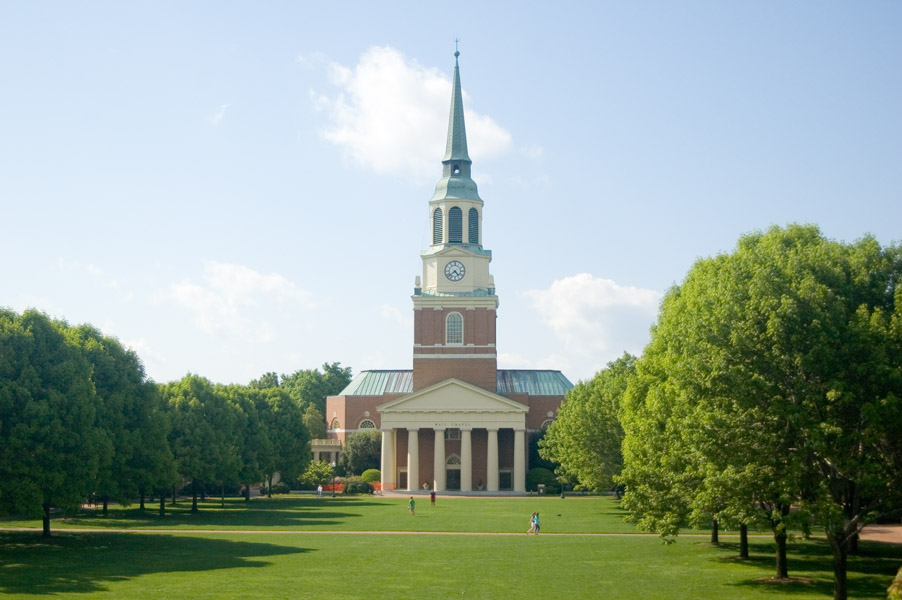
Wait Chapel overlooks the northwestern end of Hearn Plaza, also known as the Upper Quad.

The School of Medicine moved to Winston-Salem (then North Carolina's second-largest city) in 1941 under the supervision of Dean Coy Cornelius Carpenter, who guided the school through the transition from a two-year to a four-year program. The school then became the Bowman Gray School of Medicine. The following year, 1942, Wake Forest admitted its first female undergraduate students, after World War II dramatically depleted the pool of male students.

In 1946, as a result of large gifts from the Z. Smith Reynolds Foundation, the college moved to Winston-Salem for the beginning of the fall 1956 term. Charles and Mary Reynolds Babcock (daughter of R. J. Reynolds) donated to the college about 330 acres (1.3 km^{2}) of fields and woods at "Reynolda", their estate. A name change to Smith Reynolds University was considered, but dropped. From 1952 to 1956, fourteen new buildings were constructed on the new campus. These buildings were constructed in Georgian style. The old campus in Wake Forest was sold to the Baptist State Convention to establish the Southeastern Baptist Theological Seminary.

=== Desegregation ===
On April 27, 1962, Wake Forest's board of trustees voted to accept Edward Reynolds, a native of Ghana, as the first black full-time undergraduate at the school. This made Wake Forest the first major private university in the South to desegregate. Reynolds, a transfer student from Shaw University, became the first black graduate of the university in 1964, when he earned a bachelor's degree in history. He went on to earn master's degrees at Ohio University and Yale Divinity School, and a Ph.D. in African history from the University of London in 1972. He became a professor of history at the University of California, San Diego, and the author of several history books. Other diversity milestones:

- Japanese student Konsukie Akiyama became the first Asian graduate in 1909.
- The first women undergraduates were admitted in 1942.
- James G. Jones became the first American Indian graduate in 1958. He was from the Lumbee nation.
- On February 23, 1960, ten Wake Forest students joined eleven students from Winston-Salem State Teachers College (present-day Winston-Salem State University) for a sit-in at Woolworth's lunch counter in downtown Winston-Salem.
- Martin Luther King Jr. spoke in Wait Chapel on the Wake Forest campus on October 11, 1962.
- Herman Eure (biology) and Dolly McPherson (English) became the first black tenure-track professors in 1974.
- The Office of Minority Affairs was formed in 1978 and later became the Office of Multicultural Affairs. Wake Forest also added an Office of Diversity & Inclusion, an LGBTQ Center, and a Women's Center.
- In 1982, poet/actress/author Maya Angelou was hired as Reynolds Professor of American Studies.
- In 2002, Wake Forest added a cultural diversity requirement to its curriculum.
- Wake Forest appointed its first (part-time) Muslim chaplain in 2010. In 2011, the first associate chaplain for Jewish Life was named.

==== Recognition ====
Wake Forest's Associate Provost for Diversity and Inclusion Barbee Oakes was named one of the "25 Women Making a Difference" in 2012 by Diverse Issues in Higher Education, recognizing her for commitment to initiatives that promote pluralism and foster community. Wake Forest was among 40 schools across the country awarded the 2012 Higher Education Excellence in Diversity Award by Insight into Diversity magazine.

=== Recent history ===
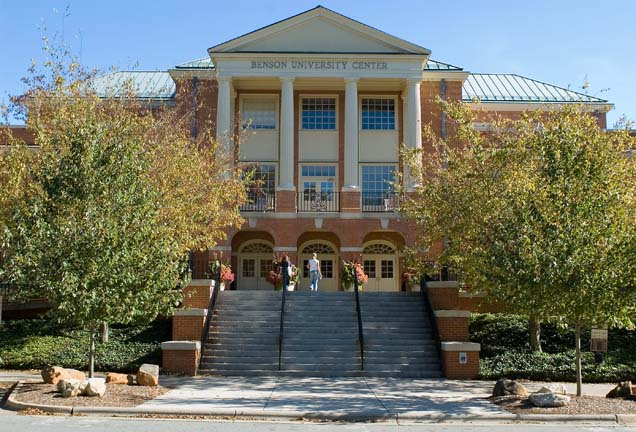
The Benson University Center at the current Reynolda campus was built in 1990.

A graduate studies program was inaugurated in 1961, and in 1967 the school became the fully accredited Wake Forest University. The Babcock Graduate School of Management, now known as the School of Business, was established in 1969. The James R. Scales Fine Arts Center opened in 1979.

In 1979, Wake Forest began a process to change its relationship with the Baptist State Convention of North Carolina, in order to obtain more academic freedom and choose non-Baptist trustees. In 1986, the school gained autonomy from the Baptist State Convention of North Carolina and established a fraternal relationship with it.

Middleton House and its surrounding 5 acres (2.0 ha) were deeded by gift to Wake Forest by Philip Hanes and his wife Charlotte in 1992. The donation was completed in 2011.

On September 16, 2015, Wake Forest announced plans to offer undergraduate classes downtown in Innovation Quarter in Winston-Salem. On March 18, 2016, the school announced programs in biomedical sciences and engineering at its new Wake Downtown campus, opening in January 2017. Wake Downtown is in a former R.J. Reynolds Tobacco Company plant, next to the second campus of the School of Medicine, which opened in July 2016.

In November 2016, Wake Forest was involved in a college football scandal known as WakeyLeaks, which involved leaking playbook information from the Wake Forest Demon Deacons football team.

On March 12, 2019, Wake Forest was one of eight colleges and universities involved in the Varsity Blues scandal. It was later revealed that former Wake Forest volleyball coach Bill Ferguson accepted a $50,000 bribe to help a future student be admitted into the university.

On February 21, 2020, Wake Forest officially apologized for the institution's role in benefiting from enslaved people during slavery.

Wake Forest Baptist Medical Center and Atrium Health announced a partnership in 2019 with the goal of a Charlotte, North Carolina, campus for the Wake Forest School of Medicine. More specific details were revealed in February 2021, including a seven-story tower, and on March 24, 2021, Atrium Health announced a 20-acre site at Baxter and McDowell Streets. Also, School of Medicine dean Dr. Julie Ann Freischlag said construction would start in 2022, with the first students attending in 2024. It officially opened 2025. Hatch, who was leaving as president June 30, said Wake Forest would have a School of Professional Studies at the Charlotte location in 2022.

=== Political activities ===
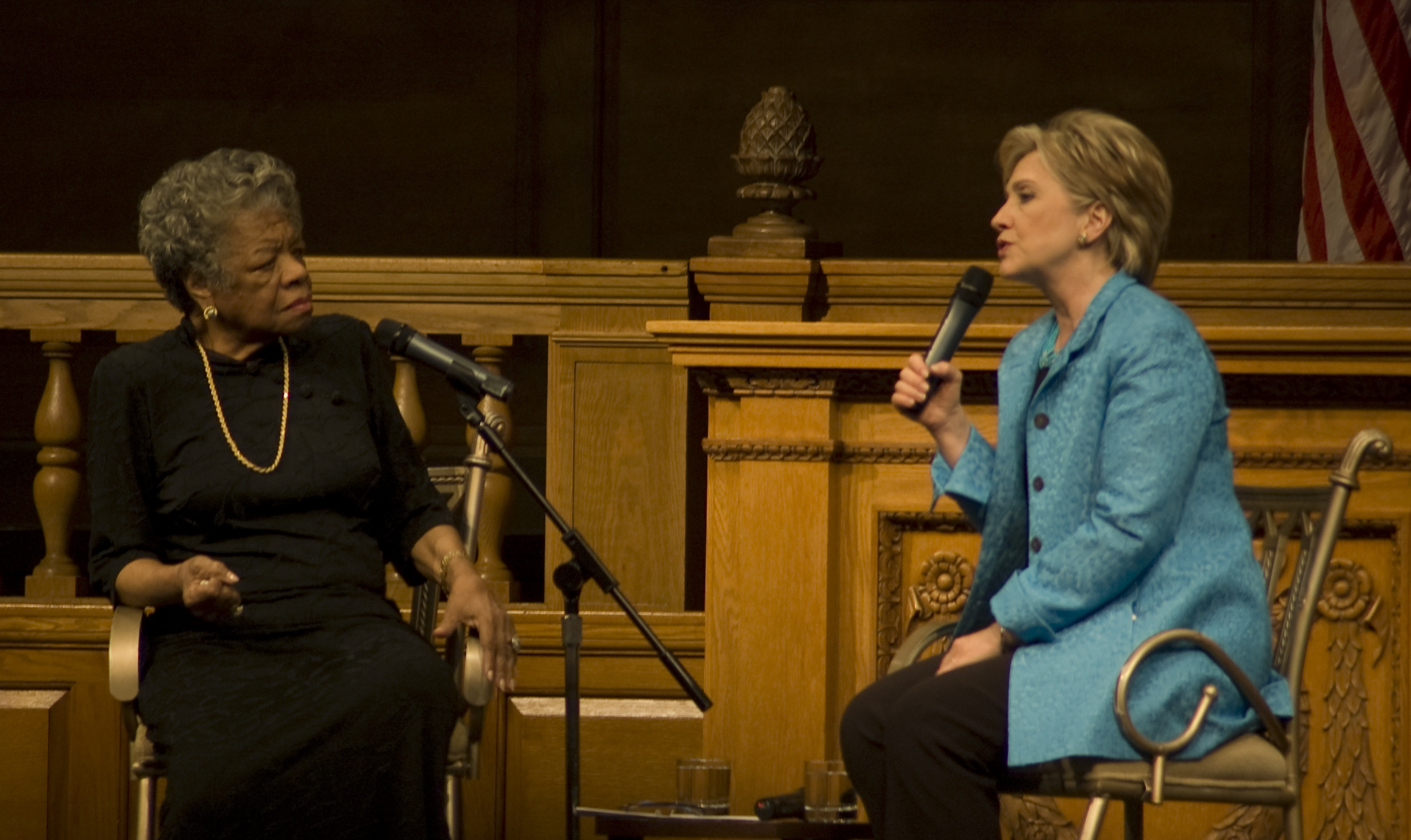
Hillary Clinton alongside Maya Angelou at a Wake Forest University speaking event in 2008

On March 17, 1978, president Jimmy Carter made a major National Security address in Wait Chapel. The school has hosted presidential debates on two occasions. The first was between then-Vice President George H. W. Bush and Governor Michael Dukakis on September 25, 1988. The second debate was between then-governor George W. Bush and vice-president Al Gore on October 11, 2000. Both debates were hosted in Wait Chapel. Bill Clinton campaigned at Wake Forest for his wife Hillary Clinton during her 2016 presidential campaign.

== Campuses ==
=== Reynolda campus ===
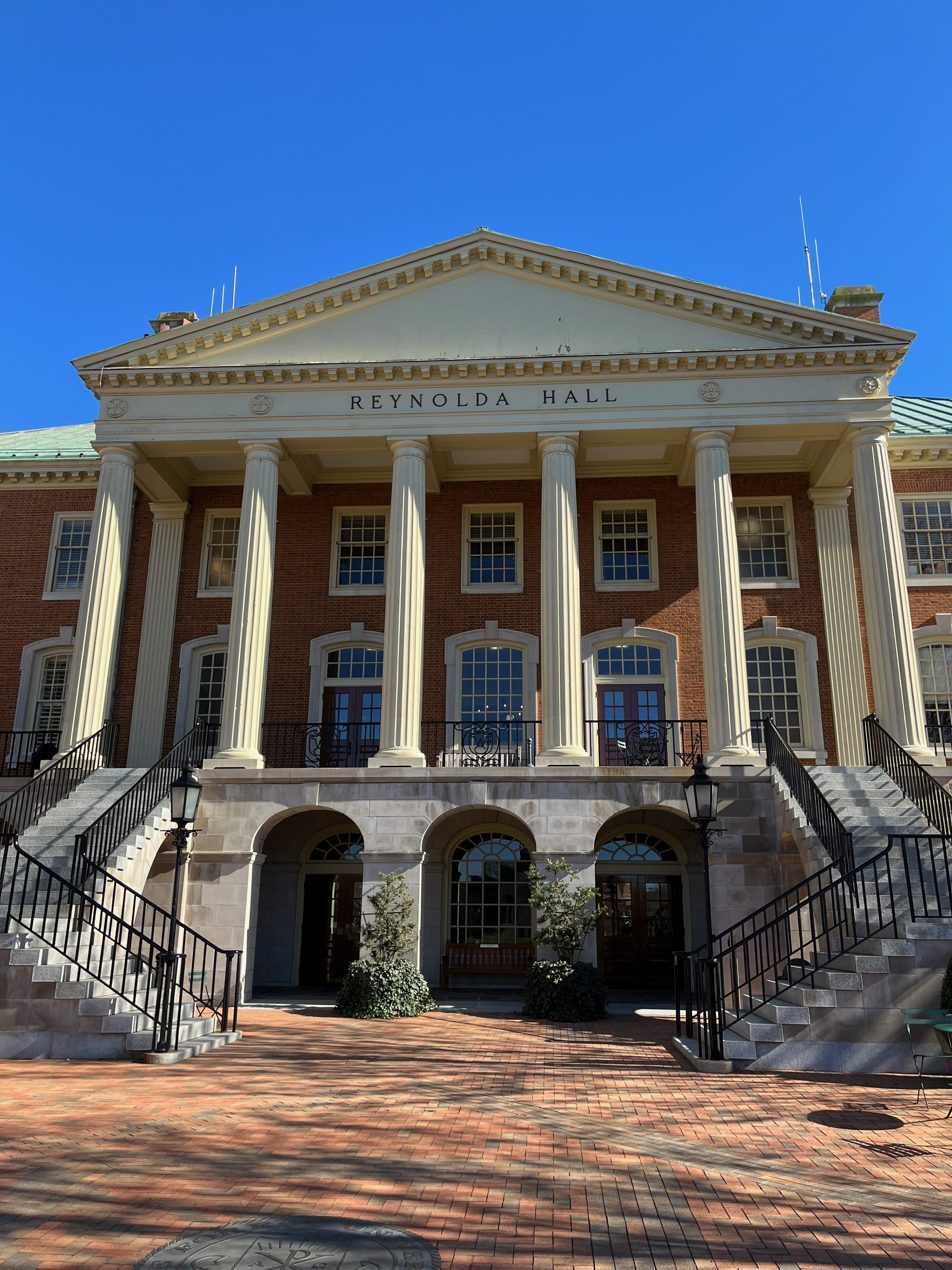
Reynolda Hall

The Reynolda Campus is the main campus for Wake Forest University, housing the undergraduate colleges, three of the four graduate schools, and half the Graduate School of Arts and Sciences. The core of Reynolda campus is the two interlinked quads, separated by the main administrative building and dining facility, Reynolda Hall, into North and South Campus. Known for its Georgian architecture, Wake Forest is constantly listed as one of the most beautiful campuses in North Carolina and the United States.

North Campus consists of Hearn Plaza, better known as "the quad", which holds six upperclassmen residential buildings, Subway restaurant, a book/office supply store, a clothing/athletic store, and Wait Chapel. The classrooms at Wait Chapel house the offices and classrooms for the Divinity School and the Religion Department.

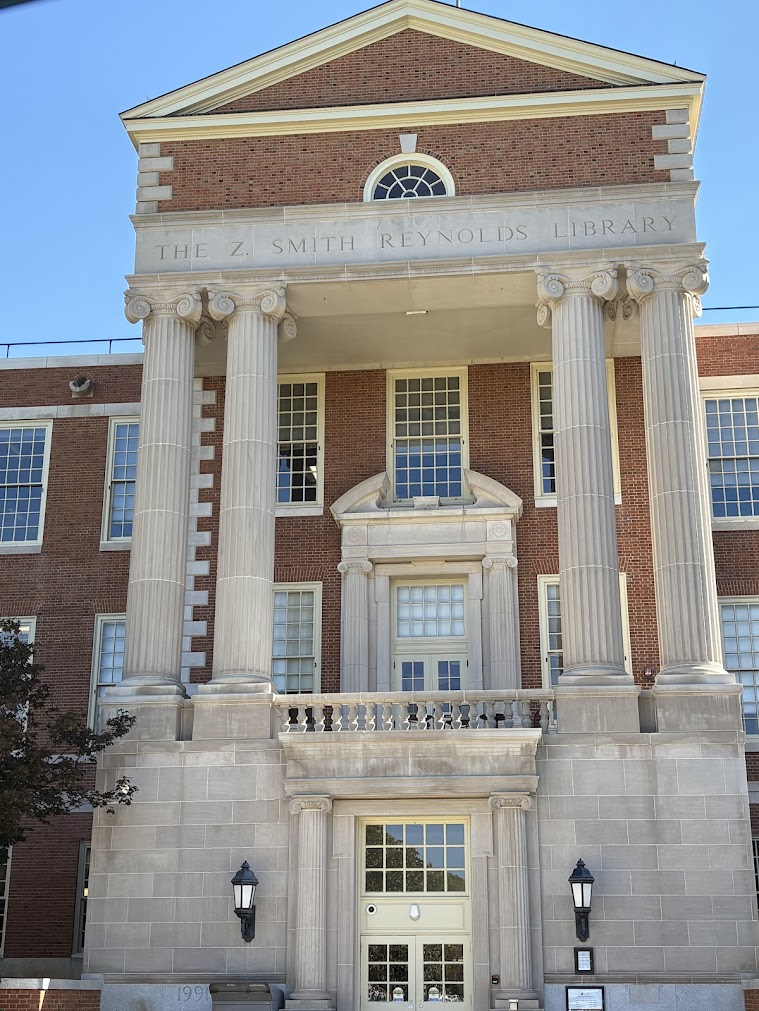
Z. Smith Reynolds Library

South Campus is the home of Manchester Quad, named for substantial donors Doug and Elizabeth Manchester. It holds freshman housing, most of the classroom buildings, the Benson Center, and the Z. Smith Reynolds Library.

==== Reynolda House Museum of American Art ====
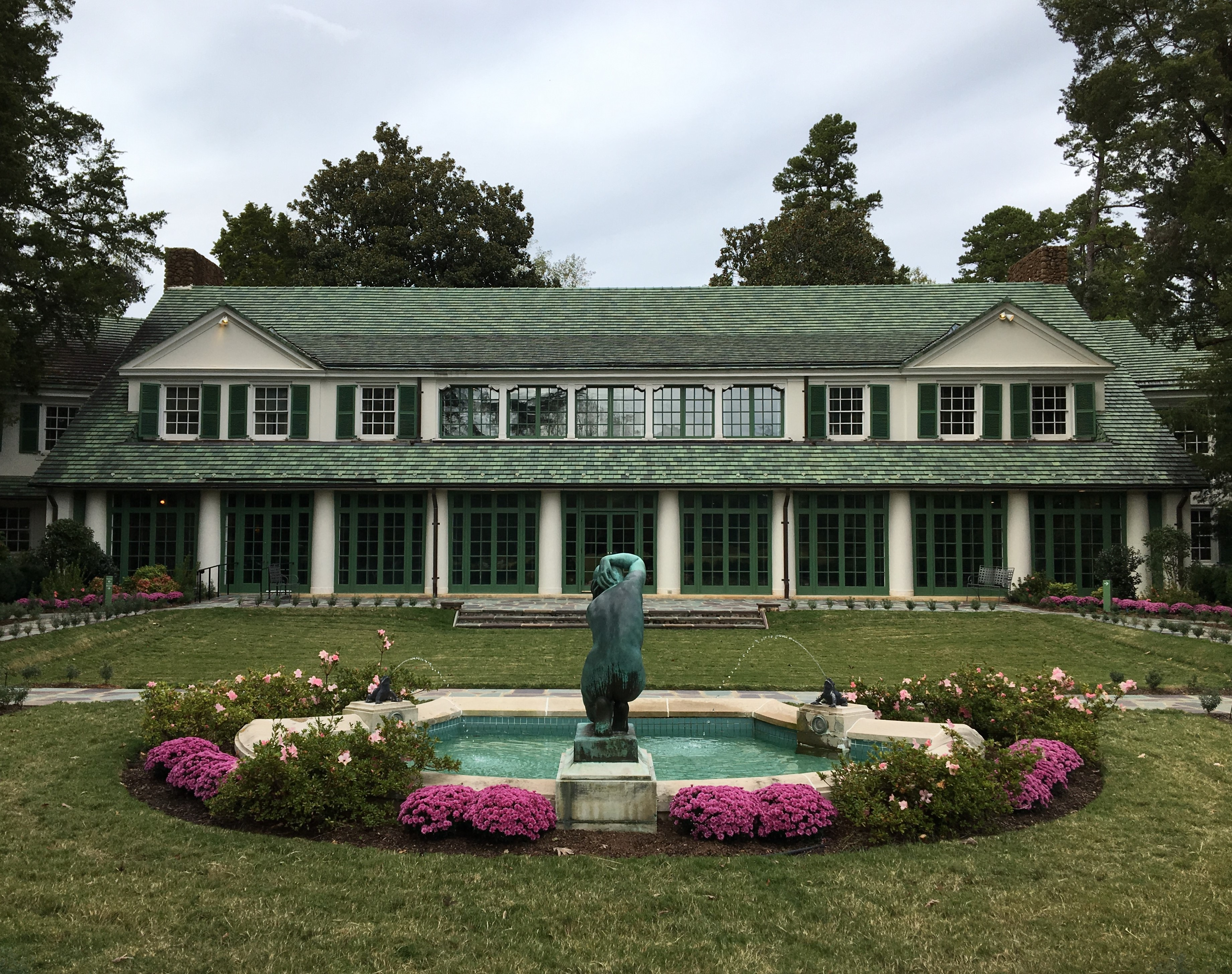
Front lawn of the Reynolda House Museum of American Art

Reynolda House Museum of American Art is the centerpiece of the Reynolda Estate, from which the university's Reynolda Campus takes its name. The residence was constructed in 1917 by Katharine Smith Reynolds and her husband, Richard Joshua Reynolds, founder of the R.J. Reynolds Tobacco Company. It was converted to an art museum in 1967 and has been affiliated with Wake Forest University since 2002.

Reynolda House displays American art ranging from the colonial period to the present, including well-known artists such as Mary Cassatt, Frederic Church, Jacob Lawrence, Georgia O'Keeffe, and Gilbert Stuart.

Wake Forest students regularly get involved at Reynolda House through internships, volunteer opportunities, and academic research. In 2010, Reynolda House and Wake Forest partnered on a first-year student orientation project that uses the museum's masterpiece by Frederic Church, The Andes of Ecuador, as the focal point of the summer academic experience. General admission to the museum is free to students and university employees.

==== Reynolda Gardens ====
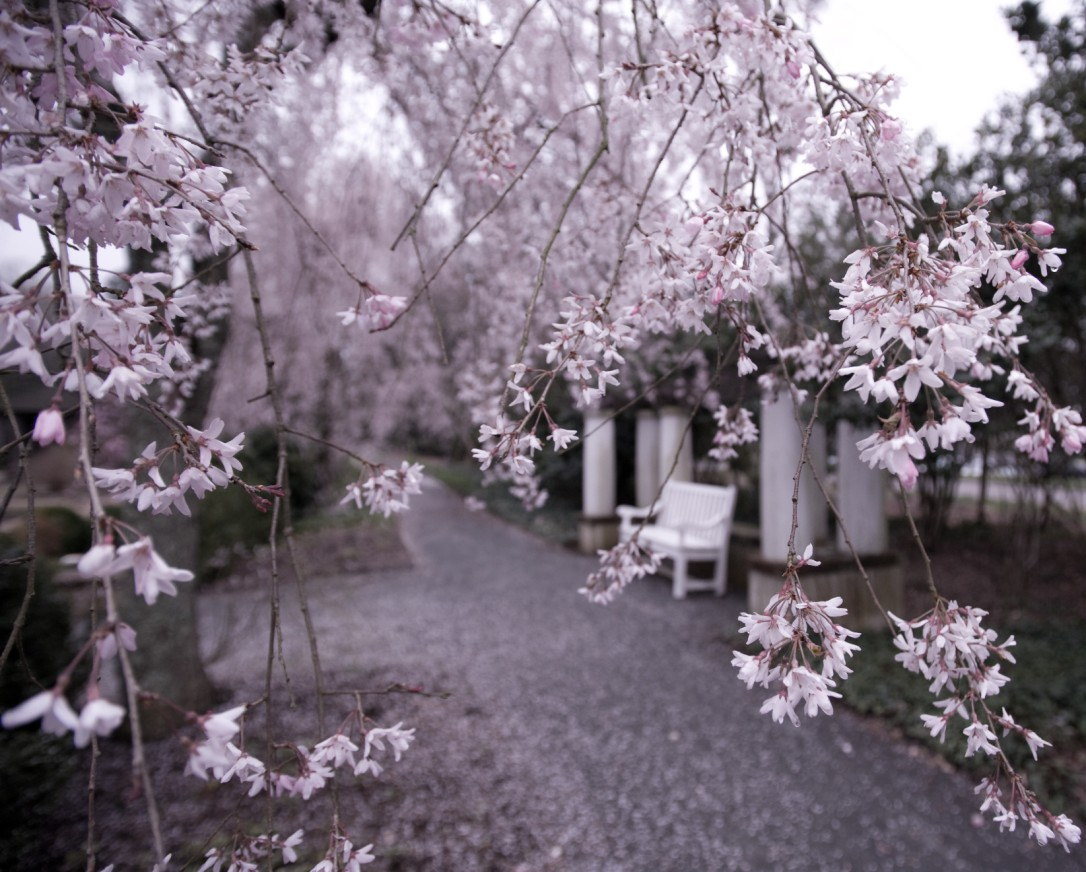
Reynolda Gardens

The 129-acre (52-hectare) property that constitutes Reynolda Gardens of Wake Forest University was once at the center of Reynolda, the early 20th-century estate of Mr. and Mrs. R. J. Reynolds, and included a lake, golf course, formal gardens, greenhouses, and woods. Although many changes have occurred to the landscape over the past century, this preserve serves as a learning center for topics related to horticulture, environmental sciences, and landscape history. Wake Forest students and faculty engage in research throughout the preserve. The public is invited to participate in a wide variety of learning experiences, including classes, workshops, summer camps, and special events.

==== Reynolda Village ====
Adjacent to the Wake Forest campus, Reynolda Village is home to stores, restaurants, services and offices. Now owned and operated by Wake Forest University, the buildings were originally part of the 1,067-acre (432-hectare) estate of the R. J. Reynolds family. These buildings were modeled after an English Village.

==== Graylyn International Conference Center ====
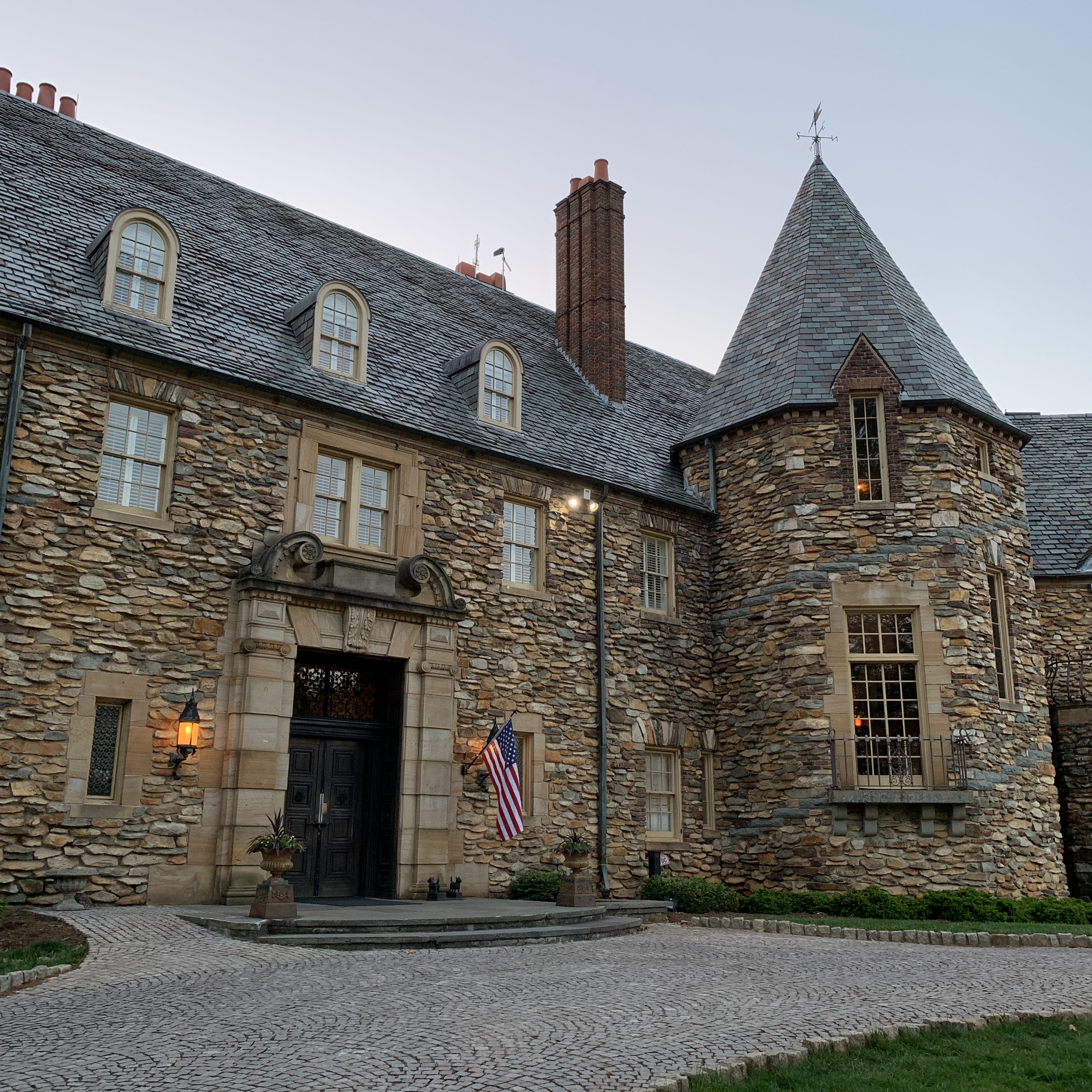
Graylyn Estate

Wake Forest University owns and manages one of the premier meeting destinations in the southeast. Graylyn was built as a private estate for Bowman Gray, Sr., and his family in 1932. The Gray family lived in the home until 1946 when it was donated to the Bowman Gray School of Medicine. In 1972, it was donated to Wake Forest University where it was used for many things over the years, including graduate student housing.

=== Other Winston-Salem campuses ===
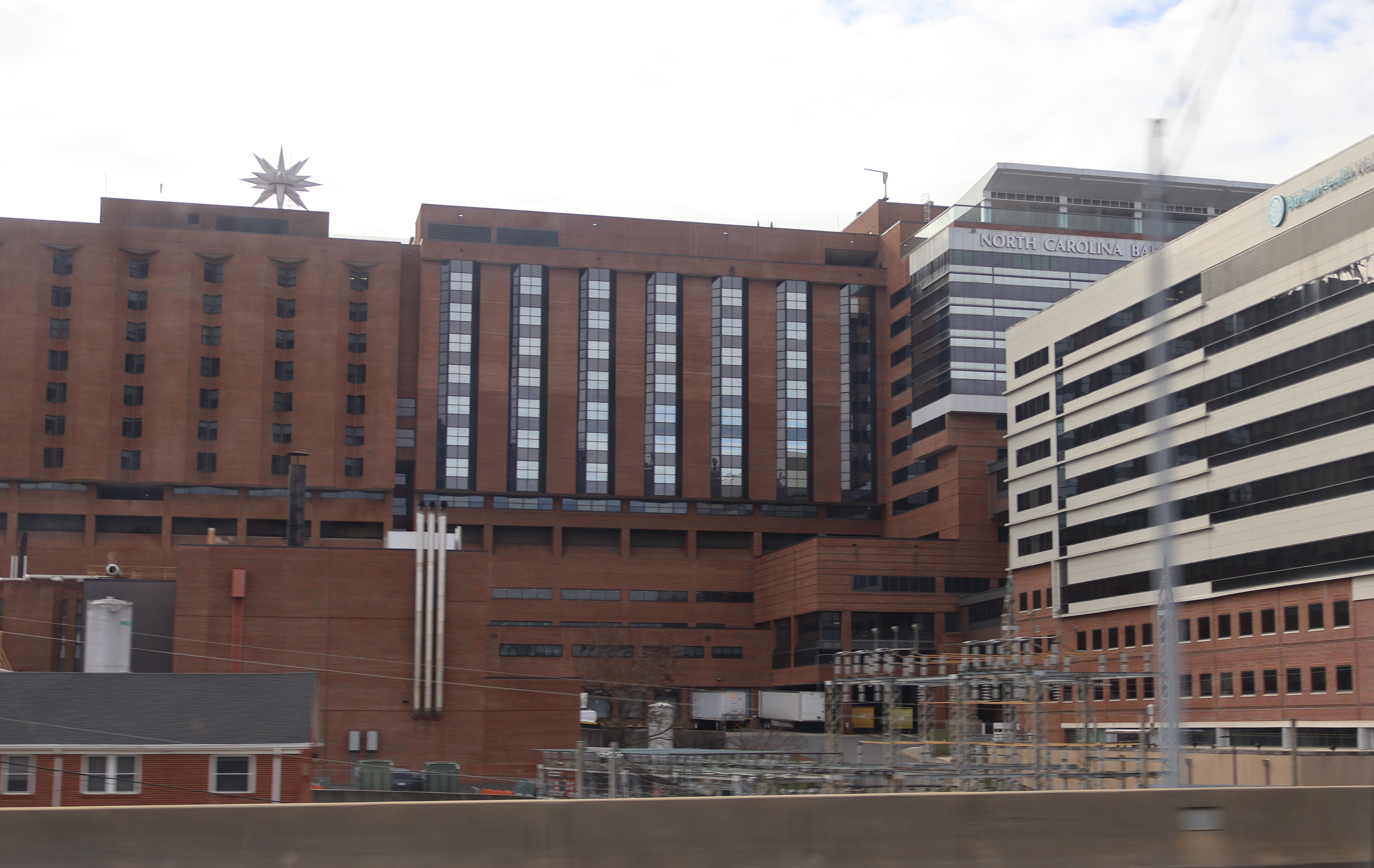
Atrium Health Wake Forest Baptist

Located in the Ardmore neighborhood near downtown Winston-Salem, the Bowman Gray Campus is home to Wake Forest School of Medicine, and its clinical enterprise, Atrium Health Wake Forest Baptist. With about 13,000 employees, the Medical Center is the largest employer in the Piedmont Triad Region, operating as an integrated health care system. Wake Downtown is located in the Wake Forest Innovation Quarter. The Graduate School of Arts & Science has some programs located in the Historic Brookstown in downtown Winston-Salem.

Wake Forest purchased the Lawrence Joel Veterans Memorial Coliseum and 33 surrounding acres from the City of Winston-Salem on August 1, 2013. The Coliseum, which seats 14,407, has been the home of Wake Forest's men's and women's basketball teams since it opened in 1989.

==== Wake Forest Innovation Quarter ====
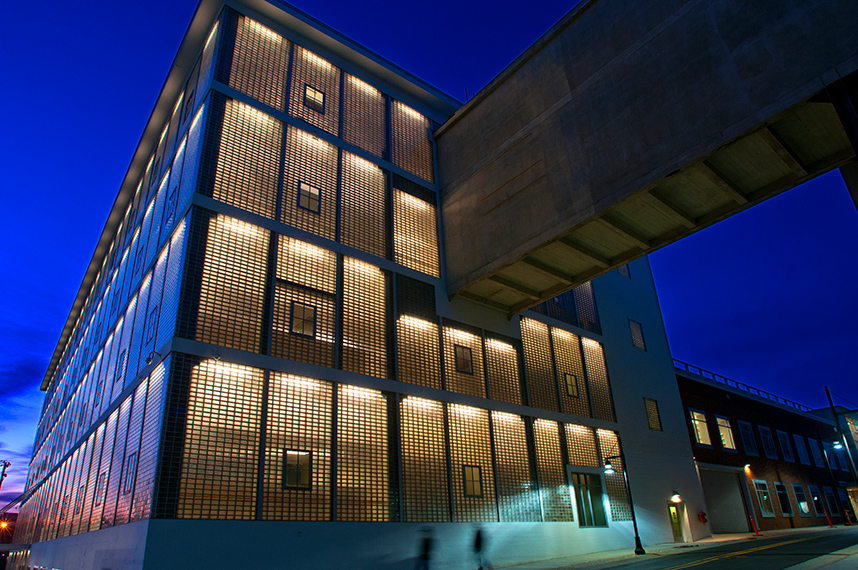
Innovation Quarter

The opening of Wake Forest Biotech Place in February 2012 marked a milestone in development of Wake Forest Innovation Quarter, based in downtown Winston-Salem and formerly known as Piedmont Triad Research Park. Operated by Wake Forest Baptist Medical Center, Wake Forest Biotech Place is a 242,000-square-foot (22,500 m^{2}) multipurpose biotechnology research and innovation center space that is the present-day home of several School of Medicine departments doing pioneering research, as well as private companies.

In December 2012 the Wake Forest Baptist Medical Center formally launched its new commercialization enterprise, Wake Forest Innovations. Located in the Innovation Quarter, Wake Forest Innovations brings together technology asset management functions with resources to support scholarship, invest in the innovative potential of its academic and clinical communities and help translate ideas and discoveries into commercial products and services for both the Medical Center and Wake Forest University.

In January 2017, undergraduate programs began at Wake Downtown.

==== University Corporate Center ====
Built as the world headquarters for Reynolds Tobacco Company, RJR Nabisco donated the more than 500,000-square-foot (46,000 m^{2}) building to Wake Forest University in 1987. Now known as the University Corporate Center, the building is located off Reynolds Boulevard, near campus, and houses the following University offices: Information Systems, Finance Systems, Procurement Services, and Financial and Accounting Services. Aon Consulting, BB&T, and Pepsi are also tenants.

=== Charlotte ===
The School of Business established a satellite campus in Charlotte, North Carolina, in 1995; in January 2001, it moved into a 30,000-square-foot (2,800 m^{2}), award-winning facility on North College Street in Uptown Charlotte.

The Charlotte Center offers two part-time MBA programs (Evening and Saturday), continuing legal education courses, continuing professional education courses, executive education, Lunch & Learn, and speaker events. Certificate programs offered at the Charlotte Center include business management for nonprofits, sustainability, financial planning and negotiations. The center also hosts corporate retreats and serves as an educational and gathering space for students and alumni in the greater Charlotte area.

The university began offering a small set of general summer school classes at the Charlotte campus in the summer of 2014.

=== Washington, D.C. ===
The university's Washington, D.C. campus offers undergraduate classes during the spring and fall as well as law classes during the spring and summer semester sessions. The Wake Washington Center also alumni workshops, networking events, volunteer meetings and speaker events and panels.

=== Overseas ===
The university owns international properties in Italy, Austria, England.

==== Venice ====
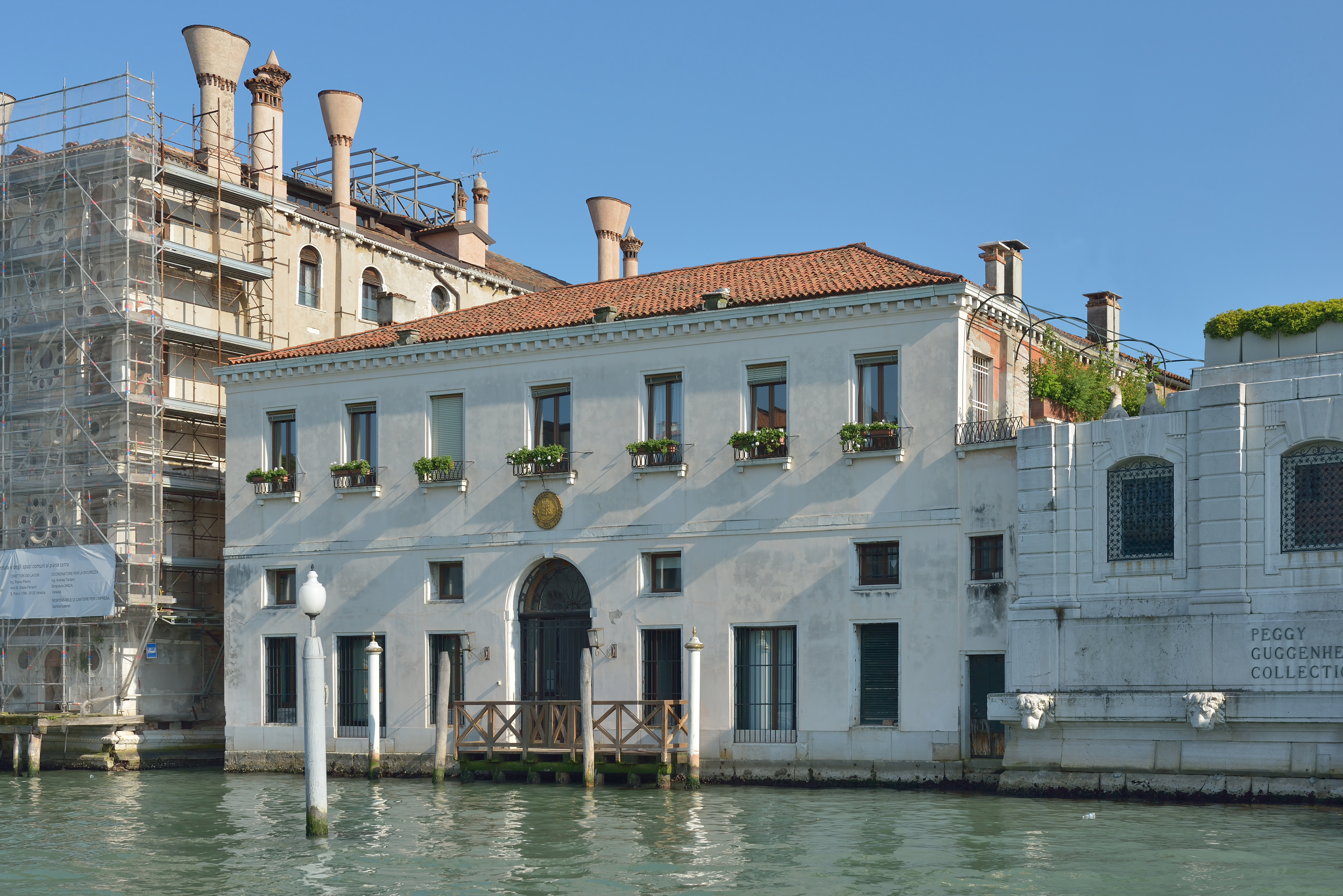
Casa Artom on the Canal Grande in Venice

In 1974, Wake Forest purchased the building that formerly housed the American Consulate in Venice and named it Casa Artom in honor of Camillo Artom, a professor at the Baptist Medical Center until 1969. Casa Artom is a two-story building facing the Grand Canal. It is flanked by the Palazzo Venier dei Leoni, which houses the Peggy Guggenheim art collection, and the 15th century home Ca'Dario. Each fall and spring semester, a group of Wake Forest students and a resident professor live and study together here.

==== Vienna ====
In 1998, Wake Forest purchased a three-story villa in Vienna. The acquisition was made possible through the donation of Vic and Roddy Flow of Winston-Salem, and the house was named in their honor. Built in 1898, the house was formerly the office of the U.S. Consulate. Each fall and spring semester, a group of Wake Forest students and a resident professor live and study together here.

==== London ====
In 1977, Wake Forest acquired a large, brick home in Hampstead for its London program. The house, a gift from Eugene and Ann Worrell, was named in their honor. Formerly known as Morven House, the building served as the home and studio of landscape painter Charles Edward Johnson. Each fall and spring semester, a group of Wake Forest undergraduate students and a resident professor live and study together here.

== Administration and organization ==
=== Graduate and professional schools ===
School	Year
Wake Forest School of Law	1894
Wake Forest School of Medicine	1902
Wake Forest University School of Business	1948
Wake Forest Graduate School of Arts and Sciences	1961
Wake Forest University School of Divinity	1999
Wake Forest University School of Professional Studies	2021

In addition to the Undergraduate College, Wake Forest University is home to the Graduate School of Arts and Sciences and five professional schools.

=== Leadership ===
The thirteenth president of Wake Forest was Nathan O. Hatch, former provost at the University of Notre Dame. Hatch was officially announced as president on October 20, 2005. He assumed office on July 1, 2005, succeeding Thomas K. Hearn Jr., who had retired after 22 years in office (and for whom the Upper Quad is now named). In 2020, Hatch announced his retirement as president. On January 29, 2021, the Wake Forest University Board of Trustees named Susan Rae Wente as Wake Forest's fourteenth and first female president. On October 1, 2025, it was announced that University President Wente would step down, effective June 2026. On May 20, 2026, the Wake Forest University Board of Trustees announced that Peter Rodriguez had been selected as the 15th president of Wake Forest University.

=== Faculty ===
Including the professional schools, the university has 1,996 faculty members, of whom 84.5 percent are full-time employees.

Ninety-three percent of undergraduate faculty have doctorates or other terminal degrees in their field. Wake Forest ranked tied for 10th best undergraduate teaching in the U.S. by U.S. News & World Report in its 2016 report, and the school maintains a faculty-to-student ratio of 1 to 11.

Notable faculty include:

- Anthony Atala, the director of the Wake Forest Institute for Regenerative Medicine, is considered a national pioneer in organ growth. His work was lauded as the No. 1 Science Story of the Year by Discover Magazine in 2007 and the fifth-biggest breakthrough in medicine for 2011 by Time.
- John A. Allison IV, distinguished professor in practice for Wake Forest University School of Business, former head of the Cato Institute and former chairman and CEO of BB&T
- David Carroll, professor of physics and director of the Center for Nanotechnology and Molecular Materials, is known for his research in nanoengineered cancer therapies, green technology, photovoltaics and lighting innovations.
- Melissa Harris-Perry, Presidential Endowed Professor of Politics and International Affairs, former host of the eponymous MSNBC current affairs and political commentary television program, current host of The Takeaway, and editor-at-large of ELLE.com
- Former President Nathan O. Hatch is a nationally known religious historian. His book, The Democratization of American Christianity, was named one of the "Five Best: Books on Religion in Politics" by The Wall Street Journal. He also served as the chair of the NCAA Division I Board.
- David Faber, professor of art and printmaking, is a nationally recognized printmaker whose works are housed permanently at five of the country's leading museums.
- Author and civil rights activist Maya Angelou, Reynolds Professor of American Studies, taught at the university from 1982 until her death in 2014. Among her many awards, she was honored with the Presidential Medal of Freedom in 2010.
- Psychologist Linda Nielsen, researcher on the effects of shared parenting and on father–daughter relationships

=== Campus police ===
The Wake Forest University Police Department (WFUPD) consists mostly of properly trained police officers, security officers, communication officers, and their support staff.

== Academics ==
=== Undergraduate admissions ===
Undergraduate admission statistics
	Fall 2025	Fall 2024	Fall 2023	Fall 2022	Fall 2021
First-time Freshmen
Applicants	19,600	18,727	17,479	16,857	15,156
Admits	4,068	4,058	3,768	3,602	3,816
Admit rate	21%	22%	22%	21%	25%
Enrolled	1,544	1,466	1,385	1,370	1,412
Yield rate	38%	36%	37%	38%	37%
Transfers
Applicants	464	421	338	295	258
Admits	173	151	101	85	49
Admit rate	37%	36%	30%	29%	19%
Enrolled	59	49	40	32	25
Yield rate	34%	32%	40%	38%	51%

Undergraduate admission to Wake Forest is deemed as "most selective" by U.S. News & World Report. For freshmen enrolling in the fall of 2023, the university received 17,479 applications and admitted 3,768, or 21.56 percent. 1,385 students enrolled, making the yield rate (percentage of accepted students who then enrolled) 36.75 percent. Approximately 55 percent of the class are women and 45 percent are men. Wake Forest University does not require applicants to submit a college entrance exam score; of the 26 percent of applicants who did submit SAT scores, the middle 50 percent for total scores were between 1410 and 1500. Of the 22 percent of applicants who did submit ACT scores, the middle 50 percent composite score was between 32 and 34. The median family income of Wake Forest University students is $221,500, with 71% of students coming from the top 20% highest-earning families.

Wake Forest has been consistently ranked as one of the most expensive institutions in the state of North Carolina, with its estimated cost of attendance 2025–26 academic year being $94,600, including $70,332 in tuition. On September 17, 2025, Wake Forest announced that it will offer tuition-free admissions for some low income North Carolina residents, starting in the fall of 2026.

==== Test-optional policy ====
In May 2008, Wake Forest made college entrance exams optional for undergraduate admissions, becoming the first national university ranked in the top 30 by the U.S. News & World Report to adopt a test-optional policy. Being test-optional means Wake Forest's admissions process does not require applicants to submit their SAT or ACT scores, and students can decide if they want their standardized test scores to be considered. Wake Forest University does not publish any explanation of how its admissions process compares applicants with submitted scores to those without.

=== Undergraduate curriculum ===
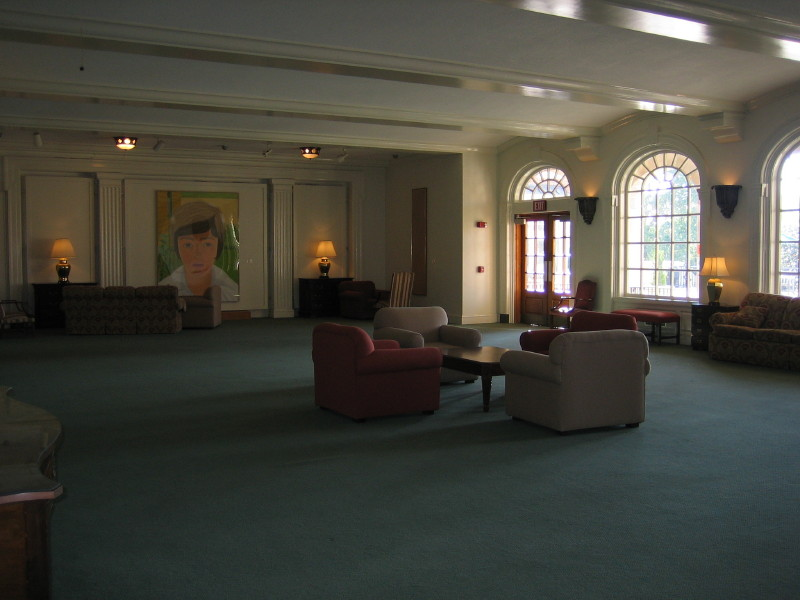
A formal lounge area used for studying inside Reynolda Hall overlooking the Magnolia Quad (formally known as Manchester Plaza)

Wake Forest offers 50 undergraduate majors and 60 interdisciplinary minors across various fields of study. Students initially declare a major the second semester of their sophomore year.

In order to graduate, a Wake Forest student must finish three requirements for 120 hours of credit: a core set of classes, a course of study related to a major, and electives. The core set of classes includes basic requirements (a first-year seminar, a writing seminar, health and PE classes, and foreign language literature) and divisional requirements (at least two classes in each of the humanities, social sciences and math/natural sciences and at least one in the fine arts and literatures).

Wake Forest also offers an "Open Curriculum" option, in which a small number of students, approved by a committee, may design a course of study with an adviser.

In order to attend the School of Business, students must make a special application to its program, which offers an accountancy program whereby a student earns a Bachelor of Science (B.S.) and an Master of Science (M.S.) in Accountancy and qualifies to sit for the CPA exam after five years of combined undergraduate and graduate study. The School of Business also offers undergraduate programs leading to degrees in business and enterprise management, finance and mathematical business.

Wake Forest supports a number of centers and institutes, which are designed to encourage interdisciplinary curriculum and programming. Currently, there is one provost-sponsored institute (Humanities) and eleven centers (including Nanotechnology and Molecular Materials; Enterprise Research and Education; Translational Science; Bioethics, Health and Society; BB&T Center for the Study of Capitalism; Energy, Environment and Sustainability; Molecular Communication and Signaling; and Interdisciplinary Performance and the Liberal Arts).

==== Study abroad programs ====
Wake Forest offers more than 400 semester-, summer- and year-long study abroad programs in 200 cities in more than 70 countries worldwide through Wake Forest-sponsored programs and through Affiliate programs (approved non-Wake Forest programs).

Wake Forest program options include:

- University-owned houses: Each semester or summer session, a resident professor leads a group of students to one of three University-owned study abroad houses and offers two courses in his or her respective disciplines. Resident professors are chosen from a wide variety of academic departments. The university houses are: Casa Artom in Venice, Italy; Flow House in Vienna, Austria; and Worrell House in London, England.
- Other University-sponsored semester study abroad programs take place in Santiago, Chile; Dijon, France; Cambridge, England; Salamanca, Spain; and Hirakata, Japan.

==== Pre-college immersion programs ====
Wake Forest University offers pre-college programs for high school students to explore various subjects and majors before college through the on-campus Summer Immersion and Online Immersion Programs. The Pre-College Department is part of the Wake Forest University Office of Professional and Career Development.

The Summer Immersion Program began in 2015, and the Online Immersion Program began in 2016. The Summer Immersion Program offers 23 institutes in the STEM, social sciences, and creative disciplines. The Online Immersion Program offers nine courses in the same disciplines. All courses are congruent with Wake Forest University offered majors. All institutes and courses are led by Wake Forest University faculty and staff members.

==== Graduate School of Arts and Sciences ====
The Graduate School of Arts and Sciences offers 25 programs of graduate-level study as well as 11 certificates. Degree programs include eleven areas of Ph.D. study in the sciences, as well as 30 master's degrees in the arts and sciences. The school also offers nine joint degree programs in conjunction with the other professional schools and the undergraduate college.

==== School of Business ====
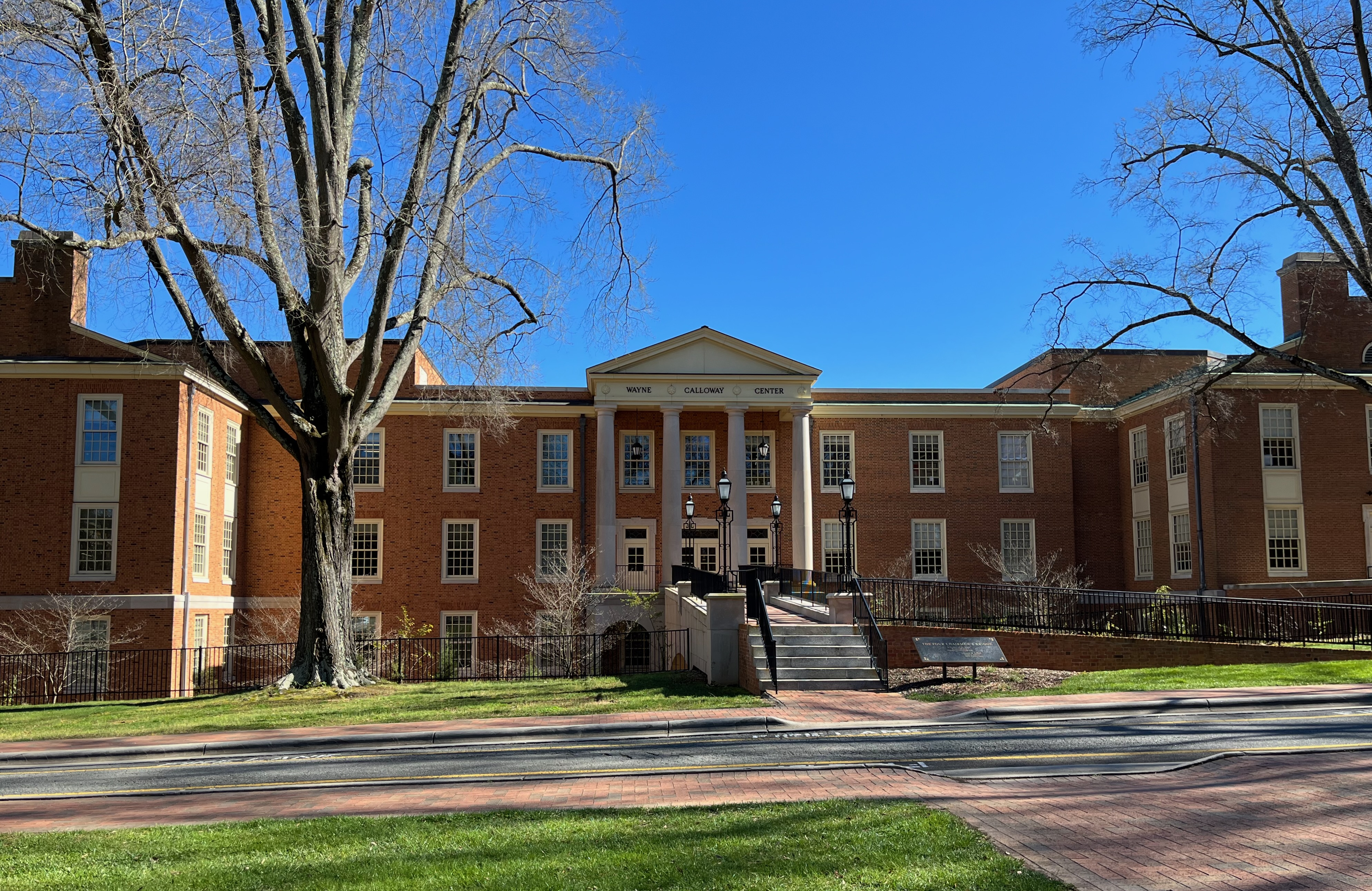
Calloway School of Business and Accountancy is the undergraduate school as part of Wake Forest University School of Business.

The Wake Forest School of Business was founded in 1969 as the Babcock School of Management, and the school now houses both graduate and undergraduate programs in the new Farrell Hall facility on the main Wake Forest campus. The school also maintains a campus in Charlotte, North Carolina, which houses an MBA program for working professionals.

The School of Business offers seven master's programs and four joint-degree programs, including full-time and part-time Master of Science in Business Administration, Master of Science in Accountancy, Master of Science in Business Analytics, and Master of Science in Management. The school offers a Bachelor of Science (BS) degree program for undergraduates. This is a four-year degree with majors in accountancy, business and enterprise management, finance, and mathematical business.

==== School of Divinity ====
The School of Divinity, accredited by the Association of Theological Schools, offers a Master of Divinity degree as well as dual-degree programs in bioethics, counseling and law. The school also offers a certificate in Spirituality and Health in association with the Wake Forest School of Medicine.

Gail O'Day was appointed in 2010 as dean of the school and professor of New Testament and preaching. The school has 18 faculty members, five adjunct faculty and 12 associated faculty from other university departments. According to its mission statement, the school is "Christian by tradition, Baptist in heritage, and ecumenical in outlook." In April 2019, Jonathan L. Walton was appointed as the new dean of the divinity school. On September 7, 2023, Corey D. B. Walker was appointed as the new dean replacing Walton.

Planning for the school began in April 1989. In May 1996, Bill J. Leonard was appointed the school's first dean, and in March 1998, the school selected its 14-member board of visitors. The first faculty members were named in April 1998, and additional faculty were hired that October. In August 1999, the first 24 students enrolled in the program. The university's first Master of Divinity degrees were conferred May 20, 2002.

In 2012, the school established the Food, Faith, and Religious Leadership Initiative to equip religious leaders with the knowledge, skills, and pastoral habits necessary to guide congregations and other faith-based organizations around food issues.

==== School of Law ====
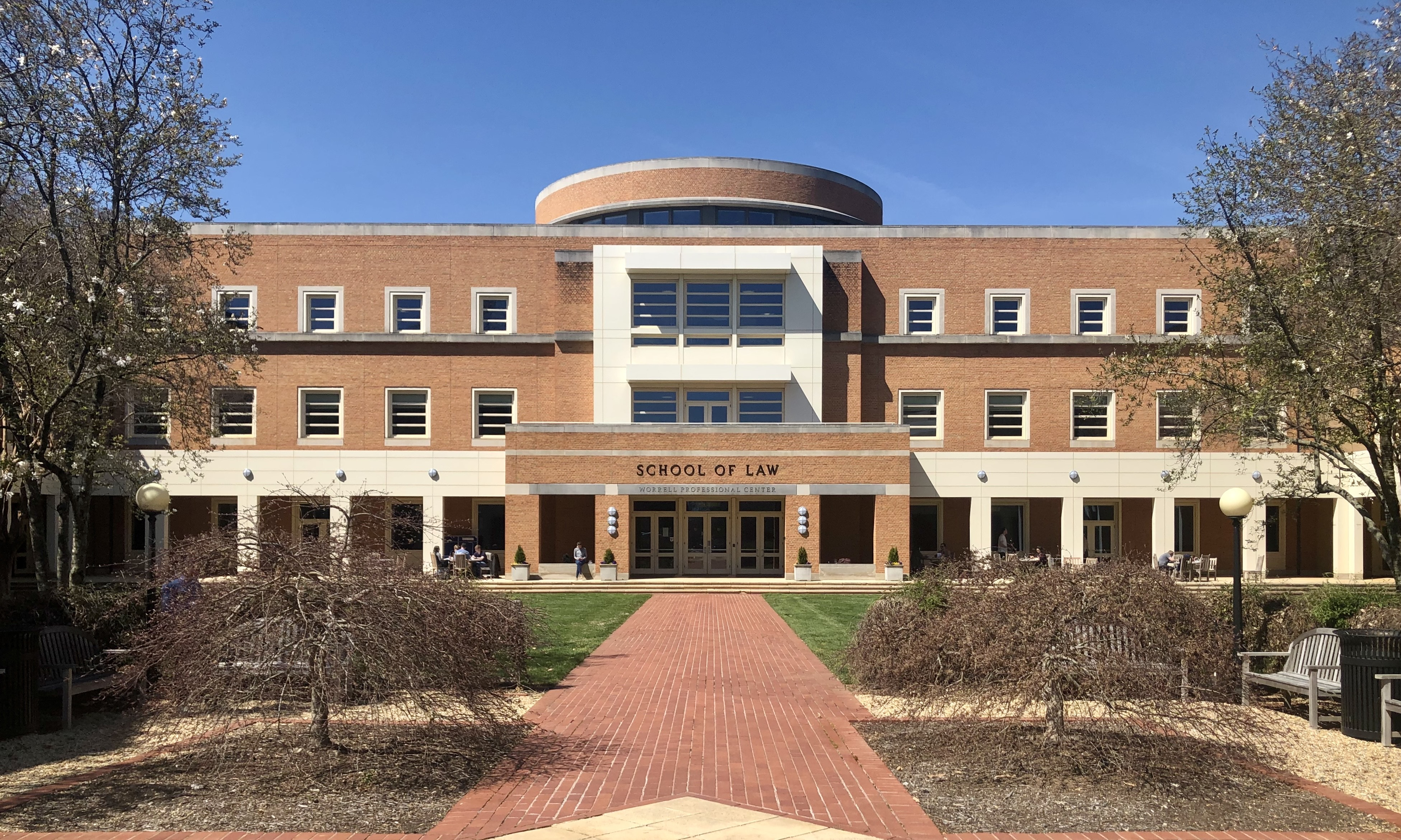
Worrell Professional Center, home to the School of Law

The Wake Forest University School of Law is a private American Bar Association-accredited law school and is a member of the Association of American Law Schools. The school was established in 1894. U.S. News & World Report consistently ranks it among the top 30 law schools in the nation. The current dean is Andrew Klein. Wake Forest University School of Law has a faculty of 52 resident faculty members and 40 extended faculty members.

Wake Forest Law offers the following degrees: the JD, the JD/M.Div., the JD/MA in Religion, the JD/MA in bioethics, the Master of Studies in Law, the Master of Laws in American Law, the SJD and the JD/MBA in conjunction with the university's Schools of Business. Class sizes are limited to sections of 40 in the first year, with legal writing classes limited to sections of 20.

==== School of Medicine ====
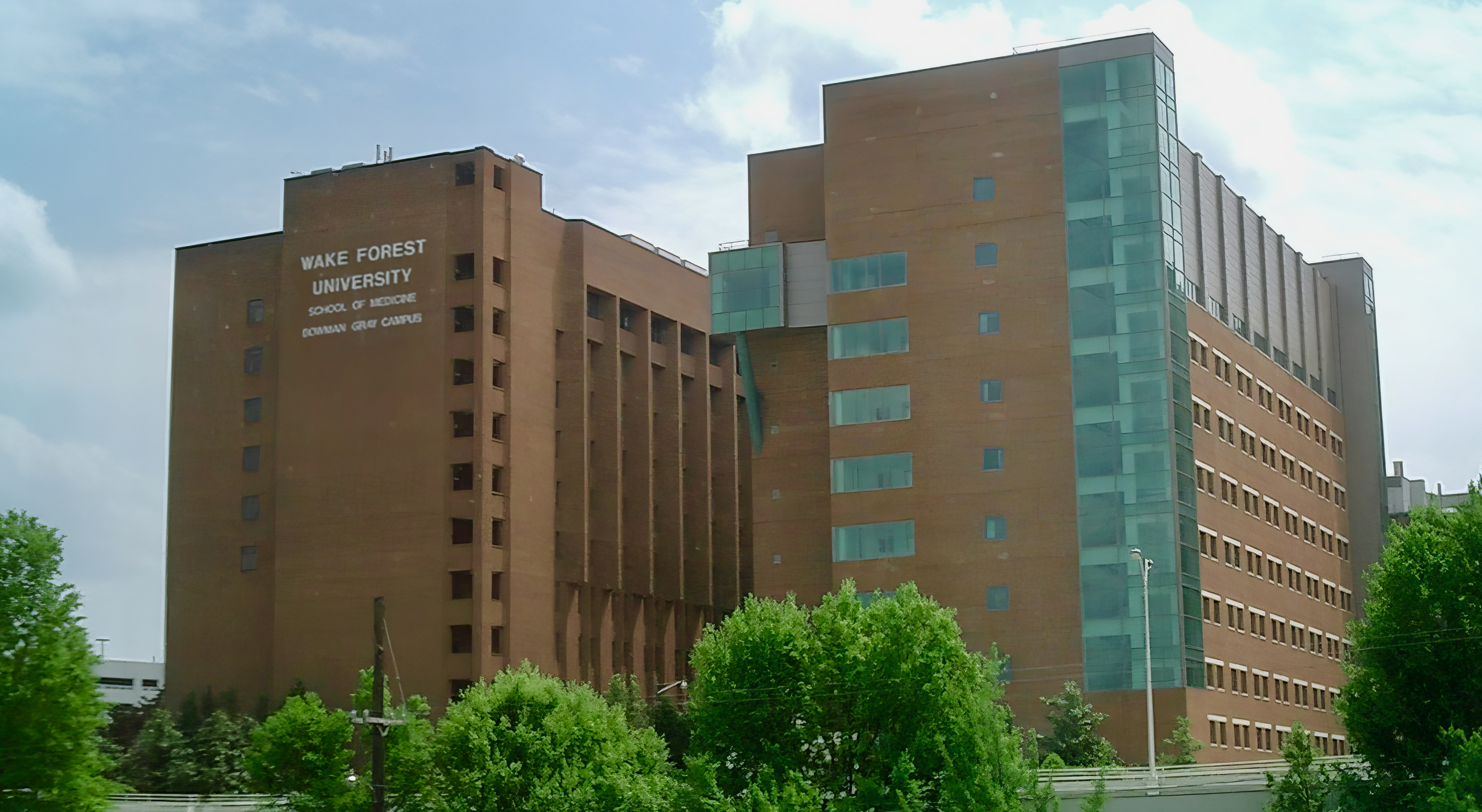
Wake Forest University School of Medicine, Bowman Gray campus

The Wake Forest School of Medicine has one campus on the Bowman Gray Campus in the Ardmore neighborhood of Winston-Salem, North Carolina, and a second campus downtown which opened in July 2016. Founded in 1902, the School of Medicine directs the education of about 1,800 students and fellows, including physicians, basic scientists and allied clinical professionals each year. It is clinically affiliated with Atrium Health Wake Forest Baptist and Wake Forest Community Physicians and, with its research program, forms the integrated academic medical center, Wake Forest Baptist Medical Center.

In addition to MD, PhD and MS degrees (including an MS for physician assistants), the School of Medicine has five joint-degree programs, nurse anesthesia and medical technology teaching programs, and is the clinical site for 10 Forsyth Technical Community College programs.

In its 2016 edition, U.S. News & World Report ranked it tied for 52nd best in research and tied for 74th in primary care. The nurse anesthesia program is ranked 10th nationally.

The School of Medicine ranks among the top third of American medical schools in total funding from the National Institutes of Health (NIH). In the 2012 fiscal year, the school was awarded nearly $185 million in research funding from federal and state agencies, industry and other sources. In November 2023, the School of Medicine pledged $100 million to help fund research.

==== School of Professional Studies ====
Established in 2021, the School of Professional Studies offers Master's programs and graduate certificates and certifications as well as Non-Credit programs and boot camps, with most courses being virtually online.

=== Rankings and reputation ===
In the 2027 U.S. News & World Report America's Best Colleges report, Wake Forest ranked 12th for "Best Undergraduate Teaching", 32nd for "Best Value", and tied for 34th overall among national universities in the U.S. Forbes ranked Wake Forest as 33rd in Research Universities and 46th in Private Colleges. In 2024, U.S. News & World Report ranked Wake Forest 3rd among best national universities in North Carolina behind Duke University and University of North Carolina at Chapel Hill. Wake Forest is accredited by the Southern Association of Colleges and Schools. Wake Forest is often listed as a Hidden Ivy and Southern Ivy institution, due to its similar academic excellence of the eight Ivy League universities.

Academic rankings

National
- Forbes: 112
- U.S. News & World Report: 34 (tie)
- Washington Monthly: 108
- WSJ/College Pulse: 93

Global
- ARWU: 501–600
- QS: 801–850
- THE: 401–500
- U.S. News & World Report: 514 (tie)

USNWR graduate school rankings
Accounting	56 (tie)
Business Analytics	54 (tie)
Biological Sciences	88 (tie)
Chemistry	125
Finance	72 (tie)
Information Systems	50 (tie)
Law	30 (tie)
Medicine: Primary Care	68
Medicine: Research	52
Nursing–Anesthesia	12 (tie)
Physician Assistant	7
Physics	105
Statistics	66 (tie)

=== Research ===
Wake Forest is classified among "R2: Doctoral Universities – High Research Spending and Doctorate Production". According to the National Science Foundation, it spent $191 million on research and development in 2018, ranking it 117th in the nation.

==== Centers and institutes ====
- The Humanities Institute
- Wake Forest University Center for Bioethics, Health & Society
- Andrew Sabin Family Center for Environment and Substainability
- Center for Functional Materials
- Wake the Arts Center
- Center for Literacy Education
- Center for Molecular Signaling
- Center for Nanotechnology and Molecular Materials
- The Center for Research on Abroad and International Student Engagement (RAISE Center)
- Center for Research, Engagement and Collaboration in African American Life
- Translational Science Center

=== University press ===
Wake Forest University Press was established in 1976 by Irish scholar Dillon Johnston with the support of provost Edwin Wilson and president James Ralph Scales. It has a strong focus on Irish poetry with published poets including Ciaran Carson, Thomas Kinsella, Michael Longley, Medbh McGuckian, John Montague, Eilean Ni Chuilleanain, and Irish language poet Nuala Ni Dhomhnaill.

== Student life ==
Student body composition as of May 2, 2022
Race and ethnicity	Total
White	69%
Foreign national	9%
Hispanic	8%
Black	6%
Other (Note: Other consists of Multiracial Americans & those who prefer to not say.)	4%
Asian	4%
Economic diversity
Low-income (Note: The percentage of students who received an income-based federal Pell grant intended for low-income students.)	9%
Affluent (Note: The percentage of students who are a part of the American middle class at the bare minimum.)	91%

=== Student organizations ===
There are over 225 chartered student organizations. Student sports organizations are highly visible on campus. Special interest organizations range from the academic, such the Model United Nations team, to the artistic, such as the handbell choir. In the spring of 2006, the Mock Trial team qualified for the national tournament while only in its second year in operation. There are numerous religious organizations. Both the College Republicans and College Democrats have active chapters at the university. Historic student organizations such as the Philomathesian, an artistic literary society, are also present. Students are entertained by numerous performing groups, including the Lilting Banshees Comedy Troupe, the Living Parables Christian Drama Troupe, and the Anthony Aston Players.

The Office of Student Engagement oversees all student organizations and fraternities and sororities. Student Engagement also organizes leadership-oriented student activities such as CHARGE (formerly called LEAD), a semester-long course in campus leadership.

=== Student Union ===
The event-planning arm of Wake Forest is an undergraduate student-run organization known as Student Union. Events include Homecoming, Family Weekend, Special Lectures, Concerts, the Coffeehouse music series and other weekly events such as movie screenings and Tuesday Trivia nights. Its signature event is the annual "Shag on the Mag" where a big tent covers Manchester Quad (formerly the Magnolia Quad) during Springfest and students shag dance to a live band. It started in 2005 under then Springfest chairman Joseph Bumgarner.

=== Student government ===
Founded in 1923, Wake Forest Student Government (known as SG) works under a semi-Presidential system. Four executive officers (Student Body President, Speaker of the House, Secretary and Treasurer) are elected each spring. The President appoints a Chief of Staff. The Executive Officers coordinate with the Cabinet, formed by the Co-Chairs of the seven standing committees. The seven committees are Academic, Campus Life, Diversity & Inclusion, Judiciary, Public Relations, Physical Planning, and The Student Organizations Council (SOC). The executive committee and Cabinet work with members of the Senate to pass legislation and advocate on behalf of students.

The Senate, which acts as a student legislature, is made up of about 60 senators, chosen in fall and spring elections each year. The legislators are assigned to one of seven committees focused on an area of student needs. The student trustee is an ex-officio member of Student Government and acts as a liaison between the board of trustees and Student Government.

=== Student media ===
- WAKE Radio was founded by a student group in 1985 after WFDD terminated a long-standing position of student broadcast assistants.
- The Student, founded in 2004, is a website created and run by students to help integrate the student body with academic activities and social events around campus and the Winston-Salem area.
- The Old Gold & Black (OGB) is Wake Forest University's school newspaper, publishing bi-weekly in print and daily on its website. It takes its name from the university's official colors. It was established in 1916 and has been produced by a group of student editors, reporters, and photographers every year since then. Notable alumni include Al Hunt, current managing editor for Bloomberg News in Washington DC; W. J. Cash, who wrote The Mind of the South; and Wayne King, who won a Pulitzer Prize for his coverage of the 12th Street Riot in Detroit in 1967.
- Wake Forest Review is an independent student newspaper providing news and commentary "from a libertarian and conservative perspective."
- Wake TV is the university television channel. It features weekly television content like Wake TV News and Entertainment Wakely. Past students have collaborated with ESPNU to create media packages featuring Wake Forest athletes.
- Wake Forest Journal of Business and Intellectual Property Law, founded in 2001, is a student-run law journal.
- Wake Forest Law Review founded in 1965, is a law journal edited and published by Wake Forest School of Law students.
- The Howler is the annual yearbook.
- 3 to 4 Ounces is the official literary magazine on campus, publishing a collection of student prose, poetry, and art through a blind application process each semester. It is the longest-running media outlet on campus, as it began in 1882 as The Student when the school was still known as Wake Forest College.

=== WFDD ===
WFDD is an NPR affiliate which was founded in 1946. The station has a signal strength of 36,000 watts, and broadcasts to 32 counties in North Carolina and Virginia. The station has broadcast on 88.5 FM since 1967.

=== Debate team ===
The Wake Forest Debate team won the National Debate Tournament in 1997 and 2008, made the finals in 2006 and 2009, and has had six semifinal teams: 1955, 1993, 1994, 1995, 2017, and 2019. Wake Forest has had two winners of the "National Coach of the Year" award: Ross Smith (1997) and Al Louden (1988). The award is named for Smith.

Notable debate alumni include Daveed Gartenstein-Ross, the director of the Center for the Study of Terrorist Radicalization at the Foundation for Defense of Democracies; Larry Penley, the former president of Colorado State University; John Graham, the former regulatory czar for George W. Bush; and Franklin Shirley and Martha Swain Wood, both former mayors of Winston-Salem.

In 2010, Wake Forest became the first top-tier debate team in the country to go "open source" and share all its evidence and arguments online through a wiki accessible to other debaters.

=== Volunteer Service Corps ===
The Volunteer Service Corps (VSC) is one of the most popular student organizations. It coordinates volunteering in both the local and international/national setting via service projects and trips. The organization has annual service trips to Russia, Vietnam, and Latin America. In light of the disaster caused by Hurricane Katrina, VSC sent 30 Wake students on a Wake Alternative Spring Break in the spring of 2006.

=== Army Reserve Officers' Training Corps ===
Wake Forest University offers an Army Reserve Officers' Training Corps (AROTC) program. At Wake Forest, contracted ROTC cadets are given full scholarship, a monthly stipend, and book money by the US Army. The university extends the scholarship with free room and board. The program also serves students from Winston-Salem State University and Salem College.

=== Fraternities and sororities ===
With 24 chapters, fraternity and sorority membership consists of around 45 percent of the undergraduate student population. Wake Forest requires that all new members of fraternities and sororities complete at least one semester of full-time studies, so the primary recruiting time is during the spring semester.

In the mid-2010s, fraternities at Wake Forest began to come under more public scrutiny for claims of sexual assault, racism, and violence.

=== Athletic activities ===
Wake Forest offers classes in yoga, Pilates, high-intensity interval training (HIIT), Zumba, BodyPump, and indoor cycling. 36 club sport teams compete against other colleges and universities at the regional and national level. Over half of the student body participates in 18 different intramural sports. The university's fitness and recreation center, Reynolds Gym, is the oldest gym in the ACC. It was renovated in March 2018 and renamed the Wake Forest Wellbeing Center. The project includes the addition of the Sutton Center which opened in January 2016.

=== Undergraduate student housing ===
Students are guaranteed housing for four years. As of 2010, students were required to live on campus for their first three years as full-time enrolled students.

The three main community areas for the 2025–2026 academic year are:

- South Campus (first-year student housing): Babcock Hall, Bostwick Hall, Johnson Hall, Luter Hall, Collins Hall, Hopkins Hall, Huffman Hall, and Angelou Hall
- Quad Area (upperclass student housing): Kitchin Hall, Davis Hall, Poteat/Huffman Halls, and Taylor/Efird Halls
- North Area (upperclass student housing): Magnolia Hall, Dogwood Hall, Polo Hall, Martin Hall, Palmer Hall, Piccolo Hall, North Campus Apartments, Student Apartments, and Polo Road houses area

=== Personal and career development ===
In 2009, President Nathan Hatch outlined in his strategic plan a campus culture in which personal and career development would become an integral component of the undergraduate student experience. Later that year, he created a cabinet-level position and appointed Andy Chan as the vice president for personal and career development.

Chan's work has included hosting a national conference in 2012 ("Rethinking Success: From the Liberal Arts to Careers in the 21st Century") featuring Condoleezza Rice, and issuing "A Roadmap for Transforming the College-To-Career Experience" in 2013. Wake Forest quadrupled the size of the staff, integrated personal and career development into freshman orientation, and added "College to Career" courses.

=== Arts ===
Every student takes at least one course in the arts (art history, studio art, theatre, dance, music performance and music in liberal arts) before graduating. In 2011–2012, more than 500 Wake Forest students were directly involved in performances on campus, and 110 public exhibitions in theatre, music, dance, and visual arts were held in Scales Fine Arts Center in 2012–2013. The university's home, Winston-Salem, calls itself the "City of Arts & Innovation".

Students also can take advantage of a number of other art-related opportunities:

- The WFU Art Collections consist of nine independent collections with more than 1,600 works located in 35 on- and off-campus locations. Every four years, selected students make an art-buying trip to New York City to add to the collections.
- Students are within walking distance of the Reynolda House Museum of American Art, the Wake Forest Museum of Anthropology, the Charlotte and Philip Hanes Art Gallery and START, the student art gallery.
- The Theatre Department, which allows students to participate from their first year, supports interdisciplinary exploration of its plays through the Interdisciplinary Performance and the Liberal Arts Center (IPLACe), which connects the performing arts and other academic departments.
- The student-run Reynolda Film Festival is a free, week-long series of film screenings and workshops featuring a keynote address by a well-known and respected representative of the film industry.
- The Secrest Artists Series offers the Wake Forest community several free opportunities each year to hear world-class concerts.

=== Traditions ===
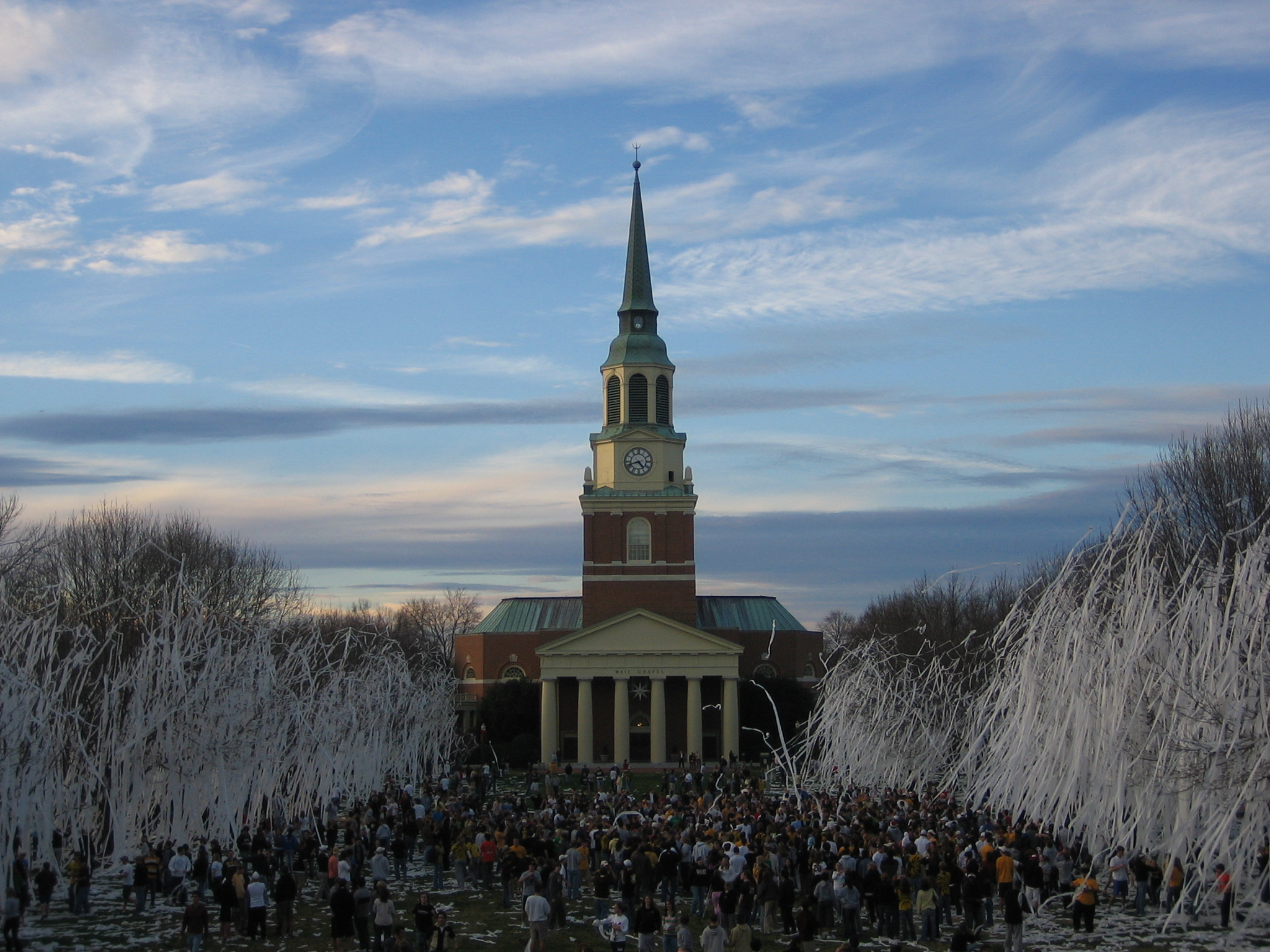
"Rolling the Quad" is a WFU tradition done after major athletic victories.

- Arnold Palmer Day: Each year Wake Forest University and its students celebrate PGA Tour legend Arnold Palmer, who attended Wake Forest in the late 1940s and early 1950s.
- Bell Tower/Tunnel Tours: Each spring, Wake Forest seniors can tour and explore the tunnels of the Wait Chapel, and often add their signatures on the chapel's woodwork.
- Deacon Dash/First Year Field Run: Every year during the first Wake Forest Football game, first-year students rush the field.
- CP3 Day: Every year Wake Forest and its students celebrate former Wake Forest basketball alum and NBA player and Winston-Salem native Chris Paul on Manchester Plaza, where students are offered Krispy Kreme doughnuts.
- D.E.S.K: This longstanding campus tradition brings local elementary students each spring to campus to create inspiring and colorful study spaces.
- Hit the Bricks: Started in 2003, this campus-wide tradition is a philanthropic event that benefits the Brian Piccolo Cancer Research Fund as well as the Comprehensive Cancer Center at Atrium Health Wake Forest Baptist. Every fall semester, members of the campus community meet at Hearn Plaza and take turns running and walking around the Quad to support the fight against cancer.
- Lighting the Quad: Each year, the Wake Forest community celebrates the holiday season at Hearn Plaza.
- Lovefeast: Started in 1965 by Moravian student Jane Sherrill Stroupe ('67), this longtime tradition has become the largest Moravian-style lovefest in the nation.
- Pitsgiving: Each fall, Pitsgiving is an annual Wake Forest Thanksgiving holiday dinner.
- President's Ball: Each year, the university, students, staff and faculty celebrate the university president.
- Pro Humanitate Days: During this annual event, Wake Forest alumni, students, faculty and staff from around the world volunteer to help the local community.
- Project Pumpkin: Started in 1988, this student-led project and community-building event brings together the campus as well as the Winston-Salem community. The event also brings local children to the Reynolda campus for a fall festival, which includes educational activities and trick-or-treating.
- Rolling the Quad: Started in the 1950s, students celebrate Wake Forest athletic teams' wins by rolling toilet paper all over the quad and trees, especially when those victories are against other teams in the Tobacco Road rivalry.
- Wake 'N Shake: Every spring, Wake Forest student participants stay awake and on their feet for 12 hours straight to participate in the Wake 'N Shake Marathon to raise awareness of cancer. In 2022, students raised over $3 million.

=== School songs ===
Notable among the songs commonly played and sung at events such as commencement, convocation, alumni reunions and athletic games are the alma mater, "Dear Old Wake Forest", and the fight song "O Here's To Wake Forest".

=== Screamin' Demons ===
Student attendance of football and Basketball games is high, in part due to the program known as "Screamin' Demons". At the beginning of each athletic season, students on the Reynolda Campus can sign up for a program whereby they pay $40 to get the best seats at the games, a football shirt in the fall and a tie-dye T-shirt in the spring, along with a card that serves as an automatic pass to the sporting events. They lose this privilege if they miss two games. Through the planning of Sports Marketing and the Screamin' Demons program, basketball game seats in the students section are difficult to attain without participating in the Screamin' Demons program. The arena can seat only 2,250 of the 4,500 undergraduate students. At least 150 seats are set aside for non-Screamin Demons, who sit behind the 2,100 member group.

== Athletics ==
Wake Forest Athletics logo

Originally, Wake Forest's athletic teams were known as the Old Gold and Black or the Baptists, due to its association with the Baptist Convention (from which it later separated). However, in 1923, after a particularly impressive win against nearby rival the Duke Blue Devils, a newspaper reporter wrote that the Deacons "fought like Demons", giving rise to the current team name, the "Demon Deacons".

Wake Forest's Athletic teams have won a total of 11 NCAA team national championships in five sports. The women's field hockey team has won three (2002, 2003, 2004); the men's golf team has won three (1974, 1975, 1986); the men's tennis has won two (2018, 2025); and the men's soccer team (2007), the baseball team (1955), women's golf (2023) have won one each. Wake Forest has a 96% student athlete graduation rate. Wake Forest is sometimes referred to as being a part of "Tobacco Road" or "The Big Four", terms that refer to the four North Carolina schools that compete heatedly against each other within the ACC; these are Duke, North Carolina, and North Carolina State, and Wake Forest.

The Wake Forest Demon Deacons participate in the NCAA's Division I (in the Bowl Subdivision for football) and in the Atlantic Coast Conference. Men's sports include baseball, basketball, cross country, football, golf, soccer, tennis, and track & field; women's sports include basketball, cross country, field hockey, golf, soccer, tennis, track & field, and volleyball.

=== Football ===
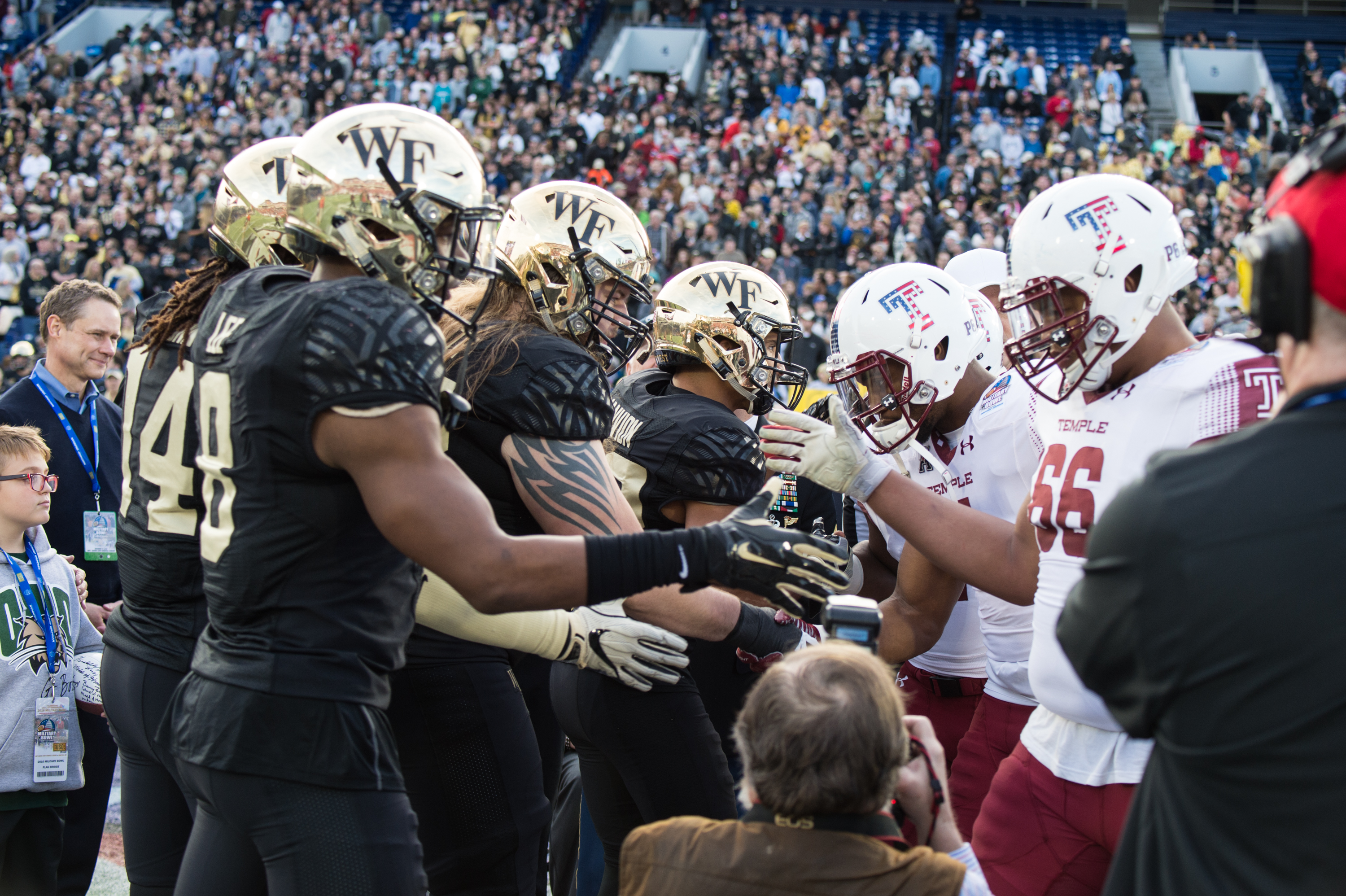
Demon Deacons players at the 2016 Military Bowl

Wake Forest plays its home football games at Allegacy Federal Credit Union Stadium. The Demon Deacons have won two ACC Football Championships. The program has had four players named as ACC Player of the Year, four consensus All-Americans, including 17 bowl appearances.

=== Men's and women's basketball ===
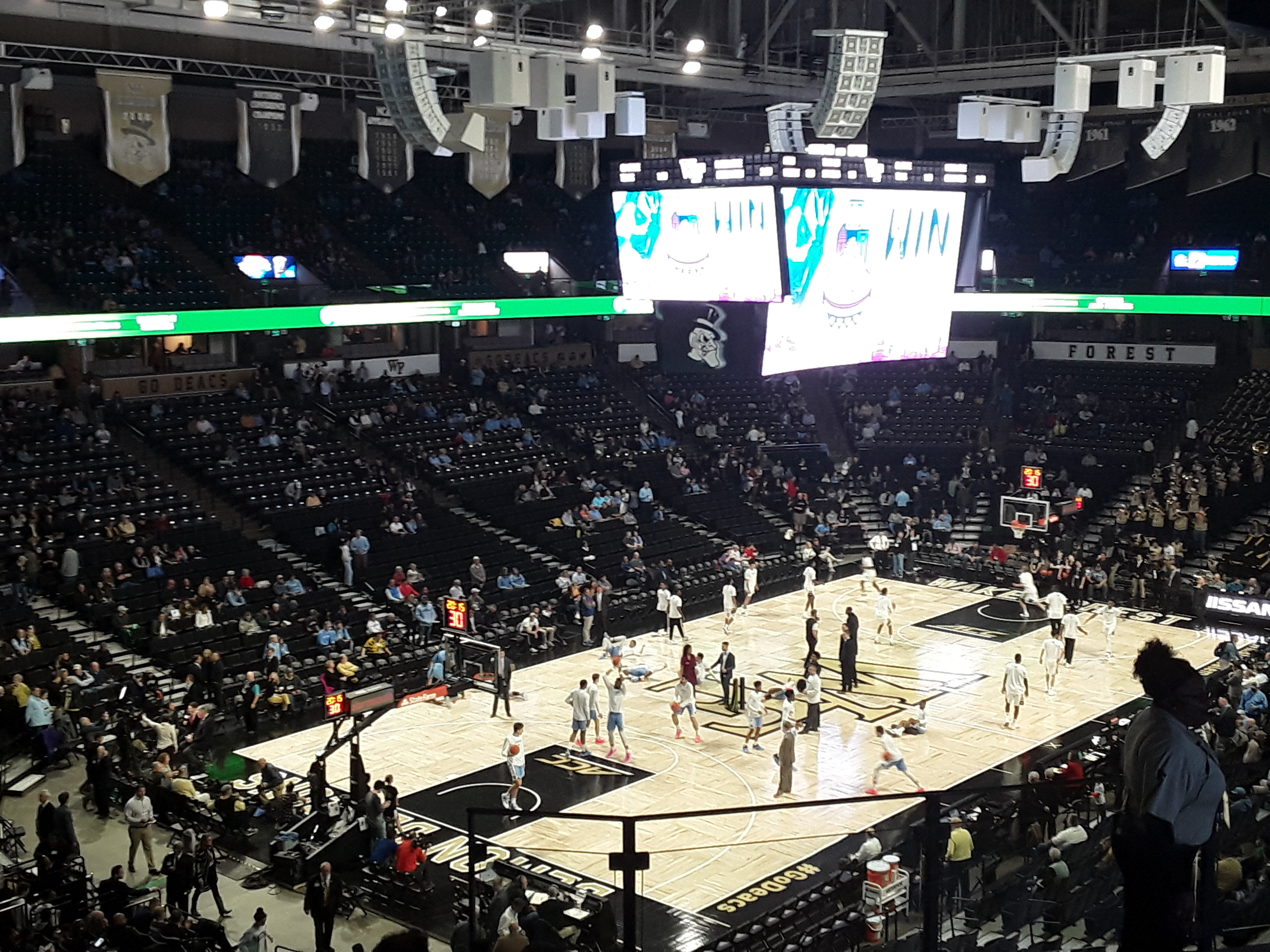
Lawrence Joel Veterans Memorial Coliseum is home to both Wake Forest Demon Deacons men's basketball and Wake Forest Demon Deacons women's basketball.

Wake Forest is generally regarded as a competitive program in men's basketball, having won four ACC tournament titles and frequently qualifying for the NCAA tournament (23 times in the school's history). They reached the Final Four once, in 1962.

The school's notable basketball alumni include Billy Packer, a guard on the 1962 Final Four team who became far more famous as a basketball broadcaster; Tyrone Curtis "Muggsy" Bogues, the shortest player ever to play in the NBA; Randolph Childress, MVP of the 1995 ACC tournament; 2006 NBA Rookie of the Year Award and 12-time NBA All-star Chris Paul; two-time league MVP, five-time NBA champion, and three-time NBA Finals MVP Tim Duncan, John Collins of the Detroit Pistons; and NBA all-star and champion Jeff Teague.

Wake Forest Demon Deacons women's basketball team also boosts a competitive program. In 2012, Jen Hoover took over as coach from Mike Petersen, the program's all-time winningest coach. Hoover (then Jenny Mitchell) is the program's all-time leading scorer and rebounder, was a three-time All-ACC selection, and was a member of the ACC's 50th Anniversary Team in 2002. Hoover was part of the program's only NCAA tournament appearance in 1988, when Wake Forest beat Villanova and lost to Tennessee. Wake Forest has appeared in the Women's NIT four times, all under Petersen. In 2015, Dearica Hamby was drafted 6th overall in the WNBA draft by the San Antonio Stars (now Las Vegas Aces). Lawrence Joel Veterans Memorial Coliseum is the home venue for the Demon Deacons basketball teams.

=== Women's field hockey ===
Recent athletic honors include three consecutive NCAA field hockey national championships in 2002, 2003, and 2004 under Head Coach Jennifer Averill. In 2005, the Deacs were defeated in the semifinal round by Duke University, and in the 2006 championship game by the University of Maryland.

=== Men's and women's golf ===
Wake Forest has had several successful golf teams, with its men's team winning national championships in 1974, 1975, and 1986, while its women's team won its first championship in 2023. Notable players include Jay Haas, Billy Andrade, Gary Hallberg, Scott Hoch, Bill Haas, Will Zalatoris, Cameron Young, Laura Diaz, Ólafía Þórunn Kristinsdóttir, Jennifer Kupcho, Cheyenne Woods, and majors champions Arnold Palmer, Lanny Wadkins, Darren Clarke, Curtis Strange, and Webb Simpson.

=== Soccer ===
Wake Forest is a consistent national title contender in men's soccer. Several players from the program have played professionally in Major League Soccer, including Brian Carroll, Will Hesmer, Justin Moose, Michael Parkhurst, Pat Phelan, James Riley, Scott Sealy, Matt Taylor, and Wells Thompson. In 2006 the team advanced to the final four of the NCAA tournament, where they were defeated in a penalty kick shootout by UC Santa Barbara. They captured the 2007 NCAA Men's Soccer Championship defeating Ohio State 2–1, with the winning goal scored by Zack Schilawski. The Demon Deacons returned to the final four of the 2009 Division I Men's College Cup, losing to Virginia 2–1 in overtime in the semifinals. The Demon Deacons reached the NCAA Championship game again in 2016, losing to Stanford in the College Cup Championship.

=== Baseball ===
Wake Forest won the 1955 College World Series in baseball. In 2009, the team began playing at David F. Couch Ballpark, in Winston-Salem, NC, moving to this field from their former home at Gene Hooks Stadium on campus. In 2017, eight players were selected in the 2017 MLB draft, the most in Wake Forest baseball history.

=== Tennis ===
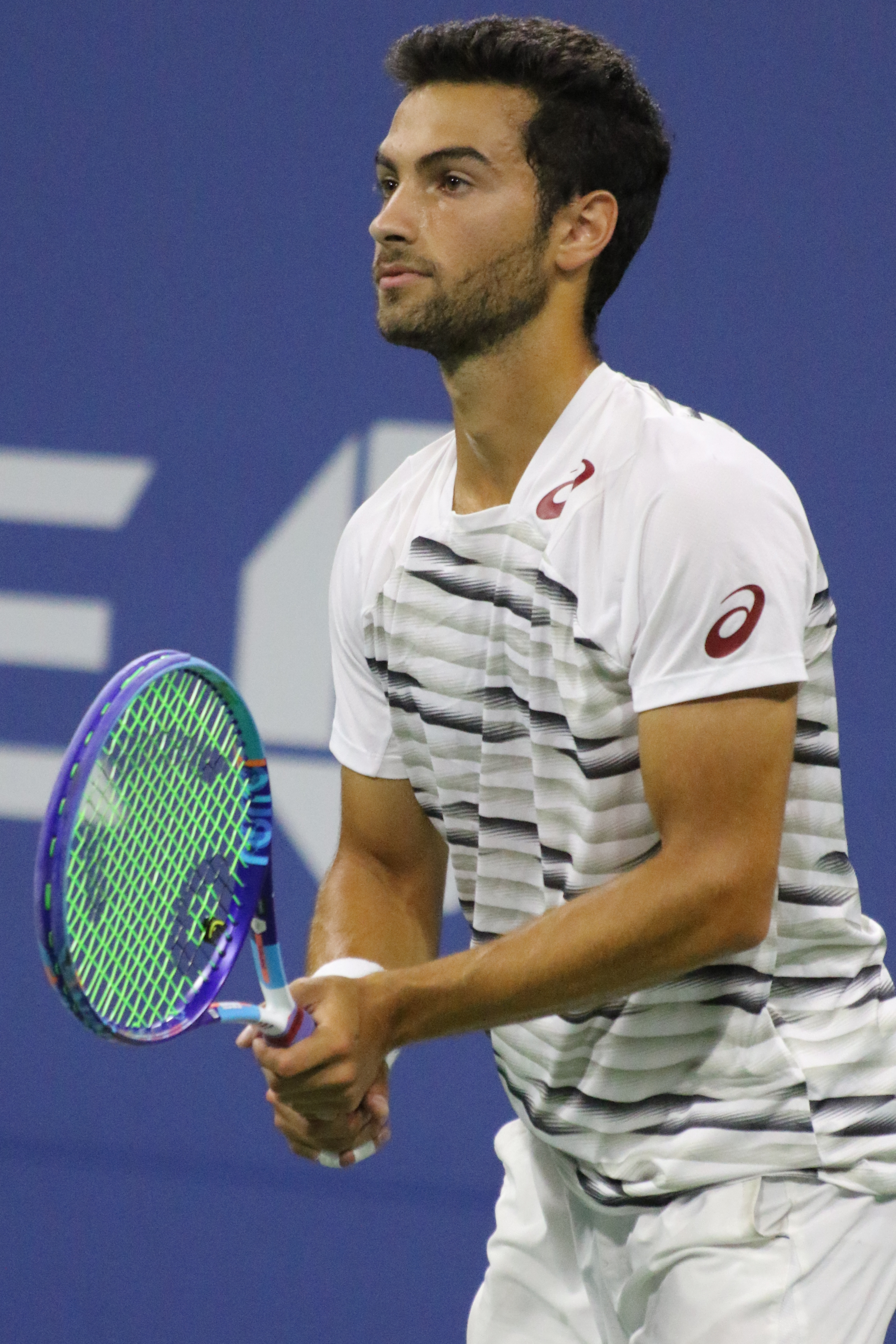
Noah Rubin

Noah Rubin played for Wake Forest; he had won the 2014 boys singles championship at Wimbledon, and the US 2014 boys' national championships in singles and doubles. In 2014–2015 for Wake Forest he was an All-American and the runner-up in the 2015 NCAA singles championship.

On May 22, 2018, the Wake Forest men's tennis team won its first ever NCAA National Championship. This feat was accomplished on their home courts, as they defeated the Ohio State Men's Tennis team 4–2. Wake Forest had been ranked as the number one team for most of the season leading up to the tournament. In 2025, Wake Forest men's tennis defeated TCU 4–2 to claim its second NCAA National Championship.

== Alumni ==
Wake Forest has over 82,000 living alumni, with 39% living in North Carolina, and others residing in 97 foreign countries. Alumni include 18 Rhodes Scholars, including 13 since 1986; five Marshall Scholars; 18 Truman Scholars; and 62 Fulbright recipients since 1993.

Notable alumni in the sporting arena include basketball players Al-Farouq Aminu, Muggsy Bogues, Randolph Childress, John Collins, Tim Duncan, Josh Howard, James Johnson, Jake LaRavia, Chris Paul, Rodney Rogers, Ish Smith and Jeff Teague; golfers Arnold Palmer, Curtis Strange, Lanny Wadkins, Will Zalatoris and Webb Simpson; and football players Norm Snead, Ricky Proehl, Billy Ray Barnes, Bill George and Brian Piccolo.

Alumni in politics and government include members of United States Congress such as, Richard Burr, Ted Budd, Kay Hagan, Donna Edwards, George Holding, Larry Kissell, and Brad Knott; former RNC chairman Michael Whatley; U.S. diplomats David Funderburk and Robert S. Gilchrist; U.S. governors Thomas Walter Bickett, Charlie Crist (attended two years; transferred to Florida State University), Bob Ehrlich, and Charles Aurelius Smith, White House cabinet members Jennifer M. Harris, economics advisor under the Biden Administration, and Robert Wilkie, former United States secretary of Veterans Affairs under the first Trump administration.

Wake Forest alumni in the arts, entertainment and media field include actors Marc Blucas, and Lee Norris; television personalities Tyler Cameron, Andi Dorfman of The Bachelorette, Matt James of The Bachelor, and Cheslie Kryst; political commentator and television host Melissa Harris-Perry; author Emily Giffin; and journalists Al Hunt of Bloomberg News, Pulitzer Prize-winning Maria Henson, Shane Harris of The Atlantic, and Dagen McDowell of Fox News.

Business alumni include D. Wayne Calloway (CEO of PepsiCo), Charlie Ergen (co-founder and chairman of EchoStar and Dish Network), David Farr (CEO of Emerson Electric Company and board director of IBM), Robin Ganzert (CEO and president of American Humane Society), Anil Rai Gupta (Havells), Warren Stephens (Stephens Inc.), Joseph W. Luter III (Smithfield Foods), G. Kennedy Thompson (Wachovia), and Eric C. Wiseman (VF Corporation).

Many Wake Forest alumni such as James Archibald Campbell, Spright Dowell, Michael Maxey, and George M. Modlin have become presidents of numerous colleges and institutions.

Notable Wake Forest alumni

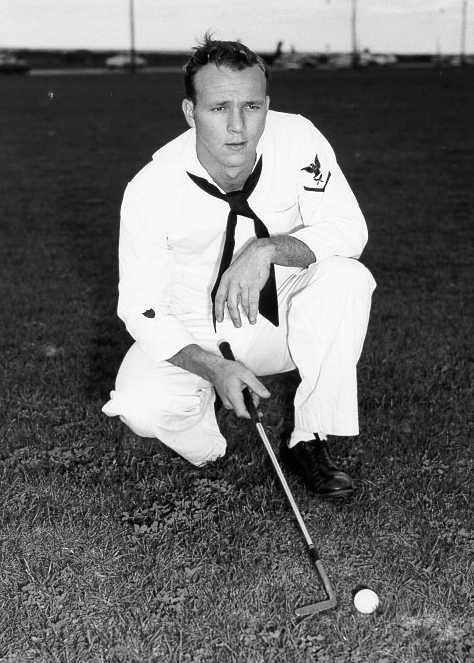
PGA golfer Arnold Palmer (1948–1954)

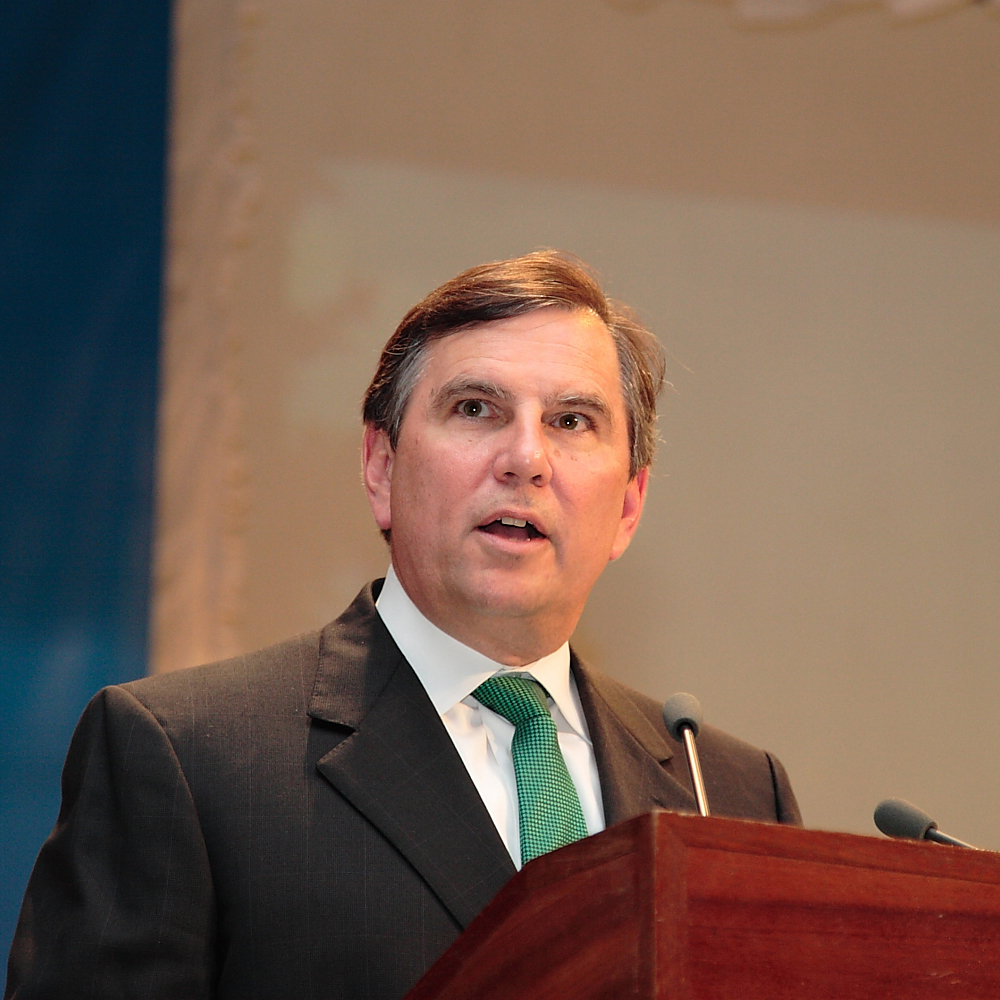
Former Chairman & CEO of Emerson Electric David Farr (B.A. 1977)

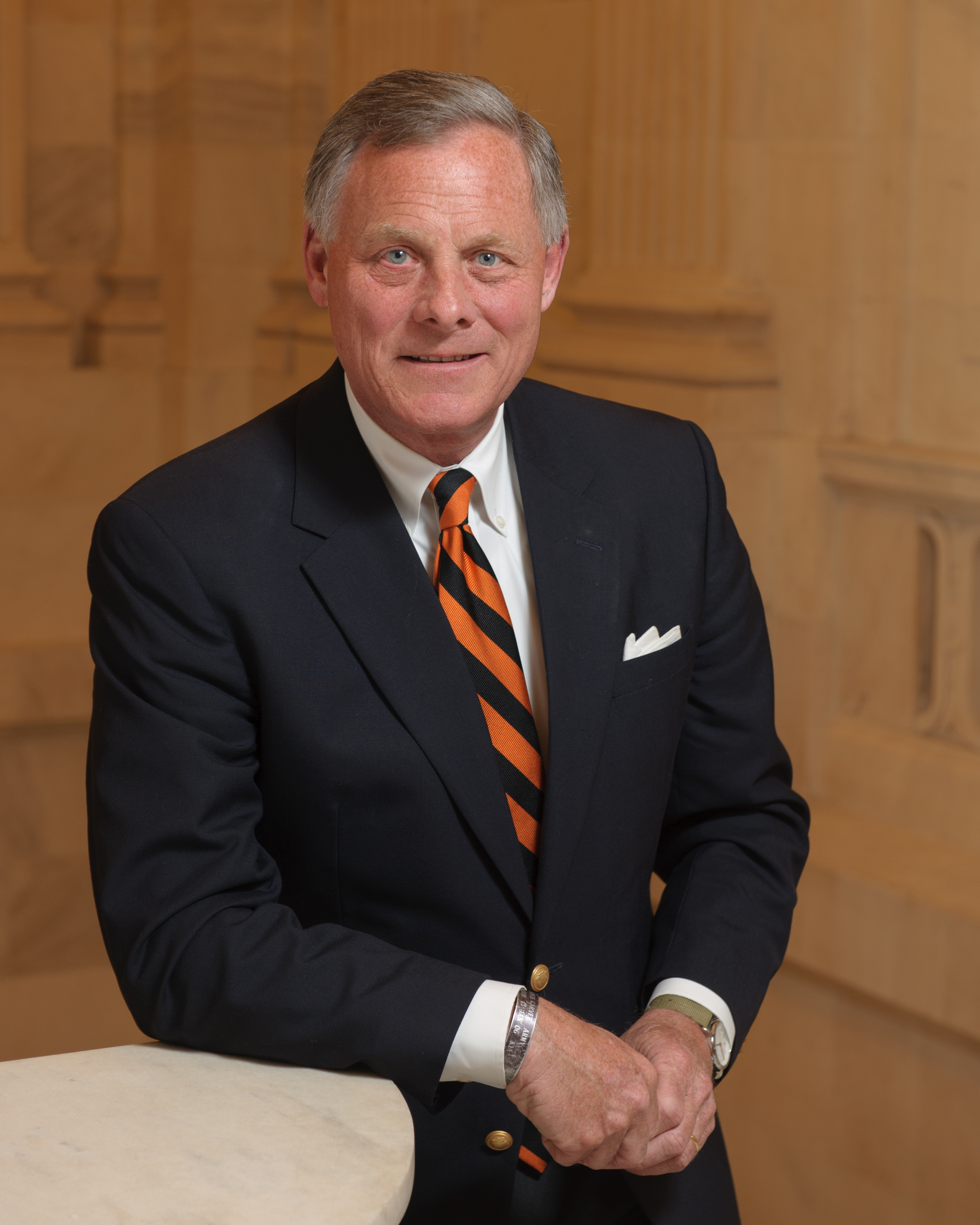
Former United States Senator from North Carolina Richard Burr (B.A. 1978)

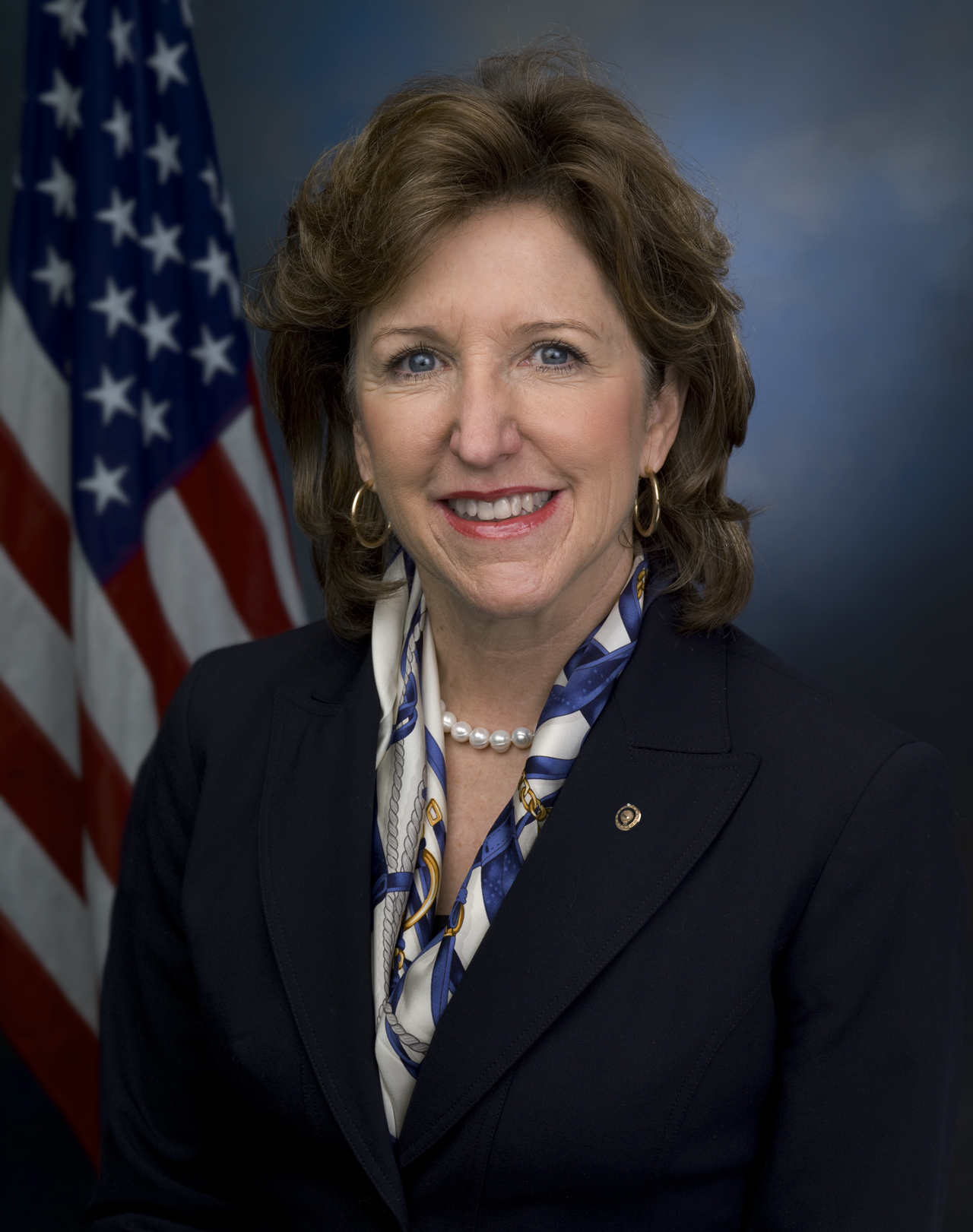
Former United States Senator of North Carolina Kay Hagan (J.D. 1978)

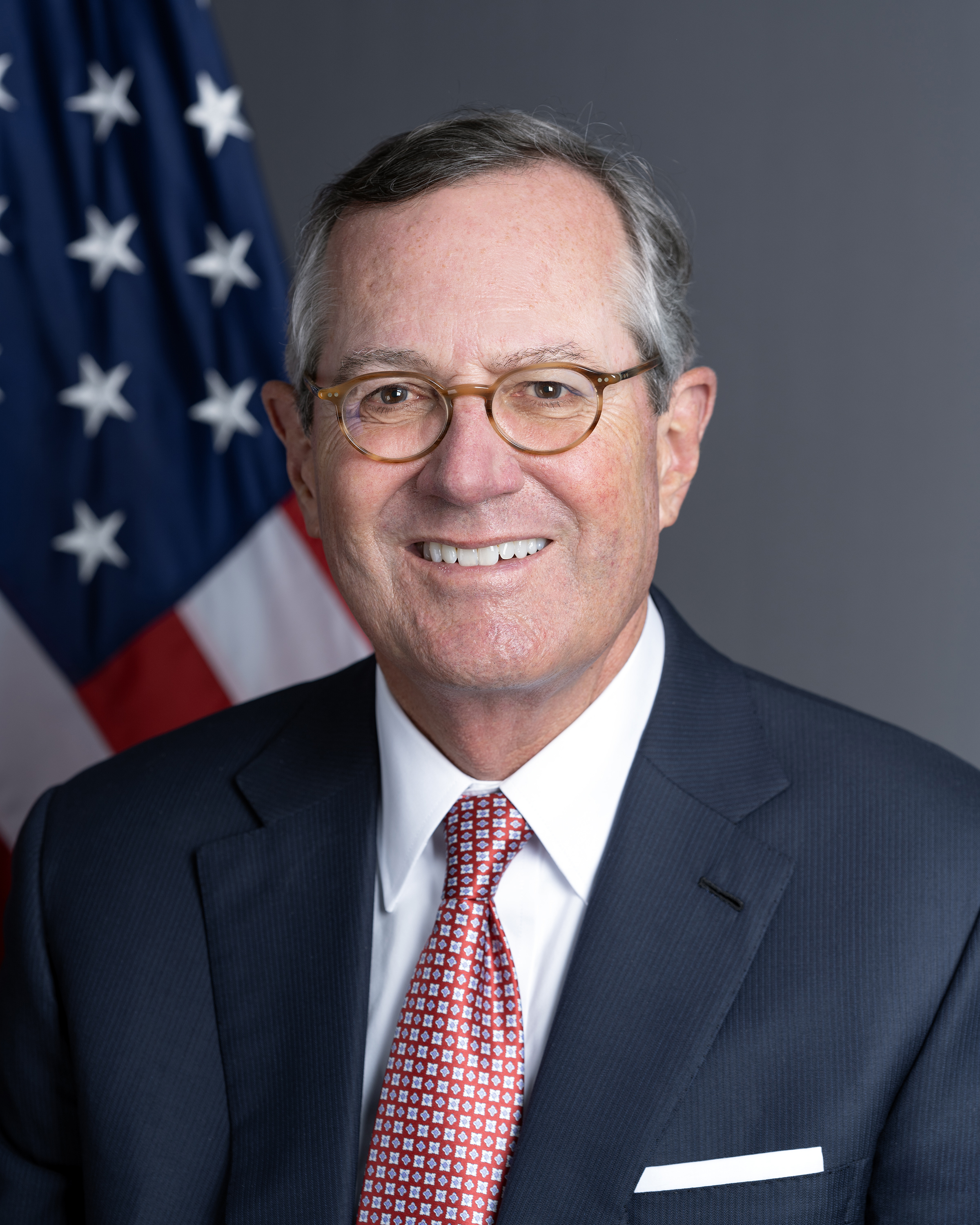
American billionaire, chairman, president and CEO of Stephens Inc. Warren Stephens (M.B.A. 1981)

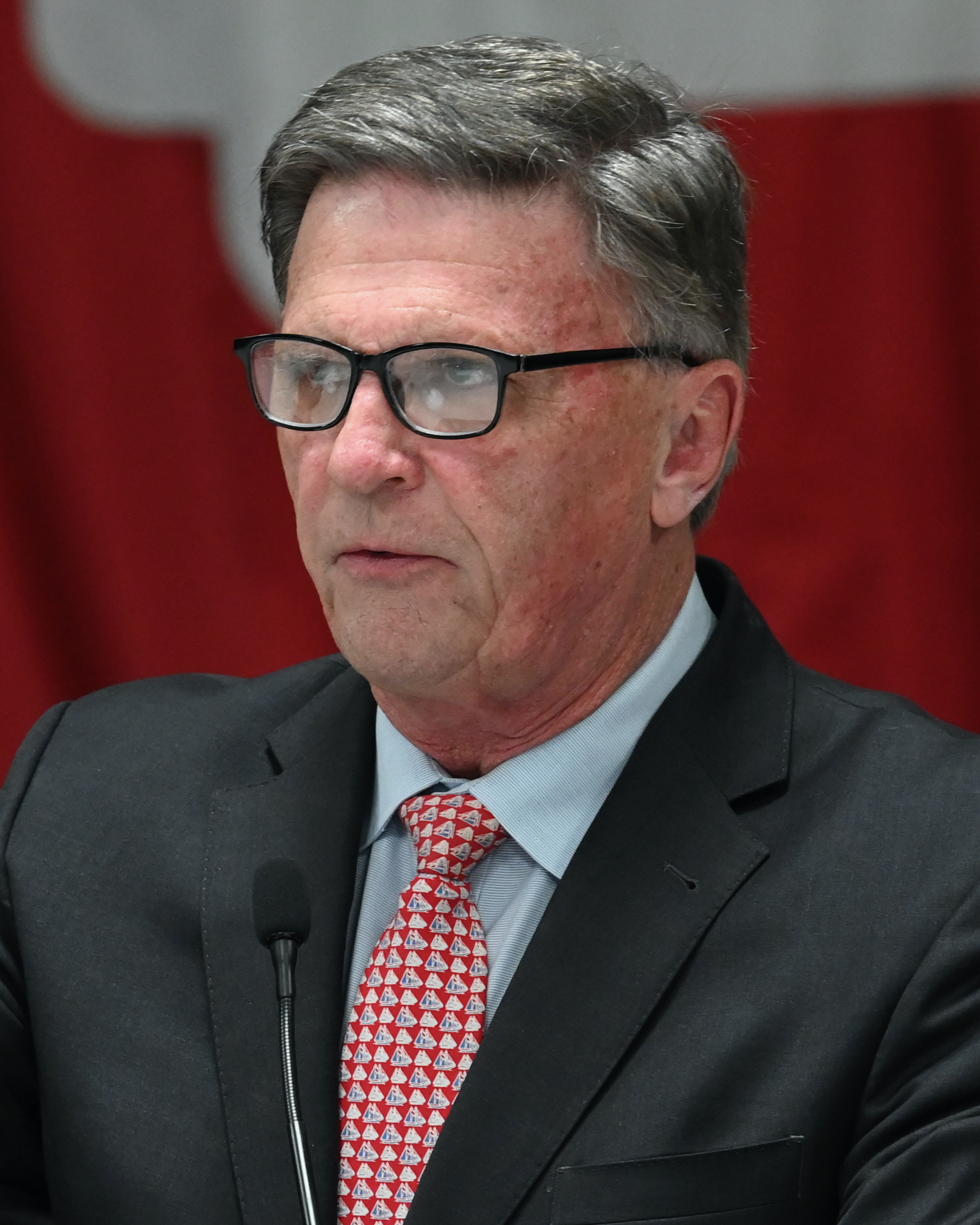
60th Governor of Maryland Bob Ehrlich (J.D. 1982)

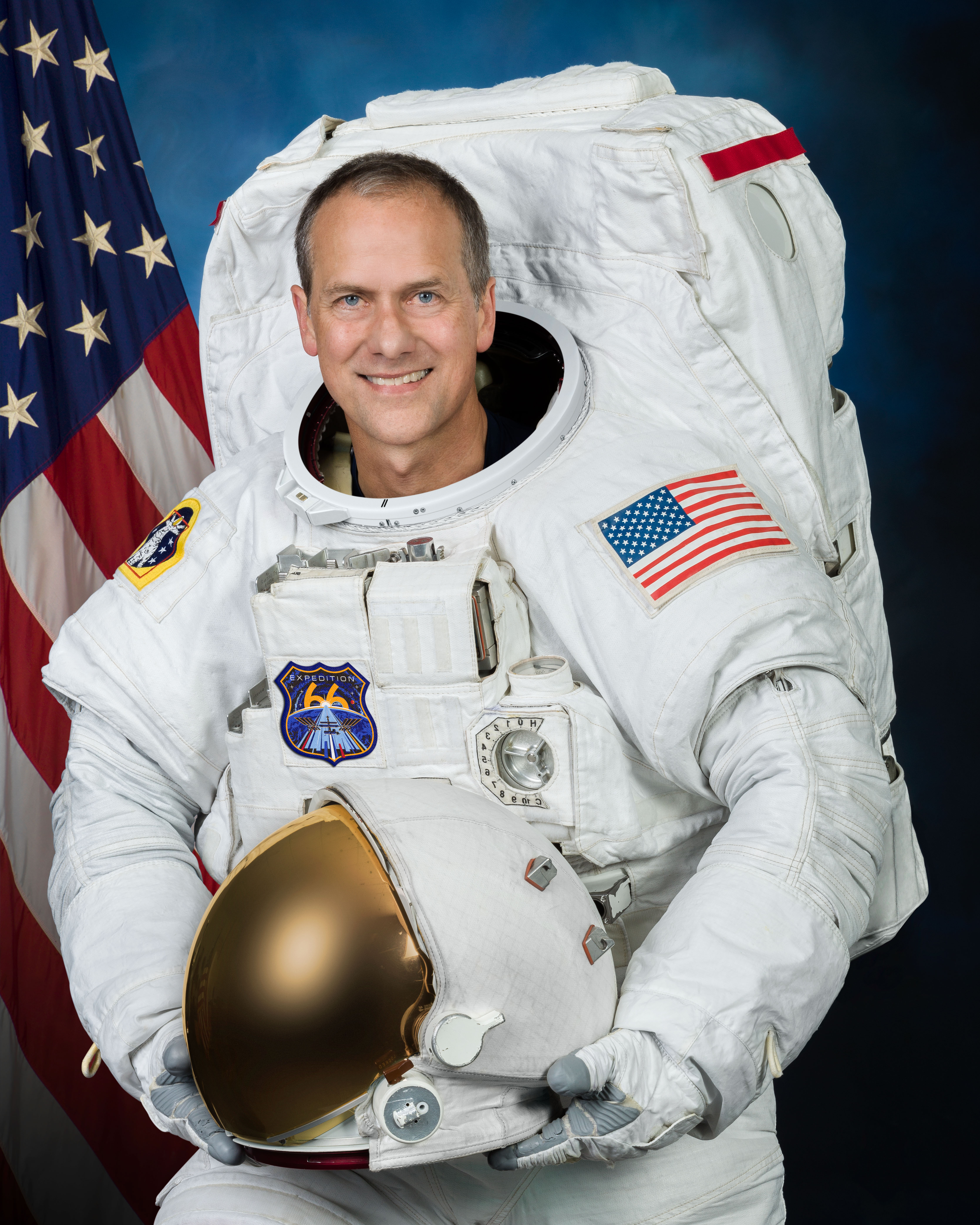
Astronaut Thomas Marshburn (M.D. 1989)

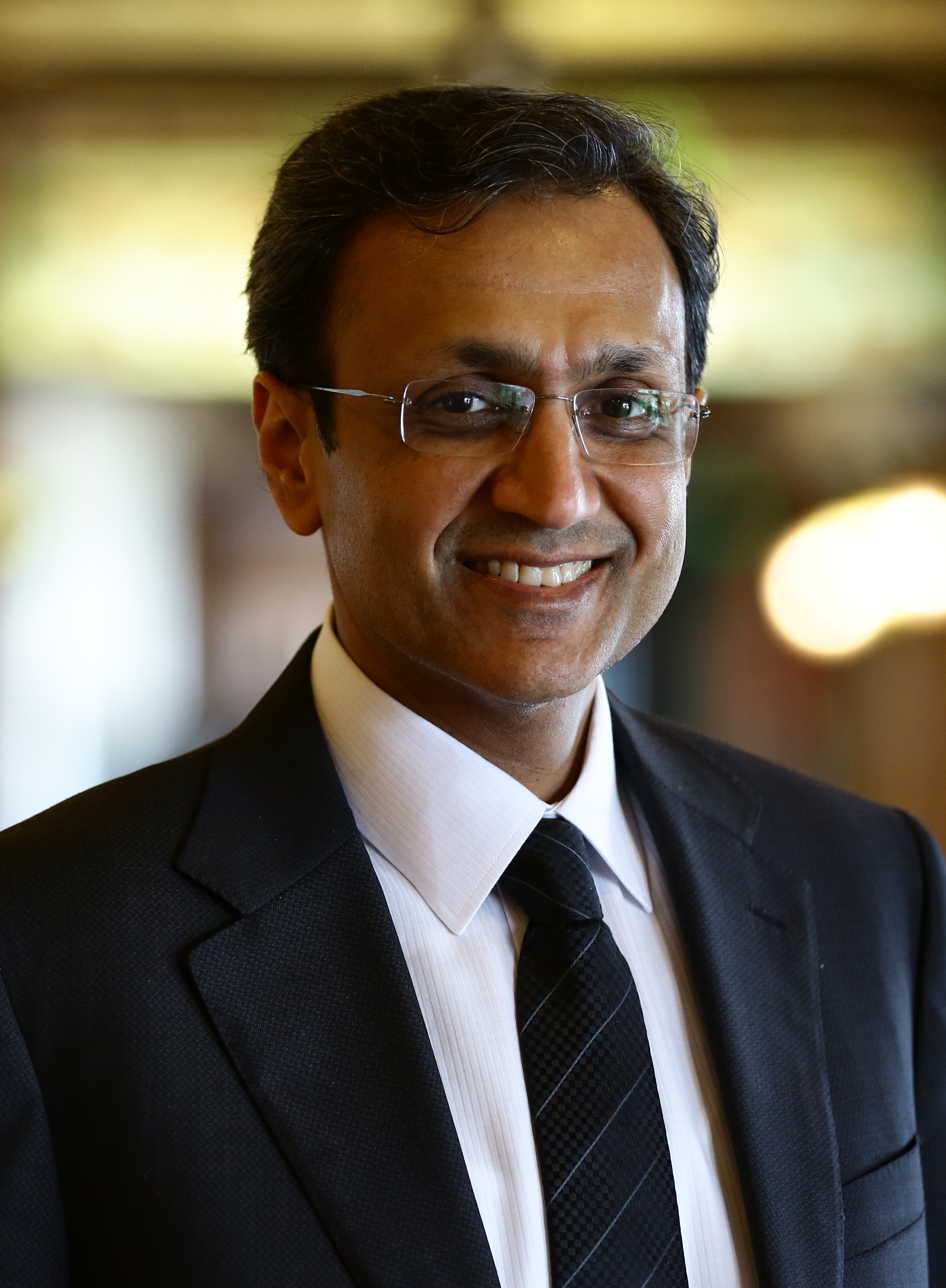
Indian billionaire, chairman and managing director of Havells Anil Rai Gupta (M.B.A. 1992)

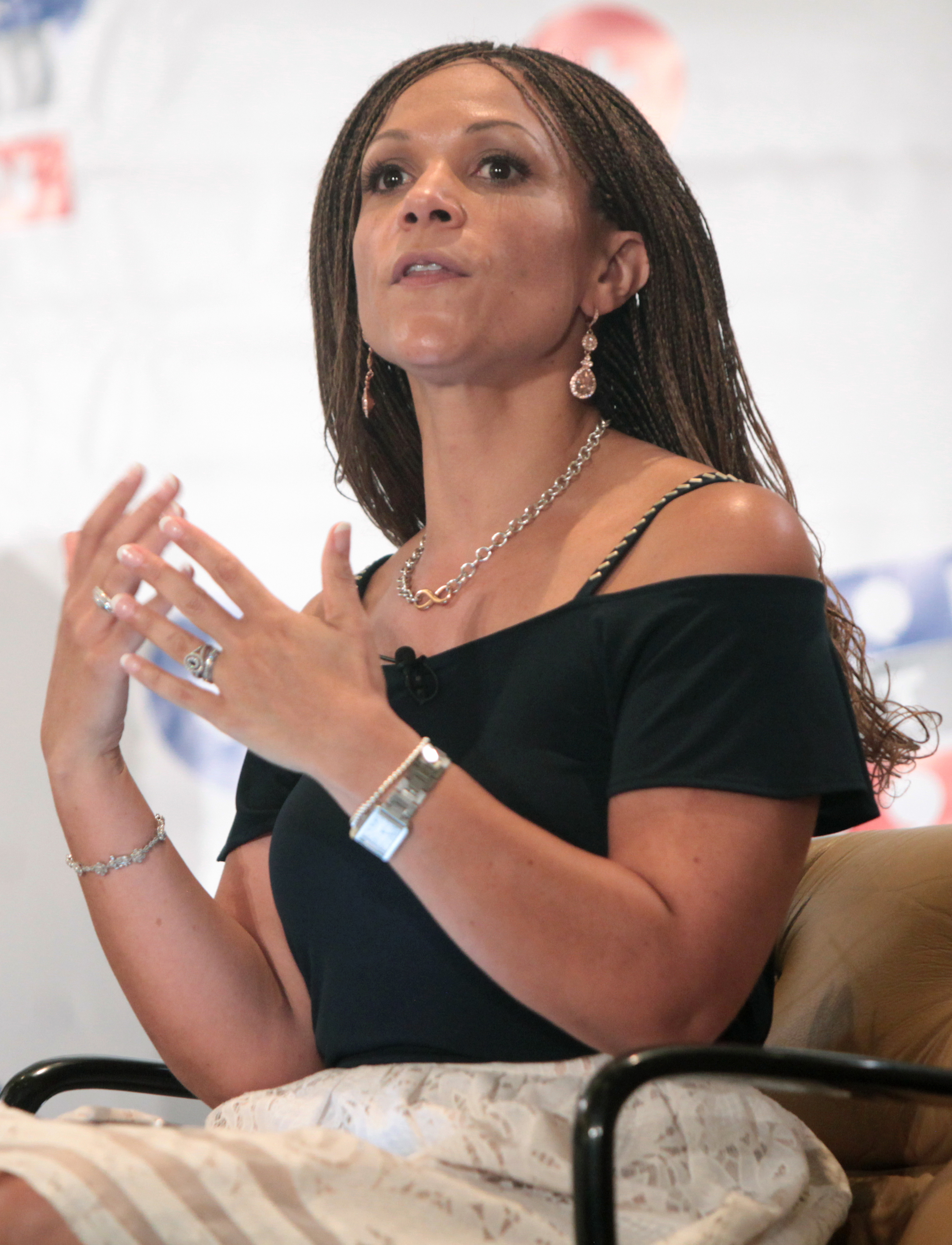
writer & professor Melissa Harris-Perry (B.A. 1994)

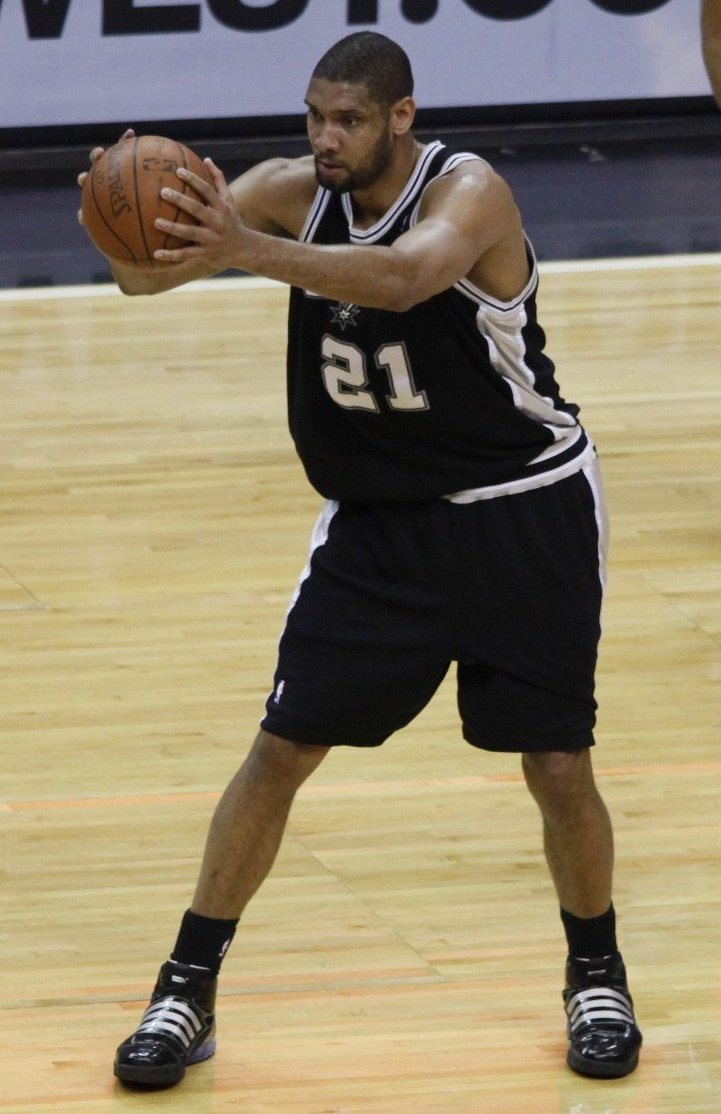
5x NBA champion, 2x NBA MVP, 15x NBA All-star, Naismith Memorial Basketball Hall of Fame member Tim Duncan (B.A. 1997)

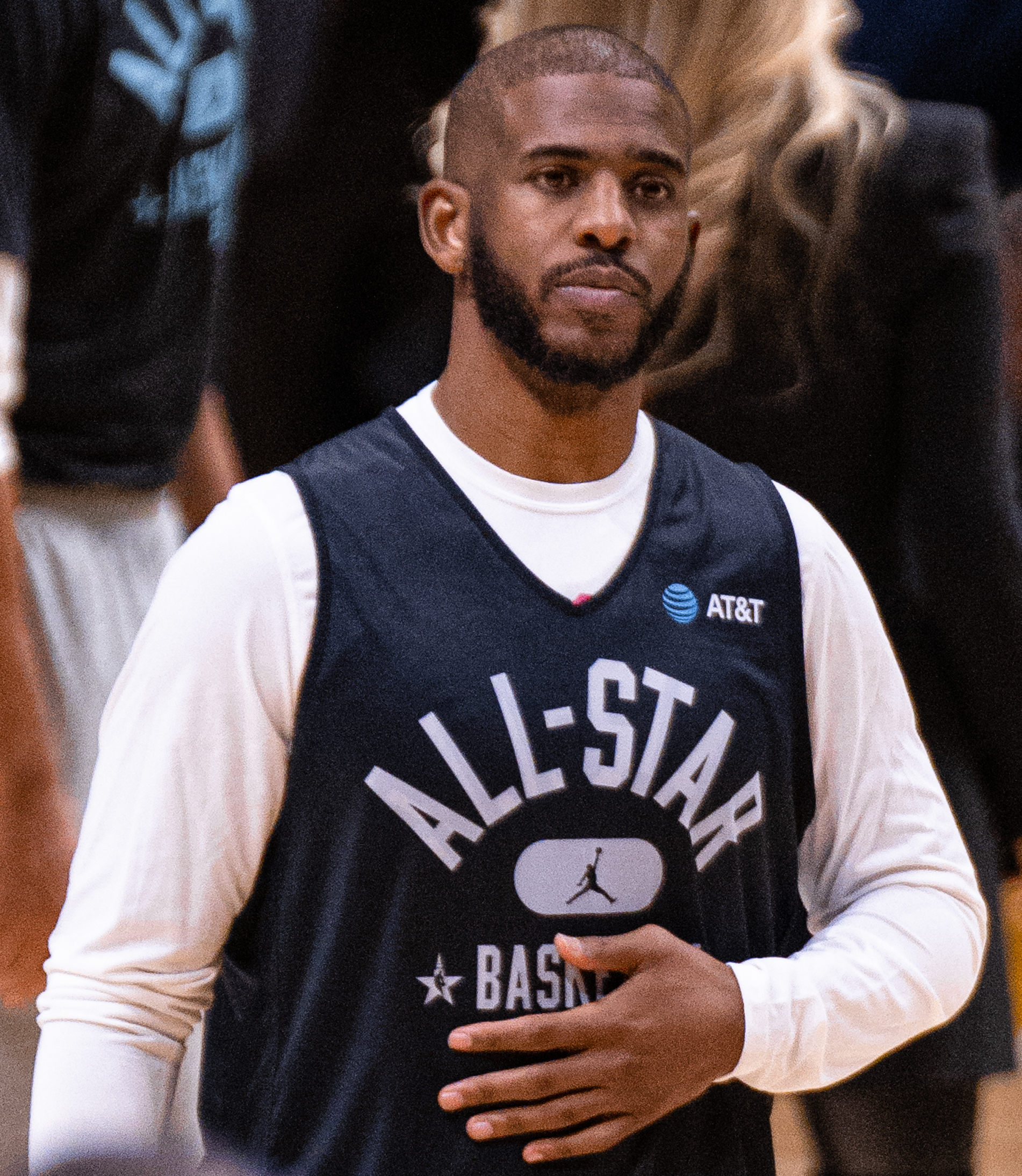
12x NBA All-Star and member of NBA 75th Anniversary Team Chris Paul (2003–2005)

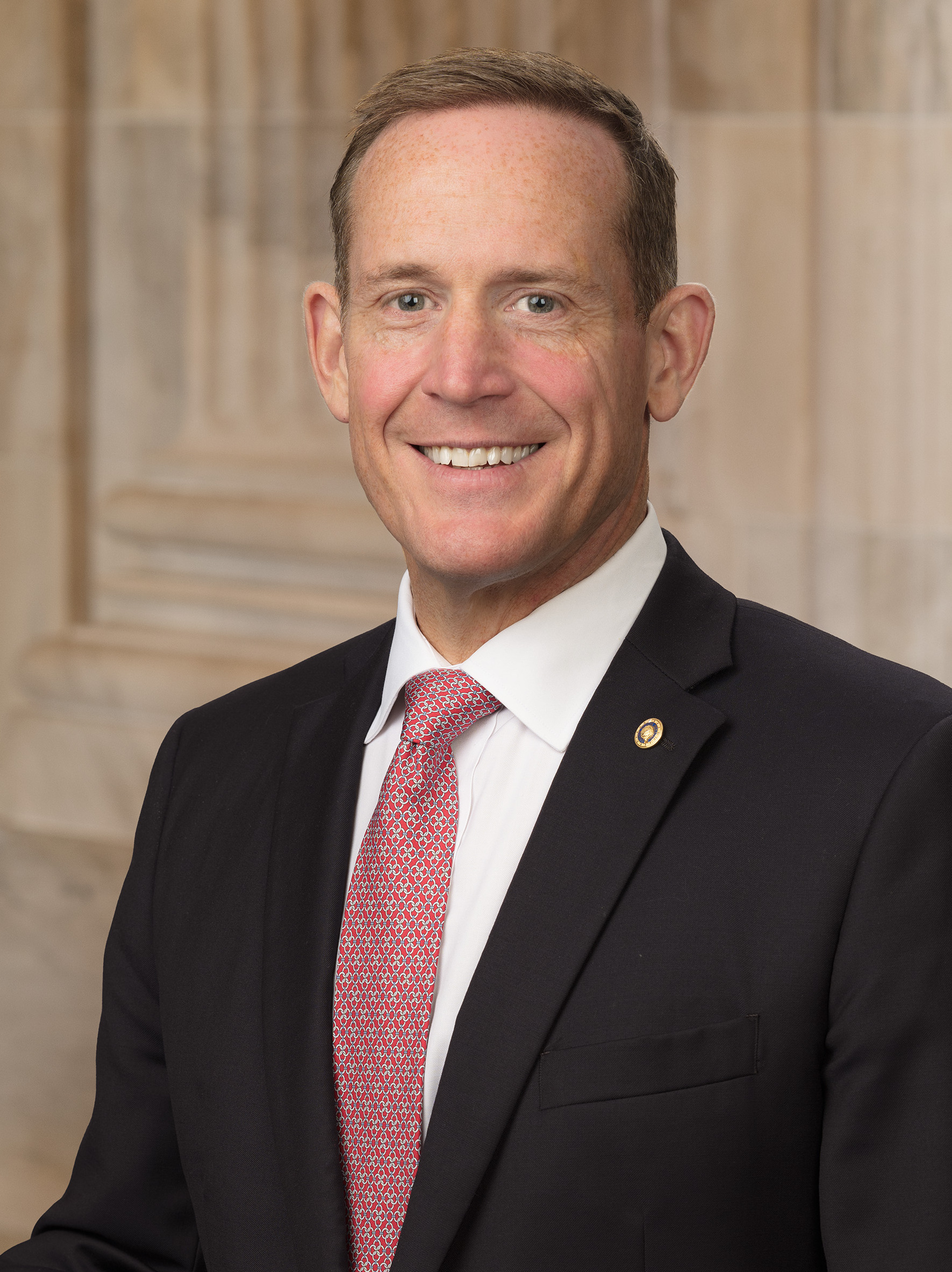
United States Senator from North Carolina Ted Budd (M.B.A. 2007)

== In popular culture ==
Wake Forest has been featured in films including:

- A Union in Wait (2001)
- The 5th Quarter (2010)
- The Longest Ride (2015)

== See also ==
- Education in North Carolina
- List of Wake Forest University people
- Southern Ivy
- Varsity Blues scandal
- Wake Forest Baptist Church
- Wake Forest University Press
