= 1988 United States presidential debates =

Part of the 1988 U.S. presidential election

- September 25, 1988; October 13, 1988

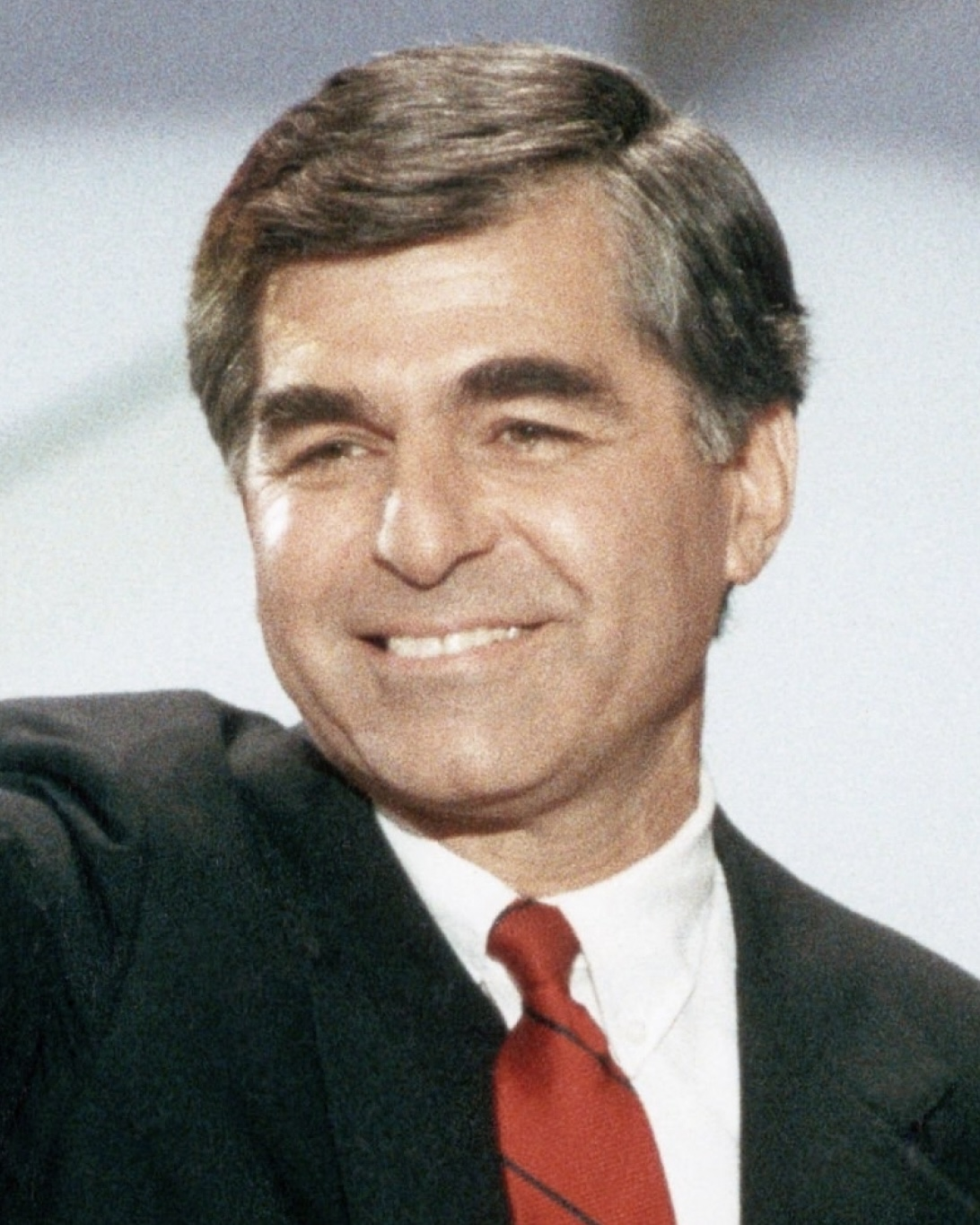
Nominee	George H. W. Bush	Michael Dukakis
Party	Republican	Democratic
Home state	Texas	Massachusetts
- 1988 United States vice presidential debate
- October 5, 1988
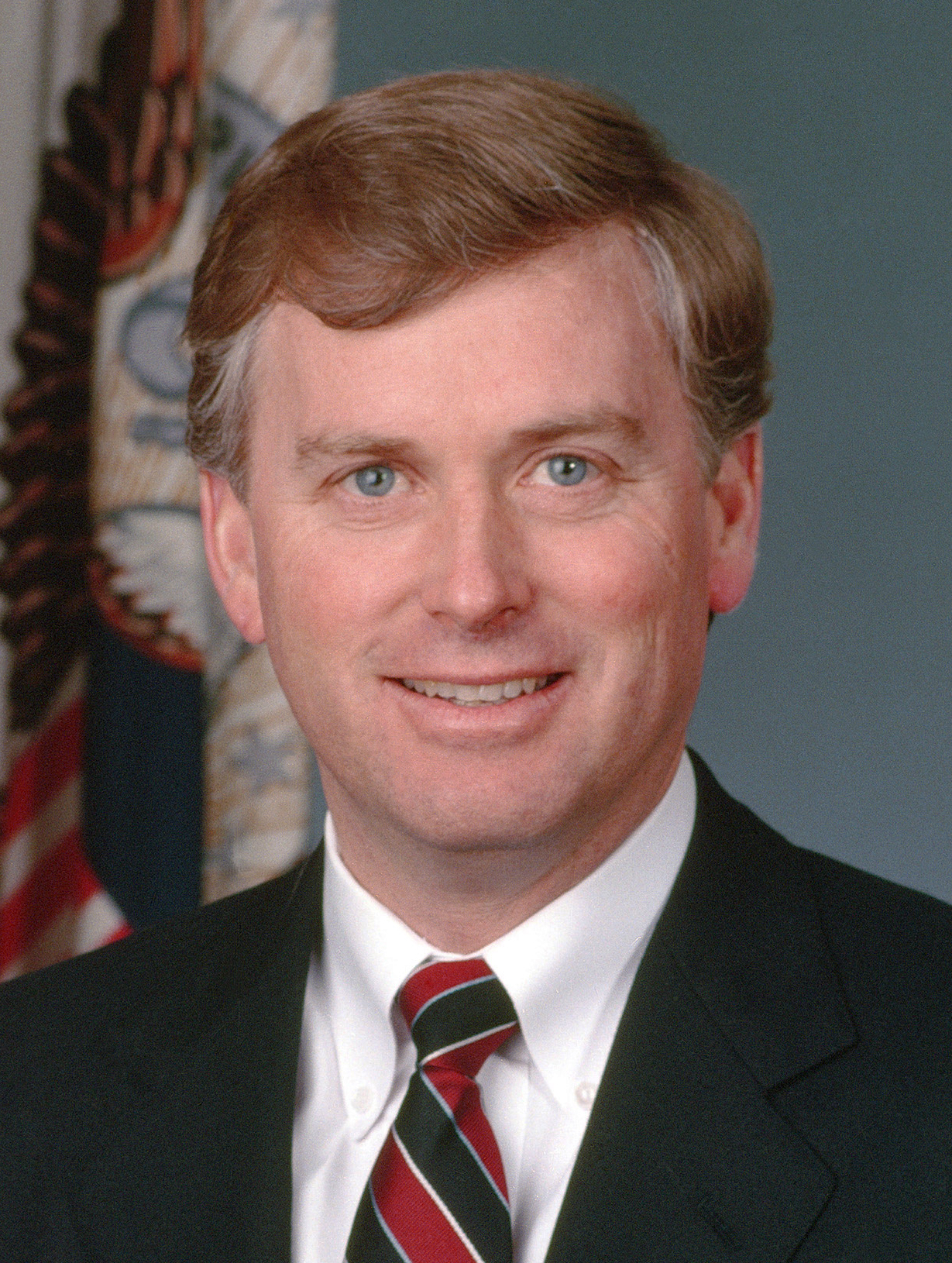

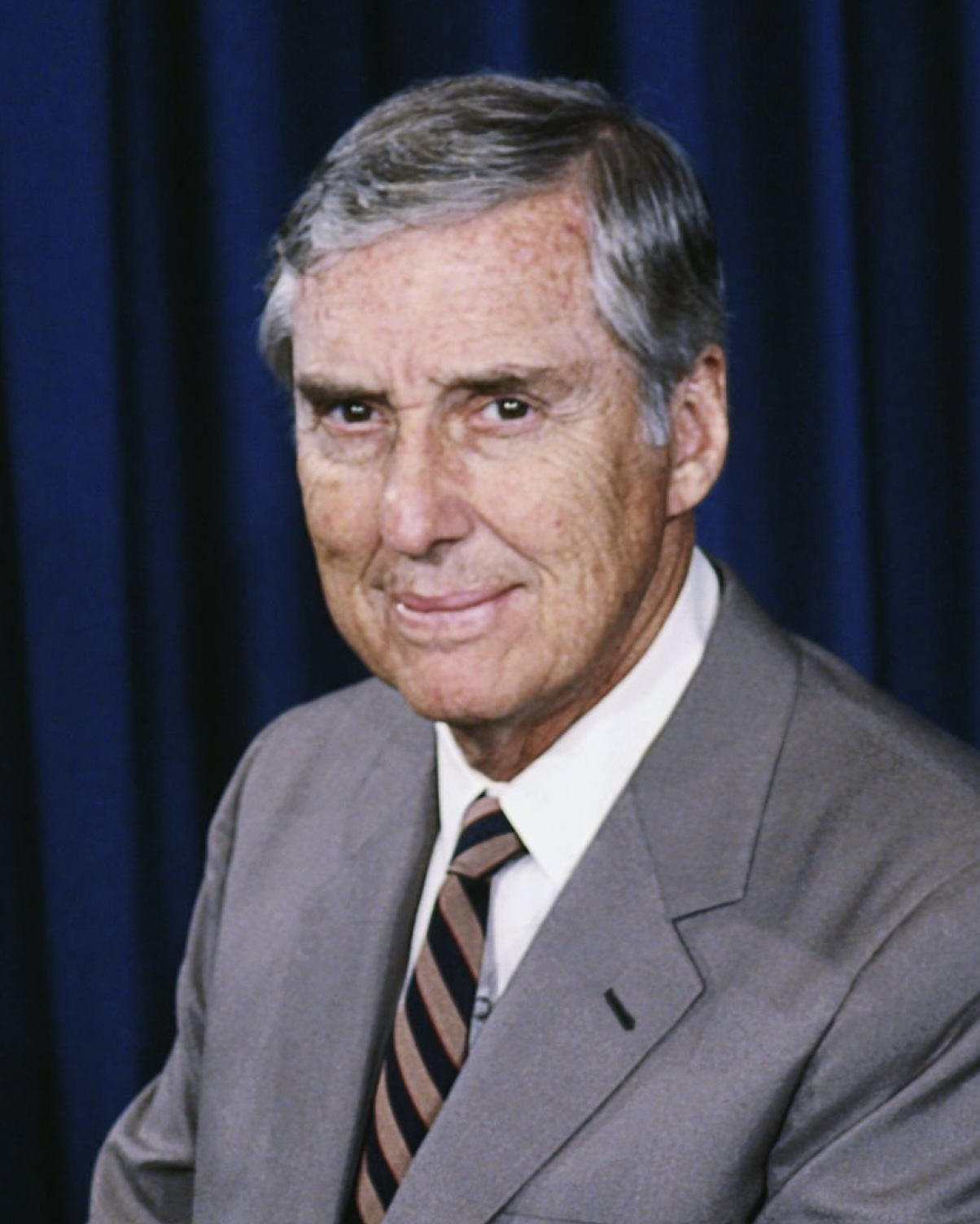
Nominee	Dan Quayle	Lloyd Bentsen
Party	Republican	Democratic
Home state	Indiana	Texas

The 1988 United States presidential debates were a series of debates held during the 1988 presidential election.

The Commission on Presidential Debates (CPD), a bipartisan organization formed in 1987, organized two debates among the major party candidates, sponsored two presidential debates and one vice presidential debates. Only Republican nominee George H. W. Bush and Democratic nominee Michael Dukakis met the criteria for inclusion in the debates, and thus were the only two to appear in the debates sponsored by the Commission on Presidential Debates. The CPD-sponsored vice presidential debate took place between their respective vice presidential running mates, Dan Quayle and Lloyd Bentsen.

== Debate schedule ==
There were two presidential debates and one vice-presidential debate.

1988 United States presidential election debates
No.	Date & Time	Host	Location	Moderator	Participants	
Key: P Participant. N Non-invitee.					Republican	Democratic
Key: P Participant. N Non-invitee.					Vice President George H. W. Bush of Texas	Governor Michael Dukakis of Massachusetts
1	Sunday, September 25, 1988, 8:00 – 9:30 p.m. EDT	Wake Forest University	Winston-Salem, North Carolina	Jim Lehrer of PBS	P	P
2	Thursday, October 13, 1988, 9:30 – 11:00 p.m. EDT	University of California	Los Angeles, California	Bernard Shaw of CNN	P	P
1988 United States vice presidential debate
No.	Date & Time	Host	Location	Moderator	Participants	
Key: P Participant. N Non-invitee.					Republican	Democratic
Key: P Participant. N Non-invitee.					Senator Dan Quayle of Indiana	Senator Lloyd Bentsen of Texas
VP	Wednesday, October 5, 1988, 9:00 – 10:30 p.m. EDT	Omaha Civic Auditorium	Omaha, Nebraska	Judy Woodruff of PBS	P	P

== September 25: First presidential debate (Wake Forest University) ==
First presidential debate
- Date(s): September 25, 1988
- Duration: 90 minutes
- Venue: Wait Chapel at Wake Forest University
- Location: Winston-Salem, North Carolina
- Participants: George H. W. Bush; Michael Dukakis
- Moderator(s): Jim Lehrer of PBS

The first presidential debate between Vice President George H. W. Bush and Governor Michael Dukakis took place on Sunday September 25, 1988, in the Wait Chapel at Wake Forest University.

The debate was moderated by Jim Lehrer of PBS with John Mashek of Atlanta Constitution, Peter Jennings of ABC, and Anne Groer of Orlando Sentinel as panelists. Questions divided between foreign and domestic policy.

Voters were split as to who won the first presidential debate.

=== Transcript ===
- from the Commission on Presidential Debates website.

=== Viewership ===
An estimated 65.1 million viewers tuned into the debate.

== October 5: Vice presidential debate (Omaha Civic Auditorium) ==
Vice presidential debate
- Date(s): October 5, 1988
- Duration: 90 minutes
- Venue: Omaha Civic Auditorium
- Location: Omaha, Nebraska
- Participants: Dan Quayle; Lloyd Bentsen
- Moderator(s): Judy Woodruff of PBS

The only vice presidential debate between Senator Dan Quayle and Senator Lloyd Bentsen took place on Wednesday, October 5, 1988, in the Omaha Civic Auditorium in Omaha, Nebraska.

The debate was moderated by Judy Woodruff of PBS, Tom Brokaw of NBC, Jon Margolis of Chicago Tribune, and Brit Hume of ABC.

=== "Senator, you're no Jack Kennedy" ===
Judy Woodruff set the stage by addressing the audience: "Based on the history since World War II, there is almost a 50–50 chance that one of the two men here tonight will become President of the United States." She was referring to the probability that the man elected vice president would later become president, either by succession or by a presidential bid. In Quayle's response to Woodruff's question he stated "I have as much experience in the Congress as Jack Kennedy did when he sought the presidency." Bentsen then responded to Quayle's remark with "Senator, I served with Jack Kennedy. I knew Jack Kennedy. Jack Kennedy was a friend of mine. Senator, you're no Jack Kennedy,'' which was followed by shouts and applause.

Quayle had routinely been comparing himself to Kennedy in his stump speech. Quayle did not directly compare himself with Kennedy in terms of accomplishment, but in terms of length of Congressional service; Quayle served for 12 years while Kennedy served for 14. When Kennedy successfully sought the Democratic nomination in 1960, he had less experience than his primary opponents, most of whom had more seniority in the Senate. While it was a statement of fact, some of Quayle's advisors suggested that this comparison could cause trouble.

Bentsen's remark has become a part of the political lexicon as a way to deflate politicians or other individuals perceived as thinking too highly of themselves. The phrase was almost never uttered, as Bentsen was so nervous that he pleaded with his staff to cancel the debate altogether.

=== Transcript ===
- from the Commission on Presidential Debates website.

=== Viewership ===
An estimated 46.9 million viewers tuned into the debate.

== October 13: Second presidential debate (University of California) ==
Second presidential debate
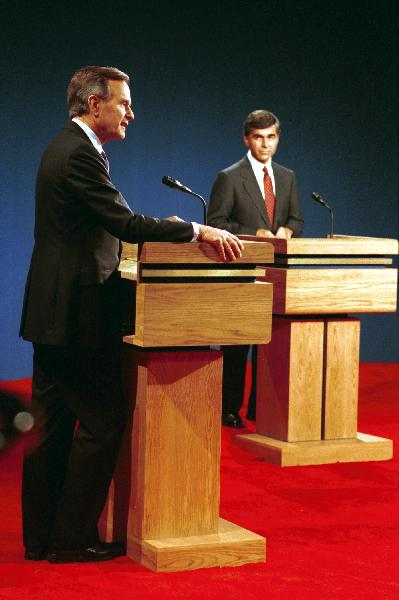
- Date(s): October 13, 1988
- Duration: 90 minutes
- Venue: University of California
- Location: Los Angeles, California
- Participants: George H. W. Bush; Michael Dukakis
- Moderator(s): Bernard Shaw of CNN

The second and final presidential debate between Vice President George H. W. Bush and Governor Michael Dukakis took place on Thursday, October 13, 1988, at the Pauley Pavilion at University of California in Los Angeles, California.

The debate was moderated by Bernard Shaw of CNN with Andrea Mitchell of NBC, Ann Compton of ABC, and Margaret Warner of Newsweek as panelists.

Bush improved in the second debate; Dukakis had been suffering from the flu and spent much of the day in bed. His performance was generally seen as poor.

=== Kitty Dukakis ===
Bernard Shaw opened the debate by asking Dukakis whether he would support the death penalty if Kitty Dukakis, his wife, were raped and murdered; Dukakis answered "no" and proceeded to discuss the statistical ineffectiveness of capital punishment. Some commentators thought the question itself was unfair, in that it injected an overly emotional element into the discussion of a policy issue; Many observers felt Dukakis's answer lacked the normal emotions one would expect of a person talking about a loved one's rape and murder, which played to his reputation of being intellectually cold.

=== Results ===
Tom Brokaw of NBC reported on his October 14 newscast, "The consensus tonight is that Vice President George Bush won last night's debate and made it all the harder for Governor Michael Dukakis to catch and pass him in the 25 days remaining. In all of the Friday morning quarterbacking, there was common agreement that Dukakis failed to seize the debate and make it his night."

=== Transcript ===
- from the Commission on Presidential Debates website.

=== Viewership ===
An estimated 67.3 million viewers tuned into the debate.

== See also ==
- George H. W. Bush 1988 presidential campaign
- Michael Dukakis 1988 presidential campaign
- 1988 United States presidential election
