= 2000 United States presidential debates =

Part of the 2000 U.S. presidential election

- October 3, 2000; October 11, 2000; October 17, 2000

Nominee	Al Gore	George W. Bush
Party	Democratic	Republican
Home state	Tennessee	Texas
- 2000 United States vice presidential debate
- October 5, 2000
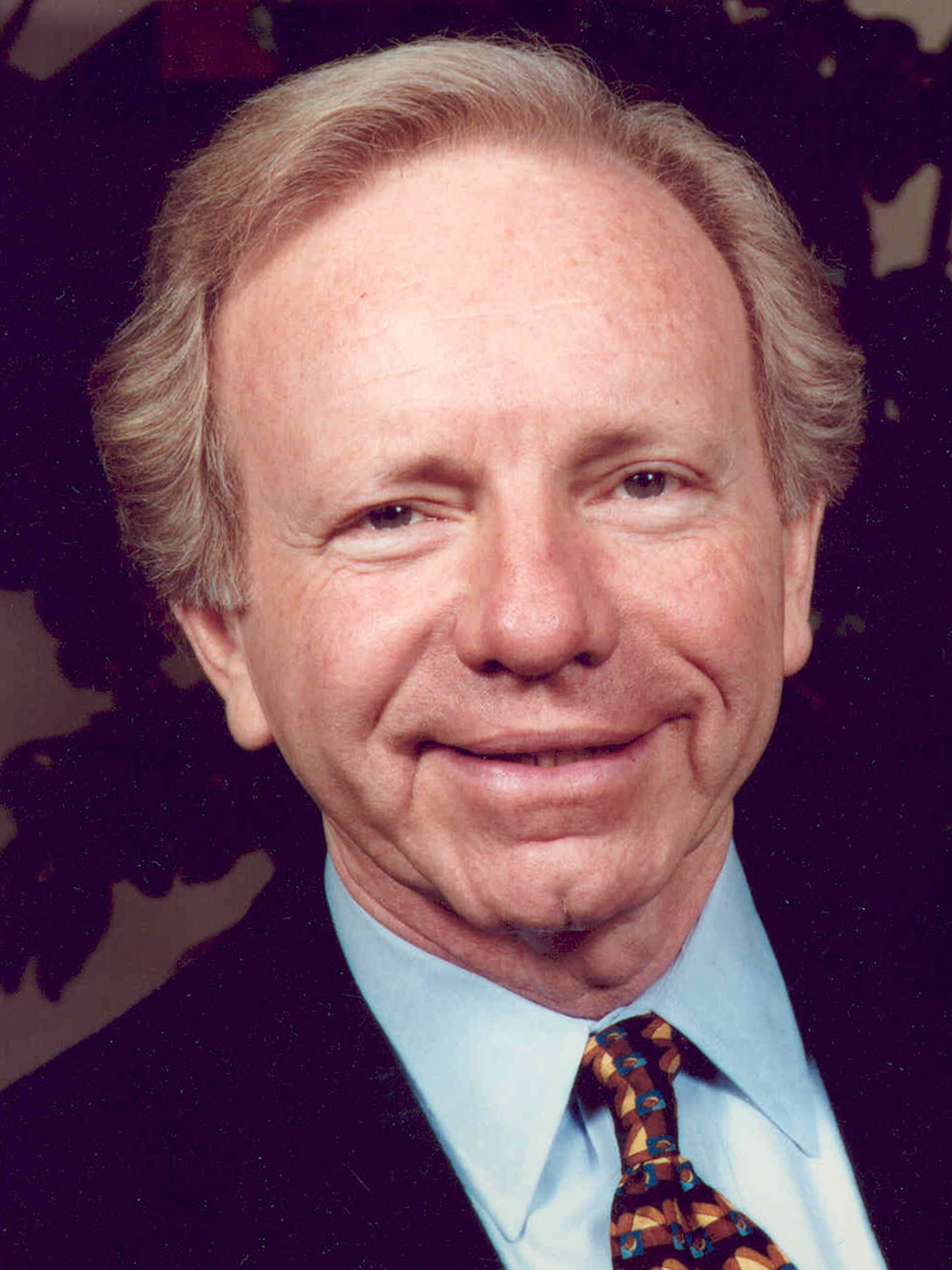

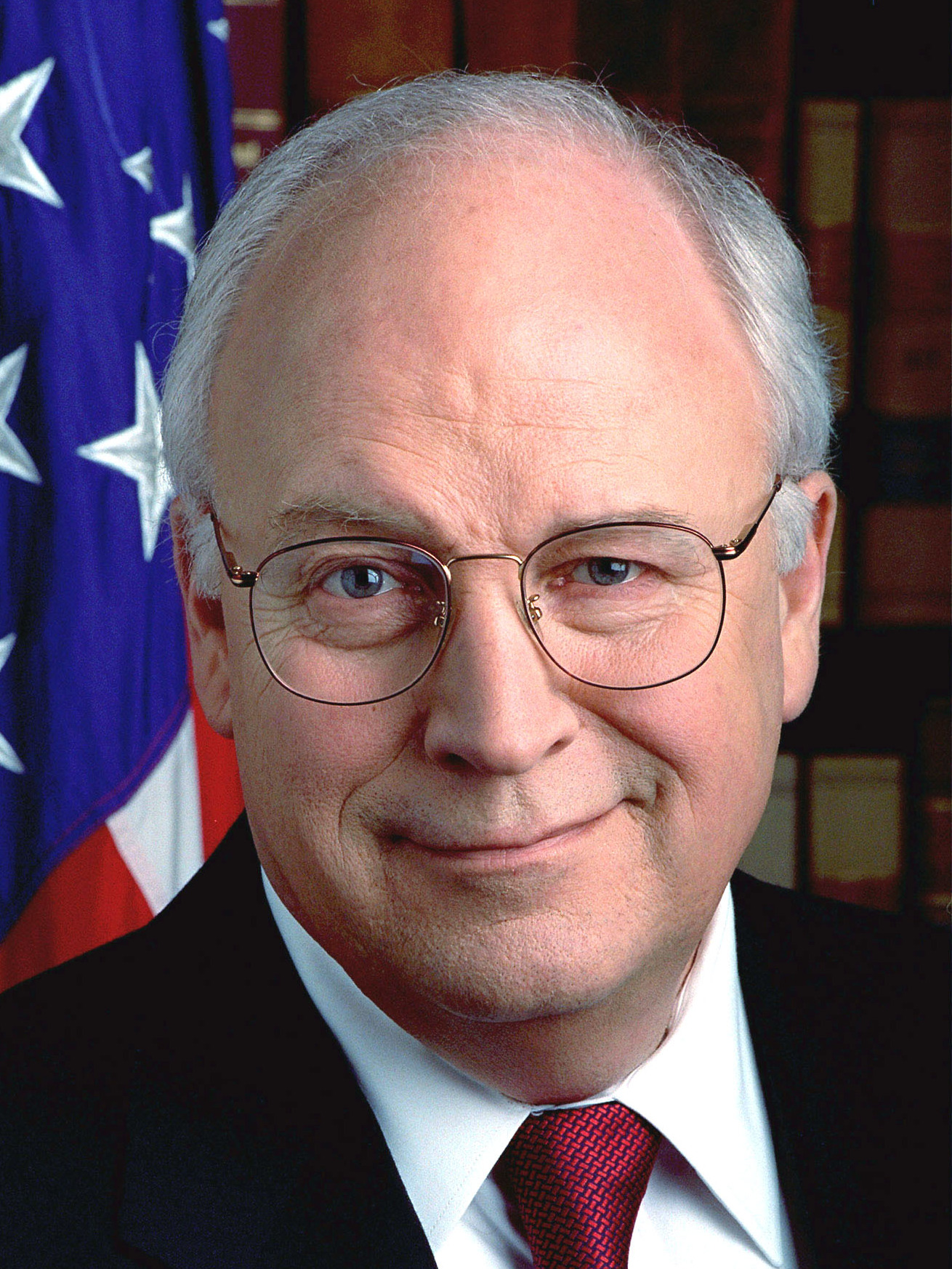
Nominee	Joe Lieberman	Dick Cheney
Party	Democratic	Republican
Home state	Connecticut	Wyoming

The 2000 United States presidential debates were a series of debates held during the 2000 presidential election.

The Commission on Presidential Debates (CPD), a bipartisan organization formed in 1987, organized four debates among the major party candidates, sponsored three presidential debates and one vice presidential debate. Only Democratic nominee Al Gore and Republican nominee George W. Bush met the criteria for inclusion in the debates, and thus were the only two to appear in the debates sponsored by the Commission on Presidential Debates. The CPD-sponsored vice presidential debate took place between their respective vice presidential running mates, Joe Lieberman and Dick Cheney.

== Debate schedule ==
No.	Date & time	Host	Location	Moderator	Participants	
Key: P Participant N Non-invitee					Democratic	Republican
Key: P Participant N Non-invitee					Vice President Al Gore of Tennessee	Governor George W. Bush of Texas
1	Tuesday, October 3, 2000; 9:00 – 10:30 p.m. EDT	University of Massachusetts	Boston, Massachusetts	Jim Lehrer of PBS	P	P
2	Wednesday, October 11, 2000; 9:00 – 10:30 p.m. EDT	Wake Forest University	Winston-Salem, North Carolina	Jim Lehrer of PBS	P	P
3	Tuesday, October 17, 2000; 9:00 – 10:30 p.m. EDT	Washington University in St. Louis	St. Louis, Missouri	Jim Lehrer of PBS	P	P
2000 United States vice presidential debate
No.	Date & time	Host	Location	Moderator	Participants	
Key: P Participant N Non-invitee					Democratic	Republican
Key: P Participant N Non-invitee					Senator Joe Lieberman of Connecticut	Secretary Dick Cheney of Wyoming
VP	Thursday, October 5, 2000; 9:00 – 10:30 p.m. EDT	Centre College	Danville, Kentucky	Bernard Shaw of CNN	P	P

== Participant selection ==
In 2000, the following eight candidates achieved ballot access in enough states to mathematically win the election via the Electoral College:

Presidential candidate	Party	Ballot access
George W. Bush	Republican	50+DC
Al Gore	Democratic	50+DC
Harry Browne	Libertarian	49+DC
Pat Buchanan	Reform	49
Ralph Nader	Green	43+DC
Howard Phillips	Constitution	41
John Hagelin	Natural Law	38

Responding to criticism received from the exclusion of Ross Perot in the 1996 campaign, the Commission on Presidential Debates adjusted the criteria used to invite candidates, announcing on January 6, 2000 that third-party candidates would have to reach 15 percent in pre-debate polls to receive an invitation.

Only Governor George W. Bush and Vice President Al Gore met the CPD selection criteria for any of the presidential debates. As a result, only Dick Cheney and Joe Lieberman met the criteria for the vice presidential debate.

Bush initially refused to participate in all three CPD debates, instead proposing that he and Gore meet for just one CPD-sponsored debate, and another two debates of one hour each, hosted on Meet the Press and Larry King Live. However, the Bush campaign eventually assented to the three Commission-scheduled debates.

== October 3: First presidential debate (University of Massachusetts Boston) ==
First presidential debate
- Date(s): October 3, 2000
- Duration: 90 minutes
- Venue: University of Massachusetts Boston
- Location: Boston, Massachusetts
- Participants: Al Gore; George W. Bush
- Moderator(s): Jim Lehrer of PBS

The first presidential debate between Vice President Al Gore and Governor George W. Bush took place on Tuesday, October 3, 2000, in the Clark Athletic Center on the campus of the University of Massachusetts Boston in Boston, Massachusetts.

The debate was moderated by Jim Lehrer of PBS' The NewsHour, who posed the questions for each candidate. In the debate, Bush used the term "fuzzy math" for the first time.

=== Transcript ===
- Debate transcript from the Commission on Presidential Debates website.

=== Viewership ===
An estimated 46.6 million viewers tuned into the debates.

== October 5: Vice presidential debate (Centre College) ==
Vice presidential debate
- Date(s): October 5, 2000
- Duration: 90 minutes
- Venue: Centre College
- Location: Danville, Kentucky
- Participants: Joe Lieberman; Dick Cheney
- Moderator(s): Bernard Shaw of CNN

The only vice presidential debate between Senator Joe Lieberman and former Secretary of Defense Dick Cheney, took place on Thursday, October 5, 2000, in the Norton Center for the Arts on the campus of Centre College in Danville, Kentucky.

The debate was moderated by Bernard Shaw of CNN, who posed the questions for each candidate. The candidates discussed issues such as Medicare, Social Security, economic issues, the surplus, the future of the U.S. military and its decline of morale, and drugs in school and education reform.

Reflecting on the debate in 2016, Lieberman called it one of his proudest moments of the campaign, citing the debate's civil tone.

=== Transcript ===
- Debate transcript from the Commission on Presidential Debates website.

=== Viewership ===
An estimated 28.5 million viewers tuned into the debate.

== October 11: Second presidential debate (Wake Forest University) ==
Second presidential debate
- Date(s): October 11, 2000
- Duration: 90 minutes
- Venue: Wake Forest University
- Location: Winston-Salem, North Carolina
- Participants: Al Gore; George W. Bush
- Moderator(s): Jim Lehrer of PBS

The second presidential debate between Vice President Al Gore, took place on Wednesday, October 11, 2000, in the Wait Chapel on the campus of the Wake Forest University in Winston-Salem, North Carolina.

The debate was moderated by Jim Lehrer of PBS' The NewsHour, who posed the questions for each candidate.

=== Transcript ===
- Debate transcript from the Commission on Presidential Debates website.

=== Viewership ===
An estimated 37.5 million viewers tuned into the debate.

== October 17: Third presidential debate (Washington University in St. Louis) ==
Third presidential debate
- Date(s): October 17, 2000
- Duration: 90 minutes
- Venue: Washington University in St. Louis
- Location: St. Louis, Missouri
- Participants: Al Gore; George W. Bush
- Moderator(s): Jim Lehrer of PBS

The third and final presidential debate between Vice President Al Gore and Governor George W. Bush, took place on Tuesday, October 17, 2000, at the Field House on the campus of Washington University in St. Louis, Missouri.

The town hall style debate Jim Lehrer of PBS with featuring questions asked by members of the audience.

=== Transcript ===
- Debate transcript from the Commission on Presidential Debates website.

=== Viewership ===
An estimated 37.7 million viewers tuned into the debate.

== Third-party debates ==
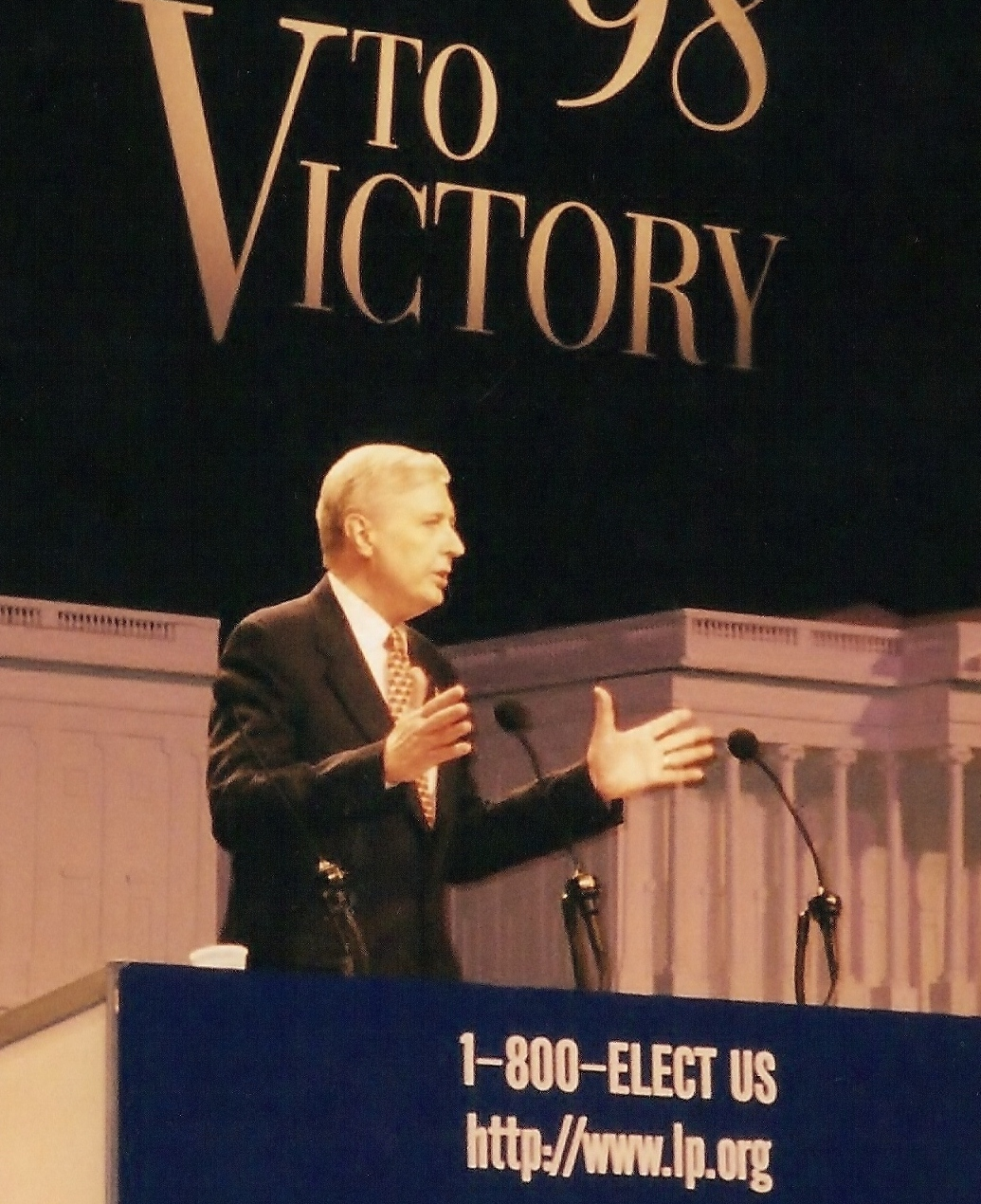
Harry Browne
Tennessee

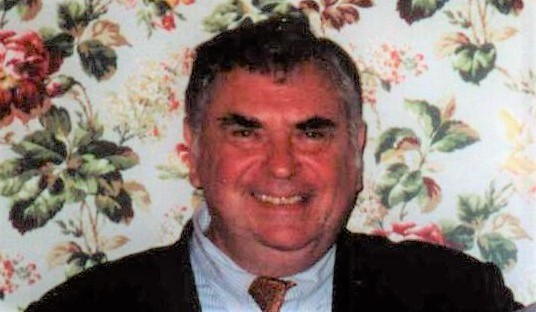
Howard Phillips
Virginia

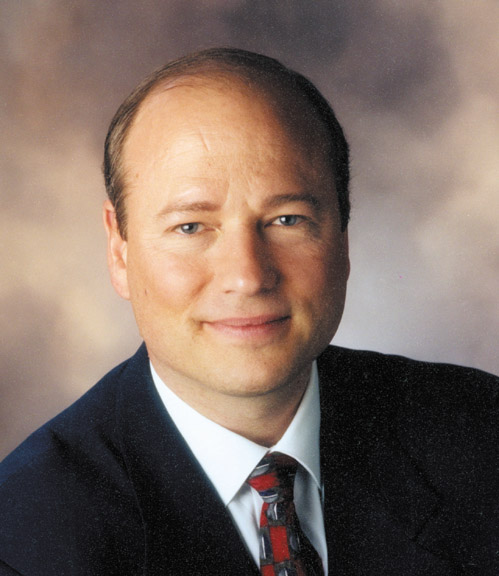
John Hagelin
Iowa

- September 28, 2000 – The Independence Party of Minnesota sponsored a third-party presidential debate moderated by Minnesota Governor Jesse Ventura. In attendance for this debate were Libertarian candidate Harry Browne, Constitution Party candidate Howard Phillips, and Natural Law Party candidate John Hagelin. Both Ralph Nader and Pat Buchanan declined invitations to attend.
- October 20, 2000 – Judicial Watch sponsored a third-party presidential debate at the Ronald Reagan Building in Washington, DC, moderated by radio broadcaster Jim Bohannon. Once again, Browne, Phillips, and Hagelin participated while Nader and Buchanan declined invitations.
- November 3, 2000 – American University's Department of History and Commission on Fair Elections sponsored a third-party vice presidential debate at the National Press Club. Participating were vice presidential candidates Art Olivier of the Libertarian Party, Dr. J. Curtis Frazier of the Constitution Party, and Nat Goldhaber representing the Natural Law Party. Winona LaDuke and Ezola Foster of the Green and Reform Parties declined invitations.

== See also ==
- Al Gore 2000 presidential campaign
- George W. Bush 2000 presidential campaign
- 2000 United States presidential election
