= 1976 United States presidential debates =

Part of the 1976 U.S. presidential election

- September 23, 1976; October 6, 1976; October 22, 1976

Nominee	Gerald Ford	Jimmy Carter
Party	Republican	Democratic
Home state	Michigan	Georgia
- 1976 United States vice presidential debate
- October 15, 1976
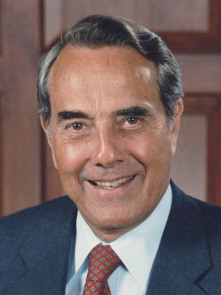

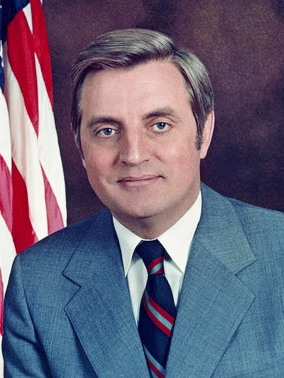
Nominee	Bob Dole	Walter Mondale
Party	Republican	Democratic
Home state	Kansas	Minnesota

The 1976 United States presidential debates were a series of debates held during the 1976 presidential election.

The League of Women Voters organized four debates among the major party candidates, sponsored three presidential debates and one vice presidential debate. Three presidential debates were held between Republican nominee Gerald Ford and Democratic nominee Jimmy Carter. One vice presidential debate was held between their respective vice presidential running mates, Bob Dole and Walter Mondale. In each of the debates, the candidates received questions in turn with three minutes to answer and a 60-second rebuttal.

== Participant selection ==
In 1976 only the two candidates from the major political parties, Gerald Ford and Jimmy Carter, were invited. As a result, only Bob Dole and Walter Mondale met the criteria for the vice presidential debate.

== Debate schedule ==
1976 United States presidential election debates
No.	Date and time	Host	Location	Moderator	Participants	
Key: P Participant					Republican	Democratic
Key: P Participant					President Gerald Ford of Michigan	Governor Jimmy Carter of Georgia
1	Thursday, September 23, 1976; 9:30 – 11:00 p.m. EDT	Walnut Street Theater	Philadelphia, Pennsylvania	Edwin Newman of NBC	P	P
2	Wednesday, October 6, 1976; 9:30 – 11:00 p.m. EDT	Palace of Fine Arts	San Francisco, California	Pauline Frederick of NPR	P	P
3	Friday, October 22, 1976; 9:30 – 11:00 p.m. EDT	College of William & Mary	Williamsburg, Virginia	Barbara Walters of ABC	P	P
1976 United States vice presidential debate
No.	Date and time	Host	Location	Moderator	Participants	
Key: P Participant					Republican	Democratic
Key: P Participant					Senator Bob Dole of Kansas	Senator Walter Mondale of Minnesota
VP	Friday, October 15, 1976; 9:30 – 10:45 p.m. EDT	Alley Theatre	Houston, Texas	James Hoge of Chicago Sun-Times	P	P

Three presidential debates were scheduled by the League of Women Voters:

1. September 23 at the Walnut Street Theater, with questions from moderator Edwin Newman of NBC;
2. October 6 at the Palace of Fine Arts, with questions from moderator Pauline Frederick of NPR;
3. October 22 at the College of William & Mary, with questions from moderator Barbara Walters of ABC;

One vice-presidential debate was held:

- October 15 at the Alley Theatre, moderated by James Hoge of Chicago Sun Times.

== September 23: First presidential debate (Walnut Street Theater) ==
First presidential debate
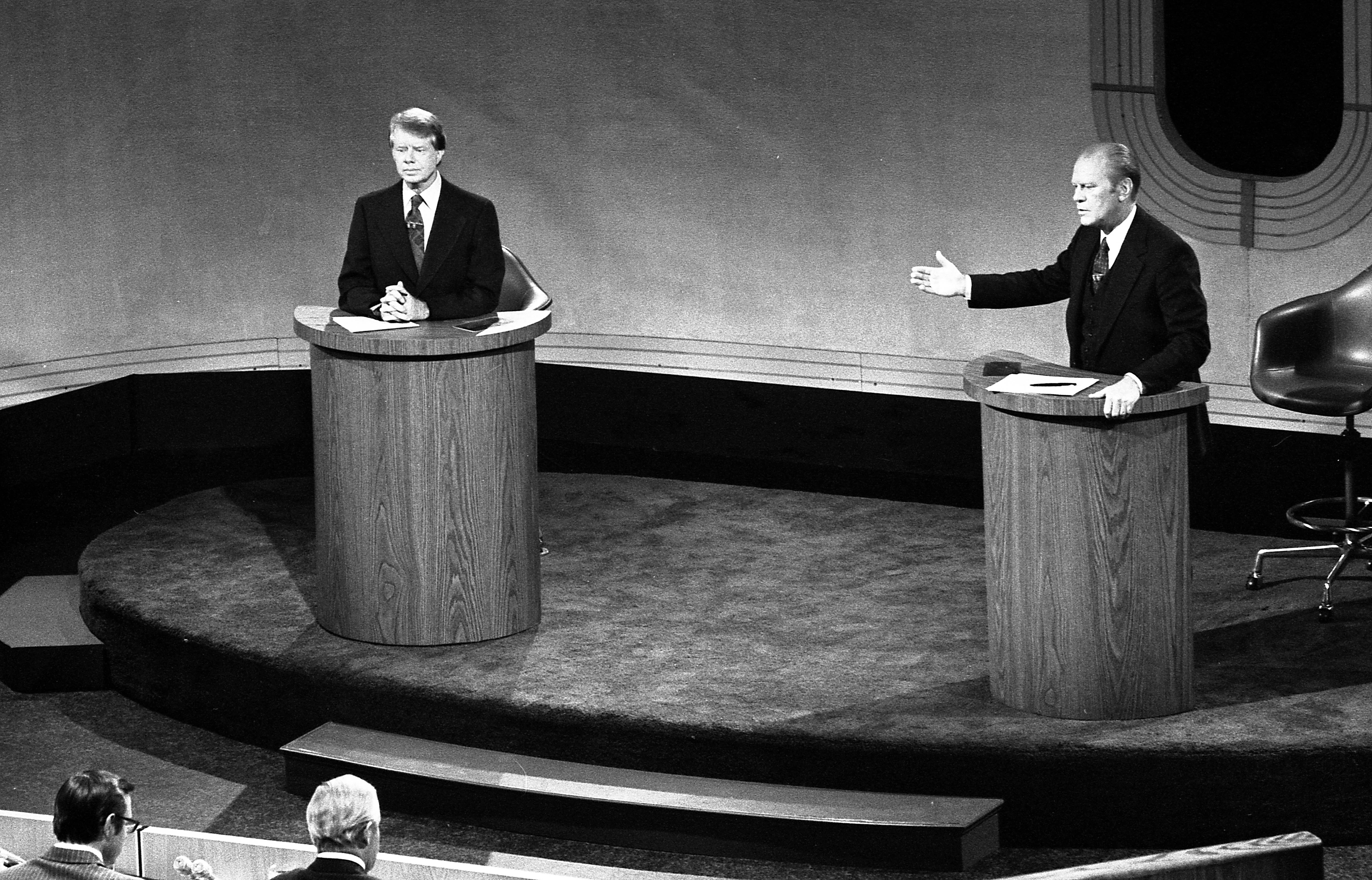
- Date(s): September 23, 1976
- Duration: 90 minutes
- Venue: Walnut Street Theater
- Location: Philadelphia, Pennsylvania
- Participants: Gerald Ford; Jimmy Carter
- Moderator(s): Edwin Newman of NBC

The first presidential debate between President Gerald Ford and former Governor Jimmy Carter took place on Thursday, September 23, 1976, in the Walnut Street Theater in Philadelphia, Pennsylvania.

The debate was moderated by Edwin Newman of NBC, with a panel consisting of Elizabeth Drew, Frank Reynolds and James Gannon posed the questions to each candidate.

This was the first presidential debate in 16 years, and the first such debate to be televised in color. Eighty-one minutes into the broadcast of the 90 minute debate, the sound was lost and the debate was paused for 27 minutes before the problem was fixed and the debate could resume.

=== Video ===
- from PBS NewsHour via YouTube.

=== Transcript ===
- from the Commission on Presidential Debates website.

=== Viewership ===
An estimated 69.7 million viewers tuned into the debates.

== October 6: Second presidential debate (Palace of Fine Arts) ==
Second presidential debate
- Date(s): October 6, 1976
- Duration: 90 minutes
- Venue: Palace of Fine Arts
- Location: San Francisco, California
- Participants: Gerald Ford; Jimmy Carter
- Moderator(s): Pauline Frederick of NPR

The second presidential debate between President Gerald Ford and former Governor Jimmy Carter took place on Wednesday, October 6, 1976, at the Palace of Fine Arts in San Francisco, California.

The debate was moderated by Pauline Frederick of NPR, who posed the questions for each candidate. The debate is infamous for President Ford's gaffe, "There is no Soviet domination of Eastern Europe and there never will be under a Ford administration."

=== Video ===
- from PBS NewsHour via YouTube.

=== Transcript ===
- from the Commission on Presidential Debates website.

=== Viewership ===
An estimated 63.9 million viewers tuned into the debate.

== October 15: Vice presidential debate (Alley Theatre) ==
Vice presidential debate
- Date(s): October 15, 1976
- Duration: 75 minutes
- Venue: Alley Theatre
- Location: Houston, Texas
- Participants: Bob Dole; Walter Mondale
- Moderator(s): James Hoge of Chicago Sun-Times

The only vice presidential debate between Senator Bob Dole and Senator Walter Mondale took place on Friday, October 15, 1976, in the Alley Theatre in Houston, Texas. It was the first vice presidential debate in American history.

James Hoge of Chicago Sun-Times posed the questions for each candidate.

=== Video ===
- from PBS NewsHour via YouTube.

=== Viewership ===
An estimated 43.2 million viewers tuned into the debate.

== October 22: Third presidential debate (College of William & Mary) ==
Third presidential debate
- Date(s): October 22, 1976
- Duration: 90 minutes
- Venue: Phi Beta Kappa Memorial Hall at the College of William & Mary
- Location: Williamsburg, Virginia
- Participants: Gerald Ford; Jimmy Carter
- Moderator(s): Barbara Walters of ABC

The third and final presidential debate between President Gerald Ford and former Governor Jimmy Carter took place on Friday, October 22, 1976, in the Phi Beta Kappa Memorial Hall at the College of William & Mary in Williamsburg, Virginia.

The debate was moderated by Barbara Walters of ABC, who posed the questions for each candidate.

=== Transcript ===
- from the Commission on Presidential Debates website.

=== Viewership ===
An estimated 62.7 million viewers tuned into the debates.

== See also ==
- Gerald Ford 1976 presidential campaign
- Jimmy Carter 1976 presidential campaign
- 1976 United States presidential election
