= United States presidential debates =

Traditional formality of presidential candidates debating prior to the election

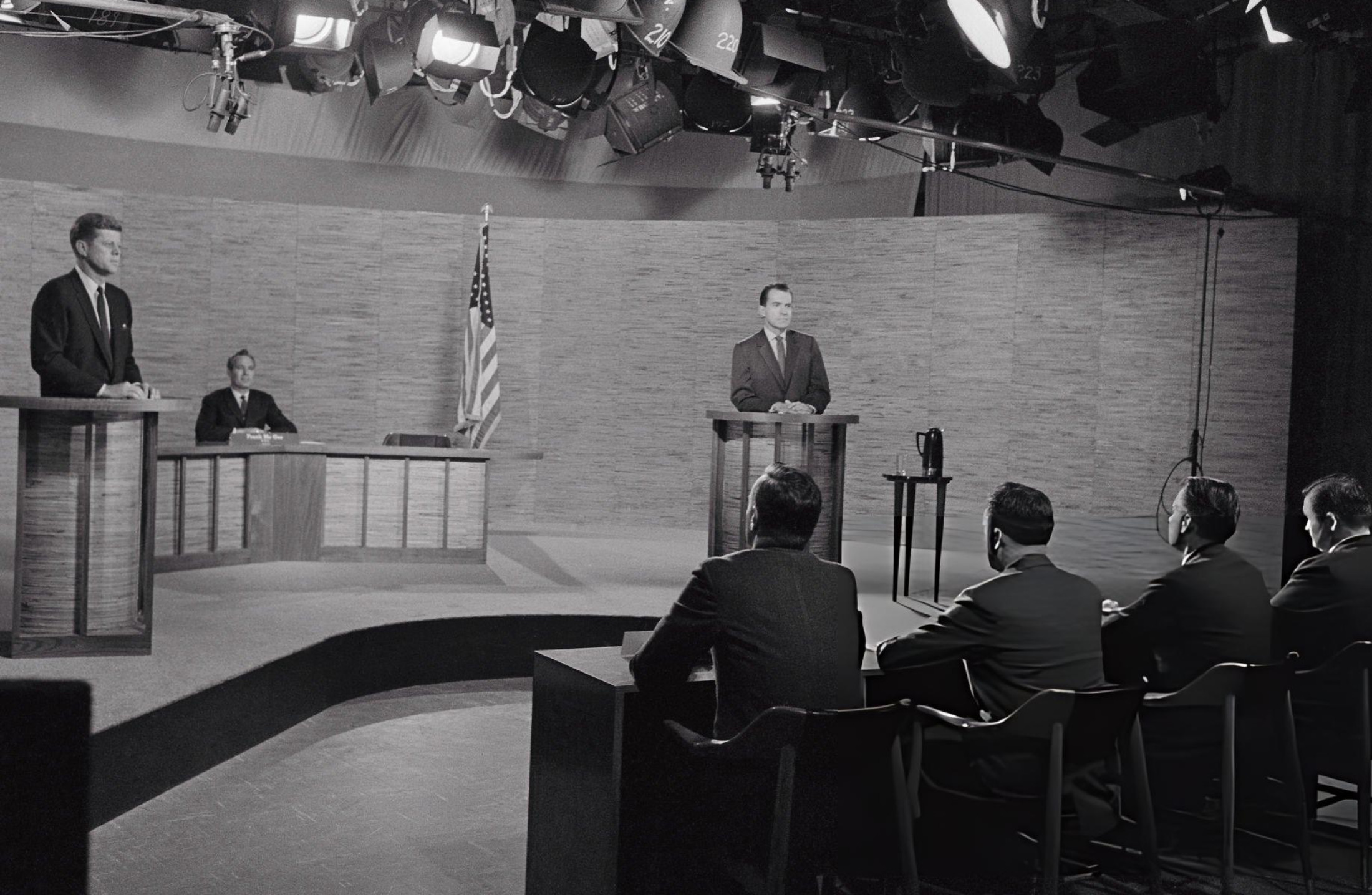
U.S. senator John F. Kennedy (standing on left) and U.S. vice president Richard Nixon (standing on right) participate in the second 1960 presidential debate, held on October 7, 1960 at NBC's studios in Washington, D.C., and moderated by Frank McGee

During presidential election campaigns in the United States, it has become customary for the candidates to engage in one or more debates. The topics discussed in the debate are often the most controversial issues of the time, and arguably elections have been nearly decided by these debates. Candidate debates are not constitutionally mandated, but they are now considered an intrinsic part of the election process. The debates are targeted mainly at undecided voters; those who tend not to be partial to any political ideology or party.

Presidential debates are typically held late in the election cycle, after the political parties have nominated their candidates. The candidates typically meet in a large hall, often at a university, and usually before an audience of citizens. The formats of the debates have varied, with questions sometimes posed from one or more journalist moderators and in other cases members of the audience. The debate formats established during the 1988 through 2000 campaigns were governed in detail by secret memoranda of understanding (MOU) between the two major candidates; the MOU for the 2004 debates was, unlike the earlier agreements, jointly released to the public by the participants.

Debates have been broadcast live on television, radio, and in recent years, the web. The first debate for the 1960 election drew over 66 million viewers out of a population of 179 million, making it one of the most-watched broadcasts in U.S. television history. The 1980 debates drew 80 million viewers out of a population of 226 million. Recent debates have drawn smaller audiences, ranging from 46 million for the first 2000 debate to a high of over 67 million for the first debate in 2012. A record-breaking audience of over 84 million people watched the first 2016 presidential debate between Donald Trump and Hillary Clinton, a number that does not reflect online streaming with a one-hour speech, then the other candidate had an hour and a half to rebut, and finally the first candidate closed the debate with a half-hour response. Douglas was later re-elected to the U.S. Senate by the Illinois legislature. Lincoln and Douglas were both nominated for president in 1860 by the Republicans and Northern Democrats, respectively, and their earlier debates helped define their respective positions in that election, but they did not meet during the 1860 presidential election.

== Early presidential primary candidate debates ==
Wendell Willkie became the first 20th century presidential candidate to challenge his opponent to a face to face debate when in 1940 he challenged President Franklin D. Roosevelt, but Roosevelt refused. In 1948, presidential candidate debates became a reality when a radio debate was held in Oregon between Republicans Thomas E. Dewey and Harold Stassen during the party's presidential primary.

The Democrats followed suit in 1956 with a televised presidential primary debate between Adlai Stevenson and Estes Kefauver, and in 1960 by one between John F. Kennedy and Hubert Humphrey.

In 1956, during the 1956 presidential campaign, University of Maryland student Fred Kahn led an effort to bring the two major presidential candidates, Adlai Stevenson II, the Democratic nominee, and President Dwight Eisenhower, the Republican nominee, to the campus for a debate. Various newspapers were contacted and numerous letters were sent in an effort to generate interest and garner support for the proposal.

Former first lady Eleanor Roosevelt was among those who received a letter. Kahn later told Guy Raz during an All Things Considered interview on NPR in 2012 that she replied, saying, "not only would the students of the University of Maryland be interested, but also other students." Roosevelt said that she was going to forward Kahn's letter to James Finnegan, Adlai Stevenson's campaign manager. In the end, no debate took place, but Kahn's effort received national press exposure, helping lay groundwork for the Kennedy–Nixon debates four years later during the 1960 presidential campaign.

== 1960 Kennedy–Nixon debates ==
The first general election presidential debate was 1960 United States presidential debates, held on September 26, 1960, between Senator John F. Kennedy, the Democratic nominee, and Vice President Richard Nixon, the Republican nominee, at CBS's WBBM-TV in Chicago. It was moderated by Howard K. Smith and included a panel composed of Sander Vanocur of NBC News, Charles Warren of Mutual News, Stuart Novins of CBS, and Bob Fleming of ABC News. At the outset, Nixon was considered to have the upper hand due to his knowledge of foreign policy and proficiency in radio debates. However, because of his unfamiliarity with the new format of televised debates, factors such as his underweight and pale appearance, his suit color blending in with the debate set background, and his refusal to use television makeup resulting in a five o'clock shadow, led to his defeat. Many observers have regarded Kennedy's win over Nixon in the first debate as a turning point in the election. After the first debate, polls showed Kennedy moving from a slight deficit into a slight lead over Nixon.

Three more debates were subsequently held between the candidates: on October 7 at the WRC-TV NBC studio in Washington, D.C., narrated by Frank McGee with a panel of four newsmen Paul Niven of CBS, Edward P. Morgan of ABC, Alvin Spivak of United Press International, and Harold R. Levy of Newsday, on October 13, with Nixon at the ABC studio in Los Angeles and Kennedy at the ABC studio in New York City, narrated by Bill Shadel with a panel of four newsmen in a different Los Angeles studio; and October 21 at the ABC studio in New York, narrated by Quincy Howe with a panel of four including Frank Singiser, John Edwards, Walter Cronkite, and John Chancellor. Nixon regained his lost weight, wore television makeup, and appeared more forceful than in his initial appearance, winning the second and third debates while the fourth was a draw, however the viewership numbers of these subsequent events did not match the high set by the first debate and ultimately did not help Nixon as he lost the election.

== 1976 presidential debate ==
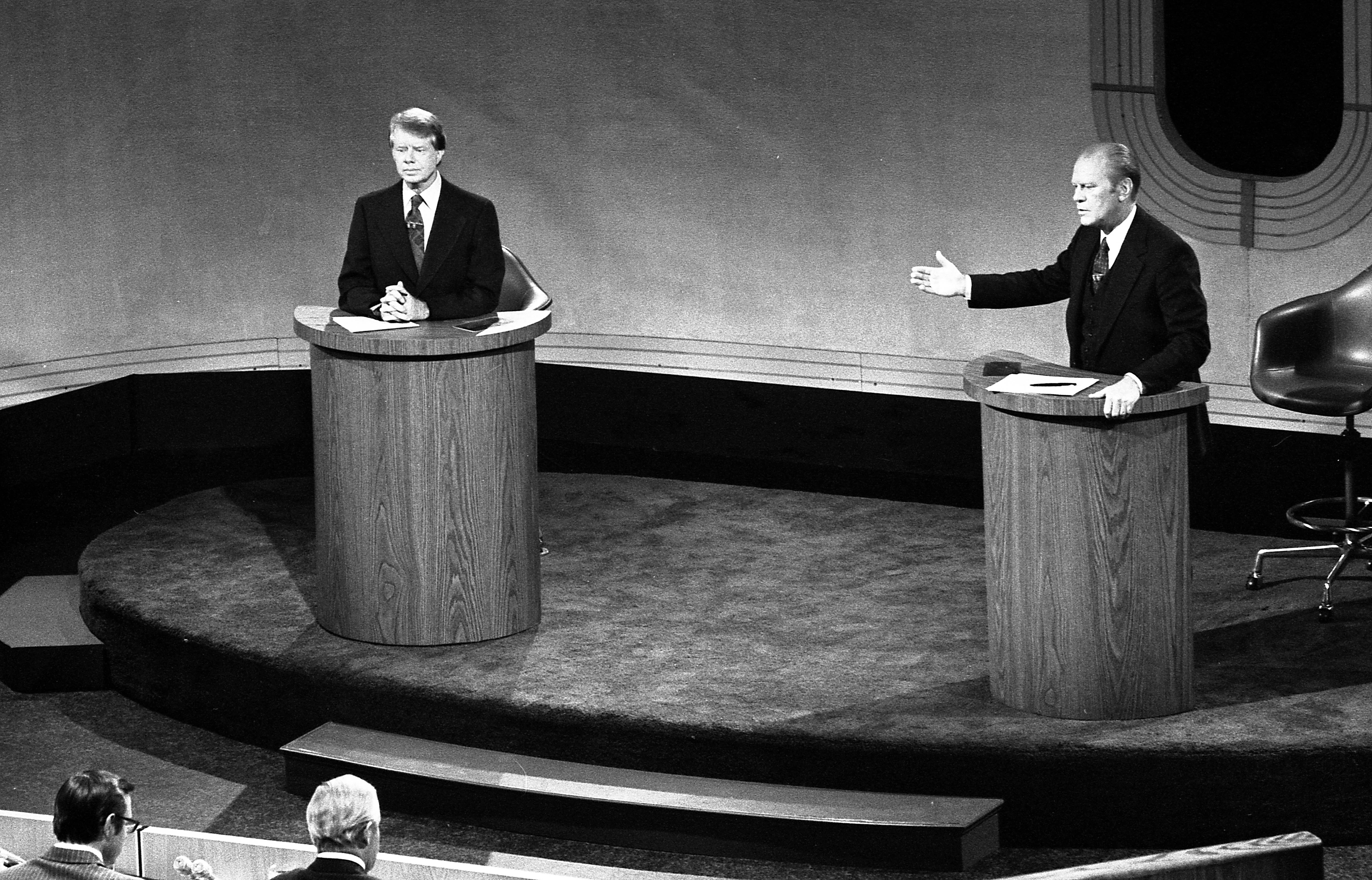
Jimmy Carter (left) and Gerald Ford (right) debate domestic policy at the Walnut Street Theatre in Philadelphia, on September 23, 1976

After the Kennedy–Nixon debates, it was 16 years before general election presidential candidates again debated each other face to face. During this interval intra-party debates were held during the 1968 Democratic primaries, between Robert F. Kennedy and Eugene McCarthy, and again during the 1972 Democratic primaries, between George McGovern, Hubert Humphrey, and others.

The next presidential candidates debates occurred during the 1976 campaign, when President Gerald Ford, who had entered office two years earlier after President Richard Nixon resigned, agreed to three debates with his Democratic challenger, Jimmy Carter.

The 1976 debates, one on domestic issues, one on foreign policy, and one on any topic, were held before studio audiences, and, like the 1960 debates, were televised nationally. The League of Women Voters sponsored the debates. This was a change from the Kennedy–Nixon debates, which had been sponsored by the television networks themselves.

Roughly an hour into the first televised debate, the broadcast audio coming from the Walnut Street Theatre and fed to all networks suddenly cut out, effectively muting the candidates in the middle of a statement by Carter. The two candidates were initially unaware of this technical glitch and continued to debate, unheard to the television audience. They were soon informed of this problem, and proceeded to stand still and silently at their lecterns for about 27 minutes, until the problem, a blown capacitor, was located and fixed, in time for Carter to briefly finish the statement he had begun when the audio cut out, and for both candidates to issue closing statements.

The dramatic effect of televised presidential debates was demonstrated again in the 1976 debates between Ford and Carter. Ford had already cut into Carter's large lead in the polls, and was generally viewed as having won the first debate on domestic policy. Polls released after this first debate indicated the race was even. However, in the second debate on foreign policy, Ford made what was widely viewed as a major blunder when he said "There is no Soviet domination of Eastern Europe and there never will be under a Ford administration." After this, Ford's momentum stalled, and Carter won a very close election.

== 1980 and 1984 presidential debates ==
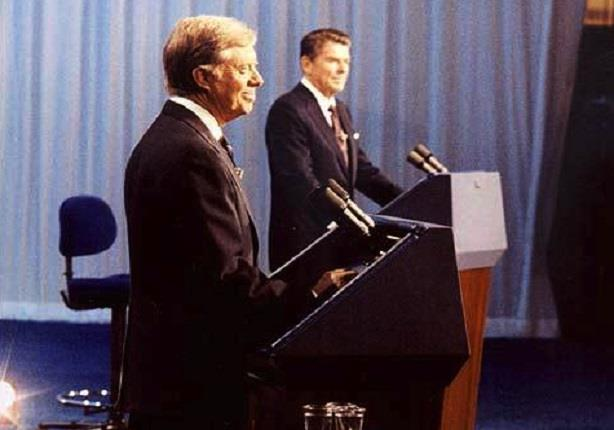
President Jimmy Carter (left) and former governor Ronald Reagan (right) at the presidential debate October 28, 1980. Reagan most memorably deployed the phrase "there you go again."

The League of Women Voters also sponsored the debates held in 1980 and in 1984.

In 1980, debates were a major factor again. Earlier in the election season, President Carter held a substantial lead over his opponents. Three debates between Carter, former California governor Ronald Reagan and Illinois congressman John B. Anderson (who was running as an independent), were originally scheduled; along with a single vice presidential debate between incumbent Walter Mondale, former CIA director George Bush, and former Wisconsin governor Patrick Joseph Lucey. Carter refused to debate if Anderson was present and Reagan refused to debate without Anderson, resulting in the first debate being between Reagan and Anderson only. The second debate and the vice presidential debate were both cancelled. Reagan eventually conceded to Carter's demand, and a single debate took place with only Carter and Reagan. With years of experience in front of a camera as an actor, Reagan came across much better than Carter in the debate and was judged by voters to have won by a wide margin. Reagan's debate performance likely helped propel his landslide victory in the general election.

The Reagan campaign had access to internal debate briefing materials for Carter; the exposure of this in 1983 led to a public scandal called "Debategate".

In 1984, former vice president Walter Mondale won the first debate over President Ronald Reagan, generating much-needed donations to Mondale's lagging campaign. The second presidential debate was held on October 21, 1984, where Ronald Reagan used a joke, "I will not make age an issue of this campaign. I am not going to exploit, for political purposes, my opponent's youth and inexperience", which effectively stalled Mondale's momentum.

Since 1976, each presidential election has featured a series of presidential debates. Vice presidential debates have been held regularly since 1984. Vice Presidential debates have been largely uneventful and have historically had little impact on the election. Perhaps the most memorable moment in a vice presidential debate came in the 1988 debate between Republican Dan Quayle and Democrat Lloyd Bentsen. Quayle's selection by the incumbent vice-president and Republican presidential candidate George Bush was widely criticized; one reason being his relative lack of experience. In the debate, Quayle attempted to ease this fear by stating that he had as much experience as John F. Kennedy did when he ran for president in 1960. Democrat Bentsen countered with the now famous statement: "Senator, I served with Jack Kennedy. I knew Jack Kennedy. Jack Kennedy was a friend of mine. Senator, you're no Jack Kennedy."

== 1992 presidential debates ==
In 1992, the first debate was held involving both major party candidates and a third-party candidate, billionaire Ross Perot, running against President Bush and the Democratic nominee Governor Bill Clinton. That year, President Bush was criticized for his early hesitation to join the debates, and some described him as a "chicken". Furthermore, he was criticized for looking at his watch which aides initially said was meant to track if the other candidates were debating within their time limits but ultimately it was revealed that the president indeed was checking how much time was left in the debate.

Moderators of nationally televised presidential debates have included Bernard Shaw, Bill Moyers, Jim Lehrer, and Barbara Walters.

As of 2024, these are the most recent debates where a third-party candidate was in.

== Presidential debates since 1992 ==
Saint Anselm College has hosted four primary debates throughout 2004 and 2008; it is a favorite for campaign stops and these national debates because of the college's history in the New Hampshire primary.

Washington University in St. Louis, however, has hosted the presidential debates (organized by the Commission on Presidential Debates) three times (in 1992, 2000, and 2004), more than any other location prior to 2016, and also hosted one of the 2016 debates. The university was also scheduled to host a debate in 1996, but it was later negotiated between the two presidential candidates to reduce the number of debates from three to two. The university hosted the only 2008 vice presidential debate, as well.

Hofstra University, originally an alternate site, was named the host of the first presidential debate in 2016, after Wright State University withdrew with eight weeks remaining. This positioned Hofstra to be the only school to host presidential debates in three consecutive campaign cycles. Most of the presidential/vice presidential debates have been moderated by ABC, CBS, CNN, FOX, NBC, and/or PBS. PBS currently holds the record for the most debates at 16.

The first presidential debate of 2024, between Donald Trump and Joe Biden, was the earliest presidential debate in American history, occurring on June 27, before either candidate was officially nominated. Biden's performance was widely criticized, a factor in his decision to end his campaign.

== Rules and format ==
Some of the debates can feature the candidates standing behind their podiums, or in conference tables with the moderator on the other side. Depending on the agreed format, either the moderator or an audience member can be the one to ask questions. Typically there are no opening statements, just closing statements.

A coin toss determines who gets to answer the first question and who will make their closing remarks first. Each candidate will get alternate turns. Once a question is asked, the candidate has 2 minutes to answer the question. After this, the opposing candidate has around 1 minute to respond and rebut her/his arguments. At the moderator's discretion, the discussion of the question may be extended by 30 seconds per candidate.

In recent debates, colored lights resembling traffic lights have been installed to aid the candidate as to the time left with green indicating 30 seconds, yellow indicating 15 seconds and red indicating only 5 seconds are left. If necessary, a buzzer may be used or a flag.

== Debate sponsorship ==
Control of the presidential debates has been a ground of struggle for more than two decades. The role was filled by the nonpartisan League of Women Voters (LWV) civic organization in 1976, 1980 and 1984. In 1987, the LWV withdrew from debate sponsorship, in protest of the major party candidates attempting to dictate nearly every aspect of how the debates were conducted. On October 2, 1988, the LWV's 14 trustees voted unanimously to pull out of the debates, and on October 3 they issued a press release:

The League of Women Voters is withdrawing sponsorship of the presidential debates...because the demands of the two campaign organizations would perpetrate a fraud on the American voter. It has become clear to us that the candidates' organizations aim to add debates to their list of campaign-trail charades devoid of substance, spontaneity and answers to tough questions. The League has no intention of becoming an accessory to the hoodwinking of the American public.

According to the LWV, they pulled out because "the campaigns presented the League with their debate agreement on September 28, two weeks before the scheduled debate. The campaigns' agreement was negotiated 'behind closed doors' ... [with] 16 pages of conditions not subject to negotiation. Most objectionable to the League...were conditions in the agreement that gave the campaigns unprecedented control over the proceedings.... [including] control the selection of questioners, the composition of the audience, hall access for the press and other issues."

The same year the two major political parties assumed control of organizing presidential debates through the Commission on Presidential Debates (CPD). The commission has been headed since its inception by former chairs of the Democratic National Committee and Republican National Committee.

Some have criticized the exclusion of third party and independent candidates as contributing to lower results for candidates such as the Libertarian Party or the Green Party. Others criticize the parallel interview format as a minimum of getting 15 percent in opinion polls of the CPD's choosing is required to be invited. In 2004, the Citizens' Debate Commission (CDC) was formed with the stated mission of returning control of the debates to an independent nonpartisan body rather than a bipartisan body. Nevertheless, the CPD retained control of the debates that year and in 2008.

In 2024, the Democratic and Republican parties opted out of the CPD debates, in favor of debates in June and September produced by CNN and ABC News respectively. They later agreed to a vice presidential debate in October, which would be hosted by CBS News. All three debates were conducted with no audience or outside press, but would be made available to other broadcasters. The RNC had withdrew from the CPD in 2022 because they felt it "[was] biased and has refused to enact simple and common-sense reforms to help ensure fair debates, including hosting debates before voting begins and selecting moderators who have never worked for candidates on the debate stage."Joe Biden campaign manager Jen O'Malley Dillon stated that the debates had become too much of a "spectacle", the CPD was not consistently enforcing its rules in prior debates, and that the debates' timetable did not end before the start of early voting. This marked the first time the CPD had not sponsored a presidential debate since 1988.

== Timeline ==
Source: Commission on Presidential Debates – Debate history

Election	Presidential debates		Vice presidential debates	
1960	4	Vice President Richard Nixon (R)	No debates until 1976	
1960	4	Senator John F. Kennedy (D)	No debates until 1976	
No debates 1964–1972
1976	3	President Gerald Ford (R)	1	Senator Bob Dole (R)
1976	3	Former Governor Jimmy Carter (D)	1	Senator Walter Mondale (D)
1980	2	President Jimmy Carter (D)	Debate canceled	
1980	2	Former Governor Ronald Reagan (R)	Debate canceled	
1980	2	Congressman John B. Anderson (I)	Debate canceled	
1984	2	President Ronald Reagan (R)	1	Vice President George H. W. Bush (R)
1984	2	Former Vice President Walter Mondale (D)	1	Congresswoman Geraldine Ferraro (D)
1988	2	Vice President George H. W. Bush (R)	1	Senator Dan Quayle (R)
1988	2	Governor Michael Dukakis (D)	1	Senator Lloyd Bentsen (D)
1992	3	President George H. W. Bush (R)	1	Vice President Dan Quayle (R)
1992	3	Governor Bill Clinton (D)	1	Senator Al Gore (D)
1992	3	Businessman Ross Perot (I)	1	Ret. Vice Admiral James Stockdale (I)
1996	2	President Bill Clinton (D)	1	Vice President Al Gore (D)
1996	2	Former Senator Bob Dole (R)	1	Former HUD Secretary Jack Kemp (R)
2000	3	Vice President Al Gore (D)	1	Senator Joe Lieberman (D)
2000	3	Governor George W. Bush (R)	1	Former Secretary of Defense Dick Cheney (R)
2004	3	President George W. Bush (R)	1	Vice President Dick Cheney (R)
2004	3	Senator John Kerry (D)	1	Senator John Edwards (D)
2008	3	Senator John McCain (R)	1	Governor Sarah Palin (R)
2008	3	Senator Barack Obama (D)	1	Senator Joe Biden (D)
2012	3	President Barack Obama (D)	1	Vice President Joe Biden (D)
2012	3	Former Governor Mitt Romney (R)	1	Congressman Paul Ryan (R)
2016	3	Former Secretary of State Hillary Clinton (D)	1	Senator Tim Kaine (D)
2016	3	Businessman Donald Trump (R)	1	Governor Mike Pence (R)
2020	2 (Note: Three presidential debates were originally scheduled for the 2020 election cycle. The second presidential debate was canceled the day after the vice presidential debate was held due to President Donald Trump testing positive for COVID-19.)	President Donald Trump (R)	1	Vice President Mike Pence (R)
2020	2	Former Vice President Joe Biden (D)	1	Senator Kamala Harris (D)
2024	1	President Joe Biden (D)	No vice presidential debates under this presidential matchup (Note: One vice presidential debate was announced for Vice President Kamala Harris and Donald Trump's then-unannounced running mate, though it was never carried out due to Joe Biden dropping out of the race.)	
2024	1	Former President Donald Trump (R)	No vice presidential debates under this presidential matchup	
2024	1	Vice President Kamala Harris (D)	1	Governor Tim Walz (D)
2024	1	Former President Donald Trump (R)	1	Senator JD Vance (R)

=== Sponsors, locations, moderators, panelists and viewership ===
Election	Debate	Date	Sponsor	Location		Moderators	Television Viewership	Source
1960	First debate	September 26, 1960	ABC, CBS, and NBC	WBBM-TV studios	Chicago, Illinois	Howard K. Smith of CBS	66.4 million	
1960	Second debate	October 7, 1960	ABC, CBS, and NBC	WRC-TV studios	Washington, D.C.	Frank McGee of NBC	61.9 million	
1960	Third debate	October 13, 1960	ABC, CBS, and NBC	Split-screen telecast with Nixon and panelists in ABC studios in Los Angeles and Kennedy in ABC studios in New York		Bill Shadel of ABC	63.7 million	
1960	Fourth debate	October 21, 1960	ABC, CBS, and NBC	ABC studios	New York City, New York	Quincy Howe of ABC	60.4 million	
1976	First debate	September 23, 1976	League of Women Voters	Walnut Street Theater	Philadelphia, Pennsylvania	Edwin Newman of NBC	69.7 million	
1976	Second debate	October 6, 1976	League of Women Voters	Palace of Fine Arts	San Francisco, California	Pauline Frederick of NPR	63.9 million	
1976	VP Debate	October 15, 1976	League of Women Voters	Alley Theatre	Houston, Texas	James Hoge of the Chicago Sun-Times	43.2 million	
1976	Third debate	October 22, 1976	League of Women Voters	Phi Beta Kappa Memorial Hall at W&M	Williamsburg, Virginia	Barbara Walters of ABC	62.7 million	
1980	First debate	September 21, 1980	League of Women Voters	Baltimore Convention Center	Baltimore, Maryland	Bill Moyers of PBS		
1980	Second debate	October 28, 1980	League of Women Voters	Public Music Hall	Cleveland, Ohio	Howard K. Smith of ABC	80.6 million	
1984	First debate	October 7, 1984	League of Women Voters	Kentucky Center for the Performing Arts	Louisville, Kentucky	Barbara Walters of ABC	65.1 million	
1984	VP debate	October 11, 1984	League of Women Voters	Philadelphia Convention Hall and Civic Center	Philadelphia, Pennsylvania	Sander Vanocur of ABC	56.7 million	
1984	Second debate	October 21, 1984	League of Women Voters	Music Hall, Municipal Auditorium	Kansas City, Missouri	Edwin Newman	67.3 million	
1988	First debate	September 25, 1988	Commission on Presidential Debates	Wait Chapel at Wake Forest University	Winston-Salem, North Carolina	Jim Lehrer of PBS	65.1 million	
1988	VP debate	October 5, 1988	Commission on Presidential Debates	Omaha Civic Auditorium	Omaha, Nebraska	Judy Woodruff of PBS	46.9 million	
1988	Second debate	October 13, 1988	Commission on Presidential Debates	Pauley Pavilion at UCLA	Los Angeles, California	Bernard Shaw of CNN	67.3 million	
1992	First debate	October 11, 1992	Commission on Presidential Debates	Field House at Washington University in St. Louis	St. Louis, Missouri	Jim Lehrer of PBS	62.4 million	
1992	VP debate	October 13, 1992	Commission on Presidential Debates	Theater for the Arts at Georgia Tech	Atlanta, Georgia	Hal Bruno of ABC	51.2 million	
1992	Second debate	October 15, 1992	Commission on Presidential Debates	Robins Center at University of Richmond	Richmond, Virginia	Carole Simpson of ABC	69.9 million	
1992	Third debate	October 19, 1992	Commission on Presidential Debates	Wharton Center for Performing Arts at MSU	East Lansing, Michigan	Jim Lehrer of PBS	66.9 million	
1996	First debate	October 6, 1996	Commission on Presidential Debates	Mortensen Hall at The Bushnell Center for the Performing Arts	Hartford, Connecticut	Jim Lehrer of PBS	46.1 million	
1996	VP debate	October 9, 1996	Commission on Presidential Debates	Mahaffey Theater	St. Petersburg, Florida	Jim Lehrer of PBS	26.6 million	
1996	Second debate	October 16, 1996	Commission on Presidential Debates	Shiley Theater at University of San Diego	San Diego, California	Jim Lehrer of PBS	36.3 million	
2000	First debate	October 3, 2000	Commission on Presidential Debates	Clark Athletic Center at University of Massachusetts	Boston, Massachusetts	Jim Lehrer of PBS	46.6 million	
2000	VP debate	October 5, 2000	Commission on Presidential Debates	Norton Center for the Arts at Centre College	Danville, Kentucky	Bernard Shaw of CNN	28.5 million	
2000	Second debate	October 11, 2000	Commission on Presidential Debates	Wait Chapel at Wake Forest University	Winston-Salem, North Carolina	Jim Lehrer of PBS	37.5 million	
2000	Third debate	October 17, 2000	Commission on Presidential Debates	Field House at Washington University in St. Louis	St. Louis, Missouri	Jim Lehrer of PBS	37.7 million	
2004	First debate	September 30, 2004	Commission on Presidential Debates	Convocation Center at University of Miami	Coral Gables, Florida	Jim Lehrer of PBS	62.4 million	
2004	VP debate	October 5, 2004	Commission on Presidential Debates	Veale Center at Case Western Reserve University	Cleveland, Ohio	Gwen Ifill of PBS	43.5 million	
2004	Second debate	October 8, 2004	Commission on Presidential Debates	Washington University in St. Louis	St. Louis, Missouri	Charles Gibson of ABC	46.7 million	
2004	Third debate	October 13, 2004	Commission on Presidential Debates	Grady Gammage Memorial Auditorium at ASU	Tempe, Arizona	Bob Schieffer of CBS	51.1 million	
2008	First debate	September 26, 2008	Commission on Presidential Debates	University of Mississippi	Oxford, Mississippi	Jim Lehrer of PBS	52.4 million	
2008	VP debate	October 2, 2008	Commission on Presidential Debates	Washington University in St. Louis	St. Louis, Missouri	Gwen Ifill of PBS	69.9 million	
2008	Second debate	October 7, 2008	Commission on Presidential Debates	Belmont University	Nashville, Tennessee	Tom Brokaw of NBC	63.2 million	
2008	Third debate	October 15, 2008	Commission on Presidential Debates	Hofstra University	Hempstead, New York	Bob Schieffer of CBS	56.5 million	
2012	First debate	October 3, 2012	Commission on Presidential Debates	University of Denver	Denver, Colorado	Jim Lehrer of PBS	67.2 million	
2012	VP debate	October 11, 2012	Commission on Presidential Debates	Centre College	Danville, Kentucky	Martha Raddatz of ABC	51.4 million	
2012	Second debate	October 16, 2012	Commission on Presidential Debates	Hofstra University	Hempstead, New York	Candy Crowley of CNN	65.6 million	
2012	Third debate	October 22, 2012	Commission on Presidential Debates	Wold Performing Arts Center at Lynn University	Boca Raton, Florida	Bob Schieffer of CBS	59.2 million	
2016	First debate	September 26, 2016	Commission on Presidential Debates	Hofstra University	Hempstead, New York	Lester Holt of NBC	84 million	
2016	VP debate	October 4, 2016	Commission on Presidential Debates	Longwood University	Farmville, Virginia	Elaine Quijano of CBS	36 million	
2016	Second debate	October 9, 2016	Commission on Presidential Debates	Washington University in St. Louis	St. Louis, Missouri	Anderson Cooper of CNN; Martha Raddatz of ABC	66.5 million	
2016	Third debate	October 19, 2016	Commission on Presidential Debates	Thomas & Mack Center at University of Nevada, Las Vegas	Paradise, Nevada	Chris Wallace of Fox	71.6 million	
2020	First debate	September 29, 2020	Commission on Presidential Debates	Health Education Campus Samson Pavilion	Cleveland, Ohio	Chris Wallace of Fox	73.1 million	
2020	VP debate	October 7, 2020	Commission on Presidential Debates	Kingsbury Hall at University of Utah	Salt Lake City, Utah	Susan Page of USA Today	57.9 million	
2020	Second debate	~~October 15, 2020~~	Commission on Presidential Debates	~~Arsht Center~~	~~Miami, Florida~~	Steve Scully of C-SPAN	Debate cancelled	
2020	Third debate	October 22, 2020	Commission on Presidential Debates	Belmont University	Nashville, Tennessee	Kristen Welker of NBC	63 million	
2024	First debate	June 27, 2024	CNN, ABC, CBS (for VP debate)	Techwood Turner Campus, Studio D	Atlanta, Georgia	Jake Tapper of CNN; Dana Bash of CNN	51.3 million	
2024	Second debate	September 10, 2024	CNN, ABC, CBS (for VP debate)	National Constitution Center	Philadelphia, Pennsylvania	David Muir of ABC; Linsey Davis of ABC	67.1 million	
2024	VP debate	October 1, 2024	CNN, ABC, CBS (for VP debate)	CBS Broadcast Center	New York City, New York	Margaret Brennan of CBS; Norah O'Donnell of CBS	43 million	

== See also ==
- Free & Equal Elections Foundation
