= Fuzzy math =

Fuzzy Math may refer to:

- In mathematics, Fuzzy mathematics.
- In education, a derogatory term for Reform mathematics.
- A derogatory political term, Fuzzy math (politics)
