= Hearn Plaza =

Upper quad at Wake Forest University

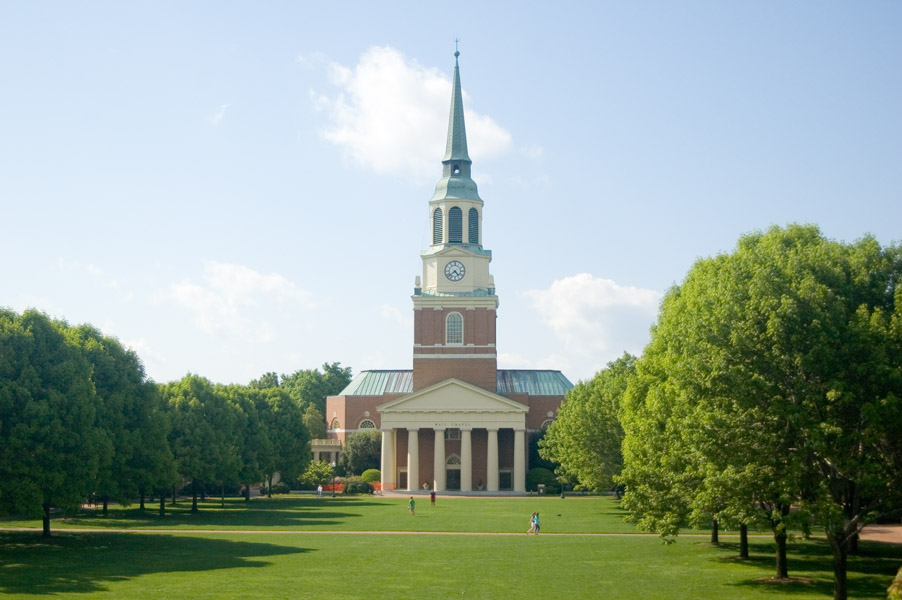
- Wait Chapel overlooks the northwestern end of the plaza
- Interactive map of the Hearn Plaza area
- Former names: University Plaza
- Alternative names: The Quad; Upper Quad

General information
- Location: Winston-Salem, North Carolina, U.S.
- Coordinates: 36.13437°N 80.27818°W
- Named for: Thomas K. Hearn
- Completed: 1956 (70 years ago)

Hearn Plaza (also known as The Quad or Upper Quad; formerly known as University Plaza) is the main quadrangle at Wake Forest University's North Campus in Winston-Salem, North Carolina, United States. Completed in 1956, along with many of the surrounding buildings, it is named for Thomas K. Hearn, the twelfth president of the university. He served in the role for 22 years.

Standing at the plaza's northwestern end is Wait Chapel, while on the opposite side of the quad is Reynolda Hall, which separates Hearn Plaza from Manchester Plaza (or Magnolia Quad), the lower quad. The plaza is surrounded by six upperclassmen residential buildings, a Subway restaurant, a bookstore and a clothing store. A path circumnavigates the plaza, while another bisects it.

In addition to commencements, among the events held on the quad is "Project Pumpkin", a fundraising event for the university's Children's Defense Funds Freedom School. First held in 1988, the event raised a record $6,000 in 2023.

"Hit the Bricks" is another annual event. An eight-to-ten-hour relay race around the plaza, it raises money for the Brian Piccolo Cancer Fund.

"Rolling the Quad" is a university tradition that is held after major victories in athletic competition. Rolls of toilet paper are thrown into the plaza's trees in celebration.

== Constituent buildings ==
Clockwise from the northwest:

- Wait Chapel
- Huffman Hall
- Poteat Hall (including Zick's)
- Kitchin Hall (including the Deacon Shop)
- Reynolda Hall (including The Fresh Food Company)
- Davis Hall (including Subway)
- Taylor Hall (including Campus Grounds and Taylor Bookstore)
- Efird Hall
