= Reynolda Hall =

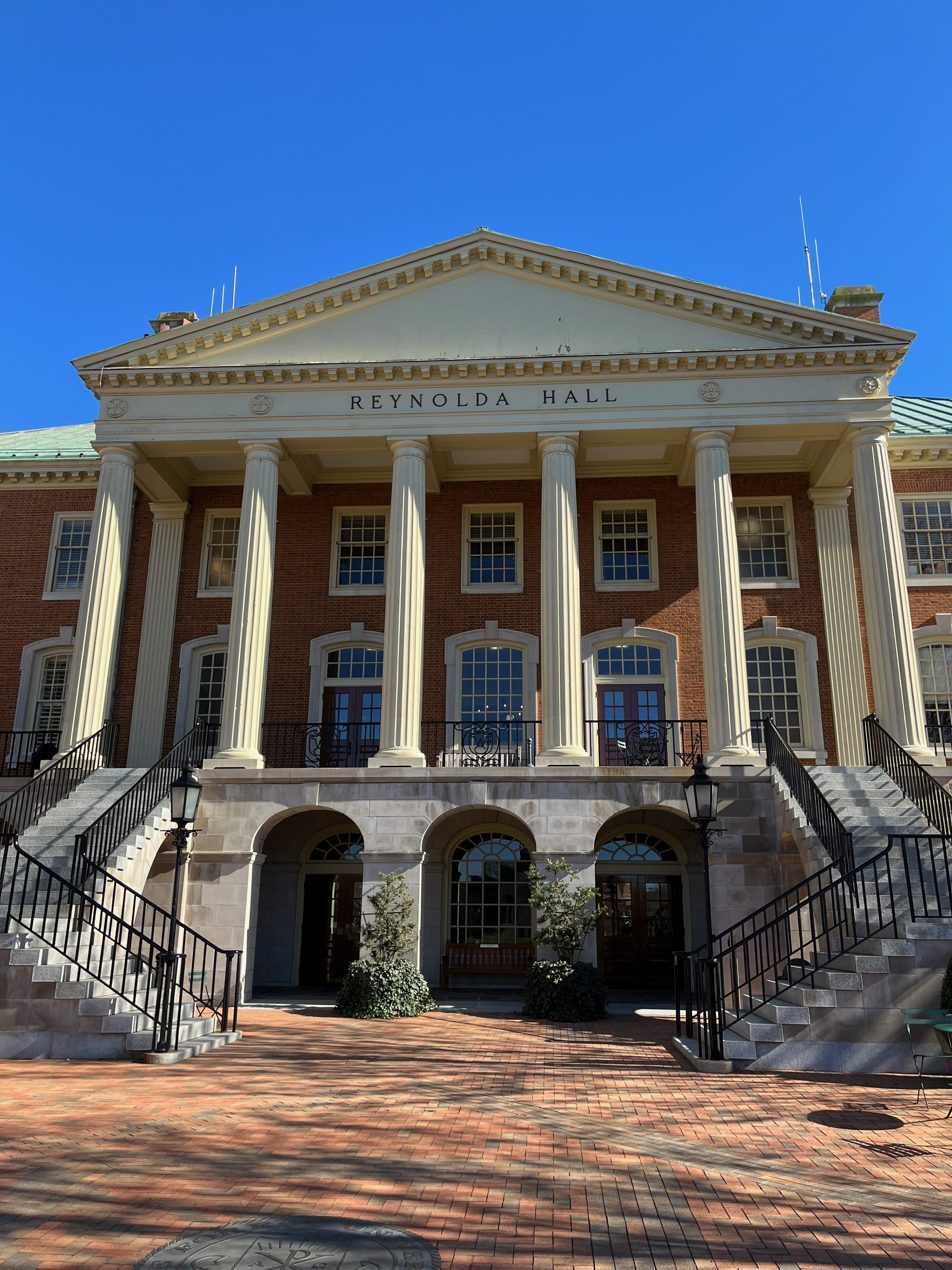
- The central section of Reynolda Hall (2023)
- Interactive map of the Reynolda Hall area

General information
- Location: Winston-Salem, North Carolina, U.S., 2130 Eure Drive
- Coordinates: 36.1335°N 80.2774°W
- Opened: 1956 (70 years ago)

Reynolda Hall is the main building on the Reynolda Campus of Wake Forest University in Winston-Salem, North Carolina. It is located on the southeastern side of Hearn Plaza (also known as the Upper Quad), opposite Wait Chapel, while the rear of the building overlooks Manchester Plaza (Magnolia Quad or Lower Quad).

The building, which opened in 1956, is named for Reynolda, the country estate of the family of R. J. Reynolds, a prominent businessman in Winston-Salem. Reynolda is the Latin feminine for Reynolds, a naming convention aimed to recognize the role Katharine Smith Reynolds, wife of R. J., had in the development of the estate.

Reynolda Hall contains a cafeteria (nicknamed The Pit), the Green Room study area, the Magnolia Room dining hall and administrative offices.
