= Bernard Shaw (journalist) =

American journalist (1940–2022)

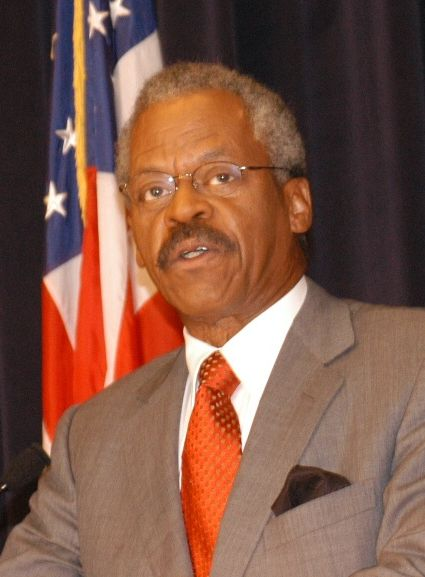
- Shaw in 2004
- Born: May 22, 1940; Chicago, Illinois, U.S.
- Died: September 7, 2022 (aged 82); Washington, D.C., U.S.
- Education: University of Illinois, Chicago (BA)
- Occupation: Journalist
- Years active: 1971–2001
- Spouse: Linda Allston (m. 1974)
- Children: 2
- Military career
- Allegiance: United States
- Branch: United States Marine Corps
- Rank: Corporal
- Conflicts: Vietnam War

Bernard Shaw (May 22, 1940 – September 7, 2022) was an American journalist and lead news anchor for CNN from its launch in 1980 until his retirement on March 2, 2001. Prior to his time at CNN, he was a reporter and anchor for WNUS, Westinghouse Broadcasting, CBS News, and ABC News.

== Early life ==
Shaw was born in Chicago, Illinois, to Edgar Shaw, a railroad employee and house painter, and Camilla (Murphy) Shaw, a housekeeper. He attended the University of Illinois Chicago from 1963 to 1968. He served in the United States Marine Corps, including stints in Hawaii and at Marine Corps Air Station Cherry Point, North Carolina, where in 1962 he was a "Message Center" specialist, achieving the rank of Corporal, E-4. He exhibited a passionate interest in the print media, clipping articles from newspapers, and often traveled on weekends to Washington, D.C. He cultivated an acquaintance with Walter Cronkite and had an interest in baseball.

== Career ==
Shaw began his broadcasting career as an anchor and reporter for WNUS in Chicago in 1964. He then worked as a reporter for the Westinghouse Broadcasting Company in Chicago, moving later to Washington as the White House correspondent. He worked as a correspondent in the Washington Bureau of CBS News from 1971 to 1977. In 1977, he moved to ABC News as a Latin American correspondent and bureau chief before becoming the Capitol Hill Senior Correspondent.

Shaw left ABC in 1980 to move to CNN as co-anchor of its PrimeNews broadcast, anchoring from Washington, D.C. Shaw's coverage of the 1981 assassination attempt on U.S. President Ronald Reagan (with Shaw joined by former CBS News correspondent Daniel Schorr, one of the first on-air personalities hired by the fledgling cable channel) is credited as helping to establish CNN as a credible and reliable broadcast news source at an early point in the network's history.

As the leading anchor of CNN, Shaw covered a variety of events that shaped the political and societal reality of the 20th century, including the student revolt in Tiananmen Square in 1989, the 1994 Northridge earthquake, the death and funeral of Princess Diana in 1997, and the 2000 United States presidential election.

Shaw was widely known for the question he posed to Democratic U.S. presidential candidate Michael Dukakis at his second presidential debate with George H. W. Bush during the 1988 election, which Shaw was moderating. Knowing that Dukakis opposed the death penalty, Shaw asked him if he would support an irrevocable death penalty for a man who hypothetically raped and murdered Dukakis's wife. Dukakis responded that he would not; critics felt he framed his response too legalistically and logically and did not address it sufficiently on a personal level. Kitty Dukakis, among other public figures, found the question inflammatory and unwarranted at a presidential debate. Several journalists also on the panel with Shaw, including Ann Compton, Andrea Mitchell, and Margaret Garrard Warner, expressed an interest in leaving Dukakis's name out of the question.

He is also remembered for his reporting on the 1991 Gulf War. His journalistic involvement in this moment of history led him to be recognized as one of the three “Boys of Baghdad” (Vargas, 2022). Reporting with CNN correspondents John Holliman and Peter Arnett from the Al-Rashid Hotel in Baghdad, he found shelter under a desk as he reported cruise missiles flying past his window. He also made frequent trips back and forth from the hotel's bomb shelter. While describing the situation in Baghdad, he famously stated "Clearly I've never been there, but this feels like we're in the center of hell."

Shaw moderated the October 2000 vice-presidential debate between Dick Cheney and Joe Lieberman.

Shaw co-anchored CNN's Inside Politics from 1992 until he retired from CNN in March 2001. He then occasionally appeared on CNN, including in May 2005, when a plane flew into restricted air space in Washington, D.C. He co-anchored Judy Woodruff's last broadcast on CNN in June 2005. Shaw reflected over his 41 years in journalism, that his success was not worth what he missed in his personal life. Shaw appeared on the June 1, 2020, episode of CNN's Erin Burnett OutFront to recognize the 40th anniversary of the start of the network.

== Accolades ==
- 1994: Walter Cronkite Award for Excellence in Journalism.
- 1996: Paul White Award, Radio Television Digital News Association
- Bernard Shaw was inducted as a Laureate of The Lincoln Academy of Illinois and awarded the Order of Lincoln (the State's highest honor) by the Governor of Illinois in 2002 in the area of Communications.
- 1999: Shaw became part of the Broadcasting & Cable Hall of Fame
- 2001: Lifetime honor from the Edward R. Murrow Awards
- 2007: Shaw was granted the Chuck Stone Lifetime Achievement Award from the National Association of Black Journalists

== Personal life ==
Shaw was married to Linda Allston from March 30, 1974, until his death. They had two children: Amar Edgar and Anil Louise.

Shaw died at a hospital in Washington, D.C., on September 7, 2022, at the age of 82. His death was attributed to pneumonia.
