= William Louis Poteat =

American professor (1856–1938)

1935 painting of Poteat

William Louis Poteat (1856–1938), also known as "Doctor Billy", was an American professor (c. 1880–1905) and then the seventh president (1905–1927) of Wake Forest College (today, Wake Forest University). Poteat was conspicuous in many civic roles becoming a leader of the Progressive Movement in North Carolina and the South, and a champion of higher education. A devout Baptist, he defended the teaching of evolution as the "divine method of creation", arguing it was fully compatible with Christian beliefs.

== Early life ==
Poteat was born in Caswell County, North Carolina, to a noted Baptist, slave-owning family; among his siblings was Ida Isabella Poteat, who taught art at Meredith College for many years. His brother Edwin McNeill Poteat was a minister and educator, serving as president of Furman University from 1903 to 1918.

William Louis Poteat went on to graduate with a Bachelor of Arts degree from Wake Forest College (then located in Wake Forest, North Carolina) in 1877. Shortly after graduating, he was hired there as a natural science instructor. He became a public intellectual and leading theological liberal among Baptists in the South.

== Evolution ==
He first taught himself biology before studying at the University of Berlin. His studies convinced him of the Darwinian concepts of natural selection and evolution. Poteat reconciled his scientific conclusions with a modernist or liberal form of Christianity. His beliefs were not shared by more conservative Baptists, who tried to remove him. Poteat fought back and survived, and helped persuade the North Carolina General Assembly to defeat a bill that would have banned the teaching of evolution (as other states had done; see Scopes Monkey Trial).

== Presidency at Wake Forest College ==
He was the first layman to be elected president in Wake Forest College's history. "Dr. Billy" continued to promote growth, hired many outstanding professors, and expanded the science curriculum. He also stirred upheaval among North Carolina Baptists with his strong support of teaching the theory of evolution but eventually won formal support from the Baptist State Convention for academic freedom at the college.

Poteat Residence Hall, overlooking the university's Upper Quad, is named for him.

== Later years ==
In 1934, Poteat expressed interest in becoming President of Stetson University, but he effectively withdrew himself from consideration by not attending an interview with the Board of Trustees.
