= Thomas K. Hearn =

University administrator (b. 1937, d. 2008)

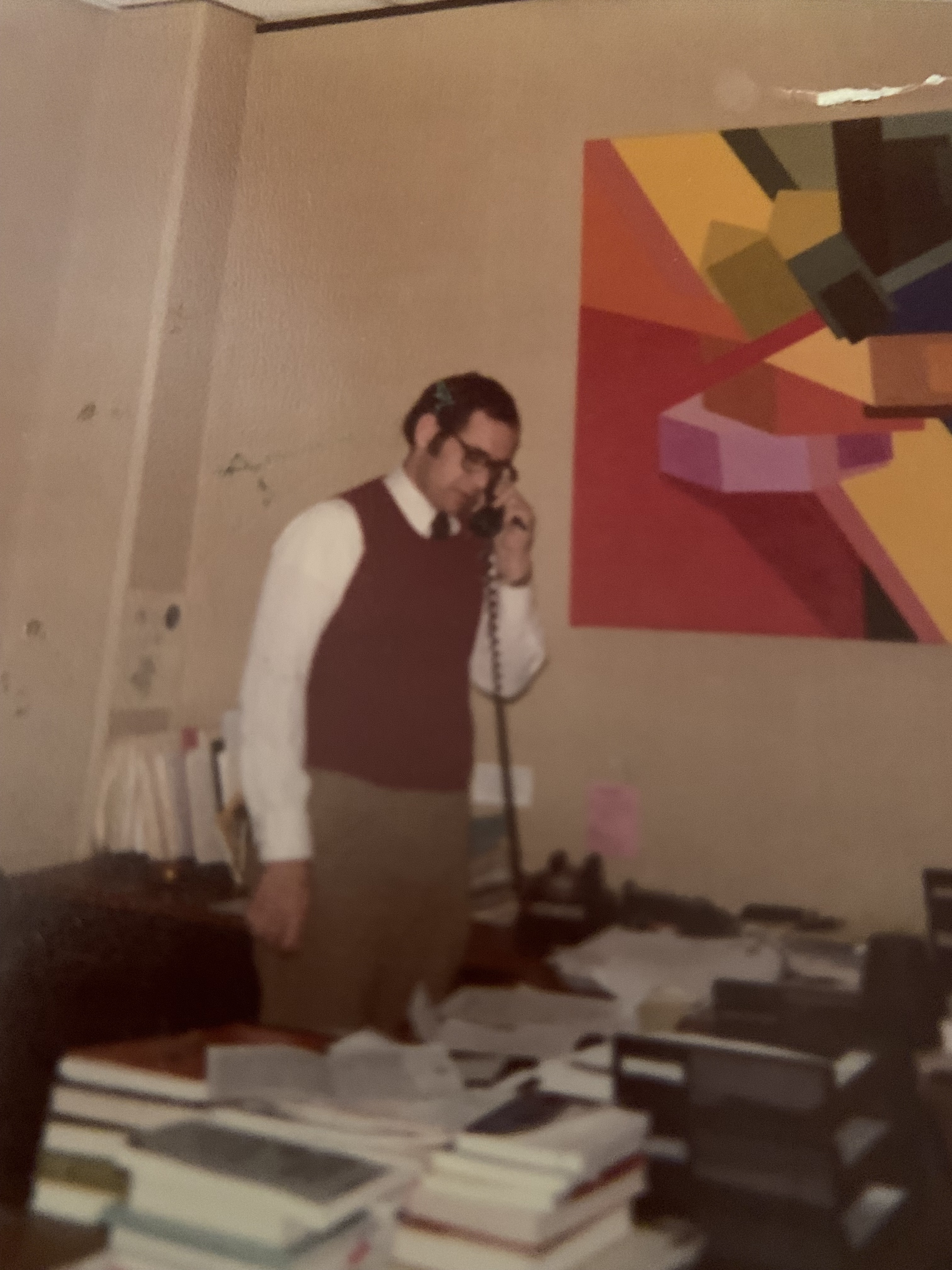
Thomas Hearn at UAB, 1978

Thomas K. Hearn Jr. (July 5, 1937 – August 18, 2008) was the twelfth president of Wake Forest University in Winston-Salem, North Carolina. Hearn served as president from 1983 to 2005, which is the second-longest tenure in the university's history. During Hearn's time as president he oversaw the transformation of the school from a regional Southern Baptist college into one of the nation's premier independent universities.

== Background ==
Hearn was born in Opp, Alabama, on July 5, 1937. He then went on to attend Birmingham-Southern College, where he graduated summa cum laude. Hearn also earned a divinity degree from the Southern Baptist Theological Seminary as well as a Ph.D. in philosophy from Vanderbilt University. Hearn went on to teach philosophy at the College of William and Mary. In 1974 Hearn became the Chair of the philosophy department at the University of Alabama-Birmingham, where he hired James Rachels and Gregory Pence, each of whom would later become Chairs. At UAB, he went on to become the dean of the School of Humanities, vice president, and senior vice president for non-medical affairs.

== Tenure at Wake Forest University ==
Hearn was appointed the 12th president of Wake Forest University in 1983. He served as president until 2005. During his time as president he oversaw the university grow from a regional Baptist school to a nationally regarded independent university. Hearn was behind the university's break from the Baptist State Convention of North Carolina. This was in order for the university to gain governing independence. In addition, Hearn spearheaded the largest building project since the university's construction in order to provide more academic and living spaces for students. Hearn worked to expand the school and grow its nationwide recognition. This was recognized when the U.S. News & World Report ranked Wake Forest as a top 30 university in the country in 1994. Wake Forest has continuously been ranked in the top 30 by U.S. News & World Report every year since then. During Hearn's tenure the number of applications Wake Forest was receiving increased by 75% between 1983 and 2005.

== Legacy ==
Hearn's legacy at Wake Forest was honored by the renaming of the main quad from University Plaza to Hearn Plaza following his retirement. Additionally, The Brain Tumor Center of Excellence at Wake Forest School of Medicine named their research operations the Thomas K. Hearn Jr. Brain Tumor Research Center in honor of the work Hearn did to expand the funding for brain tumor research during his tenure at Wake Forest University. The Center for Creative Leadership posthumously published his essays in 2022 on life and leadership.
