= Janet H. Brown =

American politician

Janet Brown
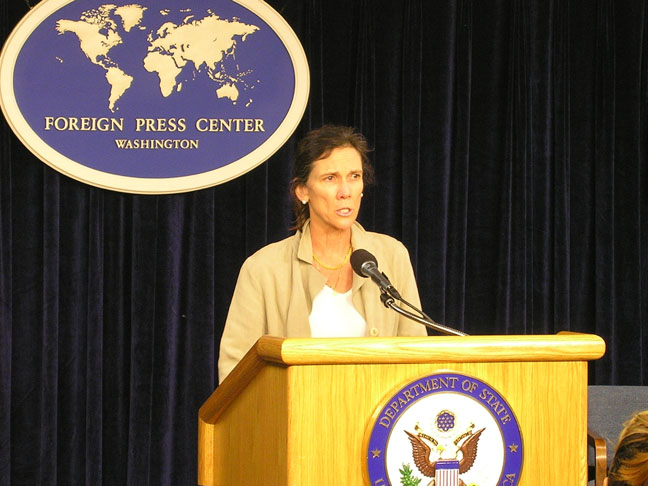

Executive Director of the Commission on Presidential Debates
- Incumbent
- Assumed office 1987
- Preceded by: Position created

Personal details
- Education: Williams College (BA); Harvard University (MPA)

Janet H. Brown is an American political executive and former government official serving as the executive director of the Commission on Presidential Debates in the United States.

She has led the commission since its founding in 1987 and has worked in staff positions at the White House, Office of Management and Budget, United States Department of State, and United States Senate. She graduated with a Bachelor of Arts degree from Williams College and with a Master's Degree in Public Administration from Harvard University.
