= Samuel Wait =

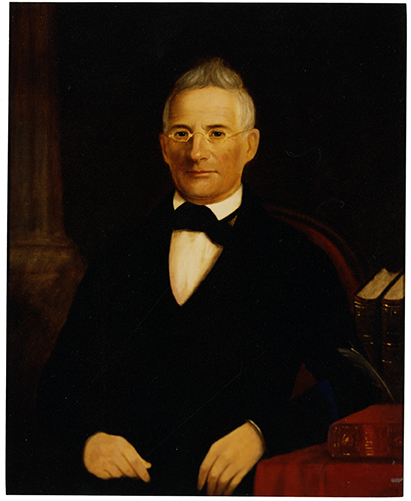
- Wait pictured around 1840

First president of Wake Forest University
- In office 1834–1845
- Succeeded by: William Hooper

Personal details
- Born: December 19, 1789; White Creek, New York, U.S.
- Died: July 28, 1867 (aged 77); Wake Forest, North Carolina, U.S.
- Spouse: Sarah Merriam

Samuel Wait (December 19, 1789 – July 28, 1867) was a Baptist minister and educator. He served as the first principal of Wake Forest University (then called Wake Forest Institute) in North Carolina. He was also the Institute's first president, serving from 1834 to 1845. Wait Chapel, on today's college campus, in Winston-Salem, is named for him.

== Early life ==
Samuel Wait was born in 1789 in White Creek, New York, to Joseph Wait and Martha Smith. The family moved to Middletown, Vermont, during Wait's childhood.

He studied at the Thomas Jefferson University, then Columbian College (today known as George Washington University); however, he received a master's degree from Colby College in Maine in 1825.

== Career ==
Wait began his ministerial career at the Baptist church in Sharon, Massachusetts, in 1816.

In 1826, he was sent, along with Dr. William Staughton, to New Bern, North Carolina, to raise funds for the church. He moved his family to North Carolina the following year.

He helped establish the Baptist State Convention in 1830. Three years later, the Convention founded a literary institute, named Wake Forest Institute, in Wake County, North Carolina. Wait was named principal, and oversaw the education of seventy students between 1834 and 1835. In 1838, the Institute was renamed Wake Forest College, and Wait became its first president. He remained in the role for six years. Upon his resignation, in 1845, Wait became the chairman of the university's board of trustees. Four years later, he was awarded an honorary doctorate in divinity.

In 1851, Wait became president of Oxford Female College, in Ohio, and retired in the role six years later.

== Personal life ==
Wait married Vermont native Sarah "Sally" Merriam, daughter of Jonathan Merriam and Sarah Conant, with whom he had two known children: Anna Eliza (born 1826) and William Carey (born 1829). William died at around two years of age.

After retiring, in 1857, Wait and his wife moved to Forestville, North Carolina, where they remained for the rest of their lives.

== Death ==
Wait died in 1867, aged 77, in Forestville. He was interred in Wake Forest Cemetery in Wake Forest. His widow was buried beside him upon her death four years later.

=== Legacy ===
Wait Chapel, on today's Wake Forest University campus, is named for him. It was completed in 1956. His portrait hangs in Reynolda Hall on the campus.
