= Efird's Department Store =

- U.S. National Register of Historic Places
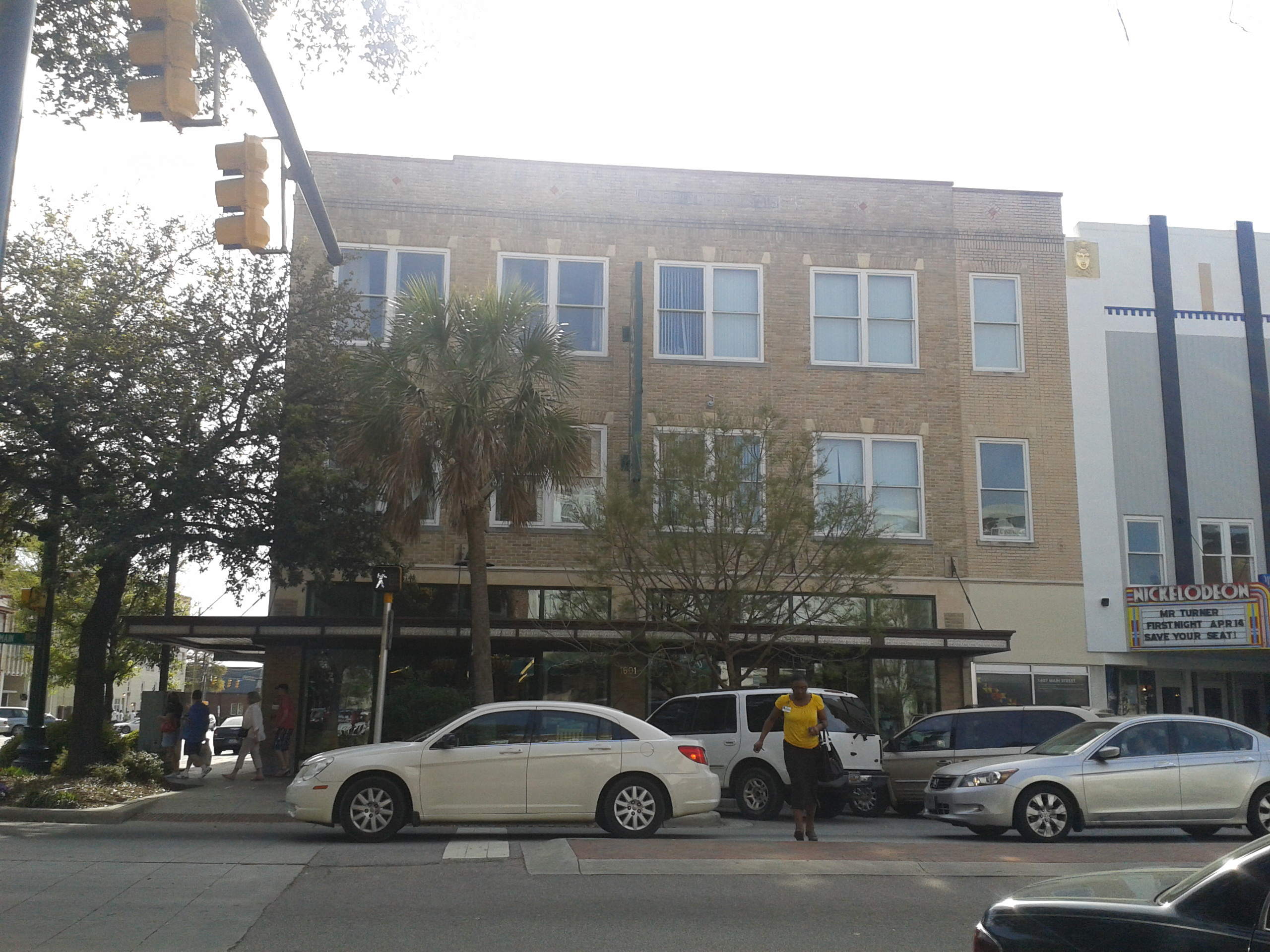
- Efird's Department Store in April, 2015

- Location within South Carolina Location within the United States
- Location: 1601 Main St., Columbia, South Carolina
- Coordinates: 34°00′24″N 81°02′10″W
- Area: Less than one acre
- Built: 1870, 1919
- NRHP reference No.: 12000850
- Added to NRHP: October 9, 2012

Efird's Department Store, also known as Lourie's Department Store, is a historic department store building located at Columbia, South Carolina. It was built about 1870, and is a rectangular brick building renovated and expanded in 1919. This included the addition of a third story and the installation of a new brick façade and store entrances. Between 1919 and 1958, it housed the Columbia branch of the Charlotte, North Carolina based Efird's Department Store chain. It currently houses a Mast General Store, which moved in on May 25, 2011.

It was added to the National Register of Historic Places in 2012.
