= Fuzzy math (politics) =

Fuzzy math is a catch phrase used often by American politicians to describe numbers, particularly in regard to government spending, that they claim do not add up correctly. It is frequently used by politicians who are dismissing another politician's numbers as doubtful or otherwise inaccurate.

== Origin ==
The term was popularized by the October 3, 2000 United States presidential debate in which George W. Bush repeatedly responded to opponent Al Gore's statistical figures with accusations of "fuzzy math". In the first fuzzy math mention, Bush said, "I’m beginning to think not only did he invent the Internet, but he invented the calculator. It’s fuzzy math." Later Bush declared "the man is practicing fuzzy math again" regarding an unrelated figure, and "this man is disparaging my plan with all this Washington fuzzy math" in a separate instance. "I can’t let the man continue with this fuzzy math", Bush stated once more.

Others later turned the term against Bush. It has since been used by other politicians in attacks against opponents or various stances, such as concern over global warming.
