= Pauline Frederick (journalist) =

American journalist

- Frederick in 1962
- Born: Pauline Frederick; February 13, 1908; Gallitzin, Pennsylvania, U.S.
- Died: May 9, 1990 (aged 82); Lake Forest, Illinois
- Spouse: Charles Robbins

Pauline Frederick (February 13, 1908 – May 9, 1990) was an American journalist in newspapers, radio and television, as well as co-author of a book in 1941 and sole author of a book in 1967. In her nearly 50-year career, she covered numerous stories ranging from politics and articles of particular interest to women to military conflicts, and public interest pieces. Her career extended from the 1930s until 1981; she is considered one of the pioneering women in journalism.

== Early life ==
Pauline Frederick was born in Gallitzin, Pennsylvania, on February 13, 1908, although several sources state the year as 1906. Her father was Mathew Frederick, a postmaster, and her mother was Catherine Stanley. Her family later relocated to Harrisburg, where she attended high school. Frederick actually began her journalism career as a high school student, winning essay contests and writing for her school and local newspapers. She was her class valedictorian when she graduated in 1926. When Frederick was only eighteen years old, she had to undergo a complete hysterectomy, which left her unable to conceive children. Pauline decided that since she would never be a mother, she would devote all of her time and energy to a career. Upon graduation from high school, she entered American University in Washington, D.C., where she received her bachelor's and master's degrees in political science and international law. “A history professor, however, advised her to ‘leave the law to others’ and go back to journalism". After finishing college at American University, Pauline followed the professor's advice pursuing a career in journalism with great determination, “and within four years she began to receive invitations to White House press events”.

== Professional career ==
In 1931, Frederick set out to get a journalism job and she took an interesting approach: “Because few important men in politics at the time would be interviewed by a woman, she decided to interview the men’s wives”. She interviewed the minister of Czechoslovakia's wife and the wife of the then ambassador of China with hopes that she could sell these interviews and gain some attention in the journalism industry. This is when she may have conceived the idea that she later turned into a book of interviews titled The First Ladies of the World. Hoping for a job, Frederick sent her articles about these women to the editor of the former Washington Star; however, the editor believing that Frederick was the famous actress Pauline Frederick, hired her to boost his newspaper's circulation. “Though not the Frederick he wanted, the Star’s editor was so impressed by her writing that he bought both of the articles she offered and gave her a job churning out a weekly feature”. Frederick began writing articles for the Washington Star. In the mid-1930s, "Frederick was covering the State, War, and Navy Departments for the United States News (later renamed U.S. News & World Report)". A short time after that Frederick was employed as a journalist for the North American Newspaper Alliance. While working for the NANA she had many articles published in the New York Times. The first decade of her journalistic career was a hard-fought grind of hard work and determination. Frederick recalled her early experiences breaking into journalism: “I tried every way I could to convince the powers that be that I could broadcast news… This was very difficult because it was unheard of for a woman to want to enter this man’s world”. Eventually, she would enter the masculine world of broadcast journalism full-time and excel in it.

In 1938, with her interest in electronic communications, she accepted a job as a part-time aide assisting in writing scripts for then-NBC Blue radio reporter H. R. Baukhage. Her journalism career in radio began in 1939, when NBC Radio's director of women's programs, Margaret Cuthhert, heard of Frederick's interviews with diplomats’ wives and thought they would make a good radio feature. Frederick took the job and her interview with the minister of Czechoslovakia's wife was heard on air shortly after Hitler's assault on Czechoslovakia. Frederick continued to work as a newspaper and radio journalist in Washington, D.C., during the next seven years. She authored four chapters in the book America Prepares for Tomorrow. Frederick's career as a serious news journalist began to gain momentum and take off.

In April 1945, Frederick got a tremendous career boost when she was given the opportunity to travel “as a war correspondent on a journalist’s tour of North Africa, Asia, and China nineteen countries in all”. Her first foreign broadcast was done from China. Also on that trip she reported on a USO show with a male-only cast. She was later quoted in 1949 as describing the show as, “the roughest thing I ever heard”.

Frederick is credited with being the first female reporter to broadcast from China. After her war correspondence tour she ended her radio relationship with NBC but continued reporting for newspapers and ABC radio, covering the Nuremberg Trials. However, Frederick only reported “on the air once—when Hermann Göring took the stand and the first-string male reporter was busy doing something else”. Despite her respected work, journalism was still a male-dominated business, and Pauline was not one of the boys. She later remarked on a comment by a male industry executive that a women's voice does not carry authority: “I am terribly sorry that I didn’t have courage enough in those days to tell him that I knew his wife’s voice carried plenty of authority in his house”. Frederick's desire for a career as a news journalist remained strong even though she had been denied a job by NBC and CBS. She retained employment as an independent writer for ABC, furnishing them with articles that were considered women's-interest pieces. While reporting for ABC, Frederick was asked to report on a women's tutorial that was designed to teach women “How to Get a Husband” and that piece became some of her best-known work. She was later quoted as saying about the fluffy women's article “I don’t think I learned anything from it, and I don’t think the audience did either”.

In 1946, she accepted an assignment from ABC to travel to Uruguay to cover the presidential inauguration there. Later that year she landed an assignment to report on the final journey of the RMS Queen Mary as a troop ship; during the cruise she conducted an exclusive interview with General and Mrs. Dwight D. Eisenhower. Of her struggles throughout her career, she once remarked, “all news activities are about people and the ability to cover should not be judged by the sex of the reporter but by the reporting ability”.

In 1948, Frederick was the only reporter available to cover a breaking story at the United Nations, and later that year she was selected to cover the first televised political convention, an experience that gained her instant credibility. In 1949, after years of struggle, Frederick became the “first woman ever to work full-time for a U.S. television Network,” ABC. Also in 1949, she premiered a weekday news program entitled “Pauline Frederick Reports”, and ABC promoted her as the only female commentator broadcasting on-air.

Frederick would continue to work for ABC, covering the Korean crisis and changes in Eastern Europe among many other important news stories, until 1953 when NBC hired her to cover the United Nations. It was in this position that Frederick would become a household name. She covered the United Nations for NBC for twenty-one years, reporting daily on the most critical world issues. Frederick was the United Nations correspondent on air from early in the morning to late at night through the coup crisis in Democratic Republic of the Congo, the Korean War, Middle East turmoil, the Cuban Missile Crisis and the Vietnam War. She was in the middle of every major foreign affairs issue faced by the United States during her tenure as United Nations correspondent. Anchorman Chet Huntley commented about her reporting, “She is our dependable right arm in sorting out the legalities, the propaganda, the nationalistic sensitivities and the international nuances which frequent the UN”.

In 1975, Fredrick retired from NBC, over two years before the network's mandatory retirement age of 70. Although undoubtedly a successful and respected journalist at the end of her career with NBC, her salary was similar to those of other women who, by then, had only been working in television news for less than a year. She continued her career with National Public Radio for another five years until leaving broadcast journalism for good in 1980. When asked to identify her greatest moment at the UN Pauline had some difficulty, explaining that “I’ve been at the United Nations since the beginning, so each one to me was the greatest opportunity, starting with the Korean War, …the Middle East War, the Cuban missile crisis, Suez, Hungary, the Chinese coming into the UN – they’ve all been very exciting.”

== Awards and honors ==
During her long career, Pauline Frederick received numerous awards and honors, and was awarded “honorary doctorate degrees in journalism, law, and the humanities from more than twenty colleges and universities”. As a part-time correspondent in 1946, she became “the first and only woman in television news”, and then, in 1949 “the first woman ever to work fulltime for a U.S. television network” (American Broadcasting Company).

Frederick was included in the Gallup poll's list of most admired women. In 1953, she was awarded the eleventh Alfred I. DuPont Award. In 1954, she became the first women to receive the George Foster Peabody Award for her work in the field of international understanding. “Frederick won the top award from McCall's and the AWRT in 1956 for her ingenious reporting and courage to say what she believed”. In 1960, she won the Golden Mike Award for the second time. She was named to the Hall of Fame of Sigma Delta Chi, the journalism professional society, in 1975, and was the first woman to be elected as president of the United Nations Correspondents Association. In 1980, Pauline was awarded the Paul White Award from the Radio-Television News Directors Association; she was the first woman ever to receive this honor.

== Personal life ==
Early in her career, Frederick had kept so busy with journalism that she had never made time for a personal life of her own. She married Charles Robbins on March 31, 1969. Robbins had been the managing editor of the Wall Street Journal and later the president of the Atomic Industrial Forum.

Frederick retired from journalism in 1981 and moved with her husband to Sarasota, Florida. In retirement, Frederick lectured on the mission of the United Nations and international affairs. Charles Robbins died in August 1989.

== Death ==
Frederick died of a heart attack while visiting relatives on May 9, 1990, in Lake Forest, Illinois. She was 82.

== Publications ==
=== Ten First Ladies of the World ===
Pauline Frederick published a book of interviews with ten first wives in 1967. The book includes interviews with Indira Gandhi of India, Lady Bird Johnson of the United States, Mary Wilson of the United Kingdom, Yvonne de Gaulle of France, Carmen Polo de Franco of Spain, Jovanka Broz Tito of Yugoslavia, Tahia Nasser of the United Arab Republic, Fathia Nkrumah of Ghana, Daw Thein Tin (Mme. Thant) of the United Nations and Imelda Romualdez Marcos of the Republic of the Philippines. Speaking of why she selected these particular woman, Frederick remarked in her introduction, “With the exception of Indira Gandhi who, as Prime Minister of India, is uniquely a first lady in her own right, the women portrayed are wives of men who exercise national power, exert regional political influence, and in some cases, are world shakers”. Pauline was personally aware of the forces working against women through her own experiences, and it is telling that she concluded her first interview with Indira Gandhi with a universal quote applicable to all women fighting to succeed in a male dominated world: “It is a question of being a human being, not a man or a woman”.

=== America Prepares for Tomorrow, The Story of Our Total Defense Effort ===
In 1941, Pauline Frederick co-authored with William Dow Boutwell, B.P. Brodinsky, Joseph Pratt Harris, Glenn Nixon, and Archibald Robertson, America Prepares for Tomorrow. Frederick authored four chapters – Chapter Four, Aid to the Democracies; Chapter Twenty-Two, The Bread and Butter Line; Chapter Twenty-Three, Sitting on the Price Lid, and Chapter Twenty-Six, The Inner Lines – Problems of Propaganda and Sabotage, and provided research for Chapter Five. This early in her career, she is clearly considered an equal to her male co-authors. In the About the Authors section of the book, Pauline Frederick is credited with specializing in foreign affairs and editing the Federal Register. In her chapters, Pauline tackles the changing attitudes of isolationism in America, the consumer's relationship to national defense, the economics at home of building the weapons of war, and defending the American way of life. Even this early in her career, Pauline Fredrick was recognized by some as a journalist and author capable of writing and reporting on serious news topics. At this point, most women in the field of journalism and, the female gender as a whole were not considered capable of performing such tasks.

=== Newspaper reporting ===
Pauline Frederick authored hundreds of newspaper articles over the course of her distinguished career. In keeping with the sexist practices of the time, most of her assignments were focused on women's issues. In the male-dominated field of journalism, a female reporter was not felt capable or respected enough to cover anything other than stories concerning feminine issues. Still, Frederick made her mark writing about significant news in relation to women. Her newspaper credits for the New York Times during 1938 and 1939 are a wonderful example of how she incorporated the women she was covering into articles about the most important issues of the day. For example, she wrote about neutrality prior to the United States entering World War II in her article Representative Edith Rogers Asks Women To Help Country to Be Really Neutral (Apr 30, 1939).

== Legacy ==
When Frederick began presenting the news on television, she was the only female doing so. In the early 1970s, NBC had four female correspondents, including Frederick. Her fellow female correspondents were Nancy Dickerson, Aline Saarinen and Liz Trotta. Marya McLaughlin was the sole woman at CBS, while ABC had two, Virginia Sherwood and Marlene Sanders. A CBS executive remarked concerning these pioneers: "The few women who were in television news proved to be outstanding and I think they really paved the way in a way that we really can’t appreciate … Pauline Frederick at NBC – they were knocking down those old barriers about, she’s not believable, she can’t keep up, she can’t do that and, by God, every time she came on she was keeping up."

== Timeline ==
- 1908 February 13 - Born in Gallitzin, Pennsylvania.
- 1926 - Graduated from Central High School, Harrisburg, Pennsylvania.
- 1930 - Graduated from American University.
- 1931 - First professional reporting position for the Washington Star.
- 1933-34 - Taught at Fairmont Junior College, Washington, D.C.
- 1939 - Broadcast on-air for NBC Radio.
- 1941 - Co-authored America Prepares for Tomorrow
- 1944 - Stopped working for NBC Radio.
- 1945 - Performed overseas broadcast covering the Nuremberg Trials.
- 1945 April - Served on journalism tour of Asia as a war correspondent.
- 1947 September 26 - Started regularly covering the United Nations.
- 1948 - Becomes a freelance reporter for ABC.
- 1948 June – July - Covered the first political convention on television for ABC.
- 1948 August - Pauline Fredrick's Featured Story premiered on ABC in New York City.
- 1949 - Employed full-time as a reporter for a television network ABC.
- 1949 January 12 - Pauline Fredrick's Featured Story aired nationally for the first time.
- 1949 April 13 - Pauline Fredrick's Featured Story final episode was broadcast.
- 1950 - Reported from the United Nations on the conflict in Korea.
- 1952 October - All Star News premiered on ABC featuring Pauline Frederick.
- 1953 June - Left her position at ABC for a position at NBC.
- 1953 August - Reported for NBC on the national political conventions.
- 1954 - Received the Alfred I. duPont Award.
- 1955 - Received the Peabody Award.
- 1959 - Elected president of the United Nations Correspondents Association.
- 1956 August - Reported for NBC on the political conventions.
- 1963 August - Covered the political unrest in the Democratic Republic of the Congo for NBC.
- 1967 - Published Ten First Ladies of the World.
- 1969 March 31 - Married Charles Robbins.
- 1975 - NBC retired Pauline Frederick.
- 1976 October - Was the first woman to moderate a presidential debate.
- 1977 January - Started for NPR on the Pauline Fredrick and Colleagues show.
- 1981 - Left NPR and broadcast journalism.
- 1989 August - Charles Robbins, her husband died.
- 1990 May 9 - Died in Lake Forest, Illinois.
