= Ann Compton =

American journalist (born 1947)

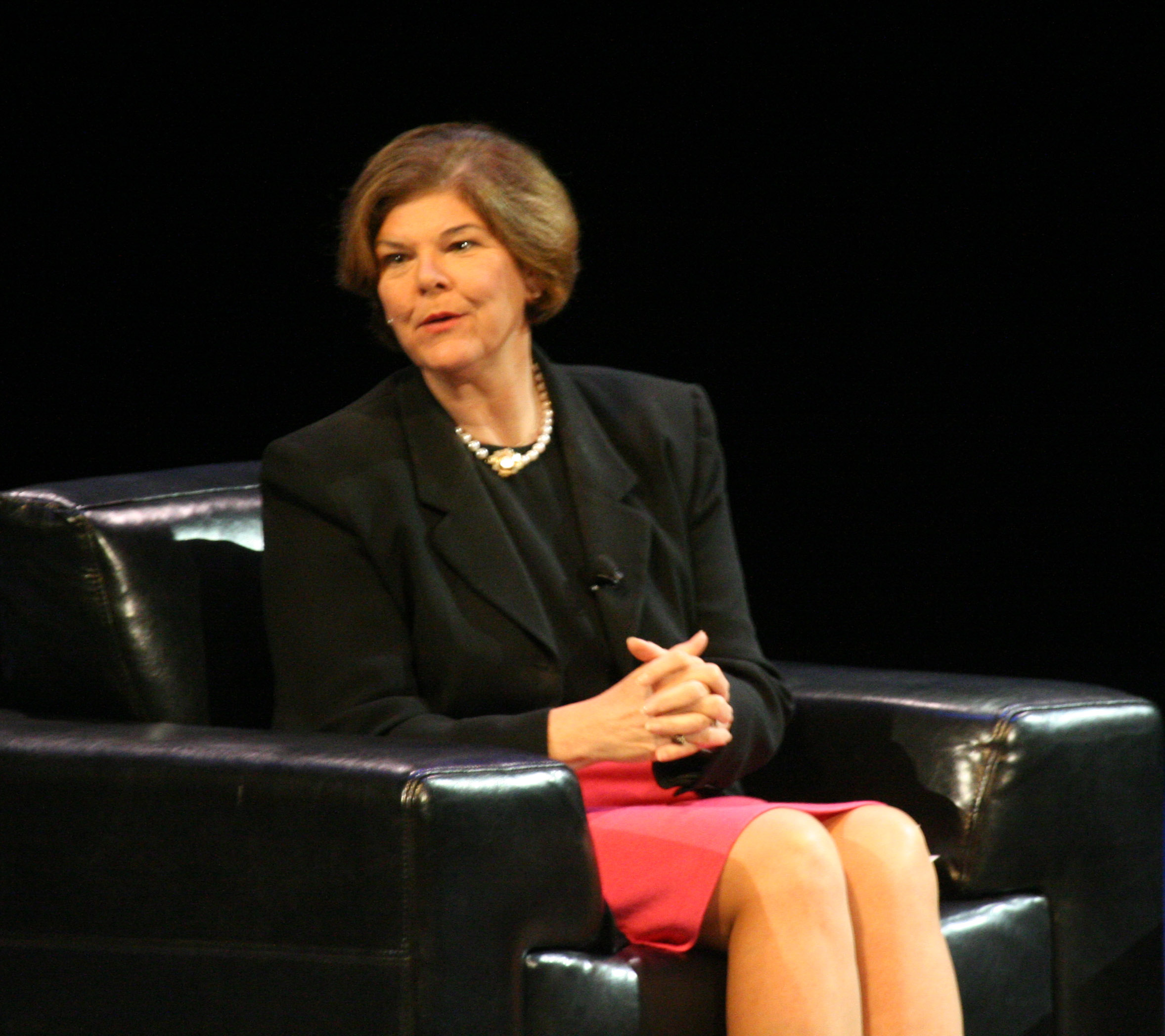
- Compton in 2007
- Born: January 19, 1947 (age 79); Chicago, Illinois, U.S.
- Education: Hollins College
- Occupations: News reporter, writer
- Years active: 1970–2014
- Employer: ABC News
- Known for: White House correspondent
- Spouse: William Hughes

Ann Compton (born January 19, 1947) is an American retired news reporter and White House correspondent for ABC News Radio.

== Career highlights ==
Ann Compton graduated from New Trier High School in Winnetka, Illinois, in 1965. She began her broadcasting career in Virginia, where an internship during her junior year at Hollins College led to a full-time job as the first woman reporting for WDBJ TV, a CBS affiliate in Roanoke. She established a State Capitol Bureau in Richmond for the station. In 1973, ABC News hired her and she reported from New York City until December 1974, when she was assigned to the White House.

While reporting for ABC News, Compton traveled around the globe and through all 50 states with presidents, vice presidents, and first ladies through seven presidential campaigns, and, as a White House correspondent, she covered seven presidents, beginning with Gerald Ford. Weeks after the Watergate scandal came to an end, Compton became the first woman assigned to cover the White House on a full-time basis by a network television news organization, and she was one of the youngest to receive the assignment.

Twice during campaigns she was invited to serve as a panelist for presidential debates (1988 and 1992) and she was assigned as a floor reporter at the 1976 Republican and Democratic national conventions. In 2000, Compton was the chief Washington correspondent for ABCNEWS.com, where she wrote and anchored a daily political column, "On Background."

During the terrorist attacks on September 11, 2001, Compton, among other reporters, was with U.S. President George W. Bush covering his trip to Florida to promote his education agenda. As the attacks unfolded, Compton was aboard Air Force One while the plane flew from Florida to other various parts of the country after the President was advised not to return to Washington.

Compton retired from ABC News on September 10, 2014, 41 years to the day after she began at the network.

== Awards and associations ==
Compton was the chairman of the governing board of the Radio Television Correspondents Association in 1987-88 and served on the advisory board of the Freedom Forum Media Studies Center in New York.

In June 2000, she was inducted into the Journalism Hall of Fame by the Society of Professional Journalists. On November 5, 2005, she was inducted into the National Radio Hall of Fame. In 2006 she was inducted into Omicron Delta Kappa as an honoris causa initiate at the University of Maryland College Park.

Compton was part of the team awarded the prestigious Silver Baton Alfred I. duPont Columbia University Award for the network's coverage of September 11, 2001. Her coverage of September 11 was also recognized in ABC News' Emmy and Peabody awards.

In 2013, Compton was named one of the Library of Virginia's "Virginia Women in History".

She has served as chairwoman of the governing board of the Radio and Television Correspondents Association and has served on the advisory board of the Freedom Forum Media Studies Center.

She is a former president of the White House Correspondents' Association.

Despite her many achievements and commitments, Compton said that her most valued award is a golden statuette from the National Mothers' Day Committee naming her a Mother of the Year in 1988.

== Personal life ==
Compton is married to Dr. William Hughes, a Washington, D.C. physician specializing in gastroenterology. They are the parents of three sons and a daughter.
