= Wait Chapel =

University chapel in North Carolina, US

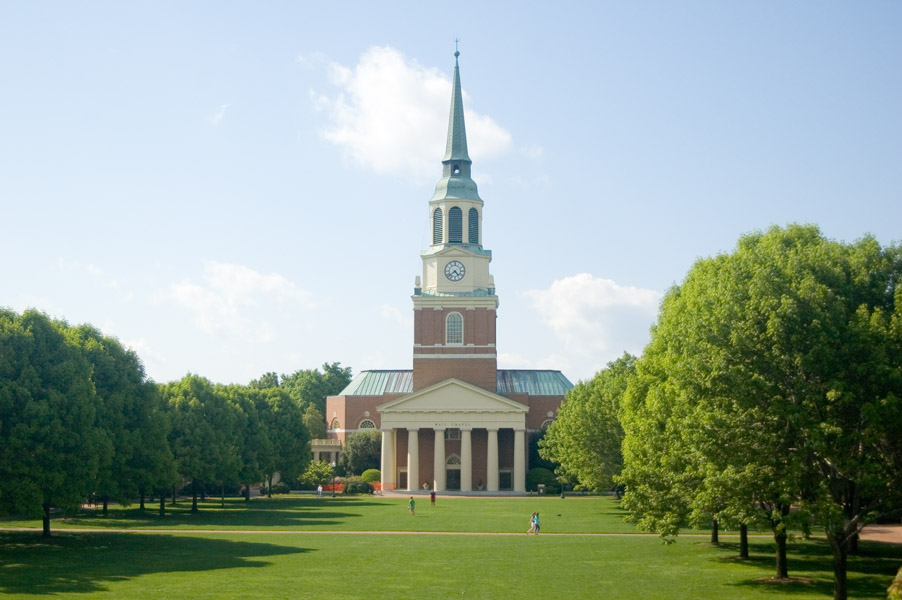
- Wait Chapel's distinctive edifice dominates the main quad at Wake Forest University
- Wait Chapel
- 36.13508°N 80.27885°W
- Location: Hearn Plaza
- Address: Wake Forest University
- Denomination: Baptist

Architecture
- Completed: 1956 (70 years ago)

Wait Chapel is a building on the campus of Wake Forest University. The first building constructed on the university's Reynolda campus, in October 1956, it is named for Samuel Wait, the university's first president. Its steeple reaches to 213 feet (65 m). The chapel stands on the northeastern side of Hearn Plaza (Upper Quad), opposite Reynolda Hall.

The chapel, which seats 2,250 people, houses the Janet Jeffrey Carlile Harris Carillon of 48 bells and the Williams Organ, donated by Walter McAdoo Williams, namesake of Walter M. Williams High School.

Dr. Martin Luther King Jr. spoke at Wait Chapel on October 11, 1962. On March 17, 1978, president Jimmy Carter made a major National Security address in the chapel. In 1988, it hosted a presidential debate between George H. W. Bush and Michael Dukakis and, in 2000, between George W. Bush and Al Gore. On September 13, 2007, it hosted a broadcast of National Public Radio (NPR) show Wait, Wait, Don't Tell Me. Robert F. Kennedy Jr. spoke here in November 2011. A private memorial ceremony for Dr. Maya Angelou was held in Wait Chapel on June 7, 2014. Attendees included first lady Michelle Obama, president Bill Clinton, and Oprah Winfrey.

The chapel is linked to a vast underground series of tunnels crisscrossing the campus carrying utilities.

The congregation of Wake Forest Baptist Church once held regular Sunday services in the chapel; the church dissolved in 2022. In the late 1990s the chapel became the center of controversy when members of the church decided to conduct a same-sex commitment ceremony; this became the subject of the documentary A Union in Wait. Other events held in the chapel throughout the year include a Moravian lovefeast during the Christmas season.
