= Commission on Presidential Debates =

Bi-partisan U.S. presidential debate organizing group formed in 1987

- Predecessor: League of Women Voters (sponsor)
- Formation: 1987; 39 years ago
- Type: Non-profit, 501(c)(3) corporation
- Purpose: Organization of the United States presidential and vice-presidential election debates
- Co-Chairs: Frank Fahrenkopf; Dorothy S. Ridings; Kenneth Wollack
- Executive Director: Janet H. Brown
- Website: www.debates.org

The Commission on Presidential Debates (CPD) is a nonprofit corporation established in 1987 under the joint sponsorship of the Democratic and Republican political parties in the United States. The CPD sponsors and produces debates for U.S. presidential and vice-presidential candidates and undertakes research and educational activities relating to the debates. Between 1988 and 2020, the CPD organized all general election presidential debates.

In 2024, the campaigns of the major-party presumptive presidential candidates, Democratic incumbent Joe Biden and Republican former president Donald Trump, circumvented the CPD and committed to two debates outside the CPD's purview. When Vice President Kamala Harris replaced Biden as the Democratic nominee after the first debate, she and Trump maintained the commitment to the second debate outside the CPD's purview.

== History ==
=== Debates before the CPD ===
The first televised presidential debates were held between Richard Nixon and John F. Kennedy during the 1960 campaign. No general election debates were held in 1964, and Nixon refused to participate in any debate in 1968 and 1972. Beginning with the 1976 election, the League of Women Voters sponsored the televised Gerald Ford–Jimmy Carter debates, followed by the John B. Anderson–Ronald Reagan and Carter–Reagan debates for the 1980 election, and the Reagan–Walter Mondale in 1984.

=== Formation ===
After studying the election process in 1985, the bipartisan National Commission on Elections recommended "[t]urning over the sponsorship of presidential debates to the two major parties". The CPD was established in 1987 by the chairmen of the Democratic and Republican Parties to "take control of the presidential debates". The commission was staffed by members from the two parties and chaired by the heads of the Democratic and Republican parties, Paul G. Kirk and Frank Fahrenkopf. At a 1987 press conference announcing the commission's creation, Fahrenkopf said that the commission was not likely to include third-party candidates in debates, and Kirk said he personally believed they should be excluded from the debates.

In 1988, the League of Women Voters withdrew its sponsorship of the presidential debates after the George H. W. Bush and Michael Dukakis campaigns secretly agreed to a "memorandum of understanding" that would decide which candidates could participate in the debates, which individuals would be panelists (and therefore able to ask questions), and the height of the lecterns. The league rejected the demands and released a statement saying that it was withdrawing support for the debates because "the demands of the two campaign organizations would perpetrate a fraud on the American voter."

=== Debate format and venues ===
The CPD sponsored the debates in every presidential election from 1988 through 2020. Debates ran 90 minutes long, with no commercial interruptions.

Of the 33 debates conducted under its sponsorship, 30 were held on college or university campuses. Washington University in St. Louis hosted more presidential and vice-presidential debates than any other institution.

=== 2024 presidential election ===
In January 2022, the Republican National Committee (RNC) warned the CPD that it planned to amend the Rules of the Republican Party to prohibit Republican presidential nominees from attending CPD-sponsored debates. The RNC unanimously passed the amendment to quit the CPD in April 2022.

In November 2023, the CPD announced its plans for debate dates and sites for the 2024 presidential election, with three presidential debates (to be held on September 16, October 1, and October 9) and one vice presidential debate (to be held September 25). However, the campaigns of both President Joe Biden and his challenger, former president Donald Trump, criticized the CPD's plans, including over format and timing (i.e., concerns that the debates would be held too late in the campaign season).

In May 2024, the Biden and Trump campaigns struck a deal to circumvent the CPD and participate in two debates (on CNN on June 27 and ABC on September 10), breaking a longstanding tradition of debates organized under the auspices of the CPD, throwing the future of the CPD into doubt. On June 24, 2024, the CPD announced that it was "regrettably" releasing the sites it had selected for its 2024 debates from their contracts, adding that "CPD stands ready to sponsor 2024 debates should circumstances change."

== Leadership and funding ==
The commission is a nonprofit organization, led by a bipartisan board of directors. It has 501(c)(3) status.

As of 2024, the co-chairs of the commission were Frank Fahrenkopf (a former chairman of the Republican National Committee) and Antonia Hernández. Fahrenkopf has been co-chair since the CPD was established. The other co-chair was originally Paul G. Kirk, Jr., who served as chairman of the Democratic National Committee. Kirk stepped down from the CPD in 2009, and was replaced as co-chair by Michael D. McCurry. McCurry stepped down as co-chair in January 2017, and was replaced by Dorothy S. Ridings, a past executive of the Council on Foundations and League of Women Voters. Kirk and Ridings hold the title Co-Chair Emeriti. Kenneth Wollack, former president of the National Democratic Institute, was appointed as a third co-chair in 2019. Hernandez, formerly a CPD vice-chair, was selected as co-chair in 2022.

As of 2024, the commission's board consists of eight members: Roy Blunt (former Republican senator from Missouri), Charles Gibson (a longtime television journalist, formerly of ABC News), John Griffen (managing director of Allen & Co.); the Reverend John I. Jenkins (the president of the University of Notre Dame), Monica C. Lozano (the president and CEO of the College Futures Foundation), Richard D. Parsons (a cable executive), Rajiv J. Shah (the president of the Rockefeller Foundation and former administrator of USAID), and Olympia Snowe (former Republican senator from Maine).

Past board members include John C. Danforth (former Republican senator from Missouri), Yvonne Hao (an investor and businesswoman), Jane Harman (a former Democratic congresswoman who later became director of the Woodrow Wilson Center) and Newton N. Minow (a former member of the Federal Communications Commission during the John F. Kennedy administration). Other past board members include Shirley M. Tilghman, Richard Moe, Kay Orr, Leon E. Panetta, Mitch Daniels, and Caroline B. Kennedy.

Janet H. Brown has served as the CPD's executive director since the commission was established in 1987.

The commission's debates are sponsored by private contributions from foundations and corporations as well as fees from hosting institutions.

== Complaints from third parties ==
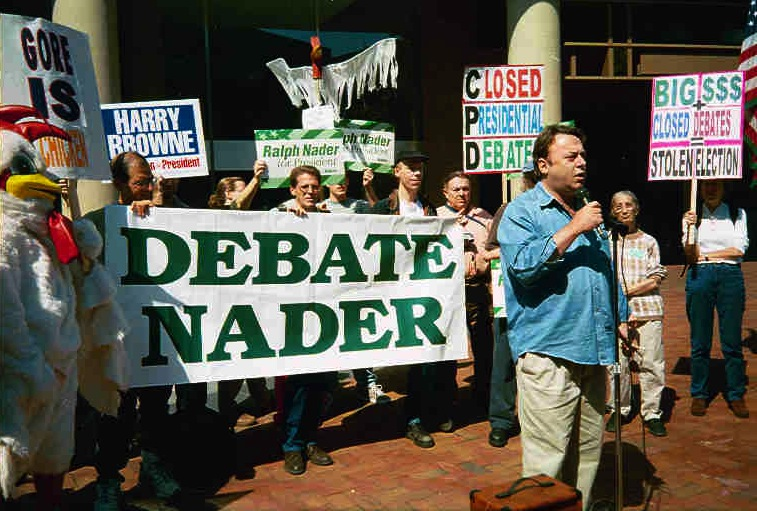
Christopher Hitchens speaking at a September 2000 third-party protest at the commission's headquarters

Third parties have often criticized exclusion of their candidates from debates, due to the CPD's rule (established in 2000) that candidates must garner at least 15% support across five national polls to be invited to the national debates. The last candidate from outside the two major parties to participate in a CPD-sponsored debate was Ross Perot, who polled sufficiently high in his 1992 presidential campaign to debate George H. W. Bush and Bill Clinton in all three debates; Perot's running mate, James Stockdale, also participated in the vice presidential debate. When Perot ran again in 1996, the CPD declined to invite him to the debates, finding that the Reform Party candidate had no "realistic chance to win" the election.

Multiple lawsuits have been filed by third-party candidates challenging the CPD's policy of requiring a candidate to have 15% support in national polls to be included in presidential debates; all have been rejected by the courts.

In October 2004, Libertarian candidate Michael Badnarik and Green Party candidate David Cobb were arrested while protesting against CPD for excluding third-party candidates from the nationally televised debates in St. Louis, Missouri. In October 2012, Green Party presidential nominee Jill Stein and vice-presidential nominee Cheri Honkala were arrested for disorderly conduct while trying to take part in the second presidential debate at Hofstra University in Hempstead, New York.
