= 1967 Pulitzer Prize =

Awards for journalism and related fields

The following are the Pulitzer Prizes for 1967.

== Journalism awards ==
- Public Service:
  - The Milwaukee Journal, for its successful campaign to stiffen the law against water pollution in Wisconsin, a notable advance in the national effort for the conservation of natural resources.
  - Louisville Courier-Journal, for its successful campaign to control the Kentucky strip mining industry, a notable advance in the national effort for the conservation of natural resources.
- Local General or Spot News Reporting:
  - Robert V. Cox of the Chambersburg Public Opinion (Pennsylvania), for his vivid deadline reporting of a mountain manhunt that ended with the killing of a deranged sniper who had terrorized the community.
- Local Investigative Specialized Reporting:
  - Gene Miller of The Miami Herald, whose initiative and investigative reporting helped to free two persons wrongfully convicted of murder.
- National Reporting:
  - Stanley Penn and Monroe Karmin of The Wall Street Journal, for their investigative reporting of the connection between American crime and gambling in the Bahamas.
- International Reporting:
  - R. John Hughes of The Christian Science Monitor, for his thorough reporting of the attempted Communist coup in Indonesia in 1965 and the purge that followed in 1965-66.
- Editorial Writing:
  - Eugene Patterson of the Atlanta Constitution, for his editorials during the year.
- Editorial Cartooning:
  - Patrick Oliphant of The Denver Post, for "They Won't Get Us To The Conference Table... Will They?", published February 1, 1966.

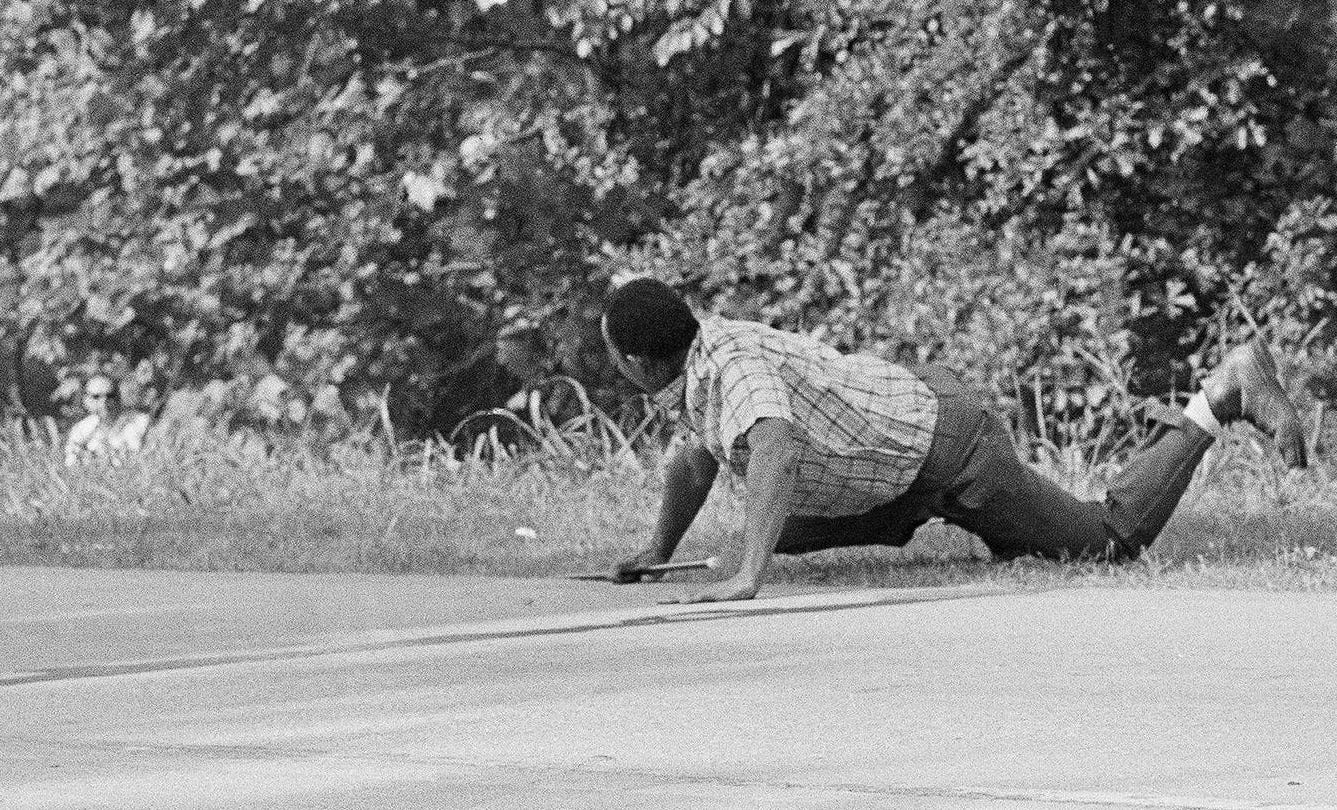
The prize-winning photograph

- Photography:
  - Jack R. Thornell of the Associated Press, New Orleans bureau, for his picture of the shooting of James Meredith in Mississippi by a roadside rifleman.

== Letters, Drama and Music awards ==
- Fiction:
  - The Fixer by Bernard Malamud (Farrar).
- Drama:
  - A Delicate Balance by Edward Albee (Atheneum).
- History:
  - Exploration and Empire: The Explorer and the Scientist in the Winning of the American West by William H. Goetzmann (Knopf).
- Biography or Autobiography:
  - Mr. Clemens and Mark Twain by Justin Kaplan (Simon & Schuster).
- Poetry:
  - Live or Die by Anne Sexton (Houghton).
- General Nonfiction:
  - The Problem of Slavery in Western Culture by David Brion Davis (Cornell University Press).
- Music:
  - Quartet No. 3 by Leon Kirchner (Associated Music Publishers), first performed by the Beaux Arts Quartet in The Town Hall, January 27, 1967
