= 1992 United States presidential debates =

Part of the 1992 U.S. presidential election

- October 11, 1992; October 15, 1992; October 19, 1992
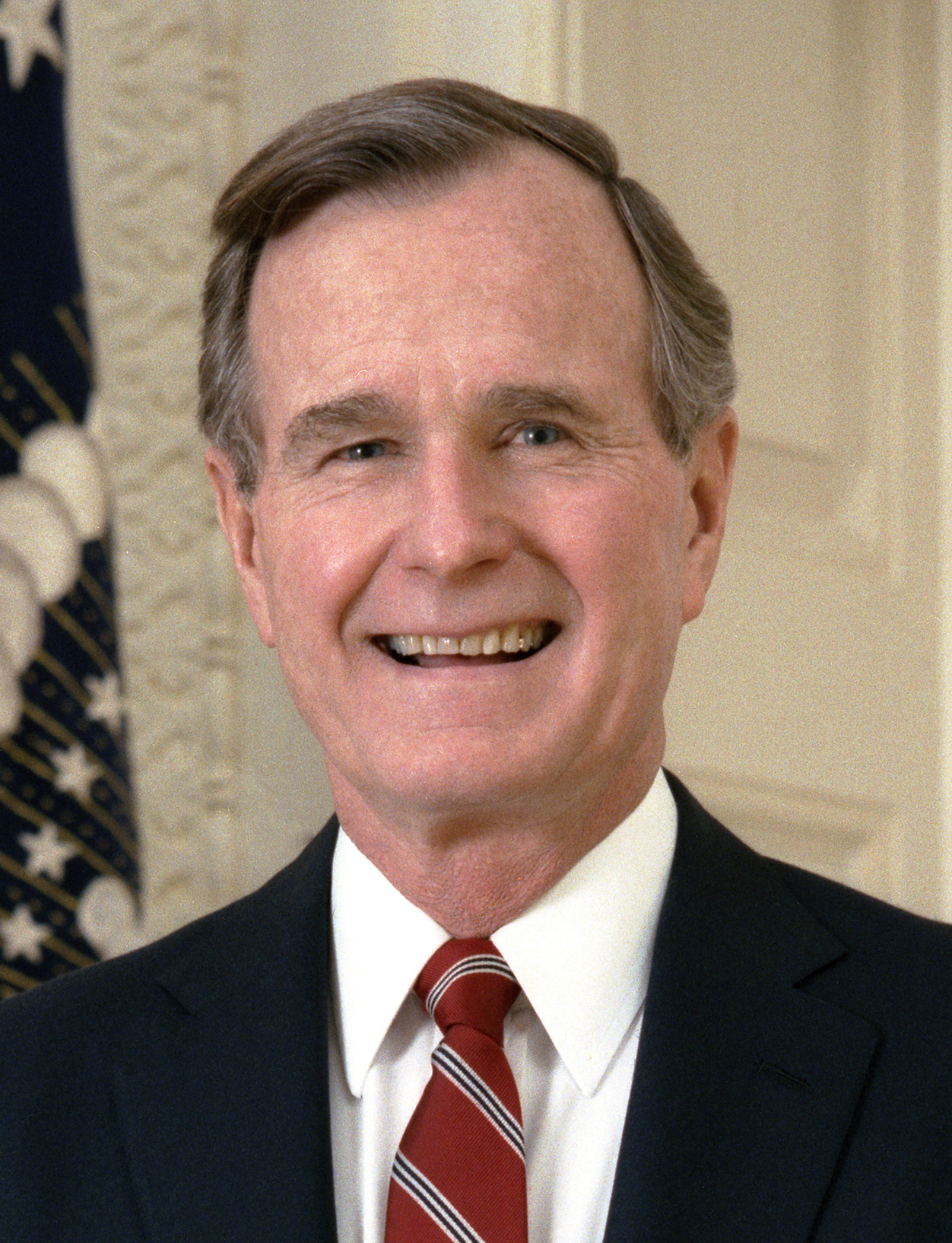

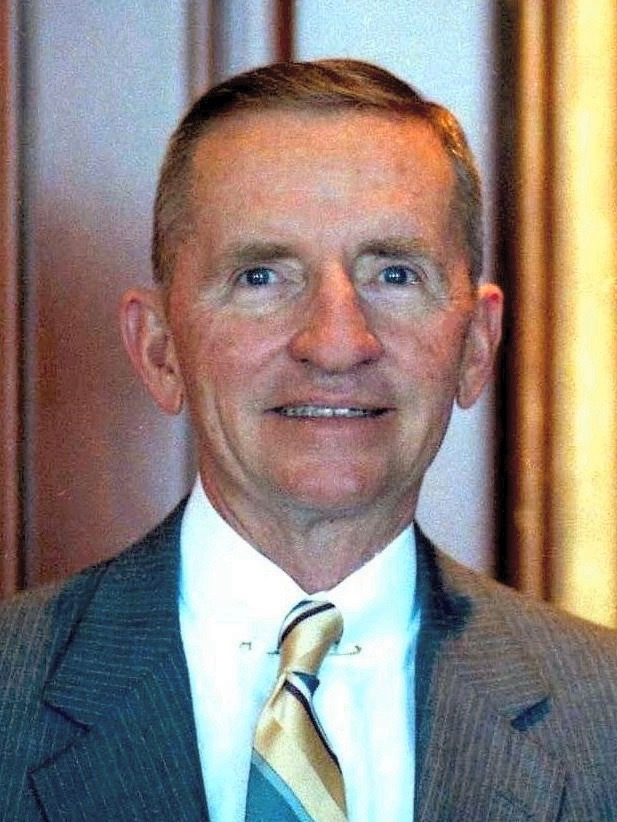
| Nominee | George H. W. Bush | Bill Clinton | Ross Perot |
| Party | Republican | Democratic | Independent |
| Home state | Texas | Arkansas | Texas |
- 1992 United States vice presidential debate
- October 13, 1992
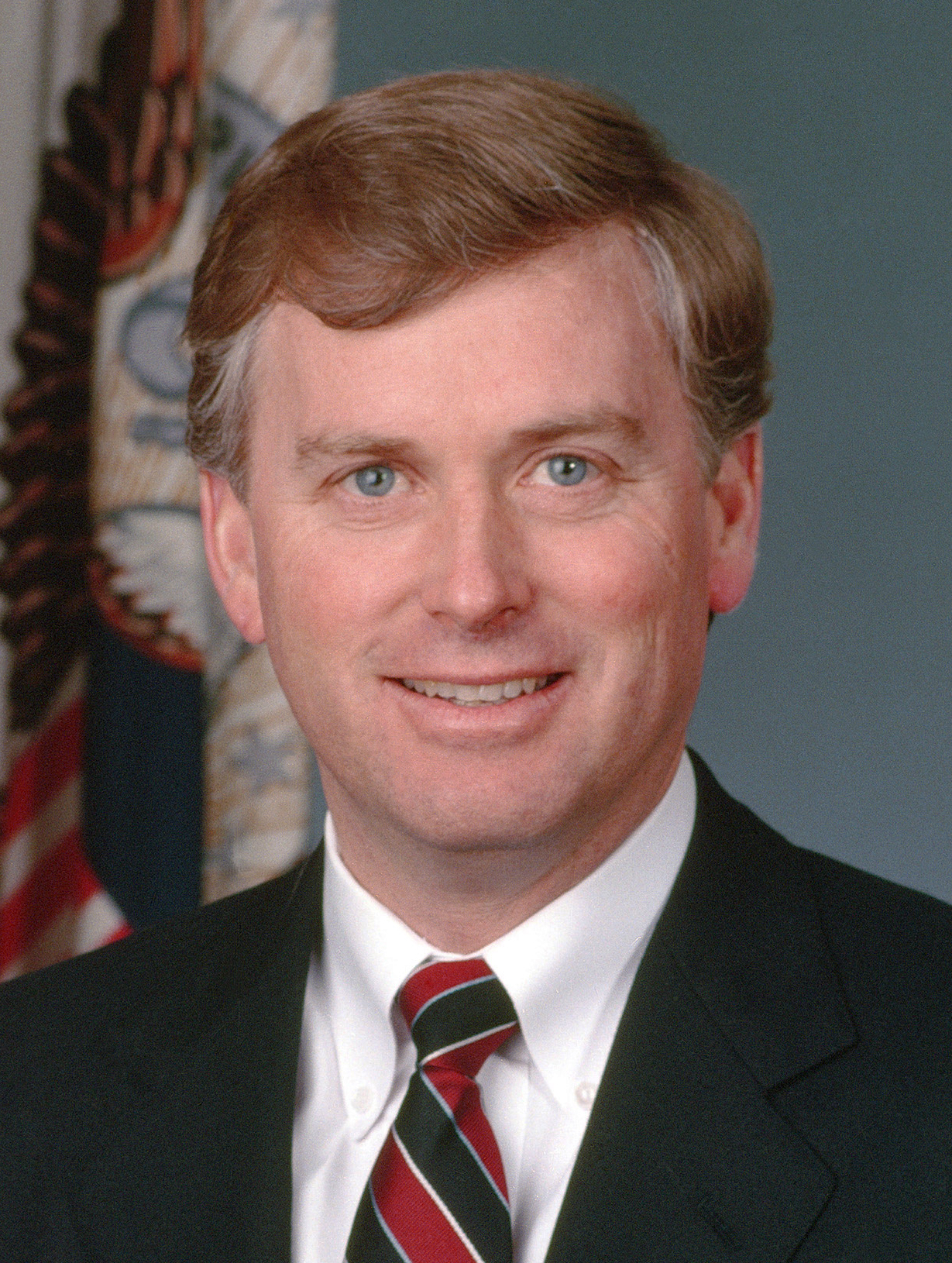

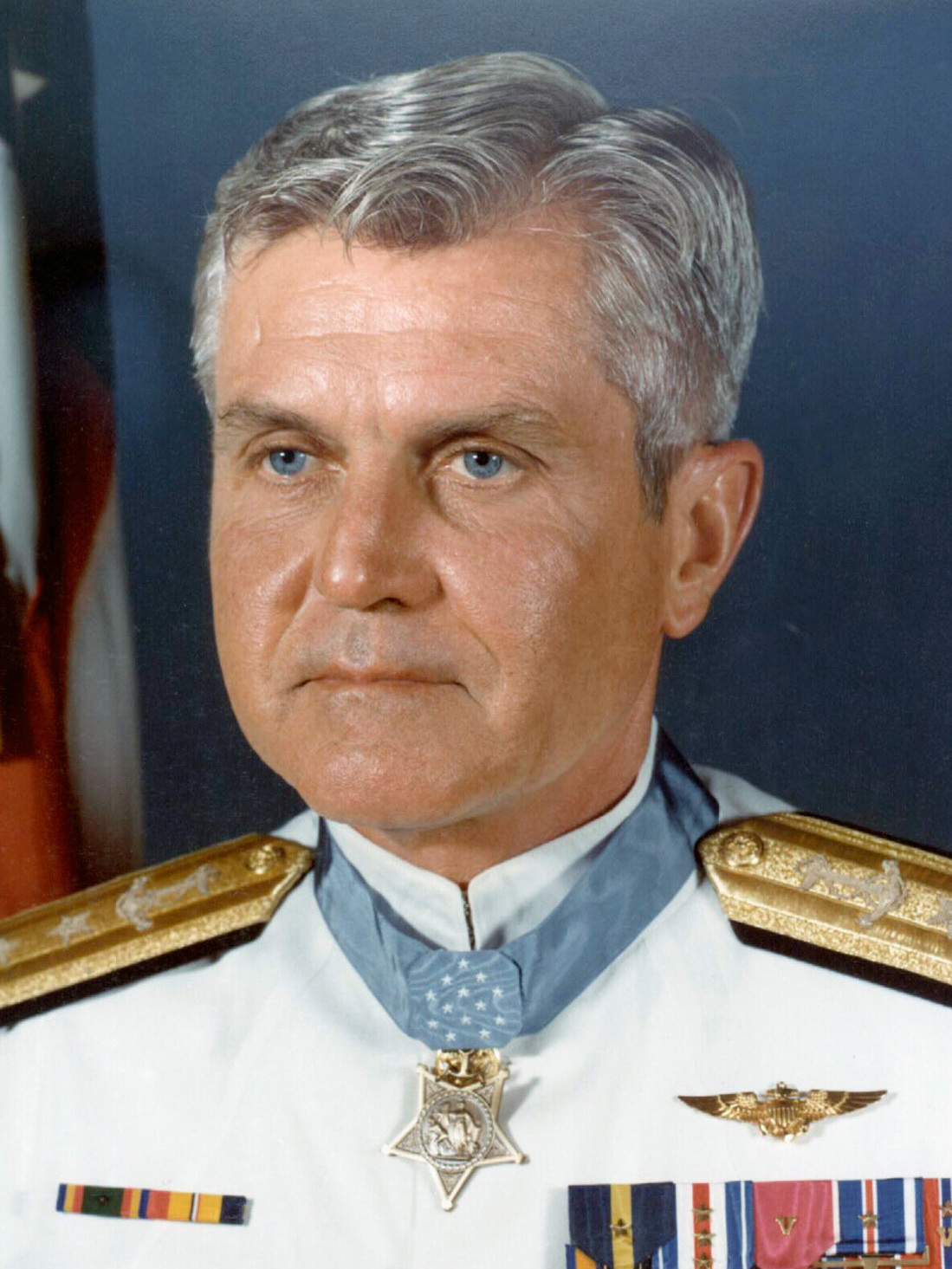
| Nominee | Dan Quayle | Al Gore | James Stockdale |
| Party | Republican | Democratic | Independent |
| Home state | Indiana | Tennessee | California |

The 1992 United States presidential debates were a series of debates held during the 1992 presidential election.

The Commission on Presidential Debates (CPD), a bipartisan organization formed in 1987, organized four debates among the major party candidates, sponsoring three presidential debates and one vice presidential debate. Republican nominee George H. W. Bush, Democratic nominee Bill Clinton, and Independent candidate Ross Perot met the criteria for inclusion in the debates. The CPD-sponsored vice presidential debate took place between their respective vice presidential running mates, Dan Quayle, Al Gore, and James Stockdale.

As of 2024, these are the only and the most recent debates where a third-party candidate was in.

== Debate schedule ==
1992 United States presidential election debates
| No. | Date & time | Host | Location | Moderator | Participants | | |
| Key: P Participant. N Non-invitee. | | | | | Democratic | Republican | Independent |
| Key: P Participant. N Non-invitee. | | | | | Governor Bill Clinton of Arkansas | President George H. W. Bush of Texas | Businessman Ross Perot of Texas |
|---|---|---|---|---|---|---|---|
| 1 | Sunday, October 11, 1992; 8:00 – 9:30 p.m. EDT | Washington University in St. Louis | St. Louis, Missouri | Jim Lehrer of PBS | P | P | P |
| 2 | Thursday, October 15, 1992; 9:00 – 10:30 p.m. EDT | University of Richmond | Richmond, Virginia | Carole Simpson of ABC | P | P | P |
| 3 | Monday, October 19, 1992; 9:00 – 10:30 p.m. EDT | Michigan State University | East Lansing, Michigan | Jim Lehrer of PBS | P | P | P |
1992 United States vice presidential debate
| No. | Date & time | Host | Location | Moderator | Participants | | |
| Key: P Participant. N Non-invitee. | | | | | Democratic | Republican | Independent |
| Key: P Participant. N Non-invitee. | | | | | Senator Al Gore of Tennessee | Vice President Dan Quayle of Indiana | Ret. Vice Admiral James Stockdale of California |
| VP | Tuesday, October 13, 1992; 7:00 – 8:30 p.m. EDT | Georgia Tech | Atlanta, Georgia | Hal Bruno of ABC | P | P | P |

== September 22: Canceled first debate ==
The first presidential debate was initially scheduled for September 22 at Michigan State University. At that time, Ross Perot's third-party campaign was inactive and would not be revived until October 1, so only Bush and Clinton were expected to participate. The Bush campaign disagreed with some of the changes the CPD had made since the 1988 debates, such as the decision to have one moderator host the debate instead of a panel, the planned three debates instead of two, and the lack of direct negotiation between the participating campaigns. By September 16, only the Clinton campaign had agreed to participate, so the first debate was canceled.

== October 11: First presidential debate (Washington University in St. Louis) ==
First presidential debate
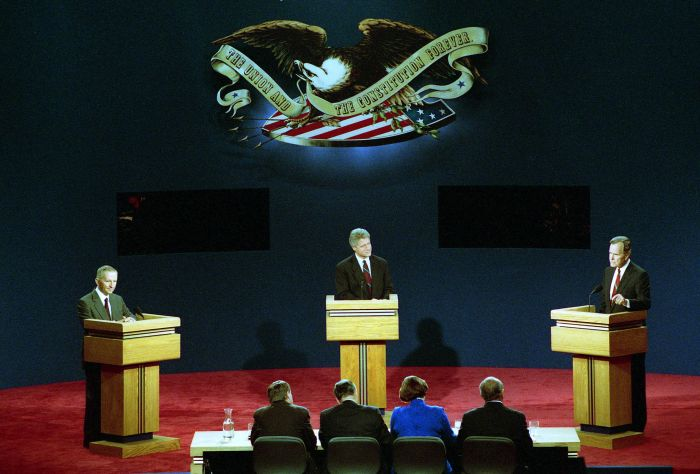
- Date(s): October 11, 1992
- Duration: 90 minutes
- Venue: Washington University in St. Louis
- Location: St. Louis, Missouri
- Participants: George H. W. Bush; Bill Clinton; Ross Perot
- Moderator(s): Jim Lehrer of PBS
- Transcript: First half, second half

Full video of the first presidential debate

The first presidential debate between President George H. W. Bush, Governor Bill Clinton, and Businessman Ross Perot took place on Sunday, October 11, 1992, at the Field House, Washington University in St. Louis, Missouri.

The debate was moderated by Jim Lehrer of PBS with Sander Vanocur, Ann Compton and John Mashek as panelists.

Questions were divided between foreign and domestic policy. It was the first time three candidates shared a single stage in a televised debate. A poll conducted by CNN/USA TODAY on October 11, 1992, found that of those watching, 47 percent rated Perot the winner, 30 percent voted Clinton and 16 percent voted Bush. The format decided was:

- No opening statements
- each candidate questioned in turn with two minutes to respond
- one minute rebuttal by other candidates
- two minute closing statements.

=== Viewership ===
An estimated 62.4 million viewers tuned into the debate.

== October 13: Vice presidential debate (Georgia Tech) ==
Vice presidential debate
- Date(s): October 13, 1992
- Duration: 90 minutes
- Venue: Georgia Tech
- Location: Atlanta, Georgia
- Participants: Dan Quayle; Al Gore; James Stockdale
- Moderator(s): Hal Bruno of ABC
- Transcript: Full debate

The only vice presidential debate between Vice President Dan Quayle, Senator Al Gore, and Ret. Vice Admiral James Stockdale took place on Thursday, October 13, 1992, at Georgia Tech in Atlanta, Georgia.

The debate was moderated by Hal Bruno of ABC. The debate would become known for unusual responses and negative rhetoric from the candidates and the audience. It would later be called "the most combative debate in the 32-year history of the televised forums" by the Washington Post. One of the most memorable moments from the debate came early in the night. Bruno, in his capacity as debate moderator, asked James Stockdale, "Admiral Stockdale, your opening statement, please, sir?" Stockdale famously replied to Bruno's request: "Who am I? Why am I here?" Bruno also scolded the debate's audience when they jeered candidates Quayle and Gore, saying, "There’s no call for that ... so knock that off."

The format decided was:

- two minute opening statements
- issue presented to candidates with one minute
- 15 seconds to respond
- five minute discussion period about same topic followed
- two minute closing statements.

=== Viewership ===
An estimated 51.2 million viewers tuned into the debate.

== October 15: Second presidential debate (University of Richmond) ==
Second presidential debate
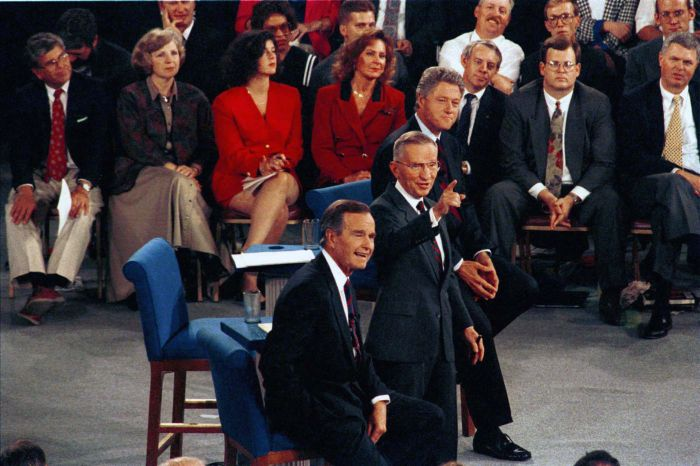
- Date(s): October 15, 1992
- Duration: 90 minutes
- Venue: University of Richmond
- Location: Richmond, Virginia
- Participants: George H. W. Bush; Bill Clinton; Ross Perot
- Moderator(s): Carole Simpson of ABC
- Transcript: First half, Second half

The second presidential debate between President George H. W. Bush, Governor Bill Clinton, and Businessman Ross Perot took place on October 15, 1992, at University of Richmond in Richmond, Virginia.

The town hall style debate was moderated by Carole Simpson of ABC with 109 uncommitted voters as questioners. Questions were focused primarily on domestic issues and the economy, although no subject was restricted.

The "Giant sucking sound" is a famous phrase coined by Perot during the 1992 debates to warn that the North American Free Trade Agreement (NAFTA) would pull manufacturing jobs out of the United States.

Clinton emerged out as the winner of the second debate leading over both Bush and Perot. A poll conducted by CNN/USA TODAY from Oct. 16–18, showed 58 percent calling Clinton the winner, 16 percent said Bush won and 15 percent said Perot. The format decided was:

- Town hall meeting
- two minute closing statements.

Bush was seen on national camera checking his watch while being asked about the effect of the national debt on him personally. In a 1999 Interview by Jim Lehrer, on being asked what he was thinking as he checked his wristwatch, he replied:

I took a huge hit. That's another thing I don't like debates, you look at your watch and they say that he hasn’t any business running for president. He's bored and he's out of this thing, he's not with it and we need change. They took a little incident like that to show that I was, you know, out of it. They made a huge thing out of that. Now, was I glad when the damn thing was over? Yeah, and maybe that's why I was looking at it, only 10 more minutes of this crap, I mean. [Jim laughs] Go ahead and use it. I'm a free spirit now.

=== Viewership ===
An estimated 69.9 million viewers tuned into the debate.

== October 19: Third presidential debate (Michigan State University) ==
Third presidential debate
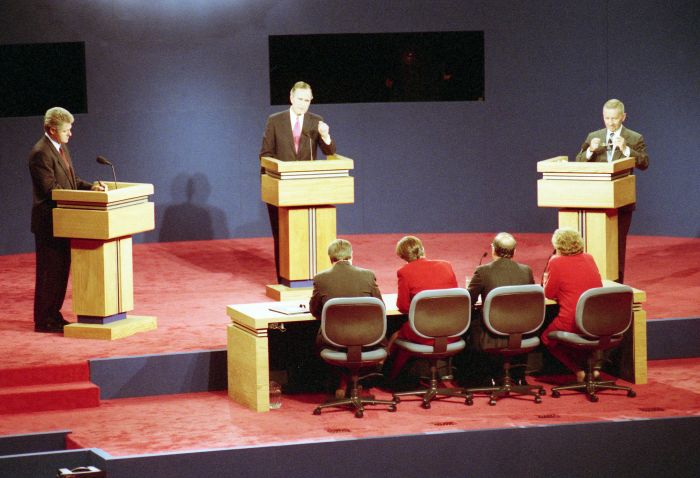
- Date(s): October 19, 1992
- Duration: 90 minutes
- Venue: Michigan State University
- Location: East Lansing, Michigan
- Participants: George H. W. Bush; Bill Clinton; Ross Perot
- Moderator(s): Jim Lehrer of PBS
- Transcript: Full debate

The third and final presidential debate between President George H. W. Bush, Governor Bill Clinton, and Businessman Ross Perot took place on Monday, October 19, 1992, at Michigan State University, East Lansing, Michigan.

The debate was moderated by Jim Lehrer of PBS with Gene Gibbons, Helen Thomas and Susan Rook as panelists. The format decided was:

First half:

- single moderator with option of follow-ups
- roughly two minutes to answer
- one minute rebuttal.

Second half:

- panelists posed questions in turn with no follow-ups
- two minute closing statements.

A poll conducted by CNN/USA TODAY after the third debate found that viewers thought Perot had won. Opinions, however, were tied between Clinton's and Bush's performances; 28 percent thought Clinton had done the best job, 28 percent Bush, and 37 percent said Perot.

=== Viewership ===
An estimated 66.9 million viewers tuned into the debate.

== See also ==
- George H. W. Bush 1992 presidential campaign
- Gore–Perot debate
- Bill Clinton 1992 presidential campaign
- Ross Perot 1992 presidential campaign
- 1992 United States presidential election
