= Gore–Perot debate =

1993 political debate in the United States

The Gore–Perot debate was a televised debate held on November 9, 1993 on CNN's Larry King Live between then-Vice President Al Gore and magnate Ross Perot, an unsuccessful independent candidate in the 1992 United States presidential election, on the topic of the North American Free Trade Agreement. After the debate, viewers and analysts considered Gore to have defeated Perot decisively, helping swing key congressional votes to secure NAFTA's subsequent passage in the House of Representatives eight days later.

== Background ==
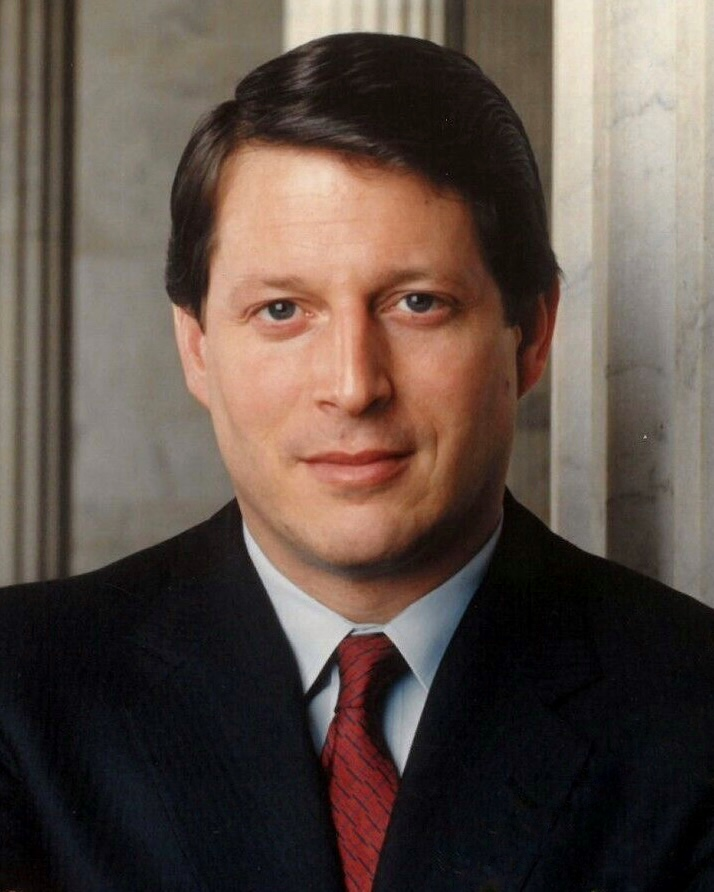
U.S. Vice President Al Gore argued in favor of the North American Free Trade Agreement during the Gore–Perot debate.

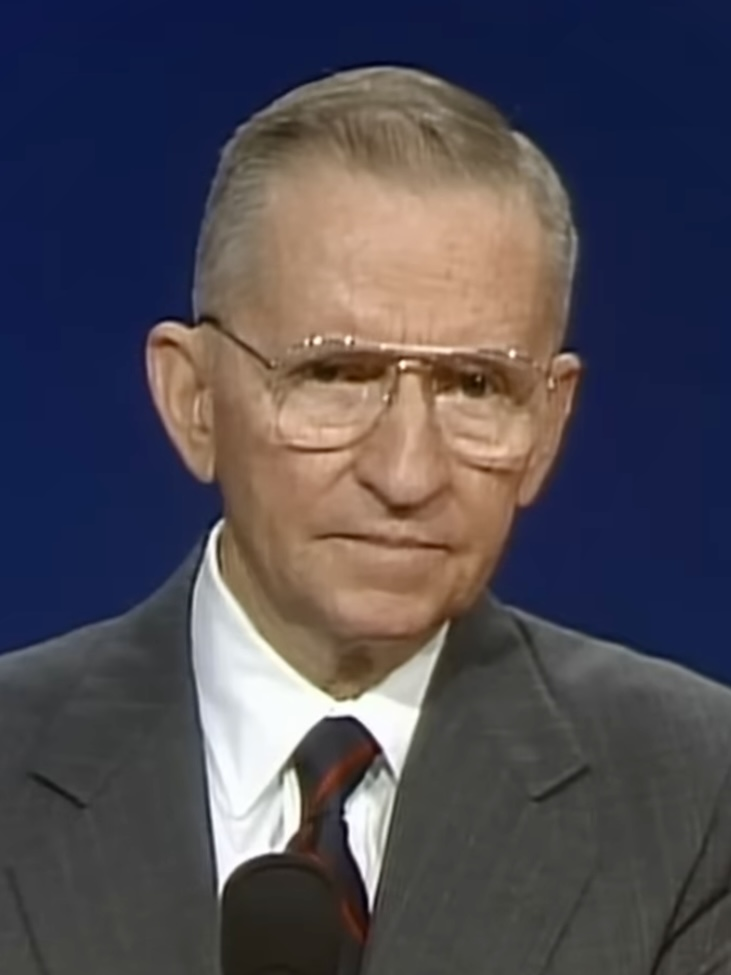
Ross Perot argued against the North American Free Trade Agreement during the Gore–Perot debate.

During the 1992 presidential campaign, incumbent Republican President George H. W. Bush was in the process of negotiating the North American Free Trade Agreement (NAFTA) between the United States, Canada, and Mexico. His opponent, Democratic governor Bill Clinton, despite stating he would not sign the deal as it stood, endorsed NAFTA as a whole, emphasizing that the United States "can address these concerns without renegotiating the basic agreement". This left independent candidate Ross Perot as the only major candidate to wholly oppose the agreement. During the 1992 presidential debates, Perot emphasized his opposition to the agreement, famously stating that, should it pass, there would be a "giant sucking sound going south" as American corporations employed more workers in Mexico instead of the United States.

On November 3, Clinton won the election, defeating Bush and Perot with 370 electoral votes and 43 percent of the popular vote. Also elected on the ticket was running mate Al Gore, the junior U.S. Senator from Tennessee. After Clinton's inauguration, he made good on his campaign promise by seeking congressional approval of NAFTA.

The anti-NAFTA coalition was represented by a wide array of politicians and personalities. While Ross Perot was concerned that the agreement would lead to manufacturing jobs moving out of the United States, fellow former presidential candidate Pat Buchanan was more concerned about protecting American sovereignty and illegal immigration. Buchanan's reasoning was rejected by progressive opponents of NAFTA, such as labor unions and the African-American community. Testifying before Congress, D.C. shadow senator and progressive NAFTA opponent Jesse Jackson claimed that blaming Mexicans for "taking our jobs" was "racist", rejecting Pat Buchanan's view that Mexicans were stealing American jobs in favor of criticizing American corporations for exploiting Mexicans and undercutting American workers.

== Debate ==
By November 1993, NAFTA was facing significant headwinds in Congress, and its passage was a key priority of the Clinton administration. Seizing on polls that showed Ross Perot's falling approval rating, the White House challenged Perot to a televised debate on the merits of NAFTA against Al Gore, now the sitting vice president. Perot accepted, and the debate was scheduled for November 9 on CNN's Larry King Live.

As the debate opened, Gore took a highly aggressive position, repeatedly interrupting Perot to make his point, much to Perot's chagrin. Gore highlighted that the deal was endorsed by every living U.S. president, vice president, secretaries of state, treasury, and defense, as well as every single Nobel Prize-winning economist. Perot replied that they were the ones who were responsible for America's economic problems in the first place.

In one instance, Gore suggested that Perot's opposition to the deal would profit his son, Ross Perot Jr., who ran the family's airport project in Fort Worth, Texas. Perot vigorously denied this accusation, defending his son and calling that accusation "the lowest, silliest propaganda trick put out by the U.S. Government". Another one of Gore's jabs parried by Perot was Gore's assertion that Perot lobbied Congress to give his businesses tax breaks in the 1970s, which he could not provide details for.

In another instance, Gore brought up the 1930 Smoot-Hawley tariff and its disastrous effects on the United States economy, attempting to gift an angry Perot a framed photograph of Smoot and Hawley while suggesting that protectionism would cause another economic depression.

At one point during the debate, Gore brought up Perot's erroneous predictions that 40,000 American soldiers would die if the United States entered the Gulf War, and that over one hundred banks would close if Democrats won the presidency, telling Perot that "the politics of negativism and fear only go so far."

Several times during the debate, Perot lost his temper, asking Gore questions like "Would you even know the truth if you saw it?" and "Are you going to listen? Work on it."

== Aftermath ==
After the conclusion of the debate, a poll of viewers found that 59 percent considered Gore the winner, while 32 percent thought Perot came out on top. Despite its unruly nature, the debate was credited with helping boost support for NAFTA, with support for the deal leaping from 34 percent to 57 percent after the debate.

Nine days after the debate was held, the United States House of Representatives approved NAFTA by a vote of 234 to 200, and NAFTA would go into effect shortly thereafter.

== See also ==
- Free trade debate
- North American integration
- US public opinion on the North American Free Trade Agreement
