= Hal Bruno =

American journalist (1928–2011)

- Born: Harold Robinson Bruno Jr. October 25, 1928; Chicago, Illinois
- Died: November 8, 2011 (aged 83); Bethesda, Maryland
- Education: University of Illinois (Bachelor's degree)
- Occupations: Journalist; Political Analyst; Firefighter
- Years active: 1950-2008
- Employers: Newsweek (1960-1978); ABC News (1978-1999)
- Spouse: Margaret "Meg" Christian Bruno (m. 1959)
- Children: Harold; Daniel

Harold Robinson "Hal" Bruno, Jr. (October 25, 1928 – November 8, 2011) was an American journalist and political analyst, who worked as the political director of ABC News from 1980 to 1999. He served as the moderator of the 1992 vice presidential debate between Dan Quayle, Al Gore, and James Stockdale.

== Biography ==
=== Early life ===
Hal Bruno was born in Chicago, Illinois, on October 25, 1928. His father sold housewares for a living. He became a volunteer firefighter during the 1940s. Bruno earned his bachelor's degree in 1950 from the University of Illinois, where he worked as a sportswriter for the university's newspaper, The Daily Illini, alongside Shel Silverstein, Bud Karmin, Gene Shalit, Hugh Hough and Robert Novak. He also worked for the Champaign News Gazette during weekends while in college.

He served in the Korean War as an Army intelligence officer. Bruno then earned a Fulbright scholarship to study in India after the war. He married his wife, Margaret "Meg" Christian Bruno, on November 12, 1959.

=== Career ===
Bruno launched his professional career as a reporter for Chicago area newspapers and news agencies. His first job after his graduation was for Advertising Age before becoming the sports editor of the Daily Chronicle. He temporarily left his profession in order to serve in the Korean War. Bruno returned to Chicago after the war and joined the staff of the Chicago City News Bureau as a police reporter. He joined The Chicago American in 1954 In 1956, Bruno earned a Fulbright Scholarship in India to study Indian media. He worked as a South Asian correspondent for the International News Service while in India. Bruno covered some of the biggest news stories of the 1950s, including the 1956 Suez Crisis, the Our Lady of the Angels School fire in 1958, and the Cuban revolution in 1959.

He joined the staff of Newsweek magazine in 1960. Bruno worked as a reporter, foreign correspondent, news editor and chief political correspondent for Newsweek for 18 years. One of his first assignments at the magazine was the 1960 presidential election between John F. Kennedy and Richard Nixon. His foreign reports included the 1962 Sino-Indian War. He rose to become Newsweek's Chicago bureau chief and later the magazine's political editor in Washington D.C.

=== ABC News ===
Bruno joined ABC News in 1978 after leaving Newsweek. He oversaw ABC News' election and political coverage during the 1980s and 1990s. Ken Rudin, the current political editor of NPR who worked as Bruno's deputy at ABC News, described Bruno as "...the eyes and ears for Peter (Jennings) and 'World News Tonight' and (Ted) Koppel." As political director, Bruno packaged much of the political headlines presented by ABC's best known reporters, including Ted Koppel, Cokie Roberts, Sam Donaldson, and Peter Jennings. Colleagues, such as Donaldson, have described Bruno as personally knowing nearly every major party county chairman in the United States.

While much of his work at ABC took place off-screen, Bruno was invited onto news and talk shows owing to his political expertise. Bruno also hosted the weekly radio show, Hal Bruno's Washington, on ABC Radio until 1999.

Bruno received public attention as the moderator of the 1992 vice presidential debate in Atlanta on October 13, 1992. The debate took place between incumbent Republican Vice President Dan Quayle, Democrat Al Gore, and Independent retired Vice Admiral James B. Stockdale, who was the running mate of Ross Perot. The debate would become known for unusual responses and negative rhetoric from the candidates and the audience. It would later be called "the most combative debate in the 32-year history of the televised forums" by the Washington Post. One of the most memorable moments from the debate came early in the night. Bruno, in his capacity as debate moderator, asked James Stockdale, "Admiral Stockdale, your opening statement, please, sir?" Stockdale famously replied to Bruno's request: "Who am I? Why am I here?"

Bruno also scolded the debate's audience when they jeered candidates Quayle and Gore, saying, "There’s no call for that ... so knock that off."

He retired from ABC in 1999 to become the chairman of the National Fallen Firefighters Foundation.

=== Firefighting ===
Bruno said that his interest in firefighting began "after riding as a kid on fire trucks in Chicago." Bruno originally became a volunteer firefighter during the 1940s and remained in firefighting for more than 60 years. He served as the chairman of the National Fallen Firefighters Foundation from 1999 to 2008 and remained Chairman Emeritus after retiring from the post. He combined his background in journalism and firefighting as a monthly columnist for Firehouse Magazine. In 2008, he authored a column for Firehouse about the https://www.firehouse.com/prevention-investigation/fire-protection-systems/news/10493645/eyewitness-to-tragedy-our-lady-of-angels-school-fire that he responded to with the Chicago Fire Department and later put on his reporter's hat to cover.

Bruno called in coverage of the attack on the Pentagon on September 11, 2001. He was one of the first rescue workers to respond to the Pentagon attack and remained on site for hours.

=== Later life ===
Bruno was inducted into the Society of Professional Journalists Hall of Fame in 2008.

Bruno died at Suburban Hospital in Bethesda, Maryland, November 8, 2011, of heart arrhythmia caused by a fall at the age of 83. He was survived by his wife of nearly 56 years, Margaret; two sons, Harold R. Bruno III and Daniel Bruno; his sister, Barbara; and four grandchildren. Bruno and his wife were residents of Chevy Chase, Maryland.
