= Stanley Penn =

American journalist (born 1928)

Stanley William Penn (born January 12, 1928) is an American former journalist who spent much of his career at the Wall Street Journal. In 1967, he won a Pulitzer Prize for National Affairs Reporting.

== Early life and education ==
Penn was born in New York City on January 12, 1928, as the son of Murray Penn and Lillian (Richman) Penn. He attended Brooklyn College and received a B.A. from the University of Missouri. Penn studied journalism at the latter institution, but later said, "Journalism school was largely a waste of time...If I started out again, I'd major in English, history, or philosophy."

== Career ==
Penn joined the Wall Street Journal in 1952, serving in its Chicago and Detroit bureaus between 1952 and 1957. He became an investigative reporter in that newspaper's New York bureau in 1957, and stayed there until 1990.

He was praised in New York magazine as one of the few true investigative reporters in the U.S.

Penn wrote exclusive articles about the financial dealings of Robert Vesco and Howard Hughes. He established that Vesco had clandestine financial ties to President José Figueres Ferrer of Costa Rica, and that Robert Wagner, the former mayor of New York City, had clandestine financial ties to "a questionable offshore real estate fund."

In 1964, he reported on ballot security.

A statement by Penn in a 1966 article has been widely quoted in recent years as an example of faulty prognostication. "Despite the trend to compactness and lower costs," wrote Penn, "it is unlikely everyone will have his own computer any time soon."

In 1969 and 1970, he reported on the Newark, New Jersey Mafia.

Penn reported in 1971 on a lawsuit filed by Allen & Co., a New York investment bank, charging that Occidental Petroleum had cheated the bank "out of a share of oil concessions in Libya." He quoted from a sworn deposition in which a former Libyan oil minister stated that "he had been close friends with a European promoter hired by Occidental and had kept in touch with him during the bidding on these concessions, with the result that two of the best concessions, worth hundreds of millions dollars, had gone to Occidental." Penn also "found out that the brother-in-law of the former oil minister had received financial interests in a Liechtenstein construction firm controlled by a former representative of Occidental," who, at the minister's request, "had financed a $100,000 movie extolling Libya, for which the former oil minister wrote the script," with his brother-in-law receiving "90 percent of any profits the film might make." Penn's research "showed that if the oil minister received no benefits from the award of the concessions to Occidental, his brother-in-law might have."

When President Nixon nominated William Casey to head the Securities and Exchange Commission, Penn heard that "Casey might have been involved in questionable activities," and after some investigation discovered that "Casey was a rich man who had had interests in a lot of small electronic firms that sold stocks to the public" and that he had been the defendant in several lawsuits. In one suit, "Casey had been accused by a stockholder of violating the same securities laws he would have to uphold as head of the S.E.C. The plaintiff claimed that he had been duped by misleading information into investing $10,000 in Casey's firm, which had collapsed. Casey, the only defendant, had settled out of court for $8,000." When Penn spoke to Casey, Casey described the lawsuit as a "nuisance suit" and maintained that "he hadn't been close to that company." In fact, "Casey's law firm was general counsel to the company, and that he was a stockholder and a director as well as the chairman of the board." Despite Penn's reporting, Casey was confirmed by the Senate to be head of the SEC.

On May 21, 1981, he and Julie Salamon wrote a piece about recent cases of embezzlement in which Chase Manhattan and Wells Fargo had lost millions of dollars.

== Book ==
He wrote a book entitled Have I Got a Tip for You... And Other Tales of Dirty Secrets, Political Payoffs and Corporate Scams: A Guide to Investigative Reporting. It was published by Dow Jones in 1994.

== Honors and awards ==
In 1967, Penn and Monroe W. Karmin shared the Pulitzer Prize for National Affairs Reporting for exposing links between organized crime in the U.S. and gambling in the Bahamas. Their investigation established that American gangsters had infiltrated the gambling business on the islands and contributed to the fall of the Bahamian government in a later election.
