= James Stockdale =

US Navy admiral and aviator (1923–2005)

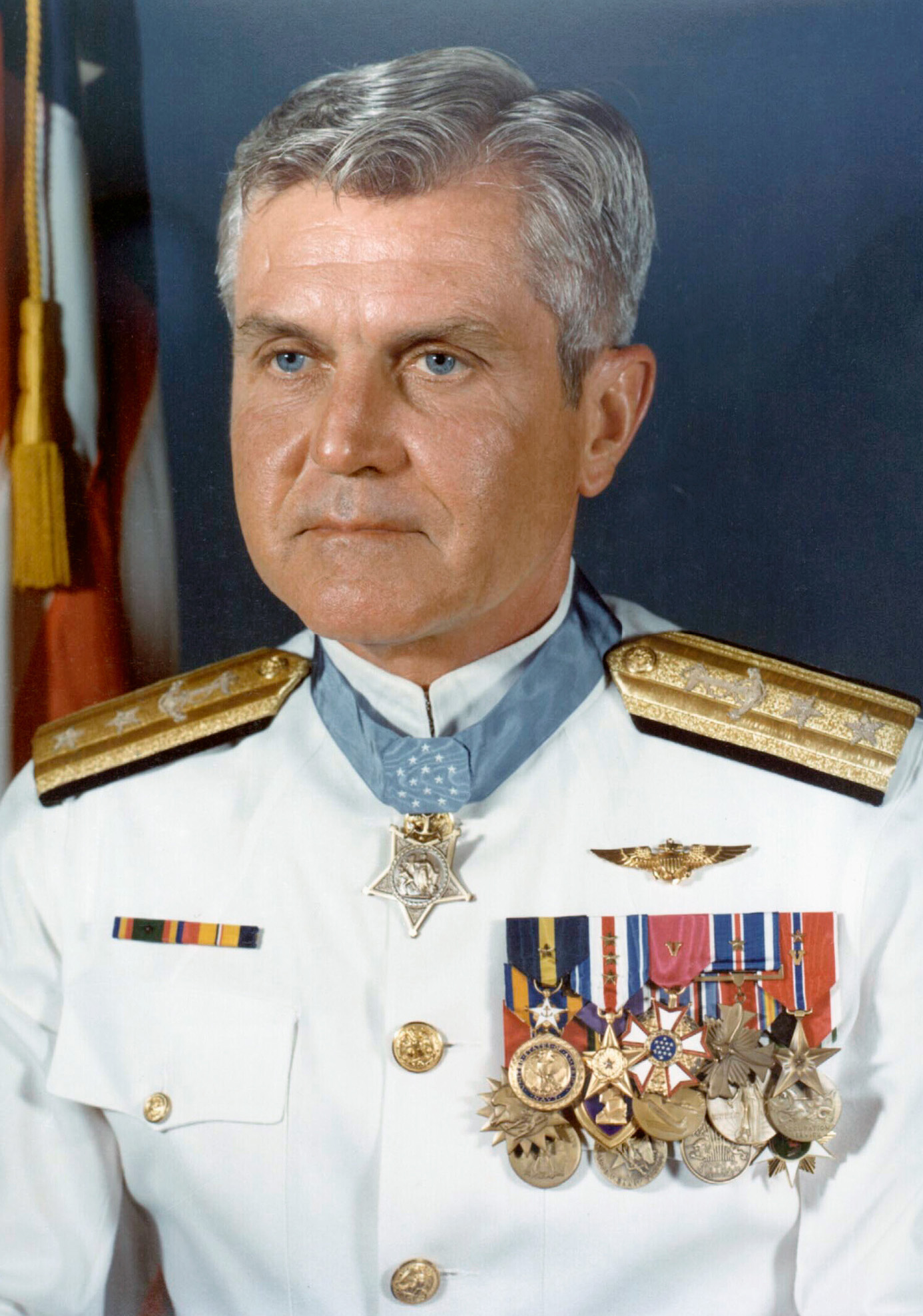
- Official portrait, c. 1979
- Born: James Bond Stockdale; December 23, 1923; Abingdon, Illinois, U.S.
- Died: July 5, 2005 (aged 81); Coronado, California, U.S.
- Burial place: United States Naval Academy Cemetery, Annapolis, Maryland, U.S.
- Alma mater: United States Naval Academy (BS); Stanford University (MA)
- Spouse: Sybil Bailey Stockdale (m. 1947)
- Military career
- Allegiance: United States of America
- Branch: United States Navy
- Service years: 1946–1979
- Rank: Vice admiral
- Commands: VF-51; Carrier Air Wing 16
- Conflicts: Vietnam War; Gulf of Tonkin incident
- Awards: Medal of Honor; Navy Distinguished Service Medal (3); Silver Star (4); Legion of Merit (with "V" device); Distinguished Flying Cross (2); Bronze Star Medal (2) (with "V" device); Purple Heart (2); Air Medal (Strike/Flight 10)
- Other work: Vice presidential candidate, 1992

James Bond Stockdale (December 23, 1923 – July 5, 2005) was a U.S. Navy vice admiral and aviator who received the Medal of Honor in 1976 for his leadership as a POW for more than seven years during the Vietnam War.

Stockdale was the most senior naval officer held captive in Hanoi, North Vietnam. He led aerial attacks from the carrier USS Ticonderoga (CVA-14) during the 1964 Gulf of Tonkin incident. On his next deployment, while commander of Carrier Air Wing Sixteen aboard the carrier USS Oriskany (CV-34), his A-4 Skyhawk jet was shot down in North Vietnam on September 9, 1965. He served as president of the Naval War College from October 1977 until he retired from the navy in 1979. As vice admiral, he was the president of The Citadel from 1979 to 1980.

Stockdale was a candidate for vice president of the United States in the 1992 presidential election, on Ross Perot's independent ticket.

== Early life and education ==
Stockdale was born in Abingdon, Illinois, on December 23, 1923, the son of Vernon Beard Stockdale (1888–1964) and Mabel Edith Stockdale (née Bond; 1889–1967). Following a brief period at Monmouth College, he entered the United States Naval Academy in Annapolis, Maryland, in June 1943.

== Naval career ==
On June 5, 1946, he graduated with a Bachelor of Science degree from the U.S. Naval Academy with the Class of 1947 due to the reduced schedule still in effect from World War II. Academically, he ranked 130th among 821 graduates in his class. His first assignment was assistant gunnery officer aboard the destroyer minesweeper USS Carmick (DD-493) from June to October 1946. He next served aboard the USS Thompson (DD-627) from October 1946 to February 1947, the USS Charles H. Roan (DD-853) from February 1947 to July 1948, and the USS Deming (PCS-1392) from July 1948 to June 1949.

Stockdale was accepted for flight training in June 1949 and reported to Naval Air Station Pensacola in Florida. He was designated a Naval Aviator at Naval Air Station Corpus Christi in Texas, in September 1950. He was next assigned for additional training at Naval Air Station Norfolk in Virginia from October 1950 to January 1951. In January 1954, he was accepted into the United States Naval Test Pilot School at the Naval Air Station Patuxent River base in Southern Maryland, and he completed his training in July 1954. There he tutored the U.S. Marine Corps aviator John Glenn in mathematics and physics. He was a test pilot until January 1957.

In 1959, the U.S. Navy sent Stockdale to Stanford University, where he earned a Master of Arts degree in international relations in 1962. Stockdale preferred the life of a fighter pilot over academia, but he later credited Stoic philosophy with helping him cope as a prisoner of war.

=== Vietnam War ===
==== Gulf of Tonkin Incident ====
Stockdale exiting his A-4 Skyhawk attack jet weeks before becoming a POW

On August 2, 1964, while on a DESOTO patrol in the Tonkin Gulf, the destroyer USS Maddox (DD-731) engaged three North Vietnamese Navy P-4 torpedo boats from the 135th Torpedo Squadron. After fighting a running gun and torpedo battle, in which Maddox fired more than 280 5-inch (130 mm) shells, and the torpedo boats expended their 6 torpedoes (all misses) and hundreds of rounds of 14.5mm machine gun fire; the combatants broke contact. As the torpedo boats turned for their North Vietnamese coastline, four F-8 Crusader fighter aircraft from USS Ticonderoga (CV-14) arrived, and immediately attacked the retreating torpedo boats.

Stockdale (commander VF-51 (Fighter Squadron 51)), with Lieutenant (Junior Grade) Richard Hastings attacked torpedo boats T-333 and T-336, while Commander R. F. Mohrhardt and Lieutenant Commander C. E. Southwick attacked torpedo boat T-339. The four F-8 pilots reported scoring no hits with their Zuni rockets, but reported hits on all three torpedo boats with their 20 mm cannon.

Two nights later, on August 4, 1964, Stockdale was overhead during the second reported attack in the Tonkin Gulf. Unlike the first event, which was an actual sea battle, no Vietnamese forces were believed to have been involved in the second engagement. In the early 1990s, he recounted: "[I] had the best seat in the house to watch that event, and our destroyers were just shooting at phantom targets—there were no PT boats there. ... There was nothing there but black water and American fire power."

The next morning, on August 5, 1964, President Johnson ordered bombing raids on North Vietnamese military targets which he announced were retaliation for the alleged incident of August 4. When Stockdale was awakened in the early morning and was told he was to lead these attacks he responded: "Retaliation for what?" Later, while a prisoner of war, he was concerned that he would be forced to reveal this secret about the Vietnam War.

==== Prisoner of war ====
On September 9, 1965, while flying as the Carrier Air Wing Sixteen Commander from USS Oriskany on a mission over North Vietnam, Stockdale ejected from his Douglas A-4 Skyhawk, which had been struck by enemy fire and completely disabled. He parachuted into a small village, where he was severely beaten and taken prisoner.

Stockdale was held as a prisoner of war in the Hỏa Lò Prison (the "Hanoi Hilton") for the next 7 1/2 years. As the senior naval officer, he was one of the primary organizers of prisoner resistance. Tortured routinely and denied medical attention for the severely damaged leg he suffered during capture, Stockdale created and enforced a code of conduct for all prisoners, which governed torture, secret communications, and behavior. In the summer of 1969, he was locked in leg irons in a bath stall and routinely tortured and beaten. When told by his captors that he was to be paraded in public, Stockdale slit his scalp with a razor to purposely disfigure himself so that his captors could not use him as propaganda. When they covered his head with a hat, he beat himself with a stool until his face was swollen beyond recognition. When Stockdale was discovered with information that could implicate his friends' so-called "black activities", he slit his wrists so they could not torture him into confession. During the course of his captivity, due to torture, his leg was broken twice.

Early in Stockdale's captivity, his wife, Sybil Stockdale, organized The League of American Families of POWs and MIAs, with other wives of servicemen who were in similar circumstances. By 1968, she and her organization, which called for the president and the U.S. Congress to publicly acknowledge the mistreatment of the POWs (something that had never been done despite evidence of gross mistreatment), gained the attention of the American press. Sybil Stockdale personally made these demands known at the Paris Peace Talks.

Stockdale was one of eleven U.S. military prisoners known as the "Alcatraz Gang". Owing to their reputation as resistance leaders, they were separated from other captives and placed in solitary confinement in "Alcatraz", a special facility in a courtyard behind the North Vietnamese Ministry of National Defense, located about one mile away from Hỏa Lò Prison. They were imprisoned in windowless, concrete cells measuring 3 by 9 feet (0.9 by 2.7 m) with a light bulb kept on around the clock, and locked in leg irons each night.

==== The Stockdale Paradox ====
James C. Collins related a conversation he had with James Stockdale regarding his coping strategy during his period in the Vietnamese POW camp. When Collins asked which prisoners didn't make it out of Vietnam, Stockdale replied:

Oh, that's easy, the optimists. Oh, they were the ones who said, "We're going to be out by Christmas". And Christmas would come, and Christmas would go. Then they'd say, "We're going to be out by Easter". And Easter would come, and Easter would go. And then Thanksgiving, and then it would be Christmas again. And they died of a broken heart. This is a very important lesson. You must never confuse faith that you will prevail in the end—which you can never afford to lose—with the discipline to confront the most brutal facts of your current reality, whatever they might be.

Collins called this the Stockdale Paradox.

=== Return to the United States ===
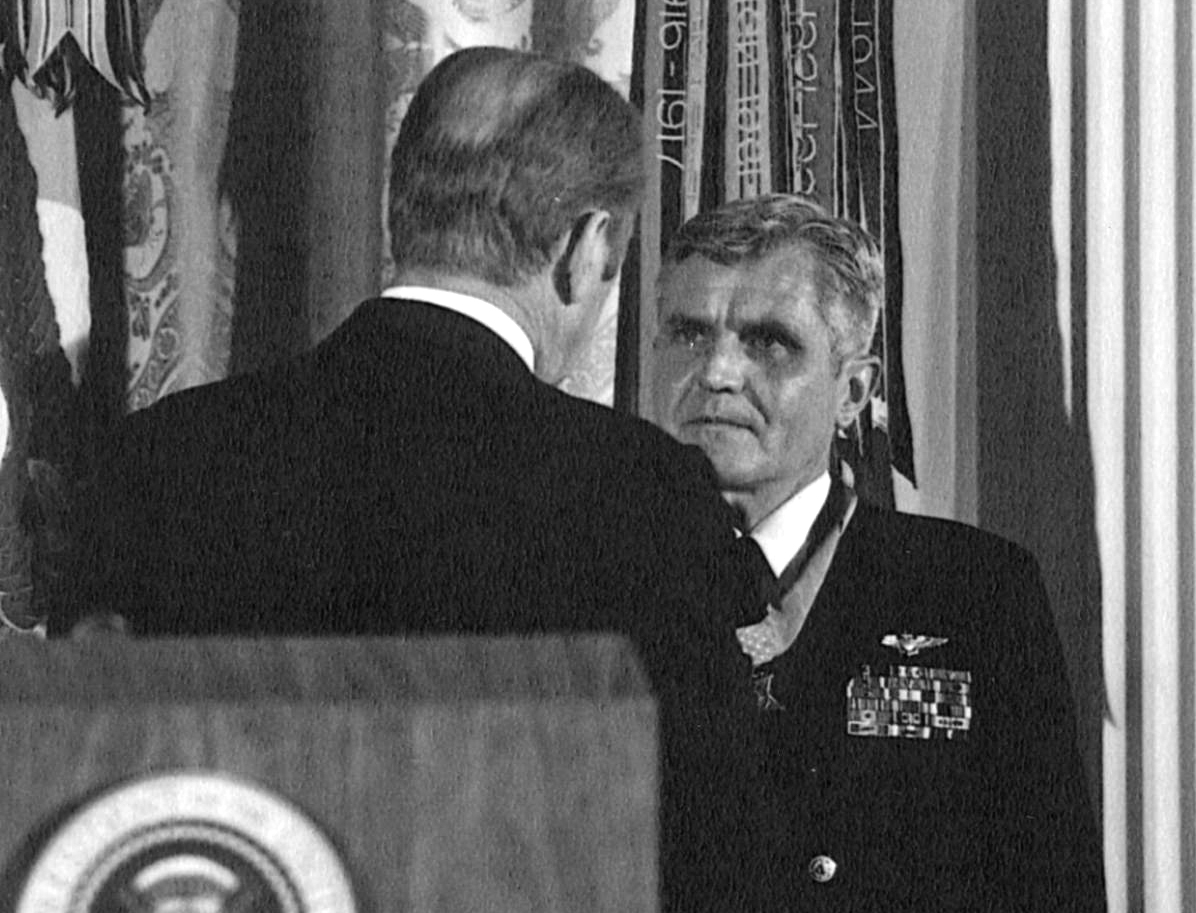
United States President Gerald Ford presents the Medal of Honor to Stockdale at the White House on March 4, 1976.

Stockdale was released as a prisoner of war on February 12, 1973, during Operation Homecoming.

On March 4, 1976, Stockdale received the Medal of Honor. Stockdale filed charges against two other officers (Marine Corps Lieutenant Colonel Edison W. Miller and Navy Captain Walter E. "Gene" Wilber) who, he felt, had given aid and comfort to the enemy. However, the Department of the Navy under the leadership of then-Secretary of the Navy John Warner took no action and retired these men "in the best interests of the Navy." Both Miller and Wilber received letters of censure.

Debilitated by his captivity and mistreatment, Stockdale could not stand upright and could barely walk upon his return to the United States, which prevented his return to active flying status. In deference to his previous service, the U.S. Navy kept him on active duty, steadily promoting him over the next few years before he retired as a vice admiral on September 1, 1979. He completed his career by serving as the president of the Naval War College at Newport, Rhode Island, from October 13, 1977, until August 22, 1979.

=== Civilian academic work and writings ===
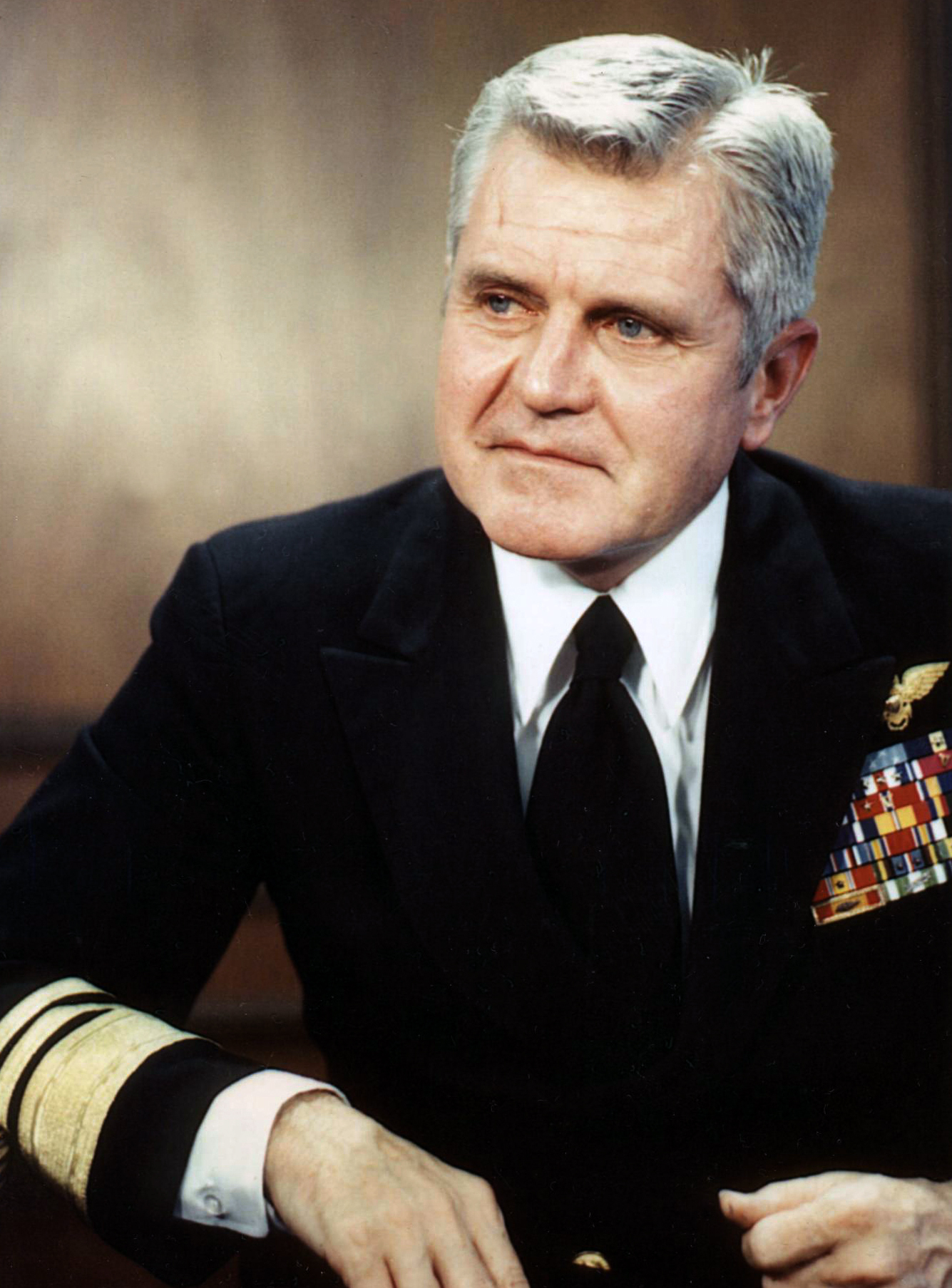
Stockdale as president of the Naval War College in 1979

After his retirement in 1979, he became the president of The Citadel. His tenure there was short-lived as he found himself at odds with the college's board as well as most of its administration, by proposing radical changes to the college's military system and other facets of the college. He left The Citadel to become a fellow of the Hoover Institution at Stanford University in 1981. During his twelve-year tenure at the Hoover Institution, Stockdale wrote and lectured extensively. His primary focus was ancient Stoicism and the Roman slave-turned-philosopher Epictetus, whose lessons captured in The Enchiridion Stockdale credited with providing him strength during his ordeals as a prisoner in the Hanoi Hilton. Between 1981 and 1988 Stockdale also served as chair of the White House Fellows under the Reagan administration.

In 1984, Stockdale and his wife Sybil co-authored In Love and War: the Story of a Family's Ordeal and Sacrifice During the Vietnam War, which was published by Harper and Row. It recounts Stockdale's experiences while in Vietnam; additionally, in alternating chapters, it also tells the story of Sybil Stockdale's early involvement in the League of American Families of POWs and MIAs, which she helped to found, and served as its first chairperson. Their story was later made into an NBC television movie under the name In Love and War, starring James Woods and Jane Alexander.

Stockdale was a member of the board of directors of the Rockford Institute, and he was a frequent contributor to Chronicles: A magazine of American Culture.

== Vice presidential candidacy ==
Stockdale became acquainted with businessman and presidential candidate Ross Perot through his wife's work in establishing an organization to represent the families of Vietnam POWs. On March 30, 1992, Perot announced that he had asked Stockdale to be the provisional vice presidential candidate on his 1992 independent ticket. Perot intended to replace Stockdale with another candidate, but did not do so before dropping out of the race in July 1992.

Perot re-entered the race in the fall of 1992, with Stockdale still in place as vice presidential candidate. Stockdale was not informed that he would be participating in the October 13 vice presidential debate held in Atlanta, Georgia, until a week before the event. He had no formal preparation for the debate, unlike his opponents Al Gore and Dan Quayle, and did not discuss any political issues with Perot beforehand.

Stockdale opened the debate by saying, "Who am I? Why am I here?", as a response to the request for an opening statement from debate moderator, Hal Bruno, the political director of ABC News. At first the rhetorical questions drew applause from the audience. However, his unfocused manner through the rest of the debate (including asking the moderator to repeat one question because he did not have his hearing aid turned on) made him appear confused and disoriented. A humorous caricature of the debate on Saturday Night Live later that week, with Phil Hartman as Stockdale, cemented a public perception of Stockdale as slow-witted. He was also often parodied for his repeated use of the term "gridlock" to describe slow governmental policy.

As his introduction to the large segment of American voters who had not previously heard of him, the debate was disastrous for Stockdale. He was portrayed in the media as elderly and confused, and his reputation never recovered. In a 1999 interview with Jim Lehrer, Stockdale explained that the statements were intended to introduce himself and his personal history to the television audience:

It was terribly frustrating because I remember I started with, "Who am I? Why am I here?" and I never got back to that because there was never an opportunity for me to explain my life to people. It was so different from Quayle and Gore. The four years in solitary confinement in Vietnam, seven-and-a-half years in prisons, drop the first bomb that started the...American bombing raid in the North Vietnam. We blew the oil storage tanks of them off the map. And I never—I couldn't approach—I don't say it just to brag, but, I mean, my sensitivities are completely different.

In a 1994 HBO comedy special, Dennis Miller gave an impassioned defense of Stockdale's debate performance:

Now I know (Stockdale's name has) become a buzzword in this culture for doddering old man, but let's look at the record, folks. The guy was the first guy in and the last guy out of Vietnam, a war that many Americans, including your new President, chose not to dirty their hands with. He had to turn his hearing aid on at that debate because those animals knocked his eardrums out when he wouldn't spill his guts. He teaches philosophy at Stanford University, he's a brilliant, sensitive, courageous man. And yet he committed the one unpardonable sin in our culture: he was bad on television.

Perot and Stockdale received 19 percent of the vote in the 1992 presidential election, one of the best showings by an independent ticket in U.S. electoral history, although they did not carry any states.

== Military awards ==
Stockdale's decorations and awards include:

Naval Aviator insignia
Medal of Honor		Navy Distinguished Service Medal w/ two 5/16" Gold Stars
Silver Star Medal w/ three 5/16" Gold Stars	Legion of Merit w/ Combat "V"	Distinguished Flying Cross w/ one 5/16" Gold Star
Bronze Star Medal w/ Combat "V" and one 5/16" Gold Star	Purple Heart w/ one 5/16" Gold Star	Air Medal w/ Strike/Flight Numeral 10
Combat Action Ribbon	Navy Unit Commendation w/ one 3/16" bronze star	Prisoner of War Medal
American Campaign Medal	World War II Victory Medal	Navy Occupation Service Medal
National Defense Service Medal w/ one 3/16" bronze star	Armed Forces Expeditionary Medal w/ two 3/16" bronze stars	Vietnam Service Medal w/ three 3/16" silver stars and one 3/16" bronze star
Republic of Vietnam Gallantry Cross Unit Citation	Republic of Vietnam Campaign Medal	Navy Pistol Marksmanship Medal w/ "E" device

=== Medal of Honor citation ===
Stockdale's official Medal of Honor citation reads:

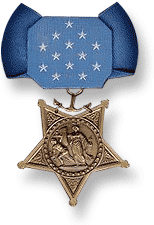

For conspicuous gallantry and intrepidity at the risk of his life above and beyond the call of duty while senior naval officer in the Prisoner of War camps of North Vietnam. Recognized by his captors as the leader in the Prisoners' of War resistance to interrogation and in their refusal to participate in propaganda exploitation, Rear Adm. Stockdale was singled out for interrogation and attendant torture after he was detected in a covert communications attempt. Sensing the start of another purge, and aware that his earlier efforts at self-disfiguration to dissuade his captors from exploiting him for propaganda purposes had resulted in cruel and agonizing punishment, Rear Adm. Stockdale resolved to make himself a symbol of resistance regardless of personal sacrifice. He deliberately inflicted a near-mortal wound to his person in order to convince his captors of his willingness to give up his life rather than capitulate. He was subsequently discovered and revived by the North Vietnamese who, convinced of his indomitable spirit, abated in their employment of excessive harassment and torture toward all of the Prisoners of War. By his heroic action, at great peril to himself, he earned the everlasting gratitude of his fellow prisoners and of his country. Rear Adm. Stockdale's valiant leadership and extraordinary courage in a hostile environment sustain and enhance the finest traditions of the U.S. Naval Service.

== Later life and death ==
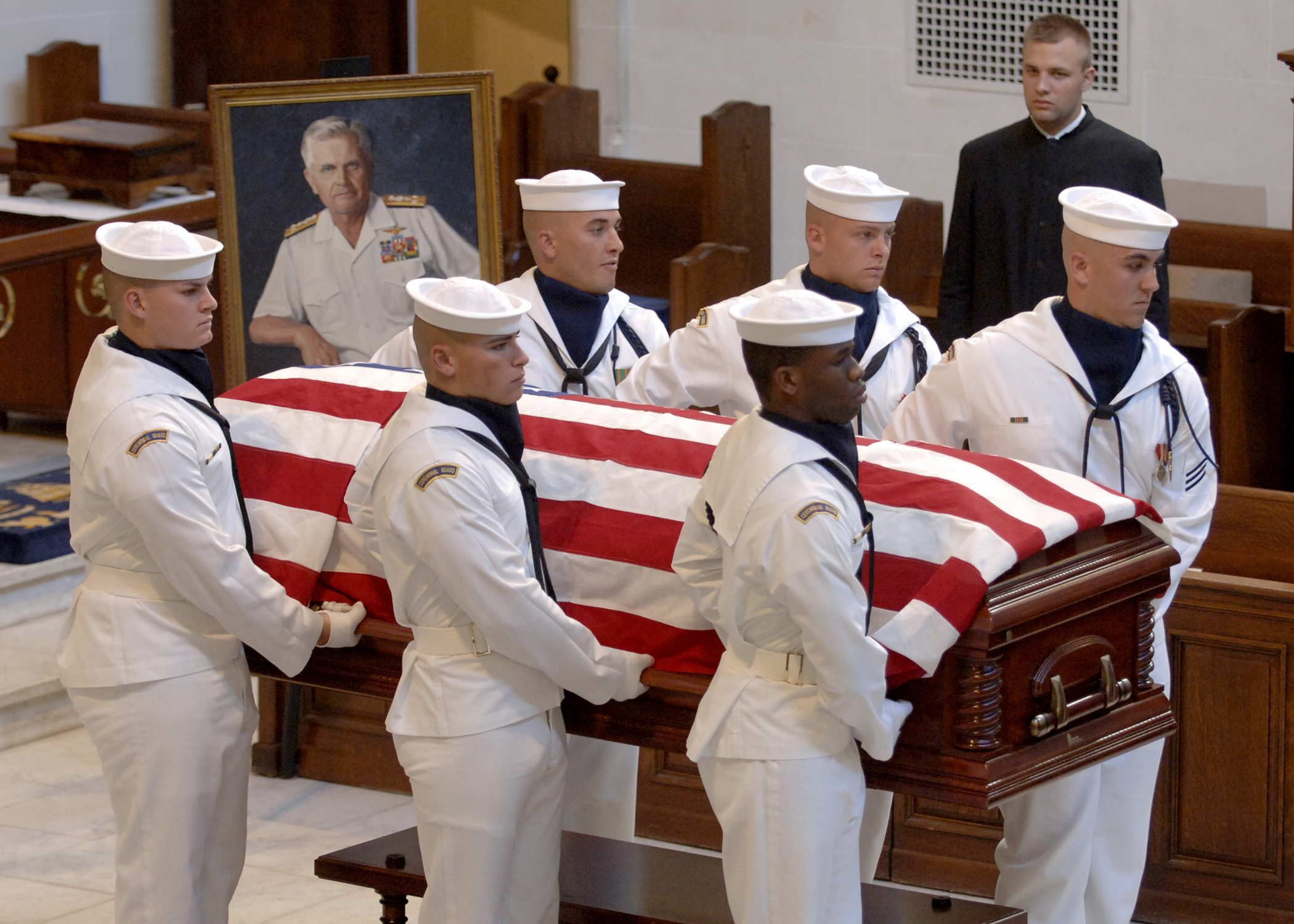
Sailors carry Stockdale's casket during his funeral service at the U.S. Naval Academy Chapel in 2005.

Stockdale did not support Perot's second presidential campaign in the 1996 United States presidential election. Instead, Stockdale supported the campaign of Republican nominee Bob Dole. Stockdale served as a Dole delegate to the 1996 Republican National Convention. In 1996, Stockdale remarked, "I'm a Republican, I've been a Republican all my life. I just did that one run for an old friend [Perot]," noting that he was uninvolved and "disinterested" in Perot's 1996 campaign.

Stockdale retired to Coronado, California, as he slowly succumbed to Alzheimer's disease. He died from the illness on July 5, 2005. He was 81. Stockdale's funeral service was held at the Naval Academy Chapel and he was buried at the United States Naval Academy Cemetery.

== Legacy ==
The Vice Admiral James Bond Stockdale Award for Inspirational Leadership is a United States Navy award established in 1980 by United States Secretary of the Navy Edward Hidalgo to honor the inspirational leadership of Stockdale. The award was first made in 1981.

The U.S. Navy has named a number of structures after Stockdale, including the Arleigh Burke-class guided missile destroyer USS Stockdale (DDG-106), christened on May 10, 2008. At the Naval Air Station North Island in Coronado, California, the main gate (inaugurated on August 30, 2007) and the headquarters building for the Pacific Fleet's Survival, Evasion, Resistance and Escape (SERE) school were both named in his honor. In July 2008, a statue of him was erected in front of Luce Hall at the U.S. Naval Academy; the hall which houses the Vice Admiral James B. Stockdale Center for Ethical Leadership.

In 1976, he received the Golden Plate Award of the American Academy of Achievement.

Stockdale Center, the student center at Monmouth College in Monmouth, Illinois, which he attended prior to transferring to the Naval Academy, was dedicated in his honor in 1989.

He was enshrined in the National Aviation Hall of Fame in 2002.

The Admiral James & Sybil Stockdale Arena at South Kent School was named after Stockdale and his wife in April 2014.

In October 2014, Airbase Arizona of the Commemorative Air Force placed on display a restored Grumman AF-2S Guardian (BuNo 126731) flown by vice admiral Stockdale early in his navy career with his name on the canopy rail and all markings as they were when he flew the aircraft in the 1950s.

A luxury suite at the Loews Annapolis Hotel, where Perot announced his candidacy, was named in Stockdale's honor.

The Abingdon-Avon High School Auditorium in Abingdon, Illinois, has been named "Stockdale Auditorium" in his honor.

== Electoral history ==
1992 United States Presidential Election
Party	Candidate	Votes	%
Democratic	Bill Clinton/Al Gore	44,909,806	43.0%
Republican	George H. W. Bush (incumbent)/ Dan Quayle (incumbent)	39,104,550	37.4%
Independent	Ross Perot/James Stockdale	19,743,821	18.9%

== Bibliography ==
=== Books ===
- Taiwan and the Sino-Soviet Dispute, Stanford University Press, California, 1962.
- The Ethics of Citizenship, University of Texas at Dallas, 1981, Andrew R. Cecil lectures on moral values in a free society featured Stockdale and other speakers.
- James Bond Stockdale Speaks on the "Melting Experience: Grow or Die", Hoover Institution, Stanford, 1981 speech to the graduating class of John Carroll University in Cleveland, Ohio.
- A Vietnam Experience: Ten Years of Reflection, Hoover Institution, Stanford, 1984, ISBN 0-8179-8151-9.
- In Love and War: The Story of a Family's Ordeal and Sacrifice During the Vietnam Years
  - 1984 Original, Harper & Row, New York, ISBN 0-06-015318-0.
  - 1990 Reprint, Naval Institute Press, Annapolis, Maryland, ISBN 0-87021-308-3.
- Courage Under Fire: Testing Epictetus's Doctrines in a Laboratory of Human Behavior, Hoover Institution, Stanford, 1993, ISBN 0-8179-3692-0.
- Thoughts of a Philosophical Fighter Pilot, Hoover Institution, Stanford, 1995 ISBN 0-8179-9391-6.

=== Other writings ===
- Stockdale on Stoicism I: The Stoic Warrior's Triad
- Stockdale on Stoicism II: Master of My Fate

== See also ==
- List of Medal of Honor recipients for the Vietnam War
- List of United States presidential candidates (1856–present)
- List of Mount Holyoke College people
- List of United States Naval Academy alumni (Medal of Honor)
- List of prisoners of war

Military offices
Preceded by Huntington Hardisty	President of the Naval War College; 1977–1979	Succeeded by Edward F. Welch Jr.
