= William H. Goetzmann =

American historian of philosophy (1930–2010)

William Harry Goetzmann (July 20, 1930 – September 7, 2010) was an American historian and emeritus professor in the American Studies and American Civilization Programs at the University of Texas at Austin. He attended Yale University as a graduate student and was friends with Tom Wolfe while there. His work on the American West won him the highest prizes for historians, the Parkman Prize and the Pulitzer Prize. He wrote and published extensively on American philosophy, American political history, and the American arts. An advocate for the importance of history as a public discussion, he served in various capacities in television and film production, notably for PBS. At the time of his death he was the Jack S. Blanton Sr. Chair Emeritus in History and American Studies. His last book was Beyond the Revolution: A History of American Thought From Paine to Pragmatism (2009).

== Biography ==
Goetzmann was born in Washington and raised in the American Midwest, notably in St. Paul, Minnesota, where his family once rented an apartment previously occupied by the bank robber John Dillinger. The Dillinger-apartment experience was one of many that drew him to the study of history as a dramatic narrative populated by colorful individuals and sweeping movements. Educated at Yale University where he received BA and Ph.D. degrees, he taught at Yale from 1955 to 1964, with his interest in the history of the West sparked by the historian Howard R. Lamar. He then moved to The University of Texas at Austin to develop its fledgling American Studies and American Civilization Programs. His early writing concerned American diplomacy and American expansionism; in 1966, Alfred A. Knopf published his Exploration and Empire: The Explorer and the Scientist in the Winning of the American West, which rapidly won the two most prestigious prizes in American historical writing, the Parkman Prize and the Pulitzer Prize. Over the next five decades, he published widely, establishing himself as one of the nation's premiere historians, and ranging widely among intellectual history, cultural history, art history, history of science, and history of philosophy.
A devoted and influential teacher, he was mentor to MacArthur "Genius Award" winner Stephen J. Pyne, design historian Jeffrey L. Meikle, historian of photography and cultural historian Peter Bacon Hales, novelist and cultural historian Kay Sloan, and many others.

Goetzmann died of congestive heart failure in Austin, Texas. He was survived by his wife, Mewes Goetzmann, sons William N. Goetzmann of New Haven, and Stephen R. Goetzmann of Dallas; a daughter, Anne Goetzmann Kelley of Austin; and five grandchildren.

== Awards and honors ==
- 1967 Francis Parkman Prize and 1967 Pulitzer Prize for History, both for Exploration and Empire
- 1968 Golden Plate Award of the American Academy of Achievement
- 1999 Member of the American Philosophical Society
- 2000 Member of the American Academy of Arts and Sciences

== Partial bibliography ==
- Army Exploration in the American West, 1803–1863. Yale University Press, 1959.
- When the Eagle Screamed: The Romantic Horizon in American Expansionism, 1800–1860. John Wiley, 1966.
- Exploration and Empire: The Explorer and the Scientist in the Winning of the American West. Alfred A. Knopf, 1966.
- American Hegelians: An Intellectual Episode in the History of Western America, ed. Alfred A. Knopf, 1973.
- The West as Romantic Horizon. Joslyn Art Museum and University of Nebraska Press, 1981.
- New Lands, New Men: America and the Second Great Age of Discovery. Viking Press, 1986.
- The West of the Imagination (with William N. Goetzmann). Norton Press, 1986.
- George Ballentine’s Autobiography of an English Soldier in the United States Army (1986), ed.
- The First Americans: Photographs From the Library of Congress. Starwood Publications, 1991.
- Gen. Samuel Chamberlain’s My Confession: Recollections of a Rogue (1996), ed.
- Beyond the Revolution: A History of American Thought From Paine to Pragmatism. Basic Books, 2009.
