= Peter Bacon Hales =

American historian, professor, musician, and photographer

Peter B. Hales
- Born: November 13, 1950; Pasadena, California, U.S.
- Died: August 26, 2014 (aged 63) near Stone Ridge, New York, U.S.
- Spouse: Maureen Pskowski
- Writing career
- Language: English
- Period: 1980–2014
- Notable works: Silver Cities: The Photography of American Urbanization, 1839–1915; Atomic Spaces: Living on the Manhattan Project

Peter Bacon Hales (November 13, 1950 – August 26, 2014) was an American historian, photographer, author and musician specializing in American spaces and landscapes, the history of photography and contemporary art.

== Biography ==
Hales graduated from Haverford College in 1972, earning a BA in English and American Literature. After spending some time in New York working as a photographer and musician, he moved to Texas in the mid-1970s to begin his graduate education under the photographers Russell Lee and Garry Winogrand. Hales completed both his MA (in 1976) and PhD (1980) at the University of Texas, specializing in American Civilization under the tutelage of cultural historians William H. Goetzmann and William Stott. In 1980, he began his academic career as a professor in the Department of Art History at the University of Illinois at Chicago, where he eventually was named director of the American Studies Institute. Hales' 1984 text Silver Cities: The Photography of American Urbanization, 1839–1915, charted the transformation of America through the mass-production and distribution of photographs; its Visual Culture focus on the rapidly urbanizing nation through exploration of U.S. photographers and photographs from antebellum America to World War I represented one of the first comprehensive studies of urban photography from a cultural-history standpoint.

Hales focus eventually turned from specifically urban America to the broader changes in the nation's physical and cultural geography. His analysis concentrated on the westward expansion of the United States, particularly with regard to its settlement and the resulting industrialization of a transcontinental American culture. Hales' second book, William Henry Jackson and the Transformation of the American Landscape used the life's work of Jackson photography as a means to trace the changes in American attitudes toward the land. Over the next decades, Hales' work expanded from the history of photography to wider studies of technology, modernization and land use. He published essays, monographs and catalog essays on topics ranging from the World's Columbian Exposition, methods of rephotographic surveying, the geography of art history survey text and the images of atomic-tests in Life during the Cold War. Hales study of the "forced cultural landscapes" of the Manhattan Project entitled, Atomic Spaces: Living on the Manhattan Project (1997), was named runner-up for the Parkman Prize in American History and winner of the Herbert Hoover Prize in 20th Century American History. He collaborated with a number of photographers and coauthors, including the photographers Mark Klett and Bob Thall. Hales also served as a consultant and photographer for two large urban documentary projects centered in Chicago: the Changing Chicago Project of the later 1980s, for which he photographed social rituals of the upper class, and CITY 2000, for which he served as historian-consultant and contributed large-format images of domestic spaces.

In 2006, Hales published an extensively revised and enlarged version of his first book, now renamed Silver Cities: Photographing American Urbanization, 1839–1939; the revised version included more sophisticated studies of race, ethnicity and gender, and extended the work well into the 20th century, including studies of the urban photography of the Farm Security Administration.

In the beginning of the 21st century, Hales' attention turned to the virtual world, both as subject and as means of gathering and presenting historical and cultural information. With his UIC colleague Robert Bruegmann, Hales developed a website collecting and organizing visual documentation of the Chicago built environment, the Chicago Architecture Imagebase ; in addition, he developed a collaborative public-history project on the postwar American suburb, Levittown, Long Island, In April 2014, Hales' work, Outside the Gates of Eden: The Dream of America From Hiroshima to Now—a continuation of his Silver Cities project—was released. At the time of his death in the late summer of 2014 Hales had been working on projects exploring the cultural and virtual landscapes of America including extended meditations on freeways, contrails and airports, as well as the development of virtual environments such as MUDs (Multi-user domains), early interactive computer games such as Zork, and more contemporary incarnations of virtual environments like the Sims and Second Life. Following his retirement from teaching in 2012, Hales was granted the status of professor emeritus at UIC.

== Death ==
In the early evening of August 26, 2014, Hales — who was an avid bicycle enthusiast — was killed in an accident involving a motor vehicle near his post-retirement home in Stone Ridge, New York.

== Photography ==
Hales exhibited widely throughout the United States. His photographs also appeared in his own books and in those of other cultural historians.

== Selected exhibitions ==
- Fourth Street Photo Gallery, New York, 1976 (solo)
- Just Imagine Gallery, Austin, Texas, 1977
- Dallas Museum of Fine Arts, 1977
- California Institute for the Arts, 1979
- San Francisco Camerawork, 1981 (solo)
- "Grant Park," Museum of Contemporary Photography, Chicago, 1984
- Society for Contemporary Photography, 1985
- Edwynn Houk Gallery, Chicago, 1985
- "Descriptions," Museum of Contemporary Photography, Chicago, 1985
- "Road and Roadside," Museum of Illinois, Springfield, 1987
- "Road and Roadside," Art Institute of Chicago, 1987
- "Road and Roadside," San Francisco Museum of Modern Art, 1988
- "The Illinois Photographers' Project," Museum of Contemporary Photography, Chicago, 1987
- "Gates of Eden: Americans and the Land," Chicago Public Library Cultural Center, June and July 1988 (one-person)
- "Chicago: Inside and Out," Art Institute of Chicago, 1989
- "Changing Chicago," Chicago Historical Society, 1989
- "New Photography," The Museum of Contemporary Photography, 1998

== Bibliography ==
- Hales, Peter Bacon (1984). Silver Cities: The Photography of American Urbanization, 1839–1915 (Revised and enlarged edition, 2006 ed.). Albuquerque: University of New Mexico Press.
- Hales, Peter Bacon (1984). William Henry Jackson. London: Macdonald and Co., Ltd.
- Hales, Peter Bacon; Mark Klett, photographer (1990). One City/Two Visions: San Francisco. San Francisco: Bedford Arts Publishers.
- Hales, Peter Bacon (1993). Construction the Fair: Charles Dudley Arnold and the World's Columbian Exposition. Chicago: Art Institute of Chicago.
- Hales, Peter Bacon; Bob Thall, photographer (1994). The Perfect City: Photographs and Meditations. Baltimore and London: Johns Hopkins University Press.
- Hales, Peter Bacon (1999). Atomic Spaces: Living on the Manhattan Project. Champaign-Urbana: University of Illinois Press.
- Hales, Peter Bacon; Stu Cohen (2007). The Likes of Us: Photography and the Farm Security Administration. Boston: David R. Godine.
- Hales, Peter Bacon (2014). Outside the Gates of Eden: The Dream of America From Hiroshima to Now (2014 ed.). London and Chicago: University of Chicago Press.
