= Exploration and Empire =

History book by William H. Goetzmann

Exploration and Empire: The Explorer and the Scientist in the Winning of the American West
- Author: William H. Goetzmann
- Genre: Non-fiction
- Publisher: Alfred A. Knopf
- Publication place: U.S.

Exploration and Empire: The Explorer and the Scientist in the Winning of the American West is a book by William H. Goetzmann about the exploration of the American West. It won the Pulitzer Prize for History in 1967.
