= Ross Perot 1992 presidential campaign =

American political campaign

Ross Perot for President
- Campaign: 1992 United States presidential election
- Candidate: Ross Perot; President and CEO of Perot Systems (1988–1992); VADM James B. Stockdale; President of the Naval War College (1977–1979)
- Affiliation: Independent
- Status: Announced: February 20, 1992; Withdrawn: July 16, 1992; Re-entered: October 1, 1992; Lost election: November 3, 1992
- Headquarters: Dallas, Texas
- Key people: Hamilton Jordan, campaign manager Ed Rollins, campaign manager Orson Swindle, chief adviser Clayton Mulford, campaign's legal counsel Sharon Holman, press secretary
- Slogan(s): Ross for Boss; I'm Ross, and you're the Boss! Leadership for a Change

In 1992, Ross Perot ran unsuccessfully as an independent candidate for President of the United States. Perot was a Texas industrialist who had never served as a public official, but he had experience as the head of several successful corporations and had been involved in public affairs for the previous three decades. Grass-root organizations sprang up in every state to help Perot achieve ballot access following his announcement on the February 20, 1992, edition of Larry King Live. James Stockdale, a retired Navy vice admiral and Medal of Honor recipient, was chosen as Perot's running mate.

Perot focused the campaign on his plans to balance the federal budget, further economic nationalism, strengthen the war on drugs, and implement "electronic town halls" throughout the nation for "direct democracy". His views were described as a combination of "East Texas populism with high-tech wizardry". Supporters saw him as a non-political and witty "folk hero", but critics described him as "authoritarian" and "short-tempered".

Perot largely financed his own campaign and relied on marketing and wide grass roots support. In certain polls, he led the three-way race with Republican nominee George H. W. Bush, the incumbent president, and Governor Bill Clinton of Arkansas, the Democratic nominee. He dropped out in July 1992 amid controversy, but re-entered in October, participating in all three presidential debates. His polling numbers never fully recovered from his initial exit, despite his aggressive use of commercials on prime-time television. Perot appeared on every state ballot as a result of the earlier draft efforts.

In the general election, Clinton defeated Bush while Perot carried no states and received no votes in the Electoral College. However, Perot won several counties, placed second in two states, and finished far ahead of any other candidate in third place overall, receiving close to 18.97 percent of the popular vote, the most won by a non-major-party presidential candidate since Theodore Roosevelt in 1912. Perot remains the only non-major-party presidential candidate since George C. Wallace in 1968 both to win counties and to finish as high as second place in any state.

== Background ==
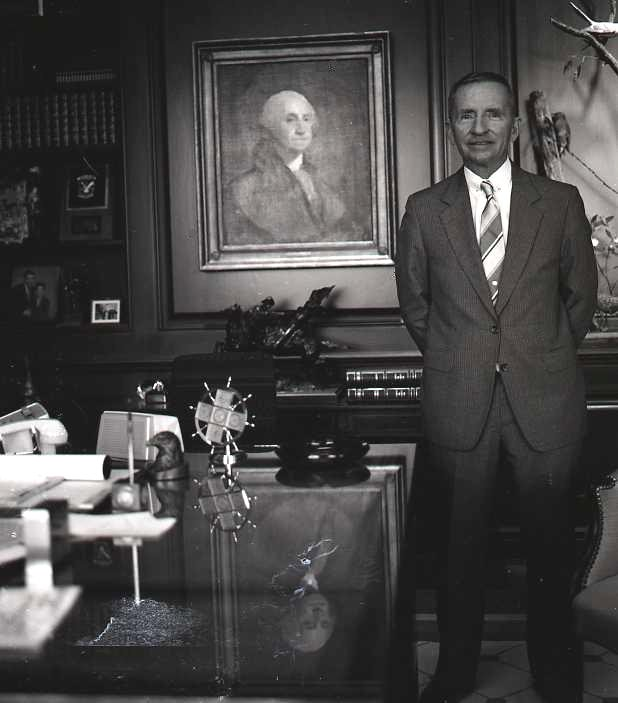
Perot stands next to a portrait of George Washington at his office in 1986.

Ross Perot had never been elected to public office, but he ran several successful corporations and was involved in public affairs for decades. After serving in the United States Navy in the 1950s, Perot joined IBM as a salesman. He surpassed his one-year sales quota in just two weeks. After the company ignored his idea for electronic storage, he founded Electronic Data Systems in 1962, which was then contracted by the United States government to store Medicare records. Perot earned a fortune with the company, and by 1968 was named by Fortune as the "fastest, richest Texan". Perot was known to run the company in a militaristic fashion, built on loyalty and duty. His best known venture with the company was in 1979, when he sent a private militia into Iran in the midst of the Iranian Revolution to rescue two of his employees who had been imprisoned. The episode inspired the 1983 novel On Wings of Eagles. Perot eventually sold his company to General Motors in 1984 for $2.55 billion, and founded Perot Systems in 1988. By 1992, his fortune was judged to be $3 billion (~$6.17 billion in 2025).

Perot was a hawk on the Vietnam War, an advocate for U.S. servicemen held as prisoners of war and a supporter of their families. During the war, he aided soldiers by providing supplies and holding rallies for those returning home. In public affairs, he led the Texas War on Drugs Committee in 1979 at the behest of Republican Governor Bill Clements, and was put in charge of the Select Committee on Public Education in 1983 by Democratic Governor Mark White. Perot's most prominent political effort involved the Vietnam War POW/MIA issue. He worked extensively to free soldiers that he believed had been left behind, and even engaged in secret diplomatic talks with the Vietnamese government, to the chagrin of the Reagan White House. Perot had been supportive of President Ronald Reagan and labeled him as a "great president" in 1986. He even pledged $2.5 million to support his presidential library, but the relationship soured after Perot was sent on a trip to Hanoi, and determined afterwards that the administration was not taking the POW/MIA issue seriously. He revoked his pledge to the library in 1987, based on the POW/MIA issue as well as his disillusionment from the administration's actions during the Iran–Contra affair. He became a critic of the George H. W. Bush administration, and opposed the 1991 Gulf War.

== Initial campaign ==
Ballot access of Ross Perot in the 1992 presidential election. Dark green states are those in which parties were established to put Perot on the ballot, and from his performance in the '92 election became qualified political parties.

Ross Perot appeared on the February 20, 1992, edition of Larry King Live on CNN, his fourth appearance on the show since 1991. After a lively interview concerning political issues, King directly asked Perot if there was "any scenario in which [he] would run for president." Perot firmly stated that he did not want to run, but spontaneously affirmed that he would begin a campaign if "ordinary people" signed petitions and helped him achieve ballot access in all 50 states. He set up a phone bank at his office on March 12, staffed with volunteers to inform interested voters and supporters on how they could assist Perot's potential campaign. Supporters viewed the candidate as an "action man ... who can get things done ... [and who] takes care of his people". They were angry at President Bush for reneging on his promise not to raise taxes. The New York Times speculated that Perot's "iconoclastic, take-no-prisoners persona and anti-politics politics" would appeal to the "angry frustrated electorate". But Republican consultant Karl Rove characterized Perot as an "untested wild man". He rejected any financial donations for more than $5, and stated that he would personally fund a potential campaign. Perot spent $400,000 of his own money in the first month; however, he largely spread this message via television, capped by a March 18 National Press Club speech, which aired on C-SPAN.

=== Draft efforts ===
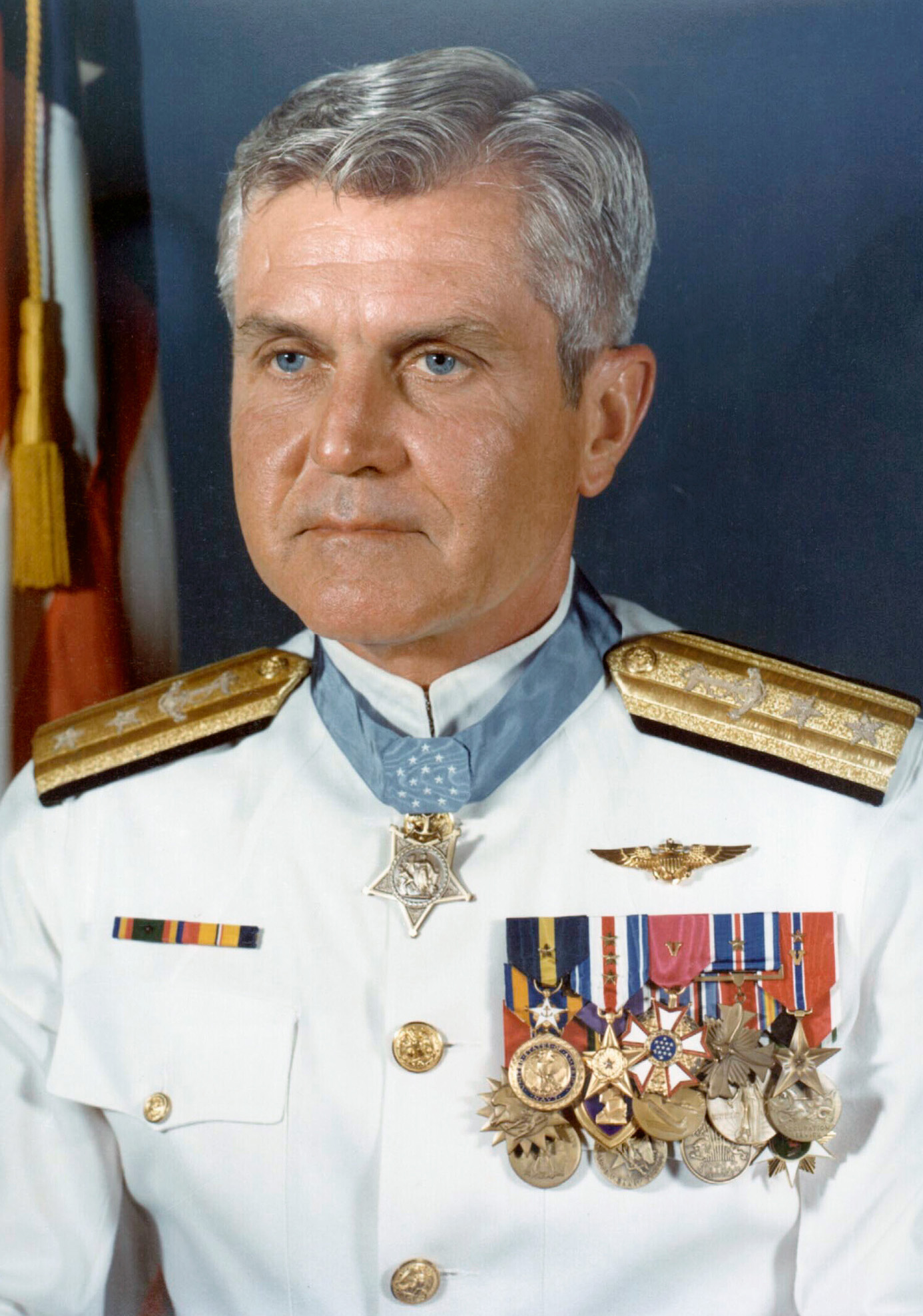
Perot's running mate James Stockdale

"Draft Perot" organizations opened throughout the nation, and petition drives were coordinated largely by Perot's friend Tom Luce, and the real estate arm of Perot Systems, to help secure a place for the candidate on every state ballot. At the height of the efforts, 18,000 simultaneous calls came into Perot's telephone banks after he appeared on The Phil Donahue Show. At one point, 30,000 telephone calls were received in one hour. MCI Communications Corporation reported that over a million calls came in during the first ten days that the phone banks were active. At the time, presidential polls showed Perot with 21% support from the electorate, 14 points behind likely Democratic presidential nominee Bill Clinton and 16 points behind President Bush. Despite this, only one third of potential voters knew enough about Perot to form an opinion of him. A large segment of his support came from Reagan Democrats, entrepreneurs and suburban conservatives deemed "Perot Republicans", who agreed with the central theme of his campaign, though they disagreed with his pro-choice stance on abortion. Political newcomers were also involved in the volunteer efforts.

25 states required that a presidential candidate have a running mate to appear on the ballot. As a result, Perot named retired Vice Admiral James B. Stockdale, who had been awarded the Medal of Honor for his actions during 7 1/2 years of captivity as a POW during the Vietnam War, as his "interim" running mate in late March. Stockdale would remain in the position throughout the campaign. A Boston Globe report suggested that Boston University President John Silber was also considered as a running mate. During an Associated Press interview in April, Perot commented that he might begin a campaign before his supporters achieved ballot access in all states. In New York, ballot access appeared to be the most difficult to attain. In a five-week summer period, the campaign would be required to compile 20,000 signatures from non-primary voters, including 100 from each of half of the state's Congressional districts. Perot conceded that he might not appear on the state's ballot, but stated that he might run anyway.

Throughout April, the draft efforts continued, and Perot appeared on talk shows, discussing his plans and positions on political issues. During an appearance on Larry King Live, Perot stated that he was closer to a decision on a potential campaign, and that he was willing to spend $100 million of his own money to finance it. On the Today show he was interviewed by Katie Couric, and proposed to cut Medicare and Social Security for "people who don't need it". He appeared on Face the Nation later in the month, and argued that wealthy Americans should spend more than average Americans to eliminate the budget deficit. His budget numbers were contested by Tim Russert on Meet the Press during a heated interview, after which a frustrated Perot considered dropping out of the race. C-SPAN ran a speech by Perot, where he announced that he hoped to run a campaign without "political pros" to avoid the "dirty tricks" of past campaigns. After this appearance, campaign consultant Raymond Strother explained to Perot that professionals such as pollster Mark Penn were essential to a successful campaign. In late April, Perot hired former Chicago Tribune editor James Squires as press spokesman to handle the large volume of interview requests from the media. At the end of the month, Perot realized that he had spent too much time visiting talk shows, and announced that he would spend his next few weeks focusing on the issues.

=== Frontrunner status ===
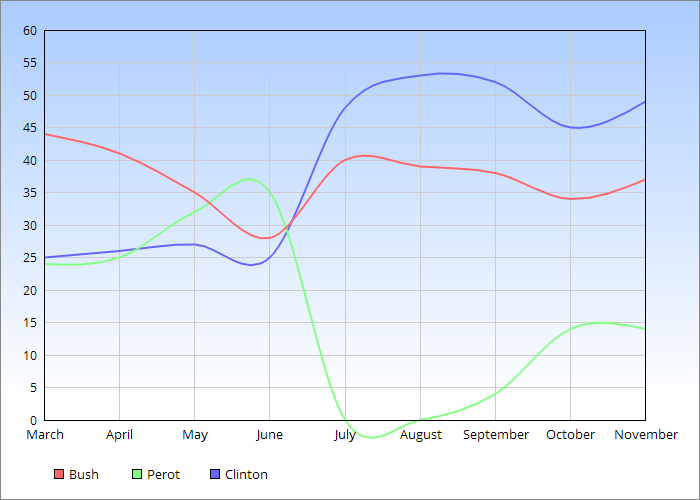
1992 presidential polls

1992
Month	Clinton (D) %	Bush (R) %	Perot (I) %
March	25%	44%	24%
April	26%	41%	25%
May	29%	35%	30%
May	25%	35%	35%
June	26%	30%	38%
June	25%	31%	39%
June	24%	24%	37%
June	24%	32%	34%
June	27%	33%	32%

By May, Perot was leading presidential polls in both Texas and California. The Bush and Clinton campaigns became concerned about a candidacy, and publicly wondered if Perot could continue to "play by his own rules". They attempted to downgrade Perot from his "folk hero status" to that of a politician, by highlighting his "alleged character flaws". Meanwhile, Perot focused on sharpening his political positions as he promised. He hired John P. White, who had served as a budget official under President Jimmy Carter, to work on his budget platform. Meanwhile, petition drives in every state reported that they had secured enough signatures to place Perot on the Election Day ballot. Speculation arose in the media that Perot would split the electoral college and force the United States House of Representatives to decide the presidency. Around this time, Hal Riney, who had worked on Ronald Reagan's 1984 campaign and was known for the "Morning in America" ad, was hired as advertising consultant. When Riney revealed the cost of advertisements during a meeting, Perot reportedly "flipped out", and asked "Why would I spend that when I could go on the Today show for free?" Riney produced several ads during the campaign that never aired.

Perot won a large share of the vote in both the Democratic and Republican primaries in Oregon and Washington in mid-May, although he did not campaign or advertise for those contests. In the Oregon primary, he was written-in by 13% of Democrats and 15% of Republicans. Exit polling showed Perot's favorability at or above that of Clinton and Bush in their respective party's primaries. At the end of May, Perot called on Bush to "climb in the ring", claiming that the President was using surrogates to attack him. To strengthen his own team, Perot's campaign interviewed Jimmy Carter's 1976 campaign manager and White House Chief of Staff Hamilton Jordan and Ronald Reagan's 1984 campaign manager Ed Rollins to fill a position in the campaign. Eventually, both were hired as co-campaign managers. On May 29, Perot ended his talk show hiatus after talking with Barbara Walters on 20/20. He discussed his three-part plan for balancing the budget, starting with a Congressional act to limit spending, followed by a cut in government waste, about which he would be more specific in coming weeks, and a reform of the existing tax system. During the interview, Perot also stated that he would avoid adding homosexuals to his cabinet to prevent "a point of controversy with the American people". However, he commented that "what people do in their private lives is their business."

Former Pat Buchanan pollster Frank Luntz was hired by the campaign, along with former Republican National Campaign Committee chairman Charles Leonard. The New York Times reported that Perot sought the help of operatives to search court and federal documents to find information that might reflect poorly on the potential candidate so that preparations could be made to respond. In the final round of Democratic and Republican primaries, most notably in California, exit polls revealed that 42% of Republicans and 33% of Democrats favored Perot. A Time magazine poll found that Perot had 37% support of all the electorate, ahead of both Bush and Clinton who tied for second at 24%. At this time, Vice President Dan Quayle became the most senior member of the Bush administration to criticize Perot, calling him a "temperamental tycoon".

Perot campaigned in California in mid-June, and held a rally attended by 7,000 in Sacramento where he was heckled by some who chanted "Talk about the issues!" He privately spoke with black and Asian leaders in Los Angeles to discuss race relations following the L.A. race riots; afterwards, he gave a speech to a mostly white audience in Orange County about race relations, but did not take a stand on affirmative action. Perot finished his California campaign swing in Irvine before traveling to events in Colorado and Massachusetts. At the end of the month, large nominating conventions were held in Washington and other states to put together the final pieces to include Perot on the ballot. Perot addressed the conventions, largely made up of "well dressed, middle aged" individuals, and spoke of improving the education system and restoring the America "where you leave the doors unlocked". As June came to a close, speculation arose that Perot was planning a National Convention to follow the Democratic and Republican National Conventions.

== Decline and withdrawal ==
In July, some of Perot's past actions, including a private investigation of the Bush family in the late 1980s, circulated in the media, causing frustration for the campaign. Perot blamed the reports on a "Republican research team" and claimed that he was warned that since he had such a "clean record they have got to try to redefine you and destroy you". Campaign officials tried to come up with a new strategy to combat the negative press, and to end Perot's use of generalizations on the issues. Perot sought National Institutes of Health head Dr. Bernadine Healy as his running mate, but she declined. Meanwhile, Perot faced obstacles on the campaign trail. During an Olympia rally, he was approached by local members of ACT UP, a gay rights group, demanding that he address AIDS and gay rights; he soon flipped on the issue and stated that he would allow gays to serve in the military and in his cabinet. During an address to the National Association for the Advancement of Colored People (NAACP), Perot faced his toughest demographic, and made the gaffe of referring to African Americans as "you people". It was later revealed that Perot did not want to appear at the meeting or any other forum without his supporters. Press consultant Squires had written a speech for Perot for the occasion, but he instead used his own. After the speech, Perot was concerned that members of the New Black Panther Party were plotting his assassination.

By mid-July, The Washington Post reported that Perot's campaign managers were becoming increasingly disillusioned by his unwillingness to follow their advice to be more specific on issues, and his need to be in full control of operations with such tactics as forcing volunteers to sign loyalty oaths. Perot's poll numbers began to slip to 25%, and his advisers warned that if he continued to ignore them, he would fall into single digits. Co-manager Hamilton Jordan threatened to quit, and on July 15, Ed Rollins resigned after Perot fired advertisement specialist Hal Riney, who had worked with Rollins on the Reagan campaign. Rollins later claimed that a member of the campaign accused him of being a Bush plant with ties to the CIA. Amidst the chaos, Perot's support fell to 20%. The next day, Perot announced on Larry King Live that he would not seek the presidency. He explained that he did not want the House of Representatives to decide the election if the result caused the electoral college to be split. He asked his supporters to look for other candidates to nominate for the race, and formed United We Stand to "influence the debate". At this point, Perot had spent $12 million of his own money on the race. Bill Hillsman, who produced a few unaired advertisements for the campaign, wrote that Perot's withdrawal was a tactic to find temporary relief from the press.

Former advisors commented that Perot, who had achieved ballot access in 24 states, was unwilling "to spend money on things that mattered" including Rollins' and Jordan's proposed $150 million advertising campaign, was "obsessed" with his image, and lost interest in running after receiving negative press. Supporters were angry and distraught at Perot's decision, and his popularity dropped among the American public. One woman called Perot and commented that "the tears have not stopped." A class action lawsuit was filed in Florida to force him to remain in the race, but it was dropped. Later in July, the economic plan that Perot's campaign had been working on was released. The fifty-page proposal included cuts in domestic spending, investment in education, communication and transportation programs, an increase in income taxes for the wealthy, and an increase in the gasoline tax. The plan was projected to eliminate the budget deficit in five years. At the end of August, Perot promised to give his endorsement to any candidate that supported his economic plan, but hinted that he might reenter the race. These hints increased in September, as Perot looked to buy advertising time on the major networks to discuss his economic plan, which could only occur if he was a declared candidate. Meanwhile, petitions for ballot access were approved in all 50 states, and polls showed Perot still in double digits with 14% support, behind Clinton and Bush with 44% and 39%, respectively.

== Re-entrance ==
On October 1, Perot re-entered the presidential race, with a desire to further explain his economic plans to the American people. The New York Times commented that Perot's "chances of winning are much less than when he quit in July. His only dim practical hope is to confuse and destabilize the contest." He hoped to spend more resources using paid advertisements than holding traditional rallies to spread his message. During the last month of campaigning, Perot left his headquarters in Dallas only to appear in the presidential debates and seven rallies. One aide later commented, "he wanted to do it just like he could go to the office every day, run for president, and go home and eat dinner." Rather than using professional advisers, Perot employed "political amateurs" whose loyalty was unquestioned. Orson Swindle, whom he had known since the 1970s, was hired as the top aide. Perot's son-in-law Clayton Mulford, who was involved in the early draft effort, was hired as legal adviser. Sharon Holman, who had worked for Perot since 1969, was hired as press secretary, and friend Murphy Martin was added as the media chief.

Perot employed a massive marketing strategy, spending $34.8 million to buy half hour and hour-long segments on major television networks, memorably using charts to illustrate his ideas for the economy. His first infomercial was aired on October 6, and viewed by 16.5 million people. He used two dozen charts and a metal pointer during the ad, explaining that "We got into trickle-down economics and it didn't trickle." He later concluded that "our President blames Congress, Congress blames the President, the Democrats and Republicans blame each other. Nobody steps up to the plate and accepts responsibility for anything." He spent a large portion of the infomercial speaking into the camera while sitting at a desk in front of a bookshelf. Political experts commented that the nature of the ad was groundbreaking. Two days later, an ad campaign was unveiled that included three new 60-second commercials to air on ESPN, CNN and five other cable networks. One commercial entitled "Red Flag" displayed a waving red flag with a background drum roll and the statement: "While the Cold War is ending another war is upon us. In this new war, the enemy is not the red flag of Communism, but the red ink of our national debt, the red tape of our government bureaucracy. The casualties of this war are counted in lost jobs and lost dreams." A second half hour infomercial was shown on October 9.

=== Debates ===
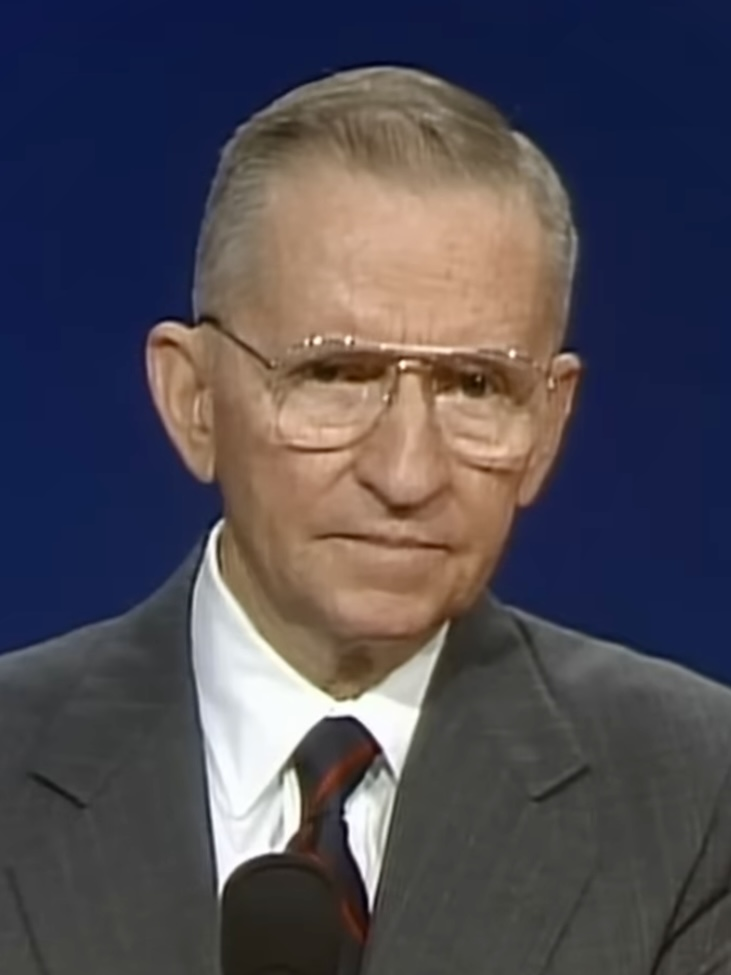
Perot during the first 1992 debate, listening to Boston Globe correspondent and debate panelist John Mashek ask him a question about post-Cold War foreign policy

Perot participated in the first of three presidential debates for the 1992 election, on October 11 in Clayton, Missouri, along with George Bush and Bill Clinton. It was the first time that an independent and a non-major-party candidate was involved in a national televised debate since John B. Anderson in 1980 and was the first general-election presidential debate to ever feature three candidates. During the event, Perot discussed a wide range of issues including the budget deficit, education, and drug use and proclaimed that, as president, he would eliminate the influence of lobbyists. He also had a few memorable quips. When asked to address detractors' criticism of his lack of government experience, he remarked: "Well, they've got a point. I don't have any experience running up a $4 trillion debt." When discussing what would happen if one of his opponents won, he commented: "Then they will have heard the harsh reality of what we have to do. I'm not playing Lawrence Welk music here tonight." After the debate, three out of four polls declared Perot as the winner. The average of all four showed Perot at 37% followed by Clinton with 30% and Bush with 18%, but election polls still showed Perot in third with 14%, far behind both Bush and Clinton. His running mate, James Stockdale, participated in a vice presidential debate in Atlanta, with fellow vice presidential nominee Al Gore and Vice President Dan Quayle. Largely unknown to the general public, Stockdale memorably opened the debate by unexpectedly asking the philosophical question, "Who am I? Why am I here?" He was unprepared to deal with some of the substantive issues raised, and his struggling performance may have damaged the Perot campaign.

The second presidential debate was held on October 15 in Richmond, Virginia, and included questions from undecided voters, who kept the candidates focused on the issues. During his opening statement, Perot explained that there was a "giant sucking sound" caused by the rush of manufacturing jobs to Mexico. During one exchange, Perot commented that Democrats and Republicans were both to blame for the deficit, but that neither was willing to take responsibility. He joked "somewhere out there, there's an extraterrestrial that's doing this to us, I guess." At the close of the debate, Perot described himself as "results ... [and] action oriented", and explained that "if they want to keep slow dancing and talk about it and not do it, I'm not your man." Perot took part in the third debate held in East Lansing, Michigan, on October 19. Throughout the debate, he plugged and referenced his infomercials. He criticized Bush's economic plan to start off the debate, stating that it would not balance the budget. He later remarked that he would spend $60 million of his own money to finish the race. Notably, Perot brought up the fact that "both parties have foreign lobbyists on leaves and key roles in the campaigns." After the debate, he ripped the media during a press conference, criticizing them for their use of "gotcha" stories and the lack of coverage concerning his opponent Bush's foreign lobbyists. Former pollster Frank Luntz explained, "When Ross Perot uses his head, he's unbeatable. He's focused, straightforward and compelling. When he uses his heart, sometimes his emotions get carried away."

=== Final stages ===
Perot showing a chart of the federal budget deficit in his first infomercial. During the broadcast, he named his pointer a "voodoo stick", a play on Bush calling Reagan's tax policy "voodoo economics" in the 1980 Republican presidential primary.

In the week following the debates, Perot did not campaign and was not often seen on television. ABC aired a 30-minute sequel to an autobiographical infomercial shown on October 17. The spot cost Perot $370,000. CBS aired an infomercial on October 24 entitled The Ross Perot Nobody Knows, and two days later another was shown on ABC, preceding the kickoff of Monday Night Football, which cost $940,000. Perot hoped to better explain his earlier exit as Election Day neared. Reports circulated that a security official from the campaign had contacted the Dallas Police in August to urge them to perform a sting operation targeting Bush campaign adviser James Oberwetter, in response to allegations that Republicans planned to wiretap Perot's office. Perot claimed during an interview with 60 Minutes that "Republican operatives" also threatened to disrupt his daughter's wedding, which forced him to withdraw in July. He reported the story to the FBI, but no evidence of any wrongdoing was found. The New York Times argued that the story could help Perot with voters and his overall image by presenting him as a man "who was willing to give up his goal to protect his family"; nevertheless, his lack of evidence drew criticism.

By the end of October, Perot had reached 20% in opinion polls, and his favorability ratings slightly increased. But as reports detailed Perot's investigation of campaign volunteers and the prior use of "loyalty oaths", the numbers remained stagnant. Aides hoped to shift the focus of the campaign and media reports back to the economy. Perot appeared on Larry King Live later in the week and opined that the early 1990s recession was not over "because of deficit spending and competition for money". He was also interviewed on Talking with David Frost, where he affirmed a statement made by his running mate that the Vietnam War protests had prolonged the war effort. In the final days, it was estimated that Perot spent $5 million a day on advertisements. Overall, he had spent $40 million in October alone, and $60 million overall during the course of the campaign.

In the lead up to Election Day, Perot attended a few rallies in Pennsylvania, New Jersey, and Denver. A major rally was staged in Tampa, and was attended by more than 10,000 supporters. Perot also made stops in Kansas City, Los Angeles and Santa Clara. On the final night, infomercials aired on all three major networks. He held his final campaign event in Dallas outside his headquarters, and thanked his supporters, stating: "What you've been through hasn't been pretty, but by golly, you're taking your country back." At the end, his campaign song "Crazy" by Patsy Cline was played. In the final NBC-Wall Street Journal poll, Perot was in third place with 15%, behind Bush with 36% and Clinton with 44%.

== Endorsements ==
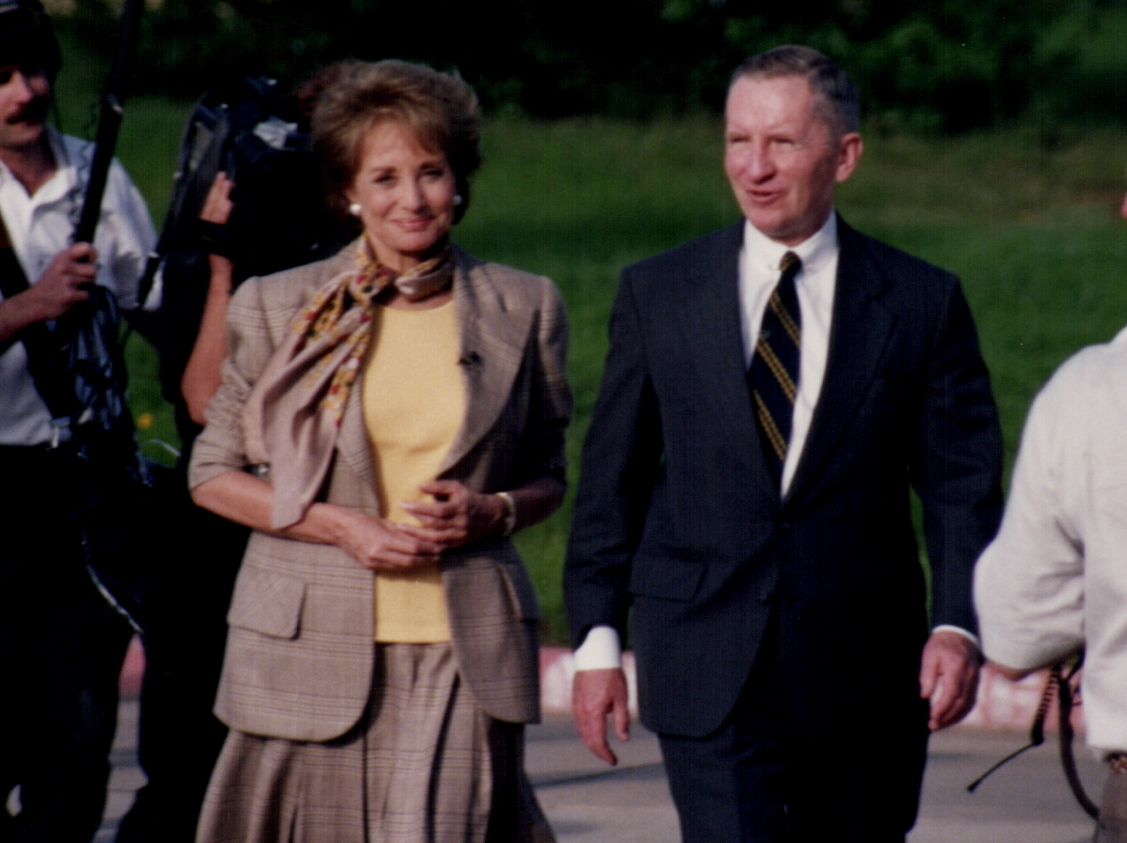
Barbara Walters walks with Ross Perot toward Bryce's Cafeteria in Texarkana, Texas

- Kirstie Alley, actor
- Joe Don Baker, actor
- Johnny Cash, singer
- John Connally, former United States Treasury Secretary
- Richard Crenna, actor
- Jamie Farr, actor
- Sally Field, actor
- Merle Haggard, singer
- Cecil Heftel, former U.S. Representative from Hawaii
- Katharine Hepburn, actress
- Kris Kristofferson, actor and singer
- Norman Lear, television screenwriter and producer
- Steve Martin, actor and comedian
- Dennis Miller, comedian
- Willie Nelson, singer
- Jack Nicholson, actor

== Results ==
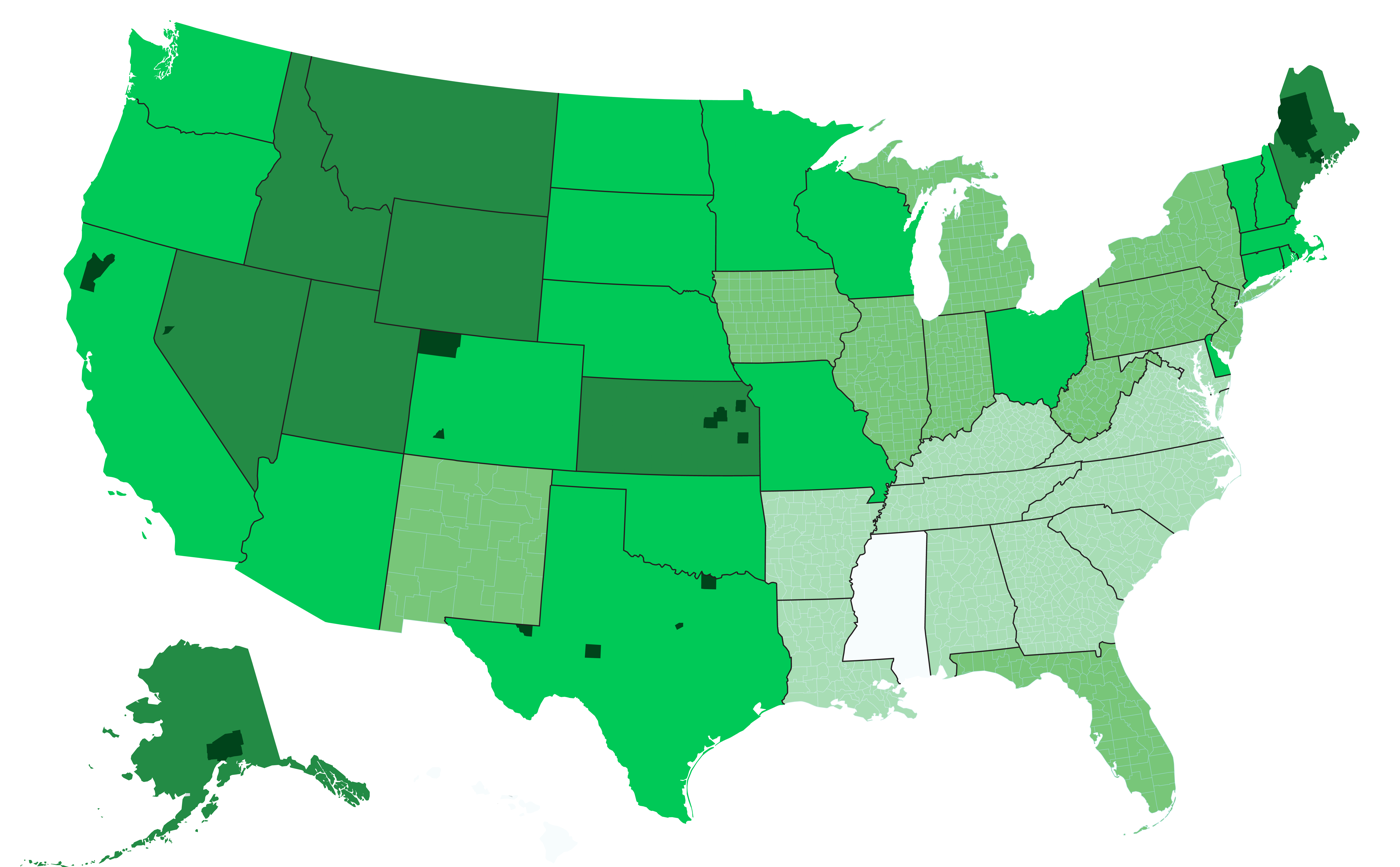
County won by Perot >30% state support 25%–30% state support 20%–25% state support 15%–20% state support 10%–15% state support <10% state support

On Election Day, Perot finished in third place behind Clinton (the winner) and Bush. Perot received 19,743,821 votes, the most ever received by a non-major-party candidate, which accounted for 18.91% of the popular vote. He failed to win any states in the Electoral College because of the relatively even distribution of his support, but did win over 30% of the vote in Maine and 27% in Utah, finishing second in both states. Perot was the first non-major-party candidate since George Wallace in 1968 to finish first in a county. Notably, Perot managed to win counties in states won by Clinton (specifically California, Colorado, Maine and Nevada) as well as in states carried by Bush (these being Alaska (divided into boroughs), Kansas and Texas). He won his largest percentage in Denali Borough, Alaska (with 38.50%) and Loving County, Texas (with 46.88%). He finished second ahead of either Bush or Clinton in a further 345 counties. According to exit polls, 52% of Perot's supporters were male, 94% were white, 63% were aged between 18 and 44, and about 2/3 had not received a college degree. The income of supporters mirrored the general public. In terms of ideology, 53% identified as moderates, 27% were conservative and 20% were liberal, while two-thirds were either members of the Democratic Party or were politically independent.

Perot's performance satisfied the 5% popular vote threshold for non-major-party candidates, classifying it as successful under the criterion established by scholar Walter Dean Burnham. The legitimacy of this success has been questioned by scholars who dismiss the label of Perot as a typical non-major-party candidate, largely due to the availability of campaign funds and financing of grassroots efforts. Others dispute these claims and point out that Perot forced the other candidates to change their rhetoric on the issues to gain the votes of his supporters, indicating an issues campaign.

Exit polls revealed that 35% of voters would have voted for Perot if they believed he could win. Contemporary analysis reveals that Perot could have won the election if the polls prior to the election had shown the candidate with a larger share, preventing the wasted vote mindset. Notably, had Perot won that potential 35% of the popular vote, he would have carried 32 states with 319 electoral votes, more than enough to win the presidency.

=== Analysis ===
The effect of Ross Perot's candidacy has been a contentious point of debate for many years. In the ensuing months after the election, various Republicans asserted that Perot had acted as a spoiler, enough to the detriment of Bush to lose him the election. While many disaffected conservatives may have voted for Ross Perot to protest Bush's tax increase, further examination of the Perot vote in the election night exit polls not only showed that Perot siphoned votes nearly equally among Bush and Clinton, but of the voters who cited Bush's broken "No New Taxes" pledge as "very important", two-thirds voted for Bill Clinton. A mathematical look at the voting numbers reveals that Bush would have had to win 12.55% of Perot's 18.91% of the vote, 66.36% of Perot's support base, to earn a majority of the vote, and would have needed to win nearly every state Clinton won by less than five percentage points. Furthermore, Perot was most popular in states that strongly favored either Clinton or Bush, limiting his real electoral impact for either candidate. Other than his home state of Texas, Perot gained relatively little support in the Southern states, and most of his best results were in states with few electoral votes. Perot appealed to disaffected voters all across the political spectrum who had grown weary of the two-party system. Perot's anti-NAFTA stance played a role in his support, and Perot voters were relatively moderate on hot button social issues such as abortion and gay rights.

A 1999 study in the American Journal of Political Science estimated that Perot's candidacy hurt the Clinton campaign, reducing "Clinton's margin of victory over Bush by seven percentage points." In 2016, FiveThirtyEight described the speculation that Perot was a spoiler as "unlikely".

== Aftermath ==
After the election, Perot continued to work with "United We Stand" and focused his efforts to defeat the North American Free Trade Agreement (NAFTA). In 1993, he was involved in a highly publicized debate with Vice President Al Gore on Larry King Live over NAFTA. Perot formed the Reform Party of the United States of America in 1995, and ran for president under the party's banner the following year. During the election, he failed to appear in the presidential debates, and finished in third place with about 8% of the vote, behind Republican nominee Bob Dole and President Bill Clinton. The Reform Party's candidate, former professional wrestler Jesse Ventura, was elected as Governor of Minnesota in 1998, which was connected to Perot's performance in the presidential elections. His focus on a balanced budget during his campaigns is speculated to have brought the issue to the forefront, enabling the surplus of the late 1990s.

Perot declined to run in the 2000 presidential election, and endorsed eventual winner Republican Governor George W. Bush of Texas.

In the 2008 Republican primaries, he endorsed Republican Governor Mitt Romney of Massachusetts for the presidency, and stated "the situation in 1992 was not nearly as bad as it is now ... if ever there was a time when it was necessary to put our house in order, it is now."

The populist Tea Party movement and supporters of President Donald Trump have both been compared to Perot advocates. Upon Perot's death from leukemia in 2019, Politico editor-in-chief John F. Harris reflected upon Perot's 1992 campaign and referred to him as the "father of Trump" due to Trump's 2016 presidential victory as, like Perot, a populist businessman without traditional political experience.

== Bibliography ==
- Abramson, Paul R.; Aldrich, John H. (1995). "Third-party and independent candidates in American politics: Wallace, Anderson and Perot". Political Science Quarterly. 110 (3): 349. doi:10.2307/2152568. ISSN 0032-3195. JSTOR 2152568.
- Elkind, Peter (December 1988). "Can Ross Perot Save America?". Texas Monthly. 16 (12). ISSN 0148-7736.
- Gilbert, Bill; King, Larry (1994). How to talk to anyone, anytime, anywhere: the secrets of good communication. New York: Crown Publishers. ISBN 978-0-517-88453-9.
- Hillsman, Bill (2004). Run the Other Way: Fixing the Two-Party System, One Campaign at a Time. Simon and Schuster. ISBN 978-0-7432-2446-8.
- Jelen, Ted G. (2001). Ross for boss: the Perot phenomenon and beyond. SUNY Press. ISBN 978-0-7914-4853-3.
- Kurtz, Howard (1997). Hot air: all talk, all the time. New York: Basic Books. ISBN 978-0-465-03074-3.
- Rapoport, Ronald B.; Stone, Walter J. (2007). Three's a Crowd: The Dynamic of Third Parties, Ross Perot, and Republican Resurgence. University of Michigan Press. ISBN 978-0-472-03099-6.
- Sifry, Micah (2002). Spoiling For a Fight: Third-Party Politics in America. New York: Routledge. ISBN 978-0-415-93142-7.
- Wakin, Edward (2002). How TV Changed America's Mind. New York: iUniverse. ISBN 978-0-595-25264-0.
