= Giant sucking sound =

Slang phrase for unwanted labor exportation

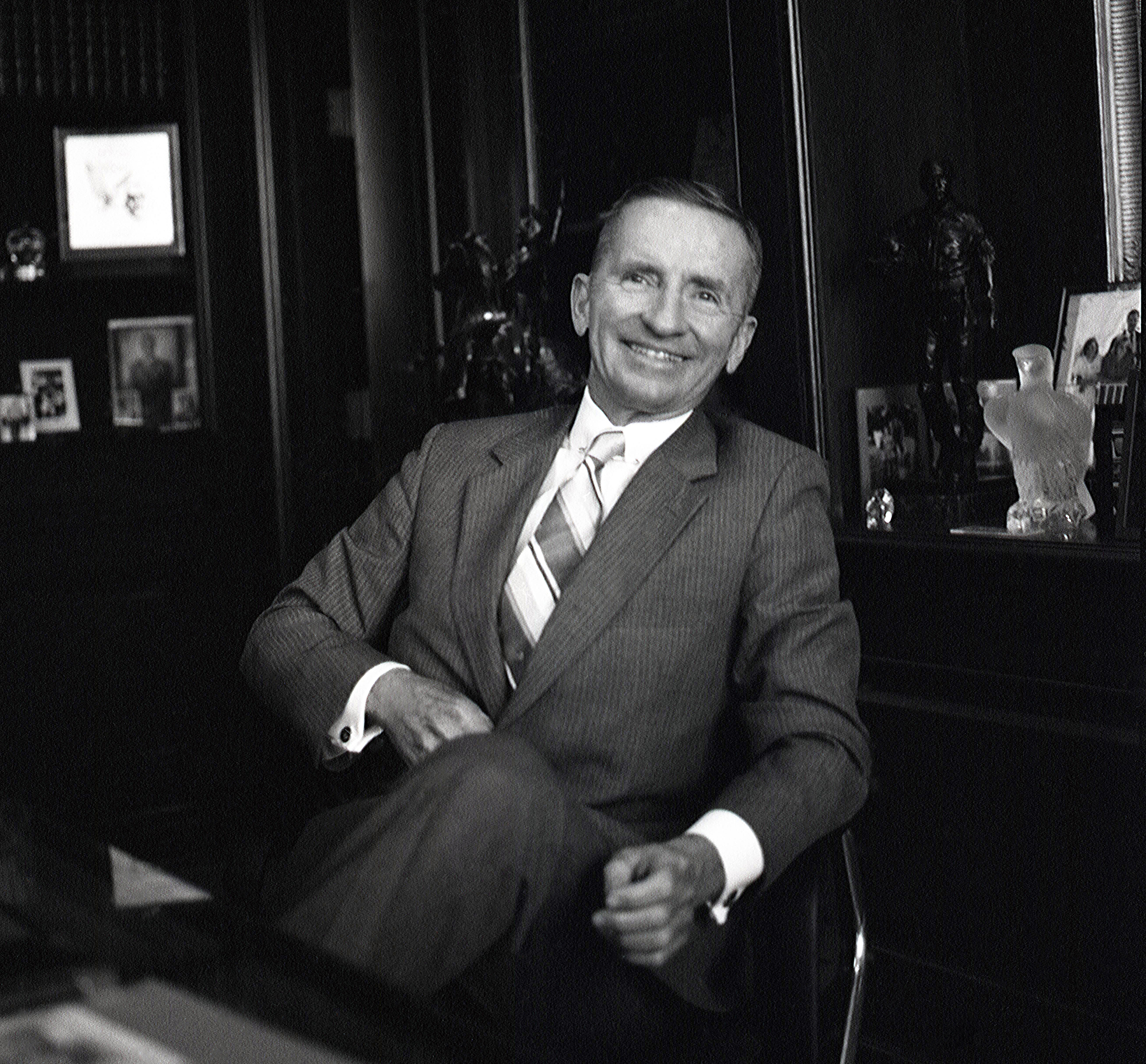
Ross Perot, who coined the phrase "giant sucking sound"

The "giant sucking sound" was a phrase used by United States presidential candidate Ross Perot, to describe what he believed would be the negative effects of the North American Free Trade Agreement, which he opposed.

== First usage and context ==
The phrase, which Perot coined during his 1992 presidential campaign, referred to the sound of US jobs heading south for Mexico should the free-trade agreement go into effect.

In the second 1992 Presidential Debate, Ross Perot argued:

We have got to stop sending jobs overseas. It's pretty simple: If you're paying $12, $13, $14 an hour for factory workers and you can move your factory South of the border, pay a dollar an hour for labor, ... have no health care—that's the most expensive single element in making a car— have no environmental controls, no pollution controls and no retirement, and you don't care about anything but making money, there will be a giant sucking sound going south.
... when [Mexico's] jobs come up from a dollar an hour to six dollars an hour, and ours go down to six dollars an hour, and then it's leveled again. But in the meantime, you've wrecked the country with these kinds of deals.

Perot ultimately lost the election, and the winner, Bill Clinton, supported NAFTA, which went into effect on January 1, 1994.

== Legacy ==
The phrase has since come into general use to describe any situation involving loss of jobs, or fear of a loss of jobs, particularly by one nation to a rival. Examples include:

- A European Union representative spoke of worrying "about the giant sucking sound from Eastern Europe;"
- Thomas Friedman opined that "the Mexicans ... are hearing 'the giant sucking sound' in stereo these days—from China in one ear and India in the other.
- Columnist Joe Sharkey used the phrase "That Giant Sucking Sound" to introduce a comment about a 34% slump in employment in the US airline industry.
- US Congressman Steve LaTourette (R-OH 14) invoked the catchphrase while criticizing the American Recovery and Reinvestment Act of 2009: "Well, today there's another sucking sound going on in Washington, D.C.. And that's the tightening of sphincters on both ends of Pennsylvania Avenue as people are having to explain who put into the stimulus bill this provision of law."

== See also ==
- Globalization
- NAFTA's impact on US employment
- Nearshoring
- Offshoring
- Outsourcing
- Ross Perot

== Notes ==
The Commission on Presidential Debates and PBS transcribed "job-sucking sound".
