= Monroe Karmin =

American journalist

Monroe William ("Bud") Karmin (September 2, 1929 – January 15, 1999) was an American journalist. He won a Pulitzer Prize in 1967 when working as an investigative reporter for the Wall Street Journal. He also worked at different times for The Chicago Daily News, The Chicago Sun-Times, and Newsday.

== Early life and education ==
He was born in Mineola, New York. He received an undergraduate degree in journalism from the University of Illinois Urbana-Champaign in 1950 and a graduate degree in journalism from Columbia University in 1953.

During the Korean War, he served in the U.S. Air Force from 1950–1952 and was stationed at Mitchel Air Force Base in Long Island, New York.

== Career ==
At various points during his career, Karmin worked as a member of the Washington bureau of the Knight Ridder syndicate and as an investigative reporter for the Wall Street Journal. He also worked for The Chicago Daily News, The Chicago Sun-Times, and Newsday. In 1967, during his tenure at the Wall Street Journal, he and Stanley Penn, a colleague at that newspaper, won the Pulitzer Prize for National Reporting for an article about links between organized crime in the U.S. and gambling enterprises in the Bahamas.

In a January 22, 1980, article, Karmin wrote that "President Carter faces the worst of economic times in his run for re-election, a political nightmare of his own making."

Karmin was a correspondent for U.S. News & World Report from August 1985 to October 1994. He then worked as an editor at large at Bloomberg News.

== Other professional activities ==
Karmin served as secretary of the National Press Club from October 1994 to February 1995. He served as president of the National Press Club from February 1995 to February 1997. At the time he became president of the club, he was editor at large at Bloomberg News, During his tenure as president, he introduced actress Sharon Stone when she gave a talk to the club's members. "Ms. Stone's topic today is wellness, fitness, and a positive attitude", Karmin told the audience. "She's achieved those desirable goals by a simple guide to living well. She never wears underwear".

In a 1995 interview given in his capacity as president of the club, Karmin described it as "the mother of all press clubs" and noted that visiting journalists from the former Soviet Union were "embarking on a new world of freedom of the press" and came to the press club to learn how journalists in the free world operate.

During his tenure as president of the National Press Club, Karmin appeared frequently on C-SPAN, interviewing, introducing, or moderating political and cultural discussions featuring Margaret Thatcher, Rudolph Giuliani, Edward Albee, Lamar Alexander, Newt Gingrich, Paul Tibbetts, Wynton Marsalis Lawton Chiles, Jr., Andy Rooney, Jerry Lewis, and others.

When the National Press Club invited Matt Drudge to give a luncheon address in 1998, Karmin protested. "To glorify him, validate him, credentialize him by giving him a podium, to my mind is a mistake," he said.

== Honors and awards ==
In 1967, he and Stanley Penn shared the 1967 Pulitzer Prize for National Reporting for an article exposing the links between the Mafia in the U.S. and gambling businesses in the Bahamas.

In 1966, Karmin and Penn also won the Sigma Delta Chi Award for distinguished service.

== Personal life ==
He and his wife, Mayanne, had a daughter, Elizabeth, and a son, Paul Karmin. At the time of his death, he had five grandchildren.
