= J. B. Chapman =

Nazarene General Superintendent (1884–1947)

Personal details
- Born: James Blaine Chapman; 1884 Yale, Illinois
- Died: 1947 (aged 62–63)
- Relations: Jim Lehrer (grandson)
- Education: Arkansas Holiness College (BA); Texas Holiness University (BDiv)

James Blaine "J. B." Chapman (1884–1947) was an American minister, academic administrator, and newspaper editor. He served as the president of Arkansas Holiness and Peniel College, editor of the Herald of Holiness, and general superintendent in the Church of the Nazarene.

== Early life and education ==
Chapman was born 1884 in Yale, Illinois, the second son and fifth child of Marinda and Thomas Smith Chapman. The family moved to Oklahoma when he was fourteen years old, where he was converted to Christianity in 1899. Chapman's first academic instructor was his wife, a schoolteacher. When he took a pastorate at Vilonia, Arkansas, in 1908, he enrolled at the Arkansas Holiness College there at age 24. After graduating in 1910, he left to pursue further study at Texas Holiness University in Peniel, Texas, under president Roy T. Williams, where he received his Bachelor of Divinity degree in 1913. Peniel College later awarded him an honorary Doctor of Divinity degree in 1918, and Pasadena College did the same in 1927.

== Career ==
He began to preach at the age of sixteen, uniting with the World's Faith Missionary Association of Shenandoah, Iowa, and then the Texas Holiness Association before forming his own Independent Holiness Church. He married Maud Frederick in 1903, at the church's first annual convention. His first pastorate was a church in Durant, in Indian Territory, which he organized in 1905 and would become part of the Holiness Church of Christ, but he also became pastor of a church in Pilot Point, Texas, in 1907, for which he left Durant in 1908. That same year the Holiness Church of Christ joined the Pentecostal Church of the Nazarene, and Chapman moved again, this time to a pastorate at Vilonia, Arkansas. He left in 1911 after graduating from Arkansas Holiness College to pursue further education at Texas Holiness University. His only other pastorate would later be at Bethany, Oklahoma, from 1918 to 1919.

After enrolling at Peniel in 1910, Chapman instead became president of the Arkansas Holiness College, but returned to Peniel University in 1912 to teach there and became dean of the college upon his arrival. After he graduated with his Bachelor of Divinity degree in 1913, President Williams resigned and the college named Chapman president until 1918. At the time Chapman took the presidency, Peniel was ranked behind Asbury College and Taylor University as the third-best holiness college in the nation, but it eventually closed in 1920 to lend support to Oklahoma Nazarene College instead. As an educator, Chapman aided the General Board of Education of the Church of the Nazarene to establish educational policy. Chapman is quoted as having said:

It was originally the plan to call every school we started a “university”... It was our ultimate aim to have universities and our schools were named according to our vision of future developments. But I am, personally, convinced that we should definitely abandon the idea of building any universities, that we should drop these names from our schools... [Moreover,] it is my conclusion that we... cannot permanently maintain academies and they do not meet our need, that a special Bible school does not meet our needs and that we should express ourselves on this conviction.... That the College, with the necessary fitting school and Bible department[,] is the school that we need and will build."

Chapman would later become editor of the Herald of Holiness from 1921 to 1928 and was then elected general superintendent. He joined the Nazarene community of Quincy, Massachusetts, in 1930, and served as general superintendent until his death in 1947.

A residential dorm on the campus of Olivet Nazarene University is named after Chapman.

== Personal life ==
Through his daughter Lois Catherine (Chapman) Lehrer, he was the grandfather of journalist Jim Lehrer.
