= USS Wichita (LCS-13) =

Littoral combat ship of the United States Navy

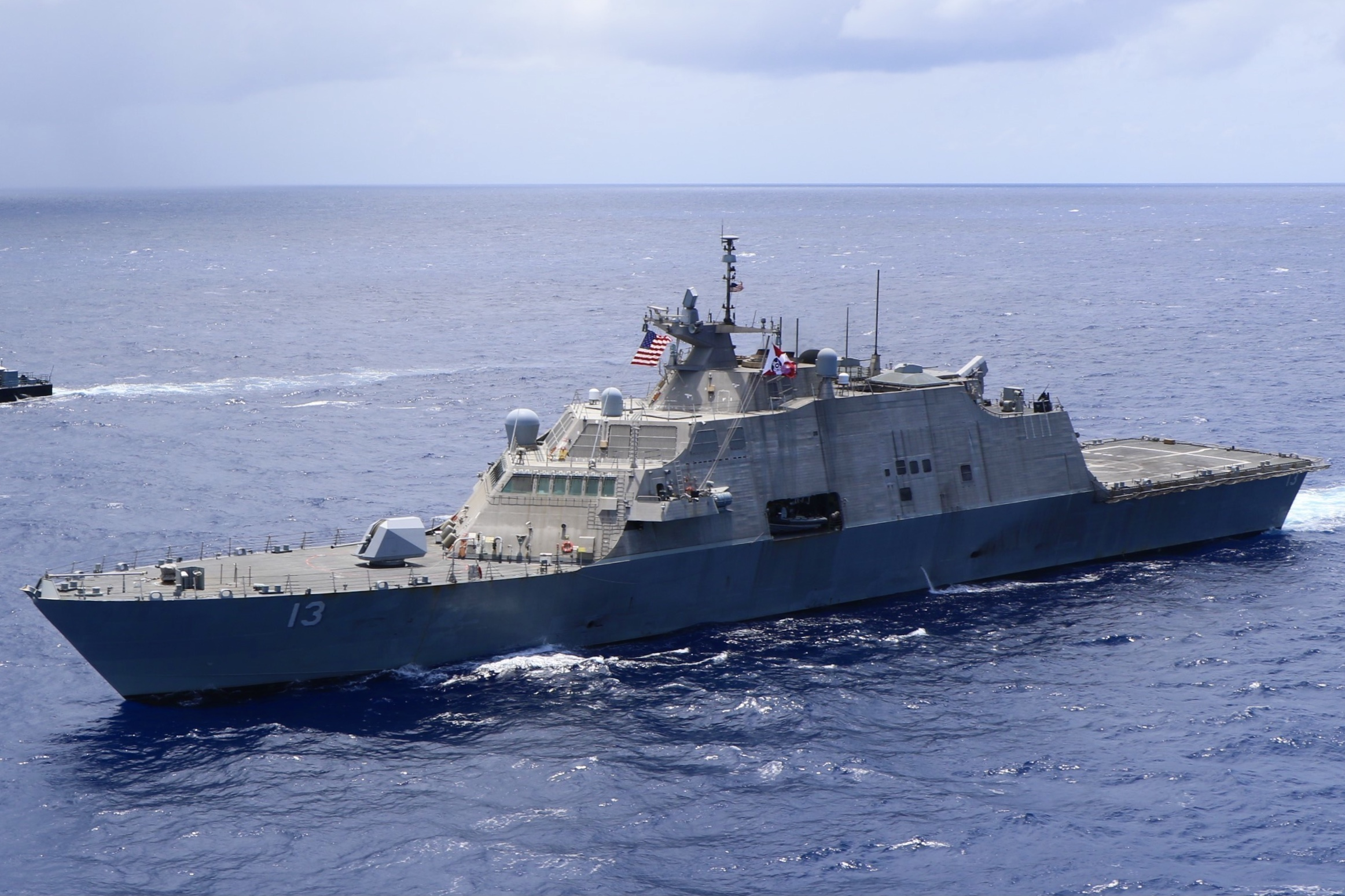
- USS Wichita underway on 9 April 2021

History

United States
- Name: Wichita
- Namesake: Wichita
- Awarded: 4 March 2013
- Builder: Marinette Marine
- Laid down: 9 February 2015
- Launched: 17 September 2016
- Sponsored by: Kate Lehrer
- Christened: 17 September 2016
- Acquired: 22 August 2018
- Commissioned: 12 January 2019
- Home port: Mayport
- Identification: MMSI number: 369970969; Hull number: LCS-13
- Motto: Keeper of the Seas
- Status: Active
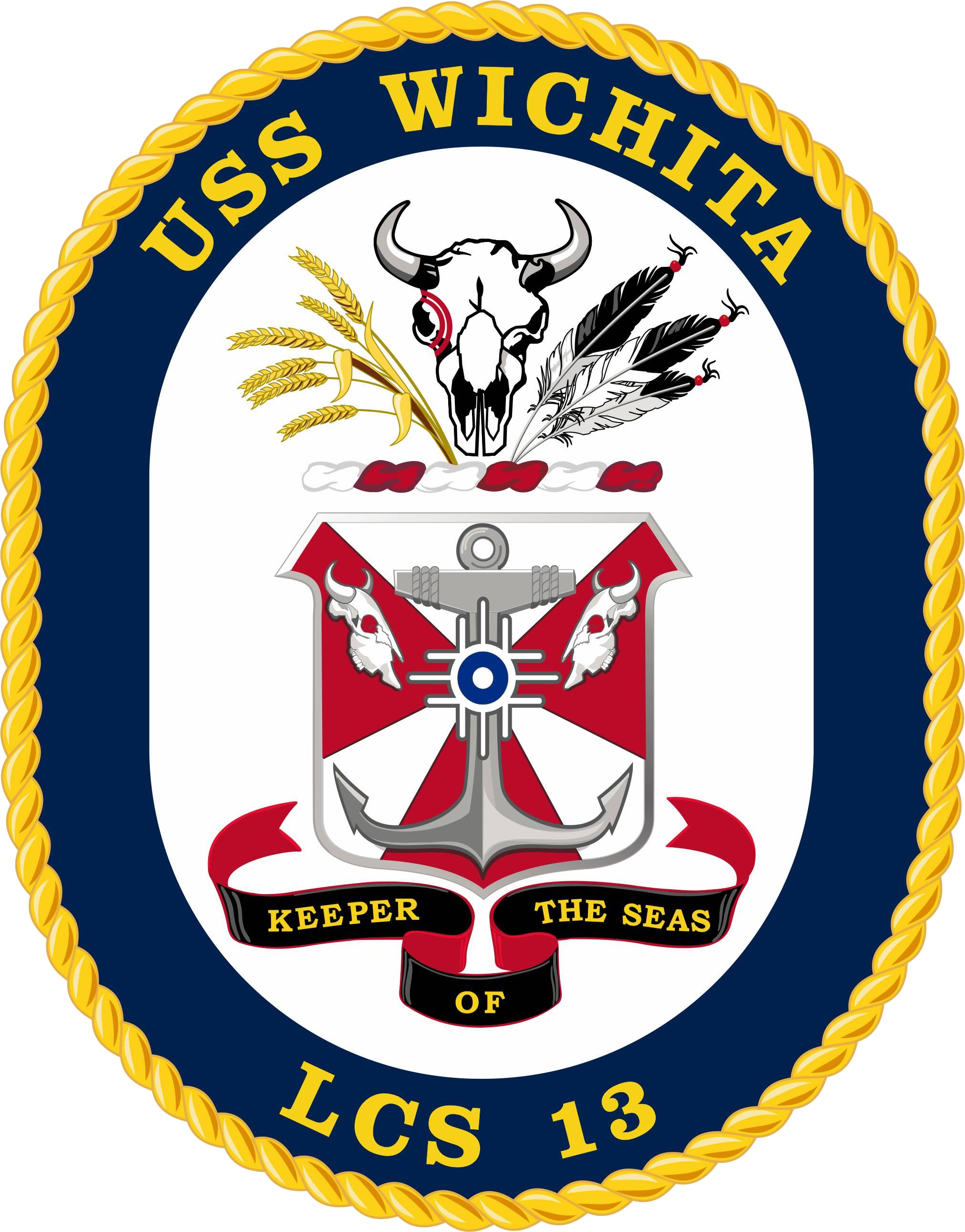
- Badge

General characteristics
- Class & type: Freedom-class littoral combat ship
- Displacement: 3,500 metric tons (3,900 short tons) full load
- Length: 378.3 ft (115.3 m)
- Beam: 57.4 ft (17.5 m)
- Draft: 13.0 ft (4.0 m)
- Propulsion: 2 Rolls-Royce MT30 36 MW gas turbines, 2 Colt-Pielstick diesel engines, 4 Rolls-Royce waterjets
- Speed: 45 knots (52 mph; 83 km/h) (sea state 3)
- Range: 3,500 nmi (6,500 km) at 18 knots (21 mph; 33 km/h)
- Endurance: 21 days (336 hours)
- Boats & landing craft carried: 11 m RHIB, 40 ft (12 m) high-speed boats
- Complement: 131 Core Crew (Training Ship)
- Armament: BAE Systems Mk 110 57 mm gun; RIM-116 Rolling Airframe Missiles; Honeywell Mark 50 torpedo; 4 .50 cal (12.7 mm) guns; can be fitted with up to 2 Mk44 Bushmaster 30 mm guns and "Longbow" Hellfire missiles as part of the surface warfare (SuW) package.
- Aircraft carried: 1 MH-60R/S Seahawks; 2MQ-8 Fire Scout
- Aviation facilities: Flight Deck, Hangar Bay
- Notes: Electrical power is provided by 4 Isotta Fraschini V1708 diesel engines with Hitzinger generator units rated at 800 kW each.

USS Wichita (LCS-13) is a Freedom-class littoral combat ship of the United States Navy, the third ship named after Wichita, the largest city in Kansas.

== Design ==
In 2002, the U.S. Navy initiated a program to develop the first of a fleet of littoral combat ships. The Navy initially ordered two monohull ships from Lockheed Martin, which became known as the Freedom-class littoral combat ships after the first ship of the class, USS Freedom. Odd-numbered U.S. Navy littoral combat ships are built using the Freedom-class monohull design, while even-numbered ships are based on a competing design, the trimaran hull Independence-class littoral combat ship from General Dynamics. The initial order of littoral combat ships involved a total of four ships, including two of the Freedom-class design. Wichita is the seventh Freedom-class littoral combat ship to be built.

Wichita includes additional stability improvements over the original Freedom design; the stern transom was lengthened and buoyancy tanks were added to the stern to increase weight service and enhance stability. The ship also features automated sensors to allow "conditions-based maintenance" and reduce crew overwork and fatigue issues that Freedom had on her first deployment.

== Construction and career ==
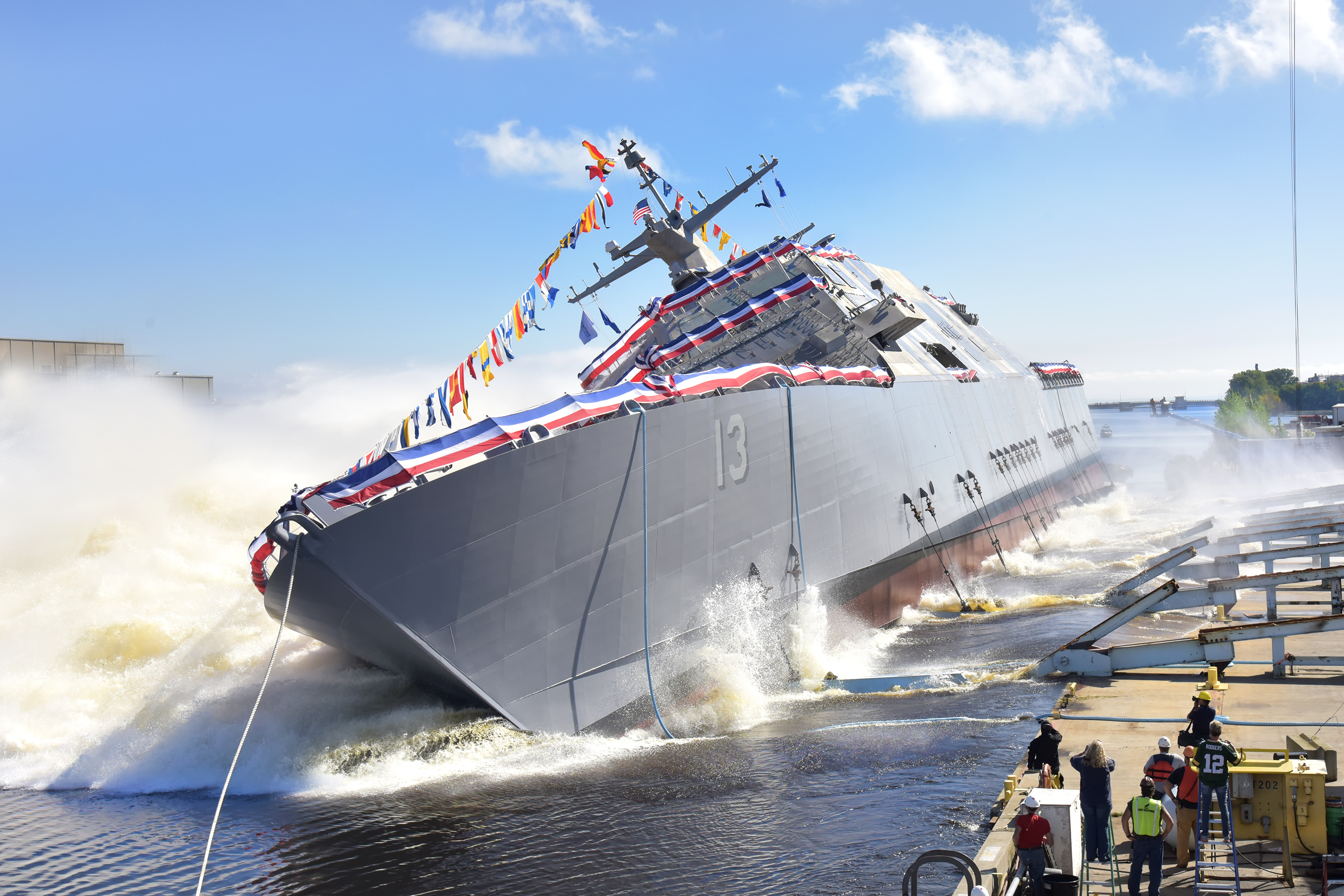
Wichita being launched on 17 September 2016

The keel laying ceremony was on 9 February 2015, at Marinette, Wisconsin. Sponsored by Kate Lehrer, wife of Wichita native Jim Lehrer, the ship was christened and launched on 17 September 2016. The naval crest of the ship incorporates elements of the Wichita flag, along with a bison skull and feathers representing the Native American heritage and wheat to reflect the state of Kansas's main crop. She is assigned to Littoral Combat Ship Squadron Two. The ship was acquired by the US Navy from Lockheed Martin and the Marinette Marine shipyard on 22 August 2018 along with USS Sioux City (LCS-11) in a double delivery.

On 4 November 2020, Rear Admiral Don Gabrielson and Brigadier General Phillip Frietze signed the Joint Force Maritime Component Commander Maritime Campaign Support Plan in a ceremony aboard Wichita at Naval Station Mayport, Florida.

On 25 February 2021, the ship together with Sea Knights of Helicopter Sea Combat Squadron (HSC) 22, detachment 8, was underway to support operations in US Southern Command area of responsibility. On 9 April, Wichita and Jamaica Defence Force Coast Guard patrol vessel HMJS Cornwall sailed in formation during a live-fire exercise. During this time, Wichita was deployed to the US 4th Fleet of operations to support Joint Interagency Task Force South's mission, which included counter illicit drug trafficking in the Caribbean and Eastern Pacific.

On 5 May 2022, Wichita conducted Maritime Interdiction Exercises with the Dominican Navy.

== Awards ==
- CNO Afloat Safety Award (LANTFLT)- (2023)

== Planned decommissioning and possible reprieve ==
It was announced in 2022 that Wichita was one of nine Freedom-class ships that the US Navy was intending to decommission during the 2023 fiscal year, but then on 11 August 2023, the Department of Defense decided that Wichita would undergo a main engine replacement that should save the vessel from early decommissioning.
