= Ship sponsor =

Person selected to provide good luck to a seagoing vessel

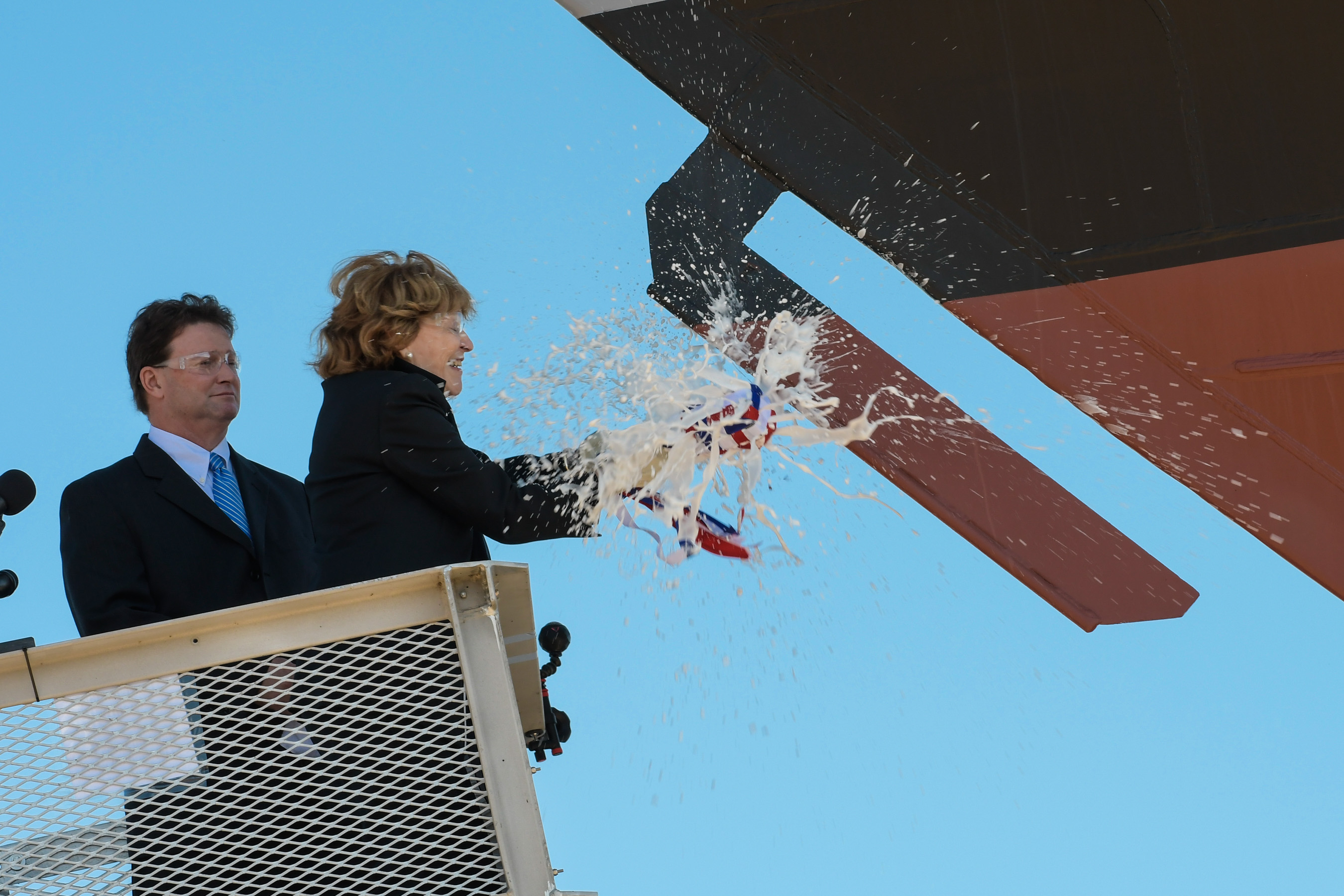
Kate Lehrer, sponsor of USS Wichita (LCS-13), breaks a bottle of champagne on the ship during a christening ceremony in 2016

A ship sponsor, by tradition, is a female civilian who is invited to "sponsor" a vessel, presumably to bestow good luck and divine protection over the seagoing vessel and all that sail aboard. In the United States Navy and the United States Coast Guard, the sponsor is technically considered a permanent member of the ship's crew and is expected to give a part of her personality to the ship, as well as advocate for its continued service and well-being. For passenger ships the sponsor is called a godmother if the sponsor is female, or a godfather if the sponsor is male.

== See also ==
- Ceremonial ship launching (christening)
