= USS Sioux City =

Littoral combat ship of the United States Navy

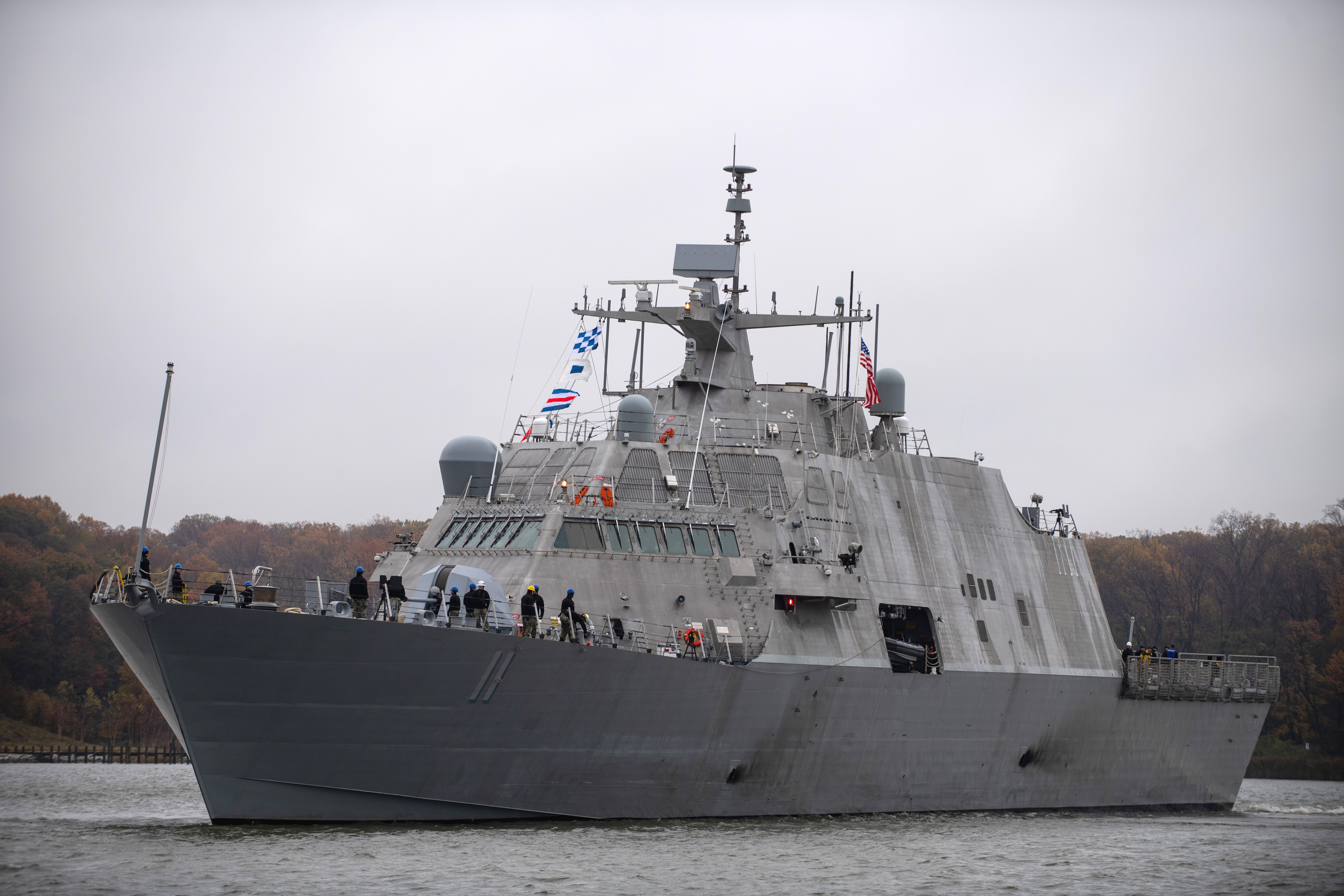
- USS Sioux City underway on the Severn River on 13 November 2018

History

United States
- Name: Sioux City
- Namesake: Sioux City
- Awarded: 16 March 2012
- Builder: Marinette Marine
- Laid down: 19 February 2014
- Launched: 30 January 2016
- Sponsored by: Mary Winnefeld
- Christened: 30 January 2016
- Acquired: 22 August 2018
- Commissioned: 17 November 2018
- Decommissioned: 14 August 2023
- Identification: Hull number: LCS-11
- Motto: Forging a New Frontier
- Status: Stricken, Final Disposition Pending
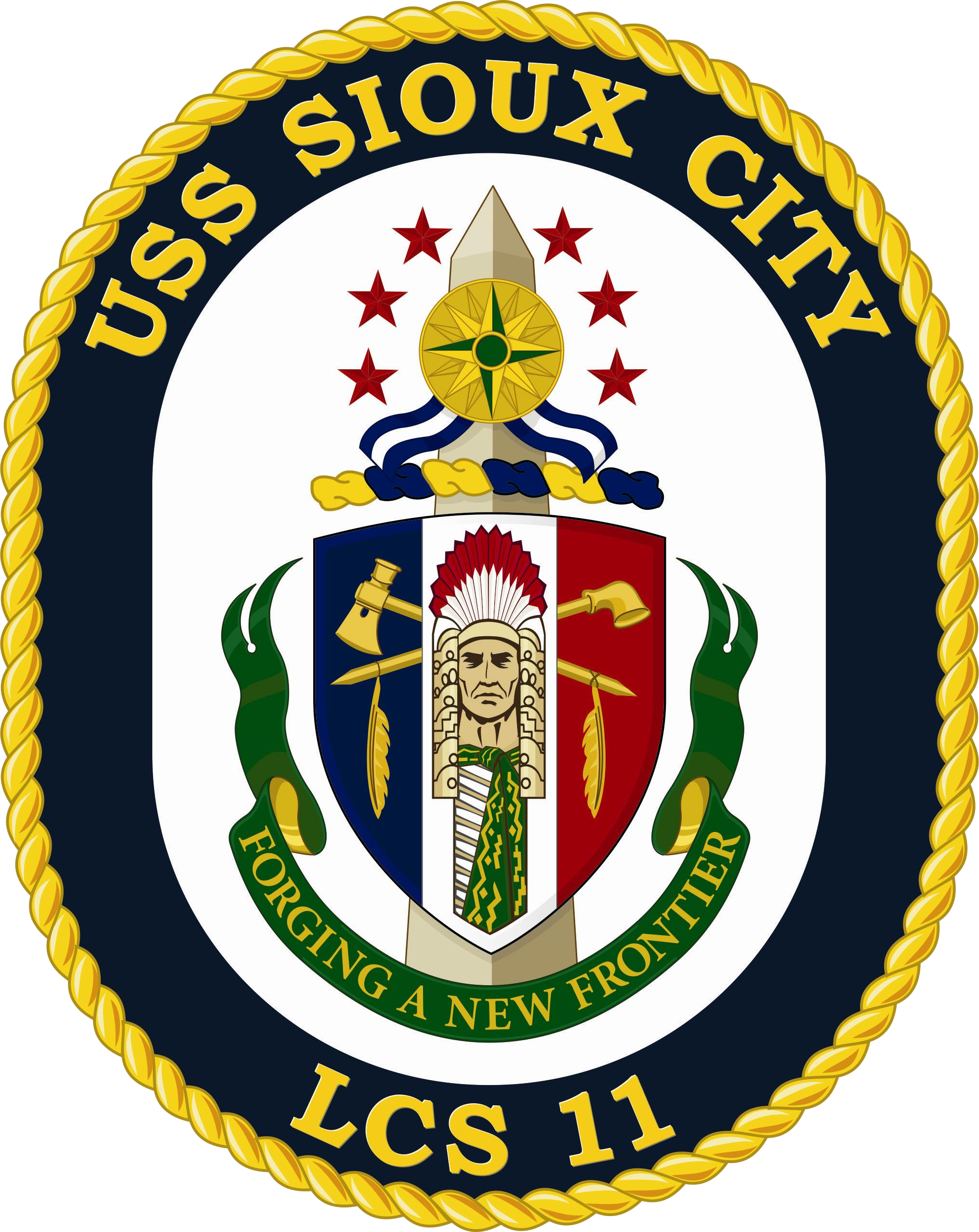
- Badge

General characteristics
- Class & type: Freedom-class littoral combat ship
- Displacement: 3,500 metric tons (3,900 short tons) full load
- Length: 378.3 ft (115.3 m)
- Beam: 57.4 ft (17.5 m)
- Draft: 13 ft (4.0 m)
- Propulsion: 2 Rolls-Royce MT30 36 MW gas turbines, 2 Colt-Pielstick diesel engines, 4 Rolls-Royce waterjets
- Speed: 45 knots (52 mph; 83 km/h) (sea state 3)
- Range: 3,500 nmi (6,500 km) at 18 knots (21 mph; 33 km/h)1,500 nmi (2,800 km) at 50 knots (58 mph; 93 km/h), 4,300 nmi (8,000 km) at 20 knots (23 mph; 37 km/h)
- Endurance: 21 days (336 hours)
- Boats & landing craft carried: 11 m RHIB, 40 ft (12 m) high-speed boats
- Complement: 15 to 50 core crew, 75 mission crew (Blue and Gold crews)
- Armament: BAE Systems Mk 110 57 mm gun; RIM-116 Rolling Airframe Missiles; Honeywell Mk 50 Torpedo; 2 .50 cal (12.7 mm) guns
- Aircraft carried: 2 MH-60R/S Seahawks; MQ-8 Fire Scout
- Notes: Electrical power is provided by 4 Isotta Fraschini V1708 diesel engines with Hitzinger generator units rated at 800 kW each.

USS Sioux City (LCS-11) is a decommissioned Freedom-class littoral combat ship of the United States Navy. She is the first ship named after Sioux City, the fourth-largest city in Iowa.

== Design ==
In 2002, the Navy initiated a program to develop the first of a fleet of littoral combat ships. The Navy initially ordered two monohull ships from Lockheed Martin, which became known as the Freedom-class littoral combat ships after the first ship of the class, USS Freedom. Odd-numbered littoral combat ships are built using the Freedom-class monohull design, while even-numbered ships are based on a competing design, the trimaran hull Independence-class littoral combat ship from General Dynamics. The initial order of littoral combat ships involved a total of four ships, including two of the Freedom-class design. Sioux City was the sixth Freedom-class littoral combat ship to be built.

Sioux City includes additional stability improvements over the original Freedom design; the stern transom was lengthened and buoyancy tanks were added to the stern to increase weight service and enhance stability. The ship will also feature automated sensors to allow "conditions-based maintenance" and reduce crew overwork and fatigue issues that Freedom had on her first deployment.

== Construction and career ==
The ceremonial “laying of the keel” was on 19 February 2014, at Marinette, Wisconsin. The ship was constructed by Fincantieri Marinette Marine and launched on 30 January 2016 after being christened by her sponsor Mary Winnefield, wife of Admiral James A. Winnefeld Jr., USN.

Sioux City was delivered to the Navy by Lockheed Martin and the Fincantieri Marinette Marine shipyard on 22 August 2018 along with sister ship Wichita in a double delivery. The ship was commissioned at the United States Naval Academy in Annapolis, Maryland on 17 November 2018, and then assigned to Littoral Combat Ship Squadron Two.

In September 2020, Sioux City was assigned to the US Southern Command with a United States Coast Guard law enforcement detachment on board to help perform counter-narcotics operations.

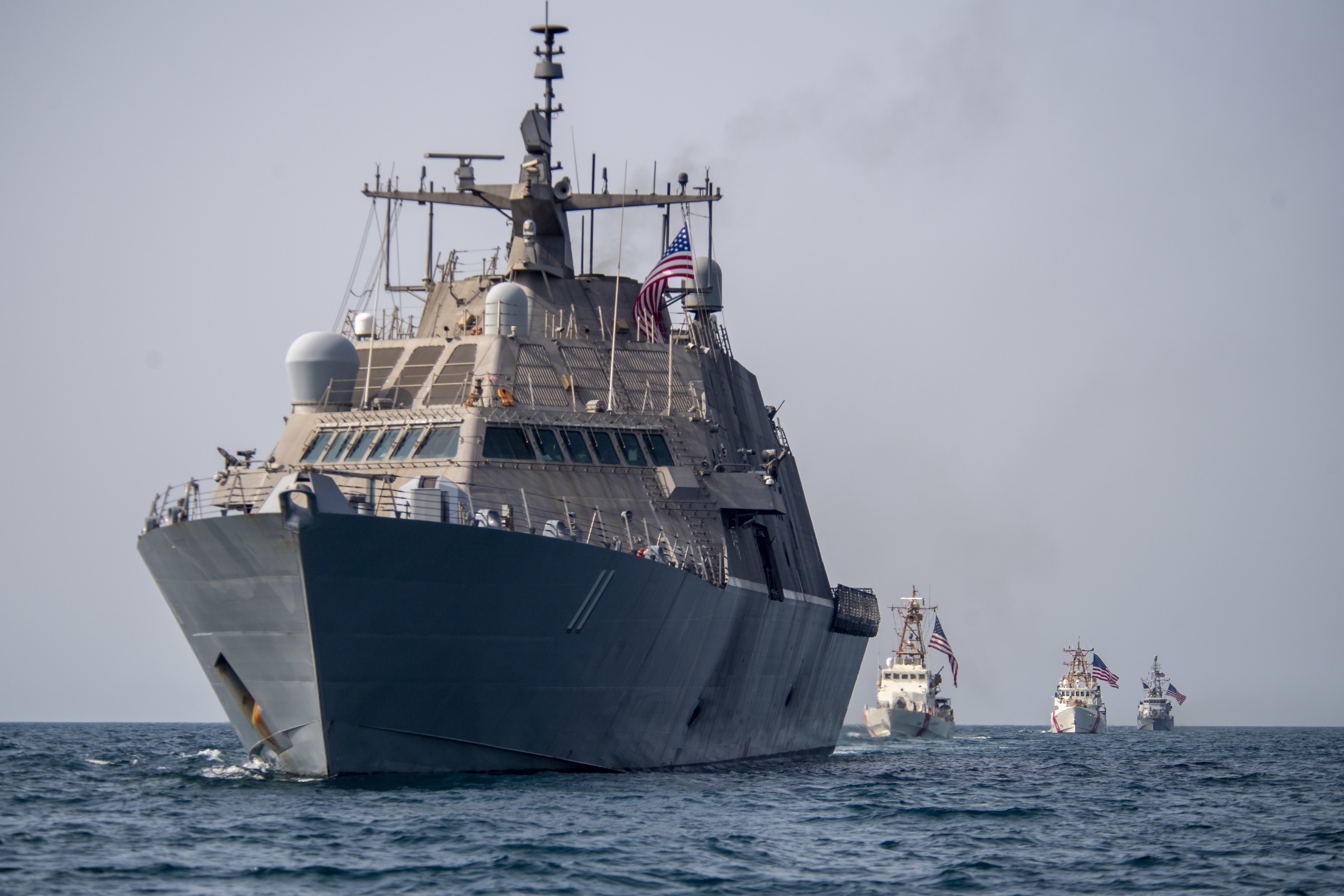
Sioux City leads a joint flotilla through the Persian Gulf, June 2022

In May 2022, Sioux City was assigned to the Sixth Fleet, while she was equipped with a surface warfare module. In late May, Sioux City was re-assigned to the Fifth Fleet and assigned to the Combined Task Force (CTF) 153 in the Red Sea.

On 2 October 2022, Sioux City arrived at her homeport of Mayport after a five-month deployment, becoming the first LCS to operate in the Baltic Sea, Mediterranean Sea, Red Sea, Gulf of Aden, Northern Arabian Sea, Gulf of Oman, and Persian Gulf.

On 14 August 2023, Sioux City was decommissioned at Naval Station Mayport with her final Commanding Officer, Commander Michael Gossett, presiding over the ceremony and placed into a Foreign Military Sale (FMS) disposition status.

== Awards ==
- Battle "E" – (2019)
