= Perot v. Federal Election Commission =

American political lawsuit in 1996

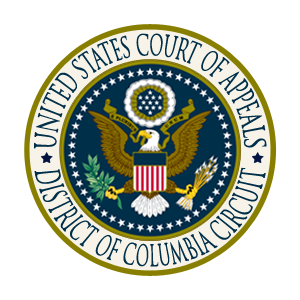
- Court: United States Court of Appeals for the District of Columbia Circuit
- Full case name: Ross Perot, Pat Choate, and Perot '96, Inc., Appellants, v. Federal Election Commission, and the Commission on Presidential Debates, Appellees.
- Argued: October 3 1996
- Decided: October 4 1996
- Citation: 553 F.3d

Court membership
- Judges sitting: Circuit Judges Laurence Silberman, A. Raymond Randolph, Judith W. Rogers

Case opinions
- Per curiam

Perot v. Federal Election Commission, 553 F.3d 97 (D.C. Cir. 1996), is a case in the U.S. Court of Appeals for the District of Columbia filed by U.S. presidential candidate and businessman Ross Perot and his running mate Pat Choate, in response to the Commission on Presidential Debates changing its rules for the 1996 United States presidential election debates to not include Perot. Paul Kirk, the co-chairman of the commission, stated that "Our decision, was made on the basis that only President Clinton and Senator Dole have a realistic chance, as set forth in our criteria, to be elected the next president of the United States." The court rejected an argument that the Federal Election Commission (FEC) violated the Constitution by delegating authority to a private entity, the Commission on Presidential Debates (CPD).
