= Russ Pennell =

American basketball coach (born 1960)

Current position
- Title: Head coach
- Team: Vilonia HS

Biographical details
- Born: November 28, 1960 (age 65); Pittsburg, Kansas, U.S.

Playing career
- 1979–1980: Arkansas
- 1981–1984: Central Arkansas
- 1984–1988: Spirit Express
- Position: Point guard

Coaching career (HC unless noted)
- 1989–1990: Pittsburg State (volunteer asst.)
- 1990–1992: Oklahoma State (assistant)
- 1992–1998: Ole Miss (assistant)
- 1998–2004: Arizona State (assistant)
- 2008–2009: Arizona (interim HC)
- 2009–2013: Grand Canyon
- 2013: Phoenix Mercury (interim HC)
- 2014–2020: Central Arkansas
- 2022–2024: Rice (assistant)
- 2024–present: Vilonia HS

Head coaching record
- Overall: 143–174 (college); 9–4 (WNBA)
- Tournaments: 2–1 (NCAA Division I); 0–2 (NCAA Division II); 1–1 (CBI)

Russell Edwin Pennell (born November 28, 1960) is an American basketball coach, who was last the head coach for the University of Central Arkansas.

Pennell was born in Pittsburg, Kansas and graduated from Pittsburg High School. He played college basketball at the University of Arkansas and at the University of Central Arkansas, where he was two-year starter at point guard. Pennell later received his bachelor's and master's degrees from Pittsburg State University.

== Coaching career ==
=== Assistant coach ===
He has been an assistant coach at Pittsburg State, Oklahoma State, University of Mississippi, and Arizona State. Pennell coached at Arizona State from 1998 to 2004. He then ran the Arizona Premier AAU summer league program for two seasons. During the 2007–08 season, he was a color analyst for men's basketball on the Arizona State radio network.

=== Head coach ===
On May 5, 2008, Arizona head coach Lute Olson announced the hiring of Pennell as an assistant coach. Pennell became the interim head coach on October 24, when Olson announced his surprise retirement for medical reasons. As interim coach, Pennell has coached the Wildcats to a 19–13 record in the regular season (9–9 conference). Because of Arizona's mid-season success, Pennell had been rumored as a contender for the Pac-10's Coach of the Year. Ultimately, Pennell did not win the award as Arizona slumped at the end of the regular season, but his work as Arizona's coach was enough to get Arizona into the NCAA tournament for the 25th consecutive year. Arizona advanced past the first round, where, as a 12th seed, they upset 5th seed Utah (Arizona's first first round win since 2006) and defeated 13th seed Cleveland State to move on to the Sweet 16 for the first time since 2005. However, Arizona suffered a crushing defeat against overall #1 seed Louisville, losing 103–64. On April 7, Arizona signed Xavier men's basketball coach Sean Miller to a 5-year, $11-million contract, ending Pennell's tenure with the Wildcats.

On April 9, 2009, Pennell was hired as head coach of the men's basketball team at Division II Grand Canyon University, a member of the Pacific West Conference. On March 15, 2013, he resigned, replaced by Dan Majerle.

On August 8, 2013, the Phoenix Mercury announced the hiring of Pennell as interim head coach following the firing of Corey Gaines. Pennell guided the team to the Western Conference finals. He announced after the season that he would not return as coach in 2014, and that he hoped to return to coaching in the college ranks.

On March 5, 2014, news broke that Pennell was expected to be named the next head coach of men's basketball at Central Arkansas. On January 7, 2020 it was announced that Pennell would step down from his position. This move followed a leave of absence for personal reasons he took in December 2019.

== Personal life ==
Pennell is married and has two children.

== Head coaching record ==
=== College ===
Record table
Season	Team	Overall	Conference	Standing	Postseason
Arizona Wildcats (Pac-10 Conference) (2008–2009)
2008–09	Arizona	21–14	9–9	T–5th	NCAA Division I Sweet 16
Arizona:		21–14 (.600)	9–9 (.500)		
Grand Canyon Antelopes (Pacific West Conference) (2009–2013)
2009–10	Grand Canyon	16–16	10–6	4th	
2010–11	Grand Canyon	14–12	9–7	4th	
2011–12	Grand Canyon	19–8	13–5	3rd	NCAA Division II Round of 64
2012–13	Grand Canyon	23–8	14–4	T–2nd	NCAA Division II Round of 64
Grand Canyon:		72–44 (.621)	46–22 (.676)		
Central Arkansas Bears (Southland Conference) (2014–2019)
2014–15	Central Arkansas	2–27	2–16	13th	
2015–16	Central Arkansas	7–21	6–12	T–9th	
2016–17	Central Arkansas	8–24	7–11	T–8th	
2017–18	Central Arkansas	18–17	10–8	7th	CBI Quarterfinal
2018–19	Central Arkansas	14–19	8–10	T–7th	
2019–20	Central Arkansas	1–8	0–0		
Central Arkansas:		50–116 (.301)	32–57 (.360)		
Total:		143–174 (.451)			

=== WNBA ===
Legend
Regular season	G	Games coached	W	Games won	L	Games lost	W–L %	Win–loss %
Playoffs	PG	Playoff games	PW	Playoff wins	PL	Playoff losses	PW–L %	Playoff win–loss %

Team	Year	G	W	L	W–L%	Finish	PG	PW	PL	PW–L%	Result
Phoenix	2013	13	9	4	.692	3rd in Western	5	2	3	.400	Lost Conference semifinals
Career		13	9	4	.692		5	2	3	.400	
