= Peniel College =

Christian college in Texas

Coordinates: 33.1645°N 96.1263°W

- Former names: Texas Holiness University, Peniel University
- Type: Private
- Active: 1899–1920
- Affiliations: Nazarene
- Location: Peniel, Texas, United States
- Campus: Rural

Peniel College was a Nazarene college located in Peniel, Texas. It has since closed.

== History ==
Peniel College began as Texas Holiness University, founded by B. A. Cordell and E. C. DeJernett founded in 1898. It was then established on a 37-acre campus in 1899 by A. M. Hills and a small holiness community at Holiness, later called Peniel and now part of Greenville, Texas. It was sponsored by the Holiness Association of Texas, but the association disbanded in 1910 after many of its members united with the Church of the Nazarene. The school then became one of the first three "official" Nazarene educational institutions in 1908, supported by the Dallas District Church of the Nazarene, and the name was changed to Peniel College. In 1920, the college merged with Oklahoma Nazarene College in Bethany, Oklahoma, which was then renamed "Bethany-Peniel College".

Peniel's presidents included A. M. Hills, Edgar Ellyson (1907–1911), Roy T. Williams (1911–1913), J. B. Chapman (1913–1918), and A. K. Bracken, who took the presidency at Bethany-Peniel College in 1920.

== Legacy ==
Founded in 1909, Oklahoma Holiness College, called Oklahoma Nazarene College when it absorbed Peniel College, took on the founding date of Texas Holiness University (1899).
