= Roy T. Williams =

Minister and general superintendent in the Church of Nazarene

Roy Tilman Williams (1883-1946) was a minister and general superintendent in the Church of the Nazarene.

== Biography ==
Roy Williams was born in Milam, Texas on February 14, 1883. His family moved to Many, Louisiana when he was five years old. Williams was not exposed to religion during his childhood; however, at the age of 16 he attended a revival at a Methodist church. It was then that he began practicing Methodism, and although he was originally ridiculed by his family for his decision, they eventually converted to Methodism themselves. In 1908, Williams attended the second General Assembly of the Church of the Nazarene at Pilot Point Texas with his wife Eunice Harvey Williams and was ordained a minister by Nazarene general superintendent Hiram F. Reynolds.

Among the first graduates at Texas Holiness University, Williams became the president of the university in 1911 at the age of 28. As president, he changed the name to Peniel University, and it was renamed Peniel College by a later president. Williams resigned in 1913 to become an evangelist, which he continued until 1916 when he was named the General Superintendent of the Church of the Nazarene after the deaths of the two current superintendents. At 33 years old, he was the youngest person to hold that position, and a later General Assembly set the age limit to 35. He served from 1916 until the end of his life in 1946, the longest time that anyone had ever served.

Williams was to give a speech in Columbus, Georgia on October 21, 1945; however, he woke up that morning feeling ill and unable to talk, so the pastor of the church, Rev. Joseph Bierce, took him to the hospital. When he was fit to travel again, he was taken to his cabin in Missouri. He died on March 25, 1946, days after his arrival at his cabin.

The library on the campus of Southern Nazarene University is named after him.
