= Flag of Wichita, Kansas =

City of Wichita
- Proportion: 2:3
- Adopted: June 14, 1937
- Design: A white field with three alternating rays in red expanding from an off-center blue circle, which has a Zia-like symbol in white overlaid.
- Designed by: Cecil McAlister

The city flag of Wichita, Kansas, was adopted in 1937. Designed by a local artist from South Wichita, Cecil McAlister, it represents freedom, happiness, contentment and home.

The blue sun in the center represents happiness and contentment. A symbol similar but not identical to the Zia sun symbol is stitched on the blue sun. The Wichita Regional Chamber of Commerce has claimed that it is a "Native American Hogan symbol [that] signifies 'permanent home.'" The three red and white rays that alternate from the off-center blue sun represent the path of freedom to come and go as one pleases.

Selected from more than 100 entries that were submitted for a city flag design contest, it was officially adopted on Flag Day, June 14, 1937, by Mayor T. Walker Weaver. The first Wichita flag was produced by local seamstress Mary J. Harper. It flew for the first time on July 23, 1937, over City Hall.

== History ==
The early 20th century was a difficult time for the young city of Wichita. It saw the ups and downs of the oil industry, the Great Depression, the boom of the aircraft industry and rapid growth and expansion of manufacturing jobs during World War II. The cycle of innovation and invention throughout Wichita generated numerous taglines, catchphrases, and monikers. From Cowtown to Doo Dah to the first claim of the world title: The Broomcorn Capital, left Wichita feeling outdated and out of touch with larger cities.

With the varied aircraft industry and test center for aviation moving into town, Wichita was soon dubbed the "Air Capital of the World." However, after the Depression and the Dust Bowl sweeping through the city, city leaders determined that Wichita needed more than a slogan, but something visual - a flag.

== The contest ==
In 1937, the forefathers of Wichita generated the idea to hold a contest for local Wichitans to design a flag. A panel of artists was gathered to judge the submitted designs and a variety of winnings were offered. Over 100 submissions were received and the panel of judges went to work determining the next identity associated with Wichita. Cecil McAlister was selected as the winner and was awarded a grand prize of $40 ($895.80 in 2025).

On June 14, 1937, Mayor T. Walker Weaver announced the winning design and adopted it as the official flag of Wichita. Seamstress Mary J. Harper was selected to stitch together the complicated new flag design. She took one day to complete the first Wichita flag and ended up sewing six in total for the city.

The first flag was raised at the City Hall flag pole on July 23, 1937.

== Resurgence ==
The flag has been an official symbol of Wichita since 1937, but until recently very few Wichitans were familiar with it or even knew what it was. Throughout the past few years, Wichitans have been voicing their pride for their city. The Wichita flag is now being flown at a number of places: businesses, schools, and neighborhoods.

- A 2004 survey by the North American Vexillological Association ranked the Wichita flag as the 6th best design out of 150 cities.
- Flag elements were incorporated in the Naval crest for the newly commissioned USS Wichita.
- The digital audience embracing the flag on the primary social media tools Instagram, Twitter and Facebook continues to grow without paid promotion or purchase of followers.
- VIP Wichita, (a monthly magazine publication) includes a Wichita flag feature spread, as well as testimonials from local business leaders saying why "#ILoveWichita."
- Local Wichita Artists are incorporating the flag into their personal artwork, including murals that have been painted on buildings.
- Images of the Wichita flag (or flag items) have been shared from multiple states, countries, and continents.
- Local retail stores and organizations now carry Wichita flag merchandise ranging from socks to skateboards.
- Elements of the Wichita flag are now being included in numerous logos of Wichita-based businesses, events, and organizations.
