= Vilonia School District =

School district in Arkansas, United States

Location
- 1164 Main Street; Vilonia, AR 72173 United States
- Coordinates: 35.08546°N 92.19442°W

District information
- Grades: PK–12
- Superintendent: David Stephens (since 2014)
- Schools: 7 (2019–2020 School Year)
- NCES District ID: 0513530

Students and staff
- Students: 3,146
- Student–teacher ratio: 15.86
- Athletic conference: 5A
- District mascot: Eagle

Other information
- Website: www.viloniaschools.org

Vilonia School District is a public school district based in Vilonia, Arkansas. It was originally established as Oak Grove School District. The district encompasses 109.33 square miles (283.2 km^{2}) of land in Faulkner County and serves the all or portions of the communities of Vilonia, Conway, Cabot, and Mount Vernon.

== Schools ==
- Vilonia High School (current configuration 1970s–present), serving grades 10 through 12
- Vilonia Freshman Academy, served grade 9 until the 2025–2026 school year
- Vilonia Junior High School, formerly Vilonia Middle School, serving grades 7 through 9
- Frank Mitchell Intermediate School (current configuration 2015–present), new school serving grades 4 through 6
- Vilonia Elementary School (current configuration 2015–present), serving kindergarten through grade 3 (1980s–2006)
- Vilonia Primary School (current configuration 2015–present), serving kindergarten through grade 3
- Vilonia Early Childhood Learning Center, serving pre-kindergarten
