= Vilonia, Arkansas =

- City
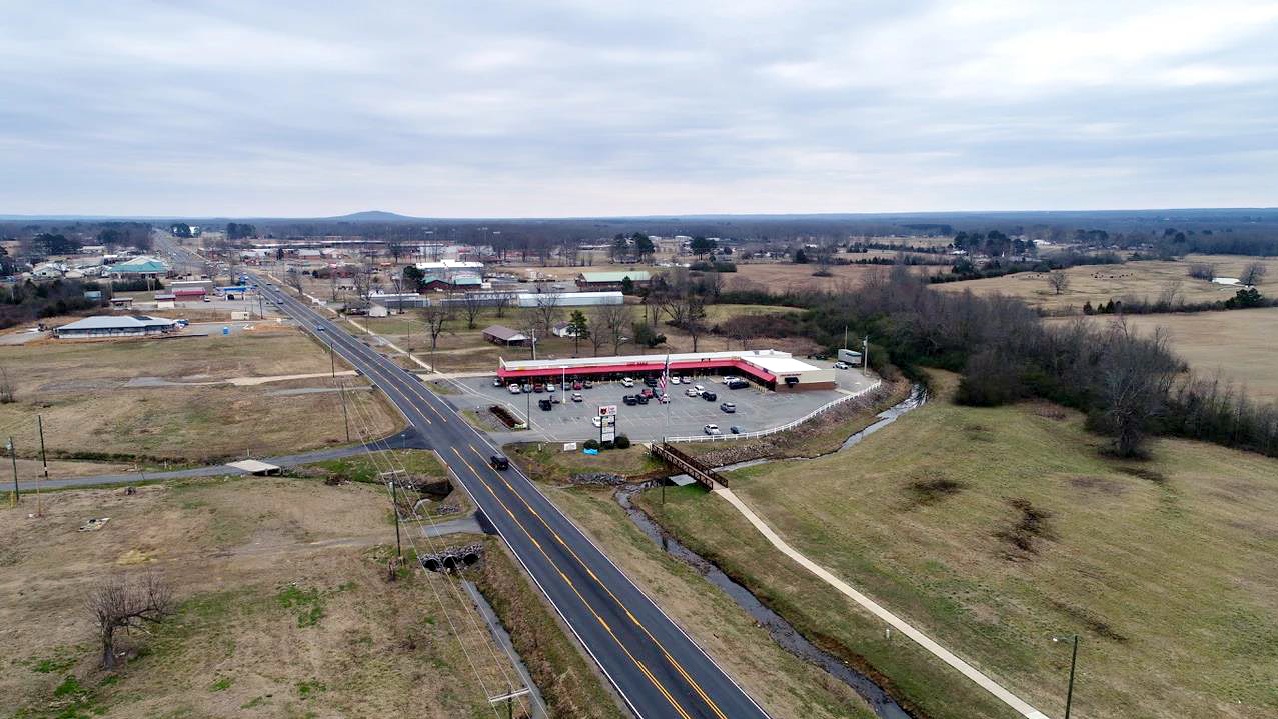
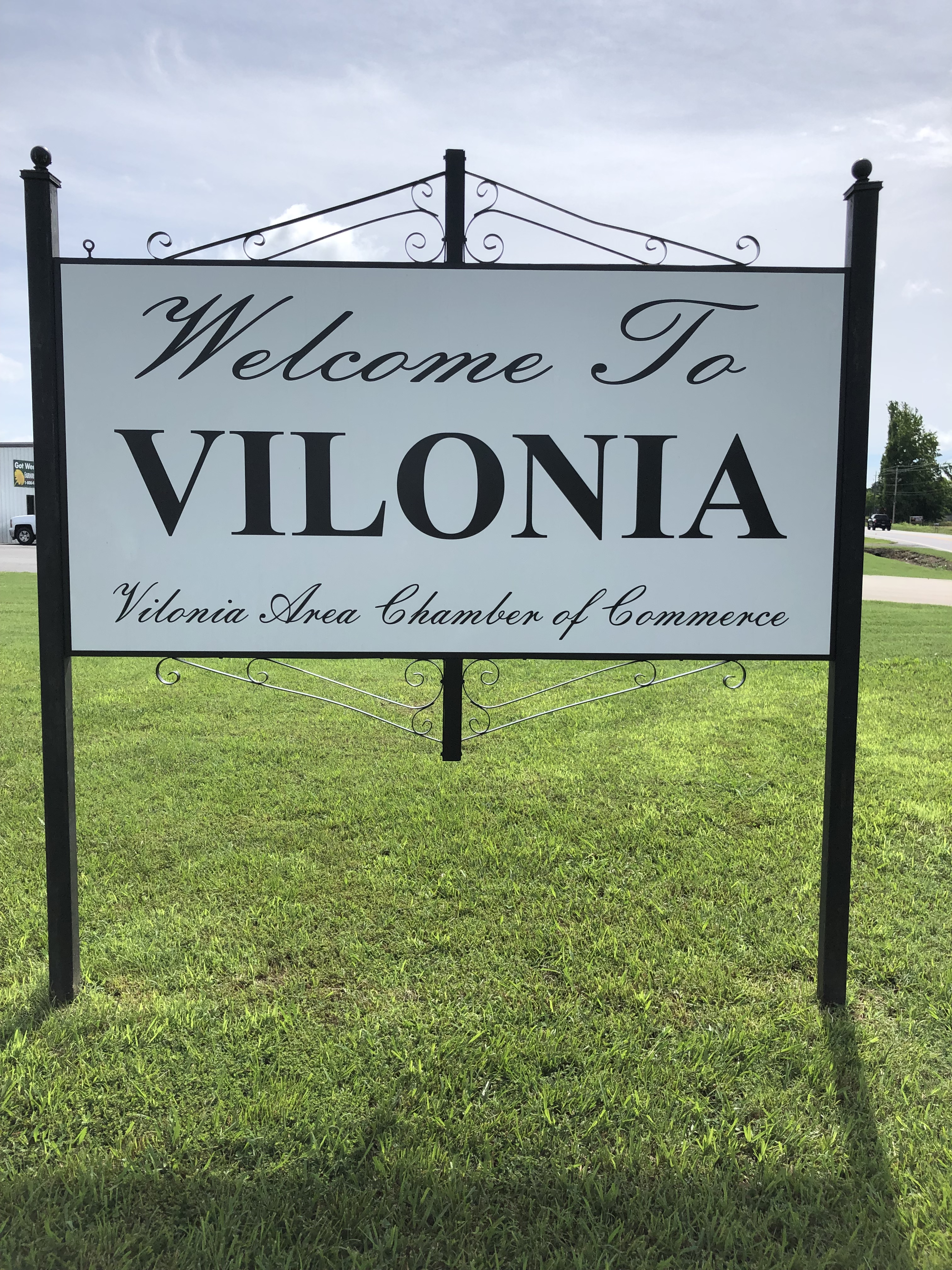
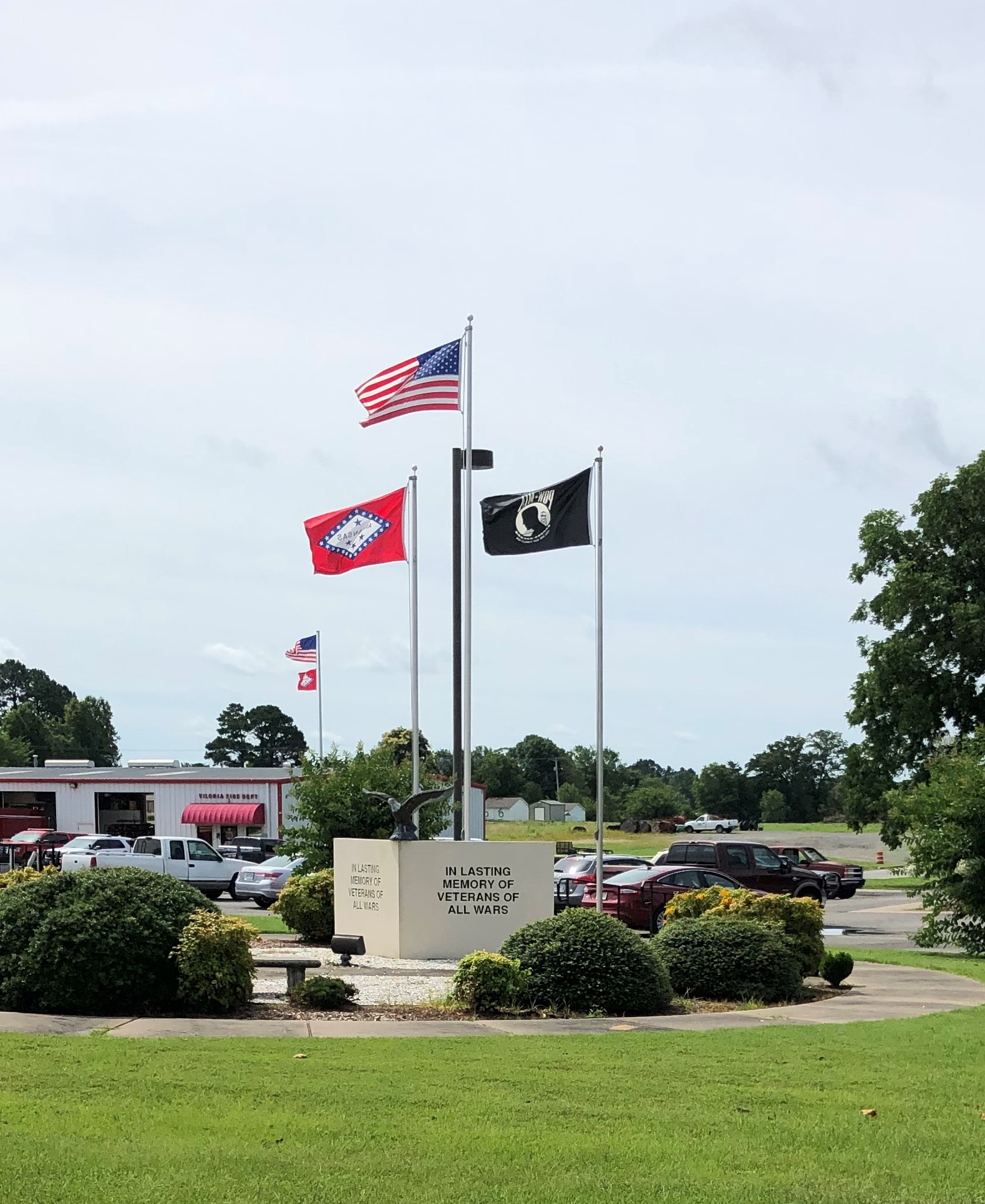
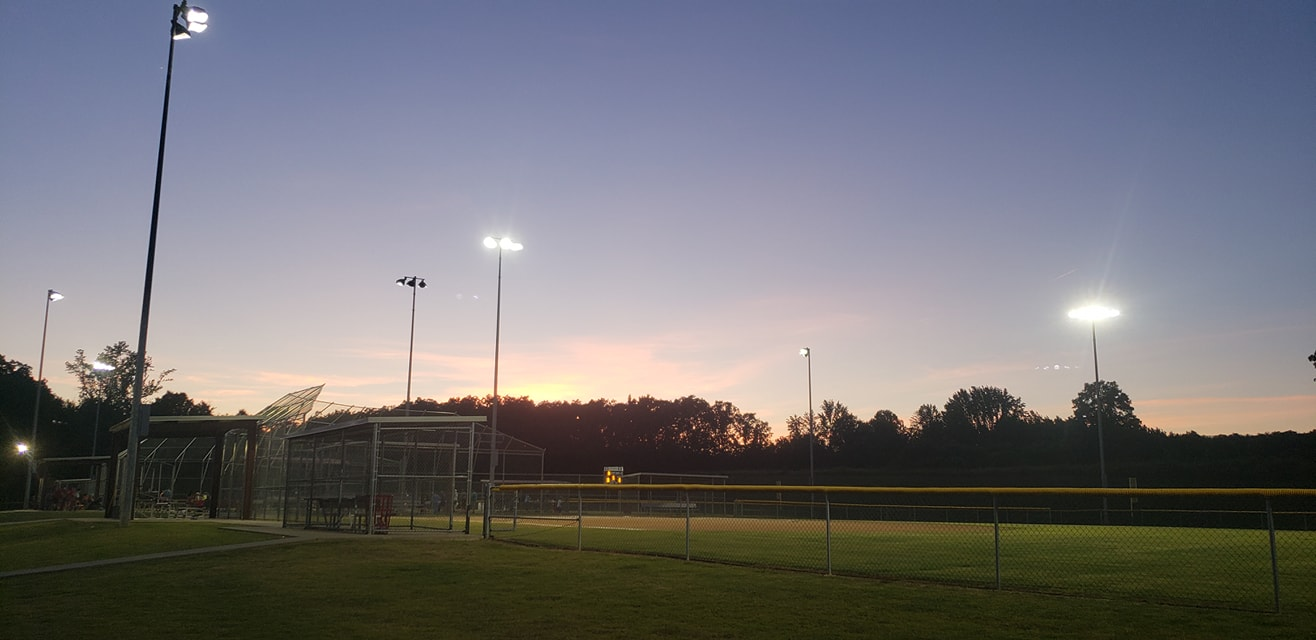
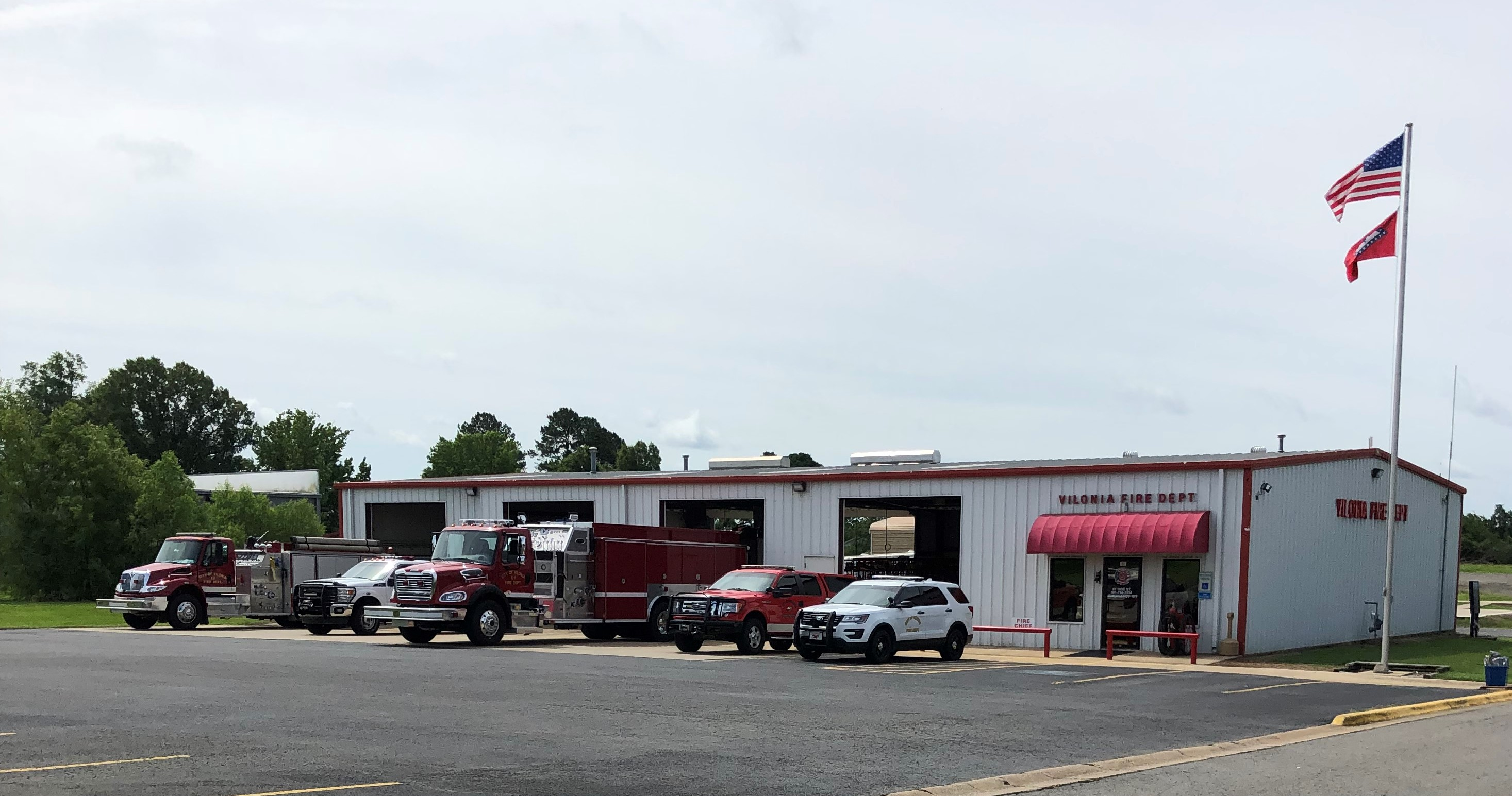
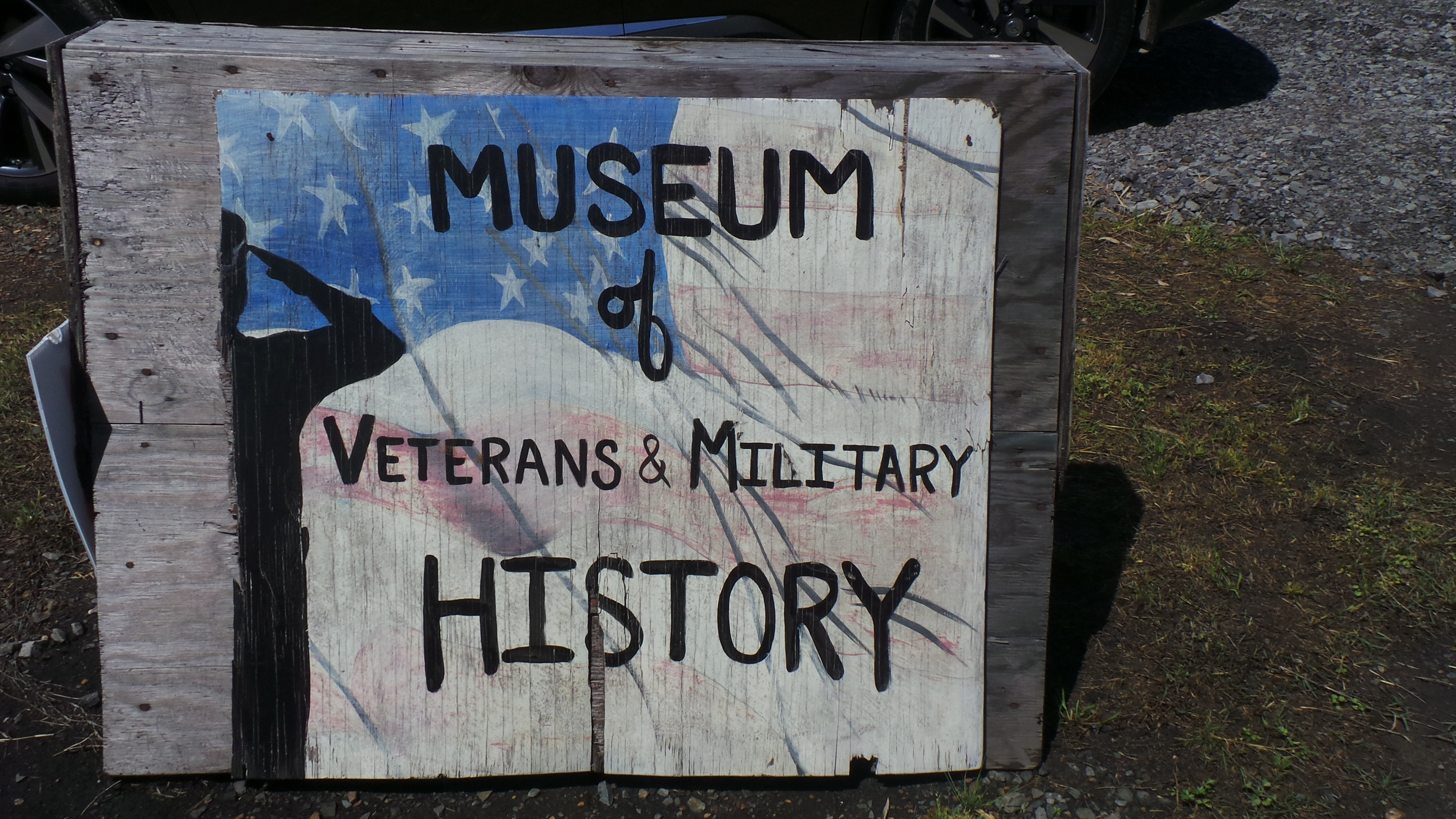
- Drone Flyover, Welcome Sign, Veterans Memorial, Baseball Fields, Fire Department, Veterans Museum

- Location of Vilonia in Faulkner County, Arkansas.
- Coordinates: 35°4′38″N 92°12′45″W
- Country: United States
- State: Arkansas
- County: Faulkner
- Incorporated: 1938

Government
  - Mayor: Preston Scroggins

Area
  - City: 7.98 sq mi (20.66 km^{2})
  - Land: 7.97 sq mi (20.65 km^{2})
  - Water: 0.0039 sq mi (0.01 km^{2})
- Elevation: 312 ft (95 m)

Population (2020)
  - City: 4,288
  - Estimate (2025): 4,894 ▲
  - Density: 537.8/sq mi (207.66/km^{2})
  - Metro: 748,031
- Time zone: UTC-6 (Central (CST))
  - Summer (DST): UTC-5 (CDT)
- ZIP code: 72173
- Area code: 501
- FIPS code: 05-71960
- GNIS feature ID: 2405655
- Website: www.cityofvilonia.net

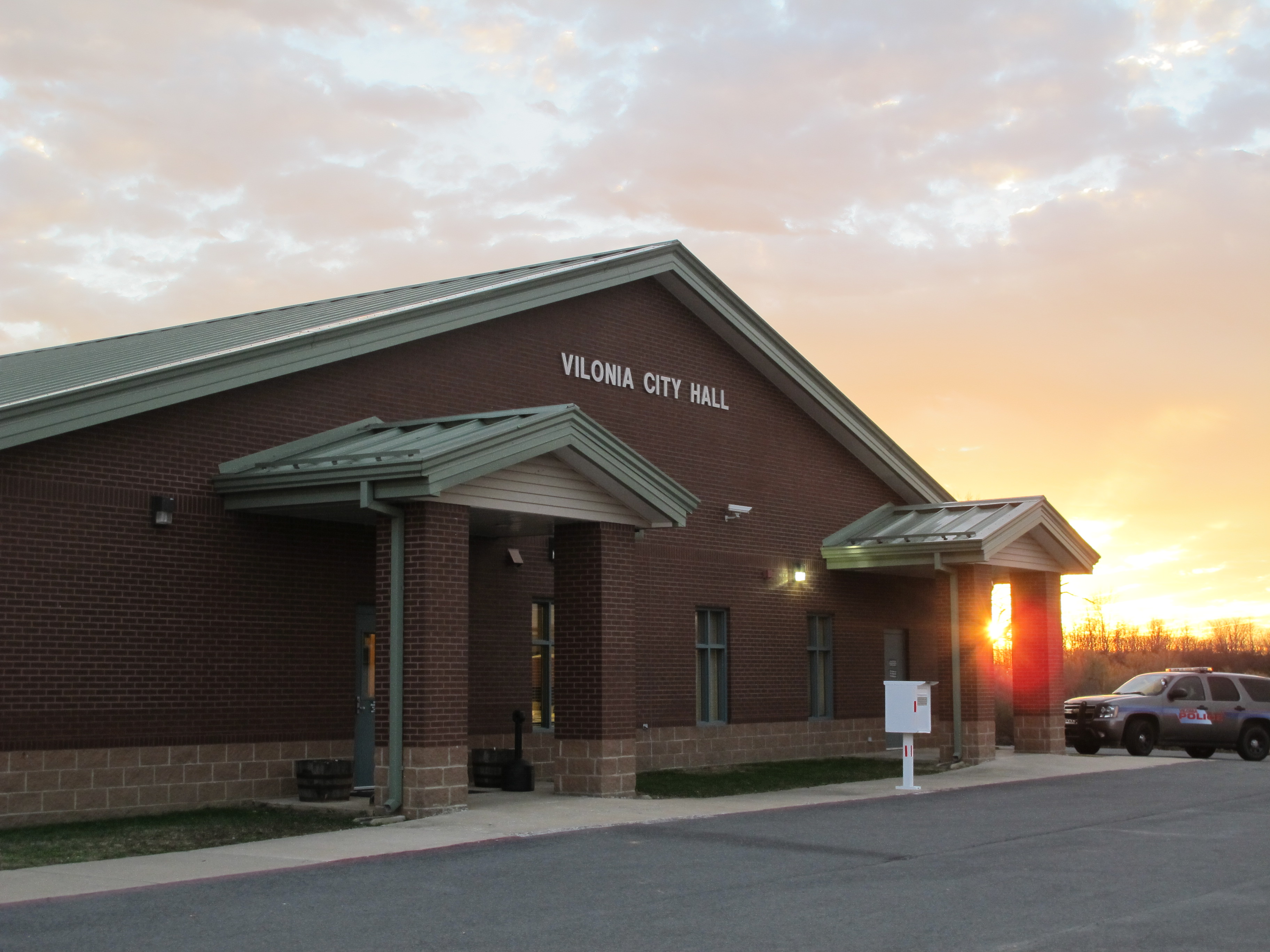
Vilonia City Hall

Vilonia is a city in Faulkner County, Arkansas, United States. Its population was 4,288 in 2020 and estimated at 4,429 in 2021, up from 3,815 at the 2010 census and 2,106 at the 2000 census. It is part of the Central Arkansas region.

== History ==
When Vilonia was originally settled in the 1860s, it was listed as Cypress Township, but settlers quickly named it Vilsonia, or "land of two valleys". When the local Masons applied for national affiliation, a transcription error removed the 's', leaving the town, officially, Vilonia. It was incorporated on August 23, 1938, under the leadership of Mayor Thomas Henry Hill.

== Tornadoes ==
Vilonia has suffered devastating impacts from two tornadoes in its history, once in 2011 and again in 2014.

=== 2011 tornado ===
A small portion of the town was destroyed by a tornado on the evening of April 25, 2011. The devastated area was a mobile home park. The tornado was confirmed and rated high-end EF2 by National Weather Service survey crews. Four people were killed in the Vilonia area.

=== 2014 tornado ===
On April 27, 2014, in the late evening hours, a violent EF4 tornado passed through Mayflower and continued into Vilonia shortly before 7:50 p.m. (0050 UTC). 16 people were killed, several homes in one subdivision were swept clean off their foundations, a 15-ton fertilizer tank was thrown ¾ of a mile and several businesses were damaged or destroyed, including the new Vilonia Intermediate School, which had been set to open in the fall. The NWS office in Little Rock said that if it had occurred before the Enhanced Fujita scale was implemented in 2007, it would more than likely have been rated F5. There was consideration for upgrading the tornado to EF5 status, but due to the low quality of construction, the EF4 rating stands.

On May 7, 2014, President Barack Obama visited the city to view the damage and reconstruction efforts. With him were Governor Mike Beebe (D), Senator Mark Pryor (D) and Representative Tim Griffin (R).

== Geography ==
Vilonia is located in southeastern Faulkner County at 35°4′38″N 92°12′45″W (35.077299, −92.212617). It is bypassed to the south by US 64 which leads west 13 miles (21 km) to Conway, the county seat, and east 21 miles (34 km) to Beebe.

According to the United States Census Bureau, Vilonia has a total area of 7.1 square miles (18.4 km^{2}), of which 0.004 square miles (0.01 km^{2}), or 0.05%, is water.

== Demographics ==
Historical population
Census	Pop.	Note	%±
1940	259		—
1950	215		−17.0%
1960	234		8.8%
1970	423		80.8%
1980	736		74.0%
1990	1,133		53.9%
2000	2,106		85.9%
2010	3,815		81.1%
2020	4,288		12.4%
2025 (est.)	4,894	▲	14.1%
U.S. Decennial Census

=== 2020 census ===
As of the 2020 census, Vilonia had a population of 4,288, with 1,432 households and 1,211 families residing in the city. The median age was 33.5 years. 31.7% of residents were under the age of 18 and 10.7% were 65 years of age or older. For every 100 females there were 96.4 males, and for every 100 females age 18 and over there were 89.5 males age 18 and over.

0.0% of residents lived in urban areas, while 100.0% lived in rural areas.

Of households in Vilonia, 49.1% had children under the age of 18 living in them. 63.0% were married-couple households, 10.6% were households with a male householder and no spouse or partner present, and 21.1% were households with a female householder and no spouse or partner present. About 15.1% of all households were made up of individuals and 6.5% had someone living alone who was 65 years of age or older.

There were 1,521 housing units, of which 4.9% were vacant. The homeowner vacancy rate was 2.0% and the rental vacancy rate was 6.7%.

Vilonia racial composition
Race	Number	Percentage
White (non-Hispanic)	3,694	86.15%
Black or African American (non-Hispanic)	53	1.24%
Native American	32	0.75%
Asian	25	0.58%
Pacific Islander	2	0.05%
Other/Mixed	299	6.97%
Hispanic or Latino	183	4.27%

=== 2000 census ===
At the 2000 census, there were 2,106 people, 726 households and 612 families residing in the town. The population density was 327.6 per square mile (126.5/km^{2}). There were 785 housing units at an average density of 122.1 per square mile (47.1/km^{2}). The racial make-up was 98.39% White, 0.14% Black or African American, 0.52% Native American, 0.19% Asian, 0.19% from other races and 0.57% from two or more races. 1.28% of the population were Hispanic or Latino of any race.

There were 726 households, of which 51.9% had children under the age of 18 living with them, 69.7% were married couples living together, 10.9% had a female householder with no husband present and 15.7% were non-families. 13.5% of all households were made up of individuals and 4.1% had someone living alone who was 65 years of age or older. The average household size was 2.90 and the average family size was 3.16.

33.0% of the population were under the age of 18, 7.2% from 18 to 24, 35.4% from 25 to 44, 16.6% from 45 to 64 and 7.9% were 65 years of age or older. The median age was 32 years. For every 100 females, there were 97.7 males. For every 100 females age 18 and over, there were 96.4 males.

The median household income was $45,147 and the median family income was $50,184. Males had a median income of $33,684 and females $26,563. The per capita income was $17,495. About 6.1% of families and 7.6% of the population were below the poverty line, including 9.0% of those under age 18 and 11.9% of those age 65 or over.

== Education ==
Public education of early childhood, elementary and secondary school students is primarily provided by the Vilonia School District, which leads to graduation from Vilonia High School.

Nearby secondary educational institutions include the Arkansas State University-Beebe, Central Baptist College, Hendrix College, and University of Central Arkansas in Conway.

== Notable people ==
- J. B. Chapman (1884–1947), president of Arkansas Holiness College, Nazarene General Superintendent
