= Arkansas Holiness College =

- Type: Private
- Active: 1900–1931
- Affiliations: Nazarene
- Location: Vilonia, Arkansas, United States
- Campus: Rural

Arkansas Holiness College was an educational institution located in Vilonia, Arkansas. It was closed in 1931 after merging with another institution.

== History ==
A school for children was founded 1900 by Fannie Suddarth. It was thought to have a Free Methodist affiliation but became a part of the Eastern Council of the Holiness Church of Christ in 1906. After the Holiness Church of Christ merged with the Pentecostal Church of the Nazarene, the school functioned under the Arkansas District Church of the Nazarene, and was accepted as an official Nazarene school in 1914. Arkansas Holiness College merged with Bethany-Peniel College in 1931.
