= Yale, Illinois =

- Village
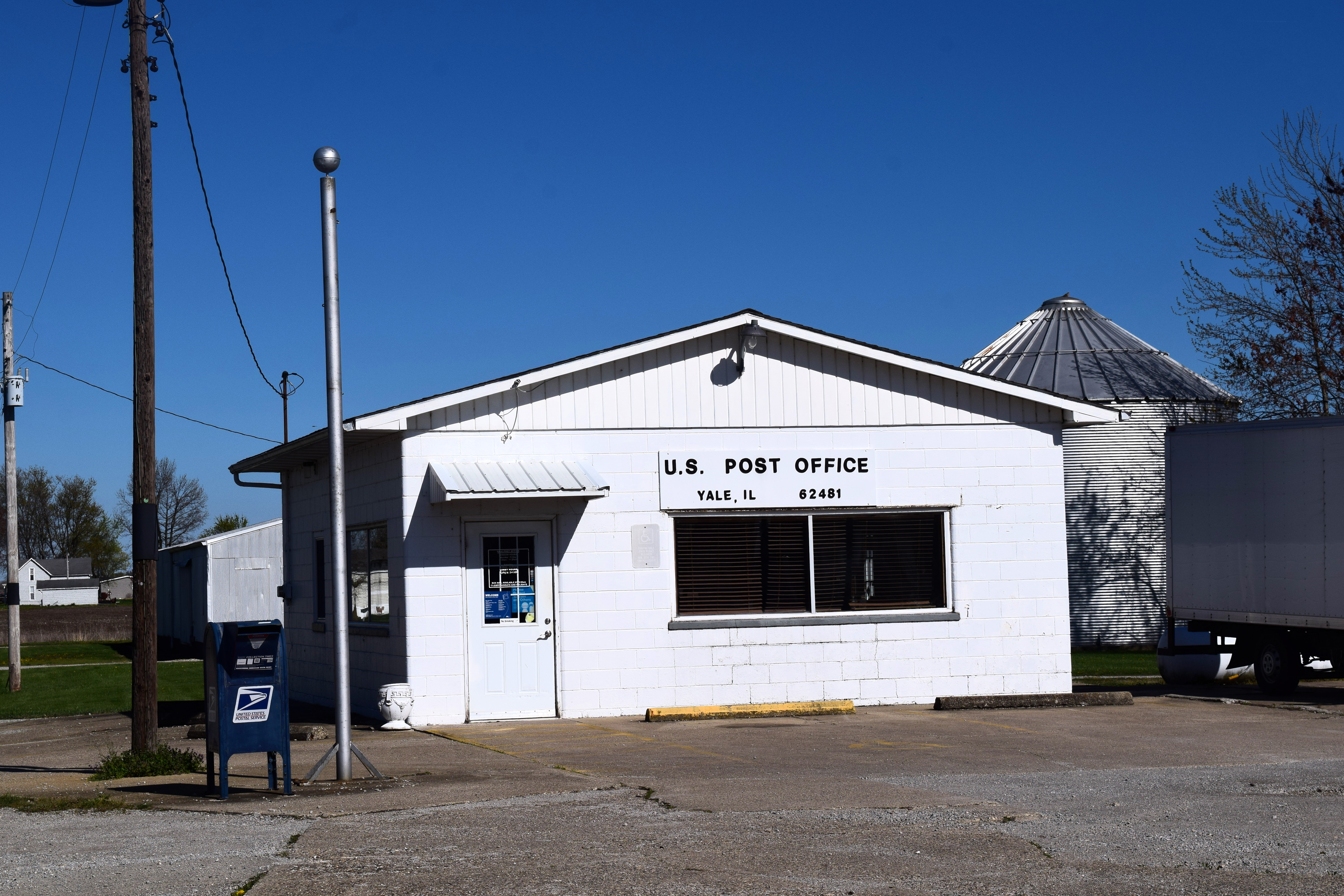
- Yale post office

- Location of Yale in Jasper County, Illinois
- Coordinates: 39°07′13″N 88°01′28″W
- Country: United States
- State: Illinois
- County: Jasper

Area
  - Total: 0.58 sq mi (1.49 km^{2})
  - Land: 0.58 sq mi (1.49 km^{2})
  - Water: 0 sq mi (0.00 km^{2})
- Elevation: 558 ft (170 m)

Population (2020)
  - Total: 67
  - Density: 116.5/sq mi (44.98/km^{2})
- Time zone: UTC-6 (CST)
  - Summer (DST): UTC-5 (CDT)
- ZIP code: 62481
- Area code: 618
- FIPS code: 17–83765
- GNIS feature ID: 2399749

Yale is a village in Jasper County, Illinois, United States. The population was 67 at the 2020 census.

== History ==
The town was laid out in 1845–1847 by settler Thomas Tennery, who served as postmaster from 1852–1855. It was originally named Grandville as the namesake of its township, but adopted the name Yale from the name of the post office.

== Geography ==
Yale is located in northeastern Jasper County. Illinois Route 49 passes through the village, leading north 14 miles (23 km) to Casey and south 7 miles (11 km) to its terminus at Illinois Route 33 near Willow Hill. Newton, the Jasper county seat, is 16 miles (26 km) southwest of Yale.

According to the 2021 census gazetteer files, Yale has a total area of 0.58 square miles (1.50 km^{2}), all land.

== Demographics ==
Historical population
Census	Pop.	Note	%±
1930	157		—
1940	176		12.1%
1950	153		−13.1%
1960	123		−19.6%
1970	108		−12.2%
1980	129		19.4%
1990	94		−27.1%
2000	97		3.2%
2010	86		−11.3%
2020	67		−22.1%
U.S. Decennial Census

As of the 2020 census there were 67 people, 50 households, and 44 families residing in the village. The population density was 116.52 inhabitants per square mile (44.99/km^{2}). There were 37 housing units at an average density of 64.35 per square mile (24.85/km^{2}). The racial makeup of the village was 85.07% White, 0.00% African American, 5.97% Native American, 0.00% Asian, 0.00% Pacific Islander, 0.00% from other races, and 8.96% from two or more races. Hispanic or Latino of any race were 0.00% of the population.

There were 50 households, out of which 30.0% had children under the age of 18 living with them, 82.00% were married couples living together, 6.00% had a female householder with no husband present, and 12.00% were non-families. 8.00% of all households were made up of individuals, and 0.00% had someone living alone who was 65 years of age or older. The average household size was 2.75 and the average family size was 2.58.

The village's age distribution consisted of 22.5% under the age of 18, 4.7% from 18 to 24, 31.1% from 25 to 44, 17.9% from 45 to 64, and 24.0% who were 65 years of age or older. The median age was 41.5 years. For every 100 females, there were 81.7 males. For every 100 females age 18 and over, there were 92.3 males.

The median income for a household in the village was $40,208, and the median income for a family was $40,833. Males had a median income of $48,750 versus $33,068 for females. The per capita income for the village was $17,747. About 13.6% of families and 13.2% of the population were below the poverty line, including 0.0% of those under age 18 and 19.4% of those age 65 or over.
