= Jim Lehrer =

American journalist and writer (1934–2020)

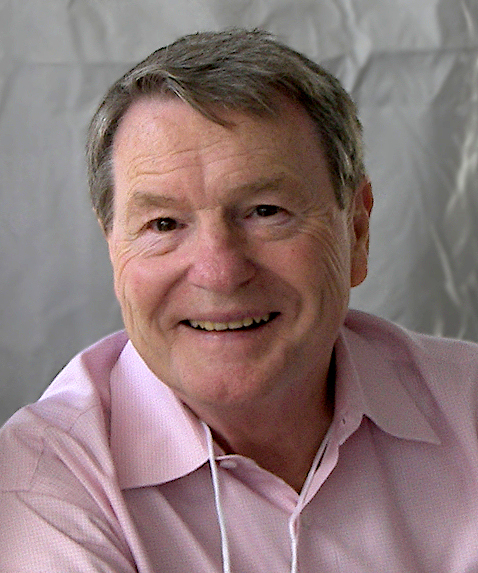
- Lehrer at the 2007 Texas Book Festival
- Born: James Charles Lehrer; May 19, 1934; Wichita, Kansas, U.S.
- Died: January 23, 2020 (aged 85); Washington, D.C., U.S.
- Education: University of Missouri (BA)
- Occupations: Journalist; news anchor; author
- Years active: 1959–2012
- Notable credits: PBS News Hour; The Dallas Morning News; Dallas Times Herald
- Spouse: Kate Staples (m. 1960)
- Children: 3
- Relatives: J. B. Chapman (grandfather)

James Charles Lehrer (/ˈlɛərə/ LAIR-ə; May 19, 1934 – January 23, 2020) was an American journalist, novelist, screenwriter, and playwright. He was the executive editor and a news anchor for the PBS News Hour on PBS and was known for his role as a debate moderator during U.S. presidential election campaigns, moderating 12 presidential debates between 1988 and 2012. Lehrer also wrote numerous fiction and non-fiction books that drew upon his experience as a newsman, along with his interests in history and politics.

== Early life and education ==
Lehrer was born on May 19, 1934, in Wichita, Kansas. His mother, Lois Catherine Lehrer (née Chapman), was a teacher and bank clerk, and his father, Harry Frederick Lehrer, was a bus station manager. Lehrer's paternal grandparents were German immigrants. His maternal grandfather was J. B. Chapman, a prominent Church of the Nazarene figure. Lehrer had an older brother, Fred, who was a Baptist minister. He attended school in Wichita, middle school in Beaumont, Texas, and graduated from Thomas Jefferson High School in San Antonio, where he was a sports editor for the Jefferson Declaration. Lehrer graduated with an associate degree from Victoria College, and a bachelor's degree in journalism from the Missouri School of Journalism at the University of Missouri in 1956.

After graduating from college, Lehrer followed in his father and older brother's footsteps by joining the United States Marine Corps, serving for three years as an infantry officer in the late 1950s. Lehrer attributed his service and travels with helping him to look beyond himself and feel a connection to the world that he would not have otherwise experienced.

== Career ==
In 1959, Lehrer began his career in journalism at The Dallas Morning News in Texas. Later, Lehrer worked as a reporter for the Dallas Times Herald, where he covered the assassination of John F. Kennedy in 1963. Lehrer was a political columnist there for several years, and he became the city editor in 1968.

Lehrer began his television career at KERA-TV in Dallas, Texas, as the executive director of Public Affairs, an on-air host, and editor of a nightly news program. In 1972, Lehrer moved to PBS in Washington, D.C., to become the Public Affairs Coordinator, a member of Journalism Advisory Board, and a Fellow at the Corporation for Public Broadcasting (CPB). He worked as a correspondent for the National Public Affairs Center for Television (NPACT), where he met Robert MacNeil. In 1973, they covered the Senate Watergate hearings and the revelation of the Watergate Tapes broadcast, live on PBS (This coverage of the hearings would later help lead to and be the inspiration for what would eventually become The MacNeil/Lehrer Report). Lehrer covered the House Judiciary Committee's impeachment inquiry of President Richard Nixon.

In October 1975, Lehrer became the Washington correspondent for The Robert MacNeil Report on Thirteen/WNET New York. Two months later on December 1, 1975, he was promoted to co-anchor, and the program was accordingly renamed The MacNeil/Lehrer Report. In September 1983, Lehrer and MacNeil relaunched their show as The MacNeil/Lehrer NewsHour, which was renamed The NewsHour with Jim Lehrer, following MacNeil's departure in 1995. The program was renamed the PBS NewsHour in 2009.

In order to maintain objectivity, Lehrer chose not to vote.

Lehrer underwent a heart valve surgery in April 2008, allowing Ray Suarez, Gwen Ifill, and Judy Woodruff to anchor in his stead until Lehrer's return on June 26, 2008. He had recovered from a minor heart attack in 1983 at age 49.

Lehrer stepped down as anchor of the PBS NewsHour on June 6, 2011, but continued to moderate the Friday news analysis segments and be involved with the show's production company, MacNeil/Lehrer Productions.

Lehrer received several awards and honors during his career in journalism, including several Emmys; the George Foster Peabody Broadcast Award; a William Allen White Foundation Award for Journalistic Merit; and the University of Missouri School of Journalism's Medal of Honor. In 2004, Lehrer was awarded an honorary Doctor of Journalism degree by McDaniel College.

== Presidential debate moderator ==
Lehrer was involved in several projects related to U.S. presidential debates, including the Debating Our Destiny documentaries in 2000 and 2008, which feature excerpts of exclusive interviews with many of the presidential and vice-presidential candidates since 1976. Nicknamed "The Dean of Moderators" by journalist Bernard Shaw, Lehrer moderated 12 presidential debates between 1988 and 2012. In 2016, Lehrer served on the board of the Commission on Presidential Debates (CPD).

The last debate that Lehrer moderated was the first general election debate of the 2012 election. He had originally sworn off moderating any debates after 2008, but the CPD persisted, and Lehrer accepted, as he was interested in the new format. The debate was held at the University of Denver and covered domestic policy issues. Lehrer's performance as a moderator, in which he frequently allowed the candidates to exceed the given time limits, received mixed reviews; while Lehrer received criticism for his lenient enforcement of time rules and open-ended questions, Lehrer's approach also received praise for letting the candidates have some control in the debate on their own terms.

Debates Moderated by Jim Lehrer
Date	Debate Type	Democratic Candidate	Republican Candidate	Independent Candidate
Sunday, September 25, 1988	Presidential	Michael Dukakis	George H. W. Bush	—
Sunday, October 11, 1992	Presidential	Bill Clinton	George H. W. Bush	Ross Perot
Monday, October 19, 1992	Presidential	Bill Clinton	George H. W. Bush	Ross Perot
Sunday, October 6, 1996	Presidential	Bill Clinton	Bob Dole	—
Wednesday, October 16, 1996	Presidential	Bill Clinton	Bob Dole	—
Wednesday, October 9, 1996	Vice Presidential	Al Gore	Jack Kemp	—
Tuesday, October 3, 2000	Presidential	Al Gore	George W. Bush	—
Wednesday, October 11, 2000	Presidential	Al Gore	George W. Bush	—
Tuesday, October 17, 2000	Presidential	Al Gore	George W. Bush	—
Thursday, September 30, 2004	Presidential	John Kerry	George W. Bush	—
Friday, September 26, 2008	Presidential	Barack Obama	John McCain	—
Wednesday, October 3, 2012	Presidential	Barack Obama	Mitt Romney	—

== Personal life ==
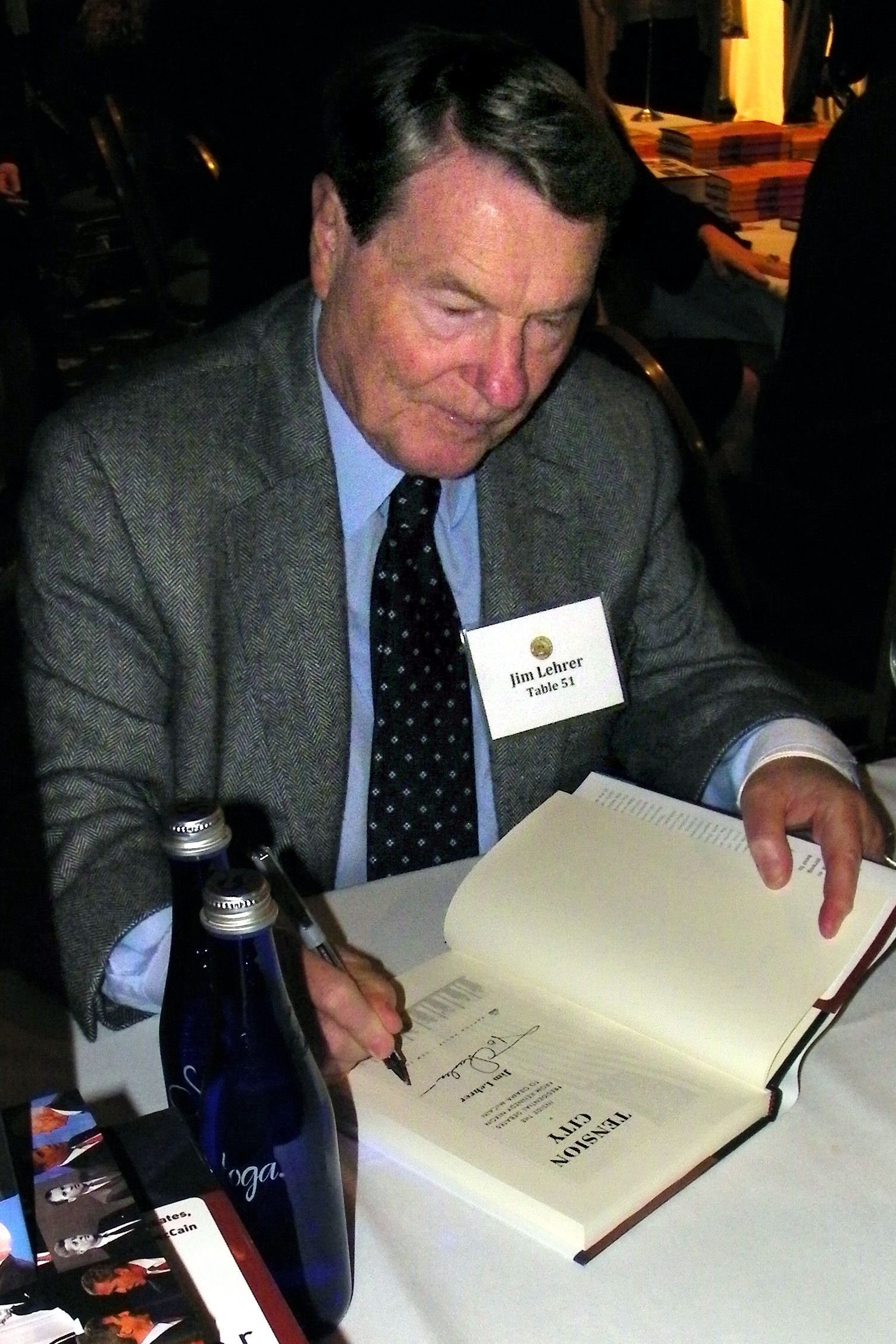
Lehrer signing copies of his book, Tension City: Inside the Presidential Debates, From Kennedy–Nixon to Obama–McCain, at the National Press Club Book Fair in 2011

For six decades until his death, Lehrer was married to Kate Lehrer, who is also a novelist. They had three daughters and six grandchildren. Lehrer was an avid bus enthusiast, a hobbyist, and a collector of bus memorabilia, including depot signs, driver caps, and antique toy buses. As a college student in the 1950s, he worked as a Trailways ticket agent in Victoria, Texas. Lehrer also was a supporter of the Pacific Bus Museum in Fremont, California, and the Museum of Bus Transportation in Hershey, Pennsylvania.

Lehrer was a prolific writer and authored numerous novels, as well as several plays, screenplays, and three personal memoirs. His book, Top Down, is a novel based on the events surrounding the Kennedy assassination. Lehrer's last play, Bell, was produced by the National Geographic Society as part of their 125th anniversary celebration.

=== Death ===
On January 23, 2020, Lehrer died from a heart attack at his home in Washington, D.C., at age 85. Lehrer's remains were cremated.

== Honors and awards ==
- Paul White Award, Radio Television Digital News Association (1990)
- Golden Plate Award of the American Academy of Achievement (1990)
- American Academy of Arts and Sciences member (elected in 1991)
- University of Missouri School of Journalism's Medal of Honor
- William Allen White Foundation Award for Journalistic Merit
- Peabody Award
- Fred Friendly First Amendment Award
- Two Emmy Awards
- Silver Circle of the Washington, D.C., chapter of the National Academy of Television Arts and Sciences (1999)
- Television Hall of Fame (1999)
- National Humanities Medal (1999)
- Walter Cronkite Award for Excellence in Journalism (2008)

== Bibliography ==
=== Novels ===
- Lehrer, Jim (1966). Viva Max!. Popular Library. OCLC 2274328.
- Lehrer, Jim (1988). Kick the Can. G. P. Putnam's Sons. ISBN 978-0-399-13350-3. LCCN 87019192. OCLC 255212916 – via Open Library.
- Lehrer, Jim (1989). Crown Oklahoma. G. P. Putnam's Sons. ISBN 978-0-399-13434-0. LCCN 88022829. OCLC 731920016 – via Open Library.
- Lehrer, Jim (1990). The Sooner Spy. G. P. Putnam's Sons. ISBN 978-0-399-13536-1. LCCN 89038737. OCLC 861791107 – via Open Library.
- Lehrer, Jim (1991). Lost and Found. G. P. Putnam's Sons. ISBN 978-0-399-13601-6. LCCN 90046015. OCLC 22308453 – via Open Library.
- Lehrer, Jim (1992). Short List. G. P. Putnam's Sons. ISBN 978-0-399-13665-8. LCCN 91000472. OCLC 23253839 – via Open Library.
- Lehrer, Jim (1993). Blue Hearts. Random House. ISBN 978-0-679-42216-7. LCCN 92037167. OCLC 26855772 – via Open Library.
- Lehrer, Jim (1994). Fine Lines. Thorndike Press. ISBN 978-0-517-16435-8. OCLC 806367677.
- Lehrer, Jim (1995). The Last Debate. Random House. ISBN 978-0-517-17761-7. LCCN 95211383. OCLC 879498946.
- Lehrer, Jim (1996). White Widow. Random House. ISBN 978-0-679-45236-2. LCCN 96001877. OCLC 917453147 – via Open Library.
- Lehrer, Jim (1998). Purple Dots. Random House. ISBN 978-0-679-45237-9. LCCN 98012962. OCLC 985841155 – via Open Library.
- Lehrer, Jim (2000). The Special Prisoner. Random House. ISBN 978-0-375-50371-9. LCCN 00701284. OCLC 663036459 – via Open Library.
- Lehrer, Jim (2002). No Certain Rest. Random House. ISBN 978-0-375-50372-6. LCCN 2002075177. OCLC 842874723 – via Open Library.
- Lehrer, Jim (2004). Flying Crows. Random House. ISBN 978-1-4000-6197-6. LCCN 2003058450. OCLC 859068318 – via Open Library.
- Lehrer, Jim (2005). The Franklin Affair. Random House. ISBN 978-1-4000-6198-3. OCLC 56510130.
- Lehrer, Jim (2006). The Phony Marine. Random House. ISBN 978-1-4000-6486-1. LCCN 2005057400. OCLC 836065464 – via Open Library.
- Lehrer, Jim (2007). Eureka. Random House. ISBN 978-1-4000-6487-8. LCCN 2006051884. OCLC 76864650 – via Open Library.
- Lehrer, Jim (2008). Mack to the Rescue. University of Oklahoma Press. ISBN 978-0806139159.
- Lehrer, Jim (2009). Oh, Johnny. Random House. ISBN 978-1-4000-6762-6. LCCN 2008016563. OCLC 223370189 – via Open Library.
- Lehrer, Jim (2010). Super. Random House. ISBN 978-1-4000-6763-3. LCCN 2009014448. OCLC 733775920 – via Open Library.
- Lehrer, Jim (2013). Top Down: A Novel of the Kennedy Assassination. Random House. ISBN 978-1-4000-6916-3. LCCN 2013007984. OCLC 861219286 – via Open Library.

=== Memoirs ===
- Lehrer, Jim (1975). We Were Dreamers. Atheneum Books. ISBN 978-0-689-10693-4. LCCN 75014679. OCLC 1692887 – via Open Library.
- Lehrer, Jim (1992). A Bus of My Own. G. P. Putnam's Sons. ISBN 978-0-399-13765-5. LCCN 92007526. OCLC 645850616 – via Open Library.
- Lehrer, Jim (2011). Tension City: Inside the Presidential Debates, From Kennedy–Nixon to Obama–McCain. Random House. ISBN 978-1-4000-6917-0. LCCN 2010015080. OCLC 1264094660 – via Open Library.

=== Screenplays ===
- An adaptation of White Widow has been written by Luke Wilson
- Viva Max! (1969) writing credit with Elliott Baker
- The Last Debate (2000) writing credit with Jon Maas

=== Plays ===
- The Will and Bart Show
- Church Key Charlie Blue
- Chili Queen
- Bell

Media offices
Preceded by Position created	NewsHour/PBS NewsHour anchor 1975–2011; Served alongside: Robert MacNeil (1975–1995)	Succeeded by Gwen Ifill; Judy Woodruff
