= 1996 United States presidential debates =

Part of the 1996 U.S. presidential election

- October 6, 1996; October 16, 1996

Nominee	Bill Clinton	Bob Dole
Party	Democratic	Republican
Home state	Arkansas	Kansas
- 1996 United States vice presidential debate
- October 9, 1996

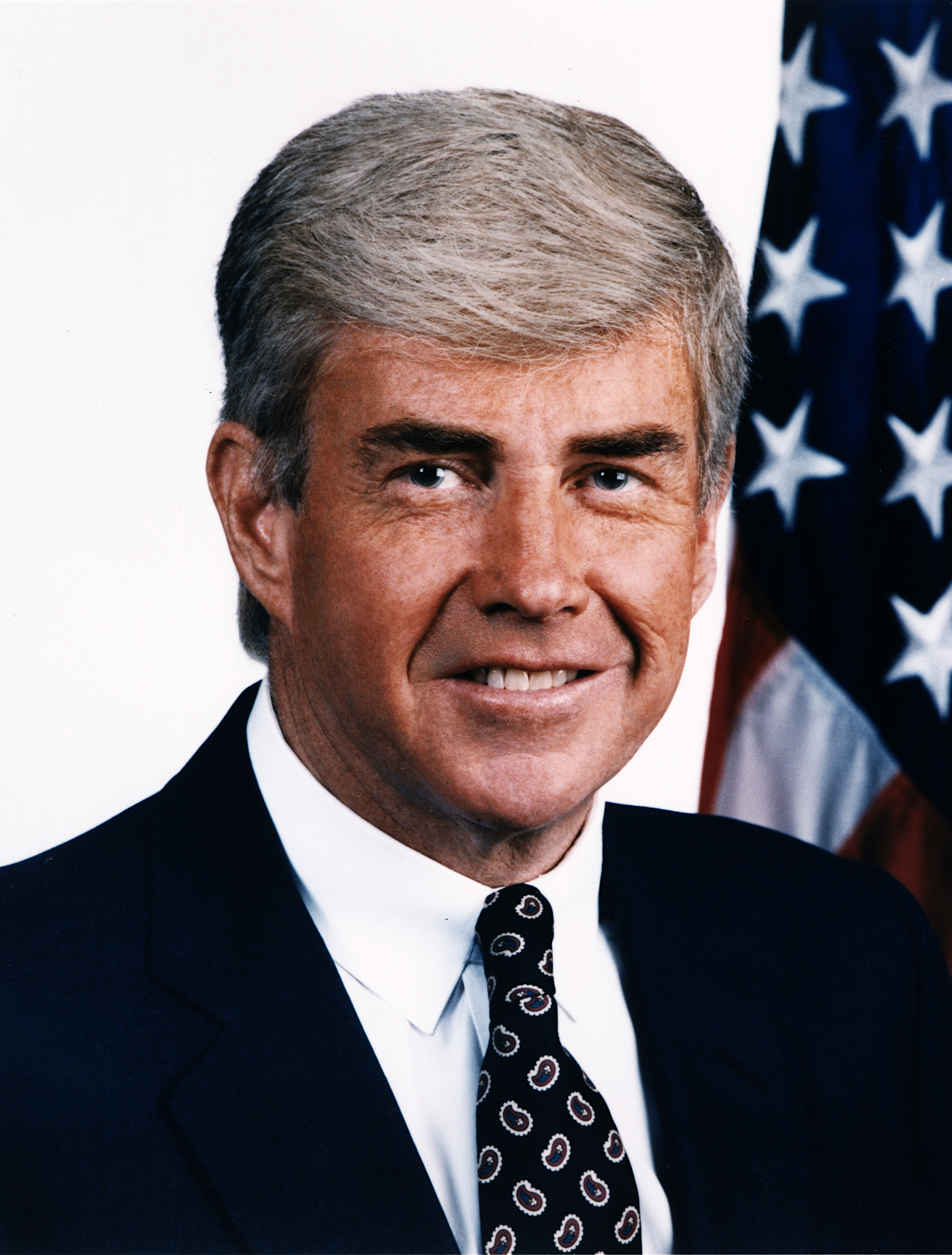
Nominee	Al Gore	Jack Kemp
Party	Democratic	Republican
Home state	Tennessee	Maryland

The 1996 United States presidential debates were a series of debates held during the 1996 presidential election.

The Commission on Presidential Debates (CPD), a bipartisan organization formed in 1987, organized three debates among the major party candidates, sponsored two presidential debates and one vice presidential debate. Only Democratic nominee Bill Clinton and Republican nominee Bob Dole met the criteria for inclusion in the debates, and thus were the only two to appear in the debates sponsored by the Commission on Presidential Debates. The CPD-sponsored vice presidential debate took place between their respective vice presidential running mates, Al Gore and Jack Kemp.

== Debate schedule ==
1996 United States presidential election debates
No.	Date & time	Host	Location	Moderator	Participants	
Key: P Participant N Non-invitee					Democratic	Republican
Key: P Participant N Non-invitee					President Bill Clinton of Arkansas	Senator Bob Dole of Kansas
1	Sunday, October 6, 1996; 9:00 – 10:30 p.m. EDT	The Bushnell Center for the Performing Arts	Hartford, Connecticut	Jim Lehrer of PBS	P	P
2	Wednesday, October 16, 1996; 9:00 – 10:30 p.m. EDT	University of San Diego	San Diego, California	Jim Lehrer of PBS	P	P
1996 United States vice presidential debate
No.	Date & time	Host	Location	Moderator	Participants	
Key: P Participant N Non-invitee					Democratic	Republican
Key: P Participant N Non-invitee					Vice President Al Gore of Tennessee	Secretary Jack Kemp of Maryland
VP	Wednesday, October 9, 1996; 9:00 – 10:30 p.m. EDT	Mahaffey Theater	St. Petersburg, Florida	Jim Lehrer of PBS	P	P

=== Participant selection ===
In 1996, the following six candidates achieved ballot access in enough states to mathematically win the election via the Electoral College:

Presidential candidate	Party	Ballot access
Bob Dole	Republican	50+DC
Bill Clinton	Democratic	50+DC
Ross Perot	Reform	50+DC
Harry Browne	Libertarian	50+DC
John Hagelin	Natural Law	43
Howard Phillips	Constitution	41

Unlike in 1992, Ross Perot was excluded from the debates in the 1996 campaign. Paul Kirk, co-chairman of the Commission on Presidential Debates stated that "Our decision was made on the basis that only President Clinton and Senator Dole have a realistic chance, as set forth in our criteria, to be elected the next president of the United States."

Only Dole and Clinton met the CPD selection criteria for any of the presidential debates. As a result, only their running mates Jack Kemp and Al Gore met the criteria for the vice presidential debate.

1996 was originally to have three presidential debates, with the first scheduled for Wednesday, September 25 at Washington University in St. Louis. However, Clinton's campaign objected to the date, noting it was one day after he was set to address the United Nations, and argued that it left him without sufficient time to prepare.

== October 6: First presidential debate (The Bushnell Center for the Performing Arts) ==
First presidential debate
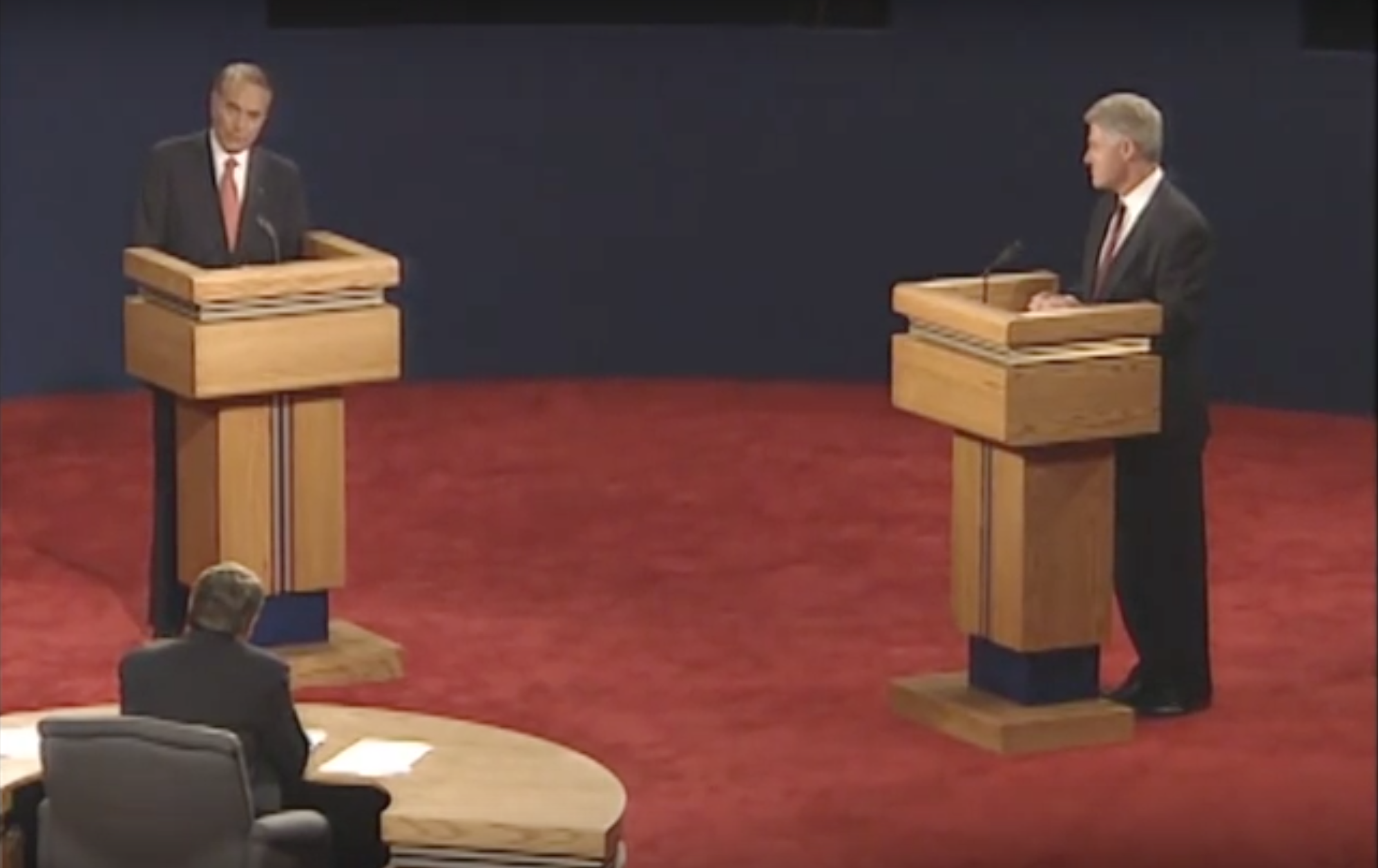
- Date(s): October 6, 1996
- Duration: 90 minutes
- Venue: The Bushnell Center for the Performing Arts
- Location: Hartford, Connecticut
- Participants: Bill Clinton; Bob Dole
- Moderator(s): Jim Lehrer of PBS

Full video of the first presidential debate

The first presidential debate between President Bill Clinton and former Senate Majority Leader Bob Dole took place on Sunday, October 6, 1996, in the Bushnell Center for the Performing Arts in Hartford, Connecticut

The debate was moderated by Jim Lehrer of PBS' The NewsHour, who posed the questions for each candidate.

=== Transcript ===
- Debate transcript from the Commission on Presidential Debates website.

=== Viewership ===
An estimated 46.1 million viewers tuned into the debates.

== October 9: Vice presidential debate (Mahaffey Theater) ==
Vice presidential debate
- Date(s): October 9, 1996
- Duration: 90 minutes
- Venue: Mahaffey Theater
- Location: St. Petersburg, Florida
- Participants: Al Gore; Jack Kemp
- Moderator(s): Jim Lehrer of PBS

The only vice presidential debate between Vice President Al Gore and former Secretary of Housing and Urban Development Jack Kemp took place on Wednesday, October 9, 1996, in the Mahaffey Theater in St. Petersburg, Florida.

The debate was moderated by Jim Lehrer of PBS' The NewsHour, who posed the questions for each candidate.

=== Transcript ===
- Debate transcript from the Commission on Presidential Debates website.

=== Viewership ===
An estimated 26.6 million viewers tuned into the debate.

== October 16: Second presidential debate (University of San Diego) ==
Second presidential debate
- Date(s): October 16, 1996
- Duration: 90 minutes
- Venue: University of San Diego
- Location: San Diego, California
- Participants: Bill Clinton; Bob Dole
- Moderator(s): Jim Lehrer of PBS

The second and final presidential debate between President Bill Clinton and former Senate Majority Leader Bob Dole took place on Wednesday, October 16, 1996, at the Shiley Theater on the campus of University of San Diego in San Diego, California.

The town hall style debate was moderated by Jim Lehrer of PBS' The NewsHour with featuring the questions asked by members of the audience.

=== Transcript ===
- Debate transcript from the Commission on Presidential Debates website.

=== Viewership ===
An estimated 36.3 million viewers tuned into the debate.

== Third-party debates ==
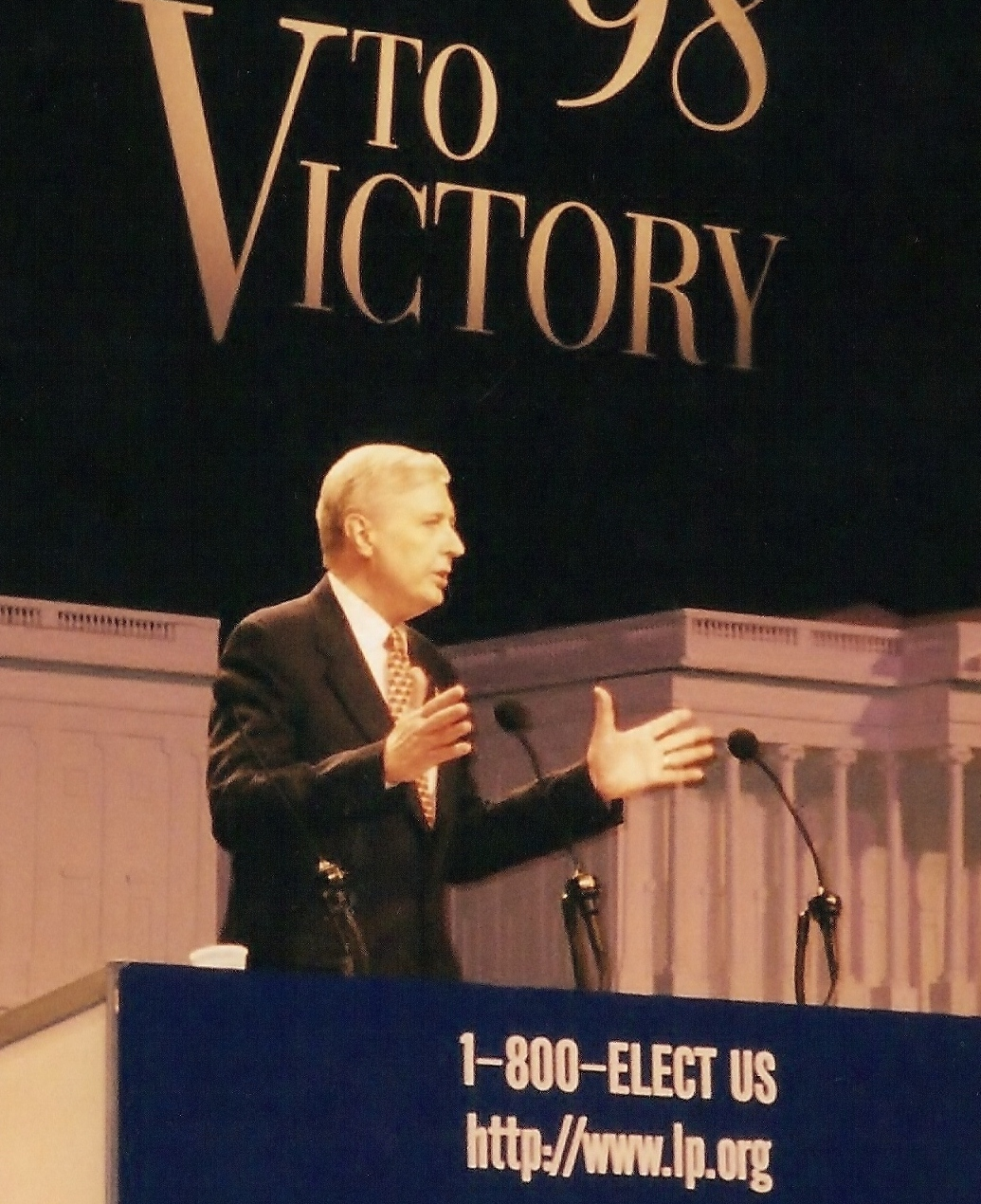
Harry Browne
Tennessee

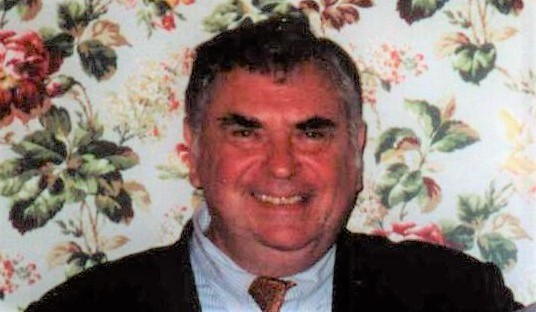
Howard Phillips
Virginia

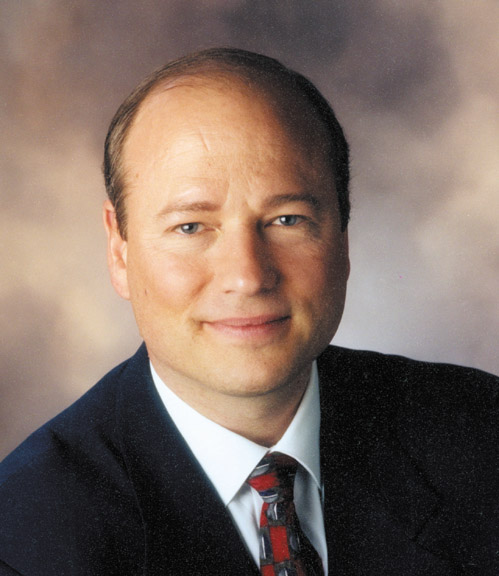
John Hagelin
Iowa

- October 7, 1996 - C-SPAN sponsored a third-party presidential debate moderated by Jennifer Laszlo. In attendance for this debate were Libertarian candidate Harry Browne, Constitution Party candidate Howard Phillips, and Natural Law Party candidate John Hagelin. Ross Perot declined the invitation to attend.
- October 23, 1996 - C-SPAN sponsored a third-party presidential debate moderated by Bill Shen. In attendance for this debate were Libertarian candidate Harry Browne, Constitution Party candidate Howard Phillips, and Natural Law Party candidate John Hagelin. Ross Perot declined the invitation to attend.

== See also ==
- Bill Clinton 1996 presidential campaign
- Bob Dole 1996 presidential campaign
- 1996 United States presidential election
