= Vilonia High School =

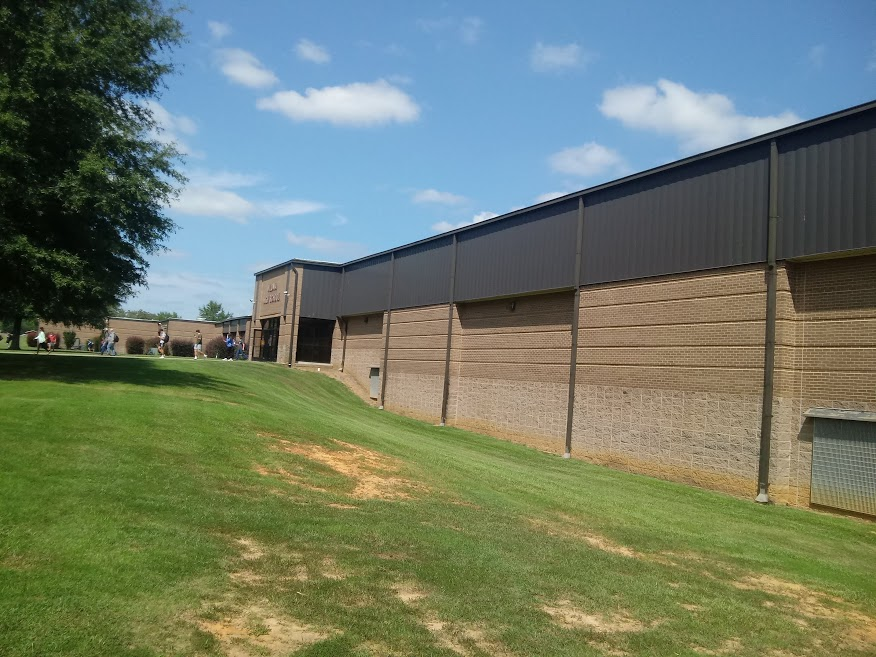

Location
- 1164 Main Street; Vilonia, Faulkner County, Arkansas 72173; United States; 35°5′6″N 92°11′38″W

Information
- School type: Public
- Established: 1874 (152 years ago)
- Status: Open
- School district: Vilonia School District
- NCES District ID: 0513530
- Authority: Arkansas Department of Education (ADE)
- CEEB code: 042530
- NCES School ID: 051353001110
- Principal: Ronnie Simmons
- Grades: 9-12
- Enrollment: 840 (2023-2024)
- Student to teacher ratio: 10.77
- Education system: ADE Smart Core curriculum
- Language: English
- Campus type: Suburban
- Colors: Red and white
- Slogan: VHS Never Quit
- Song: Vilonia Alma Mater
- Fight song: Cut Time Strut
- Athletics conference: 5A West (2012-14)
- Mascot: Eagle
- Team name: Vilonia Eagles
- Rival: Greenbrier High School
- Yearbook: The Eagle
- Communities served: Vilonia, Saltillo, Beryl, El Paso, Mt. Vernon, Liberty
- Feeder schools: Vilonia Middle School
- Affiliation: Arkansas Activities Association
- Website: www.viloniaschools.org/o/vhs

Vilonia High School is one of the six high schools located in Faulkner County, Arkansas. Vilonia High School is a public school that serves students from the tenth to the twelfth grade. Vilonia High School is the only high school found in Vilonia School District. The school was established in 1874, and it offers many different activities such as sports and extracurriculars to participate in.

== History ==
In 1874, the first school in Vilonia was opened by William T. Suttle. At first the school was strictly a private school and class was held on the ground floor in a log cabin used by the Masons of the town. The school went public in 1880. A dedicated two story frame school building was constructed around 1900. The first brick school was erected in 1928, but burned down in 1942. Classes were held in a local Nazarene church until a new schoolhouse was constructed. This schoolhouse remains in use as an art building, and is the oldest facility on campus. In 1963, a new ten classroom elementary school was constructed; which later became a middle school until the construction of a new middle school in 2006. The 1963 building is now part of the high school campus. In 1973-1974, across from this building, an addition to the school featuring a science lab, new classrooms, and a library was constructed. Eventually, in 1984, the west campus of Vilonia High was completed, which later became a junior high, but is now a satellite campus for freshman. In 1995, due to a large influx of people to the district, a new high school was constructed east of the old west campus. This building is the main section of the school, however, older buildings also remain in use. On April 25, 2011, the town of Vilonia was hit hard by an EF-2 tornado and as a result. the city received a FEMA grant for $1.3 million and used it to build a safe room at the school to serve the community. The safe room is a second gym with a basketball court in it, but the walls are thick with concrete. The room is 6,500 square feet and can hold up to 1,150 people at capacity.

== Curriculum ==
Vilonia High School has been accredited by AdvancED (formerly North Central Association) since 1987. The assumed course of study follows the Smart Core curriculum developed the Arkansas Department of Education (ADE), which requires students to complete 22 credit units before graduation. Students engage in regular and Advanced Placement (AP) coursework and exams. Through a partnership with the University of Arkansas at Little Rock, students may also enroll in concurrent credit courses.

== Sports ==
Vilonia High School offers a plethora of sports to play. These include archery, baseball, basketball (boys/girls), bowling, cross country, football, fishing, golf, soccer, swimming, trap shooting, tennis, track and field, and volleyball. Vilonia is a part of the 5A West Conference which is determined by the Arkansas Activities Association. Football games take place at Phillip D. Weaver Memorial Stadium. The basketball team won the state championship in 1934. Additionally, the girls' basketball team won the Class "A" championship in 1971, after being runners-up in 1970. The boys bowling team won back-to-back state championships in 2005 and 2006. The baseball team won the 5A state championship game in 2017. The Vilonia track team has won three state championships, and two state runner ups in the last eight years. The softball team won back to back state championships in 2015 and 2016.

== Notable alumni ==
- Jimmie Lou Fisher - Arkansas State Treasurer (1981-2003)
