= Kate Lehrer =

American writer (born 1939)

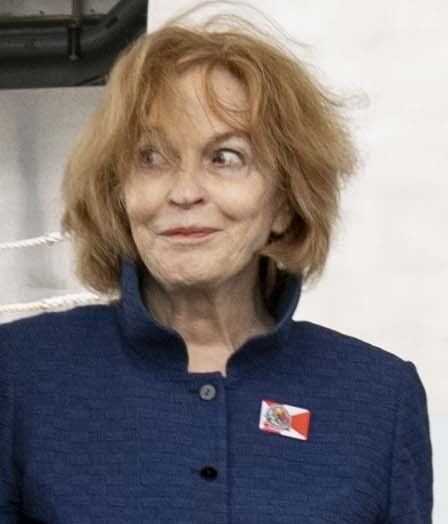
- Born: Kate Tom Staples; December 17, 1939 (age 86); Waco, Texas, US
- Education: Texas Christian University
- Occupations: Novelist; book reviewer; writer
- Spouse: Jim Lehrer (m. 1960; died 2020)
- Children: 3

Kate Lehrer (born Kate Tom Staples; December 17, 1939) is an American writer, novelist and book reviewer from Washington, D.C., and a panelist on the Diane Rehm Book Club on National Public Radio. She is the widow of fellow writer and journalist Jim Lehrer.

== Literary career ==
Lehrer has written four novels, as well as numerous short stories, essays, and book reviews. Her first novel, Best Intentions, was published in 1987. When They Took Away the Man in the Moon came out in 1993. Out of Eden, which won the Western Heritage Award for Outstanding Novel, was published in 1996. Confessions of a Bigamist: A Novel, described by the Washington Post as whimsical and droll, was published in 2004.

Publishers Weekly describes Lehrer's writing style as intelligent and mannered. The Washington Post characterizes her work as fitting into “the burgeoning category of chicklit.”

In 2004, she was awarded an Honorary Doctor of Letters degree by McDaniel College.

== Personal life ==
Lehrer was born Kate Tom Staples in Waco, Texas, as the only child of Thomas Malcolm Staples, a county extension agent, and Lucy Joplin, a social worker. She attended Texas Christian University where she was a member of Kappa Alpha Theta.

Kate was married to Jim Lehrer, the news anchor for the PBS NewsHour on PBS, from 1960 until his death in 2020. They had three children and six grandchildren.

== Honors and awards ==
- Western Heritage Award for Outstanding Novel (1996)
- Honorary Doctor of Letters, McDaniel College (2004)

== Sources ==
- "National Book Festival 2004: Kate Lehrer". Washington: The Library of Congress. Archived from the original on September 11, 2009.
- Lehrer, Kate (April 1, 2009). "Don't Call Me Granny". The Washingtonian.
- "Kate Lehrer Bio" (PDF). The Key School. Archived from the original (PDF) on July 20, 2011.
- Lehrer, Kate (2003). Out of Eden: A Novel. ISBN 1931868336.
