= Timeline of the George W. Bush presidency =

George W. Bush, a Republican from Texas, was elected President of the United States on December 12, 2000 (following the U.S. Supreme Court decision in Bush v. Gore) and was inaugurated as the nation's 43rd president on January 20, 2001. He was re-elected on November 2, 2004; his second inauguration was on January 20, 2005, and his presidency ended on January 20, 2009, with the inauguration of Barack Obama. The following articles cover the timeline of Bush's presidency, and the time leading up to it:

- Pre-presidency: 1999–2001
  - George W. Bush 2000 presidential campaign
  - Presidential transition of George W. Bush
- Presidency: 2001–2009
  - Timeline of the George W. Bush presidency (2001)
  - Timeline of the George W. Bush presidency (2002)
  - Timeline of the George W. Bush presidency (2003)
  - Timeline of the George W. Bush presidency (2004)
  - Timeline of the George W. Bush presidency (2005)
  - Timeline of the George W. Bush presidency (2006)
  - Timeline of the George W. Bush presidency (2007)
  - Timeline of the George W. Bush presidency (2008–2009)

Post-presidency of George W. Bush : 2009–present

== See also ==
- Timeline of the Bill Clinton presidency, for his predecessor
- Timeline of the Barack Obama presidency, for his successor
