= Timeline of the George W. Bush presidency (2003) =

Bush in 2003

The following is a timeline of the presidency of George W. Bush, from January 1, 2003, to December 31, 2003.

== January ==
- January 2 – Bush reaffirms his intent to focus on safeguarding the United States and its people and says that the administration is working with foreign allies to convince North Korea to discontinue the creation and proliferating of weapons of mass destruction (WMD) while speaking to the press at the Prairie Chapel Ranch in Crawford, Texas.
- January 3 – President Bush attends a rally of American troops at Fort Hood in Killeen, Texas, during the morning. President Bush announces his nomination of Ross Owen for Special Trustee for American Indians at the Department of the Interior.
- January 4 – President Bush issues a statement on the African Growth and Opportunity Act.
- January 20 – President Bush speaks at the First Baptist Church in Landover, Maryland. Bush calls on those present to "remember the dream of Martin Luther King and remember his clear vision for a society that's equal and a society full of justice, this society must remember the power of faith."
- January 22 – The Senate confirms Tom Ridge for United States Secretary of Homeland Security.
- January 24 – Tom Ridge is sworn in as United States Secretary of Homeland Security in the Cross Hall.
- January 25 – President Bush talks about domestic policies in a radio address.
- January 27 – President Bush announces the nominations of nine individuals for membership to the Cultural Property Advisory Committee.
- January 28 – President Bush delivers his annual State of the Union Address before a joint session of Congress.
- January 29 – President Bush makes a call for reform of the Medicare system within the US during a speech at Devos Performance Hall in Grand Rapids, Michigan.
- January 30 – President Bush has a White House meeting with Prime Minister of Italy Silvio Berlusconi and a joint press conference with Berlusconi later in the day. Bush commemorates the anniversary of the United States Freedom Corps during a speech in Washington. Vice President Dick Cheney speaks at the 30th Political Action Conference in Arlington, Virginia.
- January 31 – President Bush delivers an address on HIV both domestically and worldwide in Room 450 of the Dwight E. Eisenhower Executive Office Building during the morning. In the afternoon, the President meets with Prime Minister of the United Kingdom Tony Blair at the White House, President Bush saying afterward in a joint conference that their discussion was on "a lot of issues." President Bush announces his nominations of Ellen G. Engleman for membership on the National Transportation Safety Board, Jerry Pinkney and Karen Lias Wolff for membership on the National Council on the Arts, Jose Luis Galvez III for membership on the National Capital Planning Commission, and designation of Diane M. Stuart for Acting Director of the Violence Against Women Office at the Department of Justice.

== February ==
- February 1 – Space Shuttle Columbia is destroyed upon re-entering the Earth's atmosphere. All seven crew members perish.
- February 2 – President Bush addresses the casualty of the Space Shuttle Columbia disaster during a memorial service at the Johnson Space Center.
- February 5 – President Bush meets with congressional leaders at the White House to discuss Secretary of State Collin Powell's presentation at the United Nations attempting to convince other countries of Iraq's defying of disagreement resolutions.
- February 6 – President Bush announces an initiative of 1.2 million aimed at hydrogen fuel of high interest for both vehicle empowerment and electricity generation while at the National Building Museum in Washington.
- February 7 – While at the Treasury Department, Bush tells reporters the meeting of the UN Security Council is at "a defining moment" in having to decide whether there will be "any force" in the resolution ordering Iraq to disarm.
- February 8 – President Bush issues a written statement on the El Nogal Club blast in Colombia from the previous night through the White House.
- February 9 – The Homeland Security Council raises the national threat level of chemical or biological attacks from Al-Qaeda from yellow to orange.
- February 10 – President Bush accuses Saddam Hussein of regarding Iraqis as "human shields" during a speech to the National Religious Broadcasters convention.
- February 11 – Pentagon officials state military vehicles equipped with anti-aircraft missiles have been released to guard Washington and patrols of fighter jets around Washington, D.C. and New York City have increased thanks to elevated risks of a terrorist attack.
- February 24–25 – President Bush holds a bilateral meeting with Bulgarian Prime Minister Simeon Saxe-Coburg-Gotha.

== March ==
- March 1 – President Bush discusses reforming Iraq during his radio address.
- March 4 – President Bush delivers a speech on Medicare reform during the morning.
- March 5 – President Bush has a half-hour long meeting with Cardinal Pio Laghi, Laghi saying after the meeting that he conveyed Pope John Paul II's to not go to war with Iraq.
- March 14 – President Bush delivers an address on achieving peace in the Middle East in the Rose Garden during the morning.
- March 15 – President Bush discusses the leadership of Iraq and efforts by the US to intervene during his radio address.
- March 16 – President Bush declares the following day will be "the day that we will determine whether or not diplomacy can work" while in Azores, Portugal during the evening.
- March 17 – President Bush promises Saddam Hussein will soon be gone and issues a 48-hour ultimatum to Saddam and his sons in a televised address from the White House.
- March 19 – President Bush addresses the nation from the Oval Office and declares war with Iraq.
- March 21 – President Bush issues a statement thanking Congress for "resolutions which said loud and clear, our country supports the men and women in uniform."
- March 23 – President Bush holds a questions and answers session on the ongoing conflict in Iraq, saying he is "pleased with the progress that we're making", in the afternoon hours.
- March 26 – President Bush delivers a speech at the MacDill Air Force Base in Tampa, Florida during the morning. President Bush issues a statement on the death of Daniel Patrick Moynihan.
- March 28 – President Bush gives a praiseful speech on the United States Military in the East Room of the White House.
- March 29 – President Bush claims the United States and coalition troops "have cleared mines from the water and taken control of a key port city, to allow humanitarian aid to begin flowing into" Iraq during his weekly radio address.
- March 31 – President Bush delivers a speech at the Port of Philadelphia.

== April ==
- April 3 – President Bush delivers a speech on Iraq to service members and their families at the Marine Corps Base Camp Lejeune in Camp Lejeune, North Carolina.
- April 4 – President Bush issues a statement praising Congress "for responding with bipartisan cooperation and speed to my request for supplemental war funding."
- April 5 – President Bush mentions the aid that Americans have given to Iraqis and the war in general during his radio address.
- April 8 – President Bush holds a meeting with Prime Minister of the United Kingdom Tony Blair at the Hillsborough Castle in Belfast, Northern Ireland.
- April 9 – President Bush releases a statement in support of the Senate's choice to pass faith-based legislation, following the capture of Baghdad, Bush issued a statement celebrating the end of major combat operations and the success of the invasion in toppling the dictator Saddam Hussein after the United States coalition forces, including the British and other NATO allies, had been advancing on Baghdad for weeks, "this legislation contains key elements of the faith-based initiative that I proposed more than two years ago to encourage more charitable giving and rally the armies of compassion that exist in communities all across America."
- April 10 – President Bush, speaking directly to Iraqis in his statement, proclaims the "nightmare that Saddam Hussein has brought to your nation will soon be over."
- April 11 – President Bush and First Lady Laura Bush visit Walter Reed Army Medical Center and National Naval Medical Center.
- April 28 – President Bush releases a statement on the death of Edward Gaylord, lauding his life and expressing condolences to his family. President Bush delivers an address on Iraq at the Ford Community and Performing Arts Center in Dearborn, Michigan during the afternoon.
- April 29 – President Bush releases a statement expressing his satisfaction with Jeffrey Sutton being confirmed by the Senate for Judge on the U.S. Court of Appeals for the 6th Circuit. President Bush delivers an address calling on both chambers of Congress to respond to the Global HIV/AIDS Initiative in the East Room during the afternoon.
- April 30 – President Bush announces the Teacher of the Year during a morning ceremony in the First Lady's Garden honoring state teachers. President Bush and President of Colombia Álvaro Uribe speak with reporters in the Oval Office during the afternoon. President Bush signs the PROTECT Act of 2003 into law during an afternoon ceremony. Bush says the law will "formally establish the federal government's role in the Amber Alert system and will make punishment for federal crimes against children more severe." President Bush signs the Smallpox Emergency Personnel Protection Act of 2003 into law, resulting in the establishment of "a new Federal program to compensate eligible health care workers, public safety personnel, and other first responders who suffer serious reactions or die as a result of receiving the smallpox vaccine."

== May ==
- May 1 – President Bush, during the Mission Accomplished speech, announces the end of major combat operations after the invasion of Iraq, which delivered aboard the USS Abraham Lincoln, effectively marked the end of the invasion and the U.S. occupation of Iraq begins.

== July ==
- July 1 – President Bush delivers an address on his administration's education policy at Kipp D.C. Key Academy while in Washington, D.C. during the morning. Vice President Cheney delivers the eulogy for Strom Thurmond at First Baptist Church in Columbia, South Carolina during the afternoon. President Bush gives a speech on US progress in Iraq and Afghanistan while in the East Room during the afternoon.
- July 2 – President Bush announces his nomination of Randall Tobias for Global AIDS Coordinator in the Roosevelt Room during the morning.
- July 3 – President Bush answers questions from reporters regarding his impending Africa trip in the Roosevelt Room during the morning and provided an update on the current situation on the Iraq War and stated "There are some who feel like, that the conditions are such that they can attack us there. My answer is, bring them on. We've got the force necessary to deal with the security situation. Of course we want other countries to help us Great Britain is there, Poland is there, Ukraine is there, you mentioned".
- July 3 – President Bush signs S. 1276 into law, the Strengthen AmeriCorps Program Act, which clarify "the methods by which the Corporation for National and Community Service (CNCS) records obligations to the National Service Trust for volunteer educational awards by authorizing the use of estimating method-ology similar to other comparable programs."
- July 4 – President Bush gives a speech at the United States Air Force Museum in Dayton, Ohio during the afternoon on Independence Day.
- July 5 – President Bush discusses Independence Day during his radio address.
- July 16 – President Bush delivers an address in Room 450 of the Dwight DC Eisenhower Executive Office Building.
- July 17 – President Bush holds a joint press conference with Prime Minister Tony Blair.
- July 18 – President Bush gives a speech on health at Lakewest Family YMCA in Dallas, Texas.
- July 23 – President Bush gives an update on the Iraq War in the Rose Garden and announces the deaths of Saddam's sons Uday Hussein and Qusay Hussein after U.S. forces killed them on a raid.
- July 29 – President Bush meets with Prime Minister of Israel Ariel Sharon. Bush addresses the meeting in the Rose Garden.
- July 30 – President Bush commemorates the 38th anniversary of Medicare, calling it a "time for action."

== November ==
- November 1 – President Bush speaks at Jones Park in Gulfport, Mississippi, indicating his interest in working with Haley Barbour.
- November 5 – President Bush signs the Partial-Birth Abortion Ban Act into law.
- November 14 – President Bush meets with President of Italy Carlo Azeglio Ciampi in the Oval Office. The two presidents jointly deliver remarks publicly after the meeting.
- November 19 – President Bush speaks about his administration's policy in Iraq at Royal Banqueting House-Whitehall Palace at London, England.
- November 21 – President Bush issues a statement on the following day's marking of the fortieth anniversary of the assassination of the late President John F. Kennedy.
- November 24 – President Bush delivers a speech before troops at the Butts Army Air Field in Fort Carson, Colorado.
- November 25 – At Spring Valley Hospital in Las Vegas, Nevada, Bush praises Congress for passing Medicare reforms that he says will "strengthen" and "modernize" the system along with providing better care for American seniors.
- November 27 – Thanksgiving Day, President Bush visits American troops in Iraq.

== December ==
- December 1 – President Bush signs S.J.Res. 18, S.J.Res. 22, S. 1066, and H.R. 2754 into law. President Bush speaks at a reception fundraising for his re-election campaign at the Hyatt Regency in Dearborn, Michigan during the afternoon. President Bush delivers a speech on the economy at the Dynamic Metal Treating International in Dearborn during the afternoon.
- December 2 – The Adoption Promotion Act of 2003 is signed by President Bush during the morning. President Bush speaks at a reception for his re-election campaign at the Westin Convention Center Hotel in Pittsburgh, Pennsylvania during the morning.
- December 4 – First Lady Laura Bush unveils the Christmas decorations at the White House for the third time.
- December 8 – President Bush signs the Medicare Modernization Act.
- December 13 – Operation Red Dawn leads to the capture of Iraqi president Saddam Hussein.
- December 14 – President Bush gives a five-minute televised address, remarking on the capture of Hussein that he will "face the justice he denied to millions", adding that his capture will bring further credence to the Iraqis that an end has been put to both torture chambers and secret police.
- December 16 – President Bush signs the American Dream Downpayment Act of 2003 into law at the Department of Housing and Urban Development during the afternoon. Bush says the law "will help many low-income buyers to overcome that hurdle, and to achieve an important part of the American Dream."
- December 17 – President Bush gives a speech commemorating the centennial of the Wright Brothers flights of 1909 at the Wright Brothers National Memorial in Kill Devil Hills, North Carolina during the morning.
- December 18 – President Bush delivers a speech at the Walter Reed Army Medical Center in Washington, D.C. during the afternoon.
- December 19 – President Bush delivers an address in response to Muammar Gaddafi stating "his commitment to disclose and dismantle all weapons of mass destruction programs in his country" in the James S. Brady Briefing Room during the afternoon.
- December 22 – President Bush travels to the Shiloh Baptist Church in Alexandria, Virginia during the afternoon. President Bush attends the lighting ceremony for the Menorah at Bookseller's Area during the afternoon.
- December 27 – President Bush discusses Christmas during his radio address.
- December 30 – President Bush issues an executive order adjusting pay rates.

== See also ==
- Timeline of the George W. Bush presidency, for an index of the Bush presidency timeline articles

U.S. presidential administration timelines
Preceded by Bush presidency (2002)	Bush presidency (2003)	Succeeded by Bush presidency (2004)
