= Timeline of the George W. Bush presidency (2002) =

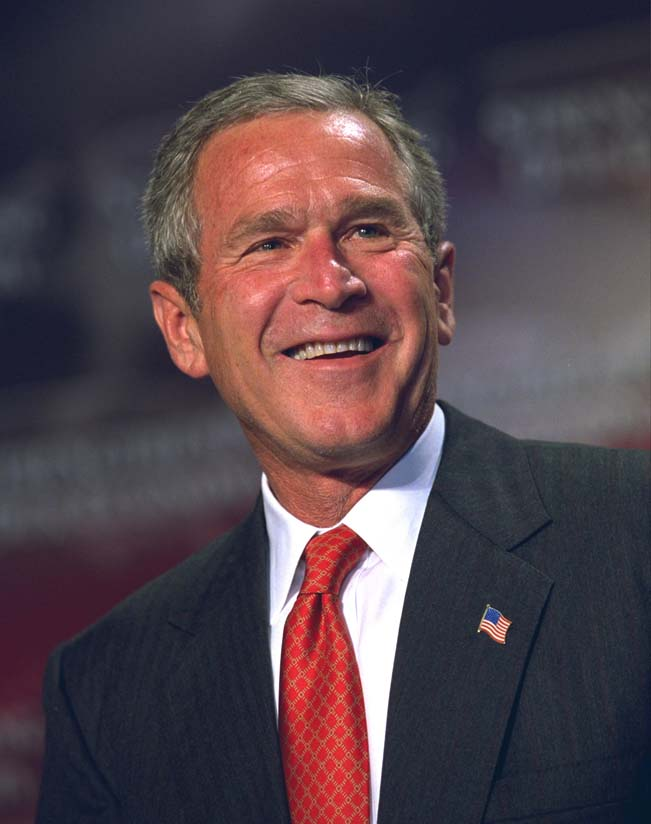
Bush in 2002

The following is a timeline of the presidency of George W. Bush, from January 1, 2002 to December 31, 2002.

== January ==
- January 8 – President Bush signs the No Child Left Behind Act into law.
- January 11 – President Bush signs the Small Business Liability Relief and Brownfields Revitalization Act into law, Guantanamo Bay detention camp is established.
- January 13 – President Bush chokes on a pretzel and faints.
- January 22 – President Bush promotes his proposed Economic Security Package during a speech in Charleston, West Virginia.
- January 29 – President Bush delivers his annual State of the Union Address before a joint session of Congress. During the address, the president pointedly accuses three countries—Iran, Iraq, and North Korea—of sponsoring terrorism and attempting to amass weapons of mass destruction, activities that threaten the peace of the world, and declares that nations like these three constitute an axis of evil.
- January 31 – President Bush travels to Daytona Beach, Florida, where he promotes the federal government's Senior Corps program.

== February ==
- February 4 – President Bush presents Congress with a wartime budget of $2.1 trillion, which sees a return to deficit spending by the federal government.
- February 7 – President Bush signs the "Humane Treatment of Taliban and al Qaeda Detainees" memorandum, reversing American's commitments to parts of the Geneva Convention.
- February 8 - President Bush declared open the 2002 Winter Olympics in Salt Lake City, Utah.
- February 13 – President Bush meets with President of Pakistan Pervez Musharraf.
- February 14 – President Bush reveals tax credits among a number of other incentives designed to encourage business and farmers to decrease harmful emissions.
- February 15 – President Bush endorses the Department of Energy's recommendation that an underground facility be constructed at Yucca Mountain in Nevada for use as a repository for up to 77,000 metric tons of spent nuclear fuel and other high level radioactive waste.
- February 16–22 – President Bush makes the sixth international trip of his presidency.
  - February 16–19 – In Tokyo, Japan, the president meets with Prime Minister Junichiro Koizumi and Emperor Akihito. He also addresses the Japanese Diet.
  - February 19–21 – In Seoul, South Korea, the president meets with President Kim Dae-jung. He also visits Dorasan, near the Korean Demilitarized Zone, and addresses U.S. military personnel at Osan Air Base.
  - February 21–22 – In Beijing, China, the president meets with President Jiang Zemin and Premier Zhu Rongji.

== March ==
- March 4 – During an appearance in Minnesota, the president offers condolences to the families of the eight soldiers killed during Operation Anaconda in Afghanistan, and vows that the U.S. will continue to pursue Al Qaeda.
- March 5 – President Bush announces that tariffs of 8% to 30% will be placed on several types of imported steel in an effort to support the faltering U.S. steel industry.
- March 9 – President Bush signs the Job Creation and Worker Assistance Act of 2002 into law.
- March 11 – In marking the six month anniversary of the September 11 attacks, the president pledges that America would not forget the lives lost nor the justice needed in response.
- March 13 – President Bush in a press conference at the White House, when asked about Osama bin Laden, Bush replied "I truly am not that concerned about him. I know he is on the run. I was concerned about him, when he had taken over a country. I was concerned about the fact that he was basically running Afghanistan and calling the shots for the Taliban". and "Terror is bigger than one person. And he's a person who's now been marginalized. His network, his host government has been destroyed. He's the ultimate parasite who found weakness, exploited it, and met his match. He is as I mentioned in my speech, I do mention the fact that this is a fellow who is willing to commit youngsters to their death and he, himself, tries to hide if, in fact, he's hiding at all".
- March 20 – White House Press Secretary Ari Fleischer announces that the Bush administration will not certify North Korea's compliance with a 1994 deal that froze its nuclear weapons program.
- March 22 – The Bush administration announces that tariffs averaging 29% will be placed on Canadian softwood lumber imports in an effort to protect U.S. lumber jobs from subsidized Canadian imports.
- March 21–24 – President Bush makes the seventh international trip of his presidency. During his weekly radio address, the president states that he is visiting Mexico, Peru and El Salvador to validate "the central importance" he places on America's relationships with the various nations in hemisphere.
  - March 21–22 – President Bush attends the U.N. International Conference on Financing for Development in Monterrey, Mexico. He also meets with Mexican President Vicente Fox to discuss mutual security concerns regarding traffic on cross-border rail lines and at major ports of entry along the Mexico–United States border.
  - March 23–24 – In Lima, Peru, the president meets with the presidents of Peru, Colombia, and Bolivia, and with the vice president of Ecuador.
  - March 24 – President Bush attends a summit meeting of presidents of the several Central American Integration System countries to discuss the creation of a free trade area similar to NAFTA.
- March 26 – President Bush announces Elias Zerhouni and Richard Carmona as his choices for National Institute of Health Director and U.S. Surgeon General in an East Room ceremony.
- March 27 – President Bush signs the Bipartisan Campaign Reform Act into law.
- March 28 – During an appearance at a campaign fundraiser for John Cornyn, President Bush says he is working to eliminate the chance of terrorist organizations aligning with "some of the world's worst leaders who harbor and develop some of the world's worst weapons."
- March 30 – President Bush addresses the crisis in the Middle East from his ranch as Israeli troops advance toward the compound of Palestinian leader Yasser Arafat and after a suicide bombing in Tel Aviv.
- March 30 – President Bush issues a brief statement of condolence following the death of Britain's Queen Elizabeth The Queen Mother.

== April ==
- April 10 – Declaring that "advances in biomedical technology must never come at the expense of human conscience," the president urges the Senate to concur with a House bill prohibiting human cloning for either research or reproduction, while delivering remarks in the East Room.
- April 17 – Speaking before cadets at the Virginia Military Institute in Lexington, Virginia, the president vows the keep the U.S. engaged in Afghanistan "until the mission is done," calling for a plan he equated to the plan devised by General George C. Marshall for Europe at the close of World War II.
- April 19 – While talking to reporters in the Oval Office, President Bush touts Secretary of State Colin Powell's diplomacy in the Middle East as having forged a "path to achieve peace".
- April 20–25 – President Bush holds a bilateral meeting with the Prime Minister of Bulgaria Simeon Saxe-Coburg-Gotha.
- April 20 – President Bush requests Arab nations combat their own forms of terrorism within their respective regions in his weekly radio address.
- April 22 – President Bush gives an Earth Day speech in the Adirondack Mountains in New York, noting his "Clear Skies Initiative".
- April 23 – White House Counselor Karen Hughes announces her plans to resign during the summer; she has worked for George W. Bush since 1994.
- April 24 – President Bush attends the Lake Area Corn Processors ethanol plant grand opening near Wentworth, South Dakota.
- April 25 – President Bush meets with Saudi Arabian prince Abdullah at his Texas ranch for a two-hour talk, during which Abdullah warns Bush against losing stability within the Middle East by not doing more in an attempt to stop Ariel Sharon's strategy against the Palestinians.

== May ==
- May 10 – President Bush requests both parties come together in Congress to help reauthorize a welfare reform bill first passed in 1996.
- May 13 – President Bush signs the Farm Security and Rural Investment Act of 2002, a 10-year, $190 billion farm bill increasing the federal subsidy paid to farmers by at least $83 billion over the next decade.
- May 16 – Congress presses the Bush White House for additional information on the various intelligence warnings that al-Qaeda was planning a major attack somewhere on U.S. territory. National Security Advisor Condoleezza Rice tells reporters, "I don’t think that anybody could have predicted that these people would take an airplane and slam it into the World Trade Center, take another one and slam it into the Pentagon." She insists that there was no lapse in intelligence.
- May 18 – President Bush requests a reform in the Medicare program during his weekly Saturday radio address, citing the costs being too high and the choices seniors need not being provided.

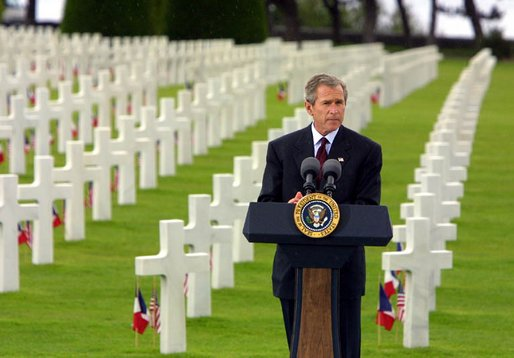
President George W. Bush at the Normandy American Cemetery at Normandy Beach in France, May 27, 2002.

- May 22–28 – President Bush makes the eighth international trip of his presidency. Speaking from the White House lawn before his departure, the president says the U.S. and European allies must continue battling terror and be strong.
  - May 22–23 – In Berlin, Germany, the president meets with Chancellor Gerhard Schröder, and addresses the Bundestag.
  - May 23–26 – The president travels to Moscow and St. Petersburg, Russia for a summit meeting with Russian President Vladimir Putin. The two leaders sign the Strategic Offensive Reductions Treaty, an agreement to reduce the nuclear arsenal of each country to a warhead count of between 1,700 and 2,200.
  - May 26–27, 2002 – The president travels to Paris, France, where he meets with French President Jacques Chirac. He also visits Sainte-Mère-Église, and Colleville, where he delivers a Memorial Day address at the Normandy American Cemetery and Memorial.
  - May 27–28 – In Rome, Italy, the president meets with Italy's President Carlo Azeglio Ciampi and Prime Minister Silvio Berlusconi, attends the NATO Summit Meeting and inaugurates the NATO-Russia Council.
  - May 28 – The president travels to the Apostolic Palace in Vatican City for an audience with Pope John Paul II, during which they discuss the sex-abuse scandal in the American Roman Catholic priesthood, among other issues.

== June ==
- June 1 – President Bush delivers an address at the United States Military Academy in West Point, New York.
- June 3 – During an appearance in Little Rock, Arkansas, the president acknowledges the criticism of the nation's top law enforcement and intelligence agencies for failing to prevent the September 11 attacks, saying the FBI is "doing a better job" and is sharing intelligence information with the CIA.
- June 4 – While speaking to reporters during a tour of the National Security Agency, the president says there is no evidence of the U.S. government being able to prevent the 9/11 strikes.
- June 6 – President Bush calls on Congress to make broad changes to security departments in charge of protecting the nation from terrorism, by creating a single Cabinet-level homeland defense agency to coordinate a wide range of functions and oversee more than 100 organizations.
- June 8 – President Bush equates the establishment of the Department of Homeland Security to the creation of the Defense Department and National Security Council under President Harry Truman during the Cold War.
- June 9 – President Bush designates José Padilla as an enemy combatant, ending Padilla's tenure as a material witness.
- June 17 – President Bush announces his "aggressive housing agenda" while speaking at St. Paul AME Church in Atlanta, Georgia. His goal is to boost minority home ownership to 5.5 million prior to the end of the decade by dismantling the barriers to homeownership. The president also challenged the real estate and mortgage finance industries to join in his effort.
- June 19 – President Bush pledges $500 million in U.S. support over the next few years for worldwide efforts to combat the AIDS virus during a Rose Garden appearance.
- June 24 – President Bush urges the Palestinian people to replace Yasser Arafat, head of the Palestinian Authority, stating that "when the Palestinians have new leaders, institutions and security arrangements, the U.S. will support the creation of a Palestinian state."
- June 25–27 – President Bush makes the ninth international trip of his presidency, travelling to Kananaskis, Alberta, Canada, where he attends the 28th G8 summit.
- June 29 – President Bush undergoes a colonoscopy at Bethesda Naval Hospital. Vice President Cheney serves as acting president for approximately two hours, under section 3 of the 25th Amendment.

== July ==
- July 3 – President Bush issues an executive order speeding up citizenship proceedings for non-citizens who have been serving in the U.S. military since the September 11 attacks.
- July 9 – Several blocks away from the New York Stock Exchange and Ground Zero, President Bush delivers a speech to a business group, indicating that an investigation into corporate wrongdoing should take place for the sake of both the US's economy and financial systems.
- July 10 – In a defense of the Homeland Security Department, President Bush calls it bipartisan and "an American idea that makes sense for all Americans."
- July 11 – In an appearance before the House Select Homeland Security Committee, Secretary of State Colin Powell, Secretary of Defense Donald Rumsfeld, Secretary of Treasury Paul O'Neill and Attorney General John Ashcroft confirm their support for the formation of the Homeland Security Department.
- July 16 – President Bush outlines a homeland security national strategy that includes standards on state driver licenses and detecting chemical, biological and nuclear weapons with the use of technology. Tom Ridge, the incumbent Homeland Security Director, touts the proposal as "the best way to protect America."
- July 17 – President Bush reports Vice President Cheney as doing "a heck of a good job" while defending Cheney in his first public comments on the ongoing investigation into Cheney's former company Halliburton Corp, saying the inquiry will "run its course."
- July 19 – President Bush meets with soldiers and their families and speaks with the still in Afghanistan 10th Mountain Division through satellite. Bush calls on the Senate to approve his request for a funding of the U.S. military, the largest since the Ronald Reagan presidency.
- July 20 – President Bush requests Congress hasten passing a corporate ethical standard enforcing bill and other areas such as forcing a fiscal restraint to avoid adding to the deficit so much that it will not be paid in the decades to come.
- July 21 – President Bush announces Presidential Medal of Freedom recipients.
- July 22 – President Bush travels to the Argonne National Laboratory and speaks with employees about the value of new technology to national security and the Homeland Security Department.
- July 24 – President Bush formally approves Yucca Mountain as the high level nuclear waste dump of the US.
- July 31 – The White House reports President Bush as having opposed Harken Energy Corporation establishing an oversea subsidiary in the Cayman Islands when he was on the board of directors. Bush repeated the claim when asked about the subsidiary.

== August ==
- August 1 – Bush expresses outrage over the deaths of five Americans killed during a Hebrew University terrorist bombing, but maintains peace in the Middle East is attainable.
- August 2 – The White House announces Bush's attendance on the upcoming first anniversary of the September 11 attacks.
- August 5 – Bush administration officials confirm Bush attended a meeting with top advisors where General Tommy Franks detailed the status of a possible attack on Iraq.
- August 8 – The Bush administration responds to a defiant speech on the part of Saddam Hussein, who boasted a US attack on Iraq would be doomed, with an aide saying, "The regime in Baghdad knows what it has to do. It must live up to its obligations to disarm that it agreed to in 1991."
- August 10 – Bush announces he will meet with American workers during the following week to evaluate the US's economic situation.
- August 13 – Bush speaks at an economic forum with the purpose of reassuring Americans of his attentiveness to the economy, him confidently stating the economy is recovering.
- August 14 – Bush calls on Congress to prevent spending and swears he will preserve the fiscal health of the US during an appearance at the Iowa State Fair.
- August 15 – Bush asserts the homeland security bill in the Senate as leaving his administration with its "hands tied" during a Mount Rushmore, South Dakota speech.
- August 16 – Bush says he will use the newest technology to come to a conclusion on how to resolve the Saddam Hussein situation while speaking to reporters.
- August 22 – Bush announces a plan to permit logging in national forests, which he said would prevent wildfire threats.
- August 24 – Bush calls on Congress to pass his Homeland Security plan when members return from their recess.
- August 30 – Bush gives praise for both the Major League Baseball players and owners for working out an agreement to avoid a strike.
- August 31 – Bush requests Americans become involved in community service and make the following month one of service.

== September ==
- September 9 – In Detroit, Michigan, Bush meets with Prime Minister of Canada Jean Chrétien.
- September 11 – On the anniversary of the September 11 attacks, Bush delivers a speech reflecting on how those affected by the incident had been since it occurred.
- September 12 – President Bush urges the United Nations to compel Iraq to agree with the weapons of mass destruction directives made by the Security Council.
- September 13 – Minister of Foreign Affairs Naji Sabri calls Bush's speech from the previous day "a lot of anti-Iraq propaganda" devoid of proof that Iraq harbored weapons of mass destruction.
- September 14 – In his weekly address, Bush requests the U.N. boost their efforts to handle Saddam Hussein's continued disregard for the resolutions of the United Nations.
- September 16 – President Bush delivers an economic address at Sears Manufacturing in Davenport, Iowa during the morning. President Bush gives an endorsement of Jim Nussle in his congressional campaign in a speech at the Mississippi Valley Fairgrounds in Davenport, Iowa during the afternoon.
- September 17 – President Bush unveils the We the People, Our Documents, and White House forum initiatives in the Rose Garden during the morning.
- September 18 – President Bush meets with congressional leaders for discussions on Iraq and domestic policies in the Oval Office during the morning.
- September 20 – A report by the Bush administration is released outlining preemptive and aggressive action against both known terrorist groups and hostile states in a change in the national security of the US.
- September 27 – President Bush gives a speech supporting the Defense Appropriations Bill and Congress taking action on it at the Adam's Mark Hotel in Denver, Colorado during the morning.
- September 28 – President Bush delivers an address favorable of a homeland security bill at the Phoenix Civic Plaza in Phoenix, Arizona during the afternoon.
- September 30 – President Bush issues a statement on the death of Patsy Mink. President Bush announces his intent to nominate Phillip Merrill for President of the Export-Import Bank of the United States and appoint Fidel Alfonso Vargas of California for Member of the Commission on Presidential Scholars.

== October ==
- October 7 – In a speech delivered in Cincinnati, Ohio, Bush explains his disagreements with Saddam Hussein's regime and advocated for the disarming of Iraqi forces.
- October 9 – A federal judge orders a temporary restraining order to resolve a labor dispute between the US and Asia which cost the US$2 billion a day.
- October 11 – The Senate approves a resolution authorizing President Bush to use military force in Iraq in the event that Saddam Hussein declines to turn over weapons of mass destruction as per the requirements of resolutions crafted by the United Nations in a 77–23 vote.
- October 12 – Bush calls on Congress to pass a terrorism insurance bill during his weekly radio address.
- October 14 – Bush comments on the weekend attacks in Indonesia, linking them to the attack on US Marines in Kuwait and a French tanker off Yemen.
- October 16 – Bush signs a resolution approved by Congress allowing him to go to war with Iraq.
- October 19 – Bush offers sympathies to Australians after the past weekend's Bali nightclub bombings, declaring the US and Australia will collaborate against terrorism.
- October 31 – President Bush delivers a speech at the Barnett Center of the Northern State University in Aberdeen, South Dakota during the morning. President Bush gives an address at the South Bend Regional Airport in South Bend, Indiana during the afternoon. President Bush issues a proclamation declaring November 2002 as National Alzheimer's Disease Awareness Month.

== November ==
- November 2 – Bush begins a 10-day campaign tour to aid Republicans in keeping their positions in Congress as well as helping his brother Jeb Bush remain Governor of Florida.
- November 4 – Bush endorses Jim Talent in his senatorial bid.
- November 8 – Bush made a statement regarding the UN Security Council Resolution 1441, which declared a "final opportunity" for Iraq to disarm the regime of Saddam Hussein repeatedly used by the British Prime Minister Tony Blair following his election on Blair's behalf, when he entered office at 10 Downing Street, London in May 1997.
- November 15 – Bush administration officials say President Bush can nominate Tom Ridge to head the Homeland Security department at earliest the following week.
- November 19 – Bush leaves Washington for Prague ahead of a scheduled meeting with leaders of NATO and partnering countries.
- November 20 – Bush and President of the Czech Republic Václav Havel hold a joint news conference, where Bush says the US will lead a "coalition of the willing" if Hussein continues refusing to disarm.
- November 25 – United States Department of Homeland Security is established.
- November 28 – Bush releases a statement on the Kenya attacks, condemning them "in the strongest possible terms" and offering condolences to the families of victims.
- November 29 – President Bush cuts civilian federal employee pay raises and cites the war on terrorism as being threatened by them being bestowed the full pay hike.
- November 30 – Bush calls on Americans to be inspired by the Thanksgiving holiday and become serviceable to "those in need."

== December ==
- December 4 – The New York Times discloses the Bush administration as having restored the allocation of bonuses in money for roughly 2,000 politically appointed federal workers, reversing a policy from the administration of Bill Clinton.
- December 5 – First Lady Laura Bush unveils the Christmas decorations at the White House for the second time.
- December 6 – Treasury Secretary Paul O'Neill and economic advisor Lawrence B. Lindsey resign per request by the White House.
- December 9 – Officials of the Bush administration confirm John W. Snow as the president's choice to replace O'Neill as Treasury Secretary.
- December 10 – Bush introduces William Donaldson as his choice for chairman of the Securities and Exchange Commission.
- December 11 – Bush issues an executive order, creating the nine-member President's Commission on the Postal Service.
- December 12 – Bush rebukes comments by Senate Majority Leader Trent Lott while speaking in Philadelphia.
- December 13 – Bush announces his intent for the smallpox inoculation of 500,000 military personnel on the frontline.
- December 16 – The White House announces Joe Allbaugh will resign as Federal Emergency Management Agency Director.
- December 17 – Bush reveals plans to begin the first phase of a system meant to protect the US from ballistic missile attack within two years. The White House announces Nick Calio will step down as President Bush's representative on Capital Hill the following month.
- December 20 – Bush responds to the Iraqi arms declaration from the previous day, calling it "a disappointing day for those who long for peace."
- December 21 – Bush receives a smallpox vaccine along with 500,000 ordered to receive the same treatment, White House Jeanie Mamo reporting him as being "fine."
- December 22 – The White House updates Bush as feeling "great" in relation to his vaccine.
- December 24 – On Christmas Eve, President Bush calls members of the military to thank them for their service.
- December 28 – In his radio address, Bush declares 2002 a successful year for America, citing a growing economy and continued battling of terrorism both domestic and abroad.
- December 30 – The lawsuit against Bush for his withdrawal from the 1972 Anti-Ballistic Missile Treaty brought upon him by 32 Congress members is dismissed by a federal judge.

== See also ==
- Timeline of the George W. Bush presidency, for an index of the Bush presidency timeline articles

U.S. presidential administration timelines
Preceded by Bush presidency (2001)	Bush presidency (2002)	Succeeded by Bush presidency (2003)
