= Timeline of the George W. Bush presidency (2001) =

The following is a timeline of the presidency of George W. Bush from his inauguration as the 43rd president of the United States on January 20, 2001, to December 31, 2001.

== January ==
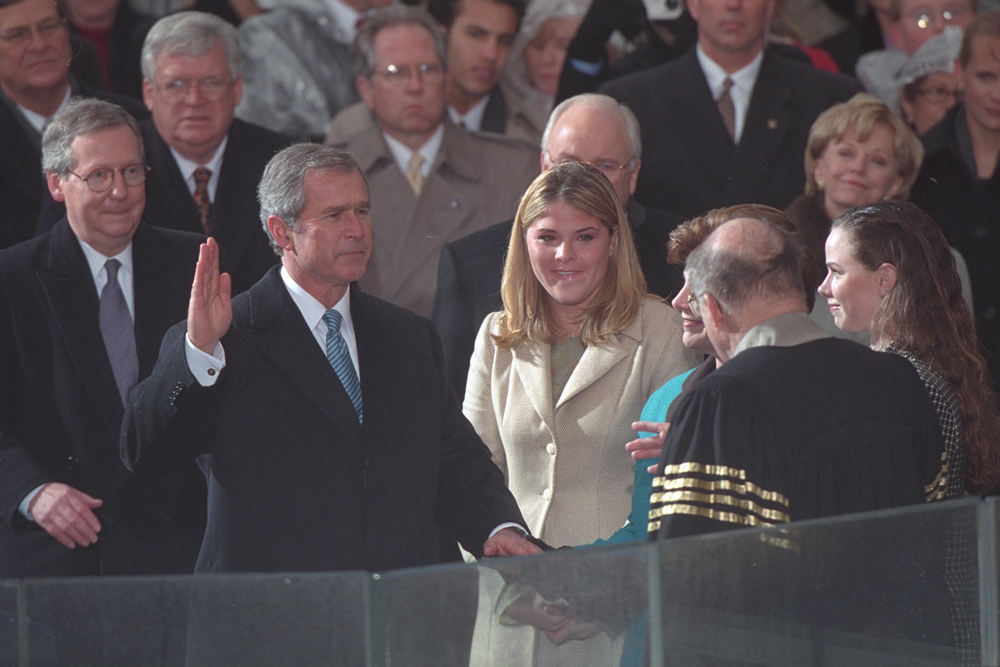
George W. Bush is inaugurated as the 43rd president of the United States

- January 20 – George W. Bush's presidency begins with his inauguration at the United States Capitol in Washington, D.C.; the oath of office is administered by Chief Justice William Rehnquist. In his inaugural address, the president pledges to "work to build a single nation of justice and opportunity." He also declares, "The enemies of liberty and our country should make no mistake. America remains engaged in the world, by history and by choice, shaping a balance of power that favors freedom."
- January 22 – President Bush hosts the swearing in ceremony for new White House staff, saying in his remarks that they are all there for the same reason, which he defines as "making progress". Bush notes the prayer of John Adams as being inscribed in a mantle piece in the White House.
- January 22 – President Bush reinstates the ban on aid to international groups performing or counseling on abortion (initiated in the early 1980s by President Ronald Reagan, but lapsed during Bill Clinton's presidency).
- January 24 – President Bush meets with congressional leaders during his sixth meeting with legislators since taking office for discussions on a wide range of issues with the intent of surpassing expectations.
- January 24 – Roderick R. Paige is sworn in as the 7th United States Secretary of Education in the Barnard Auditorium at the Department of Education during the afternoon.
- January 26 – Donald Rumsfeld is sworn in as the 21st United States Secretary of Defense in the Oval Office during the afternoon.
- January 29 – President Bush creates the Office of Faith Based and Community Initiatives, which will work to ease regulations on religious charities and promote grass-roots efforts to tackle community issues such as aid to the poor and disadvantaged.
- January 29 – President Bush establishes the National Energy Policy Development Group—composed of Vice President Dick Cheney, nine cabinet-level officials, and four other senior administration officials—and charges it with the task of developing a long-range plan for the meeting the nation's energy requirements.
- January 31 – President Bush meets with Catholic Church leaders in the Indian Treaty Room at the Dwight D. Eisenhower Executive Office Building during the afternoon.

== February ==
- February 1 – President Bush announces a $1.025 billion, five-year plan to assist disabled persons in gaining greater independence while seated at a wheelchair-accessible podium and surrounded by an audience of persons with disabilities and their supporters.
- February 4 – President Bush has a meeting with Congressional Democrats during their annual retreat, later telling reporters, "These are professionals who want to serve their nation."
- February 5 – President Bush appears at the White House with four families he describes as potential beneficiaries for his new tax rate system, as he launches a week of lobbying for his tax cut proposal.
- February 6 – President Bush makes several public appearances in support of a tax relief within Washington and northern Virginia. He also acknowledges former President Ronald Reagan's 90th birthday with a public statement praising him.
- February 7 – A man later identified as Robert Pickett fires gunshots at the White House in an attempt to assassinate President Bush, who was in the building at the time. Bush was not harmed in the incident.
- February 8 – President Bush conveys the blueprint for his $1.6 trillion, 10-year tax cut proposal to Congress.
- February 13 – President Bush telephones Prime Minister of Japan Yoshiro Mori to apologize for the unintended sinking by a U.S. nuclear submarine of a Japanese fishing ship with high school students aboard after a four-day search.
- February 16 – President Bush makes the first international trip of his presidency, travelling to San Cristóbal, Guanajuato, Mexico, where he discusses trade, energy, migration, educational opportunities, and the battle against the illegal drug trade with President Vicente Fox.
- February 16 – American and British military aircraft attack targets in southern Iraq, including command centers, radar and communications centers, to enforce the Iraqi no-fly zones.

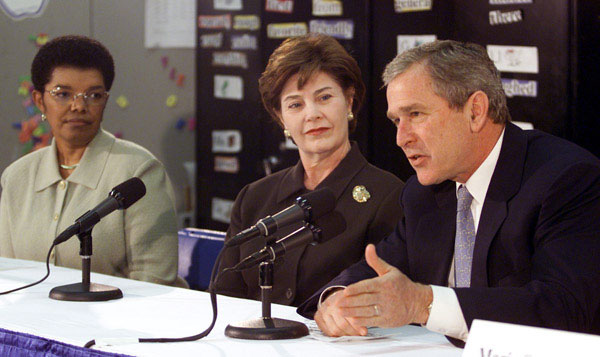
President George W. Bush talks to an education roundtable with Laura Bush and Rosa Smith, Superintendent of the Columbus School district at Sullivant Elementary School in Columbus, Ohio on February 20, 2001.

- February 20 – After the indictment of Robert Philip Hanssen for allegedly passing classified documents to Russia, President Bush reads a statement to reporters traveling with him on Air Force One, referencing the event with the line that it was "a difficult day for those who love our country."
- February 21 – President Bush reports the budget for the following year will include federal support of another $1.6 billion for both primary and secondary education programs.
- February 22 – During a press conference, President Bush states his intent to return money to the taxpayers after completion of funding priorities and paying a portion of the national debt. He also declines to answer questions pertaining to former President Clinton's controversial pardons, saying, "it's time to go forward."
- February 24 – President Bush promises funding for the most essential national priorities that still restrain spending during his weekly radio address.
- February 26 – President Bush hosts a session of the National Governors Association annual winter meeting. During his prepared public remarks prior to the closed-door discussion, the president envisions that, "When the history of this administration is written, it will be said the nation's governors had a faithful friend in the White House." He also announces his "new federalism" initiative.
- February 27 – President Bush delivers an address before a joint session of the members of Congress outlining his administration goals.
- February 28 – Vice President Cheney says the president's budget plan leaves room for more in the budget post the tax cut, dismissing claims of otherwise as "wrong, factually untrue" while speaking to manufacturing executives.

== March ==
- March 6 – President Bush addresses questions from reporters on the subjects of his Chicago visit, tax relief legislation, and Vice President Cheney in the Executive Conference Room at the Chicago Mercantile Exchange.
- March 6 – President Bush delivers an afternoon address to the Chicago Mercantile Exchange in Chicago, Illinois reflecting on his activities since arriving in the city and promoting the benefits of his tax relief plan.
- March 6 – President Bush issues a message on the observance of Eid al-Adha, saying in part that those celebrating the holiday will "honor the great sacrifice and devotion of Abraham as recognized by Judaism, Christianity, and Islam. By educating others about your religious traditions, you enrich the lives of others in your local communities."
- March 6 – In a letter to congressional leaders, President Bush submits a report "on progress toward a negotiated settlement of the Cyprus question covering the period December 1, 2000-January 31, 2001."
- March 6 – President Bush transmits a semiannual report detailing the payments by American persons to Cuba due to the provision of telecommunications services pursuant to Department of the Treasury specific licenses to Congress in a message.
- March 6 – President Bush states his intent to nominate John D. Negroponte for US Ambassador to the United Nations.
- March 7 – President Bush meets with President of South Korea Kim Dae-jung where the president asserts he views North Korea as a threat.
- March 8 – The House of Representatives passes the cornerstone of President Bush's tax-relief plan, which the president calls a "victory" for American families, people and entrepreneurs.
- March 12 – President Bush speaks at a Panama City, Florida Youth Activities Center, saying his administration wants to make sure service members are housed properly during their service and claims to have enough money to accomplish this goal. Bush also announces his plans for the nomination of Paula J. Dobriansky as Under Secretary of State for Global Affairs and Dale Cabaniss for Chairman of the Federal Labor Relations Authority.
- March 13 – President Bush signs a bill designating a newly built courthouse in Boston, Massachusetts as the "John Joseph Moakley Federal Courthouse" in honor of retiring congressman Joe Moakley. Bush meets with Congress, reversing a campaign pledge to impose mandatory emission reductions on carbon dioxide on US power plants.
- March 15 – President Bush sends a letter to Capitol Hill outlining his views on campaign reform in hopes of reaching an agreement.
- March 16 – Officials at the Pentagon announce that the Bush administration will let a March 16 deadline for notifying Congress of any intent to begin building a radar facility on Alaska's Shemya Island pass, as it continues to examine its options with regard to national missile defense.
- March 20 – President Bush meets with Prime Minister of Israel Ariel Sharon, their first meeting since both took office.
- March 27 – Speaking in Kalamazoo, Michigan, President Bush takes issue with a Democratic proposal in Congress for an immediate tax rebate, stating that the American economy needing more than a one-time tax cut.
- March 29 – The Bush administration announces its decision to abandon ratification of the Kyoto Protocol, an international treaty signed by 180 countries to reduce global warming that set limits on industrial emissions.

== April ==
- April 1 – A U.S. spy plane flying over the South China Sea is forced to make an emergency landing on Chinese soil after being clipped by a Chinese fighter jet.
- April 3 – Outside the White House, President Bush stresses his administration has tried to prevent the US spy plane-Chinese jet collision from being "an international incident."
- April 4 – The Miami Herald and USA Today release an in-depth review of the 2000 presidential election Florida. The review shows that even if Democratic candidate Al Gore had succeeded in getting the recounts he wanted, President Bush would have won Florida by 1,665 votes.
- April 6 – President Bush reports the China-detained US service members as being "just fine" during a Virginia meeting with business leaders. President Bush receives a letter from the wife of the Chinese pilot who criticizes him for not apologizing for the collision.
- April 8 – President Bush sends a somber letter to the wife of the Chinese pilot.
- April 9 – President Bush's proposed 2002 federal budget is submitted to Congress.
- April 12 – President Bush announces a hardened stance by American representatives while talking with Chinese officials in regards to the US and Chinese aircraft collision.
- April 16 – President Bush gives a speech to the United States Chamber of Commerce, calling it "tax day."
- April 20–22 – President Bush makes the second international trip of his presidency, travelling to Quebec City, Quebec, Canada, where he attends the 3rd Summit of the Americas.
- April 24 – During an interview aired on ABC's Good Morning America, President Bush pledges that the U.S. military would do "whatever it took" to defend Taiwan if it were ever attacked by China.

== May ==
- May 1 – President Bush calls for a "new framework" for national defense, including a missile defense system to shield the whole country against incoming missiles, during a speech at the National Defense University. He also reiterates his view that the 30-year-old ABM Treaty with Russia should be scrapped.
- May 10 – President Bush announces the appointment of John P. Walters as director of the White House Office of National Drug Control Policy during a White House ceremony.
- May 11 – During a news conference, President Bush says he agrees with Attorney General John Ashcroft's delaying of the execution of Oklahoma City bombing perpetrator Timothy McVeigh for another month.
- May 17 – President Bush releases his administration's energy strategy. The plan, developed by a task force led by Vice President Cheney, came under immediate attack by congressional Democrats who said it offered no immediate relief for U.S. consumers.
- May 18 – President Bush signs two executive orders, the first hastening energy projects becoming available online, and the second keeping regulators focused on the impact of energy in decision making while in Conestoga, Pennsylvania.
- May 19 – In his weekly radio address, President Bush says energy and environment protection can be done simultaneously.
- May 20 – President Bush delivers the commencement address at Notre Dame University.
- May 30 – President Bush gives a speech at the Giant Forest Museum in Sequoia National Park, California during the morning.
- May 31 – President Bush makes a joint appearance with University of Nebraska 2001 NCAA Women's Volleyball Champions in the Rose Garden during the morning. President Bush delivers an address to the Los Angeles World Affairs Council at Century Plaza in Los Angeles, California during the afternoon.

== June ==
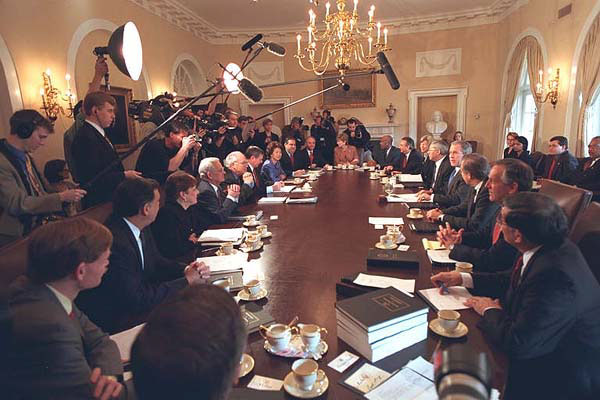
President Bush meeting with his administration's cabinet on June 9, 2001.

- June 1 – President Bush releases a statement condemning the Dolphinarium discotheque massacre in Tel Aviv, Israel, calling it a "heinous terrorist attack".
- June 2 – In his weekly radio address, President Bush says Congress will be sending him a bill that over the next 11 years will reduce federal income tax by $1.35 trillion.
- June 4 – During an appearance at the Everglades National Park, President Bush nominates Fran Mainella to lead the National Park Service.
- June 5 – President Bush requests an investigation by the US International Trade Commission on whether steel import restrictions are needed.
- June 7 – President Bush signs the Economic Growth and Tax Relief Reconciliation Act into law.
- June 8 – President Bush appears at an Iowa farm, where he insists tax relief is impending.
- June 9 – President Bush holds a bilateral meeting with the Prime Minister of Bulgaria Ivan Kostov.
- June 12–16 – President Bush makes the third international trip of his presidency.
  - June 12–13 – President Bush meets with King Juan Carlos I and Prime Minister José María Aznar in Madrid, Spain.
  - June 13–14 – President Bush attends the NATO Summit Meeting in Brussels, Belgium; he also meets with Belgium's King Albert II and Prime Minister Guy Verhofstadt.
  - June 14–15 – President Bush attends the U.S.-EU Summit Meeting in Gothenburg, Sweden; he also meets with Sweden's King Carl XVI and Prime Minister Göran Persson.
  - June 15 – From Sweden, President Bush announces that the U.S. military will cease Vieques bombing exercises due to residents not wanting "us there."
  - June 15–16 – President Bush makes a state visit to Poland. After meeting with President Aleksander Kwaśniewski in Warsaw, the president called upon all European nations to cast aside their political divisions and become "truly united, truly democratic and truly diverse."
  - June 16 – President Bush attends a trilateral meeting in Kranj, Slovenia, with Slovenian Prime Minister Janez Drnovšek and Russian President Vladimir Putin.
- June 28 – President Bush announces conservation efforts that include a $87.5 million federal grant while appearing at the Department of Energy.
- June 30 – President Bush meets with Japanese Prime Minister Junichiro Koizumi at Camp David.

== July ==
- July 3 – President Bush announces he will soon decide his decision on whether to allow federal funding for embryonic stem cell research.
- July 5 – President Bush nominates Robert Mueller for FBI Director in a ceremony. Bush calls President of China Jiang Zemin over US academic detentions.
- July 10 – President Bush requests a relaxed system of immigration during a speech at Ellis Island.
- July 12 – President Bush requests Congress deliver a Medicare expansion and unveils a plan directed toward prescription drugs for seniors being reduced in price.
- July 15 – President Bush is reported by a White House spokesman as being satisfied with the recent missile test's success.
- July 18–24 – President Bush makes the fourth international trip of his presidency.
  - July 18–20 – President Bush visits the United Kingdom, where he meets with Prime Minister Tony Blair and Queen Elizabeth II.
  - July 20–24 – President Bush attends the 27th G8 summit at Genoa, Italy; meets with Italy's Prime Minister Silvio Berlusconi and President Carlo Azeglio Ciampi in Rome, and has an audience with Pope John Paul II at Castel Gandolfo.
  - July 22 – President Bush says he and Russian President Vladimir Putin have agreed to linking U.S. intentions for the construction of a missile defense shield to plans on reducing nuclear stockpiles.
  - July 24 – President Bush gives a speech to American military personnel at Camp Bondsteel in Kosovo.
- July 20 – The Senate confirms Roger Gregory, Richard F. Cebull, and Sam Haddon, Bush's first three judicial nominees.
- July 26 – President Bush notes the 11th anniversary of the Americans with Disabilities Act of 1990, saying in part, "I am proud that my father saw the need for a comprehensive law to liberate the energies and talents of people with disabilities, and who worked with the Congress to make the ADA a reality."
- July 27 – President Bush delivers a speech on the economy and taxes in the Presidential Hall at the Eisenhower Office Building.
- July 31 – A Bush administration backed comprehensive ban on cloning is passed in the morning hours by the House of Representatives in a 249–178 vote. Bush signs an executive order making federal agencies purchase energy efficient applies a requirement, saying beforehand that he hopes to eliminate "energy vampires" such as battery and cell phone chargers. Bush is formally given the National Commission on Federal Election Reform's report during a Rose Garden ceremony.

== August ==
- August 1 – President Bush announces there has been a shared view on "how to get a patients' bill of rights out of the House of Representatives" in the James S. Brady Briefing Room.
- August 2 – President Bush releases a statement commending "the bold leadership and hard work of Speaker Hastert, Congressman Norwood, Congressman Fletcher, and others for their efforts to make patient protections a reality for all Americans after years of gridlock" and stating his intent to seek "better health care for every American."
- August 3 – During a speech on the Rose Garden, the president identifies the successes of his administration as the first tax cut "in a generation", education legislation movement, homelessness aid, and a bill of rights for patients, detailing the agenda for his administration for the upcoming fall as disadvantage individual assistance, controlled spending, and the protection of "Medicare, Social Security and our armed forces … and the American taxpayers."
- August 4 – President Bush speaks about Medicaid during his weekly radio address.
- August 9 – In an address to the nation, President Bush outlines the federal government's new policy regarding funding for stem cell research. The policy allows for funding of research on existing embryonic stem cell lines, but prohibits funds from going towards creating new stem cell lines that result in the destruction of embryos.
- August 24 – President Bush announces the appointment of General Richard Myers as Chairman of the Joint Chiefs of Staff and of General Peter Pace as Vice Chairman.
- August 25 – President Bush gives members of the White House press corps a tour of his Prairie Chapel Ranch near Crawford, Texas, which will serve as the Western White House during his presidency.
- August 29 – President Bush addresses the 83rd national convention of the American Legion in San Antonio, Texas. In his speech on the nation's defense priorities, the president mentions health care for veterans and military retirees.
- August 30 – President Bush announces his nomination of Roy L. Austin for United States Ambassador to Trinidad and Tobago.

== September ==
- September 3 – President Bush spends his first Labor Day in office in Green Bay, Wisconsin, visiting a carpenters union local, and in Detroit, Michigan, joining in a picnic at Teamsters headquarters.
- September 5 – President Bush meets with President of Mexico Vicente Fox at the White House.
- September 7 – President Bush meets with congressional leaders for talk on the previous month's unemployment numbers. The August 2001 unemployment rate is 4.9 percent, up from 4.5 percent in July, and the highest since September 1997.
- September 10 – President Bush visits Justina Road Elementary School in Jacksonville, Florida as part of a campaign to press Congress to agree with his education plan; his brother Governor of Florida Jeb Bush also in attendance.
- September 11
  - The September 11 attacks occur, as Al-Qaeda terrorists hijack four commercial jets and crash them into the World Trade Center in New York City, the Pentagon in Arlington County, Virginia, and a field in Shanksville, Pennsylvania. With 2,996 people killed, and over 6,000 others injured, it is the worst attack on American soil since the 1941 attack on Pearl Harbor.
  - President Bush attends an education event at Emma E. Booker Elementary School in Sarasota, Florida and is reading with students in a classroom when he is informed of the unfolding attacks. Following brief remarks at the school, the president travels to Barksdale Air Force Base in Louisiana and then to Offutt Air Force Base in Nebraska before returning to Washington in the late afternoon.
  - Addressing the nation from the Oval Office 12 hours after the attacks, the president speaks passionately of "disbelief, terrible sadness and quiet, unyielding anger." He also pledges that the federal government would bring the persons responsible for the hijacking to justice.
- September 13 – President Bush has a telephone call with Mayor of New York Rudy Giuliani and Governor of New York George Pataki.
- September 13 – President Bush proclaims September 14, 2001 as a national day of prayer and remembrance for the victims of the September 11 terrorist attacks.
- September 14 – President Bush attends, and speaks during a memorial service at Washington National Cathedral. Memorial services are held across the country and around the world.
- September 14 – President Bush travels to New York City, where he views the damage from the September 11 attack and addresses rescue and recovery workers at the World Trade Center site.
- September 15 – Seeking to create an international coalition against terrorism, the president phones President of Mexico Vicente Fox, Prime Minister of Spain José María Aznar, and President of Pakistan Pervez Musharraf.
- September 17 – President Bush identifies Osama bin Laden as the "prime suspect" in the September 11 attacks, and says the United States wants him captured while speaking to reporters at The Pentagon.
- September 17 – Immediately after opening the hunt for Osama bin Laden, President Bush visits the Islamic Center of Washington, where he speaks against the harassment of Muslims living in the U.S., and of the need to respect Islam.
- September 18 – President Bush signs Congress Authorization for Use of Military Force Against Terrorists bill granting him authority for the use of United States armed forces against terrorists responsible for The September 11 attacks.
- September 18 – President of France Jacques Chirac meets with President Bush at the White House, promising France would support the U.S. in battling terrorism.
- September 20 – President Bush delivers an address to a joint session of Congress with British Prime Minister Tony Blair, Rudy Giuliani, and George Pataki in attendance. He thanks the people of the world for their outpouring support for the U.S. following the September 11 attacks, and declares, "Our grief has turned to anger; and anger to resolution. Whether we bring our enemies to justice, or bring justice to our enemies, justice will be done." During his speech, the President demands that the Taliban regime in Afghanistan surrender all leaders of Al-Qaeda to the United States, protect foreign nationals working in Afghanistan, release foreigners unjustly imprisoned, and close terrorist training camps. He also announces the creation of the Department of Homeland Security, a cabinet-level position charged with coordinating national security, headed by Pennsylvania Governor Tom Ridge. He also stresses that the country was at war with "a fringe form of Islamic extremism," and not with Islam or Muslims.
- September 22 – President Bush signs an emergency aid package into law intended to help the US airline industry, providing it with "$5 billion in direct federal aid and $10 billion in loan guarantees" in the aftermath of layoffs in the tens of thousands since the September 11 attacks.
- September 24 – President Bush announces he has frozen the U.S. assets of 27 entities with links to terrorism via the signing of an executive order.
- September 25 – President Bush pitches an anti-terrorism law package, calling it a fair and legal response to the September 11 attacks.
- September 27 – President Bush requests that governors across the U.S. use the National Guard to boost security in their state airports until more cohesive steps can be proceeded with.

== October ==
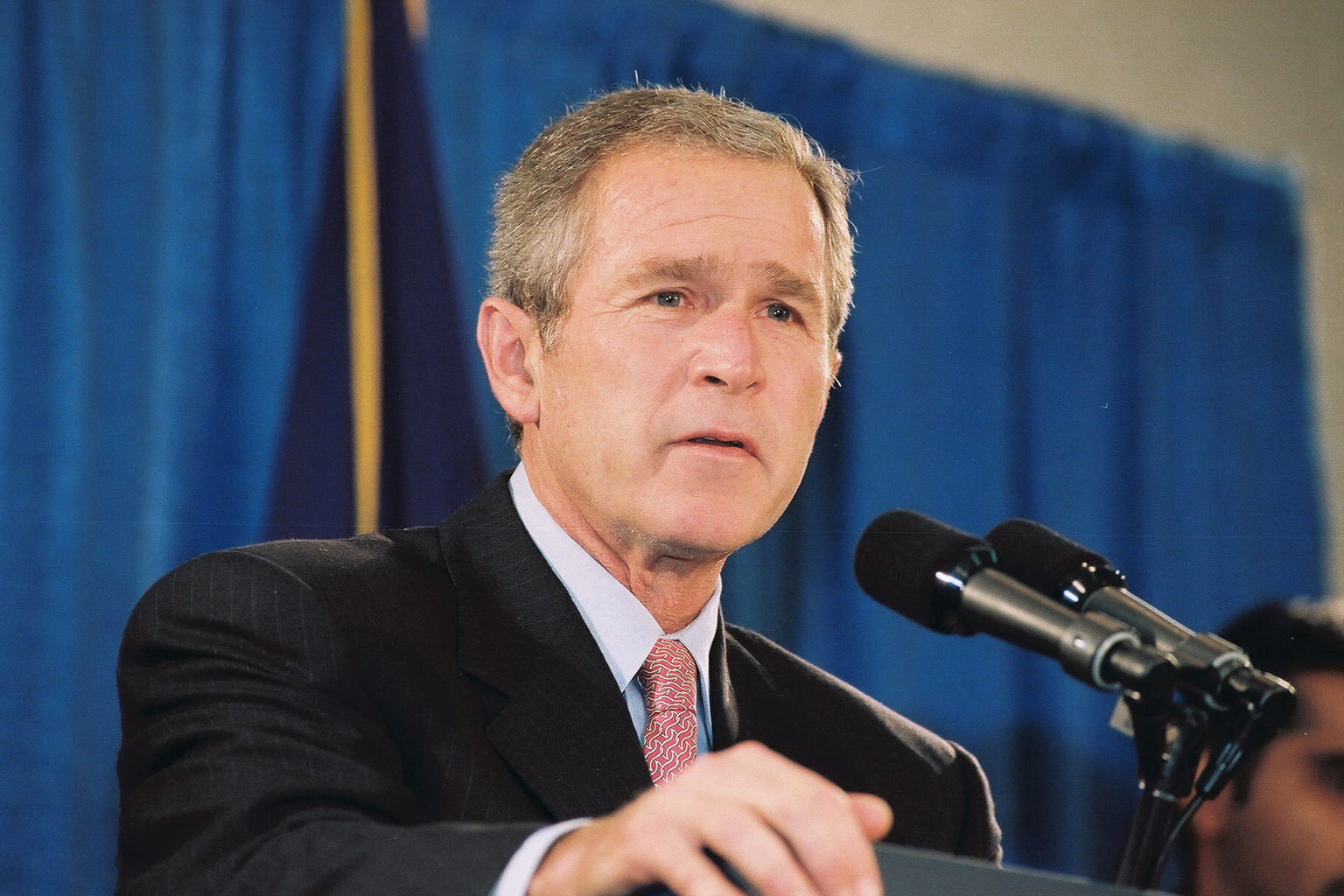
President Bush outlines the path of the U.S. in the aftermath of the September 11 attacks while talking to FEMA employees, October 1, 2001

- October 2 – President Bush meets with lawmakers to discuss a stimulating of the economy, the White House and Congress agreeing to an $18.4 billion boost in military spending and $4 billion increase in funding for education than originally requested by the White House.
- October 3 – A proposal compromising making airport screeners federal employees is offered by the Bush administration. Secretary of Transportation Norman Mineta meets with both Democratic and Republican senators.
- October 4 – President Bush announces an emergency unemployment package while appearing at the Labor Department.
- October 7 – Speaking from the White House Treaty Room, President Bush announces the commencement of military action in Afghanistan (code-named Operation Enduring Freedom) in response to the September 11 attacks.
- October 9 – President Bush sends Congress a formal notification on his choice to deploy troops and forces to Afghanistan for combat operations.
- October 11 – President Bush holds a presidential news conference. He had this message for the Taliban: "If you cough him up and his people today that we'll reconsider what we're doing to your country. You still have a second chance. Just bring him in, and bring his leaders and lieutenants and other thugs and criminals with him." and "Our focus is on Afghanistan, and the terrorist network hiding in Afghanistan, right now. But, as well, we're looking for al Qaeda cells around the world. If we find an al Qaeda cell operating, we will urge the host country to bring them to justice. And we're having some progress, we're making progress". and was also asked about Iraq where he stated "There's no question that the leader of Iraq is an evil man. After all, he gassed his own people. We know he's been developing weapons of mass destruction. And I think it's in his advantage to allow inspectors back in his country to make sure that he's conforming to the agreement he made, after he was soundly trounced in the Gulf War. And so we're watching him very carefully".
- October 12 – President Bush admits terrorist attacks can occur to the U.S., but that the country will not be taken down by them.
- October 13 – President Bush says the U.S. and Britain's airstrikes in Afghanistan accomplished "goals of the first phase of the campaign" during his radio address.
- October 14 – The Department of Health and Human Services says the president will give a recommendation to Congress for them to allocate $1.5 billion to help the department.
- October 14 – The White House rejects a conditional Taliban government offer to discuss giving Osama bin Laden to a third country for trial if the U.S. provides evidence of bin Laden's involvement in the September 11 attacks.
- October 15 – President Bush warns Americans to lookout for suspicious letters and packages amid growing concerns about anthrax exposure, after Senate Majority Leader Tom Daschle's office receives a letter tainted with anthrax spores. Persons in Florida and New York have already tested positive for the frequently fatal bacteria.
- October 18–21 – President Bush makes the fifth international trip of his presidency, travelling to Shanghai, China, where he attends the 13th APEC summit meetings.
- October 23 – President Bush asserts that he will be fine in returning to the White House after anthrax is found at a White House mail screening offsite mail facility.
- October 25 – Secretary of Defense Donald Rumsfeld announces the US is ceasing tests on a ballistic missile defense system while the administration and Russia undergo further conversing in relation to the 29-year missile pact.
- October 26 – President Bush signs the USA Patriot Act into law.
- October 30 – With the crowd at New York City's Yankee Stadium chanting "U-S-A, U-S-A", President Bush throws out the ceremonial first pitch to open game three of the 2001 World Series between the Arizona Diamondbacks and the New York Yankees.

== November ==
- November 1 – President Bush releases proposals to improve the 1972 Biological and Toxin Weapons Convention accord.
- November 1 – President Bush releases a statement in response to the House passing aviation security legislation, praising the decision and noting that many of the proposals of the administration were implemented.
- November 2 – President Bush attends a reception for the United Service Organizations in the East Room during the afternoon.
- November 3 – President Bush calls the recent anthrax attacks a "biological attack" and assures Americans the perpetrators will be found during his weekly radio address.
- November 9 – President Bush meets with Prime Minister of India Atal Bihari Vajpayee at the White House, Bush later publicly disclosing that the two spoke of an Afghanistan after the Taliban were gone that allowed for the country to both "survive and move forward."
- November 10 – President Bush addresses a session of the General Assembly of the United Nations in New York City. He asks the United Nations for help in combating terrorism, and also pledges that the U.S. is prepared to take the fight against terrorism—acting alone if need be—to any place in the world that harbors terrorists.
- November 11 – President Bush attends the Veterans Day Prayer Breakfast at the Park Avenue Seventh Regiment Armory in New York City during the morning.
- November 11 – President Bush releases a statement expressing his favor of the choice by trade ministers to admit the People's Republic of China and Taiwan into the World Trade Organization.
- November 12 – President Bush signs the Energy and Water Development Appropriations Act, 2002 into law. In a statement, President Bush says the bill provides funding for research projects, nonproliferation projects, water resources developments, and stockpile stewardship.
- November 13 – President Bush releases a statement on the Strategic Petroleum Reserve in which he cites it as essential to American energy security and outlines the significance of the SPR.
- November 19 – President Bush signs the Aviation and Transportation Security Act into law, creating the Transportation Security Administration.
- November 20 – President Bush renames the Department of Justice Main Building to the Robert F. Kennedy Department of Justice Building, in honor of the late U.S. Attorney General and Senator Robert F. Kennedy, during a ceremony on the 76th anniversary of his birth.
- November 24 – In his weekly address, the president comments that the September 11 attack perpetrators unintentionally gave the U.S. much to be grateful for.
- November 26 – During a Rose Garden appearance, the president calls the cloning of humans "morally wrong" and asserts the procedure should not be allowed.
- November 27 – President Bush and First Lady Laura Bush host a reception at the White House honoring the seven American recipients of the 2001 Nobel Prize.
- November 28 – President Bush delivers a speech to the Farmers Journal Corporation Convention on the economic stimulus at the J.W. Marriott in Washington, D.C.
- November 29 – President Bush tells a gathering of United States Attorneys at the Eisenhower Executive Office Building that their work can greatly enhance the security and safety of the American people.

== December ==
- December 1 – President Bush calls on Congress to approve a stimulus bill to help the US economy after weeks of delay.
- December 2 – President Bush meets with Prime Minister of Israel Ariel Sharon in the Oval Office.
- December 3 – First Lady Laura Bush unveils the Christmas decorations at the White House for the first time.
- December 5 – President Bush asserts killers attempting to intrude on the Middle East peace process must be "rout out" by President of the Palestinian National Authority Yasser Arafat during a news conference.
- December 7 – President Bush addresses the crew of the USS Enterprise at Norfolk, Virginia on the 60th anniversary of the attack on Pearl Harbor.
- December 11 – President Bush delivers a speech at The Citadel in Charleston, South Carolina, in which he relates that the war on terror has highlighted the need for a dramatically retooled military, armed with high-tech weapons and real-time intelligence, and calls for sweeping improvements in intelligence-gathering and military readiness to combat terror.
- December 13 – President Bush announces the United States will be withdrawing from the 1972 Antiballistic Missile Treaty signed with the Soviet Union, citing the treaty as preventing the US from developing "effective defenses."
- December 13 – The Bush administration releases a videotape in which Osama bin Laden recounts with delight the September 11 terrorist attacks against the United States.
- December 14 – During a White House photo opportunity with the Prime Minister of Thailand, Thaksin Shinawatra, the president refutes allegations that the tape of Osama bin Laden discussing the terror attacks was doctored, calling the suggestion "just a feeble excuse to provide weak support for an incredibly evil man."
- December 18 – In a meeting, President Bush tells congressional leaders of videotapes being within the content obtained from Afghanistan al Qaeda installations.
- December 20 – One hundred days after the September 11 attacks, the president announces the targeting of Umma Tameer-e-nau and Lashkar-e-Tayyiba, two organizations believed to be giving financial assistance to both terrorist and their respective groups.
- December 22 – President Bush celebrates the work of the 107th Congress in 2001, and conveys holiday greetings to the nation during his radio address.
- December 28 – Speaking to reporters at his ranch in Texas, the president foresees U.S. troops staying in Afghanistan for "a long period of time" despite being satisfied with the way they were progressing.
- December 31 – President Bush predicts 2002 will be a favorable year for America, citing the economy rebounding and success in the war against terrorism, while speaking with reporters at a store in Crawford, Texas.

== See also ==
- Timeline of the George W. Bush presidency, for an index of the Bush presidency timeline articles

U.S. presidential administration timelines
Preceded by Clinton presidency (2000–2001)	Bush presidency (2001)	Succeeded by Bush presidency (2002)
