= Timeline of the George W. Bush presidency (2006) =

The following is a timeline of the presidency of George W. Bush, from January 1, 2006 to December 31, 2006.

== January ==
- January 1 – President Bush visits Brooke Army Medical Center in San Antonio, Texas, during the afternoon.
- January 3 – President Bush discusses the Patriot Act in the Roosevelt Room during the afternoon.
- January 4 – President Bush delivers a speech on the war on terror at the Pentagon during the morning. Vice President Dick Cheney gives an address for the Heritage Foundation in Washington, D.C. during the afternoon. President Bush orders federal aid for North Dakota after declaring a major disaster exists within the state.
- January 5 – President Bush holds a meeting with Secretaries of State and Defense from prior administrations for discussions on Iraq in the Roosevelt Room during the morning. President Bush delivers an address at the U.S. Department of State in D.C. during the afternoon. President Bush signs the Violence Against Women and Department of Justice Reauthorization Act of 2005, reauthorizing FYs 2007-2011's Violence Against Women Act along with amending laws on crime and immigration.
- January 6 – President Bush delivers an economic address at the Hilton Chicago in Chicago, Illinois, during the morning.
- January 7 – President Bush discusses the economy and identifies his administration's economic agenda as retaining low taxes along with restraining federal spending during his radio address.
- January 9 – President Bush calls on the Senate to give a fair hearing to Alito during an appearance in the Rose Garden during the morning. President Bush reveals the membership of the Presidential Delegation to Astana, Kazakhstan scheduled to take place in the next two days.
- January 10 – President Bush delivers a speech at Omni Shoreham Hotel in D.C. during the morning. President Bush signs the Trafficking Victims Protection Reauthorization Act in Room 350 of the Eisenhower Executive Office Building during the afternoon. Bush declares the existence of a major disaster and orders federal aid in Oklahoma.
- January 11 – President Bush delivers an address on terrorism abroad and answers questions on the matter at the Kentucky International Convention Center in Louisville, Kentucky, during the afternoon. President Bush signs the U.S.-Bahrain Free Trade Agreement, which Bush states enhances the US's "bilateral relationship with a strategic friend and ally in the Middle East region". President Bush declares the existence of a major disaster and orders federal aid in Texas.
- January 12 – President Bush meets with small business owners and community leaders for a discussion at the New Orleans Metropolitan Convention Center And Visitors Bureau, Inc. in New Orleans, Louisiana, during the morning. President Bush delivers an address on Gulf Coast Reconstruction at St. Stanislaus College in Bay St. Louis, Mississippi, during the afternoon.
- January 13 – President Bush meets with Chancellor of Germany Angela Merkel at the White House and holds a joint press conference in the East Room during the morning. President Bush holds an Oval Office meeting on Central America Relief and efforts toward reconstruction during the afternoon.
- January 14 – President Bush speaks on his nomination of Samuel Alito for the Supreme Court and hope that he will be fairly evaluated by the Senate during his radio address.
- January 16 – President Bush delivers an address while attending the "Let Freedom Ring" celebration at the John F. Kennedy Center for the Performing Arts in D.C. during the afternoon. President Bush issues a statement on the death of Jaber Al-Ahmad Al-Sabah the previous day.
- January 17 – President Bush meets with Prime Minister of Belgium Guy Verhofstadt for a "wide-ranging discussion" in the Oval Office in the morning.
- January 18 – President Bush meets with "folks who know firsthand the brutality of Saddam Hussein" to discuss societal differences in the Roosevelt Room.
- January 19 – President Bush delivers a speech and then answers questions at JK Moving & Storage in Sterling, Virginia, during the morning. President Bush and First Lady Laura Bush hold a meeting on Gulf Coast recovery in Room 350 of the Eisenhower Executive Office Building during the afternoon.
- January 24 – President Bush meets with Prime Minister of Pakistan Shaukat Aziz in the Oval Office during the morning.
- January 25 – President Bush delivers a speech at the National Security Agency in Fort Meade, Maryland during the afternoon. President Bush announces the delegation to attend the inauguration of Jose Manuel Zelaya Rosales in two days.
- January 26 – President Bush holds a news conference in the morning. President Bush declares major disasters existing in Kansas and Nebraska, ordering federal aid to help with relief efforts in both states.
- January 27 – President Bush meets with Leader of the Future Movement Saad Hariri in the Oval Office of the White House for discussions on securing a free Lebanon during the morning.
- January 30 – President Bush meets with his cabinet in the Cabinet Room for a discussion on the year during the morning. President Bush announces a delegation of leadership led by First Lady Bush in the 2006 Olympic Games in Turin, Italy.
- January 31 – President Bush delivers his State of the Union address.
- January 31 – During the State of the Union Address, the president releases a statement on the death of Coretta Scott King, and another of satisfaction on the Senate voting for the confirmation of Samuel Alito for Associate Justice of the Supreme Court of the United States.

== February ==
- February 1 – President Bush outlines his agenda for a year in address at Grand Ole Opry House in Nashville, Tennessee and Alito is sworn in as Associate Justice during a ceremony in the East Room during the afternoon.
- February 2 – President Bush gives remarks at the 54th Annual National Prayer Breakfast and delivers an economic address in 3M Corporate Headquarters in Maplewood, Minnesota during the morning.
- February 3 – President Bush delivers an address on American competitiveness at the Intel New Mexico in Rio Rancho, New Mexico during the morning. President Bush visits the School of Science and Engineering at the Yvonne A. Ewell Townview Magnet Center in Dallas, Texas, during the afternoon.
- February 4 – President Bush details the American Competitiveness Initiative during his radio address.
- February 6 – Ben Bernanke is sworn in as Chairman of the Federal Reserve. President Bush attends a ceremony honoring Harlem's Dance Theatre in the State Dining Room of the White House during the evening.
- February 13 – President Bush hosts a ceremony for the presenting of National Medals of Science and Technology in the East Room during the morning, and meets with Secretary-General of the United Nations Kofi Annan in the Oval Office during the afternoon.
- February 14 – President Bush hosts the 2005 NCAA Division I baseball tournament Champions Texas Longhorns baseball team in the South Lawn during the afternoon. President Bush issues a statement on the anniversary of the assassination of Prime Minister of Lebanon Rafik Hariri.
- February 15 – President Bush delivers a healthcare address at Wendy's International, Inc. in Dublin, Ohio, during the afternoon. President Bush signs the Federal Deposit Insurance Reform Conforming Amendments Act of 2005.
- February 16 – President Bush engages in a healthcare panel at the U.S. Department of Health and Human Services in D.C. President Bush meets with President of Colombia Álvaro Uribe in the Oval Office of the White House during the afternoon.
- February 20 – President Bush gives a speech on energy initiatives at Johnson Controls Building Efficiency Business in Milwaukee, Wisconsin during the morning. President Bush address solar technology and his administration's energy policy at United Solar Ovonic LLC in Auburn Hills, Michigan, during the afternoon.
- February 21 – President Bush discusses energy conservation efforts at National Renewable Energy Laboratory in Golden, Colorado during the morning. President Bush delivers an address on Port Security in the South Lawn during the afternoon.
- February 22 – President Bush delivers an address on Asia Society, India, and Pakistan at the Mandarin Oriental Hotel in D.C. during the morning and hosts an African American History Month ceremony at the White House during the afternoon.
- February 23 – President Bush holds a cabinet meeting on a report concerning lessons learned from Hurricane Katrina in the Cabinet Room during the morning and delivers an address endorsing Chris Chocola in Mishawaka, Indiana during the afternoon.
- February 24 – President Bush delivers an address to the American Legion at the Capital Hilton Hotel in D.C. and Vice President Cheney speaks at the presentation of the Distinguished Service Cross to Bernard Bail in the Roosevelt Room during the morning.
- February 25 – President Bush discusses his upcoming meeting with American governors and outlining the contents of their meeting including domestic and foreign policies such as Medicare and the war on terror during his radio address.
- February 27 – President Bush delivers a speech to the National Governors Association in the State Dining Room during the morning. President Bush gives a speech to the Republican National Governors Association at the National Building Museum in D.C. during the evening.
- February 28 – President Bush meets with Prime Minister of Italy Silvio Berlusconi in the Oval Office and Vice President Cheney delivers an address on Iraq to the 46th Annual American Legion Conference at Hyatt Regency Washington in D.C. during the morning.

== March ==
- March 1 – President Bush meets with President of Afghanistan Hamid Karzai in the Presidential Palace in Kabul, Afghanistan, joins First Lady Bush in dedicating the U.S. Embassy Building in Kabul, and delivers an address at the Clam Shell Bagram Air Base thanking American troops in Afghanistan during the afternoon.
- March 2 – President Bush meets with Prime Minister of India Manmohan Singh and hold a joint press conference at the Hyderabad House in New Delhi, India during the afternoon.
- March 7 – President Bush delivers a Women's History Month and International Women's Day address in the East Room during the morning.
- March 8 – President Bush gives a speech on reconstruction of the Gulf Coast at the Industrial Levee Canal in New Orleans, Louisiana during the morning and travels with First Lady Bush to College Park Elementary School and discussed rebuilding with Governor of Mississippi Haley Barbour in Gautier, Mississippi during the afternoon.
- March 9 – President Bush signs the USA PATRIOT Improvement and Reauthorization Act in the East Room during the afternoon.
- March 10 – President Bush gives an address to the National Newspaper Association Conference at the Wyndham Washington Hotel in Washington, D.C. during the morning.
- March 11 – President Bush receives a briefing by the Joint Improvised Explosive Device Defeat Task Force in the Roosevelt Room during the morning.
- March 13 – President Bush delivers an address on democracy and freedom within Iraq at George Washington University in D.C. during the afternoon.
- March 20 – President Bush delivers a speech and answers questions on the war on terror at the Renaissance Cleveland Hotel in Cleveland, Ohio, during the afternoon.
- March 21 – President Bush holds a press conference in the James S. Brady Briefing Room, and meets with President of Liberia Ellen Johnson Sirleaf in the Oval Office during the morning. President Bush holds an afternoon meeting with non-governmental organizations from Afghanistan and Iraq in the Roosevelt Room
- March 27 – President Bush gives an immigration speech while attending a naturalization ceremony at the Daughters of the American Revolution Administration Building in D.C. and takes part in an interview with Foreign Print Media in the Roosevelt Room during the morning. President Bush delivers an address at the Friends of Conrad Burns Reception at the Madison Hotel in D.C. during the evening.
- March 28 – President Bush announces Joshua Bolten as White House Chief of Staff in the Oval Office and holds the third cabinet meeting of the year for discussions on Iraq during the morning.
- March 29 – President Bush meets with President of Nigeria Olusegun Obasanjo in the Oval Office during the morning and delivers an address on Iraq democracy at Hyatt Regency Capitol Hill in D.C. during the afternoon.
- March 30 – President Bush issues a statement in favor of the release of Jill Carroll and meets with President of Mexico Vicente Fox at the Fiesta Americana Condesa Cancun Hotel in Cancún, Mexico during the afternoon.
- March 31 – President Bush issues a statement expressing condolences for the deaths caused by several earthquakes in the Iranian province of Luristan. President Bush meets with Mexico President Fox and Prime Minister of Canada Stephen Harper at Fiesta Americana Condesa Cancún Hotel in Cancún, Mexico during the morning.

== April ==
- April 4 – President Bush answers questions on healthcare in the Roosevelt Room during the morning.
- April 5 – President Bush speaks on health saving accounts in Playhouse of the Green in Bridgeport, Connecticut, during the morning. President Bush orders federal aid to the state of Tennessee after declaring a major disaster there.
- April 6 – President Bush delivers an address on the war on terror and answers questions at Central Piedmont Community College in Charlotte, North Carolina, during the morning and holds a formal meeting with the 2005–06 NCAA Sports Champions in the South Lawn during the afternoon.
- April 10 – President Bush delivers an address on the war on terror and answers questions relating to the subject at the Johns Hopkins University in Washington, D.C. during the morning.
- April 11 – President Bush joins a panel on Medicare Prescription Drug Benefit at the Etta and Joseph Miller Performing Arts Center in Jefferson City, Missouri and gives an address on Medicare at Wesley Acres in Des Moines, Iowa during the afternoon.
- April 12 – President Bush speaks during a panel on Medicare prescription drug benefits at the Northern Virginia Community College in Annandale, Virginia, during the afternoon. President Bush declares a major disaster in Arkansas and authorizes federal aid.
- April 13 – President Bush delivers an address at the Small Business Week Conference at the Ronald Reagan Building and International Trade Center in Washington, D.C. during the morning.
- April 14 – President Bush issues a statement expressing support for the leadership of United States Secretary of Defense Donald Rumsfeld.
- April 19 – President Bush holds a breakfast meeting with four governors who have returned from Kuwait, Iraq, and Afghanistan, and White House Press Secretary Scott McClellan announces his resignation from his position in the South Lawn during the morning. President Bush delivers an address on the American Competitiveness Initiative at Tuskegee University in Tuskegee, Alabama during the afternoon.
- April 20 – President Bush meets with Hu Jintao at the White House, honoring him in a ceremony on the South Lawn.
- April 21 – President Bush engages in a discussion on the American Competitiveness Initiative at Cisco Systems, Inc. in San Jose, California during the afternoon.
- April 22 – President Bush delivers an address in favor of the National Unity Government Agreement at the California Highway Patrol Academy in Sacramento, California and a speech on advanced transportation technology in West Sacramento during the afternoon. President Bush gives a speech at the Republican National Committee Reception in Indian Wells, California during the evening.
- April 24 – A poll is released showing Bush having an approval rating of 32%. President Bush gives an address on immigration reform at the Hyatt Regency Irvine in Irvine, California during the morning and gives a speech in favor of Jon Porter at the Venetian Resort Hotel Casino in Las Vegas, Nevada during the afternoon.
- April 25 – President Bush delivers an energy speech at the Marriott Wardman Park Hotel in Washington, D.C. during the morning.
- April 27 – President Bush delivers a speech in New Orleans, Louisiana, amid his visitation of damaged homes during the morning.
- April 28 – President Bush meets with President of Azerbaijan Ilham Aliyev in the Oval Office, and addresses the economy along with answering questions from reporters on the Rose Garden during the morning. President Bush meets with American citizens to address Sudan in the Roosevelt Room of the White House during the afternoon.
- April 29 – President Bush discusses Iraq during his radio address.

== May ==
- May 1 – President and First Lady Bush host the America Presidential Awards in the Rose Garden during the morning. Vice President Cheney gives a speech at the World Affairs Council of Philadelphia Luncheon located within the Park Hyatt Philadelphia at the Bellevue in Philadelphia, Pennsylvania during the afternoon. President Bush delivers an address on his health care policy at the Washington Hilton Hotel in Washington, D.C. during the afternoon.
- May 2 – President Bush announces the designation of a Presidential Delegation to San José, Costa Rica that will attend the inauguration of Óscar Arias Sánchez as President of Costa Rica.
- May 3 – President Bush delivers an economic address at the Grand Hyatt Hotel in D.C. during the morning. President Bush meets with members of congress to address issues relating to energy in the Cabinet Room during the afternoon. President Bush meets with Chancellor of Germany Angela Merkel in the Oval Office during the evening.
- May 4 – President Bush delivers an address commemorating the National Day of Prayer in the East Room during the morning.
- May 5 – President Bush tours Frager's Hardware in D.C. and speaks about the economy during the morning. President Bush announces he has accepted the resignation of Porter Goss while in the Oval Office during the afternoon.
- May 6 – President Bush gives the commencement address at Oklahoma State University in Stillwater, Oklahoma during the morning.
- May 8 – President Bush announces the nomination of Michael Hayden as Director of the Central Intelligence Agency in the Oval Office, and addresses the Sudan Peace agreement in the Roosevelt Room during the morning.
- May 9 – President Bush makes a joint appearance with Health and Human Services Secretary Leavitt at Broward Community College in Coconut Creek, Florida, and President Bush delivers a speech on Medicare at the Kings Point Clubhouse in Sun City Center, Florida during the morning.
- May 15 – President Bush delivers an address at the Annual Peace Officers' Memorial Service in the United States Capitol during the afternoon. President Bush delivers an Oval Office address on immigration reform during the evening.
- May 16 – President Bush formally welcomes Prime Minister of Australia John Howard to the South Lawn during the morning.
- May 17 – President Bush signs the Tax Relief Extension Reconciliation Act of 2005 into law during a South Lawn ceremony in the afternoon.
- May 18 – President Bush delivers an address on immigration reform in the Yuma Sector Border Patrol Headquarters in Yuma, Arizona during the afternoon.
- May 19 – President Bush gives a speech on the American Competitiveness Initiative at Northern Kentucky University in Highland Heights, Kentucky, and delivers an address at a reception for Geoff Davis at the Hilton Cincinnati Airport in Florence, Kentucky during the afternoon. Vice President Cheney gives the commencement address at Louisiana State University in the Pete Maravich Assembly Center in Baton Rouge, Louisiana, during the afternoon.
- May 25 – President Bush attends and delivers an address at the Commandant of the United States Coast Guard Change of Command ceremony at Fort Lesley J. McNair in D.C. during the morning. President Bush and Prime Minister Blair hold a joint press conference in the East Room during the evening.
- May 26 – President Bush and Prime Minister Blair issue a joint statement announcing "the United States and United Kingdom recently signed an agreement that allows appropriately cleared British and U.S. personnel to use the same computer network to access military and intelligence information and other planning tools to support joint military operations in the defense of freedom." Vice President Cheney gives the United States Naval Academy commencement address in the Navy-Marine Corps Memorial Stadium in Annapolis, Maryland during the morning.
- May 27 – President Bush gives the United States Military Academy at West Point commencement address in West Point, New York, during the morning.
- May 29 – President Bush attends a ceremony on Memorial Day in Arlington National Cemetery during the morning.
- May 30 – President Bush announces his nomination of Henry Paulson as United States Secretary of the Treasury in the Rose Garden during the morning.
- May 31 – Michael Hayden is sworn in as Director of the Central Intelligence Agency at the CIA Headquarters in Langley, Virginia, during the afternoon.

== June ==
- June 1 – President Bush delivers an address on immigration reform in the United States Chamber of Commerce during the morning. The Cabinet holds a morning meeting in the Cabinet Room on a variety of topics, President Bush disclosing this included talks of the war on terror. Brett Kavanaugh is sworn in to the U.S. Court of Appeals for the District of Columbia Circuit in the Rose Garden during the afternoon. President Bush delivers remarks during the ceremony.
- June 2 – President Bush meets with the Super Bowl XL champion Pittsburgh Steelers in the East Room during the afternoon, delivering an address congratulating and praising the members of the team.
- June 5 – President Bush meets with President of the Republic of the Congo Denis Sassou Nguesso for a wide-ranging discussion in the Oval Office during the morning. President Bush delivers an address on the Federal Marriage Amendment while in the Presidential Hall at the Eisenhower Executive Office Building during the afternoon.
- June 6 – President Bush gives a speech on immigration reform and border security at the Federal Law Enforcement Training Center in Artesia, New Mexico during the morning. President Bush makes an appearance at the Laredo Border Patrol Sector Headquarters in Laredo, Texas, during the afternoon. President Bush discusses and answers questions on comprehensive immigration reform.
- June 7 – President Bush delivers an address on comprehensive immigration reform at Metropolitan Community College in Omaha, Nebraska, during the morning. Dirk Kempthorne is sworn in as the 49th United States Secretary of the Interior in the South Lawn during the afternoon.
- June 8 – President Bush delivers an address expressing his satisfaction with the death of Abu Musab al-Zarqawi in the Rose Garden during the morning. President Bush attends and delivers an address at the National Hispanic Prayer Breakfast while in the J.W. Marriott Hotel during the morning. President Bush meets with American governors to give an update on the Iraq War and discuss the Line-Item Veto in the Roosevelt Room during the morning.
- June 12 – President Bush receives a three-hour morning briefing on the situation in Iraq during a stay at Camp David.
- June 13 – President Bush meets with Prime Minister of Iraq Nouri al-Maliki for discussions on strategies for security, economics, and reconstruction during the morning. President Bush delivers an address to troops on the current status of Iraq and the manifestations of recent developments in Green Zone, Baghdad.
- June 14 – President Bush holds a press conference in the Rose Garden during the morning. President Bush is offered advice by the Iraq Study Group during a Roosevelt Room meeting in the afternoon.
- June 15 – President Bush delivers an address to the Initiative for Global Development's 2006 National Summit at Willard InterContinental Washington during the morning.
- June 19 – President Bush delivers the commencement address at the United States Merchant Marine Academy at Captain Tomb Field at Brooks Stadium during the morning. President Bush attends the 2006 President's Dinner at the Washington Convention Center during the evening.
- June 21 – President Bush speaks at a press conference during the 2006 U.S.-EU Summit in Zeremoniensaal Hall of Hofburg Palace in Vienna, Austria during the afternoon. President Bush and First Lady Bush speak to students at the Austrian National Library during the afternoon.
- June 22 – Vice President Cheney gives a speech to the U.S.-India Business Council's 31st Anniversary Leadership Summit at the U.S. Chamber of Commerce during the afternoon.
- June 23 – Vice President Cheney delivers an address at the Chicago Mercantile Exchange in Chicago, Illinois, during the morning. President Bush gives remarks at a Tee Ball game on the South Lawn during the afternoon.
- June 26 – President Bush meets with American military in Iraq and Afghanistan supporters in the Roosevelt Room during the morning.
- June 27 – President Bush delivers an address on Line-Item Veto at the JW Marriott Hotel in D.C. during the morning. President Bush meets with recipients of the National Endowment for Democracy Award in the Oval Office during the afternoon.
- June 28 – President Bush holds an afternoon meeting with military personnel from both Iraq and Afghanistan at the VFW Overland-St. Ann Memorial Post 3944 in St. Louis, Missouri. President Bush releases a statement approving the Senate's decision to confirm Henry Paulson for Treasury Secretary. President Bush releases a statement on the fiftieth anniversary of the Poznań 1956 protests.
- June 29 – President Bush holds a press conference with Prime Minister of Japan Junichiro Koizumi in the East Room during the morning.
- June 30 – President Bush gives a statement in Graceland in Memphis, Tennessee, after a tour with Prime Minister Koizumi during the evening. Bush declares the existence of a major disaster in the Commonwealth of Pennsylvania and orders federal aid.

== July ==
- July 27 – President Bush signs the Voting Rights Act Reauthorization and Amendments Act of 2006 in the South Lawn during the morning. President Bush signs the Returned Americans Protection Act of 2006, a temporary increase in funding for American citizens who traveled and have returned to the United States from foreign countries.
- July 28 – President Bush and Prime Minister Blair hold a joint news conference in the East Room during the afternoon. The two answer questions on the Middle East and other global issues from reporters.
- July 29 – President Bush delivers his radio address on the Middle East and the policy enacted by his administration in response to the current climate there.
- July 30 – President Bush delivers remarks on the Middle East in the South Lawn during the afternoon. President Bush gives remarks at the beginning of a tee ball game on the South Lawn during the afternoon.
- July 31 – President Bush meets with South Florida natives at the Versailles Restaurant and Bakery alongside his brother Governor of Florida Jeb Bush for discussions on business during the morning. President Bush gives a speech on the economy at the U.S. Coast Guard Integrated Support Command in Miami, Florida, during the morning. President Bush receives a tour of the port of Miami during the morning. Bush reports positively on the usage of funds generated by the administration to the advancement of technology there.

== August ==
- August 14 – President Bush in a press conference at the State Department addressed the conclusion of the 2006 Lebanon War, by stating that Hezbollah was responsible for starting the war, and that the group suffered a defeat at the hands of Israel. He dismissed claims of victory by Hezbollah leaders, asking: "how can you claim victory when at one time you were a state within a state, safe within southern Lebanon, and now you're going to be replaced by a Lebanese Army and an international force?"
- August 21 – President Bush in a press conference at the White House updated the current situation in the Iraq War by stating "imagine a world in which you had Saddam Hussein who had the capacity to make a weapon of mass destruction, who was paying suiciders to kill innocent life, who had relations with Zarqawi. Imagine what the world would be like with him in power".

== September ==
- September 6 – President Bush confirmed, for the first time in a speech at the White House, that the CIA had held "high-value detainees" for interrogation in secret prisons around the world. He also announced that fourteen senior Al-Qaeda captives, including Khalid Sheikh Mohammed, were being transferred from CIA custody, to military custody, at Guantanamo Bay detention camp.
- September 11 – President Bush addresses the nation from the Oval Office on the fifth anniversary of the September 11 attacks and the current progress in the war on terror.
- September 29 – President Bush discusses the war on terror in an address at the Marriott Wardman Park hotel in Washington DC.

== November ==
- November 2 – President Bush travels to Montana to appear in support of Senator Conrad Burns in his re-election bid against Democratic nominee Jon Tester.
- November 4 – President Bush delivers a radio address from Mile High Coffee Shop in Englewood, Colorado and gives a speech at Island Grove Regional Park in Greeley, Colorado during the morning. Vice President Cheney gives a speech at Laramie High School in Laramie, Wyoming during the morning.
- November 5 – President Bush endorses Pete Ricketts in an address at Heartland Events Center in Grand Island, Nebraska, during the afternoon.
- November 7 – The Democratic Party takes control of both Congressional Houses in the 2006 Midterm elections.
- November 9 – In the afternoon, Bush reveals Robert Gates as his choice to succeed Donald Rumsfeld as U.S. Secretary of Defense.
- November 13 – President Bush meets with Prime Minister of Israel Ehud Olmert in the Oval Office for the development of a method of obtaining peace during the morning. President Bush attends the groundbreaking ceremony for the Martin Luther King Jr. Memorial at the National Mall during the morning.
- November 14 – President Bush holds an Oval Office meeting with CEOs of American automobile manufacturers to discuss making their companies capable of competing within a global economy during the morning.
- November 15 – President Bush meets with Russian President Vladimir Putin in Moscow.
- November 17 – President Bush recalls the Vietnam War and touts it as reminding Americans the US will succeed "unless we quit" following a lunch with Australian Prime Minister John Howard.
- November 19 – The US and Russia sign agreements supporting the ascension of Russia into the World Trade Organization, President Bush saying in an official statement, "This is a good agreement for the United States. And it's an equally important agreement for Russia. And it's a good agreement for the international trading community."
- November 25 – President Bush gives a radio address on Thanksgiving and his plans in regards to the holiday.
- November 26 – President Bush issues a statement on the death of Texas Congressman Frank L. Madla and his family in a fire two days prior.
- November 27 – President Bush signs the Lower Farmington River and Salmon Brook Wild and Scenic River Study Act of 2005, the Pactola Reservoir Reallocation Authorization Act of 2005, the Idaho Land Enhancement Act, the Fort McDowell Indian Community Water Rights Settlement Revision Act of 2006, and the Animal Enterprise Terrorism Act.
- November 28 – President Bush gives a speech on NATO in the Grand Hall at Latvia University in Riga, Latvia.
- November 29 – President Bush issues a statement on the elections in the Democratic Republic of the Congo.
- November 30 – President Bush holds a joint news conference with Prime Minister of Iraq Nouri al-Maliki at the Four Seasons Hotel Amman in Amman, Jordan. President Bush announces his appointments of Daniel J. Carroll, Jr. and Howard L. Lance to the President's National Security Telecommunications Advisory Committee, and the designations of Gary D. Forsee for Chairman of the President's National Security Telecommunications Advisory Committee and Randall L. Stephenson for Vice-Chairman of the President's National Security Telecommunications Advisory Committee.
- November 30 – First Lady Laura Bush unveils the Christmas decorations at the White House for the sixth time.

== December ==
- December 1 – President Bush delivers remarks on World AIDS Day, proclaiming the virus can be vanquished in the face of advancements in medicine from an international collaboration to find a cure, in the Roosevelt Room during the morning.
- December 2 – President Bush speaks on the developments of Iraq during his radio address.
- December 4 – President Bush meets with Leader of the Islamic Supreme Council of Iraq Abdul-Aziz Al-Hakim in the Oval Office.
- December 5 – President Bush has breakfast with Secretary of Defense nominee Robert Gates, telling reporters in brief remarks minutes later that Gates "will be a fine Secretary of Defense."
- December 6 – President Bush says he would like "to thank James Baker and Lee Hamilton and the panel members for spending a lot of time on this really difficult issue" after receiving the Iraq Study Group report while speaking from the Cabinet Room during the morning. President Bush meets with members of Congress at the White House during the afternoon and expresses interest in having both Democratic and Republican congressmen participate: "My message is this: I want to work with the Congress, I want to work with people in both parties, so that we can send a message to the American people that the struggle for freedom, the struggle for our security is not the purview of one party over the other."
- December 7 – President Bush meets with Prime Minister of the United Kingdom Tony Blair at the Dwight D. Eisenhower Executive Office Building during the morning. The President and First Lady attend the lighting of the National Christmas Tree at the Ellipse during the afternoon.
- December 8 – President Bush meets with Democratic and Republican leaders in both chambers of Congress in the Cabinet Room during the morning. President Bush holds a meeting with President of South Africa Thabo Mbeki in the Oval Office during the afternoon.
- December 9 – President Bush discusses the Iraq conflict as well as recent meetings at the White House pertaining to the war during his radio address. President Bush issues a statement in praise of Congress passing what he calls a strengthened version of the Magnuson-Stevens Act, saying it matches his "priorities of ending overfishing and rebuilding our Nation's fish stocks through more effective, market-based management and tougher enforcement."
- December 10 – President Bush issues a statement condemning the genocide in Darfur.
- December 21 – President Bush signs the Palestinian Anti-Terrorism Act of 2006, the law intended "to promote the development of democratic institutions in areas under the administrative control of the Palestinian Authority."
- December 22 – President Bush and First Lady Laura Bush participate in a service project at the Walter Reed Army Medical Center in Washington, D.C.
- December 23 – President Bush discusses Christmas during his radio address.
- December 24 – President Bush telephones service members on Christmas Eve located within the US and abroad to thank them for their service.
- December 25 – President Bush releases a written statement in response to the death of James Brown, saying in part, "James Brown's family and friends are in our thoughts and prayers this Christmas."
- December 27 – President Bush addresses the death of former U.S. President Gerald Ford the previous day in a televised statement.
- December 28 – President Bush meets with his national security advisors at the Prairie Chapel Ranch in Crawford, Texas, saying afterward that he is "making good progress toward coming up with a plan" to prevent radicals from Iraq from attacking the US.
- December 29 – President Bush releases a statement after the execution of Saddam Hussein: "We are reminded today of how far the Iraqi people have come since the end of Saddam Hussein's rule – and that the progress they have made would not have been possible without the continued service and sacrifice of our men and women in uniform."
- December 30 – President Bush remembers the life of President Ford during his radio address.
- December 31 – President Bush issues a statement reflecting on the year as well as predicting the administration's actions for the upcoming 2007: "In 2006, the number of jobs steadily increased, wages grew, the unemployment rate dropped, and we achieved our goal of cutting the deficit in half three years ahead of schedule."

== See also ==
- Timeline of the George W. Bush presidency, for an index of the Bush presidency timeline articles

U.S. presidential administration timelines
Preceded by Bush presidency (2005)	Bush presidency (2006)	Succeeded by Bush presidency (2007)
