= Timeline of the George W. Bush presidency (2004) =

The following is a timeline of the presidency of George W. Bush, from January 1, 2004 to December 31, 2004.

== January ==
- January 5 – President Bush discusses education's progress within his administration in St. Louis, Missouri.
- January 7 – President Bush discusses plans to change US immigration laws and make it possible for eight million illegal immigrants to obtain legal status through working temporarily, calling the new system "more compassionate".
- January 8 – President Bush delivers an address commemorating the second anniversary of the No Child Left Behind Act during an appearance at West View Elementary in Knoxville, Tennessee during the morning.
- January 9 – President Bush talks about the economy with female business owners in Washington, D.C. at the Department of Commerce for the sake of preserving the strength of the "entrepreneurial spirit" in America.
- January 13 – President Bush announces federal aid for the state of California after declaring the existence of a major disaster in the state.
- January 14 – In a speech at the NASA headquarters, President Bush reveals a plan to get Americans to the moon by 2020, proposing $12 billion be used for the effort over the next five years.
- January 20 – President Bush delivers his annual State of the Union Address before a joint session of Congress.
- January 24 – President Bush delivers his radio address on health care reform and its relation to his administration.
- January 26 – President Bush gives a speech in Little Rock, Arkansas on the possible reform of medical liability.
- January 29 – President Bush talks about the economic plan of his administration in New Hampshire.
- January 30 – President Bush talks about the economy with what he calls "some of our nation's finest economists" in the Roosevelt Room.
- January 31 – President Bush releases a statement praising Jennifer Dunn.

== February ==
- February 2 – President Bush holds a cabinet meeting and discusses the budget afterward during the morning. President Bush issues a proclamation declaring February 2004 as "American Heart Month".
- February 3 – President Bush meets with Secretary-General of the United Nations Kofi Annan in the Oval Office of the White House during the morning.
- February 4 – President Bush delivers a speech on Middle East democracy in the Library of Congress in Washington during the afternoon.
- February 19 – President Bush talks about the economy as well as wishes for Congress to make tax cuts a permanent fixture during an appearance at the Eisenhower Executive Office Building.
- February 23 – President Bush speaks at the National Governors Association.
- February 24 – President Bush delivers an address in the Roosevelt Room indicating his displeasure with attempts across the US to support same-sex marriage and recalls the Defense of Marriage Act as proof of "overwhelming consensus in our country for protecting the institution of marriage."
- February 26 – While giving a speech in Kentucky, President Bush discusses the economy and calls on Congress to rally behind passing tax cuts.
- February 27 – President Bush meets with Chancellor of Germany Gerhard Schröder at the White House and the two hold a joint press conference.
- February 29 – President Bush issues a statement on the resigning of Jean-Bertrand Aristide as the President of Haiti and says he has deployed marines for the bringing of order and stability to the country.

== March ==
- March 1 – In a written statement, Bush urges Congress to remove newly imposed tariffs on American exports by reforming the tax code through their passage of the FSC/ETI legislation. Bush predicts that, should the legislation not be passed, by the following year the currently imposed tariffs will "impose an increasing burden on American exporters, their workers, and the overall economy".
- March 3 – President Bush delivers a critique of Democratic presidential candidate John Kerry during a fundraiser in Santa Clara, California, noting that Kerry has taken both sides on issues and examples Kerry did not support removing Hussein from power despite claiming to oppose him.

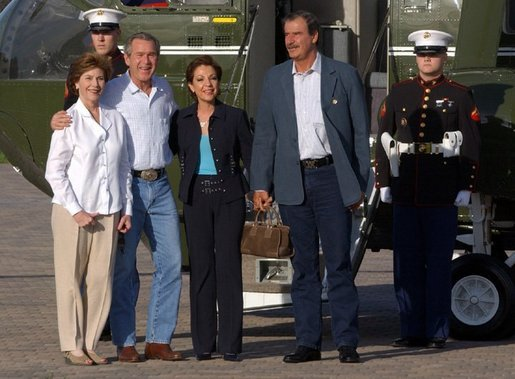
President George W. Bush and Laura Bush welcome President Vicente Fox of Mexico and Mrs. Marta Sahagún de Fox to their ranch in Crawford, Texas, on March 5, 2004.

- March 5 – During a news conference, two September 11 attacks victim family members and a former firefighter express their disdain for new Bush campaign ads featuring the September 11 attacks. Rudy Giuliani calls the ad "tasteful" for showing the "challenges the president has faced -- the recession, other things and September 11, 2001."
- March 10 – US officials report the Bush administration in the near future will begin stronger sanctions against Syria. Assistant Secretary of State William J. Burns tells the House International Relations Committee the sanctions "will be a very firm implementation of the Syrian Accountability Act and the intent behind it."
- March 11 – Near the end of the morning, Bush releases a statement on the Madrid train bombings where he offers condolences to the families of victims and reaffirms the US's support for Spain. In the evening, Bush flies to New York for a fundraiser for his re-election campaign, saying New York will be part of "a great national victory in November".
- March 17 – President Bush meets with Taoiseach of Ireland Bertie Ahern in the Roosevelt Room.
- March 19 – President Bush marks the anniversary of the invasion of Iraq, praising it as a "day of deliverance" for Iraq and a day that saw "decisive action" occur from years of requests and promises being made from the US and the countries aligned with America.
- March 27 – President Bush mentions improvements to the rate of home ownership and his signing into law of the American Dream Down Payment Act during a radio address.
- March 30 – President Bush appears at the Fox Cities Performing Art Center in Appleton, Wisconsin, touting improvements to the economy before and after the September 11 attacks as well as laws made in the wake of the event.

== April ==
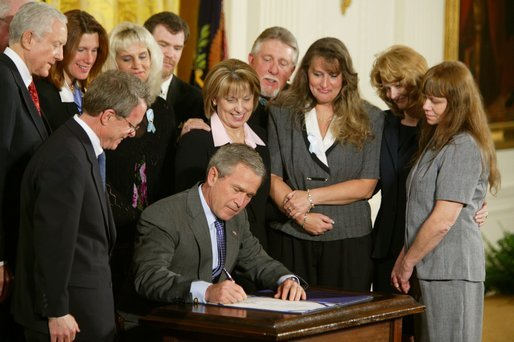
President George W. Bush signs H.R. 1997, the Unborn Victims of Violence Act of 2004, in the East Room on April 1, 2004

- April 1 – In the East Room, President Bush signs the Unborn Victims of Violence Act, saying the day marks the end of the federal crime code's silence "on the injury or death of a child in cases of violence against a pregnant woman."
- April 2 – Speaking to audience at Marshall University in Huntington, West Virginia, Bush reports the passed tax relief as working, evidenced by what he dubs a "stronger" economy. He then speaks with students and educators.
- April 3 – President Bush reports the tax cuts, tax relief, lowered interest rates, and increase of tax disposable income during his radio address.
- April 5 – President Bush gives a speech on the economy and job training at Central Piedmont Community College in Charlotte, North Carolina.
- April 10 – President Bush gives an update on the Iraq war during his radio address.
- April 15 – President Bush gives an address on tax relief in Des Moines, Iowa.
- April 16 – President Bush and Prime Minister of the United Kingdom Tony Blair hold a joint press conference at the White House.
- April 19 – President Bush announces he is nominating John Negroponte as United States Ambassador to Iraq.
- April 21 – President Bush delivers an address on how to create lasting prosperity at the Newspaper Association of America Annual Convention.
- April 26 – President Bush reveals his tech initiative for the respective fields of energy, healthcare and the internet during an appearance at the American Association of Community Colleges Annual Convention, Bush acknowledge the new flag of Iraq, replacing the former Ba'athist flag of Saddam Hussein that said "God is great" by his handwriting to the national flag of Iraqi Governing Council officially adopted the new flag, and President Bush issued a statement recognizing it was a significant step in the process of establishing a new Iraqi government following the 2003 invasion, which formed itself as the Coalition Provisional Authority by the United States occupation.
- April 27 – President Bush speaks at the Department of Veterans Affairs Medical Center in Baltimore, Maryland.
- April 29 – President Bush and Vice President Dick Cheney meet with the 9/11 Commission, Bush calling it important and wide-ranging in the issues discussed.
- April 30 – At the White House, President Bush meets with Prime Minister of Canada Paul Martin, Bush saying he appreciates Martin's clear vision on the world.

== May ==
- May 1 – President Bush notes the accomplishments of his policy on Iraq during his radio address.
- May 3 – United States National Security Advisor Condoleezza Rice answers questions in regards to Iraq and the Middle East at the Eisenhower Executive Office Building.
- May 5 – President Bush conducts an interview with Al Arabiya Television in the Map Room in regards to his foreign policy.
- May 17 – President Bush speaks at the grand opening of the Brown v Board of Education National Historic Site in Topeka, Kansas.
- May 18 – President Bush delivers a speech to the American Israel Public Affairs Committee at the Washington Convention Center.
- May 20 – President Bush meets with Prime Minister of Greece Kostas Karamanlis in the Oval Office.
- May 21 – President Bush delivers the commencement address for Louisiana State University at the Pete Maravich Assembly Center.
- May 24 – Vice President Cheney speaks at a reception for a committee on the re-election campaign in Little Rock, Arkansas.

== June ==
- June 2 – President Bush compares the Iraq war and battling terrorism to World War II and battling communism during a US Air Force Academy commencement ceremony, also comparing the September 11 attacks to the attack on Pearl Harbor.
- June 3 – CIA Director George Tenet resigns, saying it will be effective on July 11, the seventh anniversary of his appointment to the position by former president Bill Clinton.
- June 4 – The White House announces President Bush has selected Senator John Danforth as the next United States Ambassador to the United Nations.
- June 5 – President Bush arrives in Paris for a trip to rally support for the Iraq war as well as note the D-Day invasion of Normandy for its sixtieth anniversary.
- June 6 – During a commemoration address of D-Day's anniversary to veterans at the Colleville-sur-Mer American military cemetery, he pays homage to former President Ronald Reagan by calling him "a courageous man himself, and a gallant leader in the cause of freedom" and tells the veterans they'll eternally be honored by America and countries freed at the time of the war.
- June 11 – President Bush delivers a eulogy during President Reagan’s state funeral.
- June 12 – President Bush dedicates his radio address to discussing President Reagan’s life and legacy.
- June 13 – President Bush declares Missouri has a major disaster, ordering federal aid to help in repairing damage brought on by storms, floods, and tornadoes the previous month.
- June 14 – President Bush and First Lady Laura Bush invite former President Bill Clinton and former First Lady Hillary Clinton back to the White House for the unveiling of the latter's official White House portraits.

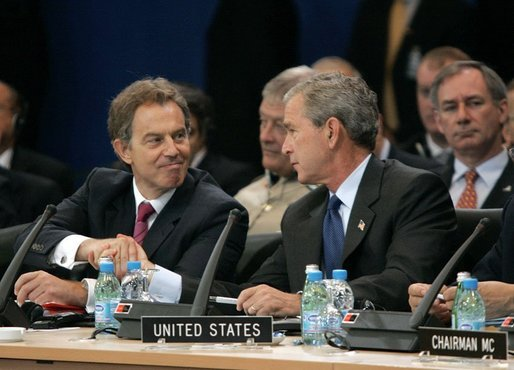
U.S. President George W. Bush and U.K. Prime Minister Tony Blair shake hands after receiving notification that the Coalition Provisional Authority had returned full sovereignty to Iraq and transferred control of the nation to the Iraqi interim government while the two were at a NATO summit in Istanbul, Turkey on June 28, 2004.

- June 28 – President Bush has a news conference with United Kingdom Prime Minister Tony Blair in Istanbul, Bush stating the intent of the US to finish the "difficult task" in Iraq. Following a meeting between members of the State Department and Muammar Gaddafi, the State Department says the United States has ended 24 years of non-direct diplomatic ties with Libya.
- June 29 – In an address at Istanbul University, Bush says Turkey belongs in the European Union, claiming Turkey is moving rapidly to meet the conditions needed to be admitted and that the country's success "is vital to the future of progress and peace in Europe and in the broader Middle East."

== July ==
- July 1 – In the East Room, President Bush notes the fortieth anniversary of the Civil Rights Act, Bush saying it gives Americans "another reason to be proud of our country."
- July 2 – President Bush talks about the economy in front of an audience of business owners in the East Room.
- July 12 – President Bush speaks about the gains made in the war on terror at the Oak Ridge National Laboratory in Oak Ridge, Tennessee.
- July 13 – At the Dwight Eisenhower Executive Office building, President Bush signs the African Growth and Opportunity Act.
- July 22 – The 9/11 Commission releases its final report.

== August ==
- August 10 – President Bush announces his nomination of Porter Goss for Director of the Central Intelligence Agency in the Rose Garden.
- August 12 – President Bush delivers a speech to the United Brotherhood of Carpenters and Joiners of America at the International Training Facility in Las Vegas, Nevada.
- August 13 – President Bush releases a public statement on his trip to Boeing Delivery Center in Seattle, Washington.
- August 19 – National Security Advisor Rice speaks on the war on terror and answers questions in Washington.
- August 22 – President Bush re-election campaign manager Ken Mehlman denies the campaign has been trying to smear Democratic presidential nominee John Kerry, saying the Bush campaign has praised Kerry's service and that the allegation is only being made to avoid focusing on issues.
- August 25 – Vice President Cheney charges Democratic presidential nominee Kerry with wanting to have sensitivity in fighting the war in Iraq and claims past successful U.S. Presidents Abraham Lincoln, Franklin D. Roosevelt, and Harry Truman did not win with such a strategy in Pottsville, Pennsylvania.
- August 29 – President Bush attends a campaign rally in Wheeling, West Virginia. Early in his remarks, he predicts that he will carry the state in the upcoming election.
- August 30 – Senator John McCain endorses Bush for re-election.
- August 31 – President Bush delivers a speech at the 86th Annual American Legion National Convention.

== September ==
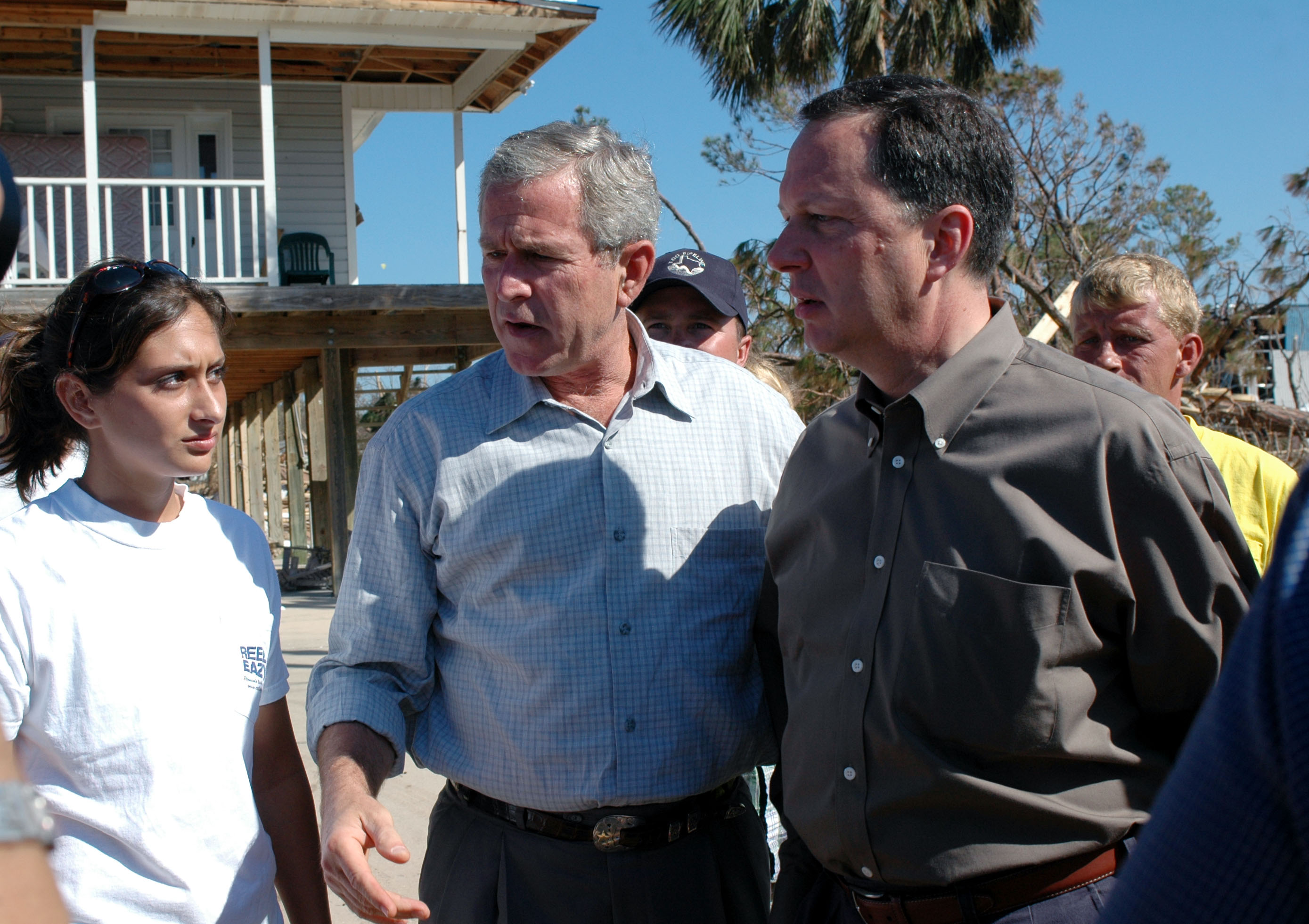
President George W. Bush and Department of Homeland Security Under Secretary Michael Brown talk with residents affected by Hurricane Ivan on September 19, 2004.

- September 19 – President Bush travels to Florida to see the damages of Hurricane Ivan, meeting with Governor of Alabama Bob Riley and brother Jeb Bush, incumbent Governor of Florida. Senator John McCain reflects that President Bush's clearness to Americans on Iraq as not "as straight as maybe we'd like to see" and calls it a mistake for not enough American troops being in place during the first victories won by Americans there, citing it as the beginning of "very, very significant" troubles for the US.
- September 20 – During a speech at New York University, Democratic presidential nominee Kerry asserts President Bush's Iran policy as having weakened American national security and accuses him of creating a "a crisis of historic proportions".
- September 23 – President Bush and Prime Minister of Iraq Ayad Allawi hold a joint press conference in the Rose Garden.
- September 27 – President Bush gives a speech on the education policy of his administration at the Springfield, Ohio Midwest Livestock and Expo Center.
- September 30 – President Bush thanks "those who've reached out to help the neighbors in need" while speaking at the Martin County Red Cross Headquarters in Stuart, Florida.
- September 30 – President Bush and Senator John Kerry participate in the first presidential debate at University of Miami in Coral Gables, Florida. The debate moderator was Jim Lehrer of PBS.

== October ==
- October 4 – President Bush signs a tax relief bill in the morning hours, claiming during a speech hours later in Des Moines, Iowa that "a family of four earning $40,000 would have seen their federal income taxes rise by more than $900" had the law not been passed ahead of a planned 2004 expiration for tax relief provisions.
- October 5 – President Bush signs a plurality of laws, including the Mount Rainier National Park Boundary Adjustment Act of 2004, the Johnstown Flood National Memorial Boundary Adjustment Act of 2004, the Martin Luther King, Junior, National Historic Site Land Exchange Act, the Carpinteria and Montecito Water Distribution Systems Conveyance Act of 2004, the Railroad Right-of-Way Conveyance Validation Act of 2004, the Williamson County Water Recycling Act of 2004, the Southwest Forest Health and Wildfire Prevention Act of 2004, and the Timucuan Ecological and Historic Preserve Boundary Revision Act of 2004 among several laws not formally titled.
- October 5 – Vice President Dick Cheney and Senator John Edwards participate in the only vice presidential debate at Case Western Reserve University in Cleveland, Ohio. The debate was moderated by Gwen Ifill of PBS.
- October 7 – President Bush releases a public statement on the Iraq report, assessing in part that the US was right in taking action and is safer thanks to the incarceration of Hussein.
- October 8 – President Bush and Senator John Kerry participate in the second presidential debate at Washington University in St. Louis, Missouri in a town hall format. The debate was moderated by Charles Gibson of ABC.
- October 12 – President Bush delivers a speech in Colorado Springs during a rally there, addressing the ongoing election and outlining his policies.
- October 13 – President Bush and Senator John Kerry participate in the third and final presidential debate at Arizona State University in Tempe, Arizona. The debate was moderated by CBS News veteran Bob Schieffer.
- October 19 – President Bush gives an address in The Villages, Florida, charging Senator Kerry with wanting to move the US "in the direction of government-run health care" and proclaiming that he himself has "set out policies that move this country toward a positive and optimistic vision." Bush argues this difference among others makes the "choice in this election" clear.
- October 29 – President Bush releases a statement stating that he'd been informed earlier during the day of a tape the US intelligence community was analyzing and that Americans "will not be intimidated or influenced by an enemy of our country."

== November ==
- November 2 – The 2004 United States presidential election takes place. President Bush is re-elected, defeating the Democratic Party presidential nominee John Kerry from Massachusetts.
- November 2 – The Republican Party retains their majorities in the House of Representatives and the Senate.
- November 3 – President Bush delivers a victory speech, stating the intent of his second term to focus on "economic recovery, fixing an outdated tax code, improving Social Security, building on education initiatives and helping the emerging democracies of Iraq and Afghanistan", at the Ronald Reagan Building.
- November 4 – During a news conference, President Bush says he'll work with both Democrats and Republicans and reflects that he is now more seasoned.
- November 5 – Senior officials in the Bush administration report Robert Blackwill as having earlier in the day announced his intent to resign to the National Security Council.
- November 9 – In the evening, the White House announces the resignations of United States Attorney General John Ashcroft and Secretary of Commerce Don Evans.
- November 10 – In the afternoon, President Bush announces his White House legal counsel and friend Alberto Gonzales as his nominee for United States Attorney General.

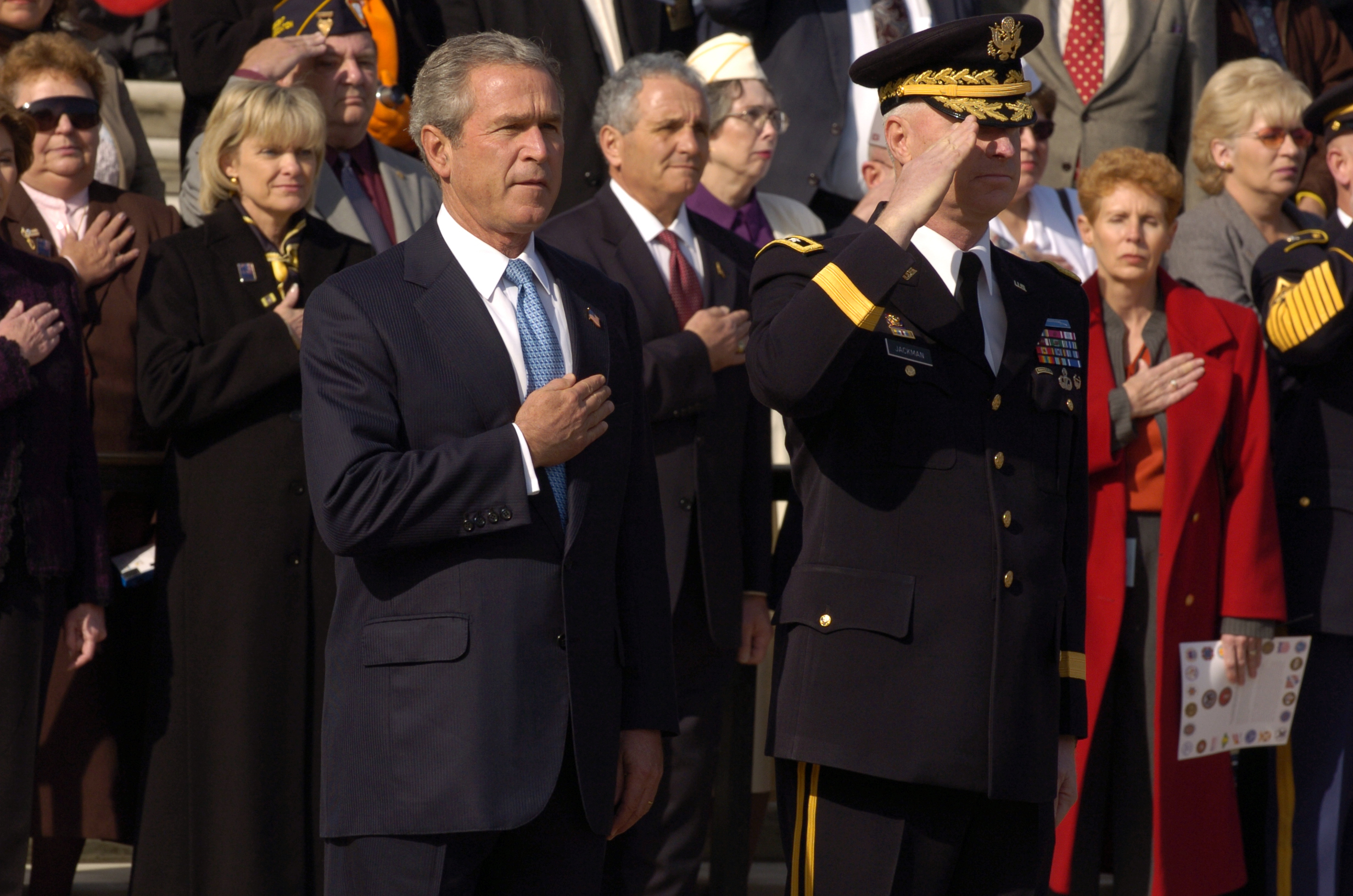
President George W. Bush and Commanding General, Maj. Gen. Galen B. Jackman pay respects to the unknown servicemen laid to rest at the Tomb of the Unknowns in Arlington National Cemetery in Virginia during a Veteran’s Day ceremony on November 11, 2004

- November 11 – Anti-abortion group American League Life criticizes Attorney General nominee Gonzales for ruling in favor of teenage girls not requiring parental consent to get abortion and by extension President Bush for selecting him given his own anti-abortion views. At the White House during the evening hours, President Bush meets with Prime Minister of Britain Tony Blair.
- November 12 – President Bush promises the use of American dollars to create a Palestinian state during a news conference.
- November 13 – During his radio address, Bush reports the United States' offensive abroad is progressing in taking back Falluja. Vice President Cheney has test performed on him for abnormalities at George Washington University Hospital, leaving in the afternoon.
- November 15 – Secretary of State Colin Powell announces he is resigning. United States Ambassador to the United Nations John Danforth confirms he has not been approached replace Powell. Steven Kappes and Michael J. Sulick, leaders of the directorate of operations of the CIA, resign in the morning.
- November 16 – President Bush announces his choice to nominate confidant and National Security Advisor Condoleezza Rice for United States Secretary of State during a ceremony in the Roosevelt Room.
- November 17 – President Bush announces longtime political ally Margaret Spellings for Secretary of Education.
- November 18 – President Bush speaks at a dedication to the Bill Clinton Presidential Library and Museum.
- November 20 – During his radio address, President Bush says he'll be meeting with "many allies and friends to strengthen our ties across the Pacific and discuss practical ways we can enhance prosperity, advance liberty, and improve our shared security" during an upcoming trip to the APEC summit.

== December ==
- December 1 – During a speech in Halifax, Bush gives praise to Canada and its people for being allies to the US both during and after the September 11 attacks.
- December 2 – President Bush denounces the delaying of elections in Iraq, saying it's time for the country's citizens to "go to the polls", when speaking to reporters at the White House.
- December 2 – First Lady Laura Bush unveils the Christmas decorations at the White House for the fourth time.
- December 3 – President Bush names Bernard Kerik as United States Secretary of Homeland Security.
- December 4 – President Bush meets with Pervez Musharraf in the Oval Office, Musharraf saying after the meeting that they discussed terrorism in its entirety and that he felt the meeting was "extremely positive".
- December 9 – President Bush announces his nomination of Jim Nicholson for United States Secretary of Veterans Affairs.
- December 10 – President Bush announces his nomination of Sam Bodman as United States Secretary of Energy in the Roosevelt Room during the morning. President Bush signs Veterans Benefits Improvement Act of 2004 into law, an act meant to benefit American veterans.
- December 11 – President Bush speaks on his health while talking to reporters during the afternoon.
- December 13 – President Bush announces the nomination of Mike Leavitt as United States Secretary of Health and Human Services in the Roosevelt Room during the morning.
- December 14 – President Bush presents the Medal of Freedom in a ceremony in the East Room during the morning.
- December 15 – President Bush speaks on the abuse of lawsuits at the Ronald Reagan Building and International Trade Center in Washington, D.C. during the afternoon.
- December 21 – President Bush and First Lady Laura Bush visit families along with their wounded service members in the family at the Walter Reed Army Medical Center.
- December 24 – President Bush calls several service members on Christmas Eve while at Camp David.
- December 26 – President Bush issues a statement expressing condolences for the deaths caused by tsunamis and earthquakes by the bay of Bengal.
- December 29 – President Bush speaks out publicly about the deaths caused by the earthquake and tsunamis in the Indian Ocean and answers questions at the Prairie Chapel Ranch.
- December 31 – President Bush announces his committing of 350 million to relief efforts for the "disaster around the Indian Ocean".

== See also ==
- Timeline of the George W. Bush presidency, for an index of the Bush presidency timeline articles

U.S. presidential administration timelines
Preceded by Bush presidency (2003)	Bush presidency (2004)	Succeeded by Bush presidency (2005)
