= Second inauguration of George W. Bush =

55th United States presidential inauguration

Second presidential inauguration of George W. Bush
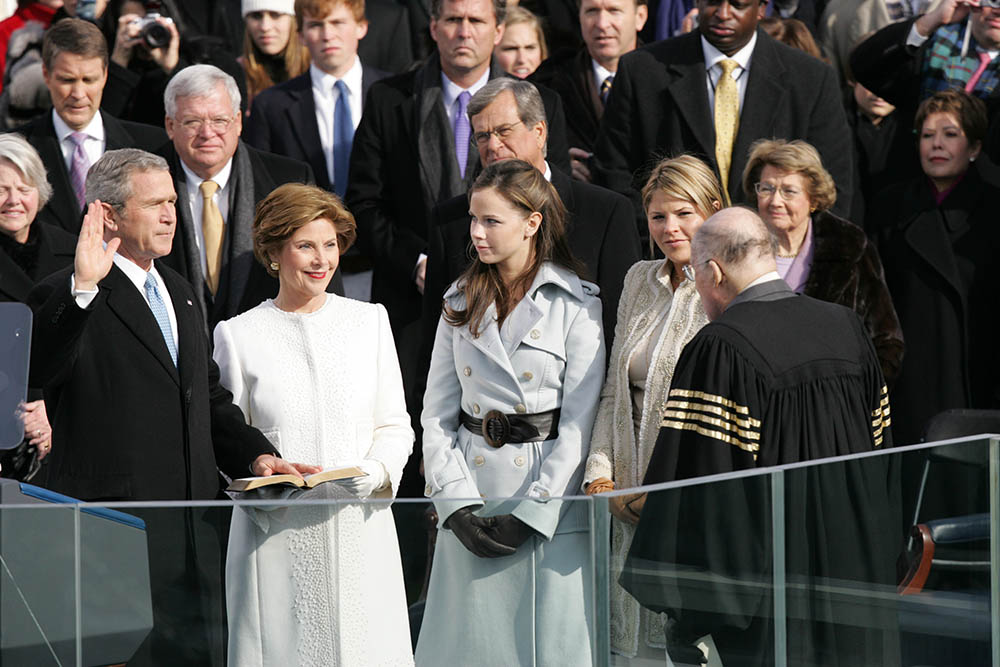
- George W. Bush takes the oath of office for his second term.
- Date: January 20, 2005; 21 years ago
- Location: United States Capitol, Washington, D.C.
- Organized by: Joint Congressional Committee on Inaugural Ceremonies.
- Participants: George W. Bush; 43rd president of the United States — Assuming office William Rehnquist; Chief Justice of the United States — Administering oath Dick Cheney; 46th vice president of the United States — Assuming office Dennis Hastert; Speaker of the United States House of Representatives — Administering oath

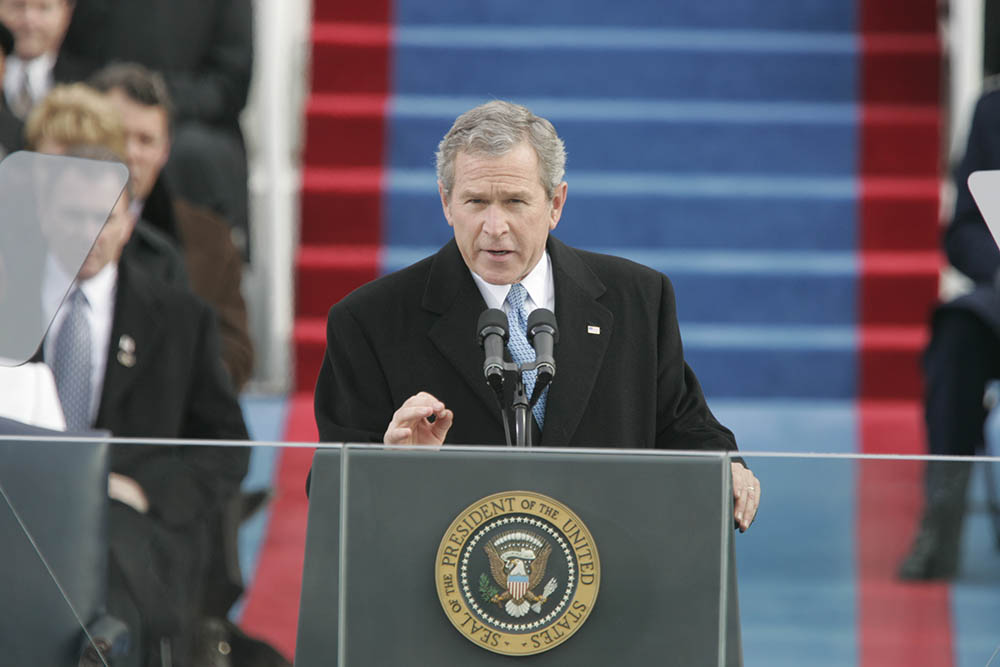
Bush delivers his second Inaugural address

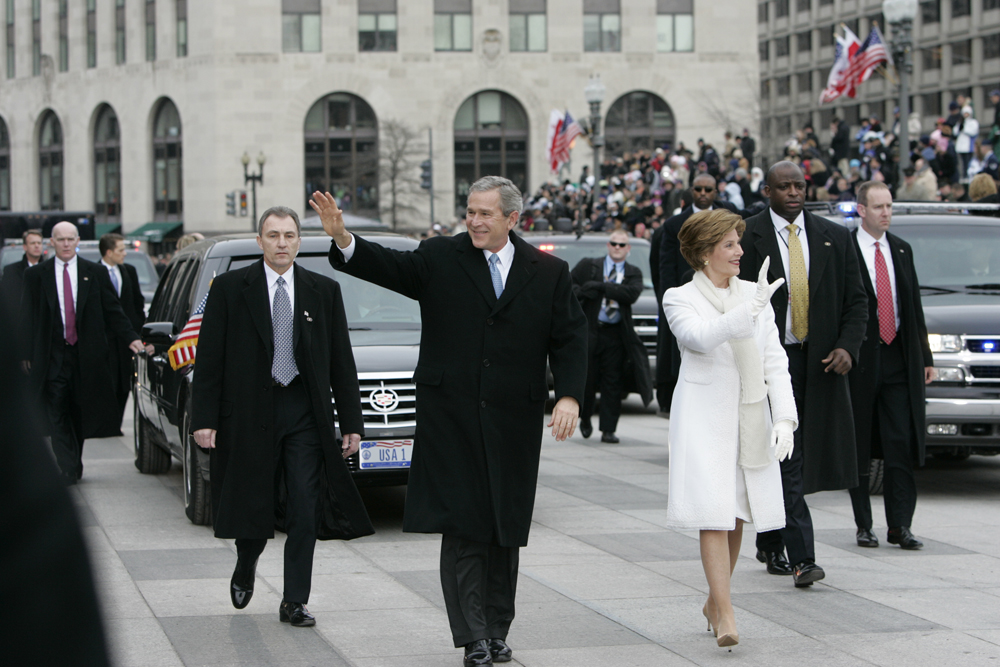
George and Laura Bush during the 2005 Inaugural Parade

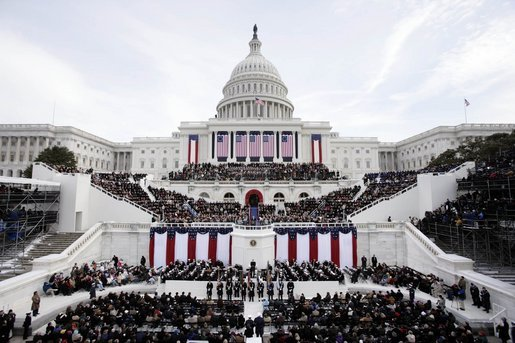
Appearance of the Capitol at the time of the investiture.

The second inauguration of George W. Bush as president of the United States took place on Thursday, January 20, 2005, at the West Front of the United States Capitol in Washington, D.C. This was the 55th inauguration and marked the beginning of the second and final term of George W. Bush as president and Dick Cheney as vice president. The ailing Chief Justice William Rehnquist seen holding a cane and his voice was stuttered, administered the presidential oath of office for the last time before his death on September 3 that year. Attendance at the inauguration has been reported variously as being around 100,000, 300,000, or 400,000. Weather conditions for 12 noon at Washington National Airport, located 3.1 miles from the ceremony, were: 35 °F (2 °C), wind 14 mph, and cloudy.

== Speech ==
Bush's inaugural address, delivered in 21 minutes, centered on and expanded upon previous foreign policy remarks concerning the promotion of democracy around the world, as well as making human rights the guiding principle of US foreign policy. According to William Safire, Bush had told his chief speechwriter, Michael Gerson, "I want this to be the freedom speech."

America's vital interests and our deepest beliefs are now one. From the day of our Founding, we have proclaimed that every man and woman on this earth has rights, and dignity, and matchless value, because they bear the image of the Maker of Heaven and earth. Across the generations we have proclaimed the imperative of self-government, because no one is fit to be a master, and no one deserves to be a slave. Advancing these ideals is the mission that created our Nation. It is the honorable achievement of our fathers. Now it is the urgent requirement of our nation's security, and the calling of our time. So it is the policy of the United States to seek and support the growth of democratic movements and institutions in every nation and culture, with the ultimate goal of ending tyranny in our world.

And later:

Today, America speaks anew to the peoples of the world: All who live in tyranny and hopelessness can know: the United States will not ignore your oppression, or excuse your oppressors. When you stand for your liberty, we will stand with you. Democratic reformers facing repression, prison, or exile can know: America sees you for who you are: the future leaders of your free country.

Combined, the speech used the words "free," "freedom," and "liberty" 49 times.

== Inaugural parade ==
During the parade there were some protests along the route, but these followed the speech and supporters far outnumbered the protesters. President Bush and the First Lady, Laura Bush, left their bullet-proof limousine and walked some of the route. Besides the usual parade formations from the United States Armed Forces, the parade also featured bands such as the Fightin' Texas Aggie Band and units such as the Governor's Guards.

== Security ==
As the first presidential inauguration after the September 11 attacks, security was tighter than previous ceremonies. The inaugural parade route as well as other related sites were guarded by 13,000 police and soldiers, in addition to aerial patrols by helicopter and fighter aircraft and rooftop sharpshooters. In downtown Washington, a 100 square block area was closed to traffic.

The Handshake Man was also intercepted for the first time and was arrested on an outstanding warrant related to his prior presidential photo stunts.

== Protests ==
Many protested at the ceremonies and five people were arrested during the inauguration ceremony.

Protestors worked to block access to the actual swearing in ceremony. Tickets were given out only by state senators and representatives, and a few RNC officials. Ticketholders, who were from all over the country, were advised not to bring backpacks or bags, and were told such items wouldn't be allowed through security. Protestors obtained tickets, and then brought large bags to the event, clogging security checkpoints. Rather than directing all bag holders to one security screening line, security officials allowed the lines to be clogged, preventing many people from entering the secured area to view/hear President Bush and Vice-President Cheney.

== See also ==
- Presidency of George W. Bush
- First inauguration of George W. Bush
- Timeline of the George W. Bush presidency (2005)
- 2004 United States presidential election
- George W. Bush 2004 presidential campaign
