= Timeline of the George W. Bush presidency (2008–2009) =

The following is a timeline of the presidency of George W. Bush, from January 1, 2008 to January 20, 2009.

== January 2008 ==
- January 1 – At Texas State Technical College, President Bush and First Lady Laura Bush wish Americans "a happy and healthy 2008."
- January 2 – President Bush announces his intent to nominate Jamsheed K. Choksy, Dawn Ho Delbanco, Gary D. Glenn, David Hertz, Marvin Bailey Scott, and Carol M. Swain as members of the National Council on the Humanities for terms lasting six years, and Jan Cellucci, William J. Hagenah, and Mark Y. Herring as members of the National Museum and Library Services board for terms lasting five years.
- January 3 – United States National Security Advisor Stephen Hadley announces Bush will travel to the Middle East in five days to give President Bush a chance "to discuss with Israelis and Palestinians their efforts toward a negotiated peace and achievement of the President's vision of two democratic states, Israel and Palestine, living side by side in peace and security."
- January 4 – President Bush signs S. 2436 for the establishment of commencement of Commissioner of Internal Revenue terms to have a designated date.
- January 7 – President Bush delivers an address at Horace Greeley Elementary School in Chicago, Illinois during the morning.
- January 8 – President Bush releases a statement noting that the following day will be the third anniversary of the signing of the comprehensive peace agreement in Sudan and states the commitment on the part of the US to continuing to adhere to the agreement.
- January 8 – President Bush meets with Turkish President Abdullah Gül in the Oval Office. President Bush also emphasized his support for Turkey's accession to the European Union.
- January 9 – President Bush attends the welcoming ceremony at the Ben Gurion International Airport in Tel Aviv, Israel during the afternoon.
- January 10 – President Bush delivers an address at the King David Hotel on the peace process in the Middle East during the afternoon.
- January 11 – President Bush visits Yad Vashem during the morning, saying that he hopes those who visit will have "a sobering reminder that evil exists and a call that when we find evil, we must resist it."
- January 28 – President Bush delivers his final State of the Union Address before a joint session of Congress.
- January 30 – President Bush delivers an address on trade and the economy at the Robinson Helicopter Company in Torrance, California during the morning. President Bush authorizes federal aid to the state of Indiana after declaring the existence of a major disaster there.
- January 31 – President Bush gives a speech on international collaboration against terrorism at Emerald at Queensridge in Las Vegas, Nevada during the morning. President Bush signs the Protect America Act Extension, giving the Protect America Act authority until the upcoming February 16.

== February ==
- February 1 – President Bush signs a proclamation declaring February as "American Heart Month" at the Intercontinental Hotel and delivers an economic speech at Hallmark Cards, Inc. in Kansas City, Missouri during the morning. First Lady Laura Bush discusses American Heart Month in a radio address.
- February 4 – President Bush meets with his cabinet for discussions on the budget in the Cabinet Room during the morning.
- February 26 – President Bush gives an address on his African trip to the Leon H. Sullivan Foundation at Marriot Wardham Park Hotel in D.C. during the morning.
- February 27 – President Bush meets with Prime Minister of the Czech Republic Mirek Topolánek in the Oval Office during the morning. President Bush announces Sada Cumber as Presidential Envoy to the Organization of Islamic Conference in the Oval Office and meets with 2007 World Champion Boston Red Sox in the South Lawn during the afternoon.
- February 28 – President Bush holds a news conference and meets with members of his economic group at the U.S. Department of Labor in Washington, D.C. during the morning.
- February 29 – President Bush holds an Oval Office meeting with Secretary General of NATO Jaap de Hoop Scheffer to discuss Afghanistan during the morning. President Bush signs the Andean Trade Preference Extension Act of 2008, extending the Andean Trade Extension Act through the upcoming December 31, and H.R. 5478, allowing $1 coins to continue minting throughout 2008. President Bush proclaims March 2008 as "Irish-American Heritage Month".

== April ==
- April 1 – President Bush holds a joint press conference with President of Ukraine Viktor Yushchenko at the House of Chimaeras in Kyiv, Ukraine.
- April 4 – Noting the fortieth anniversary of the 1968 assassination of Martin Luther King Jr., Bush laments that America was "robbed of one of history's most consequential advocates for equality and civil rights" and calls for both mourning of King's death and celebrating his preaching of "justice and hope" in a statement.
- April 5 – In Croatia, President Bush meets with Prime Minister of Croatia Sanader.
- April 26 – President Bush attends the White House Correspondents' Association at the Washington Hilton Hotel in D.C. during the evening. President Bush speaks about the hardships students presently have in acquiring higher forms of education and the policies enacted by the Department of Education in response to this during his radio address.
- April 28 – President Bush meets with President of Guatemala Alvaro Colom in the Oval Office during the morning for discussions on relations between their countries, the effectiveness of CAFTA, reforms presently being put in place by the Guatemalan government, and immigration.
- April 29 – President Bush holds a press conference in the Rose Garden during the morning. President Bush meets with United Nations Special Representative to Afghanistan Kai Eide in the Oval Office and delivers a speech on National Volunteer Week in the East Room during the afternoon.
- April 30 – President Bush hosts a ceremony for the Welcomes 2008 National and State Teachers of the Year in the Rose Garden during the morning. He welcomes the New York Giants, winners of Super Bowl XLII, in the South Lawn during the afternoon.

== August ==
- August 2 – President Bush discusses gas prices and the effectiveness of Congress in dealing with the issue during his radio address.
- August 4 – President Bush delivers a speech at the Eielson Air Force Base in Alaska during the afternoon.
- August 5 – President Bush announces his nomination of Mark V. Rosenker for Vice Chairman of the National Transportation Safety Board.
- August 6 – President Bush meets with Prime Minister of Thailand Samak Sundaravej in the Government House in Bangkok, Thailand during the evening.

== September ==
- September 24 – President Bush delivers an address to the nation from the White House on the 2008 financial crisis.
- September 29 – President Bush delivers an address on financial reform in South Drive during the morning.
- September 30 – President Bush delivers a speech on the economy during the morning. President Bush signs the Need-Based Educational Aid Act of 2008 and the Federal Aviation Administration Extension Act of 2008 into law. President Bush announces his nomination of Robert W. McGowan to be Governor of the Board of Governors of the United States Postal Service and the nomination is sent to the Senate.

== October ==
- October 1 – President Bush meets with General David McKiernan in the Oval Office at the White House. President Bush gives public brief remarks on the meeting during the afternoon hours.
- October 2 – President Bush meets with American business representatives at the Dwight D. Eisenhower Executive Office Building to discuss the Economic Rescue Package, saying afterward, "the House of Representatives must listen to these voices and get this bill passed so we can get about the business of restoring confidence."
- October 3 – President Bush signs the Emergency Economic Stabilization Act of 2008.
- October 4 – President Bush visits his childhood home in Midland, Texas and reflects on his past.
- October 6 – President Bush delivers a speech on the administration's judicial appointments accomplishments and the economy at the Hilton Cincinnati Netherland Plaza in Cincinnati, Ohio.
- October 27 – President Bush meets with President of Paraguay Fernando Lugo in the Oval Office during the morning.
- October 29 – President Bush holds a morning meeting with President of Iraqi Kurdistan Masoud Barzani in the Oval Office.
- October 30 – President Bush delivers an address at the graduation ceremony for Federal Bureau of Investigation Special Agents at the FBI Academy in Quantico, Virginia during the morning.

== November ==
- November 4 – The 2008 United States presidential election takes place. The Democratic Party presidential nominee Barack Obama becomes president-elect after defeating the Republican Party presidential nominee John McCain.
- November 4 – The Democratic Party retains their majorities in the House of Representatives and the Senate.
- November 10 – President Bush meets with President-elect Barack Obama in the Oval Office to discuss the transition of power between the presidents. White House spokesman Dana Perino describes the meeting as "friendly" and "relaxed".
- November 27 – President Bush favorably comments on the Iraq Council of Representatives approving the Strategic Framework and Security Agreements with the US: "Two years ago, this day seemed unlikely - but the success of the surge and the courage of the Iraqi people set the conditions for these two agreements to be negotiated and approved by the Iraqi parliament."
- November 28 – President Bush issues a statement expressing sadness at the loss of American and foreign lives lost in the Mumbai attacks.
- November 29 – President Bush condemns the attacks in Mumbai, India while speaking on the South Lawn of the White House during the afternoon.

== December ==
- December 1 – President Bush delivers a speech on World AIDS Day in the North Lawn during the morning. President and First Lady Bush speak at a forum on Global Health at Newseum in Washington, D.C. during the morning. President Bush signs the United States Army Commemorative Coin Act of 2008. It requires the Treasury Department to mint and issue coins for the recognition of the US Army being founded in 1775 as well as commemorating the event.
- December 3 – First Lady Laura Bush unveils the Christmas decorations at the White House for the eighth and final time.
- December 4 – President Bush attends that year's National Christmas Tree lighting ceremony.
- December 5 – President Bush delivers a speech on the economy on the South Lawn.
- December 6 – President Bush attends the unveiling of a portrait of himself at the Union League of Philadelphia in Philadelphia, Pennsylvania and delivers a speech.
- December 8 – President and First Lady Bush act as hosts for the White House Children's Holiday Reception and Performance in the East Room during the morning. President Bush attends several briefings while in the office of the Director of National Intelligence and the National Counterterrorism Center in the afternoon.
- December 9 – President Bush delivers an address on the evolution of American defense at the United States Military Academy in West Point, New York during the morning. President Bush issues a statement on Zimbabwe renewing his call for the removal of the leadership of Robert Mugabe.
- December 16 – President Bush meets with President of El Salvador Antonio Saca in the Oval Office of the White House.
- December 17 – President Bush gives a speech at the U.S. Army War College in Carlisle, Pennsylvania during the afternoon. President Bush designates the day as "Wright Brothers Day".
- December 18 – President Bush delivers a speech to the American Enterprise Institute at the Renaissance Mayflower Hotel in Washington, D.C. during the morning.
- December 19 – President Bush delivers a speech on auto companies in the Roosevelt Room during the morning. President Bush meets with President of the State of Palestine Mahmoud Abbas in the Oval Office of the White House during the afternoon.
- December 20 – President Bush discusses auto companies during his radio address.
- December 22 – President Bush travels to Walter Reed Army Medical Center.
- December 23 – President Bush discusses the history of volunteering for the military during his radio address.
- December 24 – On Christmas Eve, President Bush calls members of the military.
- December 30 – President Bush issues a statement on National Mentoring Month.
- December 31 – President Bush issues a proclamation extending duty-free treatment to various agricultural and other programs in Israel.

== January 2009 ==
- January 3 – The 111th United States Congress convenes with the Democratic Party is retaining their majorities in the House of Representatives and the Senate.
- January 3 – Nancy Pelosi is re-elected as Speaker of the United States House of Representatives.
- January 6 – In a joint session of the United States Congress, the results for the electoral college are counted. In his role as President of the Senate, Vice President Dick Cheney reads the results and declares President-elect Barack Obama as the winner of the 2008 presidential election.
- January 10 – President Bush attends the commissioning of the USS George H.W. Bush in Norfolk, Virginia with his father, former President George H. W. Bush.
- January 13 – President Bush holds his last cabinet meeting in the Cabinet Room, Bush noting accomplishments of the group, during the morning.
- January 15 – President Bush delivers his farewell address in the East Room of the White House.
- January 19 — President Bush made phone calls to former and then leaders on his final day in office as president as he prepares to leave for Barack Obama’s inauguration
- January 20 – President Bush receives and greets President-elect Barack Obama, who arrived at the White House, for the formal transition of power in the United States. He is accompanied by First Lady Laura Bush.
- January 20 – Vice President Dick Cheney receives and greets Vice President-elect Joe Biden, who arrived at the White House. During the ceremony, he is accompanied by the second lady Lynne Cheney.
- January 20 – President Bush completes his two terms in office and leaves the White House for the final time as Commander-in-chief.
- January 20 – Barack Obama is inaugurated as the 44th president of the United States, at noon EST.
- January 20 – After the inauguration, Bush, now the former president, returns to his Prairie Chapel Ranch in Crawford to begin his post-presidency.

== See also ==
- Timeline of the George W. Bush presidency, for an index of the Bush presidency timeline articles

U.S. presidential administration timelines
Preceded by Bush presidency (2007)	Bush presidency (2008–2009)	Succeeded by Obama presidency (2009)
