= Timeline of the Barack Obama presidency (2009) =

The following is a timeline of Barack Obama's presidency from his inauguration as the 44th president of the United States on January 20, 2009, to December 31, 2009. For his time as president-elect, see the presidential transition of Barack Obama; for a detailed account of his first months in office, see first 100 days of the Obama presidency; for a complete itinerary of his travels, see list of presidential trips made by Barack Obama.

== January ==
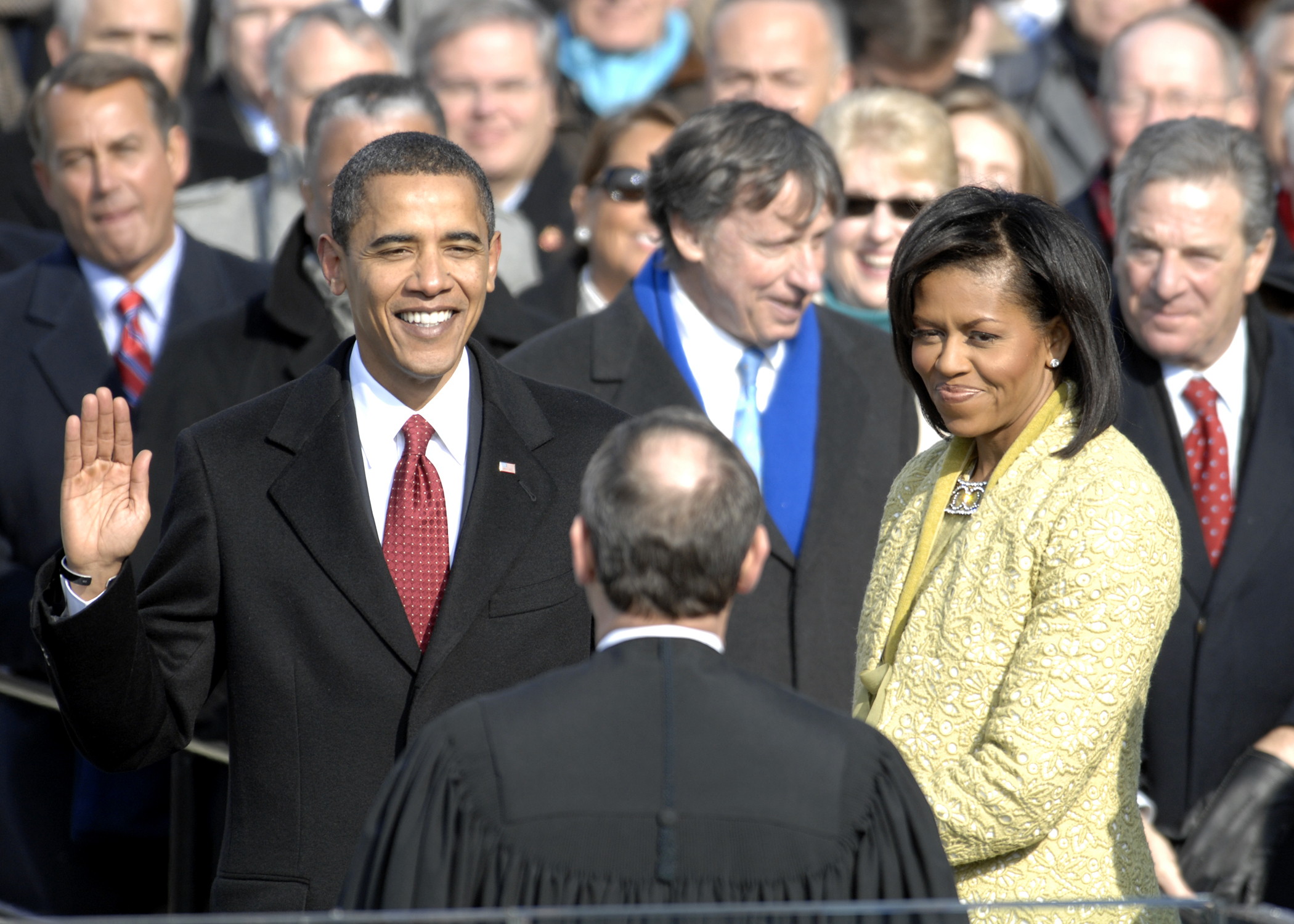
Barack Obama is inaugurated as the 44th president of the United States

- January 20 – Barack Obama's presidency begins with his inauguration at the United States Capitol in Washington, D.C.; the oath of office is administered by Chief Justice John Roberts. Obama's Chief of Staff, Rahm Emanuel, issues an order suspending last-minute federal regulations pushed through by outgoing President George W. Bush, planning to review everything still pending. In one of his first official acts, President Obama issues a proclamation declaring January 20, 2009 a National Day of Renewal and Reconciliation. President Obama enacts a pay freeze for Senior White House Staff making more than $100,000 per year and announces stricter guidelines regarding lobbyists in an effort to raise the ethical standards of the White House.
- January 21 – President Obama revokes Executive Order 13233, which had been initiated by the Bush administration to limit access to the records of former presidents. At 7:35 pm EST on January 21, President Obama retakes the Presidential Oath of Office, again administered by Chief Justice John G. Roberts, before four print journalists. President Obama issues instructions to all agencies and departments in his administration to "adopt a presumption in favor" of Freedom of Information Act requests, reversing earlier policy set by former Attorney General John Ashcroft. The president issues an executive order entitled "Ethics Commitments by Executive Branch Personnel", governing the limitations on hiring of employees by the executive branch to qualified individuals only, and placing very tight restrictions on lobbying in the White House.
- January 22 – President Obama signs an executive order announcing the closure of the Guantanamo Bay detention camp within a year, and signs a prohibition on using torture and other illegal coercive techniques, such as waterboarding, during interrogations and detentions, requiring the Army field manual to be used as a guide.
- January 23 – President Obama ends the funding ban for groups that provide abortion services or counseling abroad, also known as the "gag rule" or the Mexico City Policy. He orders the first two Predator airstrikes of his presidency. (See Airstrikes in Pakistan).

Obama presents his first weekly address as President, discussing the American Recovery and Reinvestment Act of 2009.

- January 24 – President Obama produces his first weekly Saturday morning video address available on whitehouse.gov and YouTube, (like those released during his transition period) a policy compared to Franklin D. Roosevelt's fireside chats.
- January 26 – President Obama signs his first two Presidential Memoranda concerning energy independence, directing the U.S. Department of Transportation to establish higher fuel efficiency standards before 2011 models are released and the allowing states to raise their emissions standards above the national standard. That night he gives his first formal interview as president to Al Arabiya.
- January 28 – President Obama makes his first visit to The Pentagon as president, meeting with Defense Secretary Robert Gates and the Joint Chiefs of Staff.
- January 29 – President Obama signs his first bill, the Lilly Ledbetter Fair Pay Act, which promotes fair pay regardless of sex, race, or age. Lilly Ledbetter, the plaintiff in the employment discrimination case Ledbetter v. Goodyear Tire & Rubber Co. joined Barack and Michelle Obama at the signing ceremony. A military judge at Guantanamo Bay, in the case of Abd al-Rahim al-Nashiri, rejects the White House's request to suspend Guantanamo Bay military commission proceedings for 120 days.
- January 30 – President Obama signs a presidential memorandum launching the Middle Class Working Families Task Force to be led by Vice President Joe Biden.
- January 31 – President Obama speaks at the Alfalfa Club annual banquet.

== February ==
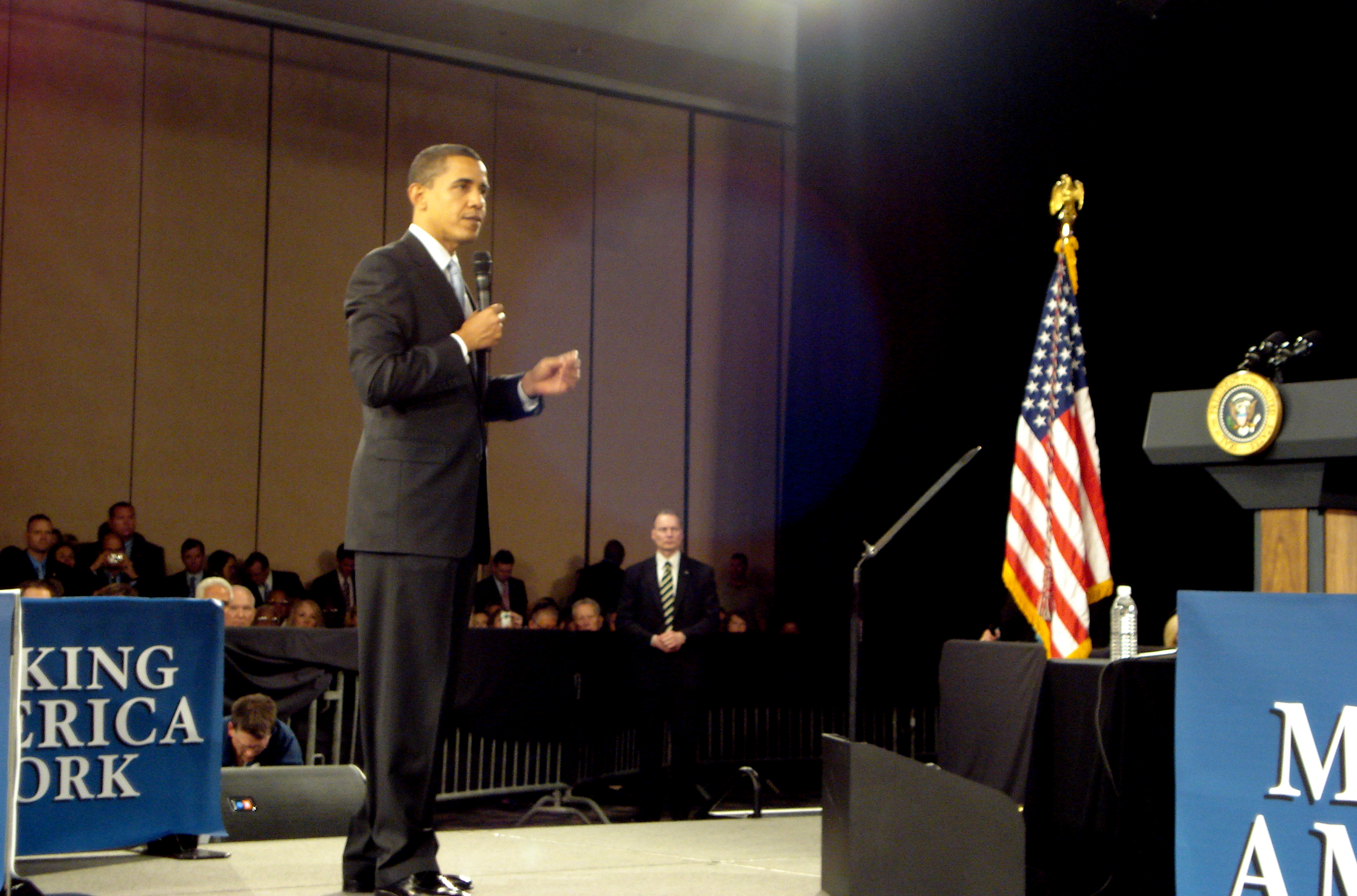
Barack Obama visiting Fort Myers on February 10

- February 3 – President Obama nominates Senator Judd Gregg to be Secretary of Commerce, after Bill Richardson withdrew his nomination. Tom Daschle withdraws his nomination for Secretary of Health and Human Services, and Nancy Killefer withdraws her nomination as Chief Performance Officer, both citing tax problems. President Obama grants five television interviews accepting responsibility for the nomination mistakes and talks about the economic stimulus bill.
- February 4 – President Obama announces that companies receiving large amounts of federal bailout money through the Troubled Assets Relief Program (TARP) must cap top executive pay at US$500,000. President Obama signs the Children's Health Insurance Program Reauthorization Act of 2009 reauthorizing and expanding the Children's Health Insurance Program (CHIP). Secretary of the Interior Ken Salazar cancels 77 leases sold by the previous administration to oil and gas companies, while letting 39 leases stand.
- February 5 – President Obama speaks at the National Prayer Breakfast. The Washington Post publishes an op-ed by President Obama entitled "The Action Americans Need", which deals with the American Recovery and Reinvestment Act of 2009. He also takes his first trip as president on Air Force One to Williamsburg, Virginia. President Obama overhauls the Office of Faith-Based and Community Initiatives, renaming it the White House Office of Faith-Based and Neighborhood Partnerships.
- February 6 – President Obama announces the creation of the President's Economic Recovery Advisory Board. President Obama also issues an executive order backing the use of union labor for large-scale federal construction projects.
- February 7 – Vice President Biden makes the administration's first major foreign policy speech at the Munich Security Conference. Barack, Michelle, Malia and Sasha Obama make their first trip to Camp David.
- February 9 – President Obama travels to Elkhart, Indiana to discuss the American Recovery and Reinvestment Act of 2009, and returns to the White House to give his first nationally televised press conference.
- February 10 – President Obama travels to Fort Myers, Florida to discuss the Recovery and Reinvestment Act and the area's unemployment problems, and is joined by Governor Charlie Crist. Secretary of the Interior Ken Salazar temporarily halts a Bush midnight regulation that opens the Outer Continental Shelf to offshore drilling for oil and gas.
- February 11 – President Obama promotes his economic stimulus plan at a construction site in Springfield, Virginia with then-DNC Chairman and former Virginia governor Tim Kaine.
- February 12 – President Obama travels to Springfield, Illinois to celebrate the 200th anniversary of the birth of President Abraham Lincoln, and speaks at a Lincoln Bicentennial Celebration. Judd Gregg, President Obama's nominee for the office of Commerce Secretary withdraws his nomination for that office.
- February 13 – The First Family spends a weekend in their former home of Chicago, Illinois.
- February 15–22 – Hillary Clinton travels to Asia on her first trip abroad as Secretary of State, visiting Tokyo, Jakarta, Seoul, and Beijing.
- February 17 – The White House launches Recovery.gov to explain the American Recovery and Reinvestment Act of 2009, including a video address from President Obama. President Obama signs into law the $787 billion Recovery and Reinvestment Act in Denver, Colorado. The president also approves a deployment of 17,000 additional troops to Afghanistan.

Address Before a Joint Session of Congress (February 24, 2009) (52:20)
Barack Obama's February 24, 2009 Address Before a Joint Session of Congress

Address Before a Joint Session of Congress (February 24, 2009) (audio)
Audio-only version

- February 19 – President Obama makes his first trip abroad as president to Ottawa, Ontario, Canada, where he meets with Governor General Michaëlle Jean, Prime Minister Stephen Harper and Leader of the Opposition Michael Ignatieff about environmental issues, the North American Free Trade Agreement (NAFTA), and other US-Canadian relations.
- February 21 – The Department of Justice rules that detainees at the Bagram Air Base in Afghanistan do not have the right to use U.S. courts to challenge their detention, upholding the Bush administration's position on the issue.
- February 23 – Attorney General Eric Holder, charged with overseeing the closure of the Guantanamo Bay Detention Camp, visits the facility. Dennis Ross is appointed as the Secretary of State's special adviser for the gulf and Southwest Asia.
- February 24 – President Obama delivers an address before a joint session of the members of Congress outlining his administration goals. Louisiana Governor Bobby Jindal gives the Republican response. Japanese prime minister Taro Aso also meets with President Obama at the White House.
- February 25 – The United States Senate confirms Hilda Solis as United States Secretary of Labor. President Obama nominates former Governor of Washington Gary Locke to become United States Secretary of Commerce. The Secretary of the Interior cancels leases for oil shale development on 1,900,000 acres (7,700 km^{2}) of federal land in Colorado, Utah and Wyoming.
- February 26 – President Obama reveals his proposal for the 2010 United States federal budget.
- February 27 – President Obama delivers a speech at Camp Lejeune on his plans for troop withdrawals from Iraq. The Obama administration through the Department of Health and Human Services starts the process to repeal or modify a "midnight rule" conceived to protect health workers who refuse for conscience reasons to provide health care.

== March ==
- March 1–7 – Secretary of State Clinton leaves on her second foreign trip to Egypt, Israel, the Palestinian Territories, Belgium, Switzerland, and Turkey.
- March 2 – Secretary of State Clinton pledges US$900 million of humanitarian and development aid to the Gaza Strip and West Bank at a donor conference in Sharm el-Sheik. President Obama nominates Kansas Governor Kathleen Sebelius to be Secretary of Health and Human Services and appoints Nancy-Ann DeParle as White House health czar.

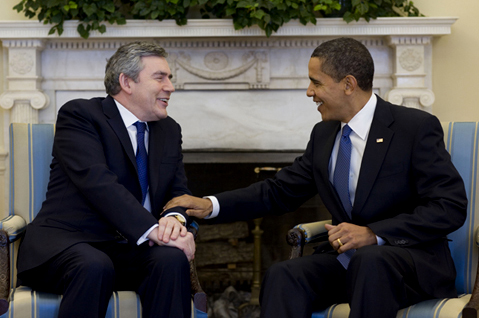
Obama meets with British prime minister Gordon Brown.

- March 3 – British prime minister Gordon Brown visits President Obama at the White House. President Obama restores a provision of the Endangered Species Act requiring that federal agencies consult the United States Fish and Wildlife Service and/or the National Marine Fisheries Service before taking actions that could harm endangered species.
- March 4 – President Obama issues a memorandum limiting the possibility to grant no-bid contracts to private businesses.
- March 5 – Sanjay Gupta withdraws his name for Surgeon General. Vivek Kundra is selected by President Obama as first Federal Chief Information Officer.
- March 6 – President Obama visits Columbus, Ohio to deliver a speech at the graduation of Columbus Police Division's 114th class.
- March 9 – President Obama overturns rules limiting federal money being used for human embryonic stem cell research. The president also orders all executive officials to consult with the Attorney General before relying on any signing statement previously used to bypass a statute. The Office of Management and Budget has given the Pentagon directives to delay procurement of aerial refueling tankers by five years and cancel plans for a new long-range bomber.
- March 10 – President Obama delivers a major policy speech on education, and holds his first meeting as president with UN Secretary General Ban Ki-moon. Chas Freeman withdraws from his appointment as chairman of the National Intelligence Council.
- March 11 – The president signs the Omnibus Appropriations Act of 2009; on the same occasion he issues his first signing statement. Vice President Biden announces the nomination of Seattle Police Chief Gil Kerlikowske as "Drug Czar" and head of the Office of National Drug Control Policy. President Obama creates (by executive order) a White House Council on Women and Girls to be chaired by Valerie Jarrett to assure cabinet-level agencies coordinate policies and programs that affect women and families. President Obama officially announces Lt. Gen. Karl Eikenberry and Christopher R. Hill Ambassadors respectively to Afghanistan and Iraq.
- March 12 – President Obama renews economic sanctions against Iran first imposed in 1995. Mrs. Obama visits Fort Bragg, North Carolina on her first solo trip outside of the capital as First Lady.
- March 13 – The Department of Justice outlines a new legal standard for detaining the suspected terrorists held at Guantanamo; "enemy combatant" definition is dropped, and suspects shall be detained under international law.

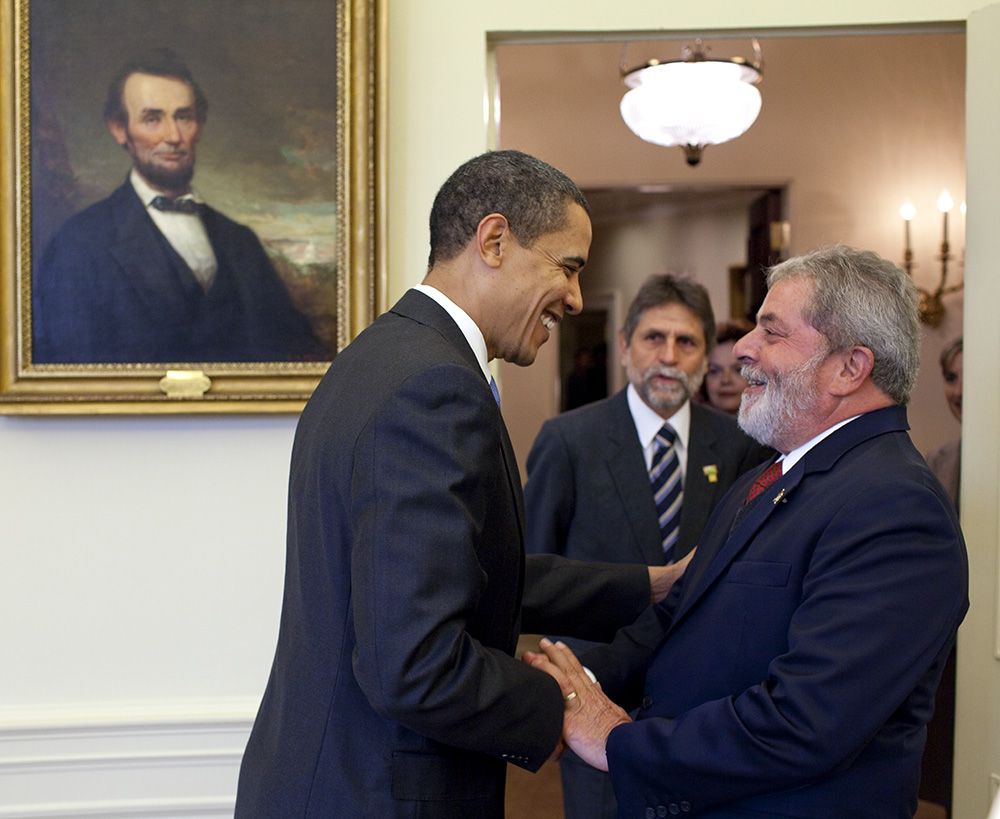
Obama meets with Brazilian President Luiz Inácio Lula da Silva.

- March 14 – President Obama meets Brazilian president Luiz Inácio Lula da Silva at the White House. President Obama visits Rio Rancho High School (near Albuquerque, New Mexico) to discuss credit card reform. President Obama announces the nomination of Margaret A. Hamburg to become Commissioner of the U.S. Food and Drug Administration.
- March 17 – President Obama meets with the Taoiseach Brian Cowen of Ireland, and the First Minister Peter Robinson of Northern Ireland.
- March 18 – President Obama speaks at a town hall meeting in Costa Mesa, California. The United States Senate confirms Ron Kirk, former Mayor of Dallas, as United States Trade Representative.
- March 19 – President Obama appears on The Tonight Show with Jay Leno. Just before midnight President Obama releases a video message to the Iranian people and government to coincide with Nowruz.
- March 20 – President Obama and Vice President Biden meet with former Soviet leader Mikhail Gorbachev in Washington.
- March 23 – Treasury Secretary Timothy Geithner unveils the government's plan to help investors purchase toxic assets from banks.
- March 24 – President Obama holds his second prime time press conference in the East Room of the White House, to discuss economic hardships, as well as the government's intentions to solve the global economic crisis. Also, the United States Senate confirms Gary Locke, former governor of Washington, as United States Secretary of Commerce.
- March 25 – President Obama meets with Australian prime minister Kevin Rudd. President Obama also meets with Jaap de Hoop Scheffer, the Secretary General of NATO, to discuss the upcoming summit, relations with Russia, and the future of NATO.
- March 25–26 – Secretary of State Clinton travels to Mexico City and Monterrey, Mexico to discuss US collaboration in the Mérida Initiative.

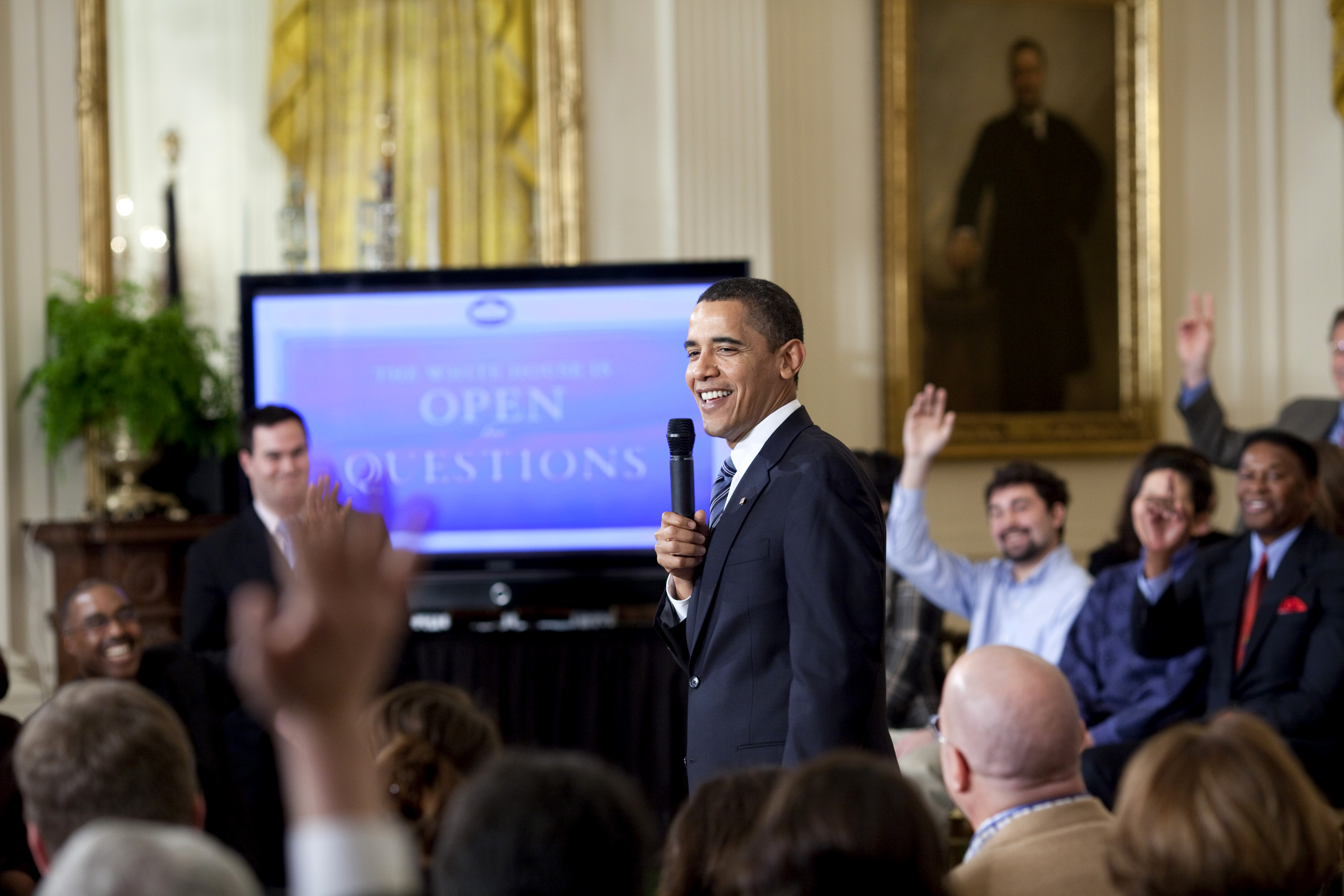
Obama answers questions in the first online town hall meeting.

- March 26 – President Obama holds an online town hall at the White House, a historic first in American Presidential conveyance.
- March 27 – President Obama announces a new strategy for the war in Afghanistan and Pakistan.
- March 27–30 – Vice President Biden travelled to Latin America, visiting Chile and Costa Rica. The president attended the Progressive Governance conference in Chile, along with the presidents of Argentina, Brazil, Chile and Uruguay, and the prime ministers of the United Kingdom and Norway.
- March 30 – President Obama announces new plans and restructuring ultimatums for Chrysler and General Motors. Obama signs the Omnibus Public Land Management Act into law.
- March 31 – The president and first lady arrive in London for G20 meeting with World Leaders.

== April ==
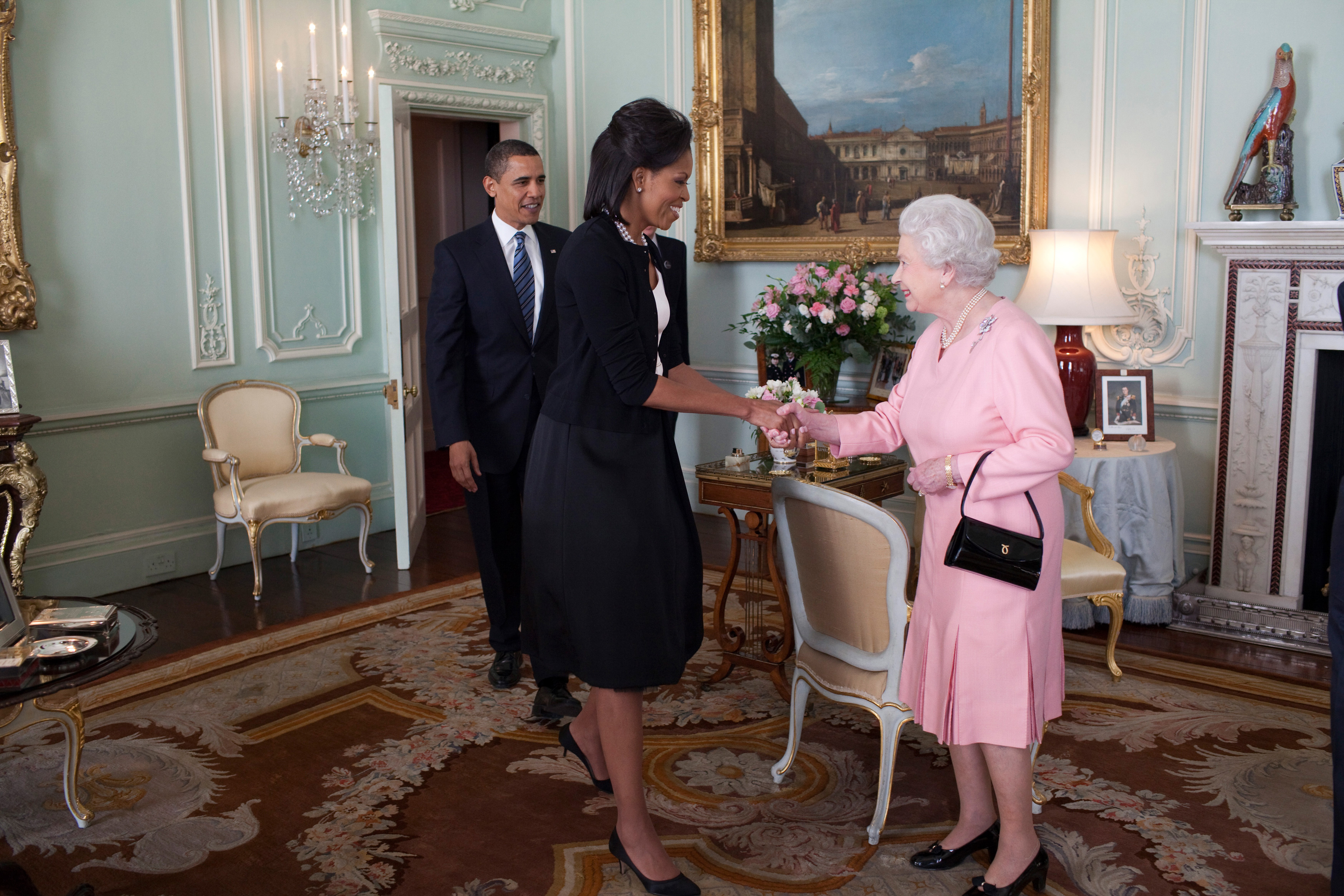
Barack and Michelle Obama meeting Queen Elizabeth II at Buckingham Palace.

- April 1 – President Obama meets British prime minister Gordon Brown, Russian president Dmitri Medvedev, Chinese president Hu Jintao, and Queen Elizabeth II.
- April 2 – The G-20 summit begins in London, England. The president announces Robert Groves to be his candidate for director of The Census Bureau
- April 3 – President Obama meets French president Nicolas Sarkozy and holds a town hall meeting with French and German students.
- April 3–4 – President Obama attends the two-day NATO summit in Strasbourg, France, and Kehl and Baden-Baden, Germany.
- April 5 – President Obama meets with Czech president Václav Klaus and Prime Minister Mirek Topolánek. The president gives a thoughtful speech on nuclear proliferation disarmament to a public crowd in Prague. Earlier the North Korean government had launched a long-range multi-stage rocket.
- April 6–7 – President Obama visits Istanbul and Ankara, Turkey, including a meeting at the Alliance of Civilizations forum. President Obama emphasized his support for accession of Turkey the European Union as soon as possible.

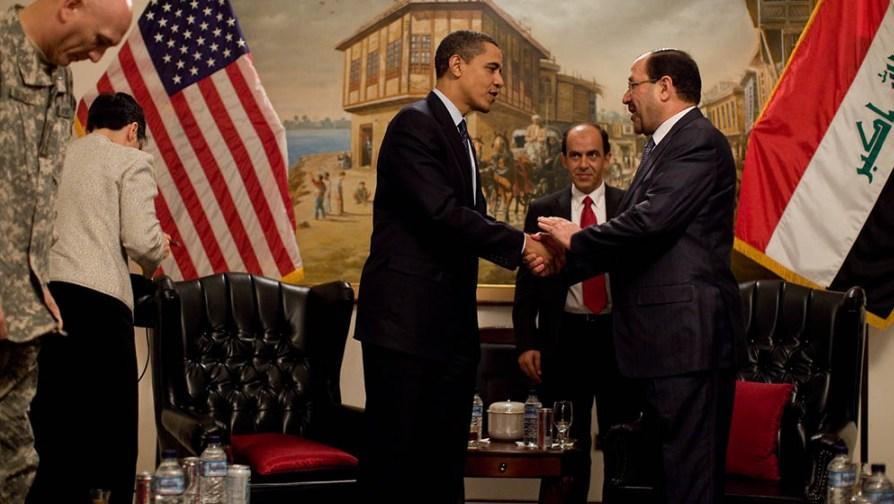
Obama meets Iraqi President Nouri al-Maliki in Baghdad.

- April 7 – President Obama finishes his trip in Istanbul, including a town hall meeting, and makes a surprise visit to Baghdad, Iraq (his first as president), where he meets with Iraqi prime minister Nouri al-Maliki.
- April 9 – In a presidential first, President Obama hosts a White House Passover Seder for the second night of Passover.
- April 12 – Richard Phillips, captured by pirates in the Maersk Alabama hijacking, is freed by Navy Seals after President Obama approves military action.
- April 13 – President Obama signs a presidential memorandum eliminating limits on Cuban-Americans governing family visits and remittances sent to the island.
- April 14 – The Philadelphia Phillies, scheduled to meet with President Obama after winning the 2008 World Series, postpone their meeting after the death of Phillies announcer Harry Kalas. President Obama gives a speech on his economic policies at Georgetown University.
- April 16 – Four memos are released by the Justice Department on enhanced interrogation techniques used by the CIA on Al Qaeda suspects.

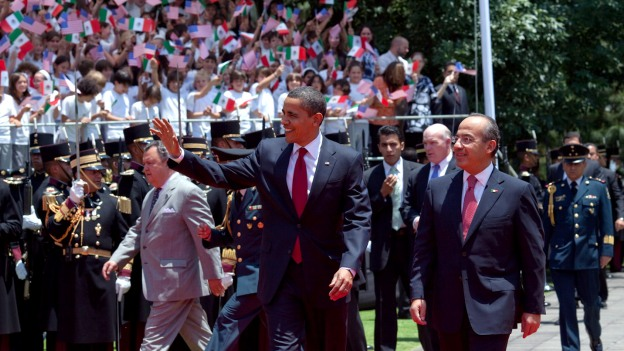
Obama with Calderon in Mexico City.

- April 16–17 – President Obama visits Mexico to meet with President Felipe Calderón. President Obama states the US is a "full partner" with Mexico in its fight against the Mexican drug cartels.
- April 17–19 – President Obama attends the 5th Summit of the Americas in Port of Spain, Trinidad and Tobago.
- April 21 – President Obama meets with King Abdullah II of Jordan in a one-on-one meeting in the White House. President Obama also signs the Edward M. Kennedy Serve America Act into law. President Obama also speaks to CIA staff.
- April 23 – President Obama speaks at a Holocaust remembrance ceremony at the capitol sponsored by the National Holocaust Museum.
- April 27 – President Obama addresses the National Academy of Sciences and announces that more than 3 percent of the GDP will be devoted to research and development. He also announces a doubling of the budgets of NSF and NIST, and a goal of reducing carbon pollution by more than 80 percent by 2050.
- April 28 – The United States Senate confirms Kathleen Sebelius, former governor of Kansas, as United States Secretary of Health and Human Services.
- April 29 – President Obama meets the Media in a primetime news conference, to discuss the first 100 days of his presidency, and the plans already implemented that will continue into the rest of his term.

== May ==
- May 4 – President Obama marks Cinco de Mayo a day early in a small speech to Latino Americans. President Obama was joined by First Lady Michelle Obama, Vice President Joe Biden, Second Lady Jill Biden, United States Ambassador to Mexico Arturo Sarukhan and his wife Veronica Valenca-Sarukhan.

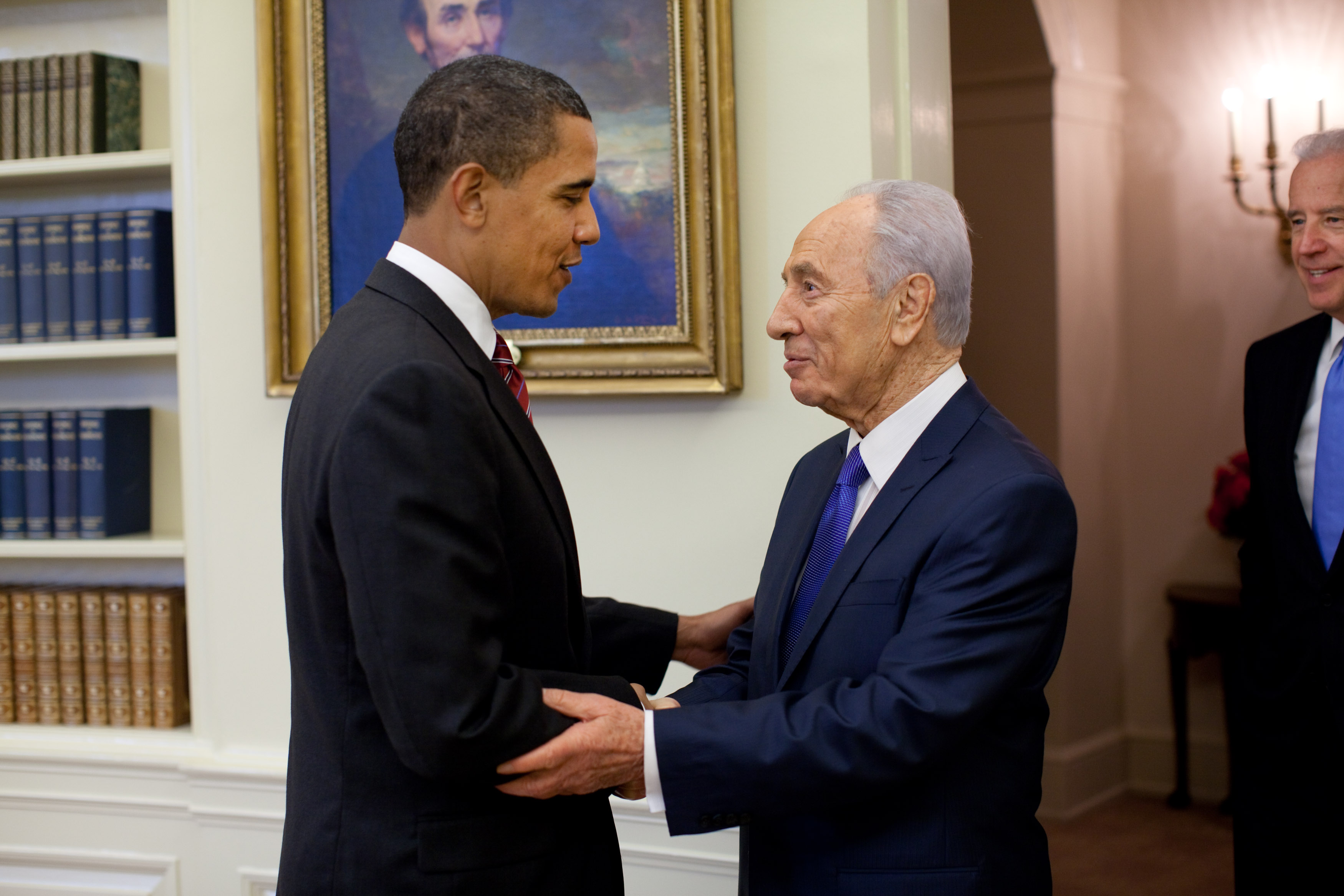
Obama and President Peres.

- May 5 – President Obama meets with Israeli president Shimon Peres in the Oval Office of the White House to discuss the foreign affairs of Israel, the relationship between Palestinians and Israelis, and the prospects of a two-state solution.
- May 6 – President Obama holds a summit with Afghan president Hamid Karzai and Pakistani president Asif Ali Zardari at the White House.
- May 9 – President Obama speaks at the White House Correspondents' Dinner, along with special guest comedian Wanda Sykes.
- May 13 – At Arizona State University, President Obama gives his first commencement address as president, but does not receive an honorary degree from the university.
- May 15 – The World Series Champion Philadelphia Phillies are honored at the White House by President Obama.
- May 16 – Jon Huntsman Jr., the Republican Governor of Utah, is named United States Ambassador to China by President Obama, to replace Clark T. Randt Jr. of Connecticut.

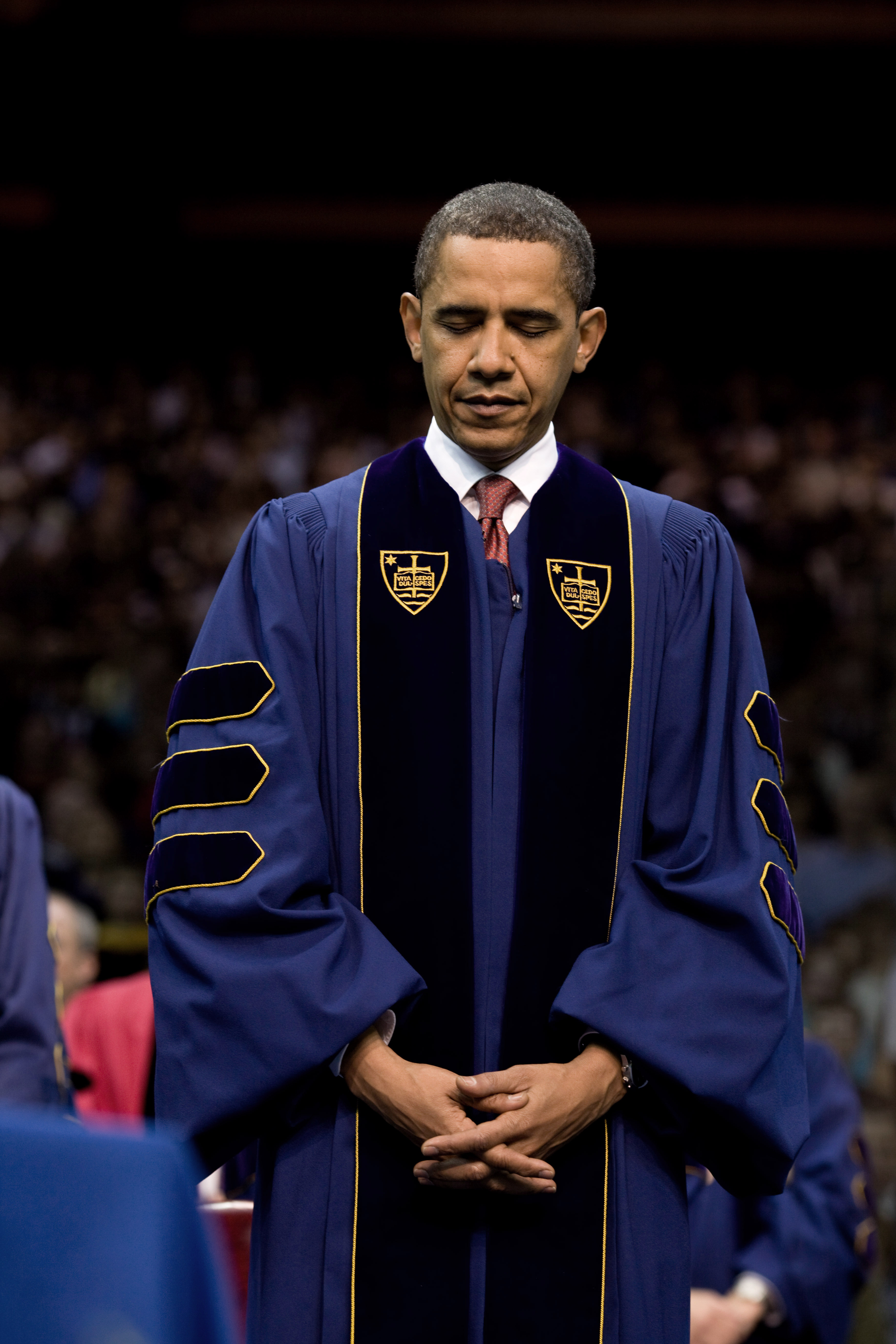
Obama at University of Notre Dame.

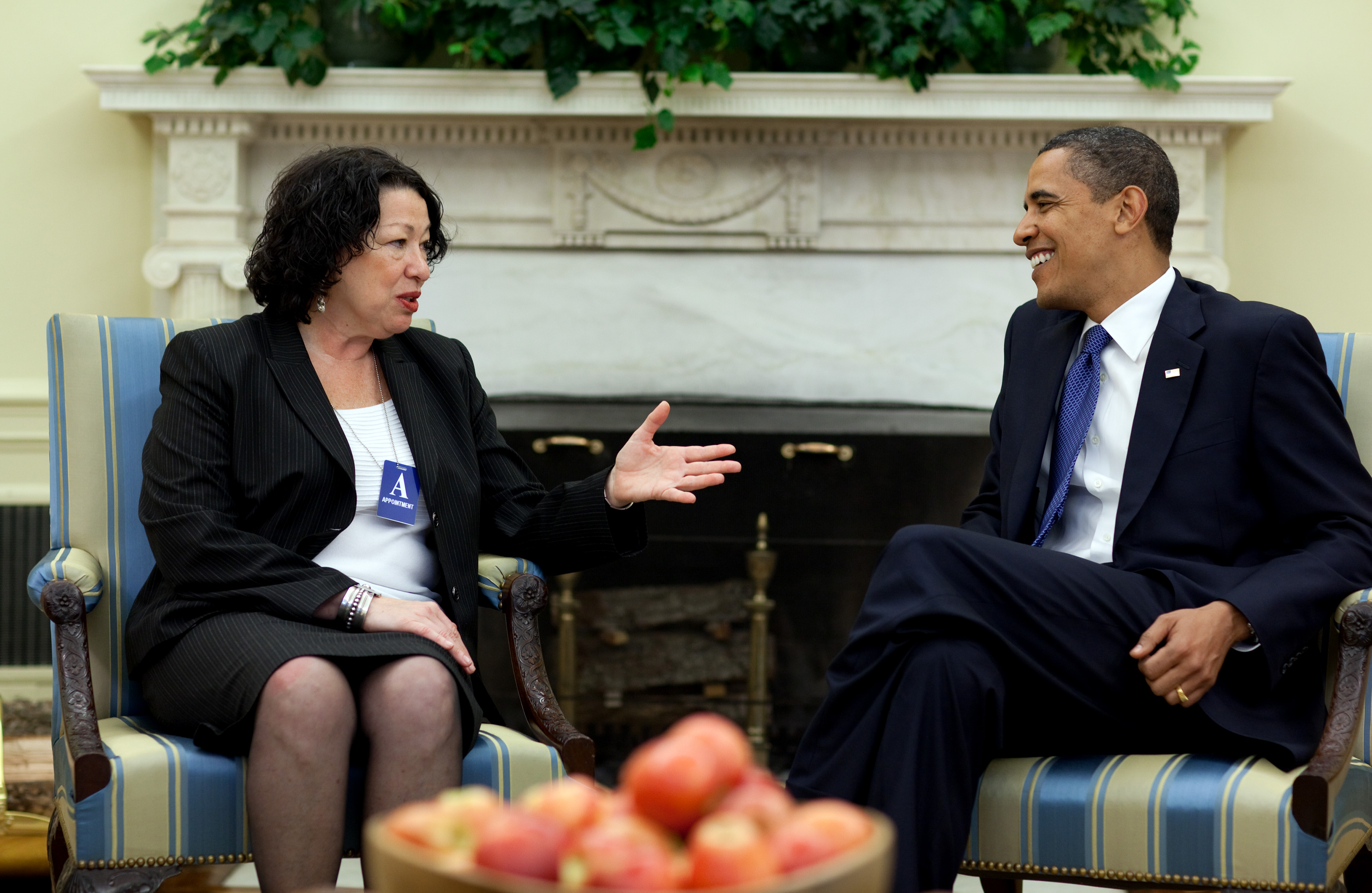
Obama meeting with Sotomayor.

- May 17 – Amidst controversy over his visit, in regards to his stance on issues such as abortion and his recent executive order that lifts the ban on stem cell research, President Obama delivers the commencement address at the University of Notre Dame.
- May 18 – Israeli prime minister Benjamin Netanyahu meets with President Obama and Secretary of State Hillary Clinton in Washington.
- May 19 – President Obama announces plans to create new automobile fuel efficiency standards requiring cars, as well as light trucks to have an average of at least 35.5 miles per gallon, by 2016, in an attempt to curve emissions and reduce the United States' contributions to global warming.
- May 20 – The Helping Families Save Their Homes Act of 2009 and the Fraud Enforcement and Recovery Act are signed into law by President Obama to help alleviate burdens caused by the Great Recession in the United States.
- May 22 – President Obama gives the commencement address at United States Naval Academy. The president also signs the Weapon Systems Acquisition Reform Act and the Credit CARD Act into law, to reform legislation and aim "... to establish fair and transparent practices relating to the extension of credit under an open end consumer credit plan, and for other purposes."
- May 23 – Major General Charles Bolden is nominated by President Obama to be the next NASA administrator, marking the first African American to be nominated to the position. Lori Garver is nominated to be the deputy administrator.
- May 25 – President Obama continues the long-standing tradition of the U.S. president sending a wreath to the Confederate Memorial at Arlington National Cemetery on Memorial Day and garners praise from Sons of Confederate Veterans Commander Chuck McMichael.
- May 26 – President Obama nominates federal judge Sonia Sotomayor to replace retiring Supreme Court justice David Souter. Confirmed in August, she becomes the just the third woman, and first Hispanic, to be appointed to the court.
- May 30 – Plans for a CyberSpace Czar to help prevent web crimes such as identity theft and other breaches of computer security networks are announced by the president. The president and first lady later travel to New York City, where they dined at Blue Hill and attend the Broadway revival of Joe Turner's Come and Gone.
- May 31 – President Obama denounces and condemns the killing of medical director and abortion provider George Tiller, saying he was "shocked and outraged" by the assassination and death of Tiller.

== June ==
- June 1 – President Obama speaks to the American public about the General Motors bankruptcy crisis in a press conference at the White House.
- June 2 – The president nominates Congressman John M. McHugh for the position of United States Secretary of the Army. Former First Lady Nancy Reagan visits the White House, and President Obama holds a press conference to announce legislation honoring the achievements of former president Ronald Reagan.
- June 3 – President Obama visits with King Abdullah in Saudi Arabia on his way to Cairo, Egypt to make a speech introducing himself to the Muslim world.

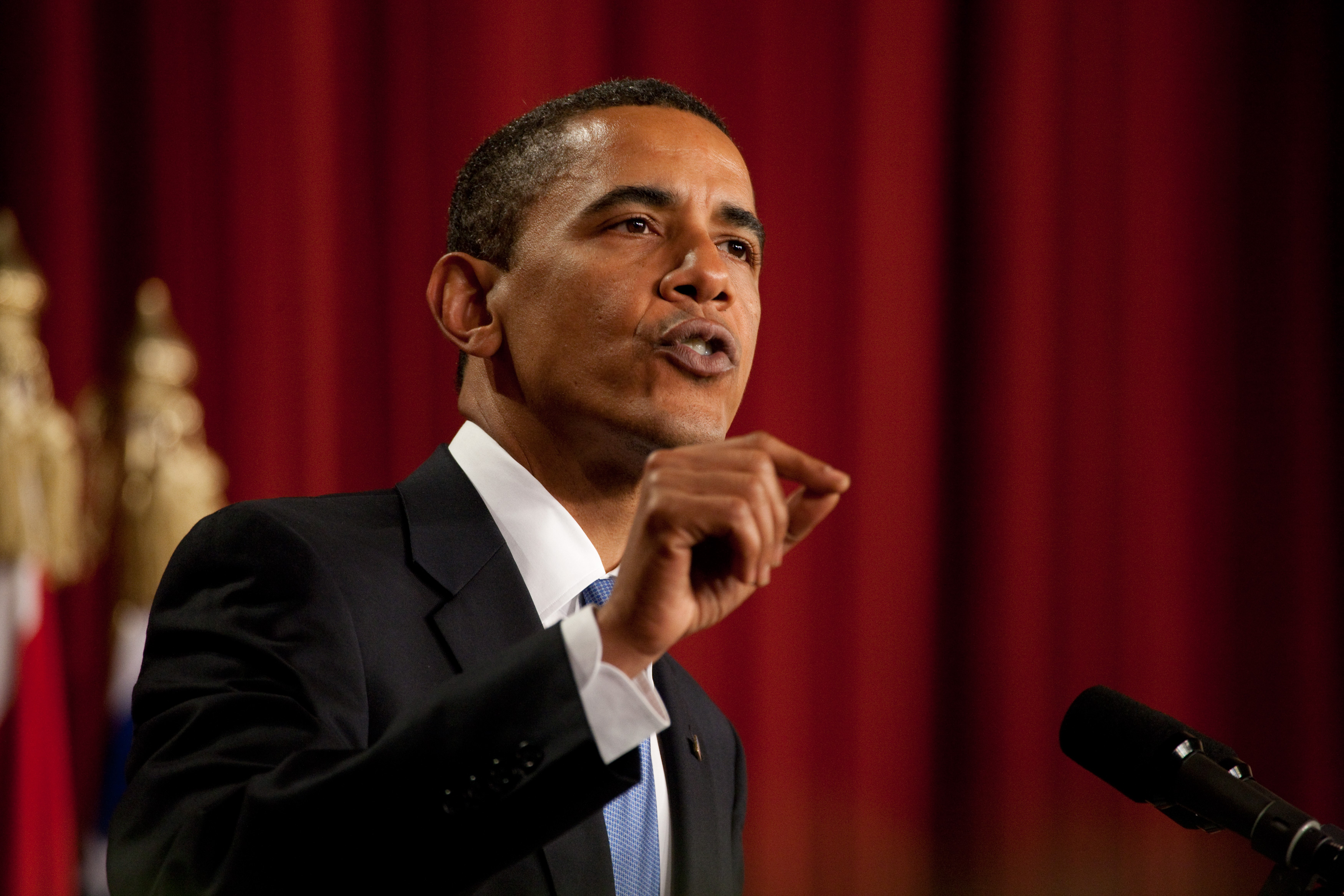
Obama speaking in Cairo, Egypt.

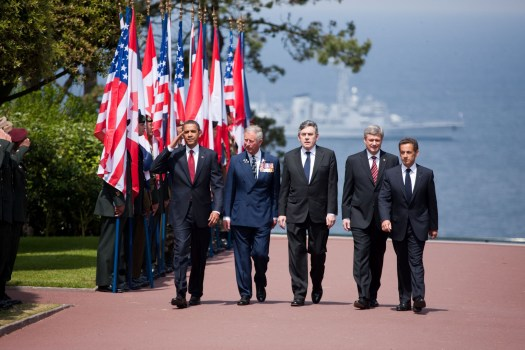
Obama with Prince Charles, PM Brown, PM Harper, and President Sarkozy.

- June 4 – President Obama gives a speech in Cairo, Egypt, as a part of a worldwide attempt to repair the image of America around the world, a promise he made during his campaign for President of the United States. During the speech, President Obama notably references the Bible, the Torah, the Qur'an, and other Muslim texts in his address to the more than one thousand Cairo University students in attendance. The president also announced that the U.S. Government would host a Summit on Entrepreneurship to identify how we can deepen ties between business leaders, foundations, and entrepreneurs in the United States and Muslim communities around the world.
- June 5 – President Obama visits Buchenwald, a former Nazi concentration camp used during World War II, with German Chancellor Angela Merkel and survivor and activist Elie Wiesel, during his trip through Germany. President Obama then arrives in Paris, visits the Eiffel Tower with his family, and meets French president Sarkozy.
- June 6 – President Obama commemorates the 65th anniversary of D-Day in Normandy, France, along with Prime Minister Stephen Harper of Canada and Prime Minister Gordon Brown of the United Kingdom, Prince Charles and President Nicolas Sarkozy of France.
- June 11 – President Obama holds a town hall meeting in Green Bay, Wisconsin to discuss the issue of healthcare.
- June 12- Prime Minister Morgan Tsvangirai of Zimbabwe visits President Obama at the White House, inside the Oval Office.
- June 15 – Italian prime minister Silvio Berlusconi visits President Obama at the White House. President Obama addresses the annual meeting of the American Medical Association in Chicago to discuss the rising cost of health care.
- June 17 – President Obama announces sweeping proposals to rework financial regulation and move the country toward financial stability. President Obama also signs a memorandum extending certain benefits to federal employees involved in same sex partnerships.
- June 19 – Along with other prominent fathers, Obama holds a town hall meeting at the White House to commemorate Father's Day, and bring awareness to the relationship of American fathers and children. President Obama notably identified his father as one of the greatest influences in his own life, in the short time that they were together.
- June 22 – President Obama signs legislation granting authority over tobacco products to the United States Food and Drug Administration in the Rose Garden of the White House. President Obama also announced an $80 billion, 10 year offer by drug manufacturers to close the gap between Medicare prescription drug coverage and comprehensive health care reform.
- June 23 – President Obama holds a press conference to discuss the issues of healthcare, as well as the recent Iranian election protests in Iran.
- June 26 – The president signs the "Cash-for-Clunkers bill" into law to increase national fuel efficiency, as well as stimulate the automobile industry, after both Chrysler and General Motors had filed for Chapter 11 bankruptcy.
- June 27 – The removal of American combat troops from major Iraqi cities begins.
- June 28 – President Obama meets with President Álvaro Uribe of Colombia in the Oval Office. The president and First Lady also host a reception in the East Room for LGBT Pride Month.
- June 30 – The president delivers remarks at an event in the East Room to highlight programs that have been able to make a difference in communities across the country.

== July ==
- July 1 – President Obama holds an online townhall meeting to discuss health care reform. President Obama is joined by Senior Advisor Valerie Jarrett.
- July 2 – The president meets in the Roosevelt Room with leaders of companies that are creating jobs. The president also delivers remarks about innovation and jobs in the White House Rose Garden.

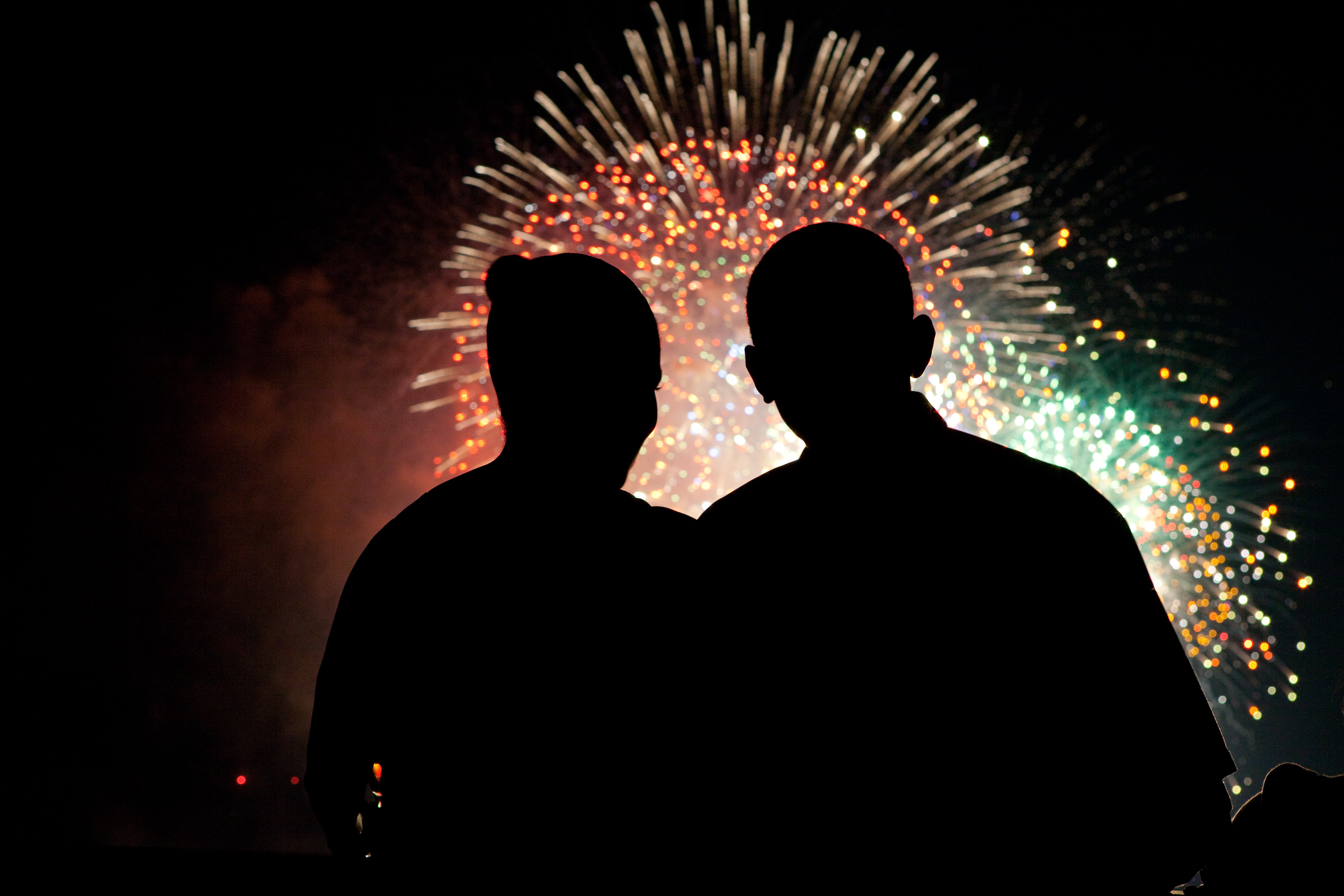
President and First Lady Obama watch fireworks on Independence Day.

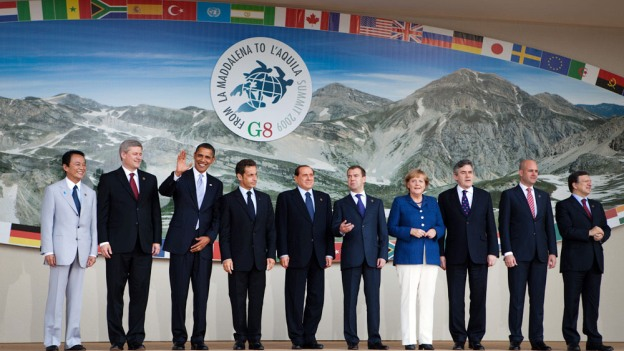
G-8 leaders in L'Aquila, Italy.

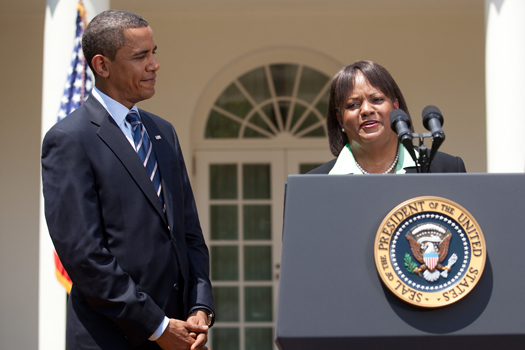
Obama with Dr. Regina Benjamin.

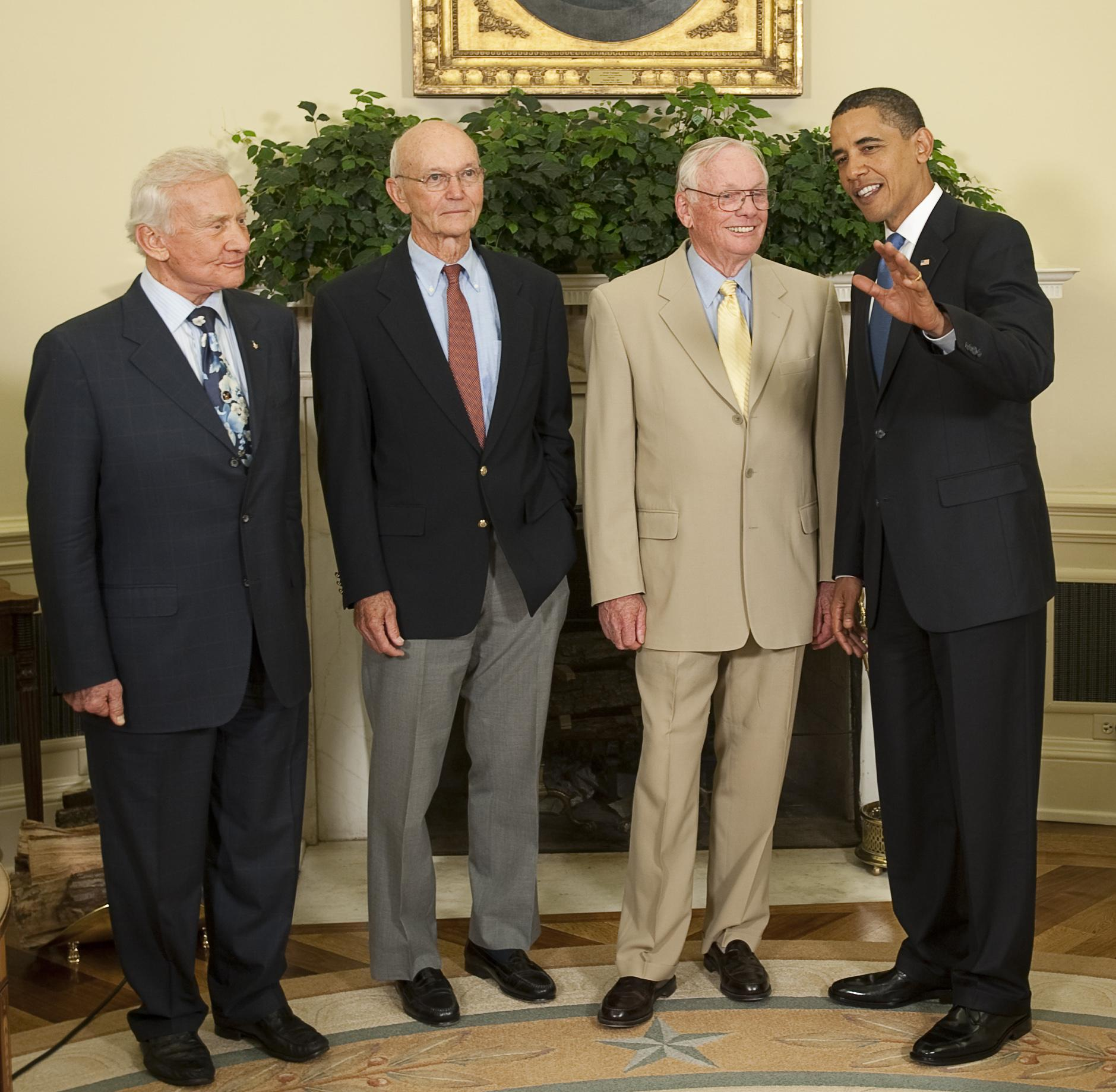
Obama with Apollo 11 crew.

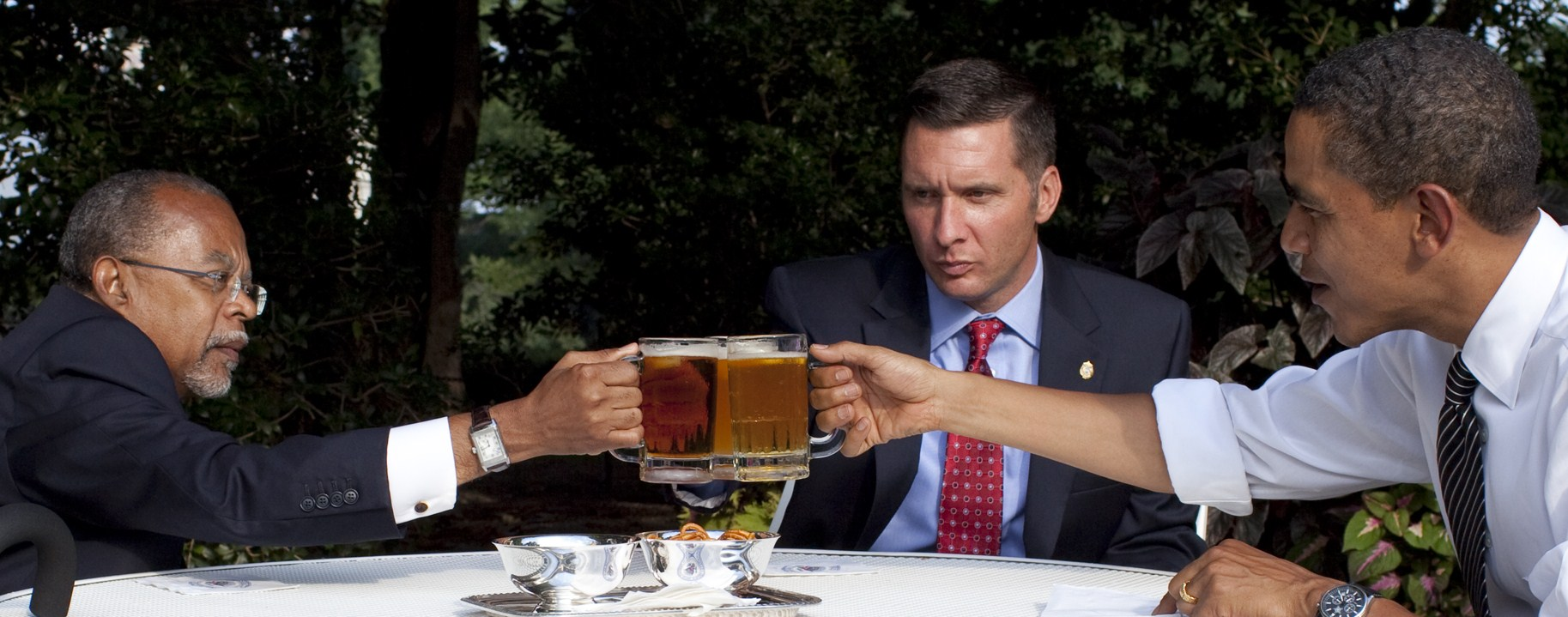
Obama, Henry Louis Gates, and James Crowley at the "beer summit" on July 30.

- July 4 – The White House celebrates Independence Day and honors military heroes and their families with a barbecue on the South Lawn. The celebrations conclude with fireworks on the White House grounds and at the Washington Memorial.
- July 6 – The president and First Lady arrive in Moscow to meet with Russian president Dmitry Medvedev, to discuss diplomatic progress in regards to nuclear weapons, as well as the situation in Afghanistan. President Obama also speaks at the graduation ceremony of the New Economic School in Moscow.
- July 7 – President Obama meets with Russian prime minister Vladimir Putin, in a continuous attempt to restructure the U.S.–Russian relationship. President Obama also meets with former Soviet President Mikhail Gorbachev in Gostinny Dvor, Russia.
- July 8 – President Obama meets with Italian president Giorgio Napolitano at the Quirinal Palace in Rome. The president then attends the first day of the G8 Summit in L'Aquila, Italy, and tours the quake zone that was struck in April, 2009.
- July 9 – President Obama attends the second day of the G-8 Summit, and holds a bilateral meeting with Brazilian president Lula da Silva. The president also attends a working dinner hosted by Italian president Giorgio Napolitano later that day.
- July 10 – On the final day of the G-8 Summit, President Obama meets with South African president Jacob Zuma, President Obama also visits Pope Benedict XVI in Vatican City. The president then heads to Ghana in Africa, his first visit to any sub-saharan African nation since he was elected president.
- July 11 – President Obama gives a speech about Africa's hardships in regards to disease, as well as prospects for Africa's future, to the Ghanaian Parliament in Accra, Ghana. The president also speaks at a "departure ceremony" at Accra International Airport in Accra, along with the Ghanaian president John Atta Mills.
- July 13 – The president nominates Dr. Regina Benjamin for the position of United States Surgeon General, noting her experience as a medical doctor in Alabama, and her multiple rebuildings of her office after natural disasters, in selecting her for the office.
- July 14 – President Obama meets with Dutch prime minister Jan Peter Balkenende in the Oval Office. President Obama then speaks at Macomb Community College, and proposes a $12 billion effort to help two-year institutions to "train more people [...] for the jobs of the future." President Obama also throws the first pitch at baseball's annual All-Star Game at Busch Stadium.
- July 15 – A milestone is achieved when a Senate committee approves a plan to revamp the U.S. health care system. The Senate confirmed President Obama's nominations of retired astronaut Maj. Gen. Charles Bolden as administrator of NASA and Lori Garver as the assistant administrator.
- July 16 – President Obama gives a speech in New York City at the NAACP's 100th anniversary celebration. The president also speaks at a Holmdel Township, New Jersey political rally in support of Governor Jon Corzine's re-election campaign.
- July 17 – President Obama gives a speech on healthcare reform, to help to pass a national healthcare bill in the Congress, and address concerns over a government run healthcare program.
- July 20 – The president meets with the Apollo 11 crew, Neil Armstrong, Michael Collins and Buzz Aldrin, in the Oval Office on the 40th Anniversary of the lunar landing.
- July 21 – The president and First Lady host an event celebrating country music, with performers Charley Pride, Brad Paisley and Alison Krauss and Union Station.
- July 22 – The president holds a primetime news conference to address concerns over the healthcare bill in Congress. President Obama also comments on the arrest of Henry Louis Gates, and the actions of the police in arresting Gates. President Obama also meets with Iraqi prime minister Nouri al-Maliki in the Oval Office, and hold a joint news conference in the White House Rose Garden.
- July 23 – President Obama travels to Cleveland, Ohio to tour the Cleveland Clinic, as well as deliver further remarks about healthcare reform.
- July 27 – President Obama and Chinese leaders Wang Qishan, Chinese Vice Premier, and Chinese State Councilor Dai Bingguo, attend the U.S.–China Strategic and Economic Dialogue held in Washington, D.C.
- July 29 – President Obama holds a townhall meeting in Raleigh, North Carolina.
- July 30 – President Obama and Vice President Biden hold a "beer summit" at the White House with Harvard scholar Henry Louis Gates and the arresting officer Sgt. James Crowley of the Cambridge Police Department, in order to address the issue of race in America and discuss the arrest of Gates in his Massachusetts home on July 16, 2009. Obama also discusses remarks he had made during his news conference on July 22, in which he stated that the police department had "acted stupidly" in arresting Gates.
- July 30 – President Obama meets with President Gloria Macapagal Arroyo of the Philippines in the Oval Office. The 2 leaders talk about the strong relationship between the Philippines and United States. They also discuss terrorism in the Southern Philippines and environmental issues. President Arroyo is the first Asian Leader to attend discussions at the White House during Obama's Presidency.

== August ==
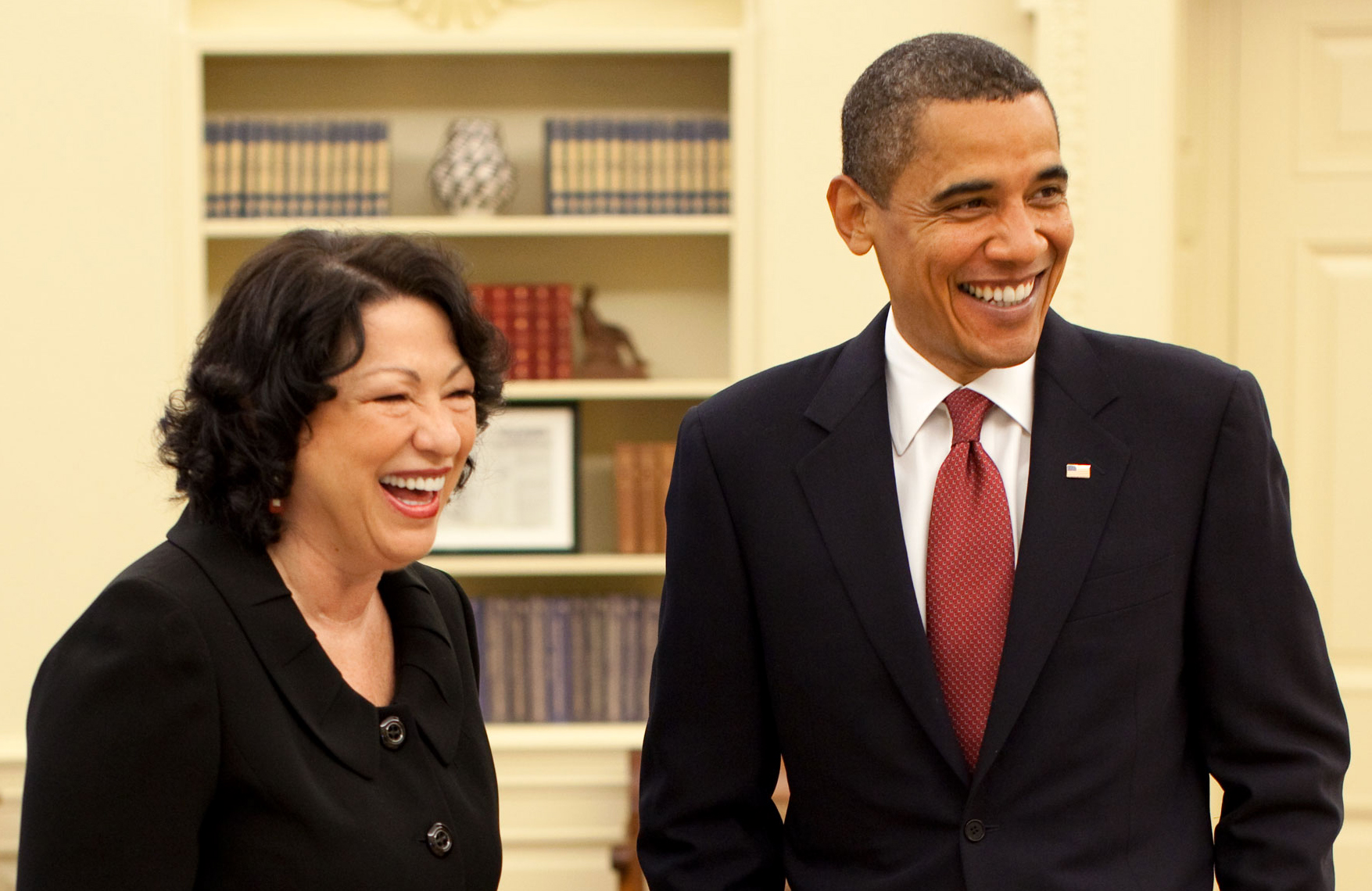
Obama with Sotomayor in the Oval Office.

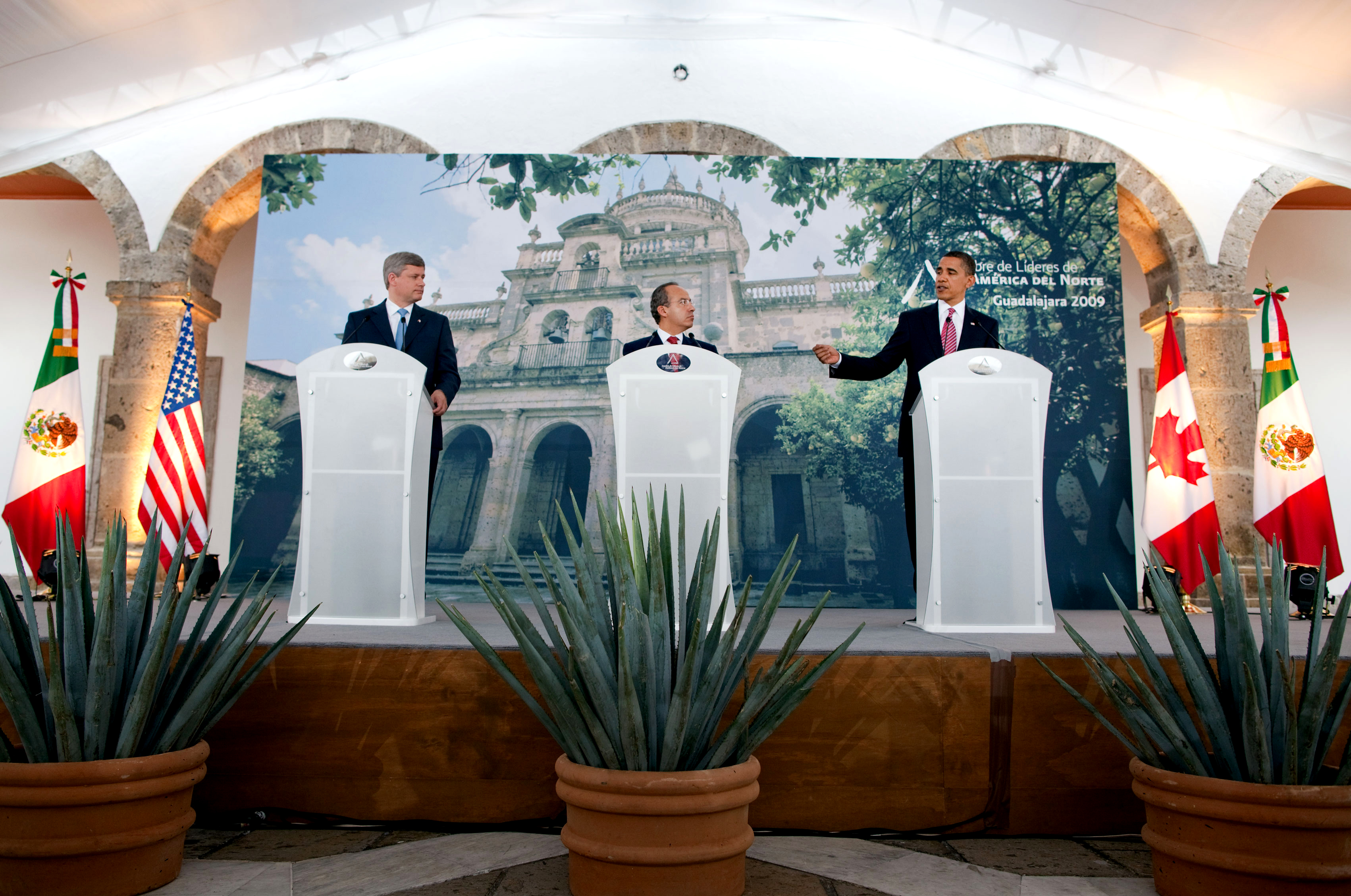
Obama with Harper and Calderón during a joint press conference.

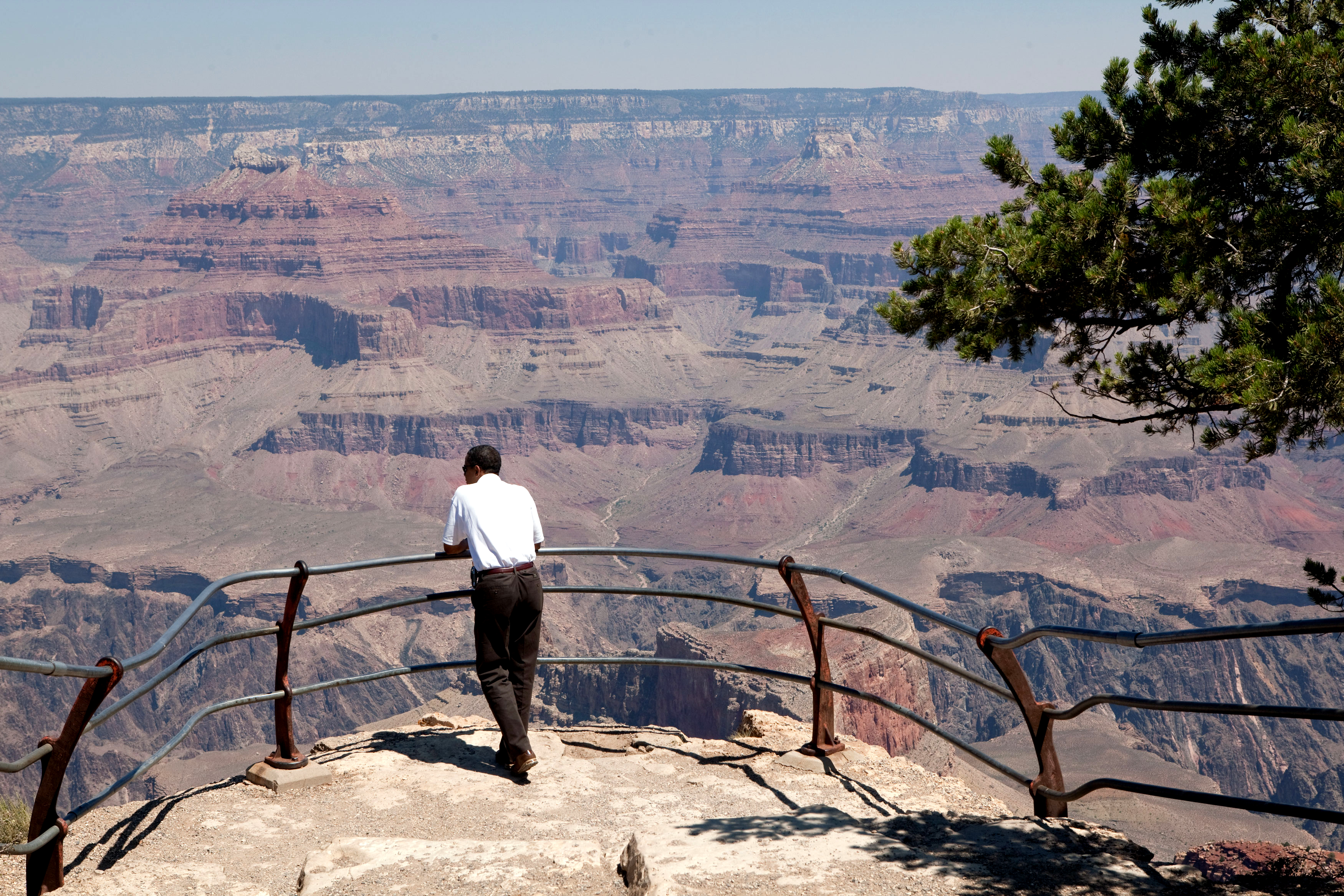
Obama at the Grand Canyon.

- August 3 – The president meets with Sheikh Sabah Al-Ahmad Al-Jaber Al-Sabah, the Emir of Kuwait, in the Oval Office.
- August 4 – President Obama celebrates his forty-eighth birthday at the White House. President Obama also meets with National Commander of the American Legion Dave Rehbein and executive director Peter Gaytan.
- August 5 – President Obama visits Elkhart, Indiana for the second time in his presidency to hold a townhall meeting about unemployment in the work force and new jobs being created.
- August 6 – President Obama delivers brief remarks about the confirmation of soon-to-be Supreme Court Justice Sonia Sotomayor, and expresses gratitude to the Senators who confirmed her.
- August 7 – The president gives a statement in the Rose Garden in regards to the release of the Bureau of Labor Statistics' unemployment figures for the month of July.
- August 8 – President Obama travels to Mexico for the two-day North American Leaders' Summit with the leaders of Mexico and Canada.
- August 10 – President Obama meets in Guadalajara, Mexico with President Felipe Calderón of Mexico and Prime Minister Stephen Harper of Canada for a trilateral meeting to discuss the Great Recession, climate change, security and safety, as well as the 2009 swine flu pandemic.
- August 11 – President Obama holds a townhall meeting in Portsmouth, New Hampshire to answer concerns about healthcare reform.
- August 12 – The president holds a welcoming ceremony for newly appointed Supreme Court Justice Sonia Sotomayor in the East Room of the White House. President Obama also awards the Presidential Medal of Freedom to 16 recipients, including Nancy Brinker, Pedro José Greer, Stephen Hawking, Ted Kennedy, Billie Jean King, Joseph Lowery, Joseph Medicine Crow, Sandra Day O'Connor, Sidney Poitier, Chita Rivera, Mary Robinson, Janet Rowley, Desmond Tutu, and Muhammad Yunus. Jack Kemp and Harvey Milk were also posthumously awarded the Medal of Freedom.
- August 14 – President Obama holds a townhall meeting, in Belgrade, Montana, to discuss health insurance reform, and the healthcare bill in Congress.
- August 15 – President Obama holds another townhall meeting, in Grand Junction, Colorado, to continue his emphasis on healthcare reform.
- August 16 – President Obama visits the Grand Canyon in Arizona with First Lady Michelle Obama, and daughters Malia and Sasha Obama.
- August 17 – President Obama gives a speech to the Veterans of Foreign Wars convention in Phoenix, Arizona.
- August 18 – President Obama, along with Vice President Biden and Secretary of State Clinton, meet with Egyptian president Hosni Mubarak in the Oval Office.
- August 19 – President Obama hosts NASCAR drivers Jimmie Johnson, Tony Stewart, Jeff Gordon, Richard Petty, Dale Earnhardt Jr., Carl Edwards and others in an event honoring Johnson as the winner of the 2008 Sprint Cup Championship.
- August 29 – President Obama gives the eulogy at the funeral service of Senator Edward Moore Kennedy. Former Presidents Jimmy Carter, Bill Clinton and George W. Bush (also representing his father, former president George H. W. Bush) attend, along with Vice President Biden, three former vice presidents, 58 senators, 21 former senators, many members of the House of Representatives, and several foreign dignitaries.

== September ==
- September 8 – After a week of vacation at the White House, President Obama speaks at Wakefield High School in Arlington, Virginia to promote education.

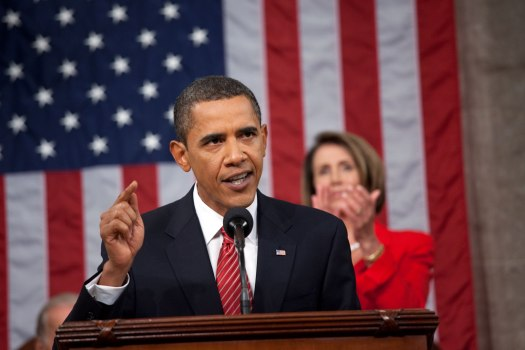
Obama speech to joint session of Congress, September 2009

- September 9 – President Obama attends memorial services for journalist Walter Cronkite held at New York City's Lincoln Center. Later, the president outlines his healthcare proposal in a speech to a joint session of Congress, amidst controversy in regards to a public option, illegal immigrant's access to healthcare and "death panels".
- September 10 – President Obama meets with Prince General Mohammed bin Zayed Al Nahyan of Abu Dhabi in the Oval Office.
- September 11 – President Obama addresses family members and friends who lost loved ones on September 11, 2001, in the September 11 attacks, at the Pentagon. President Obama and the First Lady also meet with the Crown Prince Willem-Alexander and Princess Máxima of the Netherlands in the Yellow Oval Room of the White House.
- September 12 – President Obama holds a rally in Minneapolis, Minnesota at the Target Center to continue speaking about his healthcare reform.
- September 14 – President Obama speaks about the 2008 financial crisis at Federal Hall National Memorial on Wall Street in New York City.
- September 15 – President Obama visits the General Motors Lordstown Assembly Plant in Lordstown, Ohio. President Obama also addresses the AFL–CIO at the David L. Lawrence Convention Center in Pittsburgh, Pennsylvania.
- September 16 – President Obama delivers remarks during a U.S. Olympians youth sporting event on the South Lawn of the White House, to promote Chicago's bid for the 2016 Summer Olympics.
- September 17 – President Obama posthumously awards Sergeant First Class Jared C. Monti the Medal of Honor in the East Room, at the White House. President Obama then speaks at the University of Maryland to deliver remarks and hold a healthcare rally. President Obama also hosts a screening of The National Parks: America's Best Idea along with Ken Burns, Dayton Duncan and Secretary of Interior Ken Salazar.

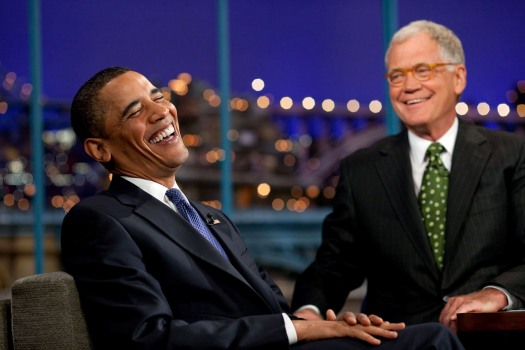
Obama with Late Show host David Letterman.

- September 21 – President Obama visits Hudson Valley Community College in Troy, New York. The president also appears on the Late Show with David Letterman, for his second late night talk show interview since becoming president.
- September 22 – President Obama addresses the Climate Change Summit at the United Nations General Assembly in New York.
- September 23 – President Obama gives his first speech to the United Nations General Assembly. President Obama also speaks as a guest speaker at the Clinton Global Initiative in New York City.
- September 24 – President Obama attends and hosts the G-20 summit meeting held in Pittsburgh, Pennsylvania. Additionally, in a first for an American president, President Obama chairs a U.N. Security Council summit dedicated to nuclear disarmament and proliferation.
- September 25 – While at the G20 summit, President Obama along with French president Nicolas Sarkozy and British prime minister Gordon Brown make a public statement accusing Iran of constructing a secret nuclear facility near Qom.
- September 29 – President Obama meets with NATO Secretary General Anders Fogh Rasmussen in the Oval Office for an expanded delegation meeting.
- September 30 – President Obama tours the National Institute of Health in Bethesda, Maryland, along with NIH Director Francis Collins and Secretary of Health and Human Services Kathleen Sebelius.

== October ==
- October 1 – President Obama gives a statement on the Iranian nuclear program, in the Diplomatic Reception Room of the White House.

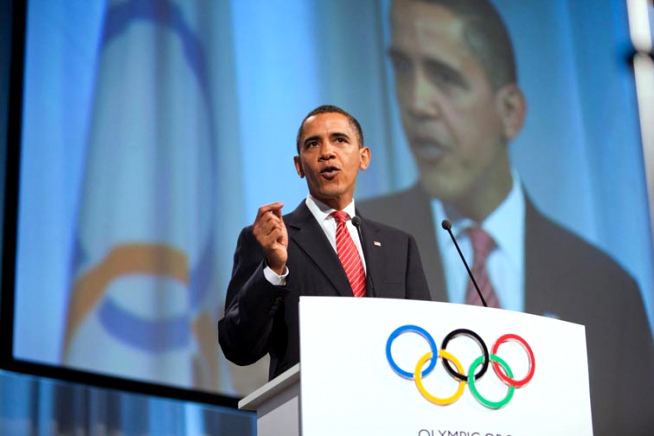
Obama speaking in Copenhagen.

- October 2 – President and First Lady, along with Oprah Winfrey, travel to Copenhagen, Denmark, to give a speech to the International Olympic Committee in a failed attempt to bring the 2016 Summer Olympics to Chicago.
- October 3 – The president and First Lady celebrate their 17th wedding anniversary at the Blue Duck Tavern in Washington, D.C. before heading back to the White House.
- October 5 – President Obama gives a speech to doctors about health care reform on the Rose Garden of the White House. Obama also participates in a CEQ Executive Order signing in the Oval Office.
- October 6 – President Obama meets with the National Counter Terrorism Center leadership and analysts during a visit to the NCTC in McLean, Virginia.
- October 7 – The president presents 2008 Medals of Science and Medals of Technology and Innovation during a ceremony in the East Room of the White House. President Obama also hosts an Astronomy Night on the South Lawn, with Sally Ride.
- October 9 – The 2009 Nobel Peace Prize is awarded to President Obama "for his extraordinary efforts to strengthen international diplomacy and cooperation between peoples".

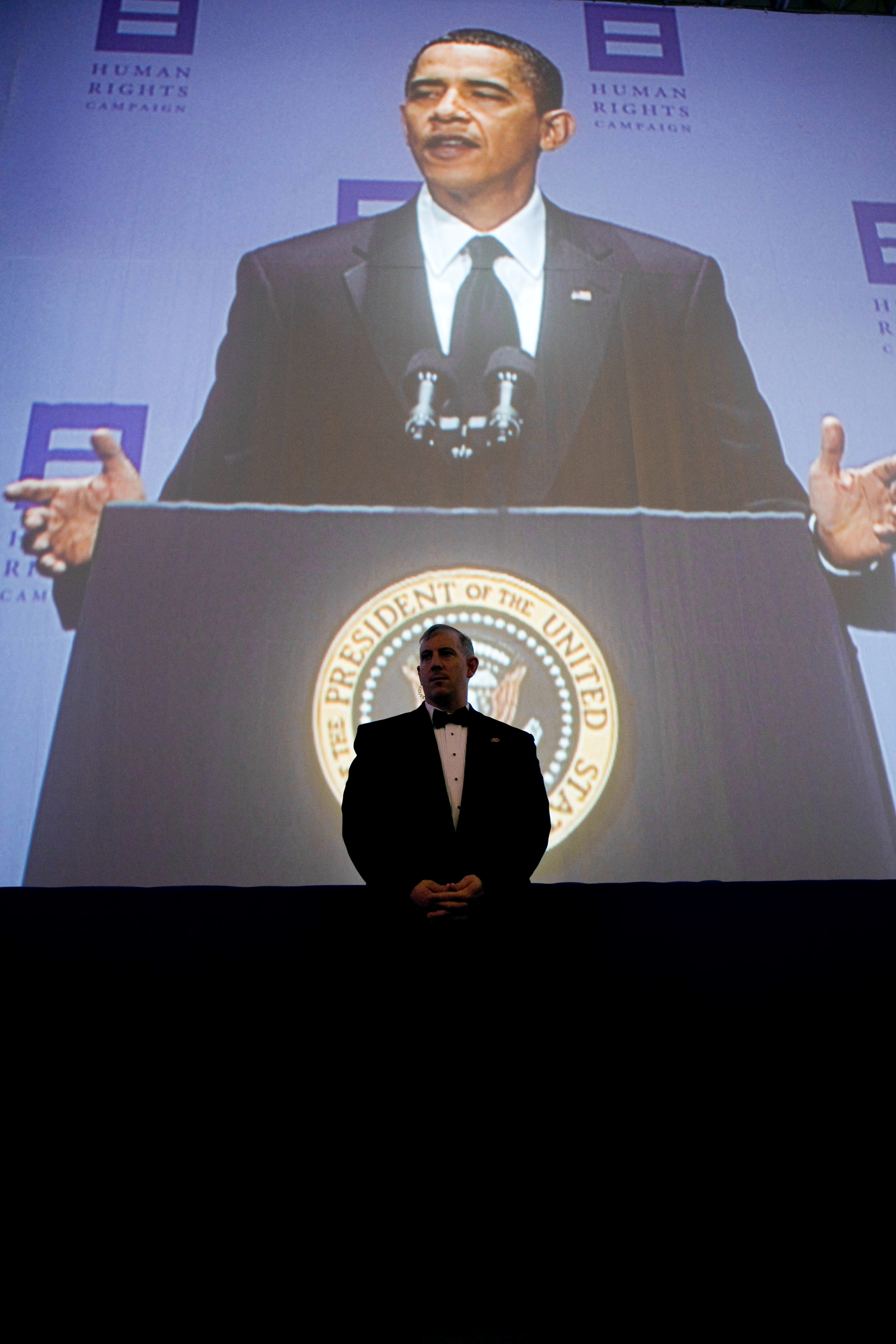
Obama speaking to the Human Rights Campaign.

- October 10 – President Obama speaks at the Human Rights Campaign's 13th annual national dinner, to address civil rights and equality, along with gay marriage and "Don't ask, don't tell."
- October 13 – President Obama gives a statement thanking United States Senator Olympia Snowe, and thirteen Democratic Senators on the Senate Finance Committee for approving a healthcare bill. President Obama then meets with Prime Minister José Luis Rodríguez Zapatero of Spain. President Obama also hosts a "Fiesta Latina" event at the White House, and welcomes performers Marc Anthony, Gloria Estefan, Tito el Bambino, Jimmy Smits, Eva Longoria and George Lopez.
- October 14 – President Obama nominates Sharon Lubinski of the Minneapolis Police Department to be the first openly homosexual person to serve as a Marshal in the United States Marshals Service. President Obama also speaks at the Ritz-Carlton Hotel in Washington, D.C., about Ted Kennedy and the Edward M. Kennedy Institute for the United States Senate.
- October 15 – President Obama travels to New Orleans, Louisiana, to visit areas still recovering from Hurricane Katrina. President Obama then travels to San Francisco, California to speak to the Democratic National Committee, alongside House Speaker Nancy Pelosi.
- October 16 – President Obama speaks to a forum at Texas A&M University, alongside former president George H. W. Bush, in College Station, Texas, to promote public service.
- October 19 – President Obama visits Viers Mill Elementary School in Silver Spring, Maryland to speak to children about reading.
- October 20 – President Obama meets with Iraqi prime minister Nouri al-Maliki in the Oval Office. President Obama later travel to the headquarters of the Joint Terrorism Task Force in New York City.
- October 21 – President Obama, along with Treasury Secretary Timothy Geithner, speaks at the Metropolitan Archives, in Landover, Maryland to announce a package of initiatives to increase credit to small businesses. President Obama also meets with Senator John Kerry in the Oval Office to discuss the war in Afghanistan.
- October 22 – President Obama signs the Veterans Health Care Budget Reform and Transparency Act in the East Room of the White House.
- October 23 – President Obama declares a national emergency, in response to the H1N1 epidemic, in the United States.

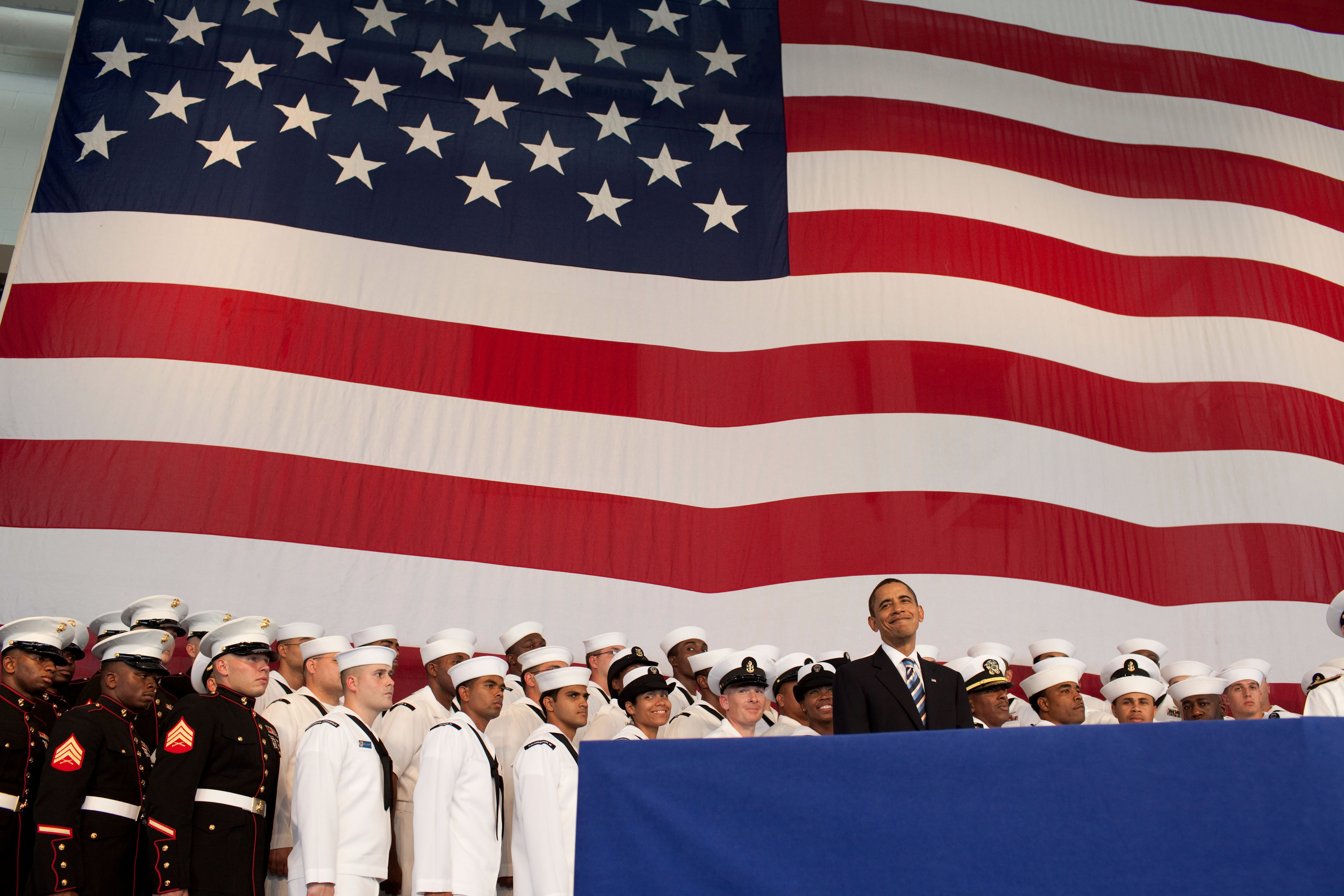
Obama speaking to servicemen and women at Naval Air Station Jacksonville.

- October 26 – President Obama gives a speech to servicemen and women at Naval Air Station Jacksonville, in Jacksonville, Florida.
- October 27 – President Obama speaks and tours the DeSoto Next Generation Solar Energy Center in Arcadia, Florida.
- October 28 – President Obama signs the Matthew Shepard Act in the East Room of the White House, expanding hate-crime law to include gender, sexual orientation, gender identity or disability.
- October 29 – President Obama travels to Dover Air Force Base to oversee the return of eighteen American soldiers killed in Afghanistan.
- October 30 – President Obama signs an executive order, lifting a 22-year-old immigration and travel ban on citizens of the United States with HIV.
- October 31 – The First Family hosts a Halloween party at the White House, and welcome more than two thousand children.

== November ==
- November 1 – President Obama travels to Camden and Newark, New Jersey to support the reelection campaign of Governor Jon Corzine.
- November 2 – President Obama meets with Prime Minister Fredrik Reinfeldt of Sweden to discuss climate change before the United Nations Climate Change Conference 2009.
- November 3 – President Obama hosts several European leaders, meeting with German Chancellor Angela Merkel, Patriarch Bartholomew I, President of the European Commission Jose Manuel Barroso and the High Representative for the Common Foreign and Security Policy Javier Solana.
- November 4 – President Obama and Secretary of Education Arne Duncan travel to James C. Wright Middle School in Madison, Wisconsin to discuss overhauls to the American education system.
- November 5 – President Obama meets with the Botswanan President Ian Khama in the Oval Office. President Obama also meets with the Congressional Hispanic Caucus to discuss Hispanic relations in the United States.
- November 6 – President Obama visits Walter Reed Army Medical Center in Washington, D.C., to award two Purple Hearts.
- November 9 – President Obama welcomes Israeli prime minister Benjamin Netanyahu in the Oval Office. President Obama also signs an executive order establishing the Council on Veterans Employment.
- November 10 – President Obama gives a eulogy at the Fort Hood ceremony honoring those killed in the shooting rampage on November 5, 2009, by Major Nidal Malik Hasan.
- November 11 – President Obama travels to Arlington National Cemetery on Veterans Day, to lay a ceremonial wreath on the Tomb of the Unknowns.
- November 12 – President Obama meets with military personnel at the Elmendorf Air Force Base, near Anchorage, Alaska.

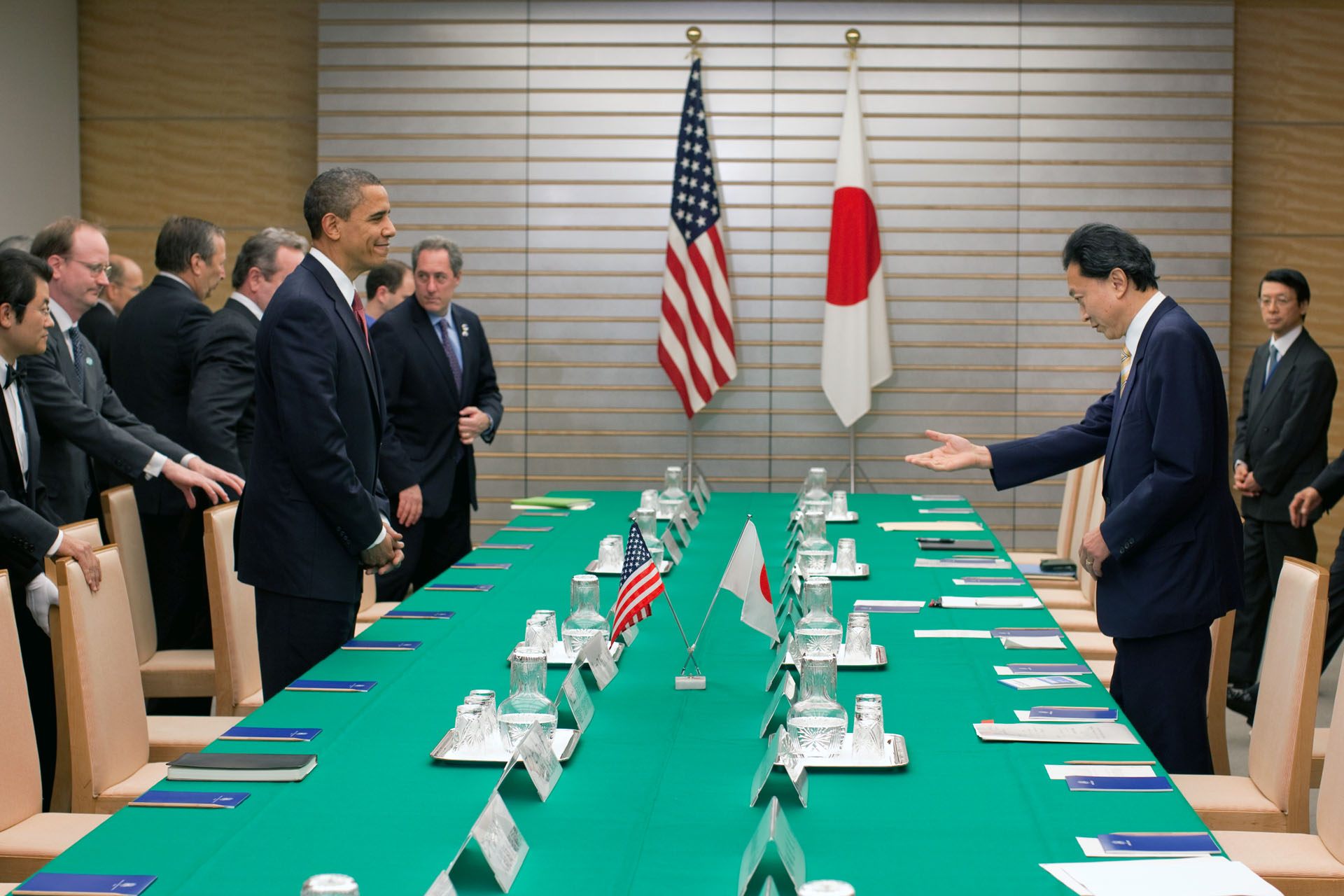
Obama meeting with Yukio Hatoyama.

- November 13 – President Obama arrives in Tokyo to meet with Japanese prime minister Yukio Hatoyama, and holds a bilateral meeting.
- November 14 – President Obama delivers a major address regarding Asia's relationship with the United States, at Suntory Hall in Minato, Tokyo, Japan.
- November 15 – President Obama attends the APEC economic summit in the Republic of Singapore, along with United States Trade Representative Ron Kirk. President Obama also meets with Russian president Dmitry Medvedev and Singaporean prime minister Lee Hsien Loong.
- November 16 – President Obama meets mayor Han Zheng in Shanghai, and holds a town hall to meet with students at the Shanghai Science and Technology Museum. President Obama also attends a state dinner with President Hu Jintao in Beijing.
- November 17 – President Obama holds a series of meetings with President Hu Jintao, to discuss issues regarding U.S.-China relations. President Obama also tours the Forbidden City in Beijing.
- November 18 – President Obama meets with Premier Wen Jiabao and visits the Great Wall of China before leaving for Seoul, South Korea.
- November 19 – President Obama meets and holds an arrival ceremony with South Korean president Lee Myung-bak in Seoul, South Korea.
- November 23 – President Obama presents the Robert F. Kennedy Human Rights Award to Magadonga Mahlangu, Jenni Williams, and their organization known as WOZA, in a ceremony in the East Room of the White House.

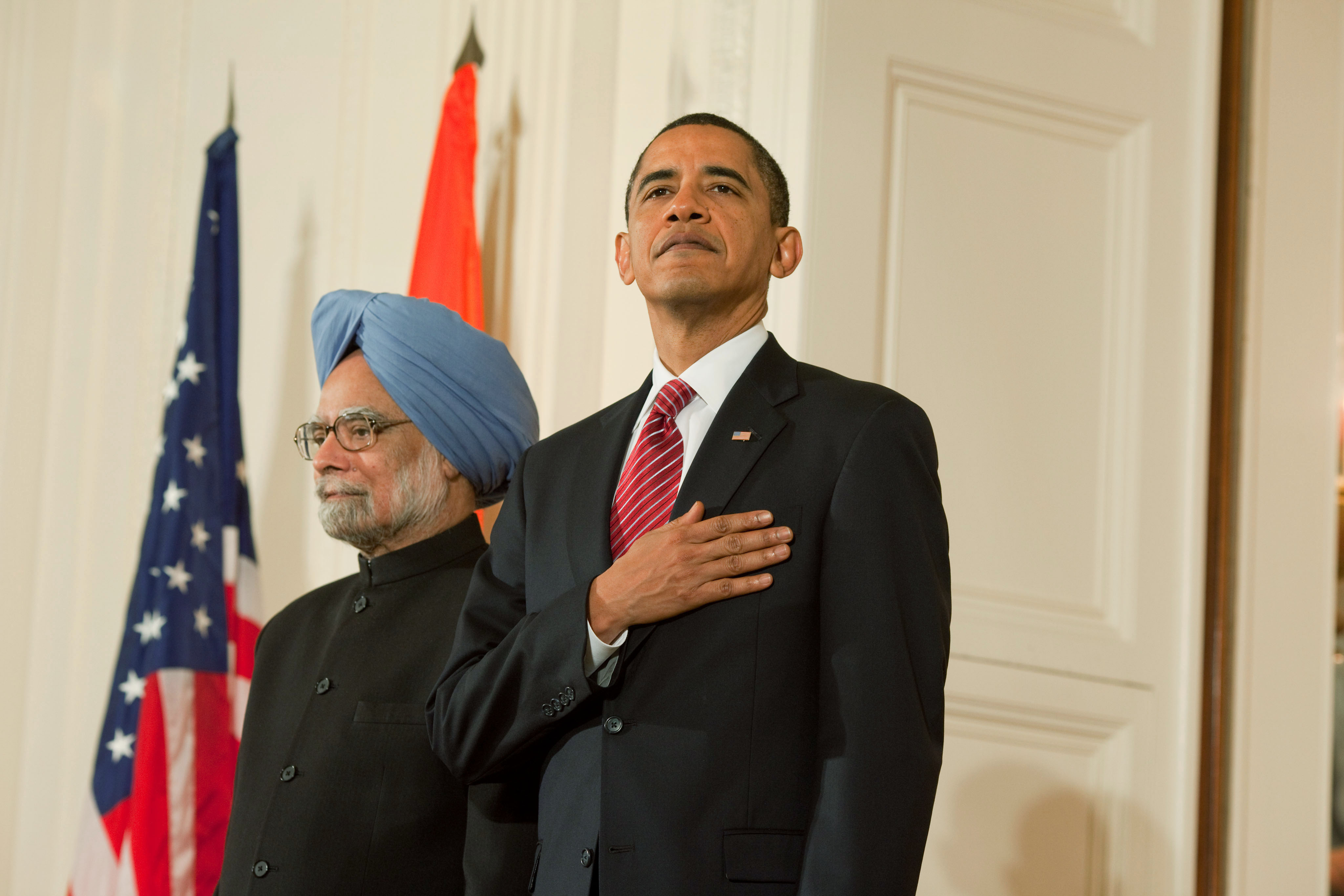
Obama with Manmohan Singh in the East Room of the White House.

- November 24 – The first state dinner of the Obama presidency honoring Indian prime minister Manmohan Singh is held in a reception on the White House grounds.
- November 25 – President Obama officially pardons two turkeys in recognition of Thanksgiving in the United States.
- November 30 – President Obama and Secretary of State Clinton meet Australian prime minister Kevin Rudd.

== December ==
- December 1 – President Obama travels to the United States Military Academy, where he presents his new battle strategy for the War in Afghanistan.
- December 3 – The first family lights the National Christmas Tree.
- December 4 – President Obama goes to Allentown, Pennsylvania, to give a speech.
- December 10 – President Obama accepts the 2009 Nobel Peace Prize at Oslo City Hall in Norway. The president also meets with Norwegian prime minister Jens Stoltenberg, King Harald V, and Queen Sonja.
- December 14 – President Obama meets with members of the financial industry including JPMorgan Chase CEO Jamie Dimon and PNC Financial Services CEO Jim Rohr, to discuss economic recovery, and later meets with Lebanese president Michel Suleiman.
- December 18 – President Obama attends the United Nations Climate Change Conference in Copenhagen.
- December 24 – The Obama family arrives in Oahu, Hawaii, for a 10-day holiday vacation at Plantation Estate.
- December 28 – President Obama makes his first public remarks on the Christmas Day attempted bombing of Northwest Airlines Flight 253.

== See also ==
- Timeline of the Barack Obama presidency (2009–2017)

U.S. presidential administration timelines
Preceded by Bush presidency (2008–2009)	Obama presidency (2009)	Succeeded by Obama presidency (2010)
