= Timeline of the George W. Bush presidency (2007) =

The following is a timeline of the presidency of George W. Bush, from January 1, 2007, to December 31, 2007.

== January ==
- January 2 – Sources in Washington reports expectations that Bush will announce his strategy in Iraq early the following week.
- January 3 – The 110th United States Congress convenes with the Democratic Party is controlling the House of Representatives and the Senate.
- January 3 – Nancy Pelosi is elected as the first female Speaker of the United States House of Representatives.
- January 3 – An opinion column is released of Bush indicating a willingness to work with the Democratic Party-controlled Congress.
- January 7 – President Bush declares Kansas as having a major crisis within the state and orders federal aid.
- January 8 – President Bush commemorates the fifth anniversary of No Child Left Behind in the Oval Office with senators Ted Kennedy and Mike Enzi and Congressman George Miller in the Oval Office.
- January 9 – President Bush announces his selection of Fred Fielding for White House Counsel.
- January 10 – President Bush announces Iraq war troop surge in his address to the nation.
- January 11 – President Bush delivers a speech on the military at Freedom Hall in Fort Benning, Georgia.
- January 23 – President Bush delivers his annual State of the Union Address before a joint session of Congress.
- January 29 – President Bush meets with individuals for talks on the environment at the White House.
- January 30 – President Bush gives an economy speech at the Caterpillar, Inc. while in East Peoria, Illinois.
- January 31 – President Bush delivers a speech on the economy at the Federal Hall in New York City.

== February ==
- February 1 – President Bush delivers a speech at the National Prayer Breakfast at Hilton Washington Hotel in Washington, D.C.
- February 2 – President Bush meets with the Carolina Hurricanes, winners of the 2006 Stanley Cup Finals, in the East Room of the White House.
- February 3 – President Bush gives an address at the issues conference of the Democratic caucus at the Kingsmill Resort & Spa in Williamsburg, Virginia.
- February 5 – President Bush holds a cabinet meeting, later announcing his administration is submitting "a budget to the United States Congress that shows we can balance the budget in five years without raising taxes."
- February 26 – President Bush awards Bruce P. Crandall with the Medal of Honor during a ceremony in the East Room.
- February 27 – President Bush attends and delivers remarks at the swearing-in of John Negroponte as United States Deputy Secretary of State.
- February 28 – President Bush confers with several military service organizations in the Roosevelt Room.

== March ==
- March 1 – President Bush meets some denizens at Lil Dizzy's Café in New Orleans, Louisiana.
- March 2 – President Bush delivers a speech on the reauthorization of the No Child Left Behind Act at Silver Street Elementary School in New Albany, Indiana.
- March 3 – President Bush assures tornado victims of incoming assistance.
- March 5 – President Bush gives an address on his administration's foreign policy while at the Ronald Reagan Building and International Trade Center in Washington, D.C.
- March 22 – President Bush, Secretary of State Condoleezza Rice meet with members of the State Department, United States Agency for International Development, and military at the Dwight D. Eisenhower Executive Office Building.
- March 23 – President Bush delivers a short speech on the emergency supplementals in the Iraq War while in the Diplomatic Reception Room. President Bush observes the Greek War of Independence holiday with an address in the East Room.
- March 24 – President Bush details the struggles of garnering congressional support for the Iraq War during his radio address.
- March 26 – President Bush joins CEOs of various car companies in a demonstration at the South Lawn.
- March 27 – President Bush makes an appearance at a demonstration at the U.S. Postal Service Vehicle Maintenance Facility in Washington.
- March 28 – President Bush delivers a speech on the economy and terrorism at the Holiday Inn on the Hill in Washington.
- March 29 – President Bush gives a speech at North Portico on the budget.
- March 30 – President Bush delivers a speech at the Walter Reed Army Medical Center in Washington.
- March 31 – President Bush meets President of Brazil Luiz Inácio Lula da Silva at Camp David.

== April ==
- April 13 – White House spokeswoman Dana Perino says she would not rule out the White House has lost "a potential 5 million e-mails".
- April 16 – Virginia Tech shooting
- April 17 – President Bush attends a memorial at Virginia Tech.
- April 28 – President Bush delivers the commencement address at Miami Dade College at the Kendall Campus in Florida.
- April 30 – President Bush meets with foreign leaders Angela Merkel and José Barroso at the White House. Bush, Merkel, and Barroso later hold a joint press conference in the Rose Garden.

== May ==
- May 1 – President Bush vetoes a bill by members of both Chambers of Congress that he claims "substitutes the opinions of politicians for the judgment of our military commanders" and explains his reasons for doing so during an address in the evening hours.
- May 2 – President Bush delivers a speech on America's battle against terrorism as well as the US economy at the Willard Hotel in Washington, D.C.
- May 3 – President Bush delivers a speech in dedication of the National Day of Prayer in the East Room.
- May 7 – President Bush and First Lady Laura Bush welcome Queen Elizabeth II and Prince Philip, Duke of Edinburgh to the White House.
- May 8 – President Bush meets with President of Haiti René Préval in the Oval Office, afterwards outlining the ways the US is supporting Haiti during a joint public appearance with the Haitian president.
- May 9 – President Bush travels to Greensburg, Kansas in the aftermath of tornado damage there, pledging the support of the federal government to the city and stating his intent "to lift people's spirits as best as I possibly can and to hopefully touch somebody's soul by representing our country, and to let people know that while there was a dark day in the past, there's brighter days ahead."
- May 10 – President Bush gives a press briefing at the Defense Department.
- May 11 – President Bush presents the President's Volunteer Service Awards and dedicates Military Spouse Day in the East Room of the White House.
- May 13 – President Bush delivers a speech in at anniversary park in Williamsburg, Virginia commemorating the four hundredth anniversary of the Jamestown, Virginia settlement.
- May 14 – President Bush gives a speech on CAFE and Alternative Fuel Standards in the Rose Garden at the White House.
- May 15 – President Bush delivers a speech at a memorial service for the Annual Peace Officers in Washington, D.C.
- May 20 – President Bush releases a statement on the 105th anniversary of Cuba gaining independence.
- May 21 – President Bush and Secretary General of NATO Jaap de Hoop Scheffer hold a joint press conference at Bush Ranch in Crawford, Texas.
- May 24 – President Bush holds a press conference in the Rose Garden and talks about the ongoing conflict in Iraq as well as an immigration reform policy being considered by Congress during the morning hours. President Bush announces his nomination of Dr. James Holsinger, Jr. for United States Surgeon General.
- May 25 – President Bush meets with service members at the Naval Medical Center in Bethesda, Maryland.
- May 26 – President Bush discusses Memorial Day and service members' stories of being on duty while delivering his radio address.
- May 28 – President Bush makes an appearance at Arlington National Cemetery in commemoration of Memorial Day.
- May 29 – President Bush delivers a speech on immigration reform at the Federal Law Enforcement Center in Glynco, Georgia. President Bush speaks out on the Darfur genocide in the Diplomatic Reception Room at the White House.
- May 30 – President Bush announces a $30 Billion HIV/AIDS Plan set for five years in the Rose Garden at the White House. President Bush announces his nomination of Robert Zoellick for President Of The World Bank during an appearance in the Roosevelt Room.
- May 31 – President Bush gives a speech about the international development agenda of the United States at the Ronald Reagan Building and International Trade Center in Washington. It is announced that President Bush will meet with Prime Minister of Israel Ehud Olmert during the following month.

== June ==
- June 1 – President Bush delivers a speech on immigration in Room 350 of the Eisenhower Executive Office Building.
- June 2 – President Bush discusses disease and education initiatives during his radio address.
- June 3 – Vice President Cheney delivers remarks and answers questions at the Wyoming Boys State Conference in Douglas, Wyoming.
- June 4 – Nominations for administration positions are sent to the Senate.
- June 5 – President Bush delivers a speech at the Large Hall in Czernin Palace in Prague, Czech Republic.
- June 6 – President Bush meets with Prime Minister of Japan Shinzō Abe to discuss North Korea in Heiligendamm. President Bush also meets with Chancellor of Germany Angela Merkel in Heiligendamm.
- June 7 – President Bush meets with Prime Minister of the United Kingdom Tony Blair and President of Russia Vladimir Putin in Heiligendamm.
- June 8 – President Bush and President of Poland Lech Kaczyński give a joint statement at the Gdańsk Lech Walesa International Airport in Gdańsk, Poland.
- June 9 – President Bush holds a joint press conference with Prime Minister of Italy Romano Prodi at Chigi Palace in Rome, Italy. President Bush participates in a roundtable at the Italian U.S. Embassy.
- June 10 – President Bush holds a joint press conference with Prime Minister of Albania Sali Berisha at the Courtyard Council of Ministers in Tirana, Albania. President Bush meets with small business owners there and later issues a statement thanking them for their participation.
- June 11 – President Bush holds a joint press conference with President of Bulgaria Georgi Parvanov at the Archaeological Museum in Sofia, Bulgaria.
- June 12 – President Bush delivers a speech at memorial honoring victims of communism in Washington, D.C.
- June 13 – President Bush announces Ed Gillespie for Counselor to the President in the Oval Office.
- June 14 – President Bush delivers a speech on immigration reform at the Capital Hilton Hotel in Washington, D.C.
- June 15 – President Bush delivers a speech at the National Hispanic Prayer Breakfast hosted at JW Marriott Hotel in Washington, D.C. during the early morning hours. Hours later, President Bush arrives at the McConnell Air Force Base in Wichita, Kansas.
- June 16 – President Bush speaks about taxes and reform through Congress during his radio address.
- June 18 – President Bush delivers remarks at a gathering of NCAA Championship Teams in the South Lawn of the White House. President Bush signs into law a reauthorization of the Indian Housing Loan Guarantee Program known as the Native American Home Ownership Opportunity Act of 2007.
- June 19 – President Bush meets with Prime Minister of Israel Ehud Olmert in the Oval Office of the White House.
- June 21 – President Bush delivers a speech on energy at the Browns Ferry Nuclear Plant in Athens, Alabama.
- June 22 – President Bush meets with President of Vietnam Nguyen Minh Triet at the White House in the Oval Office.
- June 25 – President Bush gives a speech on the reauthorizing of No Child Left Behind and presidential scholars in the East Room.
- June 26 – President Bush delivers a speech on immigration reform in Room 350 of the Eisenhower Executive Office Building. President Bush issues a memorandum to the Secretaries of State and Defense (Powell and Rumsfeld).
- June 27 – President Bush delivers remarks at the seventh annual White House Tee Ball Game.
- June 28 – President Bush announces the nominations of Michael Mullen and James Cartwright for chairman and vice chairman of the Joint Chiefs of Staff in the Roosevelt Room. President Bush delivers a speech on the war on terror in the Spruance Auditorium of Naval War College in Newport, Rhode Island.
- June 29 – President Bush issues a statement on Independence Day.

== July ==
- July 1 – President Bush says that he has a press conference the following day after being asked about the Glasgow Airport attack while at Walker's Point in Kennebunkport, Maine.
- July 2 – President Bush meets with President of Russia Vladimir Putin in at Walker's Port in Kennebunkport and signs an extension of the Andean Trade Preference Act.
- July 3 – President Bush travels to Walter Reed Army Medical Center in Washington, D.C., and signs a designation of a facility of the United States Postal Service as the Dr. Francis Townsend Post Office Building in the form of S. 1352 and an extension of programs authorized under the Higher Education Act of 1965 through July 31, 2007 in the form of S. 1704.
- July 9 – President Bush delivers remarks and participates in a discussion about South and Central America in the Hyatt Regency Crystal City in Arlington, Virginia.
- July 10 – President Bush gives a speech and answers questions at the Intercontinental Hotel Cleveland in Cleveland, Ohio.
- July 11 – President Bush delivers a budget speech in Room 450 at the Eisenhower Executive Office Building.
- July 17 – President Bush meets with Secretary-General of the United Nations Ban Ki-moon in the Oval Office in the White House.
- July 18 – President Bush gives a speech on healthcare during an appearance at Man and Machine, Inc. in Landover, Maryland.
- July 19 – President Bush delivers a speech and answers questions on the budget during an appearance at the Gaylord Opryland Resort and Convention Center in Nashville, Tennessee.
- July 20 – President Bush delivers a speech on the military in the Rose Garden.
- July 21 – President Bush undergoes a colonoscopy at Bethesda Naval Hospital. Vice President Cheney serves as acting president for approximately two hours, under section 3 of the 25th Amendment.
- July 24 – President Bush delivers a speech on terrorism at the Charleston Air Force Base in Charleston, South Carolina. President Bush declares Nebraska as having a major disaster within it, ordering federal aid for the assistance of relief efforts. President Bush releases a statement noting the seventeenth anniversary of the Americans with Disabilities Act of 1990, saying his administration has built upon "this landmark legislation."
- July 25 – President Bush is briefed in the Oval Office "about how to make sure that our wounded heroes get the best possible care from the Defense Department and the Veterans Affairs Department" by former United States Secretary of Health and Human Services Donna Shalala and Senator Bob Dole.
- July 27 – President Bush delivers remarks on the economy in the Roosevelt Room, saying in part, "The world is strong -- the world economy is strong. I happen to believe one of the main reasons why is because we remain strong. And my pledge to the American people is we will keep your taxes low to make sure the economy continues to remain strong, and we'll be wise about how we spend your money in Washington, D.C. I submitted a budget that will be in balance at 2012, and I look forward to working with Congress to achieve that goal."
- July 30 – President Bush holds a joint press conference with Prime Minister of the United Kingdom Gordon Brown at Camp David.
- July 31 – President Bush signs an extension of programs authorized under the Higher Education Act of 1965 through October 31, 2007 in the form of the Second Higher Education Extension Act of 2007.

== August ==
- August 27 – United States Attorney General Alberto Gonzales announces that he will resign. President Bush in responding remarks within the morning hours calls Gonzales a "man of integrity, decency and principle. And I have reluctantly accepted his resignation, with great appreciation for the service that he has provided for our country."
- August 28 – President Bush gives a speech at 89th Annual National Convention of the American Legion at the Reno-Sparks Convention Center in Reno, Nevada during the morning. Bush later attends a meeting of community leaders at the Dooky Chase Restaurant in New Orleans, Louisiana during the night hours.
- August 29 – President Bush delivers a speech on New Orleans restoration at the Martin Luther King, Jr. Charter School for Science and Technology in New Orleans, Louisiana.
- August 30 – President Bush releases a statement expressing dismay with the Burmese regime.
- August 31 – President Bush delivers a speech on homeownership financing in the Rose Garden. President Bush announces Press Secretary Tony Snow's resignation and his nomination of Dana Perino as his successor while in the James S. Brady Briefing Room. President Bush releases a statement on Senator John Warner announcing his retirement upon the completion of his current term.

== September ==
- September 1 – President Bush discusses public housing and homeownership during his radio address.
- September 3 – President Bush meets with President of Iraq Nouri al-Maliki at the Al-Asad Airbase in Al-Anbar Province, Iraq.
- September 4 – President Bush and Prime Minister of Australia John Howard hold a joint press conference at the InterContinental Sydney in Sydney, Australia.
- September 5 – President Bush and Prime Minister Howard hold a joint visit with members of the Australian Defence Force at Garden Island in Sydney, Australia. President Bush issues a statement on the death of Paul Gilmor.
- September 6 – President Bush meets with President of China Hu Jintao at the InterContinental Sydney in Sydney, Australia.

== October ==
- October 1 – President Bush gives a speech at the memorial service to General Peter Pace in Fort Myer, Virginia during the morning. President Bush designates the first Monday of October "Child Health Day".
- October 2 – President Bush announces Texas as having a major disaster within it and orders federal aid.
- October 3 – President Bush gives a speech to the Lancaster Chamber of Commerce at the Jay Group, Inc. in Lancaster, Pennsylvania during the morning.
- October 4 – President Bush gives a speech while attending the Iftaar Dinner at the State Dining Room of the White House during the evening.
- October 17 – President Bush at a press conference at the White House gave an update on the Iraq War and stated "The Iraq situation cannot be won by military means alone. There has to be political reconciliation to go with it. There has to be an emergence of a democracy. That's been my position ever since it started. Al Qaeda is still dangerous. They're dangerous in Iraq, they're dangerous elsewhere. Al Qaeda is not going to go away anytime soon. That's why it's important for us to be finding out what their intentions are, and what are their plans, so we can respond to them".
- October 18 – President Bush meets with President of Liberia Ellen Johnson Sirleaf in the Oval Office of the White House.
- October 19 – President Bush delivers a speech on Burma sanctions in the Diplomatic Reception Room in the White House.
- October 20 – President Bush signs Executive Order 13449 at the Chesapeake Bay Maritime Museum in St. Michael's, Maryland.
- October 21 – Vice President Cheney delivers a speech on foreign relations and its effect on the United States in Lansdowne, Virginia.
- October 22 – President Bush presents Michael P. Murphy with the Medal of Honor in the East Room of the White House.
- October 23 – President Bush delivers a speech on the international war on terror at the National Defense University in Washington, D.C. The nominations of James Shinn for Assistant Secretary of Defense and Robert A. Sturgell for Administrator of the Federal Aviation Administration are sent to the Senate.
- October 24 – President Bush delivers an address on the administration's policy toward Cuba at the U.S. Department of State in Washington, D.C.
- October 25 – President Bush delivers a speech in the Rancho Bernardo Neighborhood in San Diego, California.
- October 26 – President Bush meets with President of the Democratic Republic of the Congo Joseph Kabila at the White House.
- October 27 – President Bush discusses California during his radio address.
- October 29 – President Bush announces the Presidential Medal of Freedom recipients.
- October 30 – President Bush delivers an address calling on Congress to pass appropriations bills while in the North Lawn of the White House.
- October 31 – President Bush announces his nomination of Ed Schafer for United States Secretary of Agriculture in the Roosevelt Room.

== November ==
- November 1 – President Bush delivers a speech on the global war against terrorism at The Heritage Foundation in Washington, D.C.
- November 2 – President Bush issues a statement expressing sympathies with the families of victims in the Ocean Isle Beach, North Carolina fire.
- November 3 – President Bush discusses the importance of Judge Michael Mukasey becoming the next United States attorney general during his radio address.
- November 5 – President Bush delivers a speech at a ceremony honoring Medial of Freedom recipients in the East Room. President Bush meets with Prime Minister of Turkey Recep Tayyip Erdoğan in the Oval Office at the White House, later in the day holding a joint press conference.
- November 6 – President Bush delivers a speech on international trade and investment in Room 350 at the Dwight D. Eisenhower Executive Building.
- November 7 – President Bush and President of France Nicolas Sarkozy hold a joint press conference at Mount Vernon Estate in Mount Vernon, Virginia.
- November 8 – President Bush delivers a speech on supporting service members and the Wounded Warriors Project while at the Brooke Army Medical Center in San Antonio, Texas.
- November 9 – President Bush meets with Chancellor of Germany Angela Merkel at his ranch in Crawford, Texas.
- November 21 – President Bush announces his plans to nominate Neil Romano for United States Assistant Secretary of Labor, Douglas H. Shulman for Commissioner of Internal Revenue at the Department of the Treasury, and seven members to the board of governors of the American Red Cross.
- November 22 – For Thanksgiving, President Bush telephones multiple service members to express his appreciation for their volunteerism.
- November 24 – President Bush talks about being thankful for others during his radio address.
- November 25 – President Bush releases a public statement on the upcoming arrival of Prime Minister of Israel Ehud Olmert and the Annapolis Conference.
- November 26 – President Bush meets with Prime Minister of Israel Ehud Olmert at the White House. The two deliver public remarks in a joint appearance afterward. President Bush releases a statement praising Trent Lott and his Senate career, the latter having announced earlier in the day that he would resign by the end of the year.
- November 27 – President Bush attends the Annapolis Conference in Annapolis, Maryland, delivering a speech there.
- November 28 – President Bush delivers short remarks on the Annapolis Conference in the Rose Garden of the White House.
- November 29 – President Bush delivers a speech on funding the war on terror at the Pentagon in Arlington, Virginia.
- November 29 – First Lady Laura Bush unveils the Christmas decorations at the White House for the seventh time.
- November 30 – Acknowledging the following day as being World AIDS Day, President Bush delivers a speech on HIV/AIDS at Calvary United Methodist Church in Mount Airy, Maryland. President Bush declares a major disaster within Indiana and orders federal aid.

== December ==
- December 1 – President Bush talks about Congress and their needing to pass legislation having to do with the ongoing Iraq War when they return from recess during his radio address.
- December 3 – President Bush issues a statement wishing "all people of the Jewish faith a Happy Hanukkah."
- December 4 – President Bush holds a press conference where he stresses the importance of Congress in the James S. Brady Press Briefing Room. Bush issues a statement on Congress having designated December 7 as "National Pearl Harbor Remembrance Day".
- December 5 – President Bush attends a healthcare meeting at the One World Community Health Center in Omaha, Nebraska.
- December 8 – President Bush announces Oregon has a major disaster within it and has ordered federal aid.
- December 10 – President Bush meets with Judaism-practicing individuals and announces his recognition of the day as International Human Rights Day while speaking in the Roosevelt Room in the White House.
- December 12 – President Bush announces Missouri is having a state emergency and his order of federal funding to assist in quelling the aforementioned problem.
- December 13 – President Bush meets with President of Nigeria Umaru Musa Yar'Adua in the Oval Office at the White House and later Bush and Yar'Adua hold a joint press conference during the morning hours.
- December 14 – President Bush and President of Peru Alan García during a joint appearance at the Dwight D. Eisenhower Executive Office Building sign H.R. 3688, which President Bush says will advance "free and fair trade with one of the fastest growing economies in the Western Hemisphere."
- December 15 – President Bush stresses funding for front line soldiers is America's top priority during his radio address. President Bush issues a statement on the death of Julia Carson.
- December 17 – President Bush delivers a speech on the economy and takes questions from the audience at the Holiday Inn in North Fredericksburg, Virginia.
- December 18 – President Bush delivers remarks during a visit to Little Sisters of the Poor in Washington, D.C.
- December 19 – Press Secretary Dana Perino says President Bush and Vice President Cheney were in the West Wing of the White House during the Eisenhower Executive Office Building's fire during a press briefing.
- December 21 – President Bush issues a statement sending his, First Lady Bush's, and the United States' best wishes to service members.
- December 22 – President Bush speaks on service members and their families in addition to relating stories about individuals dealing with similar experiences during the holidays while delivering his radio address.
- December 24 – President Bush makes phone calls to service members stationed abroad on Christmas Eve.
- December 26 – President Bush announces that he has signed H.R. 2764 into law, legislation that he says during the announcement will "fund the Federal Government within the reasonable and responsible spending levels I proposed -- without raising taxes and without the most objectionable policy changes considered by the Congress."
- December 27 – President Bush publicly addresses the assassination of Benazir Bhutto while in Crawford, Texas.
- December 28 – President Bush issues a disapproval memorandum on the National Defense Authorization Act for Fiscal Year 2008, citing that it will "imperil billions of dollars of Iraqi assets at a crucial juncture in that nation's reconstruction efforts and because it would undermine the foreign policy and commercial interests of the United States."
- December 29 – President Bush reflects on issues of spending and relations with Congress during his radio address.
- December 31 – President Bush signs into law an amendment of the Freedom of Information Act, the Openness Promotes Effectiveness in our National Government Act of 2007 or S. 2488. President Bush releases a statement on the upcoming New Year's Day, reflecting on the administration's efforts throughout 2007.

== See also ==
- Timeline of the George W. Bush presidency, for an index of the Bush presidency timeline articles

U.S. presidential administration timelines
Preceded by Bush presidency (2006)	Bush presidency (2007)	Succeeded by Bush presidency (2008–2009)
