= 2004 United States presidential debates =

Part of the 2004 U.S. presidential election

- September 30, 2004; October 8, 2004; October 13, 2004
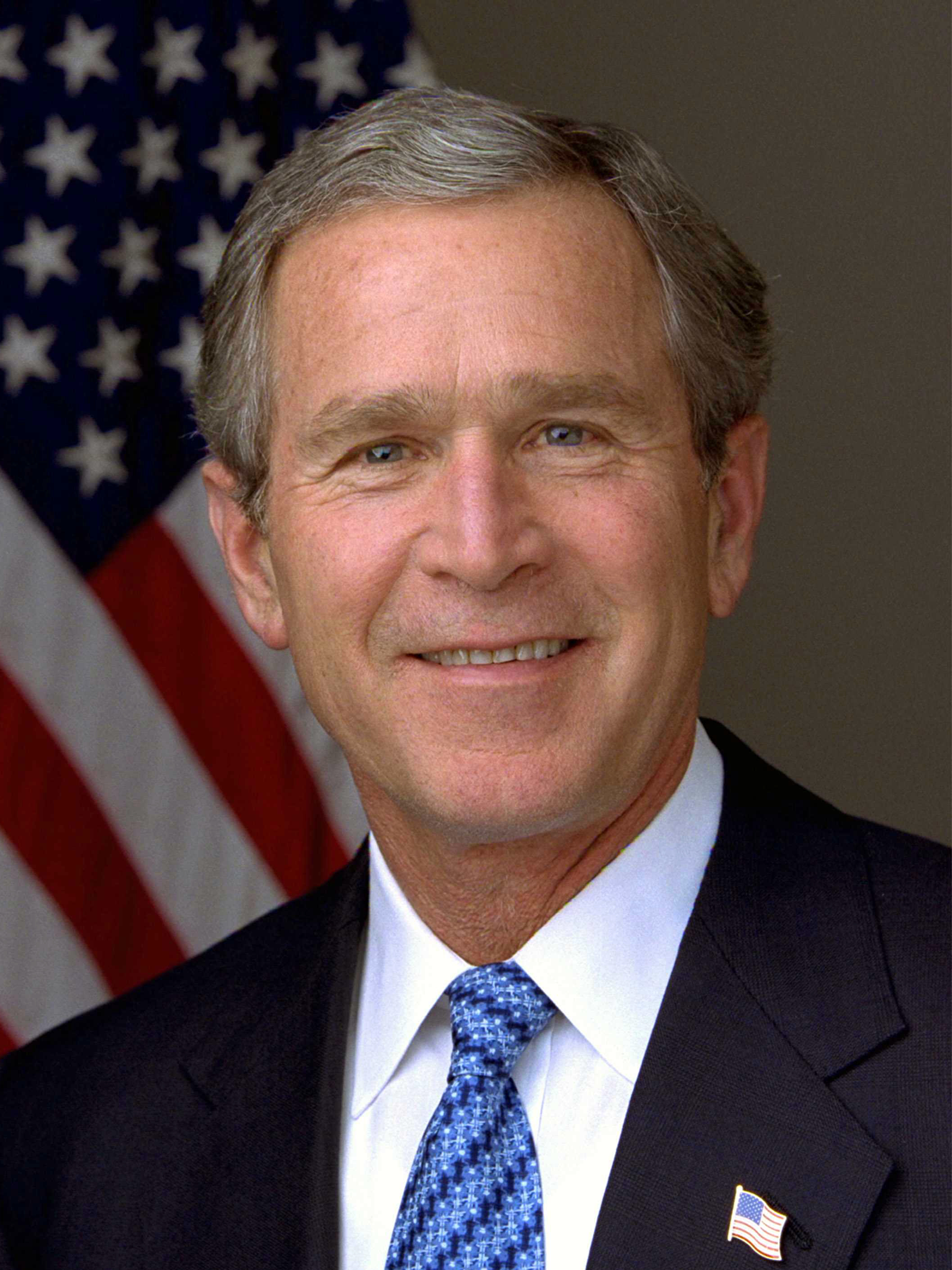

Nominee	George W. Bush	John Kerry
Party	Republican	Democratic
Home state	Texas	Massachusetts
- 2004 United States vice presidential debate
- October 5, 2004
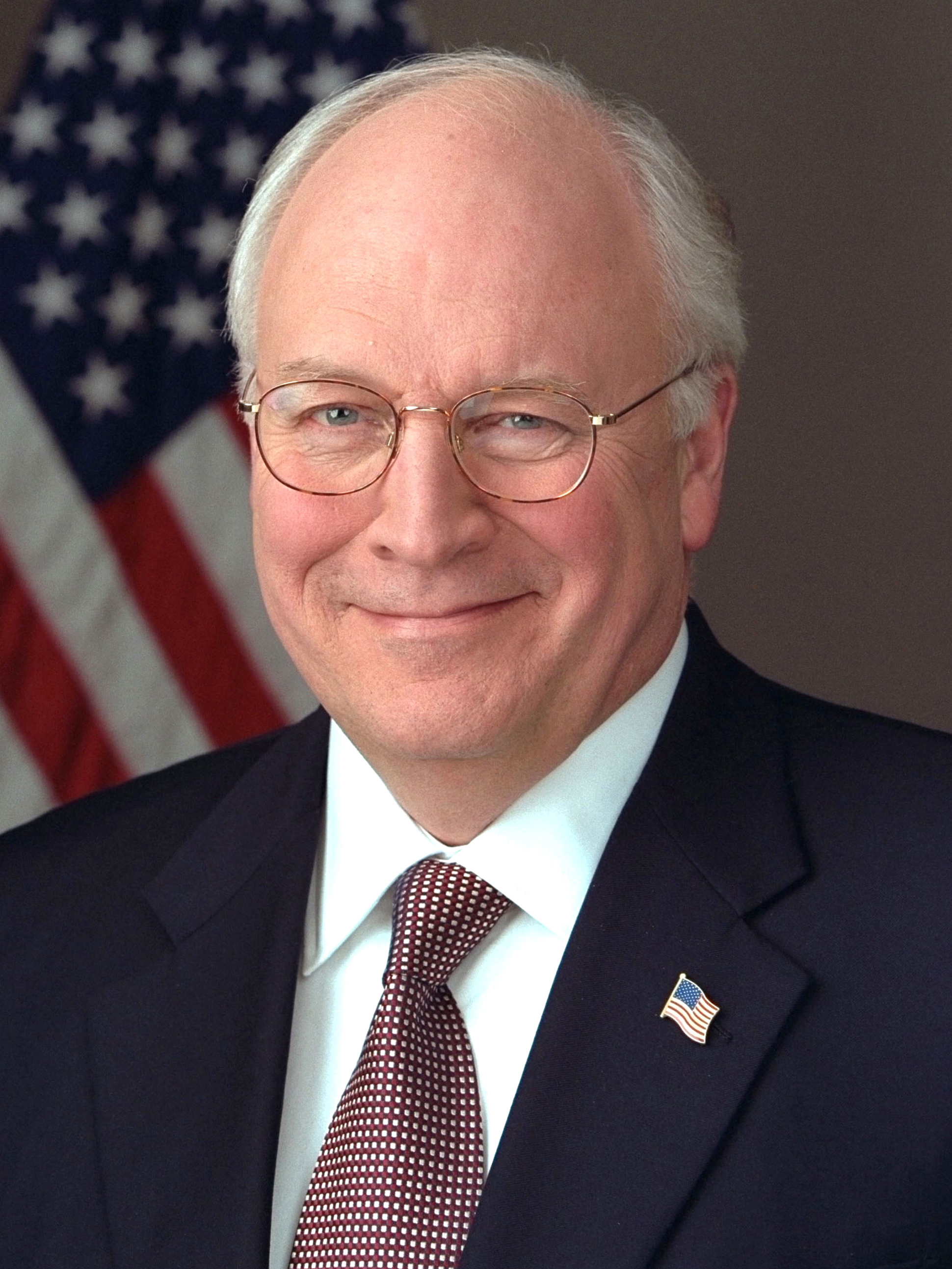

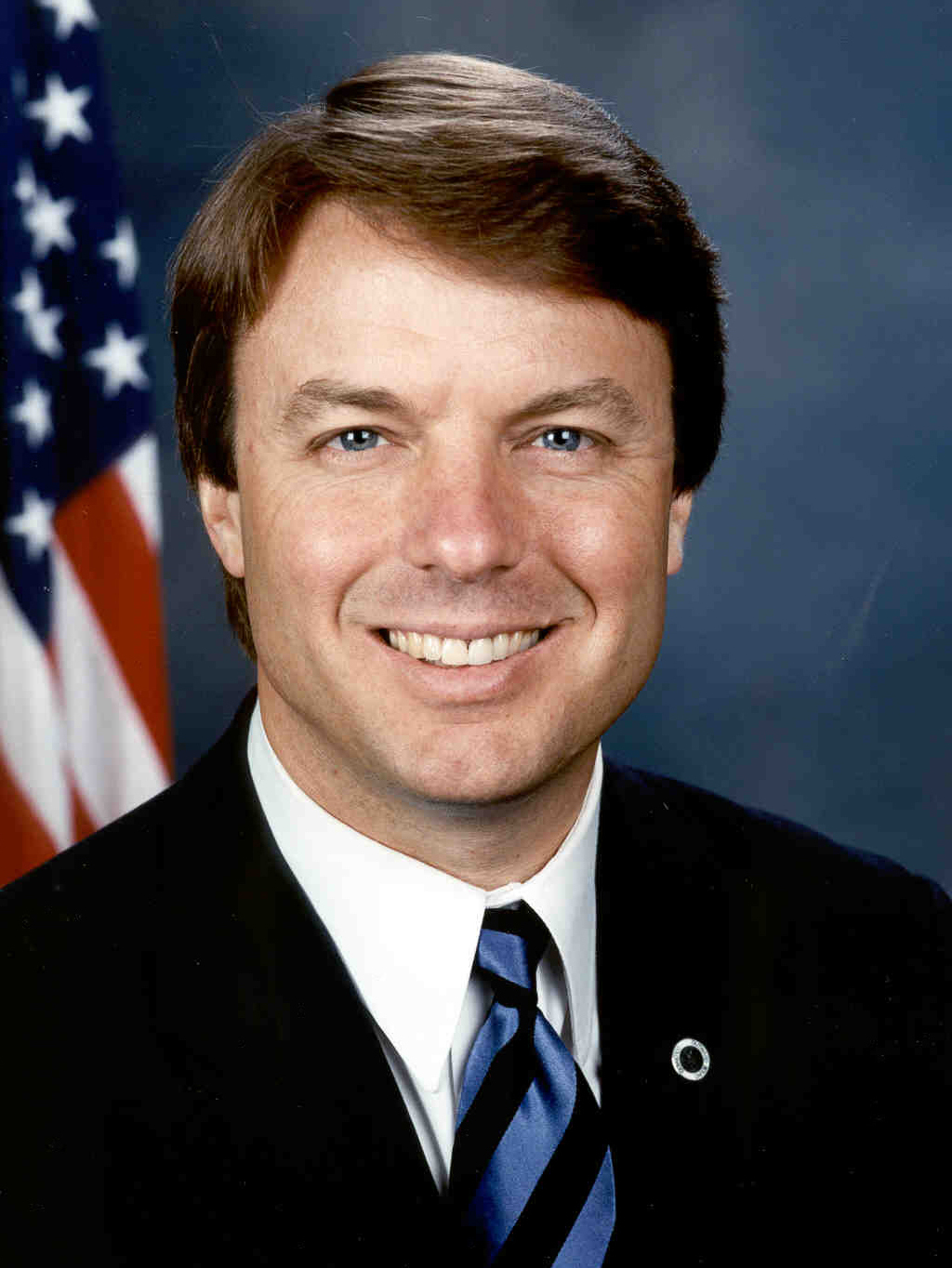
Nominee	Dick Cheney	John Edwards
Party	Republican	Democratic
Home state	Wyoming	North Carolina

The 2004 United States presidential debates were a series of debates held during the 2004 presidential election.

The Commission on Presidential Debates (CPD), a bipartisan organization formed in 1987, organized four debates among the major party candidates, and sponsored three presidential debates and one vice presidential debate. Only Republican nominee George W. Bush and Democratic nominee John Kerry met the criteria for inclusion in the debates, and thus were the only two to appear in the debates sponsored by the CPD. The CPD-sponsored vice presidential debate took place between their respective vice presidential running mates, Dick Cheney and John Edwards.

An alternative was proposed by the Citizens' Debate Commission, but was not carried out. There were several third-party candidate debates also held independently from the CPD-sponsored debates. The debates were the latest in a series of presidential debates first held during the 1960 presidential election and held every four years since the 1976 election.

Post-debate polls generally suggested that the 2004 presidential debates were a positive factor for John Kerry's candidacy, as CNN/USA Today/Gallup immediate post-debate polls showed that Kerry clearly won the first and third debates in the eyes of the American television audience, and he tied with Bush in the second. In the follow-up polls taken days after the first two debates, Kerry's perceived positive performance in the debates increased, so that the public then saw Kerry, rather than Bush, as the winner of all three debates.

== Participant selection ==
According to the Commission on Presidential Debates, the predetermined criteria for selecting candidates to participate in its 2004 presidential debates are based on evidence of eligibility as defined in Article Two of the United States Constitution), evidence of ballot access, and evidence of electoral support based on national public opinion polls.

Participants must have appeared on enough state ballots to have at least a mathematical chance of securing the Electoral College majority needed to win the election. While several third-party candidates met the eligibility and ballot access criteria, none had the support of at least 15 percent of the national electorate based on the average of five selected national public opinion polling organizations. The criteria also specified that invitations to the CPD's vice-presidential debate would be extended to the running mates of the candidates participating in the first presidential debate.

Only President George W. Bush and U.S. Senator John Kerry met the CPD selection criteria for any of the presidential debates. As a result, only Vice President Dick Cheney and Senator John Edwards met the criteria for the vice presidential debate.

On October 1, 2004, the Arizona Libertarian Party (AZLP) filed suit against the Commission on Presidential Debates and Arizona State University in the Superior Court of Arizona for Maricopa County regarding the staging of the third presidential debate. They contested that the debate, to be held on the grounds of and partially funded by a state university, constituted an illegal in kind campaign donation because it excluded Michael Badnarik, the Libertarian candidate. (Only Bush, Kerry, and Badnarik had ballot access in Arizona.) In the complaint the Arizona Libertarian Party alleged that ASU was "making a donation to two individual campaigns [Bush and Kerry] through the Commission on Presidential Debates as a conduit, in violation of the Arizona Constitution's prohibition on making gifts or donations to individuals or corporations."

Superior Court Judge F. Pendleton Gaines III issued an order to show cause for the president of ASU and for the director of the CPD to appear in court for a hearing on October 12, a day before the scheduled debate. Gaines denied a restraining order on the grounds of laches and that there was a sufficient public purpose for the debate, but also ruled that the AZLP could continue to pursue damages for any violations to their constitutional rights.

The Arizona debate nonetheless proceeded on October 13.

On October 8, at the second debate at Washington University in St. Louis, Badnarik and another third-party nominee, Green candidate David Cobb, were arrested in a civil disobedience action after crossing a police line outside the debate venue to protest their exclusion from the debate. Badnarik said he was attempting to serve the order to show cause; both candidates were released after being ticketed for trespassing and refusing a reasonable order from a policeman.

== Presidential debates memorandum of understanding ==
A memorandum of understanding (MOU) between the Bush 2004 campaign and the Kerry 2004 campaign, covering in minute detail all aspects of the presidential candidate debates held between the two candidates was created. It was 32 pages long and dated September 20, 2004.

The Citizens' Debate Commission (CDC) and others were instrumental in getting the campaigns to publish the MOU in advance of the debates. One of the commissioners of the CDC, George Farah, has written about the earlier debate MOUs in the 2004 tome No Debate: How the Republican and Democratic Parties Secretly Control the Presidential Debates.

== Debate schedule ==
2004 United States presidential election debates
No.	Date & time	Host	Location	Moderator	Participants	
Key: P Participant. N Non-invitee.					Republican	Democratic
Key: P Participant. N Non-invitee.					President George W. Bush of Texas	Senator John Kerry of Massachusetts
1	Thursday, September 30, 2004, 9:00 – 10:30 p.m. EDT	University of Miami	Coral Gables, Florida	Jim Lehrer of PBS	P	P
2	Friday, October 8, 2004, 9:00 – 10:30 p.m. EDT	Washington University in St. Louis	St. Louis, Missouri	Charles Gibson of ABC	P	P
3	Wednesday, October 13, 2004, 9:00 – 10:30 p.m. EDT	Arizona State University	Tempe, Arizona	Bob Schieffer of CBS	P	P
2004 United States vice presidential debate
No.	Date & time	Host	Location	Moderator	Participants	
Key: P Participant. N Non-invitee.					Republican	Democratic
Key: P Participant. N Non-invitee.					Vice President Dick Cheney of Wyoming	Senator John Edwards of North Carolina
VP	Tuesday, October 5, 2004, 9:00 – 10:30 p.m. EDT	Case Western Reserve University	Cleveland, Ohio	Gwen Ifill of PBS	P	P

Originally, the CPD specified that the first debate would be focused on domestic policy and the third focused on foreign policy. Those terms were changed in an announcement by the CPD on September 24, after it had reviewed the terms of the MOU. The CPD agreed that foreign affairs and homeland security would be the primary topic for the first debate and domestic and economic policy will be the primary topic of the third debate. More broadly, it also agreed to make a "good faith effort" to accommodate the rest of the terms of the MOU.

The September 24 announcement, which was released in the format of a copy of a letter sent to the two campaigns, also noted CPD's pleasure at the willingness of the two campaigns to participate in the second, "town meeting"-style debate, yet was ambiguous about just what had been agreed to.

Originally, the CPD had announced that questions for the second debate would come from undecided voters selected by the Gallup Organization from the standard metropolitan statistical area surrounding the host city. This had been the policy followed for the 1992, 1996, and 2000 debates. But the September 24 letter to the two candidates did not comment on this; instead, it noted that campaign representatives can discuss participant selection methodology with Dr. Frank Newport of Gallup in order to resolve any open issues. One such issue was that the MOU specified that half the questions be asked by "soft Kerry supporters" and half by "soft Bush supporters," though what was meant by those terms was not made clear.

== Format ==
For 2004, each debate lasted ninety minutes, included a live audience, had no opening statements, could have included follow-up questions from the moderator, and ended with closing statements of two minutes.

== September 30: First presidential debate (University of Miami) ==
First presidential debate
- Date(s): September 30, 2004
- Duration: 90 minutes
- Venue: University of Miami
- Location: Coral Gables, Florida
- Participants: George W. Bush; John Kerry
- Footage: PBS
- Moderator(s): Jim Lehrer of PBS

The first presidential debate between President George W. Bush and Senator John Kerry, took place on Thursday, September 30, 2004, in the Convocation Center of the University of Miami in Coral Gables, Florida.

The debate was moderated by Jim Lehrer of PBS' The NewsHour posed nine questions for each candidate.

=== Video stream ===
- RealPlayer video stream of the debate from the BBC website
- Video and stream of the debate from the Internet Archive

=== Post-debate poll ===
62.5 million people tuned in to the debates, an increase of just over 35 percent from 2000.

=== Controversies ===
==== Bush's suit bulge ====
A bulge in the back of Bush's suit jacket during this debate triggered rumors that he was "wired" with a radio receiver, presumably to receive instructions from his strategists. Contributing to the rumors was the perception that, at one point, Bush stated "Let me finish" in response to no apparent interruption and when he still had time on the clock, and some long pauses by Bush before he began answering a question. Others dismissed these accusations, saying that the "Let me finish" was a response to a gesture that Lehrer made, and the pauses were a result of Bush gathering his thoughts before responding.

White House officials initially claimed that the bulge was a "wrinkle in the fabric," and that Bush was not wearing a bullet-proof vest, as many conjectured. Bush's tailor later said that the bulge was nothing more than a pucker along the jacket's back seam, according to The Seattle Times. After the election, unidentified sources in the Secret Service told The Hill that Bush was wearing a bullet-proof vest and that campaign handlers had not admitted it earlier for security reasons.

In 2020, NBC News referred to the 2004 microphone earpiece allegations as a "conspiracy theory" and likened the allegations to unfounded right-wing claims that Hillary Clinton wore a microphone in a 2016 debate, or that Joe Biden wore an earpiece in a 2020 debate.

==== "You forgot Poland" ====
During the debate John Kerry accused Bush of having failed to gain international support for the 2003 invasion of Iraq, saying "... when we went in, there were three countries: Great Britain, Australia and the United States. That's not a grand coalition. We can do better." Bush, who had used Poland earlier in the debate as an example of the international presence in Iraq, replied by saying "Well, actually, he forgot Poland. And now there's 30 nations involved, standing side by side with our American troops." Paraphrased as "You forgot Poland", the term became a popular catchphrase among Bush detractors, who saw it as a humorously petty rebuttal of Kerry's original point.

== October 5: Vice presidential debate (Case Western Reserve University) ==
Vice presidential debate
- Date(s): October 5, 2004
- Duration: 90 minutes
- Venue: Case Western Reserve University
- Location: Cleveland, Ohio
- Participants: Dick Cheney; John Edwards
- Footage: PBS
- Moderator(s): Gwen Ifill of PBS

=== Venue ===
The only vice presidential debate between Vice President Dick Cheney and Senator John Edwards took place on Tuesday, October 5, 2004, at the Veale Center at Case Western Reserve University in Cleveland, Ohio. The debate attracted a large audience; 43.6 million people tuned in, nearly as many as had watched the presidential debates in 2000.

The debate was moderated by Gwen Ifill of PBS, who posed a total of 20 questions to the candidates.

=== Video stream ===
- RealPlayer video stream of the debate from the BBC website
- Video and stream of the debate from the Internet Archive

=== Notable exchanges ===
Though the debate largely focused on the 2003 invasion of Iraq, the economy and gay marriage, media coverage focused on a few key exchanges between the two candidates. Cheney told Edwards, referring to his absenteeism, that "the first time I met you was tonight." Edwards pointedly referred to Cheney's lesbian daughter Mary, asking whether Cheney was "...willing to talk about the fact that [Cheney and his wife Lynne] have a gay daughter?" Later Kerry also made similar remarks at the third presidential debate.

=== Post-debate poll ===
CBS News interviewed a nationally representative sample of 178 uncommitted debate-watchers. The sample was of voters who are either undecided about whom to vote for or who have a weak preference that could be changed. Of the group 41 percent said Edwards won the debate, 28 said Cheney won, and 31 percent thought it was a tie. Both uncommitted men and uncommitted women preferred Edwards. A separate poll of 1000 likely voters found that 43 percent believed Cheney won while 37 percent felt Edwards did better. Moreover, after the debate 47 percent said that Cheney was "very qualified" to assume the responsibilities of president (a seven percent rise), while only 25 percent said the same of Edwards (no change).

== October 8: Second presidential debate (Washington University in St. Louis) ==
Second presidential debate
- Date(s): October 8, 2004
- Duration: 90 minutes
- Venue: Washington University in St. Louis
- Location: St. Louis, Missouri
- Participants: George W. Bush; John Kerry
- Footage: PBS
- Moderator(s): Charles Gibson of ABC

=== Venue ===
The second presidential debate between President George W. Bush and Senator John Kerry took place on Friday, October 8, 2004, at Washington University in St. Louis, Missouri.

The town hall style debate was moderated by Charles Gibson of ABC, which consisted of prospective voters reading questions preselected by Gibson to the candidates.

=== Video stream ===
- RealPlayer video stream of the debate from the BBC website
- Video and stream of the debate from the Internet Archive

=== Analysis ===
Bush attempted to deflect criticism of what was described as his scowling demeanor during the first debate, joking at one point about one of Kerry's remarks, "That answer almost made me want to scowl".

When asked about possible appointments to the Supreme Court, Bush replied he would not pick the type of judge who would support the Dred Scott decision. Because that case dealt with slavery, abolished in the United States almost 150 years earlier, commentators such as Timothy Noah thought Bush's comment was aimed at anti-abortion voters who see "Dred Scott" as code for Roe v. Wade. Noah believed Bush was saying he would appoint Justices who opposed legal abortion.

== October 13: Third presidential debate (Arizona State University) ==
Third presidential debate
- Date(s): October 13, 2004
- Duration: 90 minutes
- Venue: Arizona State University
- Location: Tempe, Arizona
- Participants: George W. Bush; John Kerry
- Footage: PBS
- Moderator(s): Bob Schieffer of CBS

=== Venue ===
The third and final presidential debate between President George W. Bush and Senator John Kerry took place on Wednesday, October 13, 2004, in the Grady Gammage Memorial Auditorium at Arizona State University in Tempe, Arizona.

The debate was moderated by Bob Schieffer of CBS, who posed 20 total questions to the candidates.

== Third-party candidate debates ==
- January 29 — Former Green Party presidential nomination candidate and independent vice-presidential candidate Peter Camejo debated Normon Solomon at the Crest Theatre in downtown Sacramento, regarding what direction the Green Party should take in 2004. Camejo supported Ralph Nader, even as an independent candidate, and hoped that Nader could be persuaded to run with the Green Party. Solomon said that Nader should not run, and that the Greens should work to defeat George W. Bush. The debate was a benefit for listener-sponsored KVMR.
- August 31 — Michael Badnarik (Libertarian) and David Cobb (Green) debated in New York City. George W. Bush (Republican), John Kerry (Democrat), and Ralph Nader (independent) were invited to debate, but none of them accepted. The debate was moderated by Rob Richie, executive director of the Center for Voting and Democracy, and Walter Kane, a reporter for Channel 12 News. C-SPAN televised the debate on September 6.
- September 30 — Michael Badnarik (Libertarian) and David Cobb (Green) debated at 5 p.m. in Miami, across the street from the Bush-Kerry debate, which began at 9 p.m. Unlike Bush and Kerry, Badnarik and Cobb took unscripted questions from the audience and from correspondents. The event was carried live by Pacifica Radio, and broadcast later by PBS Television.
- October 6 — Michael Badnarik (Libertarian), Walt Brown (Socialist), David Cobb (Green), and Michael Peroutka (Constitution) debated at 8 p.m. at Cornell University in Ithaca, New York. The format of this event was similar to that of the September 30 debate: opening statements, questions from the audience, and closing statements. However, the debate was slightly shorter than the prior two third-party debates, at about 80 minutes total. Time was split between four candidates rather than two, and most of the questions came from Cornell undergraduate and graduate students.
- October 7 — Vice-Presidential debate conducted by Democracy Now! featuring Pat LaMarche (Green), Peter Camejo (Independent Ralph Nader's running mate), and Richard Campagna (Libertarian).
- October 7 — Michael Badnarik (Libertarian) and David Cobb (Green) at the University of Texas at Austin at 11:30 a.m.
- October 15 — Walt Brown (Socialist), David Cobb (Green), Charles Jay (Personal Choice Party), Gary Nolan (radio host) standing in for Michael Badnarik (Libertarian), former presidential candidate Deirdre Griswold standing in for John Parker (Workers World Party), former presidential candidate Jerry White standing in for Bill Van Auken (Socialist Equality Party) at East Tennessee State University. The debate was released on DVD.

== See also ==
- George W. Bush 2004 presidential campaign
- John Kerry 2004 presidential campaign
- 2004 United States presidential election
