= John Kerry 2004 presidential campaign =

American political campaign

John Kerry for President 2004
- Campaign: 2004 Democratic primaries 2004 U.S. presidential election
- Candidate: John Kerry; U.S. Senator from Massachusetts (1985–2013); John Edwards; U.S. Senator from North Carolina (1999–2005)
- Affiliation: Democratic Party
- Status: Announced: September 2, 2003; Presumptive nominee: March 2, 2004; Official nominee: July 29, 2004; Election day: November 2, 2004; Projected defeat: November 3, 2004
- Headquarters: Boston, Massachusetts
- Key people: Mary Beth Cahill (Manager); Bob Shrum (Consultant)
- Slogan(s): A Stronger America; Let America Be America Again; Stronger at Home, Respected in the World

Website
- www.johnkerry.com (original site via the Internet Archive.)

The 2004 presidential campaign of John Kerry, the longtime U.S. senator from Massachusetts, began when he formed an exploratory committee on December 1, 2002. On September 2, 2003, he formally announced his candidacy for the Democratic nomination. After beating John Edwards, Howard Dean, Wesley Clark, and other candidates in the primaries, he became the Democratic nominee, challenging Republican incumbent George W. Bush in the general election. Kerry selected Edwards as his running mate.

Kerry conceded defeat in a telephone call to Bush at around 11 a.m. EST (16:00 UTC) on the morning of November 3, 2004. Had Kerry won, he would have been the first incumbent senator since John F. Kennedy to be elected president and the second Catholic president after Kennedy; the latter feat would be eventually accomplished 16 years later by Joe Biden. Edwards would have been the first vice president from North Carolina. Kerry also would have been the first president born in Colorado and the fifth president from Massachusetts. Kerry was the most recent Democratic presidential nominee to lose both the electoral vote and the popular vote until Kamala Harris in 2024 against Republican nominee Donald Trump.

Edwards would run for president again in the 2008 Democratic primary, finishing third. That year's Democratic nominee, Barack Obama, became the third sitting senator elected president after Warren G. Harding and Kennedy. Kerry would win for another term as a senator from Massachusetts in 2008 until he was nominated by Obama following his reelection in 2012 as Secretary of State.

== Political positions ==
=== Economy and budget ===
Kerry supported enhancing the Balanced Budget Act. In 1993, Kerry voted for the North American Free Trade Agreement (NAFTA). Kerry supported eliminating tax incentives for companies that move operations overseas and making efforts to reduce outsourcing.

Kerry was against funding cuts in Social Security benefits. He opposed privatizing Social Security accounts.

=== Immigration ===
Kerry supported cutting the Bureau for Citizenship and Immigration Services' application pending backlog and reducing the lag for the naturalization process. Kerry endorsed benefits to legal immigrants. Kerry supported the DREAM Act. Kerry supported the proposal of legalizing the status of illegal immigrants, pending a certain amount of working time in the US and passing a background check. Kerry proposed border enforcement reformation and an increase of border enforcement funding.

=== Education and science ===
Kerry voted for the No Child Left Behind Act and argues that it should be "fully funded" which would entail funding several programs up to authorized levels of funding. He proposed a new "Education Trust Fund" to require the federal government to fund programs up to their authorized levels. He also proposed a "College Opportunity Tax Credit" for "economically vulnerable" students.

Kerry promised to increase funding for scientific research, to reduce restrictions on stem cell research, and to facilitate cooperation with foreign scientists by improving immigration and visa practices. He said he would support efforts to reduce global warming.

=== Law and justice ===
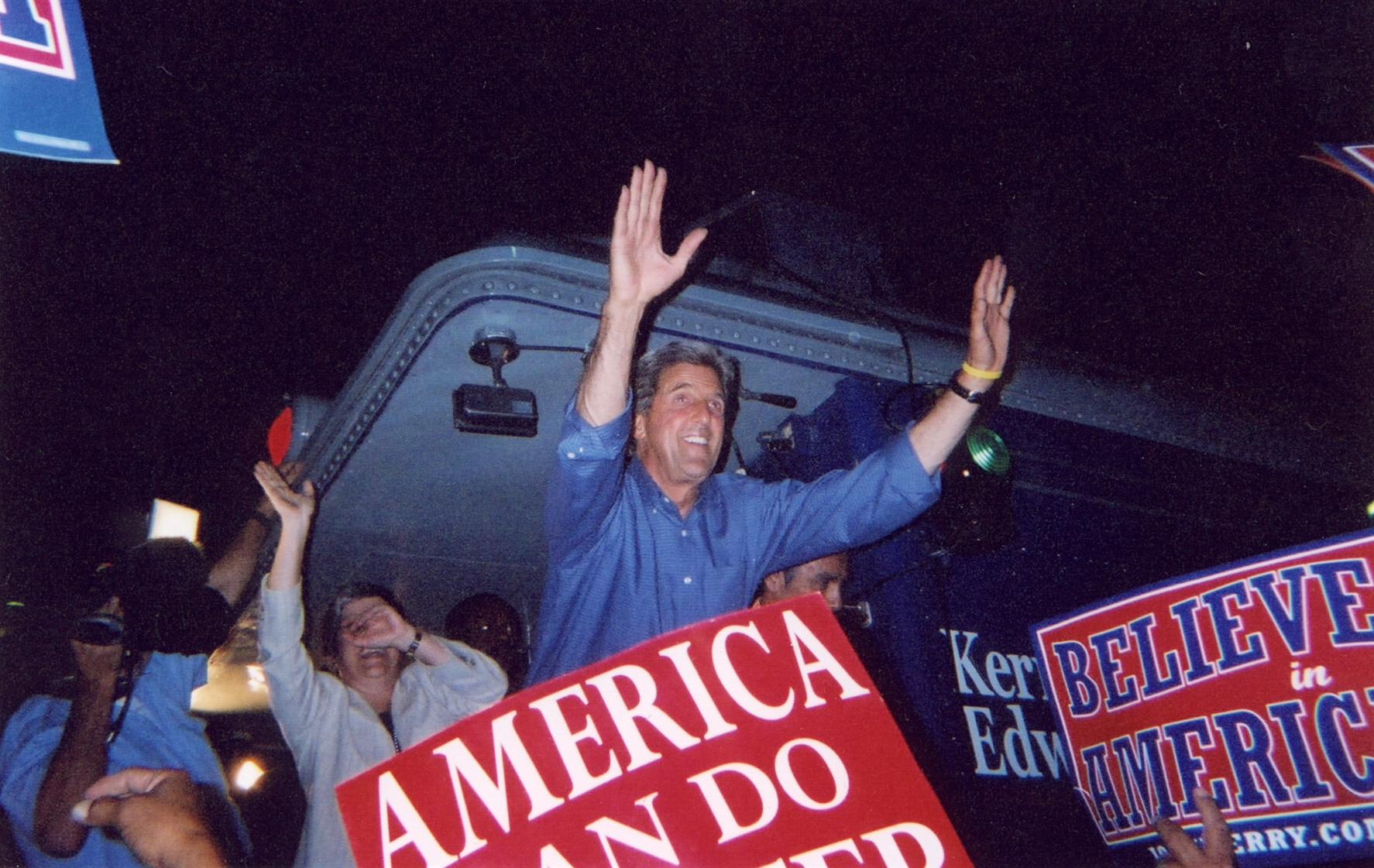
John Kerry on Caboose during a Whistle Stop at La Posada Hotel, Winslow, Arizona 2004

As an assistant district attorney, Kerry personally prosecuted armed robbers, rapists, and mob bosses. He is in favor of putting resources in the community, backing the Community Oriented Policing System Act (COPS), and creating laws that lead to criminals being arrested and convicted. Kerry has advocated expanding the COPS program to place 100,000 police officers in community policing assignments. Kerry supports the Police Corps program. In the Senate, Kerry has advocated laws that punish drug dealers and money launderers.

==== Death penalty ====
Kerry has long stated his opposition to the death penalty, but stated that he would support it in the case of convicted terrorists. He had previously opposed the death penalty for terrorists on the grounds that it would make it difficult to extradite suspects to the United States to stand trial. (Many nations refuse extradition requests, on humanitarian grounds, if the suspect faces execution.)

==== Illegal drugs ====
Kerry's proposals to deal with illegal drugs included focusing on keeping drugs out of the country as well as reducing demand for illegal drugs. Kerry supported aggressively targeting traffickers and dealers. Kerry supported funding drug prevention and treatment programs.

==== Guns ====
Kerry is a gun owner and hunter. Kerry believes that law-abiding Americans should continue to have the right to own guns, but only guns that fall within the "hunters and sportsmen" paradigm. As he has voted in favour of various gun control measures, the NRA Political Victory Fund gave him an F rating in 2004, their lowest rating. In 2002, the pro-gun control Brady Campaign to Prevent Gun Violence indicated that Kerry voted their preferred position 100% of the time.

As a senator, Kerry has supported:

- The Brady Bill and mandatory background checks
- Legislation to close the gun show loophole
- A ban on various types of semi-automatic firearms
- Mandatory gun locks

=== Social issues ===
==== Abortion ====
Kerry affiliates himself with pro-choice women's organizations. Kerry is against the criminalization of abortion. In the Senate, Kerry consistently voted against bans on abortions conducted on military bases and military installations overseas, as well as against the ban on partial-birth abortion. He has been given a 0% rating from the National Right to Life Committee and a 100% rating from NARAL.

In an interview on July 4, 2004, Kerry told the Dubuque, Iowa, Telegraph Herald "I oppose abortion, personally. I don't like abortion. I believe life does begin at conception." "I can't take my Catholic belief, my article of faith, and legislate it on a Protestant or a Jew or an atheist," he continued in the interview. "We have separation of church and state in the United States of America." Archbishop Raymond Burke said that he would deny Kerry communion over his position on abortion. The issue led to comparisons between Kerry's presidential campaign and that of John F. Kennedy in 1960. While Kennedy had to demonstrate his independence from the Roman Catholic Church due to public fear that a Catholic president would make decisions based on Vatican commands, it seemed that Kerry, in contrast, had to show obedience to Catholic authorities in order to win votes. According to Margaret Ross Sammons, Kerry's campaign was sufficiently damaged by the threat to withhold communion that it may have cost him the election. Sammons argues that President George W. Bush was able to win 53% of the Catholic vote because he appealed to "traditional" Catholics.

==== Gay rights ====
Kerry is in favor of the acknowledgement and protection of civil rights for gay and lesbian Americans. John Kerry is an original cosponsor of the Hate Crimes Prevention bill and supports passage of the Employment Non-Discrimination Act. He introduced a very early bill (1985) into the Senate to statutorily forbid sexual-orientation-based discrimination. Kerry cosponsored the Ryan White Comprehensive AIDS Resources Emergency Act (CARE) and also sponsored the Vaccines for the New Millennium Act.

Kerry supported same-sex civil unions, but opposed same-sex marriage. Kerry supported legislation to provide domestic partners of federal employees the benefits available to spouses of federal employees. Kerry voted against the Defense of Marriage Act (DOMA) in the Senate in 1996 and opposes the proposed Federal Marriage Amendment (FMA). He and Senator Edwards were absent for the unsuccessful vote to invoke cloture on the FMA, a procedural move that the FMA's proponents had conceded beforehand would be defeated. In an interview with National Public Radio in February 2004, Kerry endorsed equal rights for same-sex couples, but commented that "the word marriage kind of gets in the way of the whole debate," because of the religious origin of marriage as being limited to male-female unions.

Kerry opposed the "don't ask, don't tell" policy. Since 1995, Human Rights Campaign, the nation's largest gay-rights advocacy group, has given Kerry a 100% rating for his voting record in Congress.

==== Affirmative action ====
Kerry states that he supports affirmative action and diversity programs, a claim supported by his Senate voting record. He has, however, expressed reservations about affirmative action in the past, most notably in a 1992 speech in which he reportedly called the practice "inherently limited and divisive," explaining that it "has kept America thinking in racial terms." Kerry has also received some criticism from African Americans because his campaign inner circle was entirely white. Kerry also remarked on Bill Clinton's close relationship with African Americans: "President Clinton was often known as the first black president. I wouldn't be upset if I could earn the right to be the second." Kerry's remark was not well received by some blacks.

==== National service ====
Kerry supports supplementing national service in nearly all aspects of American life, including requiring community service for high school students to graduate, a "Summer of Service" for teenagers (essentially community service during summer breaks from school, with a U.S. $500 grant for college), increasing the Peace Corps to 25,000 members, requiring universities that receive Federal funding to offer a ROTC, and providing more funding for ROTC scholarships.

=== Foreign policy ===
==== Iraq ====
Kerry voted in support of the Senate resolution authorizing the President to use force against Saddam Hussein if he failed to surrender his weapons of mass destruction and related tools for constructing and distributing them. Kerry, in October 2002, declared his belief that "Iraq has some lethal and incapacitating agents and is capable of quickly producing weaponizing of a variety of such agents, including anthrax, for delivery on a range of vehicles, such as bombs, missiles, aerial sprayers and covert operatives which would bring them to the United States itself." The National Intelligence Estimate, to which Kerry had access, held some skepticism of Iraq's capability. Kerry's vote to support the use of force in Iraq was given with strong stipulations that all other peaceful avenues be exhausted first, and that any action of force would be done in conjunction with a world coalition, and not just with the British. (Kerry's full statement before casting his resolution vote)

After the President launched the U.S. invasion against Iraq, without meeting all of Kerry's stipulation, Kerry reiterated his position and declared the administration's Iraq policy reckless at best and baseless at worst. He has since been outspoken against the handling of the war and of the Bush administration's stewardship of occupied Iraq, attacking what he calls poor planning and poor diplomacy on Bush's part, but supports remaining in Iraq until the task of reconstruction and reconciliation is complete. He changed his position on WMDs by saying they were not enough to go to war with Iraq. (Kerry's post-attack view on Iraq) This harmed Kerry's campaign when he was perceived as a "flip-flopper," changing his position to better suit what is popular. This perception was strengthened after a March 16, 2004, debate at Marshall University in Huntington, West Virginia when Kerry made what would become one of the most famous lines of his campaign stating, "I actually did vote for the 87 billion dollars, before I voted against it." The Bush campaign immediately seized on the comment, using the footage in television ads to illustrate its charge that Kerry flip-flops on issues, particularly the war in Iraq. "Kerry Discusses $87 Billion Comment,"

Kerry was criticized by Howard Dean and others for his position on the war, which was criticized as inconsistent. Kerry explained his vote authorizing force by claiming that he believed the Senate resolution was intended to be a diplomatic "threat" to Saddam Hussein and not a blank check for war. In the first of the 2004 United States presidential debates, Kerry argued that Saddam Hussein had posed a significant potential threat, but that President Bush was premature in going to war. Kerry stated that war should have been a last resort, after diplomatic pressure and efforts by United Nations weapons inspectors had been allowed to run their course.

Kerry and Bush sparred repeatedly over Kerry's expression of his policy. Kerry maintained that he has "one Iraq policy", while Bush claimed that Kerry has made major changes in his policy. The Bush campaign says that differences between one Kerry policy statement and another amount to "flip-flops." The nonpartisan FactCheck stated that "Kerry has never wavered from his support for giving Bush authority to use force in Iraq, nor has he changed his position that he, as President, would not have gone to war without greater international support."

==== Multilateralism ====
Kerry advocates involving NATO, troops from other countries and the United Nations in U.S.-led efforts to achieve the goals of a "stable" and "democratic" world. According to the Harvard Crimson, Kerry said in 1970 that the United Nations should have approval over most of our foreign military operations. "I'm an internationalist. I'd like to see our troops dispersed through the world only at the directive of the United Nations." He has since repudiated this 1970 position. Kerry says he has always believed the United States has the absolute right to defend itself.

Throughout his Senate career, Kerry was also a staunch critic of many foreign policy initiatives of Republican Presidents. He opposed and voted against the Gulf War in 1991, and opposed funding the Contras in Nicaragua and similar armed groups in Latin America.

Kerry was preferred by most US allies, according to a GlobeScan-PIPA poll, conducted during July and August 2004.

=== Military ===
Kerry sponsored the Code of Conduct of Arms Transfers Act, which would prohibit U.S. military assistance and arms transfers to undemocratic nations, human rights violators or armed aggressors. Kerry cosponsored an amendment to the Department of Defense Authorization Bill that allows the military to transport families of soldiers wounded while on active duty.

Kerry detailed proposals for homeland security efforts include enlisting the National Guard and AmeriCorps, creating a community defense service, ensuring first defenders and first responders are equipped and ready, improving information technology, reforming domestic intelligence, implementing public health initiatives and improving infrastructure security.

Kerry and fellow Vietnam-era Navy veteran Senator John McCain (R-AZ) had worked together in the early 1990s on U.S. Senate Select POW/MIA Committee. McCain and Kerry later joined to urge President Clinton to lift the trade embargo against Vietnam, which led to normalized relations between the countries but engendered some angry reactions from those involved in the Vietnam War POW/MIA issue.

=== Environment ===
Kerry advocates the removal of toxins from communities, bolstering the Superfund cleanup program, and reducing sprawl and traffic congestion.

Proposals for "Green and Clean Communities" include a Toxics Task Force at the EPA, fighting air pollution, water pollution and fighting other environmental hazards. Kerry has proposed a "Conservation Covenant." As part of the covenant, Kerry will extend the Endangered Species Act for the benefits of wildlife and habitat protection to public and private lands and reinvest public-land royalties back into land protection.

In 2002, Kerry was one of the leaders of the Senate filibuster that defeated the Bush administration's proposal to open the Arctic National Wildlife Refuge to oil drilling. Kerry wants to participate in the development of an international climate change strategy to address global warming.

In 1998, the League of Conservation Voters gave Kerry an award for having one of the best environmental voting records in the Senate over the previous five years. In 2004, the Sierra Club endorsed Kerry, the first time it had endorsed a presidential candidate before the party conventions.

=== Health care ===
Kerry proposed a comprehensive health care plan that was more extensive than that proposed by President Bush. Several estimates were made of the cost of his proposals. While the estimates varied, they all indicated that the funding requirements would be substantial.

== Campaign history ==
=== Campaign managers ===
Early on, John Kerry's campaign manager was Jim Jordan. However, Jordan was replaced by Mary Beth Cahill. Kerry also hired Bob Shrum as a campaign consultant. Cahill and Shrum were known for disagreeing on how the campaign should be run.

Kerry's team of advisors included Robert Rubin on economic affairs and Gary Hart on foreign policy. James Johnson, a Washington businessman and democratic veteran, coordinated Kerry's search for a running mate, eventually settling on John Edwards.

=== Endorsements ===
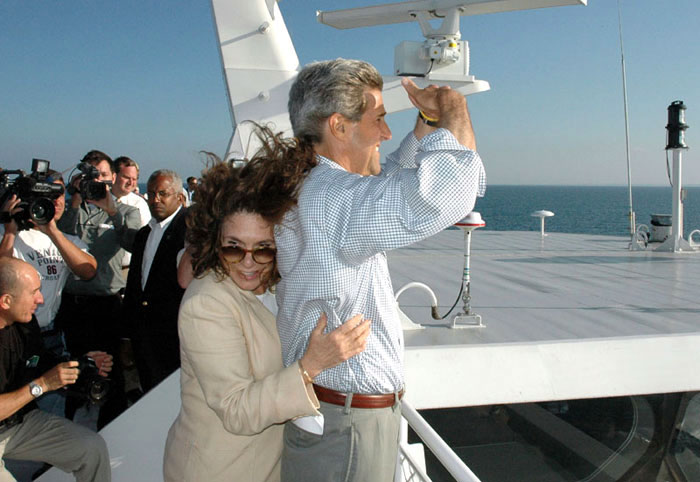
Kerry and Teresa Heinz crossing Lake Michigan on the Lake Express ferry during the 2004 campaign

List of John Kerry 2004 presidential campaign endorsements

Government Officials

- Edward D. Baca Chief of the National Guard Bureau (1994–1998) (Independent)
- Henry Cisneros United States Secretary of Housing and Urban Development (1993–1997)
- Wesley Clark Supreme Allied Commander Europe (1997–2000)
- Daniel W. Christman Superintendent of the United States Military Academy (1996–2001) (Independent)
- William J. Crowe Chairman of the Joint Chiefs of Staff (1985–1989) (Republican)
- John Eisenhower United States Ambassador to Belgium (1969–1971) (Republican)
- Joseph P. Hoar Commander in Chief of United States Central Command (1991–1994)
- Claudia J. Kennedy three-star general in the United States Army (1969–2000)
- Merrill McPeak United States Secretary of the Air Force (1993) (Independent)
- Clyde V. Prestowitz Jr. counselor to the Secretary of Commerce (1981–1986) (Republican)
- Robert Reich United States Secretary of Labor (1993–1997)
- John Shalikashvili Chairman of the Joint Chiefs of Staff (1993–1997)
- Russell E. Train Administrator of the Environmental Protection Agency (1973–1977) (Republican)
- Stansfield Turner Director of Central Intelligence (1977–1981)
- Johnnie E. Wilson four-star general in the United States Army (1961–1999) (Independent)

Senators

- Hillary Clinton U.S. Senator from New York (2001–2009)
- Dianne Feinstein U.S. Senator from California (1992–2023)
- Ted Kennedy U.S. Senator from Massachusetts (1962–2009)

Former Senators

- Max Cleland U.S. Senator from Georgia (1997–2003)
- Marlow Cook U.S. Senator from Kentucky (1968–1974) (Republican)
- David Durenberger U.S. Senator from Minnesota (1978–1995) (Republican)
- Gary Hart U.S. Senator from Colorado
- Bob Smith U.S. Senator from New Hampshire (1990–2003) (Republican)

Representatives

- Jim Clyburn U.S. Representative from SC-6 (1993–present)
- Dick Gephardt U.S. Representative from MO-3 (1977–2005)

Former Representatives

- Paul Findley U.S. Representative from IL-20 (Republican)
- Pete McCloskey U.S. Representative from CA-11 (1967–1973), from CA-17 (1973–1975), from CA-12 (1975–1983) (Republican)

Governors

- Kathleen Sebelius Governor of Kansas (2003–2009)

Former Governors

- Elmer L. Andersen Governor of Minnesota (1961–1963) (Republican)
- Angus King Governor of Maine (1995–2003) (Independent)
- William Milliken Governor of Michigan (1969–1983) (Republican)
- Jeanne Shaheen Governor of New Hampshire (1997–2003)
- Jesse Ventura Governor of Minnesota (1999–2003) (Independent)

Former State Officials

- H. Clay Myers Jr. Oregon State Treasurer (1977–1984) (Republican)
- Bill Rutherford Oregon State Treasurer (1984–1987) (Republican)

State Legislatures

- Barack Obama member of the Illinois Senate (1997–2004)

Former State Legislatures

- John Galbraith member of the Ohio House of Representatives from the 48th district (1967–1986) (Republican)
- Al Meiklejohn member of the Colorado Senate from the 19th district (1977–1997) (Republican)

Local Officials

- David Catania at-large member of the Council of the District of Columbia (Independent)
- Antonio Villaraigosa member of the Los Angeles City Council from the 14th district (2003–2005)

International Politicians

- Simon Burns Member of Parliament (1987–2017) (Conservative Party)
- Alan Duncan Member of Parliament (1992–2019) (Conservative Party)
- Andrew MacKinlay Member of Parliament (1992–2010) (Labour Party)
- Richard Ottaway Member of Parliament (Conservative Party) (1992–2015) (Conservative Party)
- Malcolm Rifkind former Member of Parliament (1974–1997) (Conservative Party)

Academics

- David Greenberg Professor of US History at Rutgers University
- Camille Paglia Professor of Humanities and Media Studies at University of the Arts
- Steven Pinker Johnstone Family Professor of Psychology at Harvard University

Public Figures

- John Perry Barlow former Grateful Dead songwriter
- Gerald Shargel defense attorney
- Mark Alan Stamaty cartoonist
- Michael Steinberger wine critic

Businessmen

- John C. Bogle The Vanguard Group founder (Republican)
- Lee Iacocca former CEO of Chrysler (Republican)

Media

- Doug Bandow Senior Fellow at the Cato Institute (Republican)
- Paul Berman Slate contributor
- Henry Blodget Business Insider co-founder
- Stewart Brand co-founder of Whole Earth Catalog
- Steve Chapman Chicago Tribune columnist (Republican)
- Daniel W. Drezner Slate contributor (Republican)
- Mike Godwin contributing editor of Reason magazine
- Fred Kaplan Slate contributor
- Jon Katz Slate contributor
- Mickey Kaus Slate contributor
- Laura Kipnis Slate contributor
- Josh Levin national editor of Slate
- Dahlia Lithwick senior editor of Slate
- Scott McConnell co-founder of The American Conservative (Republican)
- Timothy Noah Slate contributor
- David Plotz deputy editor of Slate
- Charley Reese former Orlando Sentinel columnist (Republican)
- John Rennie Editor in Chief of Scientific American
- William Saletan Slate contributor (Republican)
- Julian Sanchez assistant editor of Reason magazine
- Michael Shermer publisher of Skeptic magazine (Libertarian)
- Andrew Sullivan former editor of The New Republic (Republican)
- Jude Wanniski economist (Republican)
- Matt Welch contributing editor of Reason magazine (Independent)

Actors

- Billy Crystal
- Uma Thurman

Musicians

- Jon Bon Jovi
- Jackson Browne
- The Dixie Chicks
- Neil Diamond
- John Fogerty
- Carole King
- John Mellencamp
- Pearl Jam
- Bonnie Raitt
- R.E.M.
- Bruce Springsteen and his E Street Band
- Barbra Streisand

In sheer numbers, however, Kerry had fewer endorsements than Howard Dean, who was far ahead in the superdelegate race going into the Iowa caucuses in February 2004, although Kerry led the endorsement race in Iowa, New Hampshire, Arizona, South Carolina, New Mexico and Nevada. Kerry's main perceived weakness was in his neighboring state of New Hampshire and nearly all national polls. Most other states did not have updated polling numbers to give an accurate placing for the Kerry campaign before Iowa.

Heading into the primaries, Kerry's campaign was largely seen as in trouble; the key factor enabling it to survive was Kerry's mortgaging his own home and lending the money to his campaign. He also brought on the "magical" Michael Whouley who was Al Gore's national field director and would later become the Democratic National Committee's National Field Director for Kerry-Edwards. Whouley is widely credited with helping bring home the Iowa victory the same as he did in New Hampshire for Al Gore in 2000 against Bill Bradley.

The only notable labor union to endorse him early was the International Association of Fire Fighters; however, Kerry's support quickly snowballed as he won caucuses and primaries. He received a historic endorsement by the United Farm Workers on February 1, 2004, in Phoenix, Arizona. This was the first time the UFW had endorsed a candidate in the primary since Robert Kennedy. He received the endorsement of the League of Conservation Voters prior to the New Hampshire primary, a first for that organization as well.

He also received the support of each of his former competitors as they lost primaries and dropped out of the race, beginning with Missouri representative Dick Gephardt. Plenty of other notable Democrats followed, as did many labor unions which had previously backed Gephardt or Dean or stayed out of the race entirely (he won the endorsement of the entire AFL–CIO just prior to his Super Tuesday showdown with Edwards).

Becoming the nominee, he gained the support of virtually every Democratic politician and organization in the nation. Two notable exceptions were retiring Georgia Senator Zell Miller, a conservative Democrat, and Ed Koch, the former three-term mayor of New York City, both of whom endorsed George W. Bush. All of the former candidates for the nomination endorsed Kerry.

On September 29, John Eisenhower, the son of the former Republican president Dwight D. Eisenhower, endorsed Kerry in the New Hampshire Union Leader newspaper, saying that the Republican Party of today "is one with which I am totally unfamiliar". Ron Reagan, son of former President Ronald Reagan, endorsed Kerry, saying that Bush had hijacked his father's real legacy for extremist purposes, and spoke at the Democratic National Convention. Ron Reagan Jr. had a history of opposing his father's policies while President Reagan was in office. Furthermore, Michael Reagan, President Reagan's son from his first marriage, endorsed President Bush. The Senator also gained the endorsement of Marlow Cook, the former Republican Senator from Kentucky.

Ralph Nader's running mate in the 1996 and 2000 elections, Native American activist Winona LaDuke, refused to support him in 2004. Instead, she stated: "I am voting for John Kerry this November. I love this land, and I know that we need to make drastic changes in Washington if we are going to protect our land and our communities."

Former Governors of Maine and Minnesota Angus King and Jesse Ventura, respectively, endorsed Kerry in October 2004. Kerry also gained support from political activist Lyndon LaRouche.

=== Campaign controversies ===
==== Ted Sampley ====
In 2004, Vietnam veteran Ted Sampley claimed Kerry gave him the finger in front of photographers at the Vietnam memorial. Rush Limbaugh, in conjunction with his broadcast on the matter, posted a doctored photo of the incident on his website, but stated that the Newsmax report that made the claim was his only source.

==== Swift Boat Veterans for Truth ====
Early in the 2004 presidential election campaign an organization known as Swift Boat Veterans for Truth was established to challenge John Kerry's bid for the presidency.

The group, led by Vietnam veteran John O'Neill, claimed that Kerry was "unfit to serve," based on various cited anecdotes regarding his wartime conduct, but also focused on his past activism in the anti-Vietnam war movement. While Kerry had criticized the government's highly unpopular war policy, the SBVT group claimed that his criticism was a "betrayal of trust" with other soldiers, and that by his activism he had caused direct and inexcusable "harm" to soldiers still at war. (See John Kerry military service controversy.)

Many believe that the organization's accusations coupled with the Kerry campaign's slow reaction to them were a significant factor in Kerry's November defeat. In addition, Kerry's first line from his acceptance speech at the 2004 Democratic National Convention was, "I'm John Kerry, and I'm reporting for duty." Critics have argued that this line was inept and that Kerry's emphasis on his Vietnam experience opened the door to the Swiftboat attacks and shifted the national debate towards foreign policy issues, which were Bush's strengths, rather than the economic issues on which Democrats could have had more campaign success.

=== Running mate selection ===
Kerry's campaign began the process of searching for a vice-presidential nominee, sometimes called the "Veepstakes", shortly after Kerry's Super Tuesday victories. Kerry named Jim Johnson, former advisor to Vice President Walter F. "Fritz" Mondale, as the head of a vice-presidential search process.

One of the major criteria considered to be a factor in selecting a vice-presidential candidate was the ability to deliver a traditionally Republican or a swing state in the November election. Every successful Democratic presidential campaign since 1960 had included a politician from a swing state (usually in the South) who helped deliver one or more states for the Democrats.

By the first week of July 2004, pundits and those close to the Kerry campaign indicated that the vice-presidential selection had narrowed to five potential choices: U.S. Sen. John R. Edwards (N.C.), Ret. General Wesley K. Clark (Ar.), U.S. Rep. Richard A. "Dick" Gephardt (Mo.), U.S. Sen. Bob Graham (Fl.), and Iowa Gov. Thomas J. Vilsack, all of whom were reportedly instructed to clear their calendars for a potential announcement during the second week of July. Edwards, from North Carolina, Graham, from Florida, and Clark from Arkansas all were Southerners; the other two, from Missouri and Iowa respectively, are Midwesterners (the Midwest is viewed as a key region containing numerous swing states). As of late June, the charismatic Edwards was the first choice of Democratic voters, according to several polls; some pundits attributed this to high name recognition, due to his runner-up status in the primaries.

On the morning of July 6, 2004, Kerry announced the selection of John Edwards as his running mate. However, at 10 p.m. on the night before the official announcement, the information was leaked by an airport worker who saw Edwards's name being painted on Kerry's plane, which was to be used to announce his choice of running mate. On July 6, the Kerry campaign sent an e-mail message to his supporters at about 8:15 a.m. EDT informing them of the choice, and made the formal announcement for 9 a.m. EDT in Pittsburgh, Pennsylvania.

Kerry and Edwards were previously considered as potential running mates for Democratic presidential nominee Al Gore in the 2000 election, however Gore later chose Senator Joe Lieberman from Connecticut for the ticket.

=== Democratic Convention ===
At the Democratic National Convention in Boston from July 26 to 29, 2004, Kerry made his Vietnam War experience a prominent theme. In accepting the nomination, he began his speech with, "I'm John Kerry and I'm reporting for duty."

Following his official nomination at the convention, Kerry received only a small bounce in the polls and remained effectively tied with his opponent, Bush. This was the first time in recent political history that a candidate failed to receive a substantial boost in post-convention poll numbers. Some political pundits attributed this small boost to the unusually small number of undecided voters as compared with previous presidential elections.

=== Debates ===
On March 13, while at a speaking engagement in Quincy, Illinois site of one of the historic Lincoln-Douglas debates, Kerry challenged Bush to a series of monthly debates. The Bush campaign declined the challenge.

On September 20, the Bush campaign and the Kerry campaign jointly released a memorandum of understanding between the two campaigns. The 32-page MOU covered in minute detail many aspects of the staging and format for the presidential and vice-presidential debates.

On September 30, Kerry and Bush debated at University of Miami in Coral Gables, Florida in the first of three scheduled debates. This debate focused on foreign policy issues. Polls conducted immediately following the debate suggests that a majority of undecided voters believe that Kerry fared better than Bush did.

On October 8, Kerry and Bush debated at Washington University in St. Louis in a town-hall style debate, with the questions asked by the audience of undecided voters. Polls were split as to who won this debate, as Bush's performance was greatly improved.

On October 13, Kerry and Bush debated at Arizona State University in Tempe, Arizona. The focus of this debate was domestic policy issues. Again, polls were split, but more indicated a win for Kerry than Bush.

Additionally, on October 5, the vice presidential candidates Senator John Edwards and Vice President Dick Cheney engaged in a debate at Case Western Reserve University in Cleveland, Ohio.

==== Campaign spending ====
Kerry took public funds to finance his campaign, agreeing to a $74.6 million limit.

== Views of Kerry ==
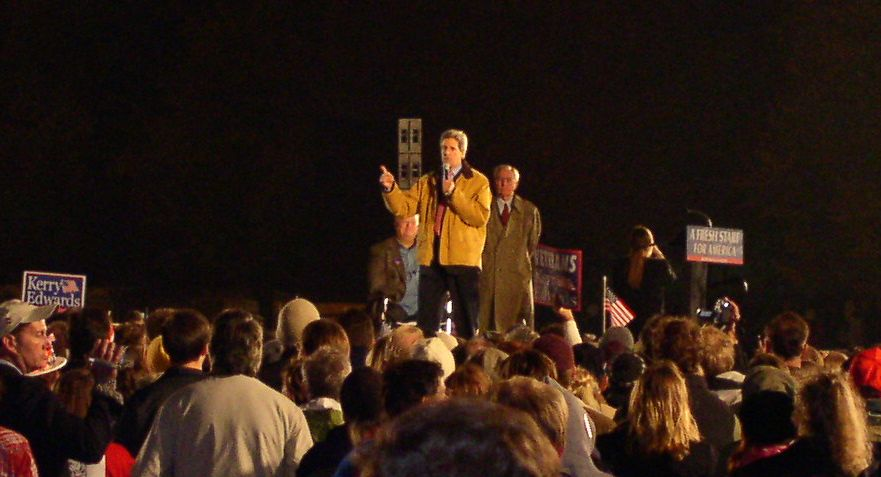
John Kerry, Walter Mondale and Max Cleland in Minneapolis, October 21, 2004

Some of Kerry's popular support came from "Anybody but Bush" voters - those who voted for him as a repudiation of the Bush administration's policies. One of the major focuses of his campaign was to attract voters to his stances on the issues, instead of as a de facto opponent of the President.

The official Kerry for President website declares:

John has a bold, new vision for America. An America safe from foreign threats and greedy special interests. John has the experience and plans to lead America to better jobs, quality health care, energy that is clean, renewable, and independent, and greater opportunities for our children.

The Kansas City Star endorsed Kerry before the Missouri primary and wrote of him:

Kerry has the right combination of intelligence, experience and thoughtful, progressive views for the job. His military record—he received both a Bronze Star and a Silver Star for acts of bravery in Vietnam—as well as his defense and foreign policy expertise clearly make him the best qualified Democrat to lead the nation in the continuing fight against our adversaries abroad...Kerry has decades of public service that are available for scrutiny and review. It is an excellent record, one that contains abundant evidence of the senator's commitment to the country and its better impulses.

The Chattanooga Times Free Press endorsed Kerry before the Tennessee Democratic primary and editorialized:

If Mr. Kerry is, by contrast [to Mr. Bush], a 'liberal,' at least his policies make sense and would benefit all Americans. He has supported the sort of responsible domestic policies that boost education, support job creation and improve health care for all. With his personal war experience and deep background in foreign policy, he would exercise sound diplomacy in foreign affairs.

The Washington Post had this editorial comment on Kerry's approaching front-runner status:

JOHN KERRY has become the favorite for the Democratic presidential nomination without a detailed or clarifying debate on many issues.... Now, with the nomination seemingly within his reach, the Massachusetts senator must begin to more fully explain where he stands on the major challenges facing the country. That task is particularly important for Mr. Kerry because of his fuzziness on issues ranging from Iraq to gay marriage. ... But even a more independent assessment of Mr. Kerry can lead to puzzlement. He says he opposes gay marriage, yet voted against the federal Defense of Marriage act. He voted for the North American Free Trade agreement yet now talks in protectionist terms.

In an appearance in Milwaukee, fellow candidate and political rival Howard Dean stated, "When you act like Senator Kerry does, he appears to be more like George Bush than he does like a Democrat."

Critics of Kerry cite Associated Press reports that Kerry made efforts to keep loopholes for special interests. One loophole allowed American International Group to profit from liability insurance coverage it provided for the "Big Dig" project in Boston. AIG later provided the funds for Kerry's trip to Vermont and donated $30,000 (or more) to a group used to set up Kerry's presidential campaign (Company executives also donated $18,000 to his campaigns). Charles Lewis, head of the Center for Public Integrity, stated that "the idea that Kerry has not helped or benefited from a specific special interest, which he has said, is utterly absurd." Kerry has denied any connection between his assistance to AIG and its contributions to his campaign.

Kerry was in favor of free markets, free trade, and fiscal prudence. The Americans for Democratic Action, a prominent liberal organization, rates Kerry's voting record better than that of Senator Edward Kennedy (D-MA), causing Republican National Committee chairman Ed Gillespie to joke, "Who would have guessed it? Ted Kennedy is the conservative senator from Massachusetts." (Kerry got a 93% from the ADA, Kennedy an 88%.)

On June 21, 2004, 48 Nobel laureates endorsed Kerry as they thought that he would increase the prosperity, health, environment, and security of Americans, attract talented scientists and engineers from abroad; and nurture a business environment that creates quality jobs. They criticized the Bush administration for reducing funding for scientific research, setting restrictions on stem cell research, ignoring scientific consensus on critical issues such as global warming, and hampering cooperation with foreign scientists by employing deterring immigration and visa practices.

A poll conducted in July and August 2004 showed that of citizens of 35 countries, 30 preferred Kerry over Bush. Only Nigeria, the Philippines and Poland preferred Bush. India and Thailand were divided. US Allies such as the UK (47% Kerry to 16% Bush), Germany (74% Kerry to 10% Bush), Spain (45% to 7%), Italy (58% to 14%), Japan (43% to 23%) were all in favor of Kerry. Other countries such as Mexico (38% to 18%), Colombia (47% to 26%), China (52% to 12%) and South-Africa (43% to 29%) were in favor of Kerry as well.

== Campaign slogans ==
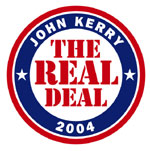
"The Real Deal"

Kerry's campaign used many slogans to describe his run for the presidency:

- "A stronger America begins at home."
- "A safer, stronger, more secure America."
- "The real deal" — often printed on circular campaign gear as shown on the right
- "The courage to do what's right for America"
- "Together, we can build a stronger America"
- "A lifetime of service and strength"
- "Let America be America again" — the title of a poem by Langston Hughes
- "A new team, for a new America"
- "Stronger at home, respected in the world"
- "America deserves better"
- "Let us make one America" — from Edwards' former presidential campaign
- "Hope is on the way!" — chanted by Edwards and his supporters during his speech at the 2004 Democratic National Convention
- "Help is on the way!" — chanted by Kerry and his supporters during his speech as the 2004 Democratic National Convention

== Transition planning ==
A presidential transition was contingently planned from Bush to Kerry. Prior to the election, Kerry and his senior advisors began discussing details for a potential presidential transition should he defeat President Bush, but the discussions were kept low-key. By late-October, it was reported by the Associated Press that aides to Kerry had anonymously told them that the transition process was behind schedule, but had still offered assurances that Kerry would be prepared to name his national security team soon after the election. With ongoing war, Kerry believed that it would be necessary to put such a team in place quickly during a transition after the election. On October 19, it was announced that Jim Johnson, who had led the search for Kerry's running mate, and David McKean would officially lead the transition effort.

== See also ==
- 2004 Democratic Party presidential primaries
- 2004 Democratic Party vice presidential candidate selection
- 2004 Democratic National Convention
- 2004 United States presidential election
- George W. Bush 2004 presidential campaign
