= Short list =

Narrowed list of candidates for some award or position

A short list or shortlist is a list of candidates for a job, prize, award, political position, etc., that has been reduced from a longer list of candidates (sometimes via intermediate lists known as "longlists"). The length of short lists varies according to the context. A candidate on a short list may or may not receive the award or position.

== Awards ==
For awards, short lists are often made public. These are the lists of candidates which will be considered, and from which winners will eventually be chosen. Sometimes a 'longlist' is prepared beforehand, from which the later short list will be selected. This may also be made public, such as with the Booker Prize.

== US politics ==
In US politics, the term is most frequently used in two instances: first a list of prospective vice presidential nominees compiled for the benefit of a party's presidential nominee, and a list of people who might be nominated by an executive office holder to a judicial or lower executive office.

In the latter instance, the short list may be compiled by the party election committee, after conducting research and undergoing a process of elimination, selecting individuals judged fit and capable of successfully completing any processes needed for acceptance. It may also be used for the presidential nominations of federal and Supreme Court justices.

In the former instance, its main use refers to the context of presidential nominees, as they make their choice for the vice presidential nominee. The list is typically compiled by the presidential nominee's advisers, with an eye to the characteristics of each vice presidential nominee that might boost the combined presidential ticket to victory. Under the current U.S. presidential and vice-presidential nomination regime, the presidential nominee's selection of running mate is authoritative, and will almost never be rejected by party convention delegates.

As a prospective vice presidential nominee is placed onto the short list they are typically subject to thorough vetting. The scrutiny involved in the vetting process usually increases as any given person whose name is on the short list comes closer to being chosen by the presidential nominee.

The media frequently claims to obtain and announces the names of individuals whom they believe to be on the short list. Presidential nominees' staffs may also quietly disclose the name of a candidate as being on the short list, in an attempt to gauge public opinion.

Typically, the most prominent individuals on the short list are those who competed well in the early presidential primary and caucus contests, but who are judged as non-threatening by the presidential nominee (for example, John Kerry's selection of John Edwards in 2004.) There are several individuals who are perennially listed as being on the short list, such as Evan Bayh and Bill Richardson for the Democrats, and Orrin Hatch for the Republicans. Although such public disclosure may be considered an honor or mark of distinction, it can also harm a political career if a candidate is frequently discussed but never chosen. (Note that this is somewhat analogous to, but distinct from, the also-ran status of the perennial candidate).

== See also ==
- All-women shortlist
- Papabile
- Veepstakes
