= George W. Bush 2004 presidential campaign =

American political campaign

George W. Bush for President 2004
- Bush-Cheney campaign logo.
- Campaign: 2004 Republican primaries 2004 U.S. presidential election
- Candidate: George W. Bush; 43rd President of the United States (2001–2009); Dick Cheney; 46th Vice President of the United States (2001–2009)
- Affiliation: Republican Party
- Status: Announced: May 16, 2003; Presumptive nominee: March 10, 2004; Official nominee: September 2, 2004; Election day: November 2, 2004; Projected victory: November 3, 2004; Certification: January 6, 2005; Inaugurated: January 20, 2005
- Headquarters: 1600 Pennsylvania Avenue; Washington D.C.
- Key people: Marc Racicot, Campaign Chairman and advisor to the President; Ken Mehlman, Campaign manager Karl Rove, Chief Political Strategist and Senior Advisor to the President; Terry Nelson, Political Director
- Receipts: US$196.0 million (2007-12-31)
- Slogan(s): A Safer World and a More Hopeful America; Steady Leadership in Times of Change

Website
- www.GeorgeWBush.com (Internet Archive version, November 2, 2004)

The 2004 presidential campaign of George W. Bush, the 43rd president of the United States, announced his candidacy for re-election as president on May 16, 2003. On September 2, 2004, he again became the nominee of the Republican Party for the 2004 presidential election. Along with his running mate, Vice President Dick Cheney, President George W. Bush was opposed in the general election by U.S. Senator John Kerry of Massachusetts and minor candidates from other parties. The election took place on Tuesday, November 2, 2004.

George W. Bush's campaign chairman was Marc Racicot. His chief political strategist was Karl Rove, who had the title Senior Advisor to the President. Mark McKinnon was the chief communications strategist. He was later joined in August 2004 by Karen Hughes, a former Bush advisor who returned after some time away. His campaign manager was Ken Mehlman.

This re-election campaign was the most expensive in American history and was financed mainly by large corporations and industrial interests that the Bush administration represented in government.

== 2004 primary campaign ==
President Bush formally filed with the FEC on May 16, 2003. As he was virtually unopposed, he did no campaigning during the primary season.

On March 10, 2004, Bush clinched the number of delegates require for the nomination, 1608 Delegates and 168 Super delegates.

== Vice Presidential choices ==
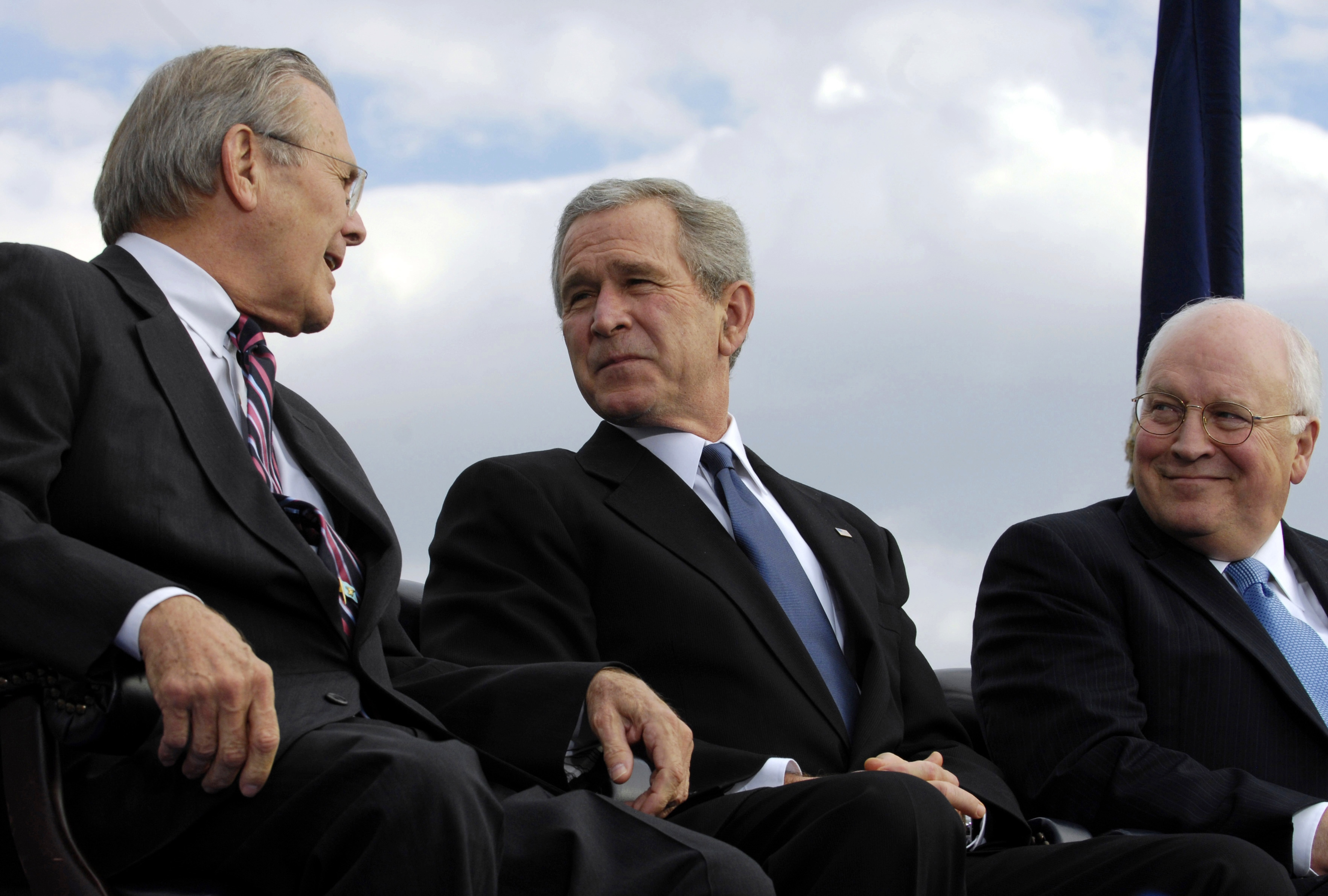
Cheney (far right) with former Defense Secretary Donald Rumsfeld (far left) and President Bush

In May 2003, Vice President Dick Cheney told reporters that "The president has asked me if I would serve again as his running mate. I've agreed to do that." In early 2004, with Bush expected to face a difficult re-election campaign, political commentators openly discussed the possibility that Cheney might be dropped from the ticket due to his "personal baggage". Such concern derived particularly from allegations that Cheney had lied about the rationale for the Iraq War, and that his former company Halliburton had profited inappropriately from that war. Some analysts even floated the idea that Cheney – who had previously suffered four heart attacks – might step down on his own for health reasons.

Among those viewed as strong contenders for his replacement were: Bill Frist, the Senate Majority Leader; Rudy Giuliani, the former Mayor of New York City; George Pataki, the Governor of New York; Rob Portman, congressman of Ohio; Bill Owens, the Governor of Colorado; and Tom Ridge, the Secretary of Homeland Security. In July, former Senator Al D'Amato, Republican of New York, publicly stated that Bush should replace Cheney, and suggested Secretary of State Colin Powell or Arizona Senator John McCain as potential choices. Going into the Republican National Convention at the end of August, many delegates still entertained the notion of a new vice president, with Powell and Giuliani leading in a preference poll. Despite the speculation, Bush publicly maintained his support for Cheney, who accepted the party's formal nomination on September 1.

== Convention and nomination ==
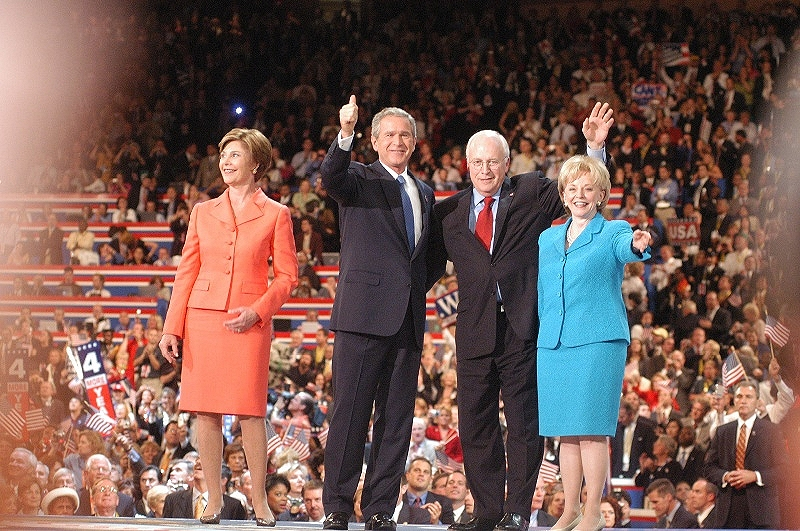
Laura and George Bush with Dick and Lynne Cheney during the convention

Bush gave many promises during his acceptance speech to the 2004 Republican National Convention. At the end of his speech, he encouraged listeners to view his website in order to learn more about his agenda if he wins his next presidential term. His speech promises include the following which his campaign is called "A Plan for A Safer World & More Hopeful America":

- Rewrite and simplification of Tax Code
- Creation of "Opportunity zones" to encourage companies to move into areas where companies closed
- Allowing and encouraging small businesses to join to negotiate for health care
- Establishment of health centers in every poor or rural county in the country that does not have one
- Promoting flexible schedules to make companies family friendly
- More funding for local and community colleges
- Creating personal social security account options to allow social security to be self managed for younger workers

As a result of Bush's speech in NYC, the incumbent president was able to get a significant bounce in the polls. The day after the convention was finished, the polls showed Bush with a double-digit lead over John Kerry, although when the poll asked about the economy both candidates were still in a dead heat.

== Issue stances ==
=== Abortion ===
Bush expressed opinions in agreement with the pro-life movement.

=== Community aid ===
Bush established the White House Office of Faith Based and Community Initiatives, which allowed the federal government to fund community aid programs that were provided by a religious institution. He proposed a youth mentoring program for disadvantaged students and children of prisoners.

=== Economy ===
Bush supported making the tax cuts passed during his first term permanent; he maintained that the tax cuts made the recent recession shallower and shorter than it would otherwise have been.

He supported job creation, by tax loopholes to invest in more higher job creation to "state and local control" than the federal government.

=== Health care ===
Bush's proposals for expanding health care coverage were more modest than those advanced by Senator Kerry. Several estimates were made comparing the cost and impact of the Bush and Kerry proposals. While the estimates varied, they all indicated that the increase in coverage and the funding requirements of the Bush plan would both be lower than those of the more comprehensive Kerry plan.

=== Education ===
Bush signed the No Child Left Behind Act, which requires mandatory standardized testing, forces schools that do not meet standards to provide alternate options for students, and stated the aim of closing the race and gender gap in schools. His FY 2005 budget proposed a 1% increase in elementary and secondary education compared to the FY 2001 budget.

=== Environment ===
Bush's Clear Skies Act repealed or reduced air pollution controls, including environmental protections of the Clean Air Act. His FY 2005 budget provided $4.4 billion for conservation programs. He signed legislation pushing for the cleanup of abandoned industrial sites (also known as brownfields) and keeping forest fires at bay. He fell under criticism for rejecting the Kyoto Protocol which would commit the United States to reducing greenhouse gas emissions which are believed by much of the relevant science community to cause global warming. The Bush administration stated that this would cost the economy up to US$14 billion.

=== Homeland security ===
After the September 11 attacks in 2001, Bush signed the USA PATRIOT Act and created the Department of Homeland Security. He also created the Terrorist Threat Integration Center (TTIC) and the Terrorist Screening Center (TSC). He then promoted the idea of an independent "Czar of Intelligence" outside of the White House in response to the 9/11 Commission's findings.

=== Same-sex marriage and gay rights ===
Bush has expressed support for "protecting the sanctity of marriage." He endorsed the Federal Marriage Amendment, a proposed constitutional amendment that would define marriage for all of the states as strictly heterosexual. Late in the 2004 campaign, however, he said that the states should be allowed to "enable people to you know, be able to have rights, like others", though marriage would not be among them. Activists on both sides of the issue took this comment as endorsing civil unions.

=== Afghanistan ===
Supported continued American involvement in Afghanistan. Believed President Hamid Karzai to be beneficial to Afghanistan's progress.

=== Libya ===
In a series of negotiations which involved Libya, Britain, and the United States, Libya turned over materials relevant to the production of nuclear weapons.

=== Iraq ===
Supported the continuation of American military presence in Iraq. Promoted the goal of democratic elections by January 2005 as integral to the nation's democratic reform. Bush ran as the war president.

=== Saudi Arabia ===
Bush advocated pressure on the Saudi Royal Family to more directly combat terrorism and to seize the assets of terrorists operating within their borders.

== Campaign controversies ==
=== Military service controversy ===
In previous campaigns, Bush had been criticized for his military service record. He skipped over a long waiting list to receive a spot in the Air National Guard; once he was in the Guard, it has been alleged he did not complete all his required duties. These long-standing charges were given more attention in the 2004 campaign because of the contrast with Kerry's record as a decorated combat veteran of the Vietnam War.

A group of Bush supporters countered with an advertising campaign arguing that some of Kerry's medals had been undeserved (see John Kerry military service controversy). The subject was further highlighted when CBS News released memos purportedly from Bush's commanding officer in the Guard. The memos added some unflattering details about Bush's Guard service. Almost immediately, however, widespread doubts were raised about their authenticity. CBS News eventually concluded that it could not validate them and that it should not have used them. The incident may have ended up helping Bush by creating doubts about the legitimacy of his detractors.

=== Television advertising: 9/11 ===
Bush's campaign launched its first major set of television commercials on March 3, 2004. Although these four spots (three in English and one in Spanish) contained no reference to Senator Kerry, two (one in English and the one in Spanish, both titled, "Safer, Stronger") generated controversy for their inclusion of four seconds of images drawn from the aftermath of the September 11, 2001 attacks, including the wreckage of the World Trade Center site, images of New York firefighters (the New York firefighters' union supported Kerry), and the image of a flag-draped coffin being carried out of the attack site.

Some families of 9/11 victims accused the Bush campaign of being insensitive to the memory of those who died and of exploiting the tragedy for his personal political gain. Bush campaign advisor Karen Hughes defended the ads as "very tasteful" and noted that 9/11 was a defining event for Bush's presidency.

The main topic of this heated discussion is the use of actual images of the attack. The use of images from the attack, said Governor of Pennsylvania Ed Rendell, a Democrat, on Face the Nation, implies support from New York firefighters. Rendell claims that a New York firefighters union head supports Kerry for President. But although the International Association of Firefighters was the first union to support Kerry, the Uniformed Firefighters Association of Greater New York endorsed the President for re-election in August 2004.

Defenders of the Bush messages liken his messages to those of Franklin D. Roosevelt's re-election campaign, which used images of the December 7 attack by Japan on the United States and advised Americans to "Remember Pearl Harbor."

== Endorsements ==
George W. Bush received endorsements from many Republicans, Democratic Senator Zell Miller of Georgia and former 12-year mayor of New York City Ed Koch. The Uniformed Firefighters Association of Greater New York, representing 20,000 active and retired firefighters, endorsed the President on August 31, 2004. On September 22, 2004, the Abe Lincoln Black Republican Caucus, a political organization of gay African American Republicans, voted in a special call meeting in Dallas, Texas, to endorse President George W. Bush for re-election.

Actors and Actresses

- Stephen Baldwin
- Ernest Borgnine
- Dean Cain
- Robert Davi
- Doris Day
- Robert Duvall
- Kelsey Grammer
- Angie Harmon
- Patricia Heaton
- Charlton Heston
- Chuck Norris
- Jerry Lewis
- Dolph Lundgren
- Burt Reynolds
- Jane Russell
- Tom Selleck
- Gary Sinise
- Kevin Sorbo
- Arnold Schwarzenegger then governor of California.
- Jon Voight
- Bruce Willis
- James Woods

Musicians

- Clint Black
- Pat Boone
- Brooks and Dunn
- Alice Cooper
- Billy Ray Cyrus
- Gatlin Brothers
- Toby Keith
- Martina McBride
- Reba McEntire
- Wayne Newton
- Kid Rock
- Ricky Skaggs
- Britney Spears
- Randy Travis
- Travis Tritt
- Hank Williams Jr.
- Lee Ann Womack

Politicians

- Zell Miller, governor of Georgia (1991–1999)

Other

- Bill Gates

== Slogan ==
The Bush-Cheney campaign slogan was "Yes, America Can!" The "Heart and Soul of America" tour used "Moving America Forward." The 2004 Republican National Convention in New York City featured "a safer world and a more hopeful America".

== Debates ==
On September 20, the Bush campaign and the Kerry campaign jointly released a memorandum of understanding between the two campaigns. The 32-page MOU covered in minute detail many aspects of the staging and format for the presidential and vice-presidential debates.

On September 30, Bush debated Kerry at University of Miami in Coral Gables, Florida in the first of three scheduled debates. Polls conducted immediately following the debate suggests that a majority of undecided voters believe that, while neither candidate committed any serious gaffes, Kerry fared better than Bush did.

A second debate, in "town hall" format, was held on October 8 at Washington University in St. Louis with Charles Gibson moderating. Bush later attempted to deflect criticism of what was described as his scowling demeanor during the first debate, joking at one point about one of Kerry's remarks, "That answer made me want to scowl."

The final debate occurred on October 13 at Arizona State University and was moderated by Bob Schieffer of CBS News.

The only vice presidential debate between Vice President Dick Cheney and Senator John Edwards happened on October 5 at Case Western Reserve University. It was moderated by Gwen Ifill of the Public Broadcasting Service.

== Features of the campaign ==
The foundation of Bush's campaign for re-election was ideological conservatism. Members of the campaign team believe there are clear ideological differences between George W. Bush and John Kerry, and believe this contrasts with the 2000 Presidential election, in which both candidates attempted to portray themselves as "centrists". Critics have argued that the crux of Bush's campaign was the suggestion that John Kerry would be soft on terrorism in comparison to George Bush, and to present Bush as a "war President". They also claim that the Bush campaign is concerned mainly with personalities rather than tackling ideological issues.

Much of the opposition to the Bush campaign (and vis-a-vis support to the Kerry campaign) took the form of "Anybody but Bush" - voters who would vote for anyone else.

== Campaign visits ==
Not since the 1984 presidential election had Minnesota been an important Battleground Swing State as it was in 2004. As a result, President George W. Bush made 8 unprecedented campaign visits to Minnesota. On April 26, 2004, he made a first time presidential campaign visit to Edina, Minnesota during which Congressmen Jim Ramstad presented The President with the book Lest We Forget by John C. Martin, a U.S. Civil War veteran and Department Commander of the G.A.R. The National Daughters of the Grand Army first presented the book to President Coolidge on August 3, 1928.

== Election and victory ==
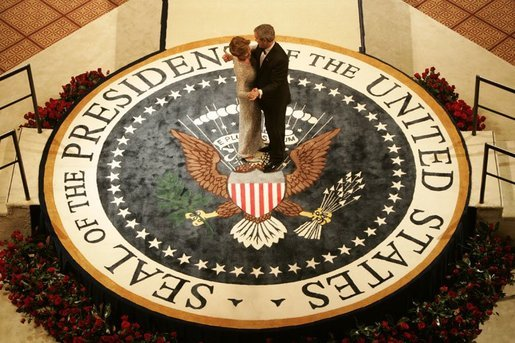
President George W. Bush dances with First Lady Laura Bush during the celebrations of winning re-election. This event was in Washington, D.C. and the theme centered around the Commander-In-Chief.

The election took place on November 2, 2004, and ended with Bush gaining 286 electoral votes and Kerry garnering 251 electoral votes. One vote went to Kerry's running mate and former presidential candidate, John Edwards, when one of the electors (pledged to Kerry) voted for John Edwards by mistake. This was the first time in U.S. history that an elector had voted the same person for president and vice-president. As President Bush's running mate, Vice President Dick Cheney received 286 votes and John Edwards received 252.

The key state that both candidates needed was Ohio. Ohio had 20 electoral votes, which were essential for either candidate to surpass the necessary 270 electoral votes to win the overall election and determined which candidate won the election. Ohio was reporting its results, but had not counted provisional ballots. In Ohio, Kerry trailed by 136,000 votes (not including provisional ballots). The chances of Kerry gaining the necessary votes through provisional ballots was slim.

Around 2:00 p.m. EST on November 3, 2004, John Kerry made a speech at Faneuil Hall, Boston. In this speech, he announced that he "cannot win this election." One hour later, George W. Bush declared that "America has spoken" and they had made a "historic victory." He said to Kerry supporters, "To make this nation stronger and better, I will need your support, and I will work to earn it."

With 286 electoral votes, President George W. Bush won the 2004 Presidential Election. Bush received over 62 million popular votes and Kerry received over 59 million votes.

== See also ==
- 2004 Republican National Convention
- 2004 United States presidential election
- Second inauguration of George W. Bush
- John Kerry 2004 presidential campaign
- George W. Bush 2000 presidential campaign
