= Unity ticket =

Term for candidates from different parties running on one ticket

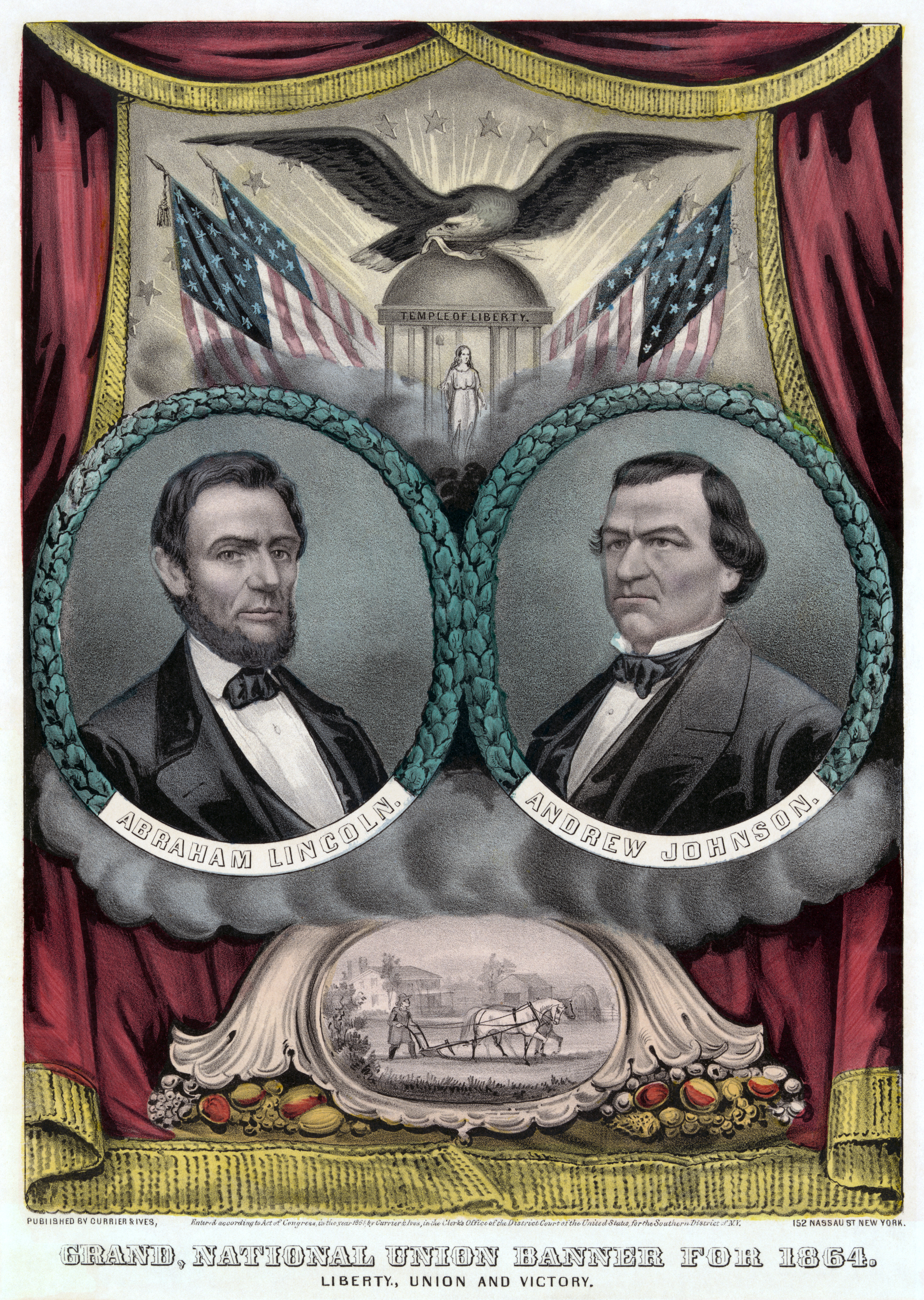
Republican Abraham Lincoln and Democrat Andrew Johnson campaigning on the same ticket in the 1864 United States presidential election.

In a presidential system, a unity ticket is a form of ticket balance in which a candidate and a running mate of separate political parties run on a single ticket. Candidates may retain their separate political parties for the duration of the election, or they may adopt a new party name to represent their unified platform. In a system where the running mate is next in line for the presidency, a unity ticket can cause a mid-term shift in policy if the president dies or is removed from office. Unity tickets are common during periods of political realignment.

The term unity ticket may sometimes be used more broadly for any political ticket that is meant to appeal to two different political factions. A unity ticket is distinct from a fusion ticket where multiple parties endorse a single candidate.

== Brazil ==
Presidential tickets in Brazil commonly have two candidates of competing political parties, and as a result the President of Brazil and the Vice President of Brazil are often of different political parties. In 2010 and 2014, Dilma Rousseff of the Workers' Party and Michel Temer of the Brazilian Democratic Movement were elected under the With the Strength of the People coalition. Following Rousseff's impeachment and removal from office, Temer became president.

== Taiwan ==
In the 2016 presidential election, James Soong of the People First Party ran with Hsu Hsin-ying of the Minkuotang.

== Tanzania ==
Opposition candidate Augustino Mrema of NCCR–Mageuzi was to run on a unity ticket with a candidate from the Civic United Front in the 1995 general election, but the parties were unable to agree on a running mate and the Civic United Front ran its own ticket.

== United States ==
=== Presidential elections ===
Prior to the ratification of the Twelfth Amendment, the presidential runner-up would be elected vice president. This resulted in John Adams of the Federalist Party winning the presidency while opponent Thomas Jefferson of the Democratic-Republican Party became his vice president. The only unity ticket to win the presidency was the National Union Party in the 1864 presidential election, which ran a unity ticket between Abraham Lincoln of the Republican Party and Andrew Johnson of the Democratic Party. Lincoln's assassination resulted in Johnson taking office and drastically changing reconstruction era policy.

Democrat John Kerry considered choosing Republican John McCain as his running mate in the 2004 presidential election. In turn, John McCain gave serious consideration to a unity ticket with former Democrat Joe Lieberman in the 2008 presidential election. Several commentators suggested that the Democratic Party field a unity ticket with a moderate Republican to challenge Donald Trump in 2020 and win the votes of Never Trump Republicans. Presidential unity tickets in the 21st century are often criticized as being unrealistic.

Some notable third party runs have incorporated unity tickets:

- In the 1856 presidential election, former president Millard Fillmore of the Whig Party and Andrew Jackson Donelson of the Democratic Party ran a third-party campaign under the Know Nothing ticket, carrying the state of Maryland.
- In the 1924 presidential election, Robert M. La Follette of the Republican Party and Burton K. Wheeler of the Democratic Party ran a third-party campaign under the Progressive Party, carrying the state of Wisconsin.
- In the 1968 presidential election, George Wallace of the Democratic Party and Curtis LeMay of the Republican Party ran a third-party campaign under the American Independent Party, carrying five states.
- In the 1980 presidential election, John B. Anderson of the Republican Party and Patrick Lucey of the Democratic Party ran an independent campaign, carrying no states.

=== Statewide elections ===
In 2014, Bill Walker of the Republican Party and Byron Mallott of the Democratic Party were elected governor and lieutenant governor of Alaska. Democrat Patrick Murphy floated a gubernatorial campaign with Republican David Jolly in the 2018 Florida gubernatorial election, but they ultimately did not run. When Republican Bob Krist launched an independent campaign in the 2018 Nebraska gubernatorial election, it was speculated that he would run a unity ticket, but he eventually ran as the Democratic nominee with a Democratic running mate.

== See also ==
- Split-ticket voting
- Straight-ticket voting
- Two-party system
- Veepstakes
