= Presidential nominee =

Candidate for president nominated by a political party

In United States politics and government, the term presidential nominee has two different meanings:

1. A candidate for president of the United States who has been selected by the delegates of a political party at the party's national convention (also called a presidential nominating convention) to be that party's official candidate for the presidency.
2. A person nominated by a sitting U.S. president to an executive or judicial post, subject to the advice and consent of the Senate. (See Appointments Clause, List of positions filled by presidential appointment with Senate confirmation.)

== Presumptive nominee ==
In United States presidential elections, the term presumptive nominee is used for presidential candidates who are assumed or projected to be their political party's nominee, but have not yet been formally nominated by their party at the party's nominating convention. A candidate is generally considered to become the presumptive nominee of their party when their last serious challenger drops out or when the candidate mathematically clinches the majority of nominating delegates to the convention—whichever comes first. A candidate mathematically clinches a nomination by securing a simple majority (i.e., more than 50 percent) of delegates through the primaries and caucuses prior to the convention. The time at which news organizations begin to refer to a candidate as the "presumptive nominee" varies from election to election. The shift in media usage from "front-runner" to "presumptive nominee" is considered a significant change for a campaign.

In the modern era, it is the norm for the major political parties' nominees to be effectively determined well before the party conventions; in the past, however, some conventions have begun with the outcome in doubt, requiring multiple rounds of balloting to select a nominee. The last major party conventions with more than one ballot for president occurred in 1972 for the Democrats and 1948 for the Republicans.

Losing candidates, after withdrawing from the primary race, often "release" their delegates, who typically declare support for the presumptive nominee.

A presumptive nominee typically will have already selected a vice-presidential running mate before the nominating convention — this process is sometimes referred to as the "veepstakes".Traditionally, the selection of the vice-presidential nominee has been formally ratified by the party's delegates at the convention.

The term "presumptive nominee" has been criticized by some commentators; language commentator William Safire called it a "bogus title" and preferred the phrase presumed nominee, which was used by The New York Times in 2004.

== See also ==
- List of United States presidential candidates
- Preselection
- Prospective parliamentary candidate
