= George Farah =

American author, pro-democracy activist and political commentator (born 1978)

- Born: May 14, 1978 (age 48); Beirut, Lebanon
- Citizenship: American
- Education: Princeton University (BA); Harvard Law School (JD)
- Occupations: Author, Attorney, Political Commentator, Activist
- Writing career
- Notable work: Book: "No Debate"

George Farah (born 1978) is an American author, attorney, pro-democracy activist, and political commentator.

== Background ==
Farah was born in Beirut, Lebanon in 1978 and moved to the United States at the age of three.

In 2000, Farah graduated from Princeton University with a B.A. in the Woodrow Wilson School of Public and International Affairs. In 2005, he graduated from Harvard Law School with a J.D. He was the recipient of a Paul & Daisy Soros Fellowship for New Americans.

While at Harvard, Farah advocated for the law school to help students find employment at plaintiff-side firms focused on rectifying injustices, rather than focusing so heavily on recruitment by corporate firms.

Farah lives in New York City.

== Career ==
=== Presidential debates ===
U.S. News & World Report described Farah as a "political debate expert and election watch dog." PBS called Farah a "remarkable" author who exposed the "secretive process by which party handlers ensure there won't be a real discussion of the issues" at the presidential debates.

Farah is the author of the book No Debate: How the Republican and Democratic Parties Secretly Control the Presidential Debates, which was published by Seven Stories Press in 2004. He was also the founder and executive director of the non-profit organization Open Debates, which advocated reform of the presidential debate process.

In his book, Farah describes how negotiators for the Republican and Democratic nominees draft secret contracts that dictate the terms of the presidential debates. Those contracts, argued Farah, contain antidemocratic provisions that weaken debate formats and exclude third-party challengers. Through his investigative work, Farah secured copies of the 1992, 1996 and 2004 contracts and made them public for the first time, spurring criticism of the major parties for manipulating the debates.

Farah has repeatedly criticized the Commission on Presidential Debates, a private corporation that has sponsored general election presidential debate since 1988. He argues that the Commission on Presidential Debates was created by the Republican and Democratic parties to "seize control of the presidential debates from the League of Women Voters." Farah claims that the Commission implements and conceals debate contracts negotiated by the major party campaigns.

To reform the presidential debates, Farah has advocated replacing the bipartisan Commission on Presidential Debates with a "truly nonpartisan" Citizens' Debate Commission that would operate transparently, employ challenging formats and adopt democratic candidate selection criteria. He persuaded multiple newspapers and more than 60 civic organizations to endorse the Citizens' Debate Commission. He also helped convince three corporations to withdraw their sponsorship of the Commission on Presidential Debates.

=== Political commentator ===
Farah has published many opinion articles addressing electoral reform issues, wage inequality, media concentration, and foreign policy in the Middle East. His articles have appeared in numerous newspapers and periodicals, including The Washington Post, Newsweek,The Boston Globe, The Philadelphia Inquirer, The Denver Post, Christian Science Monitor, Extra! Magazine, and The Las Vegas Review-Journal.

Farah has been interviewed on many television programs to discuss presidential elections, electoral reform, Supreme Court decisions, and Middle East conflicts. He has appeared on ABC's Nightline, PBS's NOW with Bill Moyers, ABC's 20/20, CNN's Lou Dobbs Tonight, MSNBC's Countdown, Fox News' Fox & Friends, CBS Evening News, CNN's American Morning, MSNBC's Lester Holt Live, Al-Jazeera's Inside Story, and C-Span's Washington Journal.

Farah has also been interviewed on many radio shows, including NPR's All Things Considered, WNYC's The Brian Lehrer Show, Democracy Now!, and CounterSpin.

=== Class-action attorney ===
Farah is a co-founder and partner at the law firm Handley Farah & Anderson, where he litigates antitrust, wage theft, human rights, and civil rights cases on behalf of workers, farmers, and consumers.

The Wall Street Journal reported that Farah developed a historic class action lawsuit that resulted in a $1.8 billion jury verdict against the real estate industry and forced real estate brokers to lower commissions charged to homebuyers.

The Los Angeles Times reported that Farah launched a class action lawsuit against chicken processors for conspiring to depress the wages of hundreds of thousands of low-income workers. The lawsuit resulted in approximately $400 million in settlements.

Farah was part of the litigation team that sued President Donald Trump for violating the Emoluments Clause of the Constitution by accepting payments from foreign and domestic governments.

He developed and litigated a class action lawsuit accusing dairy processors of conspiring to inflate their profits at the expense of thousands of dairy farmers by misreporting data to the federal government. The lawsuit resulted in a $40 million settlement.

Farah litigated a class action that compelled the New York City Police Department to halt the unconstitutional practice of detaining people to conduct warrant searches when no justifiable suspicion exists to do so.

He developed and litigated a lawsuit alleging that a bank discriminated against African-American sugarcane farmers in Louisiana by providing loans on inferior terms than those provided to white sugarcane farmers.

=== Non-profit activism ===
Farah has participated in nonprofit organizations to strengthen democracy and address income inequality. He founded and directed the nonprofit Open Debates; served as treasurer and general counsel of the Campaign for a Living Wage; was a program associate at The Center for the Study of Responsive Law; served on the board of The Modern Classrooms Project; and served on the board of the American Independent Business Alliance.

== Publications ==
=== Book ===
- "No Debate: How the Republican and Democratic Parties Secretly Control the Presidential Debates," Seven Stories Press (2004), 232 Pages, ISBN 9781583226650

=== Articles ===
- "Please Stop Demonizing Palestinians," Newsweek, April 9, 2025
- "Prominent Market Definition Issues in Pharmaceutical Antitrust Cases," Antitrust Magazine, Fall 2015 (Co-authored with Laura Alexander)
- "Commission Prevents Debates from Informing," Las Vegas Review Journal, September 9, 2012
- "Debates Could Be A Whole Lot Better," The Denver Post, October 13, 2008
- "A Moral and Economic Case for a 'Living Wage' Law," The Washington Post, May 4, 2006 (Co-authored with Clayton Sinyai)
- "The Debate Debacle," The Boston Globe, September 18, 2004 (Co-authored with Jesse Ventura)
- "No Debate: Format's a Sham," Fort Lauderdale Sun-Sentinel, August 30, 2004 (Co-authored Tom Gerety)
- "Save 'Genuine' Presidential Debates," Christian Science Monitor, August 10, 2004
- "Get Debates Out of Parties' Grasp," Philadelphia Inquirer, November 14, 2003
- "What's Not Talked About on Sunday Morning?" Extra! Magazine, October 2001, Cover Story (Co-authored with Justin Elga)
