= Ticket balance =

Strategy to bring broad appeal to a political campaign

In United States politics, balancing the ticket is a practice where a political candidate chooses a running mate, usually from the same party, with the goal of bringing more widespread appeal to the campaign. The term is most prominently used to describe the selection of the U.S. vice presidential nominee.

There are several means by which the ticket may be balanced. Someone who is from a different region than the candidate may be chosen as a running mate to provide geographic balance to the ticket. If the candidate is associated with a specific faction of the party, a running mate from a competing faction may be chosen so as to unify the party. Similarly, running mates may be chosen to provide ideological, age, or demographic balance.

In U.S. presidential elections, balancing the ticket was traditionally associated with the smoke-filled room cliché, but this changed in 1970 with reforms in the primary system resulting from the McGovern-Fraser Commission. According to Douglas Kriner of Boston University, the McGovern-Fraser reforms brought an end to traditional ticket balancing practices. Now, presidential candidates are less concerned with regional and ideological balance, says Kriner, and are more inclined to pick compatible running mates with extensive government experience.

Nelson Polsby and Aaron Wildavsky, two notable political scientists of the late 20th century, described ticket balancing as a way to maximize the number of voters that the candidates can appeal to through a broad range of characteristics:

If it is impossible to find one person who combines within his or her heritage, personality, and experience all the virtues allegedly cherished by American voters, the parties console themselves by attempting to confect out of two running mates a composite image of forward-looking-conservative, rural-urban, energetic-wise leadership that evokes hometown, ethnic, and party loyalties among a maximum number of voters. That is, at least, the theory behind the balanced ticket.

== History ==
In the earliest days of American presidential elections, the president and vice president were technically elected on the same Electoral College ballot. The person receiving the most electoral votes becoming the president and the person with the second most votes becoming the vice president. When this system proved unwieldy, the Twelfth Amendment was passed in 1804 providing that the Electoral College use different ballots for president and vice president.

Most elections before the American Civil War featured a Northerner paired with a Southerner or vice versa. After the Civil War, geographical balance between North and South became less critical but would remain a factor well into the 20th century, especially in the Democratic Party. In the 20th century, an increased interest in the Electoral College led many presidential candidates to choose vice presidential candidates from populous states with large numbers of electoral votes. It was hoped that voters in this state could be swayed by having a favorite son on the ticket.

Later in the 20th century, ideological balance became more prominent with a very liberal or conservative presidential candidate often paired with a more moderate vice presidential candidate or vice versa to bring more widespread appeal. Other factors came to prominence in the late 20th century such as gender, religion, age and other issues. The trend has continued in recent times, although it is less of a predictable science. In 1992, Bill Clinton of Arkansas, seen as a more moderate Democrat, chose the more liberal Al Gore of neighboring Tennessee as his running mate. However, they were both white Protestant southerners from the baby boomer generation, and most political analysts saw them as similar in political ideology. This brought little in the way of ticket balancing.

In 2000, Al Gore chose the centrist Joe Lieberman, a Jewish Democrat from Connecticut who had been one of the first people to criticize President Clinton for his scandal with Monica Lewinsky. Four years later, John Kerry of Massachusetts chose John Edwards of North Carolina, which was widely seen as an appeal to Southern voters who traditionally would not have supported a Northeasterner such as Kerry without the geographic balance that Edwards could bring. Also, Edwards, still serving his first term in the Senate, was regarded by many as an "outsider" with a youthful appeal; two characteristics that Kerry, a 60-year-old four-term senator, was unable to acquire.

== Geographic balance ==
Geographic balance has played an important part of politics since the beginning of the country. Before the Civil War, a Northern candidate was almost always paired with a Southern running mate or vice versa. Since the Civil War, this level of geographical balancing is less critical, but still plays a big role. In modern times, voters in the South, Midwest, and Rocky Mountains region are less inclined to support Northeasterners and West Coasters without some sort of geographic balance and vice versa.

For example, in 1952 Dwight D. Eisenhower of New York chose Richard Nixon as his running mate in part because he was from California. In 1960, Nixon chose Henry Cabot Lodge Jr. of Massachusetts to blunt Kennedy's strength in New England. John F. Kennedy of Massachusetts chose Texan Lyndon B. Johnson to appeal to Southern voters.

In elections which are expected to be close, great concern is placed on a running mate's ability to appeal to voters in key states with critical numbers of votes in the Electoral College. In modern times, the United States is generally split along red state/blue state lines, but these lines are not absolute. Key "blue states" like Michigan and Minnesota could be swayed to shift support toward a Republican candidate under the right conditions. Likewise, key presidential "red states" such as North Carolina and Georgia may shift allegiances for the right ticket. A "favorite son" on the ticket from one of these states could garner enough support to swing it from one column to another. In 2016, Democratic nominee Hillary Clinton chose Virginia Senator Tim Kaine partially to solidify the Democrats' hold on the former swing state.

The United States Constitution does not require a president and vice president to be from different states, but does demand some balance, because Electoral College voters cannot vote for two people from their state. For example, in the 2000 election, if Republican vice presidential nominee Dick Cheney, who lived in Texas, had not moved back to his home state of Wyoming and reestablished residency there, then the electors from Texas would not have been able to vote for both Texas Governor George W. Bush for president and Cheney for vice president, and because Texas's 32 electoral votes would have been decisive, no candidate would have received enough votes to become vice president and the Senate would have had to pick one of the top two vote-getters (either Cheney or Joe Lieberman).

=== Democratic Party ===
Historically, the Democrats have often chosen one candidate from the North, and one from the South. This practice began in 1832 when Andrew Jackson, from Tennessee, selected Martin Van Buren, from New York. The practice fell out of favor after the American Civil War, but it became common again from the 1920s.

- 1832: Andrew Jackson (Tennessee), Martin Van Buren (New York)
- 1836: Martin Van Buren (New York), Richard Mentor Johnson (Kentucky)
- 1844: James K. Polk (Tennessee), George M. Dallas (Pennsylvania)
- 1848: Lewis Cass (Michigan), William O. Butler (Kentucky)
- 1852: Franklin Pierce (New Hampshire), William R. King (Alabama)
- 1856: James Buchanan (Pennsylvania), John C. Breckinridge (Kentucky)
- 1860: Stephen A. Douglas (Illinois), Herschel V. Johnson (Georgia)
- 1868: Horatio Seymour (New York), Francis P. Blair (Missouri)
- 1872: Horace Greeley (New York), Benjamin Gratz Brown (Missouri)
- 1904: Alton B. Parker (New York), Henry G. Davis (West Virginia)
- 1924: John W. Davis (West Virginia), Charles W. Bryan (Nebraska)
- 1928: Al Smith (New York), Joseph T. Robinson (Arkansas)
- 1932/1936: Franklin D. Roosevelt (New York), John Nance Garner (Texas)
- 1944: Franklin D. Roosevelt (New York), Harry S. Truman (Missouri)
- 1952: Adlai Stevenson II (Illinois), John Sparkman (Alabama)
- 1956: Adlai Stevenson II (Illinois), Estes Kefauver (Tennessee)
- 1960: John F. Kennedy (Massachusetts), Lyndon B. Johnson (Texas)
- 1964: Lyndon B. Johnson (Texas), Hubert Humphrey (Minnesota)
- 1972: George McGovern (South Dakota), Sargent Shriver (Maryland)
- 1976/1980: Jimmy Carter (Georgia), Walter Mondale (Minnesota)
- 1988: Michael Dukakis (Massachusetts), Lloyd Bentsen (Texas)
- 2000: Al Gore (Tennessee), Joe Lieberman (Connecticut)
- 2004: John Kerry (Massachusetts), John Edwards (North Carolina)
- 2008/2012: Barack Obama (Illinois), Joe Biden (Delaware)
- 2016: Hillary Clinton (New York), Tim Kaine (Virginia)

=== Republican Party ===
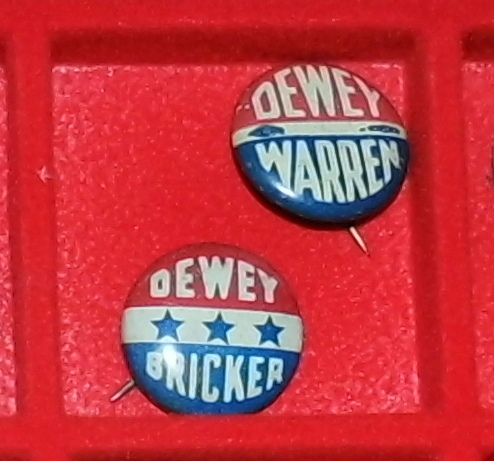
Thomas E. Dewey, a Northeasterner, was the unsuccessful Republican nominee in 1944 and 1948. To provide geographic balance to the ticket, he chose a Midwesterner as his running mate the first time and a Westerner the second. (Campaign buttons shown).

North-South ticket balance is practiced to a lesser extent by the Republicans, although what is more common is Northeast-Midwest or Northeast-West balance. The Republicans utilized this strategy in every presidential election from 1872 until 1924, and again from 1940 to 1972. It has used geographic balance less frequently since then, except for a brief resurgence in the 2010s.

- 1856: John C. Frémont (California), William L. Dayton (New Jersey)
- 1860: Abraham Lincoln (Illinois), Hannibal Hamlin (Maine)
- 1872: Ulysses S. Grant (Illinois), Henry Wilson (Massachusetts)
- 1876: Rutherford B. Hayes (Ohio), William A. Wheeler (New York)
- 1880: James A. Garfield (Ohio), Chester A. Arthur (New York)
- 1884: James G. Blaine (Maine), John A. Logan (Illinois)
- 1888: Benjamin Harrison (Indiana), Levi P. Morton (New York)
- 1892: Benjamin Harrison (Indiana), Whitelaw Reid (New York)
- 1896: William McKinley (Ohio), Garret Hobart (New Jersey)
- 1900: William McKinley (Ohio), Theodore Roosevelt (New York)
- 1904: Theodore Roosevelt (New York), Charles W. Fairbanks (Indiana)
- 1908: William Howard Taft (Ohio), James S. Sherman (New York)
- 1912: William Howard Taft (Ohio), Nicholas M. Butler (New York)
- 1916: Charles E. Hughes (New York), Charles W. Fairbanks (Indiana)
- 1920: Warren G. Harding (Ohio), Calvin Coolidge (Massachusetts)
- 1924: Calvin Coolidge (Massachusetts), Charles G. Dawes (Ohio)
- 1940: Wendell Willkie (New York), Charles L. McNary (Oregon)
- 1944: Thomas E. Dewey (New York), John W. Bricker (Ohio)
- 1948: Thomas E. Dewey (New York), Earl Warren (California)
- 1952/1956: Dwight D. Eisenhower (New York), Richard Nixon (California)
- 1960: Richard Nixon (California), Henry Cabot Lodge Jr. (Massachusetts)
- 1964: Barry Goldwater (Arizona), William E. Miller (New York)
- 1968/1972: Richard Nixon (California), Spiro Agnew (Maryland)
- 1996: Bob Dole (Kansas), Jack Kemp (New York)
- 2012: Mitt Romney (Massachusetts), Paul Ryan (Wisconsin)
- 2016: Donald Trump (New York), Mike Pence (Indiana) (Note: The same candidates were on the 2020 ballot, although Donald Trump changed his primary residency to the state of Florida prior to the 2020 election.)

== Ideological balance ==
Ideological balance is achieved when a candidate chooses a running mate from a different ideological strain to provide more widespread appeal. For example, a liberal candidate might want to choose a moderate or even a conservative running mate rather than another liberal in order to appeal to a broader base of the electorate. When liberal Democrat Michael Dukakis ran for president in 1988 he chose Lloyd Bentsen, a moderate, as his running mate. Also in 1988, George H. W. Bush, who was perceived as a traditional conservative Republican chose Dan Quayle, a staunch conservative Republican as his running mate. The same applied in 2000 when Al Gore a moderate-liberal Democrat, chose Joe Lieberman, a moderate-conservative Democrat. Similarly, John McCain's choice of Sarah Palin as his running mate in 2008 allowed McCain, who many perceived as a moderate, to appeal to more conservative sectors of the Republican Party. Another example was in 2020 when Joe Biden, who was perceived as a moderate-liberal Democrat, selected Kamala Harris, who was perceived as more liberal and progressive than Biden. A running mate may be chosen from a separate party to appeal to swing voters or voters of the other party, creating a unity ticket.

== Other factors ==
Sometimes candidates will try to appeal to a particular demographic group, or will try to make up for a perceived weakness, through the choice of a particular running mate. Walter Mondale's selection of Geraldine Ferraro in 1984 was widely seen as an appeal to female voters, and the same was true in 2008 when John McCain chose Sarah Palin, and in 2020 when Joe Biden picked Kamala Harris. Additionally, Biden's selection of Harris was to gain the appeal of black and Asian voters. Barack Obama's selection of Joe Biden as his running mate was often considered a way to augment Obama's lack of foreign policy experience with Biden, who was the chair of the Senate Foreign Relations Committee. George W. Bush was considered a political novice and outsider when he chose Dick Cheney, a consummate Washington insider, as his running mate in 2000. In 2016, businessman Donald Trump who had no political experience chose a career politician, Indiana Governor Mike Pence.

Occasionally, older presidential candidates have intentionally chosen someone at least a generation younger as their running mates, mainly to garner younger voters who often see older candidates as "uncool" or "out of touch". George H. W. Bush was 64 when he chose 41-year-old Dan Quayle in 1988. Mitt Romney was 65 years old when he picked Paul Ryan who was 42 years old in 2012. Joe Biden was 77 years old when he chose Kamala Harris who was 55 years old in 2020. Four years later, 78-year-old Donald Trump picked 40-year-old JD Vance. Conversely, a young presidential nominee might pick an older and more experienced person to be their running mate. One example was in 2008, when Barack Obama, who was 47, chose Joe Biden, who was 65.

== Synergy of traits ==
Most ticket balancing is not limited to a single issue but is a factor of the overall strength that the running mate brings to a campaign. Lyndon B. Johnson was chosen by John F. Kennedy in 1960 not only because he was a Southerner, but for other reasons as well. Johnson was perceived at the time as being more conservative than Kennedy which balanced the ticket ideologically. Johnson was likely to deliver Texas and its critical electoral votes to the Democrats, something that Kennedy and a non-Texan might not have been able to accomplish. Kennedy was a Catholic and his religion was a subtle but important issue, especially in the largely Protestant Southern states. The fact that Johnson was a Protestant helped the ticket's appeal in the South. Kennedy was part of an upper class New England family, while Johnson came from more humble and rural upbringings.

In 1952, Dwight D. Eisenhower, who was 61 at the time, chose Richard Nixon, age 39, to be his running mate. Nixon's relative youth and solid anti-communist credentials gave an additional boost to the campaign. When 72-year-old moderate Republican John McCain ran for president in 2008, he chose 44-year-old staunch conservative Sarah Palin as his running mate, in an effort to balance the ticket by age, gender and political philosophy.

Sometimes a candidate that is perceived to be uncharismatic or is known to have gaffes or issues with their own character may pick someone who doesn't have these issues. A good example is in 2020, Joe Biden who was often heavily criticized for being gaffe-prone chose a critically acclaimed speaker and stronger debater, Kamala Harris.

Even in circumstances where ticket balancing is not overt, there are subtle components that are brought to the ticket. Although Bill Clinton and Al Gore were both white, Protestant, baby boomers, and Southerners, Al Gore was a veteran of the Vietnam War while Clinton was heavily criticized by Republicans because he "dodged" the Vietnam Era draft. Gore's military record helped soften some of the criticism about Clinton's ability to lead the military.

== Other political races ==
In some states, the governor and the lieutenant governor are elected on the same ticket. In states that allow the governor to choose his running mate, they may choose a candidate that provides balance within the state just as in presidential politics. For example, a politician from the state's largest metropolitan area may select a running mate from elsewhere in the state, or a male candidate may select a female running mate.

=== In other countries ===
Although the concept of a running-mate is mostly discussed in the context of United States politics, analogous patterns can be found in other countries. For example, in proportional representation with party lists, parties will tend to make sure that a variety of factions within the party are represented in the list candidates. Some countries (such as Iraq) enforce balance through reserved political positions, legally requiring that a list contain a minimum number of female or ethnic minority candidates, or by requiring (such as Lebanon) that vice presidents or prime ministers be of a different ethnic group of religion than the president.

==== Nigeria ====
In Nigeria, it is common for parties nominating candidates for president and vice president to apply both geographic balance (called "zoning"), picking a northerner and a southerner, and religious balance, picking a Christian and a Muslim. As the south is mainly Christian and the north is mainly Muslim, this is the most common geographic-religious permutation. Same-religion tickets, whether a Christian–Christian ticket or a Muslim–Muslim ticket, are controversial and often lead to accusations that such a ticket would disrupt the power balance between Nigeria's religious communities.

When Bola Tinubu, a southern Muslim, was running for the nomination of the All Progressives Congress (APC) as their candidate in the 2023 presidential election, he said that having both geographic and religious balance would be impossible. In Tinubu's opinion there were no qualified northern Christians in the APC, and after winning the party's nomination he ended up picking Kashim Shettima, a northern Muslim, as his running mate, sparking a controversy over religious identity.

==== Philippines ====
In the Philippines, which had derived the presidential system from the United States, all presidential tickets from major parties from 1935 to 1969 involved someone from Luzon and someone from either the Visayas or Mindanao, which was popularly known as the North-South ticket (or South-North ticket). That has been abandoned since the 1986 election.

== See also ==
- Reserved political positions
- Veepstakes
