= Let America be America Again =

1935 poem by Langston Hughes

"Let America Be America Again" is a poem written in 1935 by American poet Langston Hughes. It was originally published in the July 1936 issue of Esquire Magazine. The poem was republished in the 1937 issue of Kansas Magazine and was revised and included in a small collection of Langston Hughes poems entitled A New Song, published by the International Workers Order in 1938.

The poem speaks of the American dream that never existed for the lower-class American and the freedom and equality that every immigrant hoped for but never received. In his poem, Hughes represents not only African Americans, but other economically disadvantaged and minority groups as well.

The title of this poem was used by Democratic United States senator John Kerry as a campaign slogan in his 2004 presidential campaign.

Let America Be America Again: Conversations with Langston Hughes, edited by Christopher C. De Santis and published by Oxford University Press in 2022, is a collection of speeches and conversational essays by, and interviews with, Langston Hughes.
