= Charles Gibson =

American broadcast television anchor and journalist (born 1943)

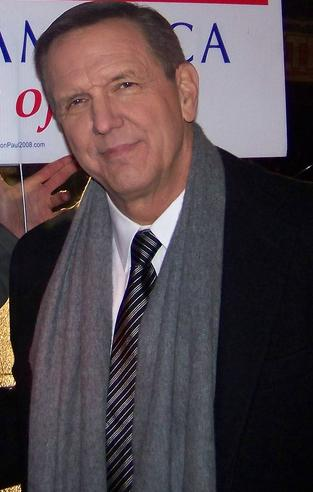
- Gibson in 2008
- Born: Charles deWolf Gibson; March 9, 1943 (age 83); Evanston, Illinois, U.S.
- Education: Princeton University
- Occupation: Television journalist
- Years active: 1965–2016; 2022–present
- Notable credits: Narrator for This Week (2012‍–‍2014); World News with Charles Gibson anchor (2006‍–‍2009); Good Morning America co‑anchor (1987–1998; 1999‍–‍2006); World News Saturday anchor (1987); ABC News House of Representatives correspondent (1981‍–‍1987); ABC News general assignment reporter (1977‍–‍1981); ABC News White House correspondent (1976‍–‍1977); The Bookcase, co-host with daughter Kate (2022‍–‍present); ABC Audio
- Spouse: Arlene Gibson
- Children: 2

Charles deWolf Gibson (born March 9, 1943) is an American broadcast television anchor, journalist, and podcaster. Gibson was a host of Good Morning America from 1987 to 1998 and again from 1999 to 2006, and the anchor of ABC World News from 2006 to 2009.

In 1965, Gibson worked as the news director for Princeton University's student-run radio station, a radio producer for RKO, and a reporter for local television stations. In 1975, he joined ABC News, where he worked as a general assignment reporter and a correspondent from Washington, D.C.

== Early life and education ==
Gibson was born on March 9, 1943, in Evanston, Illinois, to Georgianna Law and Burdett Gibson, and is a great-nephew of graphic artist Charles Dana Gibson. He grew up in Washington, D.C., and attended the Sidwell Friends School, a private college-preparatory school in Washington.

In 1965, Gibson graduated with an A.B. in history from Princeton University, where he was News Director for WPRB-FM, the university radio station, and a member of Princeton Tower Club. Gibson completed a senior thesis titled "The Land and Capital Problems of Pre-Famine Ireland." In 1966, he served in the United States Coast Guard.

== Career ==
=== Early career ===
Gibson joined RKO General in 1966 as a producer and later worked as a reporter and anchor for WLVA (now WSET) television in Lynchburg, Virginia. In 1970, he moved to WMAL-TV (now WJLA) television, the ABC network affiliate in Washington, D.C. Gibson joined the syndicated news service Television News Inc. (TVN) in 1974. For TVN, he covered the Watergate scandal investigations and the resignation of President Richard Nixon.

=== ABC News ===
==== Field correspondent ====
Gibson joined ABC News in 1975, where he worked as its White House correspondent from 1976 to 1977, a general assignment reporter from 1977 to 1981, and House of Representatives correspondent from 1981 to 1987. Gibson was a correspondent and stand-in anchor for World News Tonight with Peter Jennings, anchored World News Saturday and substitute anchor on the late-night hard and soft news program Nightline and World News This Morning.

==== Good Morning America ====
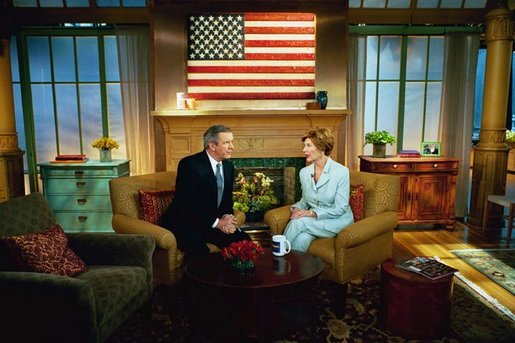
Gibson interviewing First Lady Laura Bush on GMA in 2004

On February 23, 1987, Gibson first became a co-anchor of Good Morning America, alongside Joan Lunden. From 1985 to 1995, Good Morning America was the most-watched morning show on American television.

Gibson hosted and narrated the Maryland Public Television documentary Lucky Number, a program about problem gambling, in 1990.

During the 1992 presidential campaign, Vice President Dan Quayle criticized Ross Perot over remarks Perot had made during an interview with Gibson on Good Morning America concerning the United States Constitution. In June 1992, Gibson interviewed Democratic presidential candidate Bill Clinton and pressed him to identify his running mate.

On May 1, 1998, Gibson left Good Morning America and was replaced by Kevin Newman. ABC reinstated Gibson on January 18, 1999, with Diane Sawyer as co-anchor. He remained with the program until June 28, 2006, when he left to become anchor of World News Tonight.

During the September 11 attacks, Gibson and Sawyer were anchoring Good Morning America. After the second plane struck the South Tower, Gibson recognized that the United States was under attack.

During the 2004 U.S. presidential-election campaign, Gibson moderated the second presidential debate in St. Louis, Missouri, between the two nominee candidates – Republican incumbent President George W. Bush and Democratic U.S. Senator John Kerry. That debate took place on October 8, 2004.

==== World News with Charles Gibson ====
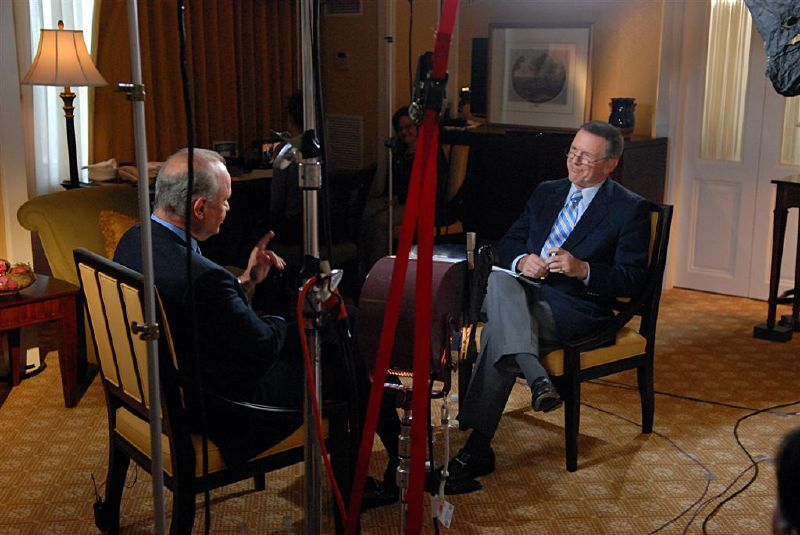
Gibson interviews Republican former U.S. Senator Fred Thompson during Thompson's unsuccessful campaign for the Republican Party's 2008 U.S. presidential nomination, September 25, 2007.

In 2005, Gibson was among the substitute anchors for World News Tonight while Peter Jennings underwent treatment for lung cancer. Following Jennings's death on August 7, 2005, Gibson anchored World News Tonight the following evening. Gibson was considered a leading candidate to succeed Jennings, but ABC selected Elizabeth Vargas and Bob Woodruff as co-anchors of World News Tonight, beginning January 2, 2006. Following Woodruff's injury in Iraq, ABC News again considered Gibson for the position. On May 23, 2006, ABC News announced that Gibson would become the program's sole anchor following Vargas's departure.

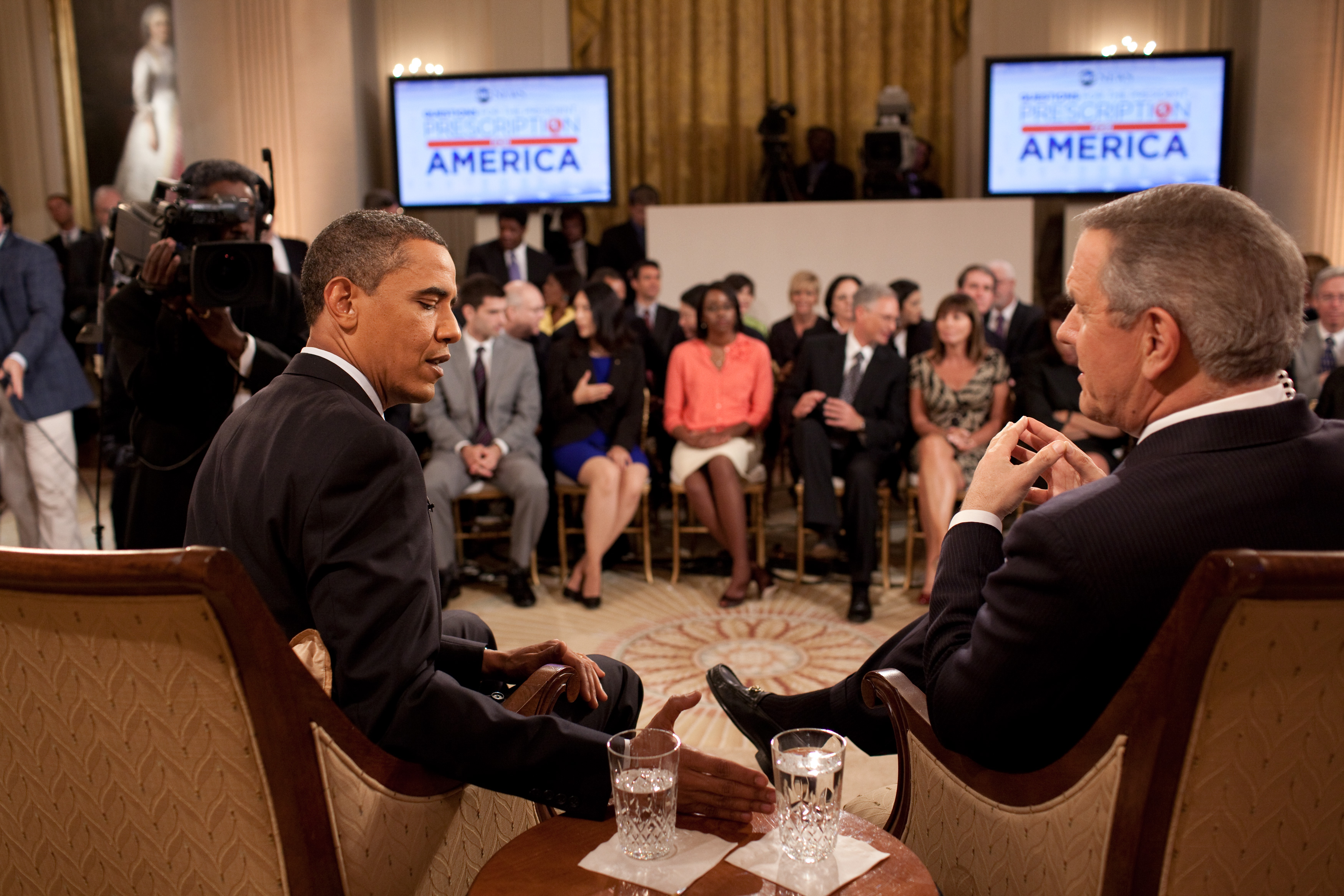
President Barack Obama with Gibson in the East Room of the White House during ABC News's Prescription for America "town-hall"-style conversation on health care, June 24, 2009.

During the summer of 2006, the program's title was changed to World News with Charles Gibson. According to The New York Times, he had previously planned to retire from ABC News on June 22, 2007, but changed his mind.

During the 2008 U.S. presidential-election campaign, Gibson was a co-moderator with George Stephanopoulos, another ABC News journalist, for the April 16, 2008, Democratic Party's presidential-election debate in Philadelphia, Pennsylvania, between U.S. Senators Hillary Clinton and Barack Obama; it was broadcast exclusively by ABC News. Both moderators were later criticized in The Washington Post and other media outlets for their selection of insubstantial, "gotcha"-style questions. Stephanopoulos acknowledged the legitimacy of the concerns over the order of the questions, but said they were regarding issues in the campaign that had not been covered in previous debates. ABC had sought out a woman who opposed Obama and aired a video of her asking a trivial question, repeated by Stephanopolous, about why Obama was not wearing a flag pin. The question brought widespread criticism from the media. He moderated both the Republican and the Democratic ABC, Facebook debates at Saint Anselm College on January 5, 2008.

On September 11, 2008, Gibson interviewed Sarah Palin, the 2008 Republican vice-presidential nominee candidate, her first interview after being named as presidential nominee John McCain's running mate. The interview received criticism from some political commentators, specifically surrounding Gibson's question regarding the term "Bush Doctrine" due to its having a variety of differing meanings.

During Gibson's tenure, World News was a solid competitor and sporadically beat NBC Nightly News, anchored by Brian Williams, in the program ratings during 2007, the first time in several years, and the ABC program became much more distant second place after he retired. The two programs have taken turns at the top of the ratings among household viewers and the 25–54 age group prized by advertisers. Katie Couric's CBS Evening News remained a distant third. During his last few months as anchor, Gibson also worked on a special documentary about the oil industry entitled Over a Barrel: The Truth About Oil, which was a critical and ratings success and earned him several awards.

According to reports, while ABC tried to persuade Gibson to stay on as anchor, he decided to retire. On September 2, 2009, ABC News announced that Diane Sawyer would replace Gibson as the World News anchor following his retirement from ABC News. Gibson anchored his final edition of World News on December 18, 2009.

== Later work ==
In December 2010, Gibson participated as a speaker on Voices in Leadership, an original Harvard T.H. Chan School of Public Health webcast series, in a discussion titled, "Lessons Learned as an ABC News Anchor," moderated by Dr. Robert Blendon.

In 2016, he appears as a news anchor in season 4 of the Netflix original series House of Cards.

During ABC News' live presidential election coverage on November 8, 2016, Gibson appeared as a contributor.

On May 2, 2022, Gibson returned to ABC where he hosted a podcast for ABC Audio with his daughter Kate. The podcast, titled The Bookcase, was designed to feature authors, book industry insiders and local independent bookstores. The first episode featured Oprah Winfrey who discussed the impact of her bookclub, how she picks her choices and her own reading habits. The two regularly make appearances on Good Morning America to update readers on the book world.

== Awards and honors ==
In 1973, the National Endowment for the Humanities awarded him a National Journalism Fellowship. The Radio Television Digital News Association awarded Gibson the Paul White Award in 2006, and in 2008 Quinnipiac University awarded him the Fred Friendly First Amendment Award.

== Personal life ==
Gibson's wife, Arlene Gibson, is an educator who retired in 2006 as head of school at The Spence School in New York City. She has also held positions at other schools in New York City and New Jersey, and was previously the head of the middle school at the Bryn Mawr School in Baltimore, Maryland, in the 1980s. She is on the board of trustees at her alma mater, Bryn Mawr College in Bryn Mawr, Pennsylvania.

They have two daughters, Jessica and Katherine. On March 14, 2006, Jessica gave birth to Gibson's first grandchild.

Gibson has resided with his family in Summit, New Jersey.

Beginning in 2006, Gibson was a member of the board of trustees of Princeton University, until his term expired in 2015.

On May 28, 1989, Gibson delivered the commencement address at Vassar College. On May 17, 2006, Gibson delivered the commencement address at Monmouth University's class of 2006's graduation ceremony held at the PNC Bank Arts Center in Holmdel Township, New Jersey. He was also presented with a doctor of humane letters, an honorary degree.

On June 17, 2007, Gibson delivered the commencement address to the class of 2007's graduation ceremony at Union College in Schenectady, New York. Gibson also received an honorary doctor of humane letters, as well as a framed copy of his father's 1923 college yearbook entry. His father, Burdett Gibson, grew up in Schenectady and graduated from the college in 1923. Gibson contributed an estimated US$75,000 to the college to help create the Burdett Gibson Class of 1923 Scholarship, which is awarded annually to a deserving student in need.

== Career timeline ==
- 1966 – Gibson joined the RKO General as a producer and later worked as a reporter and anchor for WLVA (now WSET) television in Lynchburg, Virginia. In 1970, he moved to WMAL-TV (now WJLA) television, the ABC network affiliate in Washington, D.C. Gibson joined the syndicated news service Television News, Inc. (TVN) in 1974.
- 1970–1973 – anchor and reporter at WMAL-TV, the ABC television-network affiliate in Washington, D.C.
- 1977–1981 – general-assignment correspondent for the ABC News division of the ABC television network.
- 1981–1987 – chief correspondent for the U.S. House of Representatives for ABC News.
- February 1987–May 1998; January 1999–June 2006 – co-anchor of ABC News's Good Morning America, a breakfast television news and talk program.
- 1998–2000 – co-anchor of ABC News's newsmagazine program 20/20
- 2000–2004 – co-anchor of ABC News's Primetime, a television newsmagazine.
- October 2004 – moderator of a "town-hall"-style debate during the 2004 U.S. presidential-election campaign between candidates Republican U.S. President George W. Bush and Democratic U.S. Senator John Kerry.
- May 2006 – December 2009 – anchor of World News with Charles Gibson.
- January 2008 – moderator of debates between the Democratic candidates, as well as Republican candidates.
- April 2008 – co-moderator of a Democratic Party U.S. presidential-campaign debate between candidates – U.S. Senators Hillary Clinton and Barack Obama – during the 2008 Democratic Party presidential primaries.
- September 2008 – conducts the first major interview of Sarah Palin after she was named the Republican Party's U.S. vice-presidential candidate.
- September 2009 – ABC News announces Gibson's plans to retire as anchor of World News with Charles Gibson in late 2009 and that ABC News' Diane Sawyer will become the World News anchor.
- December 18, 2009 – Gibson delivers his final broadcast on World News with a farewell speech.

Media offices
Preceded by David Hartman and Joan Lunden	Good Morning America co-anchor February 23, 1987–May 1, 1998 with Joan Lunden from February 23, 1987 to September 5, 1997, and with Lisa McRee from September 8, 1997 to May 1, 1998	Succeeded by Lisa McRee and Kevin Newman
Preceded by Lisa McRee and Kevin Newman	Good Morning America co-anchor January 18, 1999–June 28, 2006 with Diane Sawyer from 1999 to 2006, and Robin Roberts starting in 2005	Succeeded by Diane Sawyer and Robin Roberts
Preceded by Elizabeth Vargas and Bob Woodruff	ABC World News Tonight anchor May 29, 2006–December 18, 2009	Succeeded by Diane Sawyer
