= Steve Chapman (columnist) =

American journalist

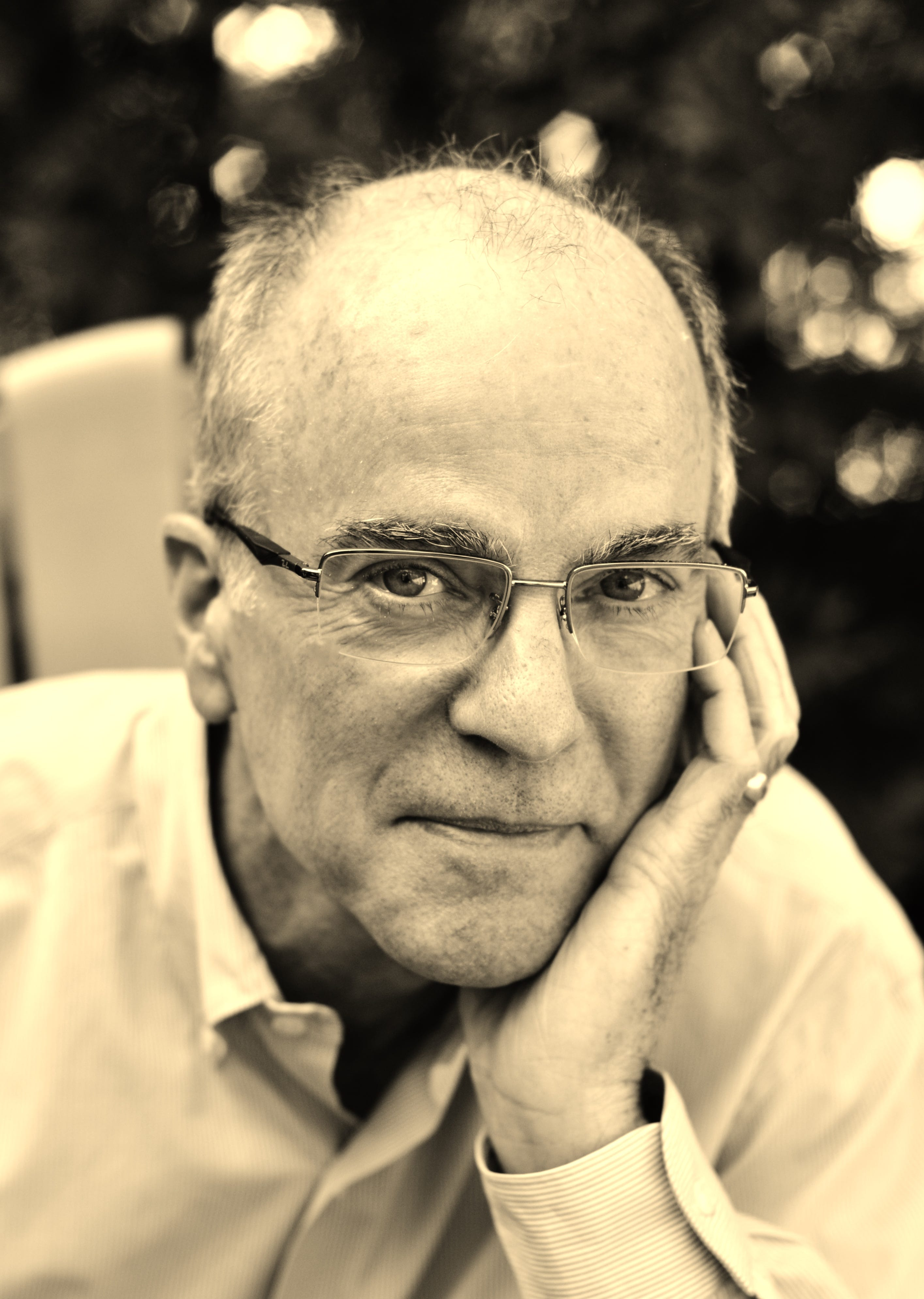
- Chapman in 2022
- Born: February 25, 1954 (age 72); Brady, Texas
- Education: Harvard College (BA)
- Occupation: Columnist

Stephen James “Steve” Chapman (born February 25, 1954) is an American opinion journalist and contributing columnist for the Chicago Tribune.

== Early life and education ==
Chapman was born in Brady, Texas and grew up in Midland and Austin, graduating from A.N. McCallum High School. He attended Harvard College, where he was on the staff of The Harvard Crimson, and graduated cum laude in 1976.

== Career ==
Chapman was a staff writer and associate editor of The New Republic magazine from 1978 to 1981. He joined the editorial board of the Chicago Tribune in 1981 and began writing a twice-a-week opinion column on national and international affairs in 1982. His column was syndicated by Creators Syndicate. He took a buyout from the Tribune in 2021, and currently writes a monthly column for them.

Media critic Jack Shafer has described him as “a polymath, a creative policy wonk, a tap-dancing writer, a true son of liberty, (and) a failed Christian,” noting his “pro-gun, antigovernment, pro-peace, anti-drug-war, pro-market views.”

Chapman has described his political views as “moderate libertarian.”

== Personal life ==
Chapman has two sons and a daughter from his first marriage. He married Cyn Sansing Mycoskie in 2007 and has three stepsons.

== Bibliography ==
- Chapman, Steve (2016). Recalculating: Steve Chapman on a New Century: Collected Columns from the Chicago Tribune. Agate Digital.
