= Citizens' Debate Commission =

The Citizens' Debate Commission (CDC) is a nonpartisan American organization, formed in 2004, that was established to sponsor future general election presidential debates.

The CDC consists of national civic leaders from a multitude of political orientations and has an advisory board composed of over fifty civic organizations that it claims broadly reflects the composition and concerns of the electorate.

The CDC states that it was formed because the Commission on Presidential Debates (CPD) fails to adequately serve voters' interests and charges that the CPD, which was created by the Republican and Democratic parties, secretly awards control of the presidential debates to the Republican and Democratic candidates, thereby limiting voter choice and restricting subject matters of political discourse.

The CDC claims to aim to host presidential debates that serve American voters, not political parties, first. The CDC promises to set fair candidate selection criteria, feature innovative and engaging formats, and resist anti-democratic demands of participating candidates. The CDC also promises to operate with full transparency and reverse the decline in debate viewership (Under the tenure of the CPD, debate viewership has dropped by over 25 million viewers.)

== Participant selection criteria ==
The Citizens' Debate Commission (CDC) employs criteria developed by the Appleseed Citizens' Task Force on Fair Debates, a project of the Appleseed Electoral Reform Project at American University's Washington College of Law.

The Appleseed Task Force criteria includes all candidates on enough state ballots to win an electoral college majority who either 1) register at five percent in national polls or 2) register a majority in national polls asking eligible voters which candidates they would like to see included in the presidential debates.

The Appleseed criteria attempts to ensure that popular third party challengers are allowed to participate without drowning out the voices of the two leading contenders for the presidency. In 1984 and 1988, only the major party candidates fulfilled the Appleseed criteria; in 1996 and 1992, only H. Ross Perot and the major party candidates managed to meet the Appleseed threshold; and in 2000, only Ralph Nader, Pat Buchanan and the major party candidates satisfied the criteria.

The CDC says the two prongs of the Appleseed criteria that trigger inclusion, five percent and majority support, are sensible because they are rooted in democratic principles and federal law. The five percent threshold matches the public financing threshold for minor parties, which is the only legislative standard for measuring the viability of non-major parties. Elected officials codified five percent in the Federal Election Campaign Act, and taxpayers finance candidates whose parties attract five percent of the popular vote.

== Format ==
The Citizens' Debate Commission advocates the following format stipulations for future presidential debates:

1. Follow-up questions must be permitted in every debate.
2. At least one debate must include candidate-to-candidate questioning.
3. At least two debates must include rebuttals and surrebuttals.
4. Response times must not be overly restrictive.
5. Candidates may only exercise a limited number of vetoes concerning the selection of moderators and panelists.

The Citizens' Debate Commission also proposes the following four basic formats for future presidential debates:

1. Two single-moderator debates.
2. Authentic town-hall debate.
3. Youth debate.
4. Panel debate.
