= Veepstakes =

Selection of a running mate by U.S. presidential candidates

Veepstakes is an informal term for the quadrennial process in which candidates for president of the United States select a running mate. If the ticket wins, the running mate becomes the vice president of the United States and first in line to the presidency.

== Etymology ==
A blend word of the words "veep" and "sweepstakes", the neologism has been found in print as far back as 1952.

== Selection process ==
Once the Republican Party and the Democratic Party choose their presumptive presidential nominees for the election, the candidates themselves choose their running mates. Running mates are heavily vetted before being announced in the weeks prior to the party national convention. The selection of a running mate is given considerable attention because the individual chosen can be seen to broaden the ticket's appeal by complementing and balancing its strengths, ideologically, geographically, and with respect to credentials on either foreign or domestic policy.

Occasionally, the running mate is chosen from the pool of candidates who also ran in the primary, as was the case in 1960 with John F. Kennedy choosing Lyndon B. Johnson, 1980 with Ronald Reagan choosing George H. W. Bush, 2004 with John Kerry picking John Edwards, 2008 with Barack Obama picking Joe Biden, and in 2020 with Biden picking Kamala Harris.

Some presidential candidates who did not win their party's nomination have prematurely announced running mates, such as Ronald Reagan selecting Richard Schweiker in 1976, and Ted Cruz selecting Carly Fiorina in 2016.

== Historical examples ==
In 1960, when Senator John F. Kennedy of Massachusetts won his party's presidential nomination, he chose Senator Lyndon B. Johnson of Texas in an effort to win that state's critical electoral votes and to enhance his appeal in the South.

In 2000, Texas Governor George W. Bush attempted to counter a perception of his inexperience by choosing Dick Cheney, a former White House Chief of Staff, House Representative, Secretary of Defense, and CEO of Halliburton.

== See also ==
- Ticket balance
