= Timeline of the 2004 United States presidential election =

This is a timeline of events during the 2004 U.S. presidential election.

Republican Party ticket

President George W. Bush

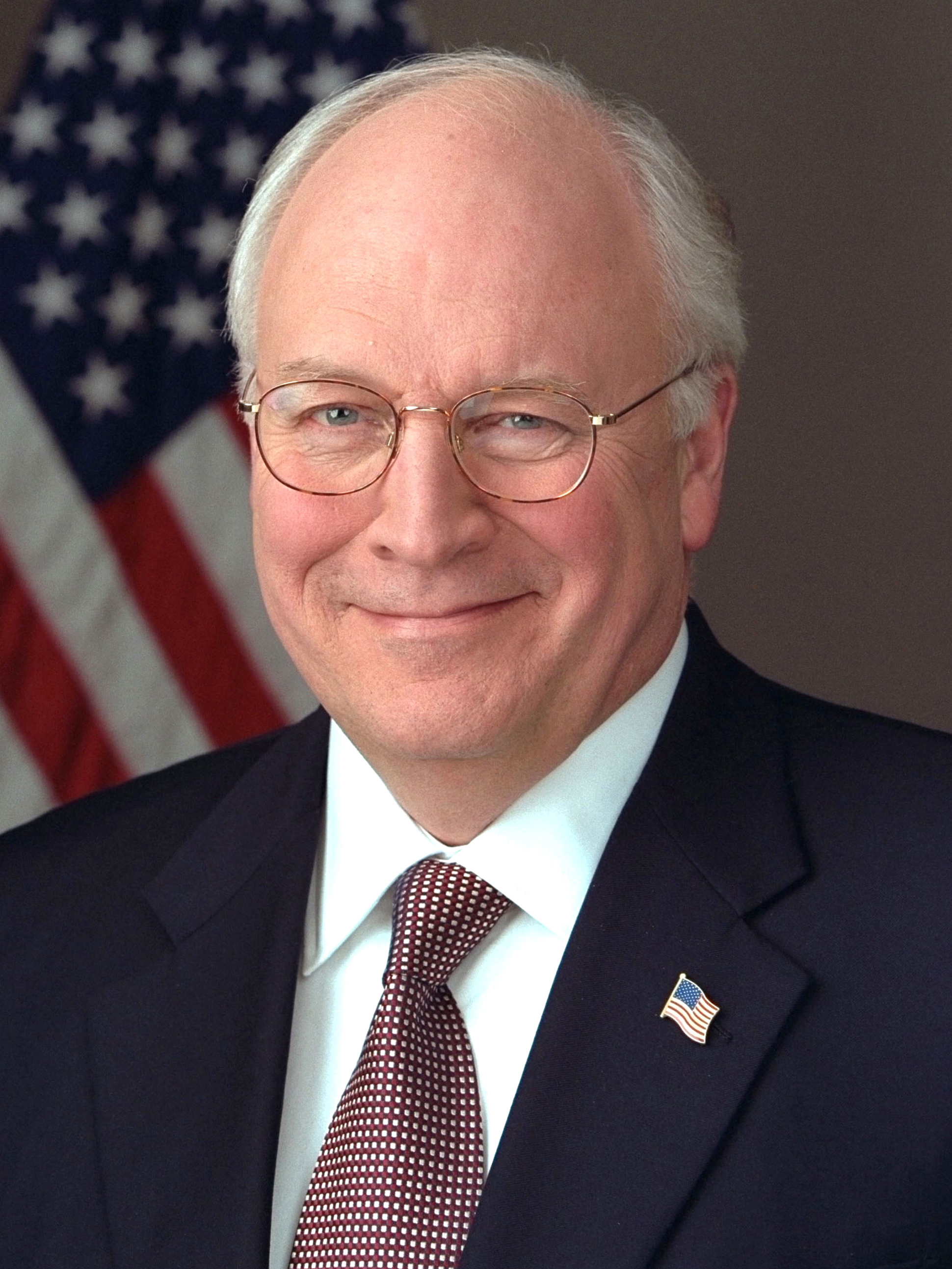
Vice President Dick Cheney

Democratic Party ticket

Senator John Kerry

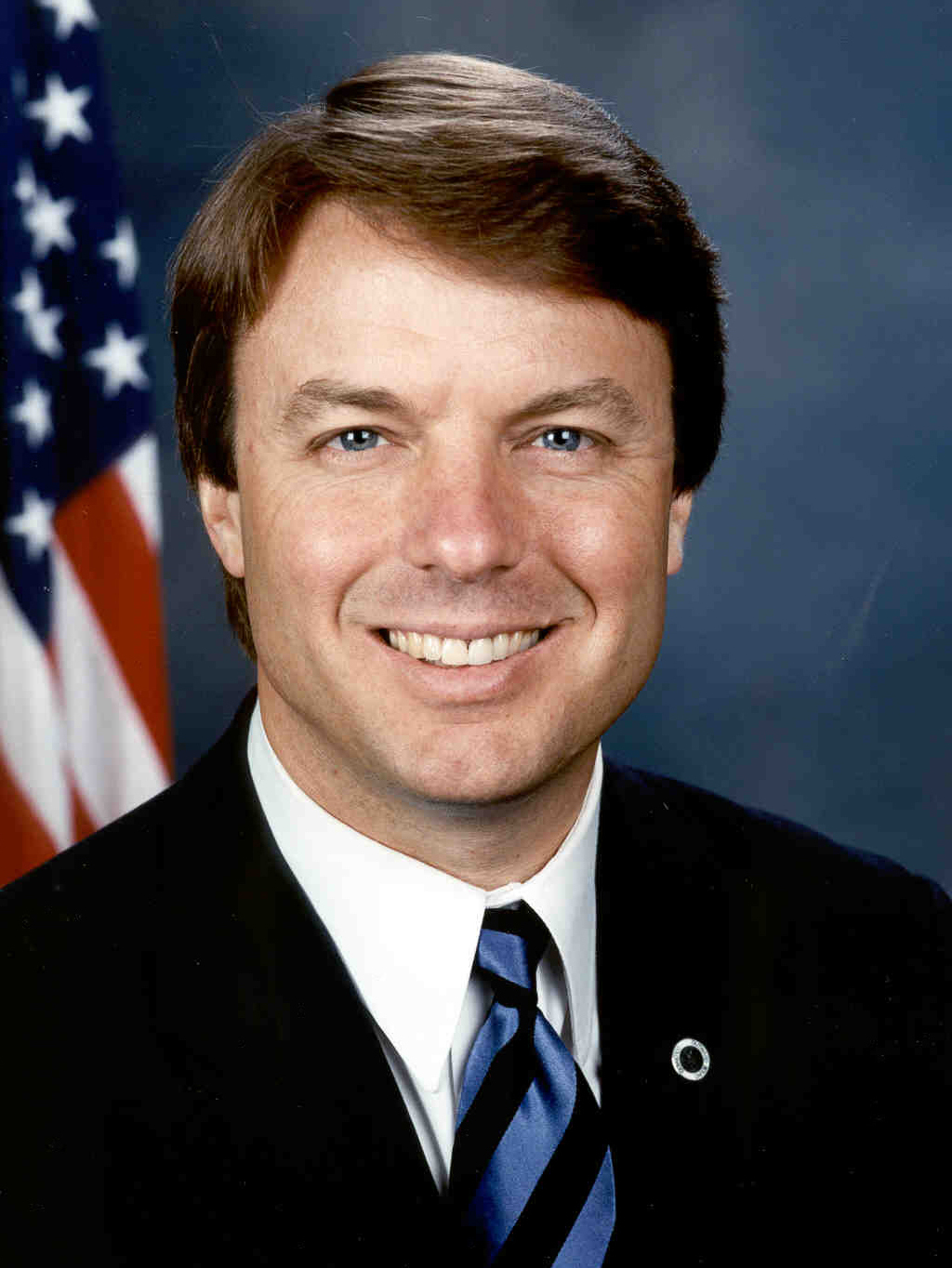
Senator John Edwards

== 2002 ==
=== May 2002 ===
- May 31 – Vermont Governor Howard Dean forms a presidential exploratory committee.

=== December 2002 ===
- December 1 – John F. Kerry, U.S. Senator from Massachusetts, announces his plans to form an exploratory committee for a possible 2004 presidential run on NBC's Meet The Press. Kerry anticipates a formal announcement "down the road some months".
- December 16 – Former U.S. Vice President and 2000 U.S. presidential candidate Al Gore announces on the CBS program 60 Minutes that he will not seek election to the presidency in 2004. Gore had recently wrapped up a nationwide book tour, as well as an appearance on NBC's Saturday Night Live, and had been widely expected to run. U.S. Senator Joe Lieberman from Connecticut, Gore's 2000 vice presidential running mate, had previously promised not to run should Gore seek their party's nomination.

== 2003 ==
=== January 2003 ===
- January 2 – U.S. Senator John Edwards from North Carolina announces formation of an exploratory committee for the Democratic nomination.
- January 4 – U.S. Representative Dick Gephardt from Missouri, who was Minority Leader of the U.S. House of Representatives from 1995 until late 2002 when he stepped down largely in anticipation for a bid for the presidency, announces his intention to run for the Democratic nomination.
- January 5 – Reverend Al Sharpton of New York announces his intention to run for the Democratic nomination.
- January 7 – Tom Daschle, the U.S. Minority Leader, announces that he will not run for president in 2004. Daschle had been widely expected to run.
- January 13 – U.S. Senator Joe Lieberman from Connecticut announces his intention to run for the Democratic nomination.
- January 17 – Libertarian Gary Nolan, former syndicated talk radio host, files papers to form an exploratory committee for a presidential run and announces his candidacy.
- January 22 – A campaign to draft Apple Computer Inc. CEO Steve Jobs is launched at http://www.jobs4president.org/. The site was announced on Slashdot, overloading the server within ten minutes. Before the owners of the site could bring the site back up, Jobs declines interest in running.

=== February 2003 ===
- February 18 – Carol Moseley Braun, former U.S. Senator from Illinois, announces her intention to run for the Democratic nomination.
- February 19 – Dennis Kucinich, U.S. Representative from Ohio, files papers to form an exploratory committee for a presidential run.
- February 27 – U.S. Senator Bob Graham from Florida announced his candidacy.

=== March 2003 ===
- March 3 – U.S. Senator Christopher Dodd from Connecticut announces that he will not run for the 2004 Democratic party presidential nomination.
- March 22 – The U.S. and the United Kingdom begin their shock-and-awe campaign with a massive air strike on military targets in Baghdad using cruise missiles fired from U.S. Navy warships, Royal Navy submarines and B-52 bombers; and laser guided missiles fired by Stealth Bombers.

=== April 2003 ===
- April 2 – Speaking before an audience in Peterborough, New Hampshire, John Kerry says "We need a regime change not just in Iraq. We need a regime change here in the United States." Republicans criticize Kerry for speaking out against a wartime president.
- April 17 – Democratic fundraising totals for the first quarter of 2003 are reported. John Edwards raises $7.4 million, John Kerry raises $7.0 million, Dick Gephardt raises $3.5 million, Joe Lieberman raises $3.0 million, Howard Dean raises $2.6 million, Bob Graham raises $1.1 million, and Dennis Kucinich and Carol Moseley Braun raise less than $1 million each.

=== May 2003 ===
- May 1 – George W. Bush lands on the aircraft carrier USS Abraham Lincoln, in a Lockheed S-3 Viking, where he gives a speech announcing the end of major combat in the Iraq war. Clearly visible in the background is a banner stating "Mission Accomplished". Bush's landing is criticized by opponents as overly theatrical and expensive. The banner, made by White House personnel (according to a CNN story:) and placed there by the U.S. Navy, is criticized as premature. Nonetheless, Bush's approval rating in the month of May rides at 66%, according to a CNN-USA Today-Gallup poll. This event would come back to haunt Bush as combat in Iraq continued.
- May 3 – Democrats meet at the University of South Carolina, located in Columbia, South Carolina, in the first formal debate between the nine challengers for the 2004 Democratic party presidential nomination. The candidates disagree on the war against Iraq, health insurance, and even President Bush's tax cuts, but unite in criticizing Bush's handling of the economy.
- May 6 – Gary Hart, former Senator from Colorado, announces he will not seek the Democratic nomination for president in 2004.
- May 7 – U.S. Vice President Dick Cheney announces he will be President Bush's running mate again in 2004. Cheney's position on the ticket had been the subject of some speculation because he has had four heart attacks, though none as vice president. Bush had still not formally announced he would seek re-election yet.
- May 16 – President Bush formally files papers with the Federal Election Commission seeking a second term as U.S. President.

=== June 2003 ===
- June 17 – Howard Dean airs the first television advertising of the 2004 campaign. The two-week ad campaign will cost more than $300,000.
- June 23 – Howard Dean formally announces that he is running for president, filing to form a presidential election campaign with the FEC.
- June 23 – U.S. Supreme Court upholds affirmative action in university admissions in Grutter v. Bollinger
- June 24 – Liberal advocacy website MoveOn holds the first-ever online Democratic "primary", which lasts just over 48 hours. It is an unofficial and non-binding affair, but with important symbolic and financial value. Of 317,647 votes, Howard Dean receives 44%, Dennis Kucinich 24%, and John Kerry 16%. Had any candidate received 50% of the vote, the candidate would have received MoveOn's endorsement and financial support. Instead, MoveOn supports all the candidates.
- June 26 – U.S. Supreme Court rules sodomy laws unconstitutional in Lawrence v. Texas

=== July 2003 ===
- July 3 – Democratic fundraising numbers for the second quarter of 2003 are reported and announced. Howard Dean surprises many raising $7.6 million, John Kerry raises $5.9 million, while John Edwards and Joe Lieberman raise roughly $5 million each.
- July 14 – Edie Bukewihge, Democrat, formally filed papers with the Federal Election Commission seeking a first term as president.
- July 18 – David Cobb announces his candidacy for the Green Party nomination in Washington, D.C. As part of a "genuine effort to reach progressives across party lines", he announces that his strategy includes a "Strategic States Plan", concentrating efforts where Electoral College votes are not "in play." Some Greens decry the lack of an "all-out" strategy from Cobb and the loss of ballot status that would ensue.

=== August 2003 ===
- August 11 – U.S. Senator Joe Biden from Delaware announces he will not seek the Democratic nomination, saying his campaign would be "a long shot" and that he could wield the most influence in the Senate.

=== September 2003 ===
- September 16 – John Edwards officially announces his candidacy on The Daily Show with Jon Stewart
- September 17 – retired General Wesley Clark announces his candidacy, bringing the number of Democratic presidential candidates currently in the running to the maximum of ten. This lasts until October 6.
- September 20 – Occupation of Iraq: Two American soldiers are killed and 13 wounded in a mortar attack in Abu Ghraib, and another soldier dies in a roadside attack in Ramadi, bringing the number of U.S. deaths since the war began to 304, of which 165 occurred after President Bush's "mission accomplished" statement of May 1. A member of the Governing Council, Dr. Aquila al-Hashimi, is shot in an assassination attempt (she dies five days later). United Nations Secretary-General Kofi Annan strongly condemns the attack and warns that it only undermines the country's political progress. George Bush's approval rating slides down to 50% according to a CNN.com poll, the lowest number since taking office
- September 25 – The Natural Law Party endorses Dennis Kucinich for president.

=== October 2003 ===
- October 6 – Bob Graham announces on Larry King Live that he is ending his presidential campaign.
- October 15 – Howard Dean files FEC DISCLOSURE FORM for the third quarter of 2003, reporting contributions of over $14.8 million. John Kerry reports a total of just over $4.0 million. Other candidates report smaller totals.
- October 22 – Ralph Nader removes his name from the California Green Party presidential primary ballot.
- October 28 – In a press conference President Bush says the following about the May 1 "Mission Accomplished" banner on the USS Abraham Lincoln: "The 'Mission Accomplished' sign, of course, was put up by the members of the USS Abraham Lincoln, saying that their mission was accomplished. I know it was attributed somehow to some ingenious advance man from my staff they weren't that ingenious, by the way."
- October 28 – In an interview, President Bush said the following after massive attacks on US and Iraq police forces in Iraq: "The more successful we are on the ground, the more these killers will react", Bush said as he sat in the White House's Oval Office with L. Paul Bremer, the U.S. administrator in Iraq. He added: "The more progress we make on the ground, the more free the Iraqis become, the more electricity is available, the more jobs are available, the more kids that are going to school, the more desperate these killers become, because they can't stand the thought of a free society."

=== November 2003 ===
- November 1 – In an interview with The Des Moines Register, Howard Dean is quoted as saying "I still want to be the candidate for guys with Confederate flags in their pickup trucks. We can't beat George Bush unless we appeal to a broad cross-section of Democrats." This comment stirs strong controversy among Democratic contenders.
- November 18 – George W. Bush makes a state visit to London in the midst of massive protests against him.

=== December 2003 ===
- December 9 – Former Vice President Al Gore endorses Howard Dean.
- December 13 – Saddam Hussein, former President of Iraq captured in Tikrit by the U.S. 4th Infantry Division. George W. Bush's approval rating spikes to 63% as a result, with 34% disapproving, according to a CNN/USA Today/Gallup Poll.
- December 17 – A CBS News/New York Times poll of likely Democratic primary voters shows Howard Dean getting 23% of the vote, with Wesley Clark at 10%, Joe Lieberman at 10%, Richard Gephardt at 6%, Al Sharpton at 5%, John Kerry at 4%, John Edwards at 2%, Carol Moseley-Braun at 1%, Dennis Kucinich at 1%, and the remaining 28% undecided.
- December 23 – Ben Manski, co-chairman of the Green Party, announces that Ralph Nader will not run as a Green, but may run as an independent.

== 2004 ==
=== January 2004 ===
- January 7 – George W. Bush's campaign manager Ken Mehlman announces that the President's re-election campaign raised $130.8 million from 494,000 individual donors during 2003. 415,000 of the 494,000 Bush donors contributed less than $200 each. Reportedly, the goal is to raise between $150 million and $170 million by the mid-summer conventions.
- January 13 – The non-binding Washington, D.C., Democratic primary is held with four major candidates on the ballot. Howard Dean received 43% of the vote, while Al Sharpton had 34%. Carol Moseley Braun was in third place with 12% followed by Dennis Kucinich who had eight percent. The primary, however, was binding upon the Green Party, making it the Greens' first primary of the season. David Cobb received 37 percent of the vote, Sheila Bilyeu received 19 percent, 13 percent preferred the party not run a candidate, and the remaining 31 percent was distributed among write-in candidates.
- January 15 – Saying she was proud of "breaking new ground" in her presidential bid, Carol Moseley Braun drops out of the race and endorses Howard Dean.
- January 18 – Howard Dean visits Plains, Georgia to meet with former President Jimmy Carter. Carter makes a statement in a press conference following a church service the two men attended: "I have made an announcement in advance that I'm not going to endorse any particular candidate. But I have been particularly grateful at the courageous and outspoken posture and position that Governor Dean has taken from the very beginning."
- January 19 – Iowa caucus results: The Iowa caucuses yield unexpectedly strong results for Democratic candidates John Kerry, who earns 38% of the state's delegates and John Edwards, who takes 32%. Former front-runner Howard Dean slips to 18% and third-place, and Richard Gephardt finishes fourth (11%). Dennis Kucinich and Al Sharpton received minimal support; Joe Lieberman and Wesley Clark had opted not to participate in the Iowa caucuses.
- January 20 – Following his disappointing showing in Iowa, Dick Gephardt drops out of the presidential race to return to private life following the expiration of his congressional term in 2005.
- January 22 – Howard Dean gives an interview to Diane Sawyer in an attempt to repair his image following the disappointing loss in Iowa, and to control the damage caused by his post-caucus speech, which was widely criticized and ridiculed as the "I have a scream" speech. Sawyer and many others in the national broadcast news media later expressed some regret about overplaying the story after it becomes clear that audio engineering played a role in his speech sounding so bad.
- January 27 – John Kerry wins the New Hampshire primary with 38.4% of the vote. Howard Dean finishes second with 26.4%, Wesley Clark third with 12.4%, John Edwards fourth with 12.0%, and Joe Lieberman receives 8.6%.
- January 29 – First presidential debate for Green Party candidates, at Harvard University in Cambridge, Massachusetts, between David Cobb, Kent Mesplay, and Lorna Salzman.
- January 31 – David Cobb wins the Ohio Green primary, partially conducted online, with 39% of the vote. Peter Camejo comes in second with 21%, and Lorna Salzman places third, with 13.5%. Ralph Nader, Paul Glover, Kent Mesplay, and Dennis Kucinich place fourth through seventh respectively, with single-digit percentages.

=== February 2004 ===
- February 3 – Mini-Tuesday
  - John Kerry wins the Missouri, Arizona, and Delaware primaries and New Mexico and North Dakota caucuses. John Edwards takes South Carolina. Wesley Clark wins Oklahoma with several hundred more votes than Edwards.
  - After failing to win any primary or caucus to date, Joe Lieberman drops out of the presidential race to return to the United States Senate.
- February 7 – John Kerry wins the Michigan and Washington caucuses. This earns him over 130 delegates. Howard Dean places second in both caucuses, gaining just over 50 delegates.
- February 8 – John Kerry wins the Maine caucuses. Howard Dean places second, while Dennis Kucinich has his strongest showing yet with 16% of the vote.
- February 10 – John Kerry wins the Tennessee and Virginia primaries with 41% and 52% of the vote respectively. John Edwards places second with 27% of the vote in Virginia and 26% in Tennessee. All other candidates perform very poorly, save Wesley Clark, who places third in both states gaining 23% of the vote in Tennessee, but only 9% in Virginia. Clark withdraws from the race.
- February 12 – Wesley Clark endorses John Kerry.
- February 14 – John Kerry wins caucuses in Washington, D.C., with 47% and Nevada with 63% of the vote. Howard Dean attracts nearly twice as many voters in each race as John Edwards taking second place in Nevada (17% vs 10%) and third in Washington, D.C. (18% vs 10%) close behind Al Sharpton with 20%. 6,000 Democrats show up at the caucus in Las Vegas, Nevada, far more than the expected 1,000, forcing the caucus to be held outside on the high school's football field.
- February 14 – Dr. Jonathan Farley announces his candidacy for the Green Party nomination for president.
- February 17 – John Kerry wins the Wisconsin primary with 40% of the vote. John Edwards places second with 34% and Howard Dean a distant third with 18%. Other candidates receive 3% or less.
- February 18 – Howard Dean ends campaign.
- February 20 – John Kerry, Congressman Bernie Sanders (I-VT), DNC chairman Terry McAuliffe, Democratic Party strategist Dane Strother, and The Nation periodical urge Ralph Nader not to run for president, believing he is to blame for Al Gore's defeat in the 2000 election.
- February 22 – Former Green Party candidate Ralph Nader announces on NBC's Meet the Press his decision to run for president as an independent, saying, "there's too much power and wealth in too few hands."
- February 24 – John Kerry decisively wins 31 delegates in Utah, Hawaii, and Idaho. John Edwards wins a total of 9 delegates for second place in Utah and Idaho while Dennis Kucinich wins 8 delegates for second place in Hawaii.

=== March 2004 ===
- March 2 – John Kerry wins decisive victories in the California, Connecticut, Georgia, Maryland, Massachusetts, New York, Ohio, and Rhode Island primaries and the Minnesota caucuses. Howard Dean wins the primary in his home state of Vermont. John Edwards announces his intention to leave the race the following day; President Bush calls Senator Kerry to congratulate him. Coverage of Edwards' pending withdrawal hits the airwaves just as the Minnesota caucuses open (7 p.m. CST) and three hours before the California primaries close.
- March 3 – John Edwards announces his exit from the race and endorses Kerry.
- March 5 –
  - The Independence Party of Minnesota tabulates results of an instant-runoff straw poll and finds John Edwards to be the winner.
  - Outcry at the use of footage of the aftermath of the 9/11 terrorist attacks in Republican presidential campaign adverts.
- March 9 – President Bush wins the number of delegates needed to be nominated at the 2004 Republican National Convention in August. Senator Kerry wins all four primaries, increasing his delegate total to 1,937 - 225 short of the 2,162 needed to clinch the nomination.
- March 11 – After meetings with superdelegates in Washington and with former opponents Howard Dean and John Edwards, John Kerry accumulated the 2,162 delegates required for nomination at the 2004 Democratic National Convention.
- March 12 – The New York Sun publishes an article alleging John Kerry's attendance at a November 12–15, 1971, meeting of the VVAW national coordinators in Kansas City, Missouri, where a plan to assassinate politicians who supported the Vietnam War was considered but rejected.
- March 13 – John Kerry wins the Kansas caucuses with 72% of the vote.
- March 13 – Kerry campaign spokesperson denies John Kerry attendance at VVAW Kansas City meeting.
- March 16 – John Kerry wins the Illinois primaries with 71% of the vote.
- March 19 – Kerry campaign concedes Kerry may have attended 1971 VVAW Kansas City meeting.
- March 20 – John Kerry wins the Wyoming and Alaska caucuses with 77 and 48 percent of the vote, respectively.
- March 22 – President Bush's former chief counter-terrorism aide, Richard Clarke, releases a book documenting his experience under Bush and previous administrations. Though critical of previous administrations, controversy swirls around criticism of Bush for his handling of Al-Qaida before the September 11, 2001 attacks and for the 2003 invasion of Iraq. Clarke also testifies before the 9-11 Commission that week.
- March 25 – Howard Dean endorses John Kerry, citing Kerry's experience and vision, and emphasizing the importance of uniting Democratic voices behind Kerry to defeat President Bush.

=== April 2004 ===
- April 2 – Democratic Party offices in Scottsdale, Arizona, are broken into and vandalized. This follows a previous break-in during March, in which the only thing taken was a computer containing campaign and membership information.
- April 5 – Ralph Nader holds a rally in Oregon which needed 1000 registered voters to attend in order to get on the state's ballot as an independent. The rally attracts 741 people.
- April 29 – Photographs showing Iraqi prisoners in the Abu Ghraib prison outside Baghdad being abused and humiliated by U.S. soldiers spark outrage around the world.

=== May 2004 ===
- May 4 – Swift Boat Veterans for Truth hold Washington, D.C., press conference announcing their campaign to oppose the presidential candidacy of John Kerry.
- May 8 – Body of Nick Berg found in Iraq. Video of his beheading by terrorists is distributed a few days later and it sparks outrage around the world.
- May 10 – Amid calls for Secretary of Defense Donald Rumsfeld's resignation over Abu Ghraib prisoner abuse, President Bush issues a strong statement of support for Rumsfeld, saying that Rumsfeld is "doing a superb job" in the war on terrorism.
- May 15 – A Newsweek poll puts Bush's overall job approval at 42 percent. His approval for handling Iraq dips to 35 percent, compared with 44 percent in April. The poll also shows that in a two way matchup, John Kerry is chosen by 46 percent versus Bush at 45 percent.
- May 18 – In spite of a determined campaign, the remaining contender for the Democratic party nomination opposing Kerry, Dennis Kucinich, loses in the Oregon Primary, getting only 17% of the vote.
- May 22 – Michael Moore's film Fahrenheit 9/11 was awarded the Palme d'Or at the Cannes Film Festival. The film offers a critical look at the administration of George W. Bush and the war on terror.
- May 25 – Idaho primary.
- May 28–May 31 – At its national convention in Atlanta, the Libertarian Party nominates Michael Badnarik for president on the third ballot. Richard Campagna is nominated for vice-president.

=== June 2004 ===
- June 1 – Alabama, New Mexico, and South Dakota primaries.
- June 5 – Former president Ronald Reagan dies. Kerry suspends campaigning out of respect until after state funeral.
- June 8 – Montana and New Jersey primaries.
- June 10 – A Bush-Cheney headquarters in Knoxville, Tennessee was hit by two gunshots, apparently by a passing vehicle. Two glass doors are shattered. No one is injured.
- June 11 – Bush and Kerry do not run campaign ads out of respect for Reagan to mark his state funeral, which they both attended.
- June 23 – Constitution Party National Convention begins in Valley Forge, Pennsylvania. Green Party of the United States National Convention begins in Milwaukee, Wisconsin.
- June 25 – Green Party of the United States nominates David Cobb for president on the second ballot.
- June 25 – Constitution Party nominates Michael Peroutka for president.
- June 25 – Fahrenheit 9/11 opens in theaters. It breaks the record for highest opening-weekend earnings in the United States for a "documentary", earning US$23.9 million. (Box Office Mojo).
- June 26 – Ralph Nader holds a second convention in Portland to put his name on the presidential ballot in Oregon. This attempt is supported by conservative groups who hope his name will draw votes in this swing state from Democratic hopeful John Kerry. While 943 forms were collected, and many forms had more than one signature on them, the state elections board later rules that there were insufficient valid signatures to place Nader on the November ballot.
- June 27 – Constitution Party National Convention concludes.
- June 28 – Green Party National Convention concludes.

=== July 2004 ===
- July 1 – Supporters of Ralph Nader abandon their effort to place his name on the Arizona ballot. The Democratic party had filed a lawsuit in Maricopa County Superior Court, where arguments were scheduled to be heard Friday.
- July 6 – John Kerry selects John Edwards as his running mate.
- July 9 – Howard Dean debates Ralph Nader on the role of third parties in the 2004 election.
- July 12 – The Department of Homeland Security asks the Justice Department's office of legal counsel to research on the legal requirements for postponing the November elections, stating that they are concerned that terrorists might disrupt the elections. Financial Times, London
- July 26–29 – 2004 Democratic National Convention in Boston, Massachusetts. John Kerry is nominated for president, and John Edwards is nominated for vice president.
- July 30–August 1 – Reform Party National Convention in Columbus, Ohio. Ralph Nader is nominated for president and Peter Camejo is nominated for vice president.

=== August 2004 ===
- August 5 – An advocacy group called Swift Boat Veterans for Truth debuts an ad calling into question John Kerry's account of how he earned his Purple Heart medals in Vietnam.
- August 18 – Magazine publisher Deal W. Hudson, a Republican adviser and a key figure in the attempt to win Catholic support and question the morality of John Kerry's policies and voting record, resigns from the Bush campaign over an impending sex scandal.
- August 21 – Bush's campaign staff dismisses Kenneth Cordier as an adviser to the campaign for appearing in an ad sponsored by Swift Boat Veterans for Truth.
- August 24 – Kerry appears on The Daily Show with Jon Stewart in his first television interview after the Swift Boat Veterans for Truth ad controversy flared up. The Daily Show's emerging role in the 2004 election as a comedy show remains a continuing controversy among conventional journalists.
- August 25 – Benjamin Ginsberg, who served as the head lawyer for President Bush's re-election campaign, resigns. Ginsberg acknowledged he advised Swift Boat Veterans for Truth.
- August 30–September 2 – The 2004 Republican National Convention is held in New York City. President Bush and Vice President Cheney are renominated for their current positions.

=== September 2004 ===
- September 2 – Oregon Secretary of State Bill Bradbury announces that Ralph Nader's supporters failed to obtain enough signatures to qualify for the November ballot in that state; Nader's Oregon supporters file an appeal. Nader also suffered courtroom defeats in Texas and Michigan to gain ballot access in those states. However, Nader supporters were able to obtain almost double the 1,000 signatures needed to be placed on the Washington state ballot.
- September 2 – A shot is fired at 10:30 p.m. at a Huntington, West Virginia, Republican Party headquarters during Bush's acceptance speech. One person is slightly wounded by flying glass.
- September 5 – "Unfit for Command" reaches #1 on The New York Times "Best Seller" list (non-fiction)
- September 6 – Kerry appoints John Sasso as his new campaign manager.
- September 8 – Killian memos: The CBS News program 60 Minutes II announces the alleged discovery of newly uncovered records of Bush's service in the Air National Guard. Supporters of Democratic candidate Kerry conclude (1) that the records show then Lieutenant Bush disobeyed orders and (2) that the Bush campaign has lied about having made all such records public. The memos' authenticity is quickly questioned on numerous blogs.
- September 9 –
  - A state judge in Florida denies Ralph Nader a place on that state ballot as the Reform Party candidate.
  - However, in Oregon, Marion County judge Paul Lipscomb rules that Secretary of State Bill Bradbury exceeded his authority and orders Ralph Nader's name placed on the Oregon ballot. Bradbury's staff announces they will appeal the decision.
- September 11 – Bush and Kerry neither campaign, nor run campaign ads to mark the third anniversary of September 11 terrorist attacks. Kerry cites that 9/11 brought the country together. Bush's entire weekly radio address, broadcast live on radio and television across the country, was devoted to the anniversary. With him when he gave his radio address from the White House were some of the relatives of the victims, including former solicitor general Ted Olson, who lost his wife, Barbara, on American Flight 77, which crashed into the Pentagon.
- September 15 – Killian memos: John Killian's former secretary, Marian Carr Knox, says that the memos are forgeries but that their content is true and accurately reflects Killian's view of George W. Bush.
- September 17 – Laura Bush's speech at a firehouse in Hamilton Township, Mercer County, New Jersey is disrupted by anti-war campaigner Sue Niederer.
- September 17 – A Republican campaigner, Phil Parlock, and his daughter were assaulted at a public appearance by John Edwards in Huntington, West Virginia. It was later revealed that he repeatedly attended Democratic rallies in the past to provoke responses from Democratic party supporters, and brought his young children along to hold signs. In one instance he held up a sign reading "Vince Foster", insinuating that Bill Clinton had him murdered.
- September 17 – Republican National Committee Chairman Ed Gillespie says that he has no knowledge of a campaign flier mailed in West Virginia that charges unnamed "liberals" with wanting to ban the Bible. The flier is denounced by such organizations as People for the American Way () and The Interfaith Alliance ().
- September 18 – The Florida Supreme Court orders that Reform Party candidate Ralph Nader be included on the ballot in Florida for the upcoming election.
- September 20 – Judges in Arkansas and New Mexico issue rulings in both states denying Ralph Nader access to the ballot in those states; his supporters say they will appeal those rulings. The Maryland Court of Appeals orders election officials to accept 542 previously rejected petition signatures, which qualified Nader as a candidate in that state.
- September 20 – Killian memos: CBS News admits that it cannot prove the authenticity of the documents and that airing the story was a "mistake" that CBS regretted. The source for the documents is named as Bill Burkett, and Burkett admits to having lied to CBS about how he got them.
- September 22 – the Washington Note reveals that the text of a Republican flier mailed in West Virginia, which charged liberals with wanting to ban the Bible, was also used for a flier in Arkansas, and concludes that "this template, which [RNC Chair] Ed Gillespie said he knew nothing about, is being used in multiple states."
- September 23 – the Republican National Committee admits that it was the source of mass mailings of fliers warning that the Bible would be banned if "Liberal politicians" were elected.
- September 25 – Teresa Heinz Kerry crosses swords with a Republican at a question-and-answer session in Pueblo, Colorado.
- September 26 – Ohio Secretary of State J. Kenneth Blackwell issues an order to state election boards that only voter registration forms printed on 80 lb. paper can be accepted as valid. This sparks a controversy, and within a few days Blackwell reverses his order to enforce this obscure requirement. (Columbus Dispatch)
- September 28 –
  - The New Mexico Supreme Court overturns a lower court ruling and allows Ralph Nader to run as an independent in that state.
  - George Bush's hometown newspaper, the Crawford, Texas Lone Star Iconoclast, endorses Democratic presidential candidate John Kerry. The editorial asks Texan voters "not to rate the candidate by his hometown [...] but instead by where he intends to take the country." In the previous election, the paper had endorsed Bush. (Reuters) (Lone Star Iconoclast)
- September 30 –
  - The first Presidential debate is held between George W. Bush and John Kerry at the University of Miami, moderated by Jim Lehrer of PBS. Though originally intended to focus on domestic policy, the war on terror, questions are asked on the War in Iraq and America's international relations. Later, a consensus forms among mainstream pollsters and pundits that Kerry has won the debate decisively, strengthening what had come to be seen as a weak and troubled campaign.
  - The Iraq Survey Group, headed by Charles A. Duelfer release the Duelfer Report. Further to previous ISG reports, it concludes that Iraq had no weapons of mass destruction and that its nuclear capability had decayed, not advanced, since 1991. It claims that Saddam Hussein was able to mitigate some of the effects of the sanctions through corruption of the Oil for Food Program. It implicates France, Russia, and China as helping Saddam thwart the sanctions. Many newspapers report that it is damning to the president's case on Iraq, but others claim that it supports the president's claim.

=== October 2004 ===
- October 1 –
  - Using grass killer, vandals burn an 8 by 8 foot swastika into the lawn of a Madison, Wisconsin Bush supporter. Police investigate the incident as a hate crime.
  - Republican Party officials in Nevada are accused of voter registration fraud. The FBI is contacted after 15 complaints are made to the registrar for Washoe County, Nevada. Several voter registration contractors are fired.
  - The day after the first Presidential debate, polling and pundits indicate that John Kerry won the 90-minute verbal contest
- October 2 – Three laptops are stolen from a Bush-Cheney headquarters office in Bellevue, Washington. Though police say the theft does not appear to be politically motivated, Republican Party chair Chris Vance compares the action to Watergate. The laptops contained information on GOTV efforts. State Democratic Party spokespeople condemn the theft.
- October 5 –
  - Vice Presidential debate held between Dick Cheney and John Edwards in Cleveland, Ohio, moderated by Gwen Ifill of PBS. Described by an unidentified New York columnist as "Darth Vader versus Robin" and again focusing on Iraq and the war on terror, the televised contest attracts more Republican viewers than Democrats and an initial poll by ABC indicates a victory for Cheney, while polls by CNN and MSNBC give it to Edwards. (BBC), (SF Chronicle) (ABC)
  - At local Bush–Cheney headquarters across the nation, union members take part in AFL–CIO-coordinated protests of new federal restrictions on overtime pay. In Orlando, protesters injure two Bush supporters, and draw horns and mustaches on pictures of Bush. Roughly a dozen protesters force their way into a Bush-Cheney headquarters in St. Paul, Minnesota. Similar protests are reported in roughly 20 cities, including Milwaukee, Wisconsin, and Detroit, Michigan. Republicans compare these activities to those of the brown shirts.
  - The Log Cabin Republicans accuse the Bush-Cheney campaign of vilifying homosexuals.
- October 6 – With Dick Cheney having accidentally directed viewers of the Vice-Presidential debate to visit 'factcheck.com' instead of 'factcheck.org' (a website which attempts to debunk allegedly false facts in U.S. politics, including claims made about Halliburton), the company that owns the erroneously linked website redirects it to George Soros's website entitled 'Why we must not re-elect President Bush: a personal message from George Soros'. (Slate)
- October 8 –
  - A source reports that Michael Moore is in talks with iN Demand Networks, a pay-TV distributor, to air his controversial film, "Fahrenheit 9/11", before the November 2 election. Reuters
  - Second Presidential debate, held at Washington University in St. Louis, moderated by Charles Gibson of ABC. Conducted in a "town meeting" format, less formal than the first Presidential debate, this debate sees President Bush and Senator Kerry taking questions on a variety of subjects from a local audience.
  - Libertarian Party nominee Michael Badnarik and Green Party nominee David Cobb are both arrested while trying to serve court papers on the Commission on Presidential Debates organizers.
- October 9 –
  - Afghanistan holds the first democratic election for president of its country. Pundits say that this will help Bush's campaign.
  - The day after the second Presidential debate, pictures of an apparent hump on George Bush's back lead to speculation that he was wearing a radio receiver and being fed answers.
  - Australian Prime Minister John Howard wins an unprecedented fourth term, despite widespread opposition to Australia's involvement in the Iraq war. Domestic issues, including a strong economy and fears of interest rate increases, dominate the election.
- October 10 –
  - The New York Times Magazine publishes an interview with John Kerry. This quote is used by the Bush campaign to attack Kerry by claiming he is weak on terrorism, and used by Bush in the debate on October 13: "We have to get back to the place we were, where terrorists are not the focus of our lives, but they're a nuisance. As a former law-enforcement person, I know we're never going to end prostitution. We're never going to end illegal gambling. But we're going to reduce it, organized crime, to a level where it isn't on the rise. It isn't threatening people's lives every day, and fundamentally, it's something that you continue to fight, but it's not threatening the fabric of your life."
  - Bush-Cheney campaign headquarters in Spokane, Washington are broken into. Petty cash is stolen, and a TV and computer are targeted, but are left behind, presumably because the burglars were startled. Though this is the second break-in of Bush-Cheney headquarters in the state in as many weeks, police doubt the burglary is politically motivated.
  - Bush administration is criticised for filming a promotional ad in the style of a news story.
  - Bush-Cheney headquarters in Canton, Ohio are broken into, looted, and vandalized.
  - The New York Times publishes its book review on "Unfit for Command".
- October 11 –
  - Republican nominee for State House District 82 in Tennessee, Dave Dahl, accuses incumbent Democrat Craig Fitzhugh of distributing a flier portraying voting for George W. Bush as "retarded." But the man Dahl points to as being able to prove the accusation cannot do so, saying only that "someone" got the flier from "somebody." Tennessee Democratic Party chairman Randy Button calls the accusation "dirty politics", and charges that the flier was planted in Fitzhugh's campaign office.
  - The Sinclair Broadcasting Group orders its 62 television stations – many of them in battleground states – to air Stolen Honor: Wounds that Never Heal two weeks before the election. The documentary attacks Senator Kerry's testimony before the Fulbright Hearing in 1971, claiming his statements were untrue and led to increased suffering by American soldiers held as prisoners of war by the North Vietnamese. Eighteen Democratic senators oppose the showing, and ask the FCC to rule that Kerry is entitled to equal time. FCC Commissioner Michael J. Copps comes out against the broadcast, saying, "This is an abuse of the public trust." On Fox News' "Dayside with Linda Vester" the next day, Kerry campaign spokesman Chad Clanton accused Sinclair of "obliterating every decent journalistic standard in the book." He also said of Sinclair: "I think they're going to regret this. They better hope we don't win." Sinclair is known for supporting President Bush, and in April refused to broadcast an episode of Nightline that reported on American military casualties in Iraq, for fear that it would hurt the Republican campaign.,
  - In a speech at Newton, Ohio, Vice-Presidential candidate John Edwards claims embryonic stem cell research could mean that "people like Christopher Reeve are going to [...] get up out of that wheelchair and walk again", and criticizes the Bush White House for not supporting such research. The recently deceased Reeve had supported embryonic stem cell research and the Kerry-Edwards campaign.
  - Bush-Cheney '04 Campaign Chairman, Governor Marc Racicot, sends a letter to AFL–CIO president John Sweeney protesting union activities that he claims have led to injuries, property damage, vandalism, and "voter intimidation" at Bush-Cheney '04 and Republican Party offices around the country.
- October 12 –
  - Senate Majority Leader Bill Frist (R), says that John Edwards' recent claims about Stem Cell Research may give false hope, branding them "shameful" and "crass." Frist is a medical doctor.
  - A former employee of Voters Outreach of America, operating in the state of Nevada, alleges that the group, after collecting voter registration forms, submitted the Republican forms but shredded the Democratic ones; the Republican National Committee admits having hired Voters Outreach of America but condemns fraud.
  - Democratic Party offices in Toledo, Ohio are broken into, and computers containing campaign information are stolen.
  - RNC Chairman Ed Gillespie threatens MTV's "Rock the Vote" campaign with legal action for raising the possibility of a military draft. Gillespie argues that since a possible draft is an "urban myth" denied by "no less than the President of the United States", Rock the Vote's mention of the issue jeopardizes its non-profit status. MTV labels Gillespie's threat as censorship, and replies that "Just because President Bush, Vice President Cheney, and Secretary Rumsfeld, and for that matter Senator Kerry, say that there is not going to be a draft does not make it so."
- October 13 –
  - Thomas Lipscomb's "Mystery Surrounds Kerry's Navy Discharge" article appears on the front page of The New York Sun. The article speculates about possible Nixon administration attempts to deprive Kerry of an honorable discharge from the Navy.
  - The National Rifle Association of America endorses President Bush, promising millions of dollars for ads, phone banks and other get-out-the-vote efforts on his behalf.
  - Bush and Kerry meet for the third and final debate at Arizona State University. Transcript and Video
    - 51 million viewers watch the debate. Only 15.2 million viewers tune in to watch the Major League Baseball championship games broadcast simultaneously.
    - Photos taken after the third presidential debate fuel the "Bush bulge" theory, which started with photos taken during the second presidential debate, that the President was wearing a radio receiver and was fed his lines.
    - In answering a debate question about whether homosexuality is a choice, Kerry says "If you were to talk to Dick Cheney's daughter, who is a lesbian, she would tell you that she's being who she was, she's being who she was born as." Although Mary Cheney is open about her sexuality (she is "out"), Kerry's remarks upset mother Lynne Cheney. She says, "[Kerry] is not a good man. What a cheap and tawdry political trick." AP
  - Oregon Secretary of State Bill Bradbury and Attorney General Hardy Myers announce an investigation into allegations that Voters Outreach of America might have destroyed voter registration forms of potential Democrats.
  - On ABC's Nightline, Ted Koppel broadcasts interviews with Vietnamese who say they were engaged with John Kerry during the Vietnam War. The interviews cast further doubt on the truth of accusations from the Swift Boat Veterans for Truth. Koppel also interviews SVBT head John O'Neill, who charges that Koppel trusts Communist Viet Cong veterans more than the American veterans who make up SVBT.
- October 14 –
  - Following the announcement in Oregon, Nevada also announces an investigation into claims that voter registration forms of potential Democrats were destroyed.
  - The Drudge Report posts a page from a Democratic Party field manual, which reads in part that "[i]f no signs of [Republican] intimidation techniques have emerged yet, launch a 'preemptive strike'" to stave off any such attempts. The Democratic Party web site argues that the Drudge has "unfairly characterized" the manual, and posts a fuller excerpt from the manual's section on "How to Organize to Prevent and Combat Voter Intimidation." DNC Website
  - Elizabeth Edwards, wife of Democratic vice-presidential candidate John Edwards, responds to Lynne Cheney's remarks about Kerry's comment on her daughter's homosexuality. Mrs. Edwards says, "I think that it indicates a certain degree of shame with respect to her daughter's sexual preferences."
  - Eighteen Democratic Party senators write the FCC requesting equal time in response to Sinclair's broadcast of "Stolen Honor: Wounds that Never Heal." FCC chairman Michael Powell denies that Sinclair's broadcast violates equal time provisions, and responds only that the government will not block the broadcast.
  - In Colorado, voter registration fraud becomes a concern as paid voter registration gatherers flood the state. One Coloradan tells local TV that he had registered to vote "about 35 times" after repeated encounters with registration gatherers. ACORN, whose registration gatherers are linked to similar cases in Ohio and Florida, cooperates with Colorado authorities to trace hundreds of questionable registrations. But ACORN Western regional director Jim Fleischmann argues that local media are making too much of the issue: "Registration fraud is different than voter fraud. Just because you register someone 35 times doesn't mean they get to vote 35 times. They can only vote once."
- October 15 –
  - Larry Russell joins the Bush-Cheney campaign in Ohio. Russell had recently resigned from his position as the South Dakota Republican party get-out-the-vote coordinator amid allegations of voter registration fraud. (AP)
  - Pay-TV distributor iN Demand Networks backs away from a deal to air Michael Moore's film, "Fahrenheit 9/11", alleging "legitimate business and legal concerns." The company also noted that "we regret that our decision has led Michael Moore to consider legal action against us", though they did make clear what legal action they were referring to. Yahoo
- October 17 – John Kerry receives the endorsement of The New York Times, the Boston Globe, and Minneapolis' Star Tribune. George W. Bush is endorsed by the Chicago Tribune, Denver's Rocky Mountain News, and The Dallas Morning News.
- October 18 –
  - George W. Bush visits New Jersey, a state that until recently was showing weak support for George W. Bush and strong support for John Kerry.
  - Rumors fly about John Kerry being excommunicated by the Catholic Church for his views on abortion.
  - George W. Bush denounces John Kerry's so-called "shameless scare tactics" calling it "wrong" and "old-style politics." Bush mentions Kerry's tactics of telling the elderly that if Bush is elected their Social Security checks will be canceled; telling black voters that their votes are being repressed by Republicans; and telling young people that a draft is imminent.
- October 19 – Early voting begins in Florida, as well as ten other states, including Texas. Fears have plagued Florida officials since the controversy during the 2000 election, leading to reforms in voting procedures. However, there are claims that electronic voting is unreliable, and there are reported cases of attempts to disenfranchise voters.
- October 20 –
  - The Vatican announces that John Kerry has not been excommunicated for his position on abortion rights.
  - Fox News publishes an article representing John Kerry's strategy to win the election. Strategies include declaring victory prematurely, and sending out six teams of so-called "SWAT teams" lawyers ready to fly out and fight legal and political battles in disputed states.
  - An uproar in the Bush camp is heard after Teresa Heinz Kerry, wife of John Kerry, questions whether Laura Bush, wife of George W. Bush, has "ever had a real job." Bush camp responds that Laura Bush has worked as a teacher and as a librarian, and that raising children is a job. Teresa Heinz Kerry agrees and apologizes.
  - Channel One News announces the results of a mock presidential election. George W. Bush wins 393 electoral votes and John Kerry won 145. Over 1.4 million teens voted.
- October 21 –
  - The legal team of Democratic contender John Kerry, as well as activist groups, have already filed a number of voting-related lawsuits in Florida challenging the voting process. Joe Garcia, of the New Democrat Network, says "there are quite literally armies of lawyers."
- October 22 –
  - South Dakota Attorney General Larry Long announces indictments of five former staffers of a GOP get-out-the-vote effort, under allegations of absentee ballot application fraud.
- October 25 –
  - Former President Bill Clinton makes his first public appearance following his Sep 6th heart bypass surgery at a Philadelphia rally for Democratic contender Kerry.
  - The Roman Catholic Church publishes a handbook intended to guide business, cultural, and political leaders in making decisions regarding social issues. The publication comes one week before the U.S. presidential election. In response to a journalist's question as to how Roman Catholics should vote, Vatican spokesman Joaquin Navarro-Valls says that "the Holy See never gets involved in electoral or political questions directly."
- October 26 –
  - Near Boynton Beach, Florida, Steven Soper drags his girlfriend, Stacey Silveira, into her house, throws her to the floor, spits on her, points a knife at her and threatens to kill her, because he learned that she planned to vote for Kerry. Soper later pleads guilty to false imprisonment, aggravated assault with a deadly weapon, battery and resisting arrest without violence.
  - Rapper Eminem releases a song entitled Mosh against Bush, and to encourage people to vote him out of office.
- October 27 –
  - The BBC reports that it has obtained a document from George W. Bush's Florida campaign headquarters containing a list of 1,886 names and addresses of voters in largely African-American and Democratic areas of Jacksonville, Florida. Democratic Party officials allege that the document is a "caging list" that the Bush campaign intends to use to issue mass challenges to African-American voters, in violation of federal law. (BBC)
- October 28 –
  - Election officials in Broward County, Florida report that over 50,000 absentee ballots for next Tuesday's U.S. presidential election are missing. Officials mailed 60,000 absentee ballots earlier this month, but only 2,000 were delivered. (BBC)
  - Iraq explosives issue: U.S. presidential candidates George W. Bush and John Kerry accuse each other regarding Monday's announcement by the International Atomic Energy Agency that 380 tons (345,000 kg) of explosives are missing from the Al Qa'qaa industrial facility in Iraq. (Japan Today)
- October 29 –
  - The 6th U.S. Circuit Court of Appeals blocked a Republican challenge to 20,000 voter registrations in Ohio.
  - A new video of Osama bin Laden is released, addressing the American people directly. bin Laden acknowledges responsibility for the September 11, 2001 attacks, criticizes President Bush, and notes to Americans that "Your security is not in the hands of Kerry or Bush or al-Qaida. Your security is in your own hands and each state which does not harm our security will remain safe." (CNN)

=== November 2004 ===
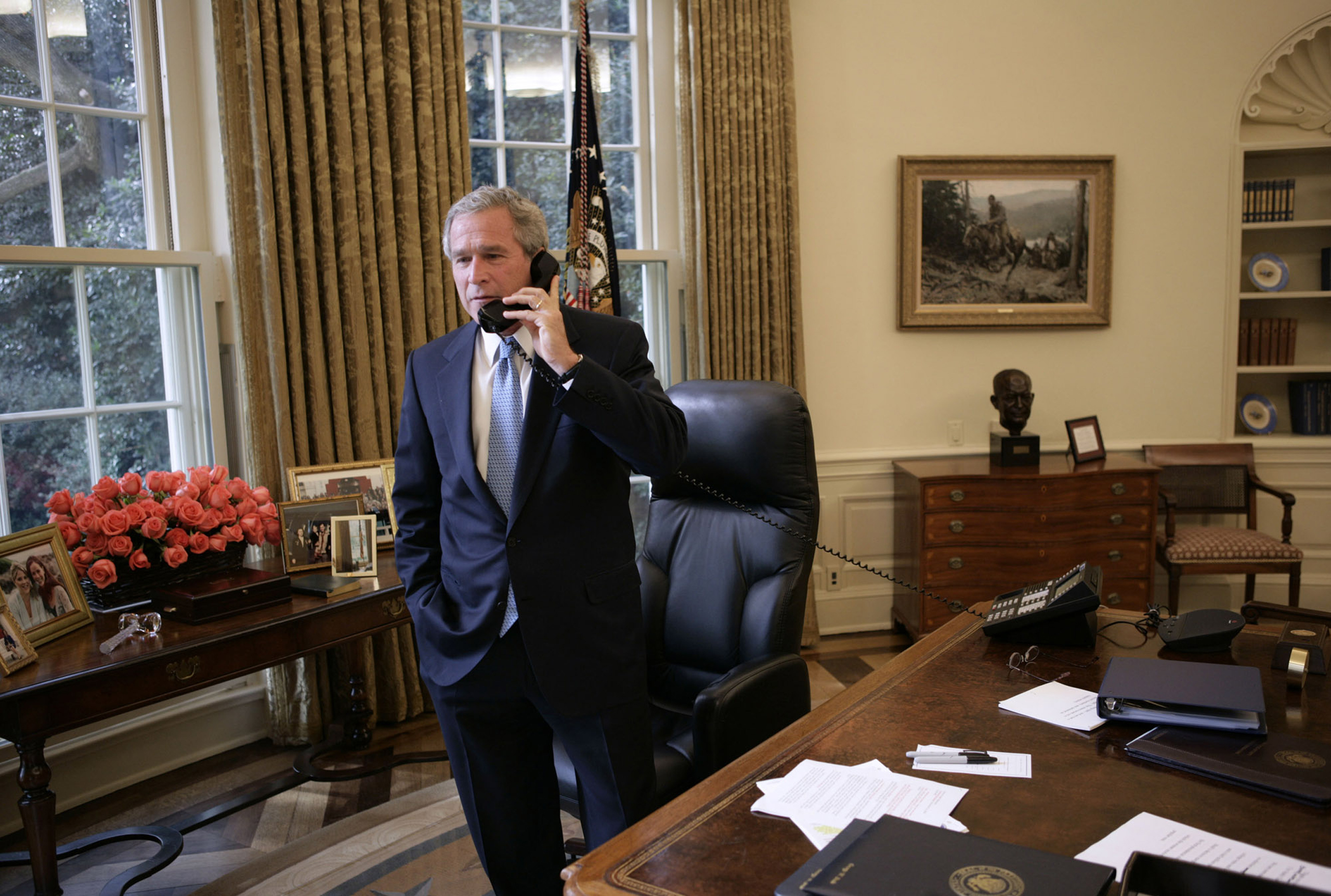
President George W. Bush receives a phone call from Democratic presidential candidate John Kerry in which the senator concedes defeat in the 2004 presidential election Wednesday, Nov. 3, 2004.

- November 2 –
  - General nationwide voting takes place.
  - Attorney General John Ashcroft submits a letter of resignation, later followed by Commerce Secretary Donald Evans. These resignations are not announced until November 9.
- November 3 –
  - Republican President George W. Bush wins the popular vote, receiving 3.58 million more votes than Democratic Senator John Kerry. (51.6% to 48.4%, 59.0 million to 55.4 million) Claiming victory in the swing state of Ohio, Bush is expected to have more than the 270 votes needed when the U.S. Electoral College meets on December 13.
  - Senator John Kerry concedes to President George W. Bush "The outcome should be decided by voters, not a protracted legal process", Kerry said. "I would not give up if there was a chance we could prevail." (Reuters) (BBC)
  - Three hundred protesters in Bellingham, Washington join in a spontaneous demonstration against Bush's victory. Over 100 protesters also march in Portland, Oregon, and a smaller protest occurs in Eugene, Oregon.

=== December 2004 ===
- December 13 – Members of the U.S. Electoral College meet in each state to cast their votes for president. As was expected, 286 out of 538 electoral votes are cast for incumbent President George W. Bush, while 251 votes are cast for John Kerry. A lone vote is cast by a Minnesota elector for John Edwards, the Democratic Vice-Presidential candidate.

=== January 2005 ===
- January 6 – The electoral votes are officially tallied before the 109th U.S. Congress in a joint session, with Vice President Dick Cheney presiding. During the session, however, Ohio Representative Stephanie Tubbs Jones and California Senator Barbara Boxer, both Democrats, lodged a protest over alleged voting irregularities in Ohio on the Election Day. That measure was defeated by a vote of 267–31 in the House of Representatives and 74–1 in the Senate. Boxer cast the lone dissenting vote in the Senate. At 22:11 UTC, the Senate officially accepts the results of the U.S. Presidential Election, 2004, re-electing George W. Bush.
- January 20 – At high noon, George W. Bush is sworn into his second term as U.S. president. This occasion marks the 55th U.S. Presidential Inauguration Day, as set by the Twentieth Amendment to the United States Constitution.

== In depth analysis of week of 2004 election ==
This page contains a timeline of the 2004 U.S. presidential election. For a more in-depth discussion of the candidates and issues at stake in that election and the campaign history leading up to election day, see U.S. presidential election, 2004. For information on other races conducted the same day, see U.S. Senate election, 2004 and U.S. House election, 2004. For an explanation of the U.S. presidential election process see U.S. Electoral College.

The U.S. presidential election occurred on November 2, 2004. However, as in the 2000 U.S. election, the election was too close for a winner to be declared that night. By the next morning, the Republican campaign was declaring a victory while the results in several states remained too close for the media to declare winners. Soon afterward the Kerry campaign decided that there were not enough uncounted votes in Ohio for them to win that state and Kerry telephoned Bush to concede. At 2 p.m. EST, Kerry held a news conference announcing the same. An hour later, Bush held his own to accept his victory.

In Ohio, the Libertarian and Green parties raised $113,600 necessary to fund a recount of the popular vote, which took place in early December and upheld the Bush victory in that state.

== Events ==
=== Tuesday, November 2, 2004 ===
==== Morning ====
- Citizens in two small New Hampshire towns were the first to have their ballots counted in the 2004 U.S. presidential election. The polls were opened at midnight and closed within minutes as everyone who had registered had voted. In Dixville Notch, the more famous of the two due to its longstanding tradition of early voting, the incumbent lost ground compared to his showing in 2000, but got more total votes than the challenger: Bush –19, Kerry – 7. Bush also won the vote in Hart's Location, which managed to report its results slightly earlier this year; Bush – 16, Kerry – 14, and Nader – 1. (09:00 UTC, November 2, 2004, Associated Press (Associated Press) (Reuters) In both cases this represented a small swing compared with the 2000 results from the Republican candidate to the Democratic candidate.
- "U.S. Supreme Court Justice John Paul Stevens Tuesday allowed Republicans to challenge voter qualifications at the polls in Ohio, a key battleground state that could determine the presidential election. Stevens acted on an emergency request shortly before polls opened in Ohio and across the nation." He refused to set aside a U.S. appeals court order, issued Monday, which, reversing a lower court's ban, permitted political party members to challenge the credentials of potential voters at polling places across the state. -Reuters (Bloomberg)
- Some reports say Florida, Virginia, Maryland, and Washington, D.C., (and possibly other states) have received record numbers of requests for absentee ballots for this election. Absentee ballots are counted differently based on the state, with most states counting them on election day, but with some exceptions, the last deadline being 10 days after the election (all Washington, D.C., absentee ballots, and oversea absentee ballots in Ohio and Florida). Washington State allows 15 days after the election for out of country absentee ballots to come in. It is possible that absentee ballots are being requested due to concerns about electronic voting, or simply due to an expected high overall voter turnout.

==== Afternoon ====
- Early exit polling shows strong Kerry battleground states edge. Early exit polling has in the past tended to favor Republicans, though it favored Al Gore in several key states in the 2000 election.
- Leroy Chiao, currently stationed on the International Space Station, cast his vote by encrypted e-mail and became the first American to vote in a presidential election from space.
- Slate reports exit polls from ten states, with John Kerry winning in Florida, Ohio, Pennsylvania, Wisconsin, Michigan, Minnesota and New Mexico. Bush projected to win in Nevada, North Carolina and Colorado. Together with the polls from MyDD there are results from 34 states. Kerry leads with 192 electoral votes, while Bush has 152.
- Based on exit polls, Zogby predicts a decisive 311 to 213 win for Kerry with 14 electoral votes too close to call.
- As the day progresses, late-day exit polls show that Florida has flipped to Bush, but by a narrow margin, and Nevada to Kerry, giving the challenger a 289–249 edge.

==== Evening ====
- At 7:00 pm EST, polls close in GA, IN, KY, SC, VT, and VA. CNN, CBS, ABC, NBC, and Fox News Channel all agree in projecting Georgia, Indiana, and Kentucky for Bush, and Vermont for Kerry, giving the Republicans a 34–3 lead.
- At 7:30 pm, polls close in OH and WV. ABC, CBS, CNN, and Fox News call West Virginia for Bush. NBC waits 15 minutes before concurring. Bush leads 39–3.
- At 8:00 pm, polls are closed in AL, CT, DE, DC, FL, IL, KS, ME, MD, MA, MI, MS, MO, NJ, OK, PA, TN, and TX. CNN, CBS, Fox, and NBC project Alabama, Oklahoma, and Tennessee for President Bush; Connecticut, Delaware, Washington DC, Illinois, Massachusetts, Maryland, Maine (at-large vote and first congressional district), New Jersey, and Vermont for Senator Kerry: current electoral vote is 77–66, Kerry ahead. ABC does not call Maine until a half-hour later and has Kerry ahead 74–66.
- NBC calls North Carolina for Bush, 81–77 for Bush
- CNN (and ABC, and possibly others) projects South Carolina (8), Virginia (13), Kansas (6), Nebraska (4), North Dakota (3), South Dakota (3), Texas (34) and Wyoming (3) for President Bush, and New York (31) and Rhode Island (4) for Senator Kerry. Projected count 155–112 for Bush. According to these numbers, both candidates have won the same states that their parties won in the 2000 election, but redistribution of districts means that the Democrats have lost 5 electoral votes and the Republicans have won 2 with respect to those elections.
- CNN and ABC project Louisiana (9) and Mississippi (6) for the president, leaving the count at 170–112 for the incumbent.
- FoxNewsChannel has Bush at 193–112 with Missouri (11), Arkansas (5) and Utah (5) now in the Bush column.
- ABC has Bush at 196–112, with Montana (3) for the president with Bush ahead in swing states Florida and Ohio, but way behind in Pennsylvania.
- FoxNewsChannel says Bush has 75% chance of winning Florida
- CBS, CNN and FoxNewsChannel call Pennsylvania for Kerry, 196-133 for Bush. Florida would give Bush 223
- CNN projects California (55) for Kerry, Idaho (4) for Bush. 200-188 Bush in front (for ABC, as CNN has not called Montana).
- ABC calls Arizona (10) for Bush. 210–188.
- CNN won't call Florida but says Kerry camp is all but conceding there.
- ABC has Bush 237-Kerry 188
- ABC, BBC and CNN call Florida for Bush
- On CNN, Bush re-election committee chair Marc Racicot says we'll have a result tonight, seemed quietly confident of victory in Ohio and generally. Kerry camp still optimistic about Ohio.
- Kerry camp less optimistic now, according to FoxNews.
- ABC says Bush 237 Kerry 195; Fox says Bush 246 Kerry 206
- BBC, CNN, ABC and FoxNews call Colorado for Bush.
- Votes still being cast in Ohio. Peter Snow for the BBC estimates a Bush 279 Kerry 259 result if Bush takes Ohio; Kerry 'could get through the winning post otherwise'.
- Fox calls New Hampshire, plus 2nd Congressional District of Maine, for Kerry.
- Fox calls Ohio for Bush.
- BBC claims that the one Maine vote given to Bush has been given to Kerry, who now has all 4 Maine votes.
- BBC calls Washington for Kerry.
- Fox calls Alaska for Bush.
- NBC calls Ohio for Bush.
- BBC News reports that Bush Camp is timidly beginning to celebrate a victory while Kerry Camp remains silent
- CNN calls Ohio 'too close to call'.
- CBS calling Michigan for Kerry.
- CNN calls Minnesota for Kerry.
- CNN calls Hawaii for Kerry.
- CNN reports Democratic VP candidate John Edwards says: "We've waited four years for this victory. We can wait one more night" as results lag in Ohio and Iowa.
- Former Republican mayor of New York City Rudy Giuliani says that Kerry should concede "for the good of the country."

=== Wednesday, November 3, 2004 ===
- After 1 a.m., CNN changes exit polling results in Ohio from Kerry ahead to Bush ahead.
- BBC, ABC, CBS, CNN call Nevada for Bush. FOX News and MSNBC, who both earlier called Ohio for Bush, do not call Nevada for Bush—yet as of 4:07 a.m. EST. (Calling both for Bush would be equivalent to calling the presidency for Bush.)
- NBC calls Minnesota for Kerry.
- Tom Brokaw of NBC News refuses to call Nevada for Bush as long as outstanding absentee ballots (rumored to be as many as 60,000) have not been counted. Another reason for refusal is the contention by the Kerry camp that Ohio should not be called for Bush.
- BBC, CNN call Wisconsin for Kerry.
- On a special edition of Today, Tom Brokaw announces that NBC News will not call any more states for either candidate as long as the Kerry camp contests the Bush win in Ohio. This puts the NBC News electoral vote count at 269 for Bush and 238 for Kerry.
- White House Chief of Staff Andy Card claims victory for Bush before Kerry concedes or any of the networks call a winner.
- AP & CNN report Kerry has called Bush and conceded the election. NBC finally calls Nevada for Bush.
- Kerry conceded at 2 p.m. EST CNN, NPR; ABC finally calls Ohio for Bush
- Bush declared victory at 3 p.m. EST saying, "America has spoken, and I'm humbled by the trust and the confidence of my fellow citizens. With that trust comes a duty to serve all Americans. And I will do my best to fulfill that duty every day as your president." Networks have still not declared victors in several states.
- "Black Box Voting (.ORG) is conducting the largest Freedom of Information action in history. At 8:30 p.m. Election Night, Black Box Voting blanketed the U.S. with the first in a series of public records requests, to obtain internal computer logs and other documents from 3,000 individual counties and townships. Networks called the election before anyone bothered to perform even the most rudimentary audit." http://blackboxvoting.org/#foia
- Voting machines controversy in PA. Before polls even opened in Philadelphia, 2,000 votes had already been cast on voting machines. Drudge Report. Philadelphia election officials and the district attorney quickly discounted this, apparently Republican operatives mistakenly believed the counter that records the total number of votes ever made on the voting machines was a count for a candidate.
- Voting machines controversy in Ohio. Walden O'Dell, the head of Diebold Incorporated, had said in 2003 that he is "committed to helping Ohio deliver its electoral votes to the president next year."
- In Iowa, a glitch with an optical vote counting machine caused Greene County to not report results for 6 of 15 precincts. A replacement machine was brought in and counting resumed at 9:45 a.m., including recounting of the 9 precincts already counted. The count was finished in just over an hour and half.

=== Friday, November 5, 2004 ===
- "A computer error involving one voting-machine cartridge gave President Bush 3,893 extra votes in a Gahanna precinct. Franklin County's [Ohio] unofficial results gave Bush 4,258 votes to Democratic challenger John Kerry's 260 votes in Precinct 1B, which votes at New Life Church on Stygler Road. Records show only 638 voters cast ballots in that precinct." The machines in question are Danaher Controls Inc.'s ELECTronic 1242, an older-style touchscreen voting system, these machines are only used in Franklin County.
- Left-leaning online blog Black Box Voting takes the position that fraud took place in the 2004 election through electronic voting machines.
- Federal Court orders Florida officials to preserve absentee ballots received after election day.

=== Sunday, November 7, 2004 ===
- The Ralph Nader / Peter Camejo campaign filed a challenge to the voting results in New Hampshire after receiving numerous complaints from voting rights activists. This effort is widely encouraged by Democrats and Independents due to suspected flaws related to Diebold Election Systems voting machines.

=== Tuesday, November 9, 2004 ===
- Rocky Mountain News November 9, 2004 "A printing error that distorted bar codes on paper ballots is being blamed for delays that made this one of the last counties in the nation to report election results."

=== Thursday, November 11, 2004 ===
- "Green and Libertarian Presidential Candidates to Demand Ohio Recount."
- "Nader calls for US election recounts" in Ohio, Florida, New Hampshire, and North Carolina.

=== Saturday, November 13, 2004 ===
Start of count of provisional ballots in Ohio. By Ohio law, provisional ballots are counted starting 10 days after the election.

=== Monday, December 13, 2004 ===
- Electoral college delegates cast their votes.
- Legally binding recount begins in Ohio.

=== Thursday, January 6, 2005 ===
- The electoral vote for the United States Presidency is officially certified as 286 for Republican President George W. Bush, 251 for Democratic Senator John Kerry, and 1 for Democratic Senator John Edwards, leading to Bush's reelection, despite a formal challenge to Ohio's electoral votes, the first challenge since 1877, resulting in a vote — 1-74 (Yea-Nay) in the Senate and 31–267 in the House.

== Election incidents ==
As of November 10, there were 31,515 reported incidents of voting problems nationally, with approx. 350 new incidents being reported a day. One-third of the problems (12,074) involved voter registration, followed by "polling place inquiries" (7,073), absentee ballot-related problems (3,218) and machine problems (1,599). The latter included complaints that some machines registered votes for George W. Bush when the voter selected John Kerry.

Some allege that voting locations that used electronic voting machines that did not issue a paper receipt or offer auditability correlate geographically with areas that had unilateral discrepancies between exit poll numbers and actual results. Exit polling data in these areas show significantly higher support for Kerry than actual results (outside the margin of error). Some are concerned that, from a statistical perspective, this may be indicative of vote rigging, because the likelihood of this happening by chance is less than 1 in 50,000. Others point out this could be explained by poor exit polling techniques or all discrepancies may be within the margin of error.

The first map shows the counties that voted democratic in the 2004 election. The dark blue counties are the most densely populated counties in Florida. The second map shows the Florida counties where absentee voting problems were reported. Orange counties had between 10 and 100 reported problems. The third map shows the Florida counties that use touch-screen electronic voting machines in red. The fourth map shows the Florida counties in which machine problems were reported. Incidents reports for Palm Beach, Broward County, Miami-Dade, and others are available at.

The above map shows all reported election incidents. The dark red states have over 1,000 reported incidents, red states have >100, orange have >10, yellow have >1. An interactive map is available at voteprotect.org.

=== Results of the Election By State ===
These are links to maps: Timeline of Poll Closings and Network Calls map, BBC News map, CBC News map, CBS News map, CNN.com map, Fox News map, NPR News map, The New York Times map

Map Legend: Unless otherwise noted on results maps the color red represents the Republican Party, and the color blue represents the Democratic Party.

== Certificates of Ascertainment ==
Each state submitted their official election results to the president of the Senate and the National Archivist. The following results are from these Certificates of Ascertainment.

Election Results

=== National 538 ===
Candidate	Electoral Votes	Pop. Votes	Pop. Vote %
Bush	286	62,025,715	50.7%
Kerry	251	59,025,937	48.3%
Edwards	1
Other	0	1,177,339	1.0%

Electoral votes next to state names	George W. Bush (Republican)	John Kerry (Democrat)

=== Alabama 9 ===
Candidate	Popular Votes	Popular Vote %
Bush	1,176,394	62.5%
Kerry	693,933	36.9%
Others	12,190	0.6%

=== Alaska 3 ===
Candidate	Popular Votes	Popular Vote %
Bush	190,889	62.5%
Kerry	111,025	35.6%
Others	9,894	3.2%

=== Arizona 10 ===
Candidate	Popular Votes	Popular Vote %
Bush	1,104,294	54.9%
Kerry	893,524	44.4%
Others	14,767	0.7%

=== Arkansas 6 ===
Candidate	Popular Votes	Popular Vote %
Bush	572,770	54.4%
Kerry	468,631	44.5%
Others	12,293	1.2%

=== California 55 ===
Candidate	Popular Votes	Popular Vote %
Bush	5,509,826	44.4%
Kerry	6,745,485	54.3%
Others	164,546	1.3%

=== Colorado* 9 ===
Candidate	Popular Votes	Popular Vote %
Bush	1,101,255	51.7%
Kerry	1,001,732	47.0%
Others	27,343	1.3%

=== Connecticut 7 ===
Candidate	Popular Votes	Popular Vote %
Bush	693,766	43.9%
Kerry	857,434	54.3%
Others	27,462	1.7%

=== Delaware 3 ===
Candidate	Popular Votes	Popular Vote %
Bush	171,660	45.8%
Kerry	200,152	53.4%
Others	3,278	0.9%

=== District of Columbia 3 ===
Candidate	Popular Votes	Popular Vote %
Bush	21,256	9.3%
Kerry	202,970	89.2%
Others	3,360	1.5%

=== Florida 27 ===
Candidate	Popular Votes	Popular Vote %
Bush	3,964,522	52.1%
Kerry	3,583,544	47.1%
Others	61,744	0.8%

=== Georgia 15 ===
Candidate	Popular Votes	Popular Vote %
Bush	1,914,254	58.0%
Kerry	1,366,149	41.4%
Others	18,387	0.6%

=== Hawaii 4 ===
Candidate	Popular Votes	Popular Vote %
Bush	194,184	45.3%
Kerry	231,691	54.0%
Others	3,114	0.7%

=== Idaho 4 ===
Candidate	Popular Votes	Popular Vote %
Bush	409,235	68.5%
Kerry	181,098	30.3%
Others	6,928	1.2%

=== Illinois 21 ===
Candidate	Popular Votes	Popular Vote %
Bush	2,346,608	44.5%
Kerry	2,891,989	54.8%
Others	36,130	0.7%

=== Indiana 11 ===
Candidate	Popular Votes	Popular Vote %
Bush	1,479,438	59.9%
Kerry	969,011	39.3%
Others	19,553	0.8%

=== Iowa 7 ===
Candidate	Popular Votes	Popular Vote %
Bush	751,957	49.9%
Kerry	741,898	49.3%
Others	11,959	0.8%

=== Kansas 6 ===
Candidate	Popular Votes	Popular Vote %
Bush	736,456	62.0%
Kerry	434,993	36.6%
Others	16,260	1.4%

=== Kentucky 8 ===
Candidate	Popular Votes	Popular Vote %
Bush	1,069,439	59.5%
Kerry	712,733	39.7%
Others	13,710	0.8%

=== Louisiana 9 ===
Candidate	Popular Votes	Popular Vote %
Bush	1,102,169	56.7%
Kerry	820,299	42.2%
Others	20,638	1.1%

=== Maine** 4 ===
Candidate	Popular Votes	Popular Vote %
Bush	330,201	44.6%
Kerry	396,842	53.6%
Others	13,705	1.9%

=== Maryland 10 ===
Candidate	Popular Votes	Popular Vote %
Bush	1,024,703	43.0%
Kerry	1,334,493	56.0%
Others	25,018	1.0%

=== Massachusetts 12 ===
Candidate	Popular Votes	Popular Vote %
Bush	1,071,109	36.9%
Kerry	1,803,800	62.1%
Others	30,451	1.0%

=== Michigan 17 ===
Candidate	Popular Votes	Popular Vote %
Bush	2,313,746	47.8%
Kerry	2,479,178	51.2%
Others	46,323	1.0%

=== Minnesota 9 (+1 to Edwards) ===
Candidate	Popular Votes	Popular Vote %
Bush	1,346,694	47.7%
Kerry	1,445,014	51.1%
Others	34,157	1.2%

=== Mississippi 6 ===
Candidate	Popular Votes	Popular Vote %
Bush	672,660	59.0%
Kerry	457,766	40.2%
Others	9,398	0.8%

=== Missouri 11 ===
Candidate	Popular Votes	Popular Vote %
Bush	1,455,713	53.3%
Kerry	1,259,171	46.1%
Others	16,480	0.6%

=== Montana 3 ===
Candidate	Popular Votes	Popular Vote %
Bush	266,063	59.1%
Kerry	173,710	38.6%
Others	10,661	2.4%

=== Nebraska** 5 ===
Candidate	Popular Votes	Popular Vote %
Bush	512,814	66.0%
Kerry	254,328	32.7%
Others	10,113	1.3%

=== Nevada 5 ===
Candidate	Popular Votes	Popular Vote %
Bush	418,690	50.7%
Kerry	397,190	48.1%
Others	10,019	1.2%

=== New Hampshire 4 ===
Candidate	Popular Votes	Popular Vote %
Bush	331,237	49.0%
Kerry	340,511	50.4%
Others	4,429	0.7%

=== New Jersey 15 ===
Candidate	Popular Votes	Popular Vote %
Bush	1,668,003	46.2%
Kerry	1,911,430	53.0%
Others	30,258	0.8%

=== New Mexico 5 ===
Candidate	Popular Votes	Popular Vote %
Bush	376,930	49.8%
Kerry	370,942	49.0%
Others	8,432	1.1%

=== New York 31 ===
Candidate	Popular Votes	Popular Vote %
Bush	2,962,567	40.1%
Kerry	4,314,280	58.4%
Others	111,480	1.7%

=== North Carolina 15 ===
Candidate	Popular Votes	Popular Vote %
Bush	1,961,166	56.1%
Kerry	1,525,849	43.6%
Others	11,731	0.3%

=== North Dakota 3 ===
Candidate	Popular Votes	Popular Vote %
Bush	196,651	62.9%
Kerry	111,052	35.5%
Others	5,121	1.6%

=== Ohio 20 ===
Candidate	Popular Votes	Popular Vote %
Bush	2,858,727	50.8%
Kerry	2,739,952	48.7%
Others	26,993	0.5%

=== Oklahoma 7 ===
Candidate	Popular Votes	Popular Vote %
Bush	959,792	65.6%
Kerry	503,966	34.4%
Others	0	0.0%

=== Oregon 7 ===
Candidate	Popular Votes	Popular Vote %
Bush	866,831	47.4%
Kerry	943,163	51.6%
Others	17,832	1.0%

=== Pennsylvania 21 ===
Candidate	Popular Votes	Popular Vote %
Bush	2,793,847	48.5%
Kerry	2,938,095	51.0%
Others	33,822	0.6%

=== Rhode Island 4 ===
Candidate	Popular Votes	Popular Vote %
Bush	169,046	38.7%
Kerry	259,760	59.4%
Others	8,328	1.9%

=== South Carolina 8 ===
Candidate	Popular Votes	Popular Vote %
Bush	937,974	58.1%
Kerry	661,699	41.0%
Others	15,933	1.0%

=== South Dakota 3 ===
Candidate	Popular Votes	Popular Vote %
Bush	232,584	59.9%
Kerry	149,244	38.4%
Others	6,387	1.6%

=== Tennessee 11 ===
Candidate	Popular Votes	Popular Vote %
Bush	1,384,375	56.8%
Kerry	1,036,477	42.5%
Others	16,467	0.7%

=== Texas 34 ===
Candidate	Popular Votes	Popular Vote %
Bush	4,526,917	61.1%
Kerry	2,832,704	38.2%
Others	51,128	0.7%

=== Utah 5 ===
Candidate	Popular Votes	Popular Vote %
Bush	663,742	71.0%
Kerry	241,199	26.4%
Others	29,907	2.5%

=== Vermont 3 ===
Candidate	Popular Votes	Popular Vote %
Bush	121,180	38.8%
Kerry	184,067	58.9%
Others	7,062	2.3%

=== Virginia 13 ===
Candidate	Popular Votes	Popular Vote %
Bush	1,716,959	53.8%
Kerry	1,454,742	45.6%
Others	21,193	0.7%

=== Washington 11 ===
Candidate	Popular Votes	Popular Vote %
Bush	1,304,894	45.6%
Kerry	1,510,201	52.8%
Others	43,989	1.5%

=== West Virginia 5 ===
Candidate	Popular Votes	Popular Vote %
Bush	423,778	56.0%
Kerry	326,541	43.2%
Others	6,026	0.8%

=== Wisconsin 10 ===
Candidate	Popular Votes	Popular Vote %
Bush	1,478,120	49.4%
Kerry	1,489,504	49.7%
Others	26,397	0.9%

=== Wyoming 3 ===
Candidate	Popular Votes	Popular Vote %
Bush	167,629	69.0%
Kerry	70,776	29.1%
Others	4,543	1.9%

== Footnotes ==
=== Third party candidates ===
Third Party Totals (other)
Others	Votes	Vote %
Ralph Nader (Reform, Independent)	394,578	0.34%
Michael Badnarik (Libertarian)	371,820	0.32%
Michael Peroutka (Constitution)	127,752	0.10%
David Cobb (Green)	102,797	0.07%
Leonard Peltier (PFP) (only on ballot in California)	21,616	0.03%
Walt Brown (SPUSA)	10,107	0.01%
Roger Calero / James Harris (Socialist Workers)	5,244	<0.01%
Bill Van Auken (Socialist Equality)	2,078	<0.01%
None of these (option in Nevada)	3,379	<0.01%

=== Colorado constitutional amendment ===
* – Colorado had a constitutional amendment, Amendment 36, on the ballot this year which could have changed the process by which its electoral votes were distributed. The vote failed, so Colorado awarded all 9 of its electoral votes to Bush, the winner of the vote in that state. Results of the vote follow:

Colorado Amendment 36
Position	Votes	Vote %
Yes (proportional split)	355,712	34.10%
No (remains winner-take-all)	686,431	65.90%

=== Maine and Nebraska splits ===
** – Maine and Nebraska are unlike the other 48 states and the District of Columbia in that they allocate their electoral votes in the following manner: 1 for the winner of each congressional district, 2 for the state winner. However, neither state split the vote, so each of these states effectively went winner-take-all.

=== Pre-election odds ===
- On Tradesports, the Bush futures contract dropped from about 53, where it had been for several days before election, to about 30, in about an hour, but then rallied to 65–66 by 15:30 UTC. On Betfair the odds on a Bush victory increased from 1.75 at the beginning of the day, to 5.0 at 13:00 UTC, and moved down to 1.33 at 15:20 UTC.
- Oddschecker gave real time odds and accurate reflection of probabilities from various UK bookmakers.
- The Iowa Futures Market briefly showed Bush losing ground, with Kerry picking up.
- The price of light crude oil dropped the day before election by nearly $1.63 (3.2%), amid speculation that a win for Kerry would result in the abolition of President Bush's maximum-capacity Strategic Petroleum Reserve policy. Oil prices continued to fall after the election.
