= Timeline of Al Qa'qaa high explosives =

The timeline of Al Qa'qaa high explosives lists events regarding the storage and subsequent removal of high explosives at Al Qa'qaa in Iraq, leading to the Al Qa'qaa high explosives controversy.

For events related to the political controversy, please refer to and use Al Qa'qaa high explosives controversy.

== 1991 ==
- Al Qa'qaa complex severely damaged during Gulf War.
- June 9 - UNSCOM weapons inspectors begin inspections in Iraq, beginning the first inspection regime. This includes finding and sealing the HMX, RDX and PETN explosives at Al Qa'qaa.

== 1995 ==
- Charles Duelfer, a member of the UNSCOM inspections team in Iraq, urges the destruction of these HMX, RDX, and PETN explosives. The IAEA, headed by Hans Blix and assistant director Mohammed ElBaradei, rejects recommendations to destroy the stocks, opting rather to monitor them.

== 1998 ==
- December 16 - UNSCOM withdraws its staff from Iraq, ending the first weapons inspection regime.

== 2001 ==
- October 1 - Space Imaging Eurasia captures extensive satellite imagery of Al Qa'qaa, published by GlobalSecurity.org's Public Eye project.

== 2002 ==
=== November ===
- November 27 - UNMOVIC weapons inspectors resume inspections in Iraq, beginning the second inspection regime.

=== December ===
- December 9 - First new UN inspection of Al Qa'qaa facility. "An IAEA team at Al Qa'qaa began inventorying known explosive materials from the past nuclear programme that were previously under the control of the IAEA."
- December 15 - IAEA inspectors visit Al Mahaweel Stores, where the RDX is stored.

== 2003 ==
=== January ===
- January 9 - Mohamed ElBaradei, IAEA director, reports publicly on Al Qa'qaa's HMX stores to the Security Council.
- January 14 - IAEA inspectors visit Qa'qaa Stores, the location of the HMX explosives, located 60 km south of Baghdad.
- January 15 - IAEA inspectors visit Al Mahaweel, under Al Qa'qaa jurisdiction, where the bulk of the RDX is stored.

=== February ===
- February 14 - Mohamed Elbaradei reports to the Security Council that 32 tonnes of the HMX, previously under IAEA seal, were moved by Iraq between the two inspection regimes. They were apparently used for industrial purposes.

=== March ===
- March 8 - Most recent visit by UN weapons inspectors to Al Qa'qaa, one of many visits prior to the war.
- March 15 - The seals on the doors of the explosive stores are verified by IAEA inspectors.
- March 15 to March 20 - Iraq is under heavy surveillance to detect the potential movement of WMDs pending the US invasion.
- March 18 - UNMOVIC inspectors pull out of Iraq, ending the second inspections regime. They have not been allowed to return to date.
- March 20 - US led invasion of Iraq begins.

=== April ===
- April 5 - first visit by US troops to Al Qa'qaa complex, by 3rd Infantry Division.
  - The troops find white powder and atropine in a section of the Latifiyah Explosives and Ammunition Plant, itself part of Al Qa'qaa
- April 7 - US 3rd Infantry Division departed Al Qa'qaa by this time.
- April 9 - US forces secure Baghdad.
- April 10 - US 101st Airborne Division's 2nd Brigade arrives at Al Qa'qaa. They do not search the site.
- April 11 - 2nd Brigade leaves Al Qa'qaa.
- April 18 - News crew from KSTP-TV, embedded with the US 101st Airborne Division, films unguarded explosives and an unopened IAEA seal on a bunker door. Only HMX was sealed at the site.

=== May ===
- Paul Bremer reportedly warned by Iraqi officials that Al Qa'qaa has probably been looted.
- Internal IAEA memorandum reportedly warns that terrorists might be helping "themselves to the greatest explosives bonanza in history."
- US Weapons Inspector David Kay visits Al Qa'qaa complex. He later says: "I saw it in May and it was heavily looted at that time. Sometime between April and May most of the stuff was carried off. The site was in total disarray."
- May 27 - US 75th Exploitation Task Force reportedly visit Al Qa'qaa and finds the high explosives IAEA seals broken.

== 2004 ==
=== June ===
- June 28 - Iraqi Interim Government takes control of Al Qa'qaa.

=== October ===
- October 10 - Iraq Ministry of Science & Technology writes to IAEA: "We would like to inform you that the following materials ... registered under the IAEA custody were lost after 9-4-2003, through the theft and looting of the governmental installations due to lack of security."
- October 15 - IAEA warns the US mission in Vienna that the materials are missing.
- (within days) - Condoleezza Rice learns of the missing explosives, according to Scott McClellan
- October 25 - IAEA confirms to the UN Security Council that the explosives are missing.
- October 28 - A Pentagon source maintains that a US Infantry division removed 250 tons of explosives from the site, shortly after the Iraq War

=== November ===
- November 4 - L.A.Times reports that members of the 317th Support Center and the 258th Rear Area Operations Center US soldiers witnessed massive looting at Al Qa'qaa over several weeks in late April and early May.
