= Iskandariya =

Iskandariya الإسكندرية Alexandria of Iraq
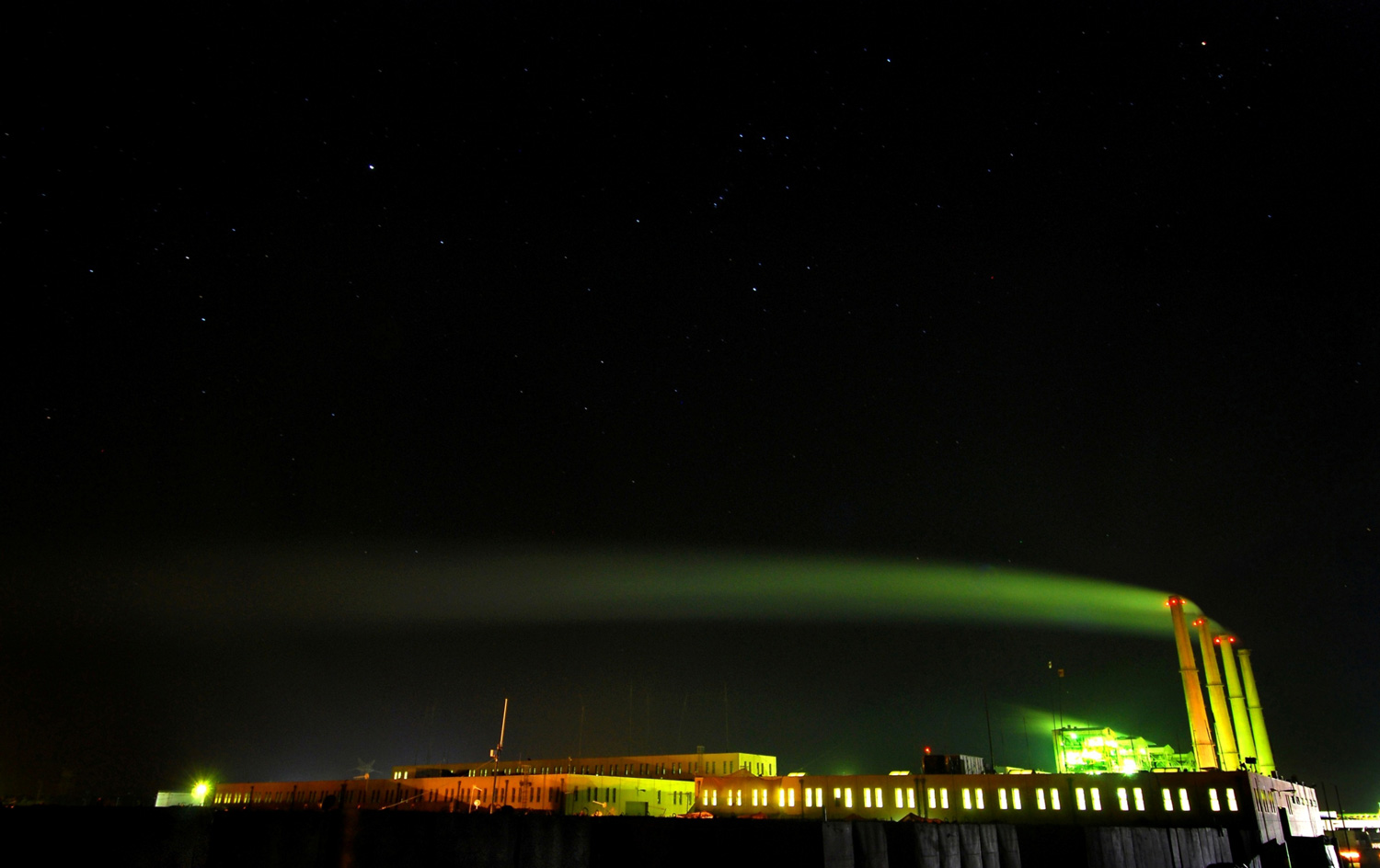
- Iskandariyah thermal power plant, 2008

- Iskandariya's location inside Iraq
- Coordinates: 32°54′N 44°21′E
- Country: Iraq
- Governorate: Babylon

Population (2018)
  - Total: 100,600

Al-Iskandariya or Alexandria (Arabic: الإسكندرية) (Note: also given as Iskandariyah, Iskanderiyah, Iskanderiya, Iskanderiyeh or Sikandariyeh or Al Askandariyah) is an ancient city in central Iraq, one of a number of towns in the Near East founded by and named after Alexander the Great (Al-Iskandar in Arabic). It is a majority Shia Arab district including Musayyib and Jurf Al Sakhr. The district capital is located about 70 kilometres (45 mi) south of Baghdad, near the Euphrates River.

== History ==
In ancient times Alexandria stood halfway between Babylon (the place of Alexander's death) and Seleucia on the Tigris (the capital of the Seleucid Empire, very near to modern Baghdad).

Buildings are mostly constructed with brick, mud, and sheet metal. The nearby city of Musayyib houses the largest power plant in Iraq. The Hateen Munitions Complex located in and around Alexandria housed the majority of the munitions for the former regime. There are also apartments in Iskandariya, called the Hateen Apartments, which received their name from all the workers at the munitions plant living there.

=== Saddam Hussein's nuclear programme ===
During the late 1980s, Alexandria was the site of a major element of Saddam Hussein's programme to acquire nuclear weapons. The Al Qaqaa State Establishment, located in the town, is believed to have been put in charge of developing the non-nuclear components for a nuclear weapon. It was subsequently inspected by United Nations weapons inspectors and officials from the International Atomic Energy Agency (IAEA). In 1989, the British journalist Farzad Bazoft was arrested there after visiting Alexandria to check reports that an explosion at the Al Qaqaa plant had killed 7000 people. He was subsequently executed by the Iraqi authorities.

The town is also the location of a major factory, the al-Quds General Company for Mechanical Industries. In 2001, the Iraqi government explored the possibility of establishing a joint Iraqi-Belarusian tractor factory on the site.

=== During the 2003 invasion of Iraq ===
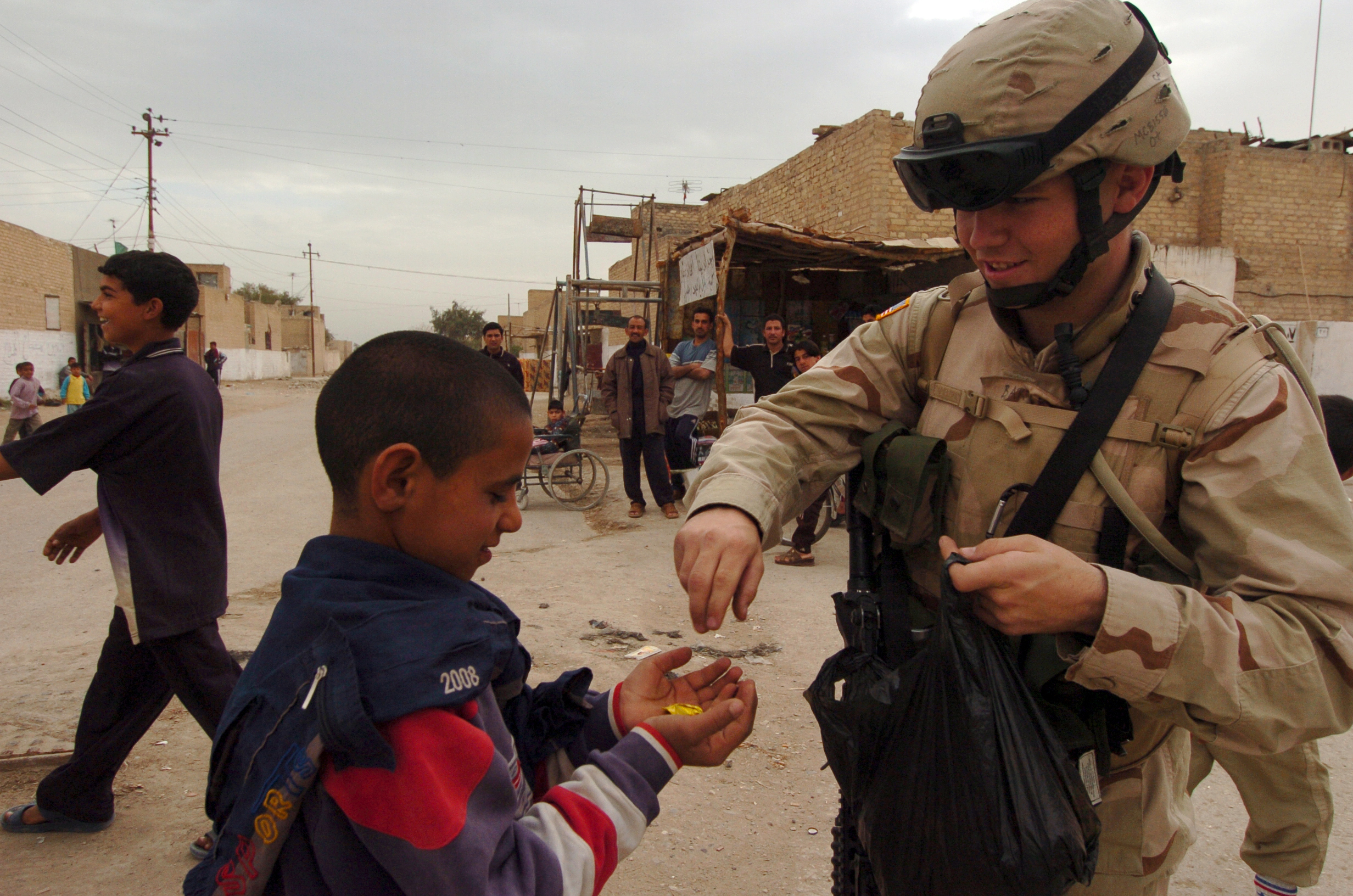
A young U.S. soldier hands out candy to a child in Iskandariya as locals look on (2005).

Alexandria is one of the last big towns before Baghdad and possesses a major military air base, and as such was a major target for United States forces during the 2003 invasion of Iraq. It fell quickly but was subsequently the scene of a number of lethal insurgent attacks against U.S. forces and the post-Saddam Iraqi security forces. On June 19, 2003, a soldier from the 804th Medical Brigade was killed when the military ambulance in which he was traveling was hit by a rocket propelled grenade near Alexandria. Another attack, on May 11, 2007, killed a soldier from the 18th Military Police Brigade. Three US Paratroopers from the Army's 82nd Airborne Division were killed by a roadside bomb on January 27, 2004 and another bombing on February 4 killed yet another soldier.

Forward Operating Base Alexandria, or FOB Iskandariyah a U.S. Military installation was established in Alexandria in May 2003.

On February 10, a car bomb outside a police station killed at least 45 Iraqis and wounded 150. No coalition forces were killed or injured, but commentators suggested that the attack was both a strike against pro-coalition Iraqi forces and an attempt to create conflict between Shia and Sunni Muslims.

On March 25, 2016 a terrorist believed to be affiliated with Islamic State of Iraq blew himself up at a soccer game in this town. The incident happened during an award ceremony following the game. The blast reportedly killed at least 31 people and injured more than 70 others. The town's mayor was among the casualties. Video surfaced on the Internet which claimed to show the bombing.

This town is the location of Al Qa'qaa, a major industrial facility and the location of the Al Qa'qaa high explosives controversy.

== See also ==
- List of places in Iraq
- Triangle of Death (Iraq)
- Iraqi insurgency (2003–11)
- List of United States Military installations in Iraq
