= Al Qa'qaa high explosives controversy =

2003 disappearance of explosives in Iraq

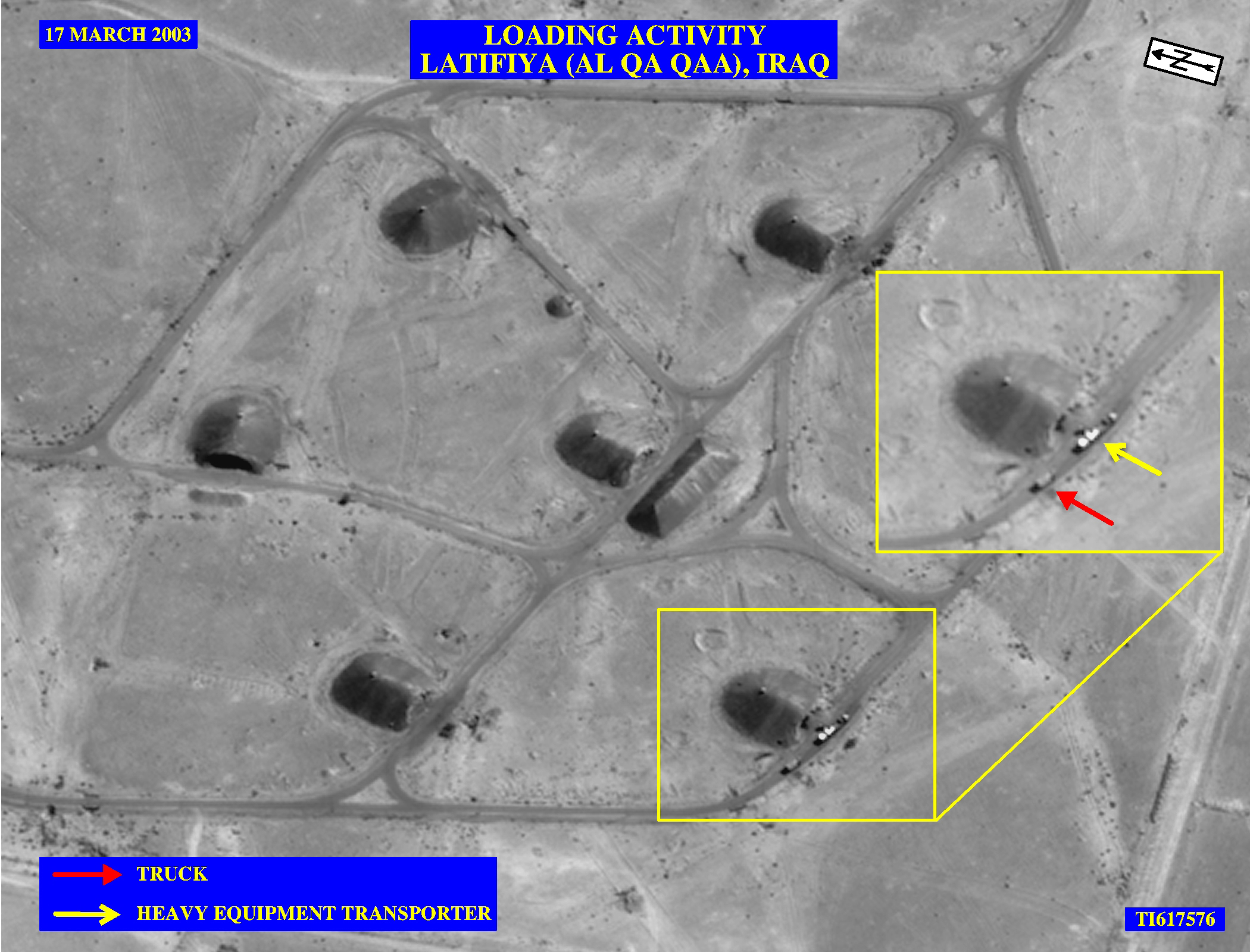
A U.S. government aerial photo of munitions bunkers at Al Qa'qaa, 17 March 2003

The Al Qa'qaa high explosives controversy concerns the possible removal of about 377 tonnes of high explosives (HMX and RDX) from the Al Qa'qaa facility by the Iraqi insurgency, after the 2003 invasion of Iraq. Although Pentagon spokesman Lawrence Di Rita said that the International Atomic Energy Agency (IAEA) has not come forward with documentation that explains how it arrived at the figure of 377 tons of missing explosives. The IAEA so far only has verified in its paperwork that 219 tons of explosive materials were at Al Qaqaa and surrounding facilities.

The explosives, considered dangerous by the IAEA, were certified by UN weapons inspectors to be inside facilities whose doors were fastened with chains and the United Nations' seal, at the Al Qa'qaa industrial complex in Iraq in 2003. By October 2004, the facility was empty.

== Background ==
In October 2004, the Iraqi interim government warned the U.S. that nearly 380 tons of conventional explosives had been removed from the Al Qa'qaa facility. The Bush administration was criticized for failing to guard known weapons stashes of this size after the invasion. Critics of the Bush administration claimed that U.S. forces were to blame for the looting, which put weapons that were formerly under UN control into the hands of insurgents.

The Bush administration asserted before the 2004 U.S. election that the explosives were either removed by Iraq before invaders captured the facility, or properly accounted for by US forces, even while White House and Pentagon officials acknowledged that they had vanished after the invasion.

MSNBC wrote:

Whether Saddam Hussein's forces removed the explosives before U.S. forces arrived April 3, 2003, or whether they fell into the hands of looters and insurgents afterward — because the site was not guarded by U.S. troops — has become a key issue in the campaign.

Time magazine reported the sequence of events: "In late April IAEA's chief weapons inspector for Iraq warned the U.S. of the vulnerability of the site, and in May 2003, an internal IAEA memo warned that terrorists could be looting "the greatest explosives bonanza in history." Seventeen months later, on October 10, in response to a long-standing request from the IAEA to account for sensitive materials, the interim Iraqi government notified the agency that Al Qaqaa had been stripped clean. The White House learned about the notification a few days later."

Evidence indicated that the explosives were most likely removed after invading US forces captured the facility. The looting was witnessed by U.S. Army reservists and National Guardsman from separate units as well as officials of the new Iraqi government. Frank Rich editorialized in The New York Times (May 15, 2005):

It's also because of incompetent Pentagon planning that other troops may now be victims of weapons looted from Saddam's munitions depots after the fall of Baghdad. Yet when The New York Times reported one such looting incident, in Al Qaqaa, before the election, the administration and many in the blogosphere reflexively branded the story fraudulent. But the story was true. It was later corroborated not only by United States Army reservists and national guardsmen who spoke to The Los Angeles Times but also by Iraq's own deputy minister of industry, who told The New York Times two months ago that Al Qaqaa was only one of many such weapon caches hijacked on America's undermanned post-invasion watch.

For a timeline of events resulting in the storage and subsequent loss of the high explosives, please see Al Qa'qaa high explosives timeline.

== Other facilities looted ==
Sami al-Araji, Iraq's deputy minister of industry, noted that besides al Qa'qaa, looters had targeted explosives and other weapons material in the Nida Factory, the Badr General Establishment, Al Ameer, Al Radwan, Al Hatteen, and Al Qadisiya. Some of these factories had WMD (weapon of mass destruction) significance, such as the Nida Factory and Al Radwan, which were part of Saddam's nuclear program in the early 1990s. The looting of five of these sites were also confirmed by the IAEA's satellite reconnaissance.

Former U.S. Ambassador Peter W. Galbraith (who supported Bush's war in Iraq) reported two additional incidents of significant looting in post-invasion Iraq. He witnessed U.S. troops standing outside Baghdad's Disease Center as looters attacked the complex on 16 April 2003, "taking live HIV and black fever virus among other potentially lethal materials." At the same time, looters attacked Iraq's nuclear facilities at Tuwaitha, taking "barrels of yellowcake (raw uranium), apparently dumping the uranium and using the barrels to hold water. US troops were at Tuwaitha but did not interfere." Galbraith noted that the facilities were all under IAEA seal and that "they remained untouched until the US troops arrived."

Former counterterrorism directors for the National Security Council Daniel Benjamin and Steven Simon noted the danger of these nuclear materials falling into the hands of terrorists as a result of the U.S. invasion: "Another potential consequence of the invasion is the spread of weapons of mass destruction to al-Qaeda or other terrorists ... [T]he International Atomic Energy Agency certified that there were highly radioactive materials at the al-Tuwaitha facilities, including partially enriched—though not weapons-grade—uranium. These materials could be used to fabricate one or more radiological dispersion devices—or 'dirty bombs,' as they have come to be known. Some of these materials appear to be missing—how much remains unclear—and it seems a fair conjecture that someone ... may have 'privatized' these weapons with the intent of selling them to the highest bidder. Ultimately, this material could find its way into the hands of al-Qaeda. It is difficult to imagine a more horrifyingly ironic outcome to the war."

== Impact of the looting ==
Many commentators expressed fears that the explosives had fallen into the hands of terrorists and would be used by the Iraqi insurgency to mount attacks against US and Iraqi troops. Many insurgent attacks have been carried out using improvised explosive devices made from military munitions, most often 122 mm artillery shells and landmines. IEDs made with high explosives are far more powerful and devastating and have been used in some of the most damaging attacks carried out in Iraq, such as the August 19, 2003 suicide attack on the U.N. headquarters, and the March 17, 2004 attack on the Mount Lebanon Hotel, both in Baghdad. It is not clear whether these attacks were mounted using explosives from Al Qa'qaa. However, on October 28, 2004 a video was released by a group calling itself "Islam's Army Brigades, Al-Karar Brigade" in which a masked man claimed that "the American intelligence" had helped them to obtain a "huge amount of the explosives that were in the Al Qa'qaa facility" and that the explosives would be "use[d] against the occupation forces and those who cooperate with them in the event of these forces threatening any Iraqi city." And a December 2003 report from a joint Defense Department intelligence task force concluded that the insurgents in Iraq "retain access to virtually all the weapons systems and ordnances previously controlled by the Iraqi military, security and intelligence assets. Unsecured arms depots and storage sites, in addition to open and black market availability of weapons and ammunition, eliminate the need for the [insurgents] to maintain a formidable arsenal."

Montgomery McFate of the Human Terrain Team program noted in 2005:

The insurgency's ability to construct IEDs depends on the availability of bombmaking materials, particularly explosives. The widespread availability of explosives in Iraq means the insurgency will have the material resources to build IEDs for many years to come. Currently, approximately 80 tons of powerful conventional explosives (mainly HMX and RDX) are missing from the former Iraqi military base at Al Qaqaa. These explosives could produce bombs strong enough to shatter airplanes or tear apart buildings and are probably already in the hands of the insurgency. The director of the Iraqi police unit that defuses and investigates IEDs notes: "One of the coalition's fatal mistakes was to allow the terrorists into army storerooms. ... The terrorists took all the explosives they would ever need."

== The high explosives ==
The high explosives were stored under the supervision of the United Nations due to their sensitive nature and dual use in WMDs. According to the IAEA, there were 340 tonnes consisting of:

- 194.741 tonnes of HMX,
- 141.233 tonnes of RDX, and
- 5.800 tonnes of PETN.

These explosives were stored in solid crystalline form and could be used to make powerful plastic explosives, are safe to transport and do not detonate on impact. The total quantity, 341.744 tonnes (753,417 pounds), would require approximately 40 large trucks to convey.

== Chemical weapons equipment ==
In addition to the explosives, al Qa'qaa held some of the remnants of Iraq's chemical warfare program from the early 1990s, "including 800 pieces of chemical equipment." The areas that had been involved in chemical processing were "wrecked by fire and possible extensive looting" after the invasion; as The New York Times reported, "Unknown is the fate of such equipment there like separators, heat exchangers, mixers and chemical reactors, all of which can be used in making chemical weapons." (13 March 2005). The Times reported that "the kinds of machinery at the various sites included equipment that could be used to make missile parts, chemical weapons or centrifuges essential for enriching uranium for atom bombs." Gary Milhollin, director of the Wisconsin Project on Nuclear Arms Control, said, "Targeted looting of this kind of equipment has to be seen as a proliferation threat."

== The storage facilities ==
The HMX was stored at the Qa'qaa Store, one of a number of facilities at the Al Qa'qaa complex in Iraq. Al Qa'Qaa is very large, occupying 28 km² of land near to Iskandariya and about 48 km south of Baghdad. It includes almost 1100 individual structures and buildings. This is about the same size as Newport, Rhode Island, Little Cayman or Bath. As a result of its large size, most accounts of the complex deal only with a specific facility located within its bounds.

The Qa'qaa Store was located at the southern end of the facility in underground bunkers. The bunker doors were sealed by IAEA officials upon being closed. Although the doors were sealed, the bunker itself was not hermetically sealed. Air ventilation shafts leading into the bunkers were not sealed. The high explosives subject to the controversy were the only materials under UN seal at Al Qa'qaa.

The RDX was stored at the Al Mahaweel Stores, a site physically separate from, but administered by, Al Qa'qaa.

Satellite imagery of the main Al Qa'qaa complex (about 28 km ¹) is publicly available for 2001 from GlobalSecurity.org and for 2003 and 2004 from DigitalGlobe.

== Claims of removal prior to US arrival ==
- Fox News reported that a U.S. Army officer came forward Friday, October 29, 2004 claiming the 3rd Infantry Division took about 250 tons of munitions and other material, including plastic explosives, from Al Qaqaa 10 days after Saddam Hussein's regime fell in April 2003. According to ABC News, however, "the Pentagon stopped short of saying that the material that is reputed to be lost, missing, unaccounted for is the material that this exploitation team took away." (ABC World News Tonight, 31 October 2004).
- An aerial photograph declassified and released by Donald Rumsfeld showing two trucks at the site after IAEA inspectors last visited it before the invasion. However, the trucks in the photographs were not at any of the bunkers that had been identified as containing explosives. It has also been noted that they represent only a small fraction of the total shipping capacity required to move all the explosives.
- US Army Colonel David Perkins, commander of the 2nd Brigade of the 3rd Infantry Division which originally took the facility, and oversaw the area afterwards called the claim the explosives were taken after US troops were in the area "highly improbable". Perkins said that "the enemy sneaks a convoy of 10-ton trucks in and loads them up in the dark of night and infiltrates them in your convoy and moves out", he said. "That's kind of a stretch too far."
- According to an NBC news crew embedded with the 101st, large stockpiles of conventional weapons were found on April 10, 2003, but not the 380 tons of HMX or RDX

== Evidence against the claim of removal prior to US arrival ==
- A letter from former Iraqi Foreign Minister Naji Sabri (who was also a CIA asset at the time) to deposed Iraqi dictator Saddam Hussein "suggests taking the HMX from underground bunkers where it had been kept under seal by the International Atomic Energy Agency and giving it to suicide bombers." The letter was written on 4 April 2003.
- Explosives were reported intact after the invasion—Col. John Peabody of the 3rd Infantry Division told AP that his troops found thousands of boxes of explosives at the facility on 5 April 2003.
- DIA confirmation—the DIA issued a report on 9 November 2003 that concluded that the "[v]ast majority of explosives and ordnance used in anti-Coalition improvised explosive devices/IED s have come from pilfered Iraqi ammunition stockpiles and prewar established ... caches."
- Pentagon official—the AP reported on 25 October 2004 "At the Pentagon, an official who monitors developments in Iraq said US-led coalition troops had searched Al Qaqaa in the immediate aftermath of the March 2003 invasion and confirmed that the explosives, which had been under IAEA seal since 1991, were intact. Thereafter the site was not secured by U.S. forces, the official said, also speaking on condition of anonymity."
- videotape made by a KSTP-TV St. Paul, Minnesota, television crew embedded with U.S. 101st Airborne Division troops on April 18, 2003, nine days after Hussein's fall. The television crew accompanying US troops recorded the sealed explosives containers at the site, displaying ammunition caches and explosives and clearly displaying the ammunition cache of explosives and other weapons supplies. The New York Times summarized in April 2005, "videos taken by television crews with American troops show the bunkers were still full of explosives well after the invasion."
- Mohammed al-Sharaa, head of the science ministry's site monitoring department: "It is impossible that these materials could have been taken from this site before the regime's fall. The officials that were inside this facility (Al Qaqaa) beforehand confirm that not even a shred of paper left it before the fall."
- U.S. surveillance: the Los Angeles Times reported on 27 October 2004: "Given the size of the missing cache, it would have been difficult to relocate undetected before the invasion, when U.S. spy satellites were monitoring activity."
- Eyewitness testimony of Army reservists and National Guardsman from separate units as reported to the Los Angeles Times in November 2004.
- Iraqi Interim Government Investigation: Iraqi official Sami al-Araji reported on the Iraqi government's investigation into the theft, indicating that the looters "came in with the cranes and the lorries, and they depleted the whole sites. They knew what they were doing; they knew what they want. This was sophisticated looting."

== Timeline ==
- Alternative article Timeline of Al Qa'qaa high explosives for more information.

The Al Qa'qaa complex was occupied for two days by the United States Army's 3rd Infantry Division following a brief battle on April 3, 2003, shortly before the fall of Baghdad. Although no banned weapons were discovered, atropine and 2-Pam chloride — both antidotes for nerve gas — were reported found there. Thousands of bottles of white powder were also discovered, but were found to be explosives rather than chemical weapons.

On April 10, 2003, troops from the Second Brigade of the 101st Airborne Division arrived at Al Qa'qaa en route to Baghdad. They stopped overnight and moved on the following day. According to the brigade's commander, Colonel Joseph Anderson, at this point the complex showed few signs of looting or damage. Al Qa'qaa was reportedly unoccupied and unguarded until the arrival of the 75th Exploration Task Force (better known as Task Force 75) on May 27. By this time, according to Wathiq al-Dulaimi, a local security chief, and other local Iraqis, the complex had been thoroughly looted with enterprising locals even renting their trucks to looters. Task Force 75 found that the complex had largely been stripped of anything of value. Although they searched 32 bunkers and 87 other buildings, they found no signs of chemical, biological or nuclear weapons. The team did not find any of the explosives sealed by the IAEA inspectors two months earlier.

On April 13, a team from the 3rd Infantry Division led by Maj. Austin Pearson arrived at Al-Qaqaa. Pearson said at a Pentagon news conference that his mission was to secure and destroy ammunition and explosives. He estimated that his team, "Task Force Bullet", removed 250 tons of material including TNT, plastic explosives, detonation cords and munitions.

Pearson's story provoked skepticism as it came the morning after new videotape surfaced indicating that the explosives were still at the base after Saddam's fall; the videotape (from April 18, 2003) shows what appeared to be high explosives still in barrels bearing IAEA seals. "The photographs are consistent with what I know of Al Qaqaa", David A. Kay, who directed the hunt in Iraq for WMD and visited the site, told The New York Times. "The damning thing is the seals. The Iraqis didn't use seals on anything. So I'm absolutely sure that's an IAEA seal."

The situation did not become publicly known for over a year afterwards, but IAEA officials reportedly warned as early as May 2003 that looting at Al Qa'qaa could be "the greatest explosives bonanza in history." Although IAEA inspectors were unable to inspect the site themselves due to the US ban on their presence, they were able to obtain commercial satellite imagery in late 2003 that showed severe damage to the facility. Two of roughly ten bunkers in which high explosives had been stored appeared to have been leveled by blasts. Other bunkers were damaged and some were untouched.

On October 10, 2004, Dr. Mohammed J. Abbas of the Iraqi Ministry of Science and Technology wrote to the IAEA to say that the Qa'qaa stockpile had been lost after April 9, 2003, because of the "theft and looting of the governmental installations due to lack of security." Nearly 340 tonnes of HDX and RDX explosives, an amount equivalent to 40 ten-ton truckloads, was said to be missing.

The news led to an immediate controversy in the 2004 U.S. presidential election. Presidential challenger John Kerry has accused President George W. Bush of presiding over an inexcusable failure to prevent the loss of the explosives, while President Bush has criticized Senator Kerry for "jump[ing] to conclusions without knowing the facts."

On October 28, 2004, the DoD released imagery dated March 17, 2003, showing two trucks parked outside one of the 56 bunkers at Al Qa Qaa. However, the bunker nearest where the trucks were parked are not any of the nine bunkers identified by the IAEA as containing the missing explosive stockpiles.

On the same day, the London Financial Times reported that the French and Russians may have been involved in the removal of the explosives from Al Qa'qaa before the war began, quoting Deputy Undersecretary for Defense John A. Shaw, who said "various Russian units on the eve of hostilities [helped] to orchestrate the collection of munitions and assure their transport out of Iraq via Syria". He also told The Washington Times "the organized effort was done in advance of the conflict". The Washington Times also reported that defense officials believed the Russians could also explain what happened to Iraq's weapons of mass destruction programs. The Russian Government has denounced this theory as "nonsense", saying that there were no Russian military in the country at the time. Shaw's theory has attracted little public support from elsewhere in the administration.

On October 29, 2004, The New York Times reported the existence of a videotape made by a KSTP-TV St. Paul, Minnesota television crew embedded with U.S. 101st Airborne Division troops on April 18, 2003, nine days after Hussein's fall. The television crew accompanying US troops recorded the sealed explosives containers at the site, displaying the ammunition cache of explosives and other weapons supplies. Commentators have pointed out that the complex would have been under intensive surveillance during the war as a suspected centre of WMD production. They point out that an operation involving removing 40 truckloads of materials should have been extremely visible and would probably have been attacked, had it been spotted. Some said that the materials being moved might just as easily have been WMDs being moved to the battlefront. However, there is no indication that any such transport operation was spotted by US forces. The tape displaying the sealed explosives containers, as they were being found by the 101st Airborne Division troops, was re-broadcast by ABC on October 27, and by MSNBC on October 28, 2004. The explosives, classified as "dual use" materials, had been sealed by the IAEA, and reported 18 months earlier.

The administration subsequently stated that it was a "mystery" when the explosives disappeared and that the President did not want to comment on the matter until the facts were known. The Bush administration asserted that an investigation had begun into how, where, and when the explosives went missing; no such investigation has been reported on since the 2004 election.

In May 2005, Iraqi official Sami al-Araji reported on the Iraqi government's investigation into the theft, indicating that the looters "came in with the cranes and the lorries, and they depleted the whole sites. They knew what they were doing; they knew what they want. This was sophisticated looting." (The New York Times, March 13, 2005).
