= Voters Outreach of America =

American private voter registration firm

Voters Outreach of America is a private voter registration firm, based out of Las Vegas, Nevada, run by Aaron James. In October 2004, allegations surfaced in several states that the group had collected and submitted Republican voter registration forms while inappropriately disposing of Democratic registration forms. Oregon and Nevada subsequently announced investigations into these allegations. Under state laws in these states, private canvassers must turn in all forms they collect. Similar allegations were made in Western Pennsylvania.
