= Al Qa'qaa =

Weapons facility in Iraq

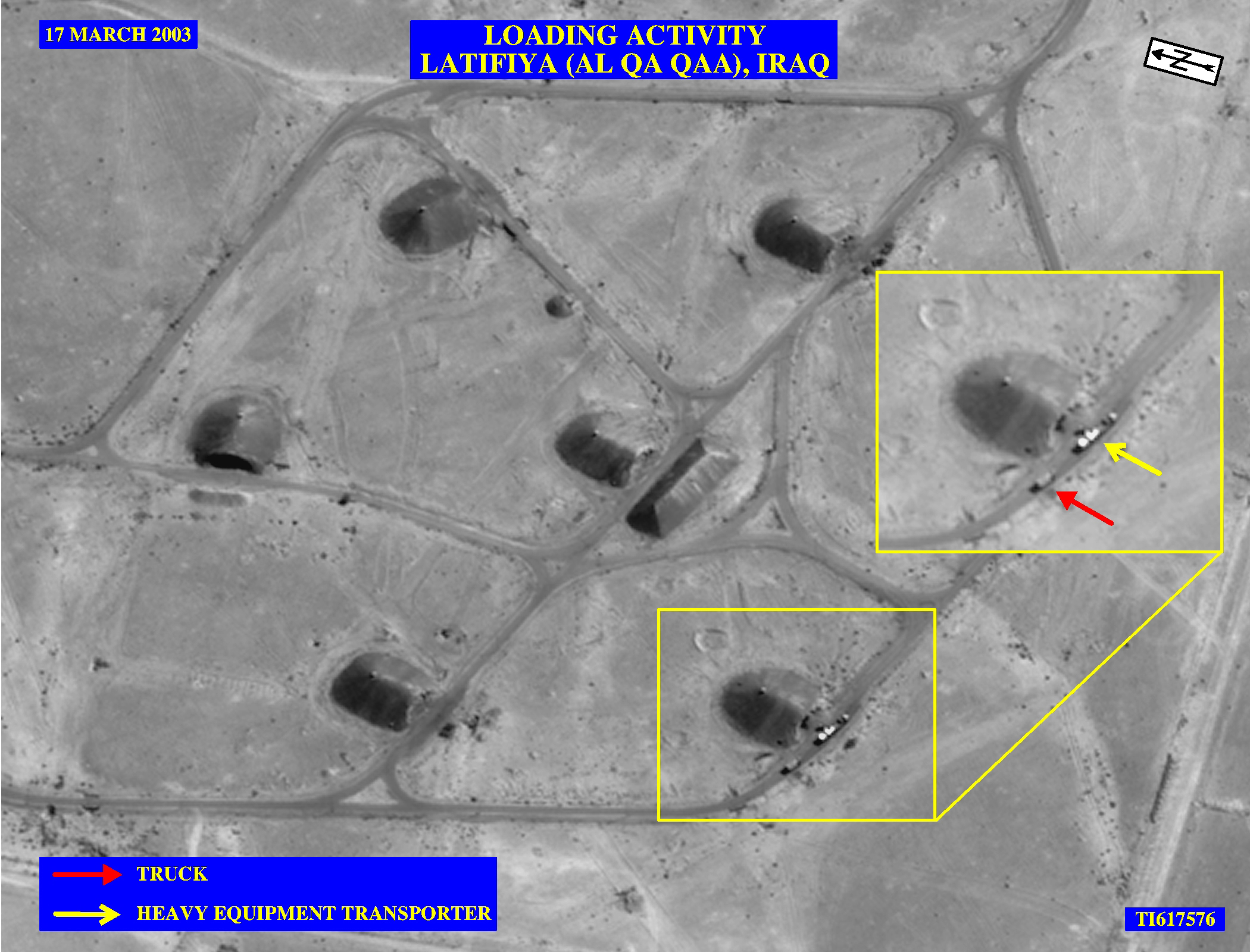
A U.S. government aerial photo of munitions bunkers at Al Qa'qaa, 17 March 2003

The Al Qa'qaa' State Establishment (Arabic: القعقاع al-Qa’qā’; also Romanized al Qa Qaa, al Qa'qa) was a massive weapons facility 48 kilometres (30 miles) south of Baghdad. It is near to the towns of Yusifiyah and Iskandariya at the geographic coordinates 33°0′54″N 44°13′12″E. Covering an area of over 28 km^{2} (11 sq mi), the site comprises 116 separate factories and over 1,100 structures of various kinds. It is now disused and many of the buildings have been destroyed by bombing, looting and accidental explosions. In October 2004, the facility became the centre of international attention after a UN agency reported hundreds of tonnes of stored explosives "missing" (see Al Qa'qaa high explosives controversy).

== Origins of Al Qa'qaa ==
Al Qa'qaa was built in the 1970s with most of the equipment coming from Germany and Yugoslavia. It was completed in 1981, just in time to meet the demands of the Iran–Iraq War. Under the regime of Saddam Hussein the facility was a key agency of the Iraqi Ministry of Industry and Military Industrialization. It included plants for producing solid-propellant rockets and ammunition. The complex also included factories producing steel, aluminium, and centrifuges. It was Iraq's principal production facility for specialist explosives, notably RDX and HDX.

The facility was named after a distinguished soldier in the army of the 7th century Caliph Umar ibn al-Khattab, of whom it was said "the voice of Al Qa'qaa in an army is better than one thousand fighters." By analogy, as Saddam Hussein explained in a visit on May 23, 2001, the workers at Al Qa'qaa were equivalent to a far greater number of their enemies:

"Every Iraqi works in the same way Caliph Umar Ibn-al-Khattab used to work with when the commander, who led the Muslims' army on Iraq's front, to back him with several thousands of fighters. So, he sent him four fighters only, including Al-Qa'qaa. He considered each one of these fighters equal to 1,000 fighters. Had the Iraqis not worked in this way and with spirit now, they would not have achieved, with this small number, what was not achieved by others who outnumber them."

== Al Qa'qaa and Iraq's weapons of mass destruction ==
The Al Qa'qaa plant was heavily involved in Iraq's clandestine program to produce weapons of mass destruction, with its workers' expertise in explosives being used to develop explosive lenses for nuclear weapons. Iraq's program suffered serious setbacks due to the Israeli destruction of the experimental reactor at Osirak in June 1981 and a massive accidental explosion at Al Qa'Qaa in August 1989, which severely damaged the plant and was heard hundreds of miles away. British-Iraqi journalist Farzad Bazoft attempted to investigate the incident by disguising himself as a medical technician in order to infiltrate Al Qa'qaa. However, he was caught and executed on charges related to his visit.

In March 1990, customs officials at Heathrow Airport in London seized a case of military electrical capacitors - key components of triggers for explosive lenses - which was bound for Al Qa'qaa. The United States subsequently charged five people and two British companies with violations of export regulations.

During the 1991 Gulf War the facility was severely damaged by bombing. After the war, the UN weapons inspectors UNSCOM further destroyed and sealed weapons and facilities at the base. However, part of the base was rebuilt and attracted concern from Western countries. In September 2002, the plant was named by the British Government in Iraq's Weapons of Mass Destruction (the "September Dossier") as being the site of a rebuilt phosgene production facility. Although phosgene has industrial uses in small quantities, there are no legitimate nonmilitary uses for such large scale production, and it is capable of being used as a chemical weapon, as was done by Germany in World War I. The British and Americans also alleged that a large consignment of 81 mm aluminium tubes delivered to the plant were to be used as rotors in centrifuges to produce enriched uranium.

IAEA officials inspected the site at least ten times in 2002 and 2003 but discovered no weapons of mass destruction. The aluminium tubes did exist, but they were determined to be for short-range artillery rockets (which Iraq was allowed to possess). The inspectors left the country in mid-March 2003 shortly before the US-led invasion of Iraq. They sealed the bunkers where explosives were stored, but were not permitted to return after the United States took control.

The Al Qa'qaa high explosives controversy is over the question of when the IAEA-sealed explosives were removed from their bunkers; whether it happened before, during or after the invasion of Iraq.

== List of facilities at al-Qa'qaa ==
- Qa Qaa Stores (former location of HMX explosives)
- Aqql Mamoun (missile production)
- Sumood Explosives Plant
- AWADAAl Qaid Warhead-Filling Factory
- Static Test Stands
- Research and Development Centre
- Latifiyah Explosives and Ammunition Plant
- Latifiyah Phosgene and solid propellant production facility
- Latifiyah Missile and Rocket facility
- Sulfuric Acid plant
- Nitric Acid Factory

== See also ==
- Al Qa'qaa high explosives controversy
