= GlobalSecurity.org =

American defense think tank and website

- Formation: December 2000; 25 years ago
- Founder: John E. Pike
- Headquarters: 300 N. Washington Street; Alexandria, Virginia, US
- Official language: English
- Director: John E. Pike
- Website: www.globalsecurity.org
- Remarks: ISSN 2769-8947

GlobalSecurity.org is an American independent, nonpartisan, nonprofit organization that serves as a think tank, and research and consultancy group.

== Focus ==
The site is focused on national and international security issues; military analysis, systems, and strategies; intelligence matters; and space policy.

== History ==
It was founded in December 2000 by John Pike, who had worked since 1983 with the Federation of American Scientists, where he directed the space policy, cyberstrategy, military analysis, nuclear resource, and intelligence resource projects. GlobalSecurity.org is headquartered in the Washington, D.C. metropolitan area in Alexandria, Virginia, and Pike remains as its director.

The website's target audience includes journalists, policy-makers, scholars, political scientists, military and defense personnel, and the public. It supplies background information and developing news stories, providing online analysis and articles that analyze what are sometimes little-discussed topics in categories that include WMDs, military and defense, security and cybersecurity, intelligence, and space technology. It also disseminates primary documentation and other original materials, provides detailed, high-resolution satellite images and video footage from war zones, and provides definitions of widely used terms for the public. The organization also serves as a defense, military, foreign policy, and national-security watchdog group.

In part it seeks to find new approaches to international security, and promotes achieving cooperative international security and preventing nuclear proliferation. To this end it seeks to improve intelligence-community capabilities to respond to new threats and to prevent the need for military action, while at the same time enhancing the effectiveness of military forces when needed.

GlobalSecurity.org was listed in the War Intelligence category of Forbes' now-defunct "Best of the Web" directory from 2001 onward; the directory cited its "Depth of military information", and noted its "collection of satellite images and video footage from the war zone". In his 2004 book Plan of Attack, about the behind-the-scenes decision-making that led the Bush administration to invade Iraq, Bob Woodward called the website "an invaluable resource on military, intelligence and national security matters".
