= Last Supper =

Meal that Jesus shared with apostles before crucifixion

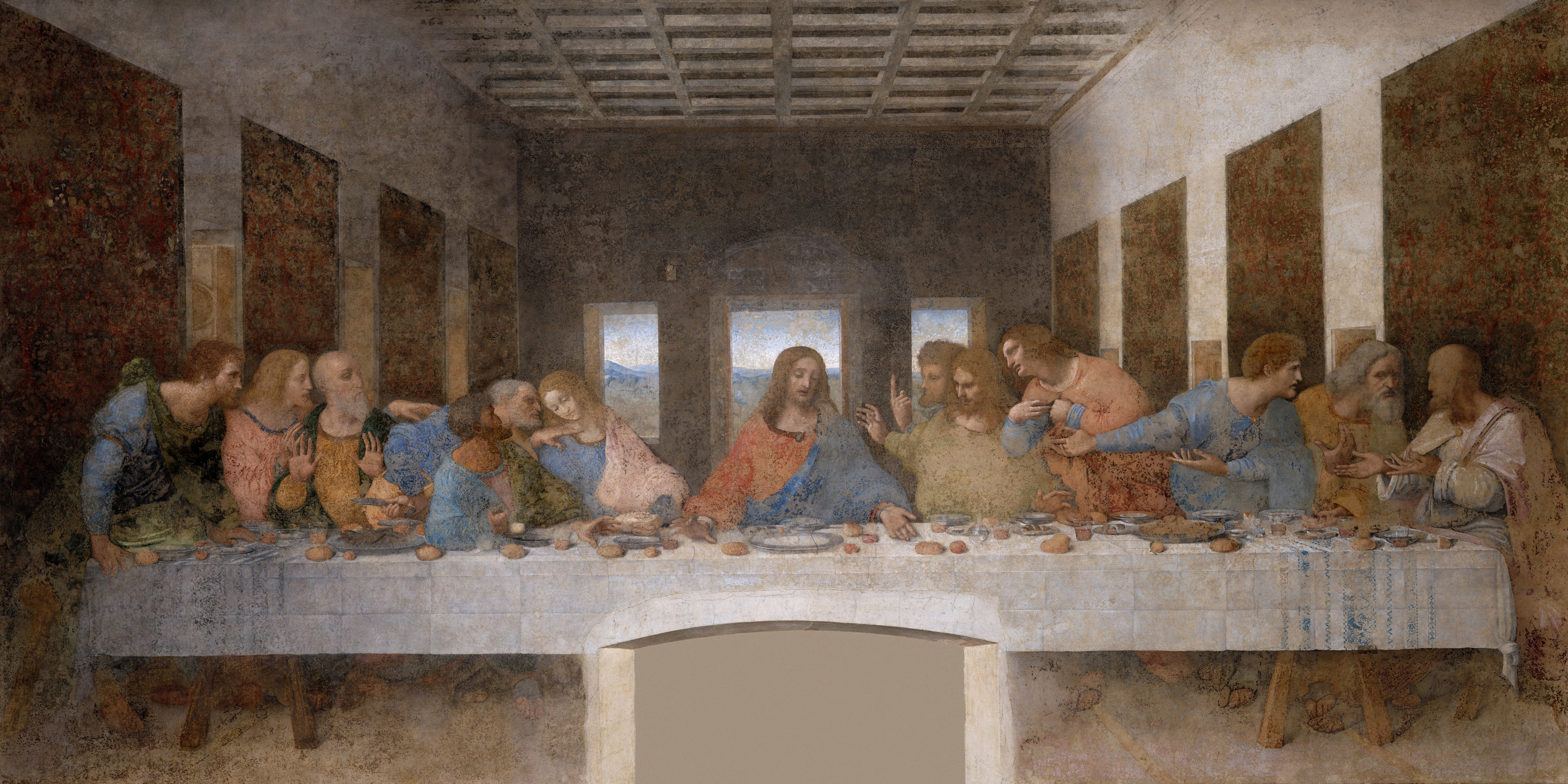
The Last Supper (1495–1498). Depictions of the Last Supper in Christian art have been undertaken by artistic masters for centuries, Leonardo da Vinci's late-1490s mural painting being the best-known example. (Clickable image—use cursor to identify.)

The Last Supper is the final meal that, in the Gospel accounts, Jesus shared with his apostles in Jerusalem before his crucifixion. The Last Supper is commemorated by Christians especially on Holy Thursday. The Last Supper provides the scriptural basis for the Eucharist, also known as "Holy Communion" or "The Lord's Supper". Jesus having a final meal with his disciples is almost beyond dispute among scholars, and belongs to the framework of the narrative of Jesus' life.

The New Testament mentions the Last Supper in five of its books. The First Epistle to the Corinthians (1 Corinthians 11:23–25) contains the earliest known mention. The four canonical gospels state that the Last Supper took place in the week of Passover, days after Jesus's triumphal entry into Jerusalem, and before Jesus was crucified on Good Friday (Matthew 26:17–29; Mark 14:12–25; Luke 22:7–38). During the meal, Jesus predicts his betrayal by one of the apostles present, and foretells that before the next morning, Peter will thrice deny knowing him.

The three Synoptic Gospels and the First Epistle to the Corinthians include the account of the institution of the Eucharist in which Jesus takes bread, breaks it and gives it to those present, saying "This is my body given to you". The Gospel of John tells of Jesus washing the feet of the apostles, giving the new commandment "to love one another as I have loved you", and includes the detailed Farewell Discourse by Jesus, calling the apostles who follow his teachings "friends and not servants", as he prepares them for his departure.

Some scholars have looked to the Last Supper as the source of early Christian Eucharistic traditions. Others see the account of the Last Supper as derived from 1st-century Eucharistic practice as described by Paul in the mid-50s.

== Terminology ==
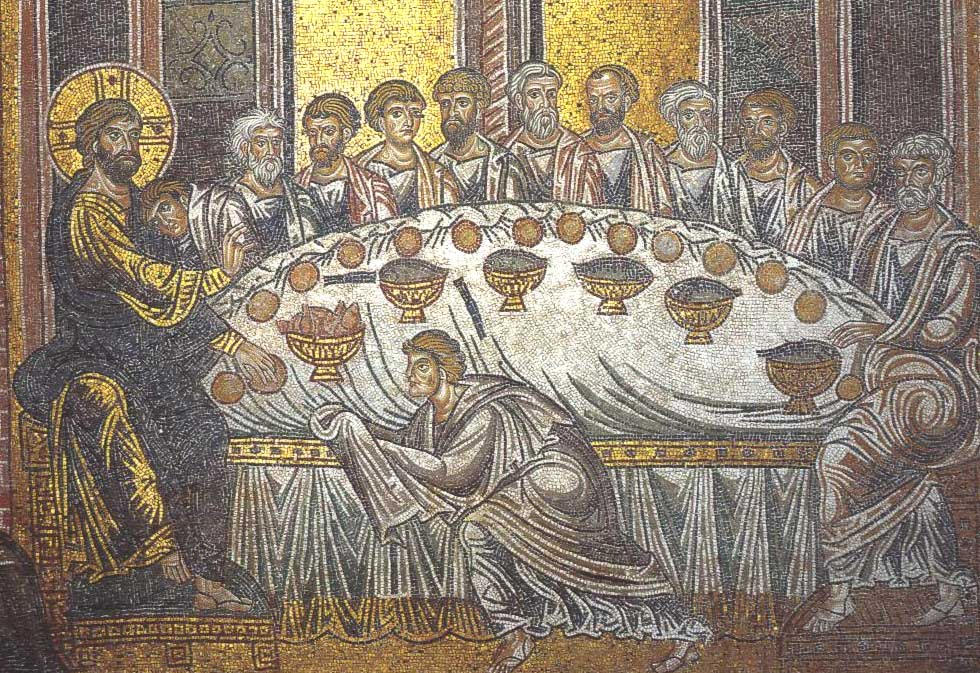
Last Supper, Monreale Cathedral mosaics (Palermo, Sicily, Italy)

The term "Last Supper" does not appear in the New Testament, but traditionally many Christians refer to such an event. The term "Lord's Supper" refers both to the biblical event and the act of "Holy Communion" and Eucharistic ("thanksgiving") celebration within their liturgy. Evangelical Protestants also use the term "Lord's Supper", but most do not use the terms "Eucharist" or the word "Holy" with the name "Communion".

The Eastern Orthodox use the term "Mystical Supper" which refers both to the biblical event and the act of Eucharistic celebration within liturgy. The Russian Orthodox also use the term "Secret Supper" (Church Slavonic: "Тайная вечеря", Taynaya vecherya).

== Scriptural basis ==
The last meal that Jesus shared with his apostles is described in all four canonical Gospels as having taken place in the week of the Passover. This meal later became known as the Last Supper. The Last Supper was likely a retelling of the events of the last meal of Jesus among the early Christian community, and became a ritual which recounted that meal.

Paul's First Epistle to the Corinthians, which was likely written before the Gospels, includes a reference to the Last Supper but emphasizes the theological basis rather than giving a detailed description of the event or its background.

=== Background and setting ===
The overall narrative that is shared in all Gospel accounts that leads to the Last Supper is that after the triumphal entry into Jerusalem early in the week, and encounters with various people and the Jewish elders, Jesus and his disciples share a meal towards the end of the week. After the meal, Jesus is betrayed, arrested, tried, and then crucified.

Key events in the meal are the preparation of the disciples for the departure of Jesus, the predictions about the impending betrayal of Jesus, and the foretelling of the upcoming denial of Jesus by Apostle Peter.

=== Prediction of Judas' betrayal ===
In Matthew 26:24–25, Mark 14:18–21, Luke 22:21–23 and John 13:21–30, during the meal, Jesus predicted that one of the apostles present would betray him. Jesus is described as reiterating, despite each apostle's assertion that he would not betray Jesus, that the betrayer would be one of those who were present, and saying that there would be "woe to the man who betrays the Son of man! It would be better for him if he had not been born."

In Matthew 26:23–25 and John 13:26–27, Judas is specifically identified as the traitor. In the Gospel of John, when asked about the traitor, Jesus states:

"It is the one to whom I will give this piece of bread when I have dipped it in the dish." Then, dipping the piece of bread, he gave it to Judas, the son of Simon Iscariot. As soon as Judas took the bread, Satan entered into him.

— Evans 2003, pp. 465–477 Fahlbusch 2005, pp. 52–56

=== Institution of the Eucharist ===
The three Synoptic Gospel accounts describe the Last Supper as a Passover meal. Stéphane Saulnier argues they disagree with John, though Brant Pitre argues the Gospels can be reconciled in his "Passover hypothesis", taking the Gospel of John's allusions to the Passover lamb as applying to the seven-day festival rather than the meal. In chapter 26 of the Gospel of Matthew, Jesus prays thanks for the bread, divides it, and hands the pieces of bread to his disciples, saying "Take, eat, this is my body." Later in the meal Jesus takes a cup of wine, offers another prayer, and gives it to those present, saying "Drink from it, all of you; for this is my blood of the covenant, which is poured out for many for the forgiveness of sins. I tell you, I will never again drink of this fruit of the vine until that day when I drink it new with you in my Father's kingdom."

In chapter 22 of the Gospel of Luke, the wine is blessed and distributed before the bread, followed by the bread, then by a second, larger cup of wine. Each gospel account has different wordings, though the evangelists used each other more conservatively than contemporary biographers like Plutarch. According to Paul and Luke, he tells the disciples "do this in remembrance of me." This event has been regarded by most denominations as the institution of the Eucharist. There is recorded celebration of the Eucharist by the early Christians in Jerusalem.

The institution of the Eucharist is recorded in the Synoptic Gospels and the First Epistle to the Corinthians. Luke 22:19b–20 is a disputed text which does not appear in some early manuscripts of Luke. Some scholars believe that it is an interpolation, while others have argued that it is original.

A comparison of the accounts given in the Gospels and 1 Corinthians is shown in the table below, with text from the ASV. The disputed text from Luke 22:19b–20 is in italics.

Mark 14:22–24	And as they were eating, he took bread, and when he had blessed, he brake it, and gave to them, and said, Take ye: this is my body. And he took a cup, and when he had given thanks, he gave to them: and they all drank of it. And he said unto them, 'This is my blood of the covenant, which is poured out for many.'
Matthew 26:26–28	And as they were eating, Jesus took bread, and blessed, and brake it; and he gave to the disciples, and said, 'Take, eat; this is my body.' And he took a cup, and gave thanks, and gave to them, saying, 'Drink ye all of it; for this is my blood of the covenant, which is poured out for many unto remission of sins.'
1 Corinthians 11:23–25	For I received of the Lord that which also I delivered unto you, that the Lord Jesus in the night in which he was betrayed took bread; and when he had given thanks, he brake it, and said, 'This is my body, which is for you: this do in remembrance of me.' In like manner also the cup, after supper, saying, 'This cup is the new covenant in my blood: this do, as often as ye drink it, in remembrance of me.'
Luke 22:19–20	And he took bread, and when he had given thanks, he brake it, and gave to them, saying, 'This is my body which is given for you: this do in remembrance of me.' And the cup in like manner after supper, saying, 'This cup is the new covenant in my blood, even that which is poured out for you.'

Jesus' actions in sharing the bread and wine have been linked with Isaiah 53:12 which refers to a blood sacrifice that, as recounted in Exodus 24:8, Moses offered in order to seal a covenant with God. Some scholars interpret the description of Jesus' action as asking his disciples to consider themselves part of a sacrifice, where Jesus is the one due to physically undergo it.

Although the Gospel of John does not include a description of the bread and wine ritual during the Last Supper, most scholars agree that John 6:58–59 (the Bread of Life Discourse) has a Eucharistic nature and resonates with the "words of institution" used in the Synoptic Gospels and the Pauline writings on the Last Supper.

=== Prediction of Peter's denial ===
In Matthew 26:33–35, Mark 14:29–31, Luke 22:33–34 and John 13:36–38, Jesus predicts that Peter will deny knowledge of him, stating that Peter will disown him three times before the rooster crows the next morning. The Synoptic Gospels mention that after the arrest of Jesus, Peter denied knowing him three times, but after the third denial, heard the rooster crow and recalled the prediction as Jesus turned to look at him. Peter then began to cry bitterly.

=== Elements unique to the Gospel of John ===
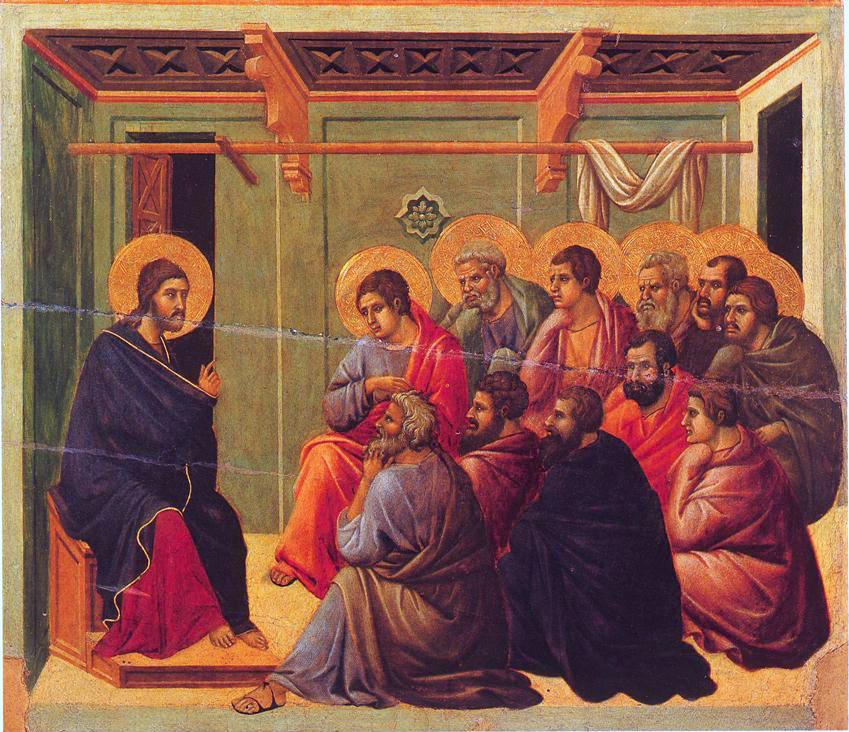
Jesus giving the Farewell Discourse to his eleven remaining disciples, from the Maesta by Duccio, 1308–1311

John 13 includes the account of the washing the feet of the Apostles by Jesus before the meal. In this episode, Apostle Peter objects and does not want to allow Jesus to wash his feet, but Jesus answers him, "Unless I wash you, you have no part with me", after which Peter agrees.

In the Gospel of John, after the departure of Judas from the Last Supper, Jesus tells his remaining disciples that he will be with them for only a short time, then gives them a New Commandment, stating: "A new command I give you: Love one another. As I have loved you, so you must love one another. By this everyone will know that you are my disciples if you love one another." Two similar statements also appear later in John 15:12: "My command is this: Love each other as I have loved you", and John 15:17: "This is my command: Love each other."

At the Last Supper in the Gospel of John, Jesus gives an extended sermon to his disciples. This discourse resembles farewell speeches called testaments, in which a father or religious leader, often on the deathbed, leaves instructions for his children or followers.

This sermon is referred to as the Farewell Discourse of Jesus, and has historically been considered a source of Christian doctrine, particularly on the subject of Christology. John 17:1–26 is generally known as the Farewell Prayer or the High Priestly Prayer, given that it is an intercession for the coming Church. The prayer begins with Jesus's petition for his glorification by the Father, given that completion of his work and continues to an intercession for the success of the works of his disciples and the community of his followers.

== Time and place ==
=== Date ===
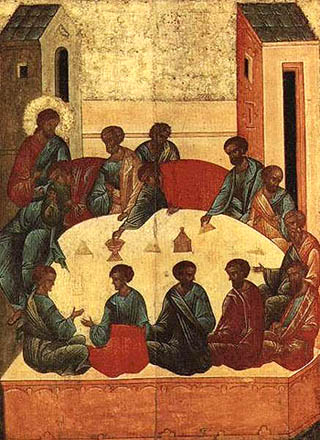
13th century Orthodox Russian icon from 1497

Historians estimate that the date of the crucifixion fell in the range AD 30–36. Isaac Newton and Colin Humphreys have ruled out the years 31, 32, 35, and 36 on astronomical grounds, leaving 7 April AD 30 and 3 April AD 33 as possible crucifixion dates. Humphreys 2011, pp. 72, 189 proposes narrowing down the date of the Last Supper as having occurred in the evening of Wednesday, 1 April AD 33, by revising Annie Jaubert's double-Passover theory.

Historically, various attempts to reconcile the three synoptic accounts with John have been made, some of which are indicated in the Last Supper by Francis Mershman in the 1912 Catholic Encyclopedia. The Maundy Thursday church tradition assumes that the Last Supper was held on the evening before the crucifixion day (although, strictly speaking, in no Gospel is it unequivocally said that this meal took place on the night before Jesus died).

A new approach to resolve this contrast was undertaken in the wake of the excavations at Qumran in the 1950s when Annie Jaubert argued that there were two Passover feast dates: while the official Jewish lunar calendar had Passover begin on a Friday evening in the year that Jesus died, a solar calendar was also used, for instance by the Essene community at Qumran, which always had the Passover feast begin on a Tuesday evening. According to Jaubert, Jesus would have celebrated the Passover on Tuesday, and the Jewish authorities three days later, on Friday. Humphreys has disagreed with Jaubert's proposal on the grounds that the Qumran solar Passover would always fall after the official Jewish lunar Passover. He agrees with the approach of two Passover dates, and argues that the Last Supper took place on the evening of Wednesday 1 April 33, based on his recent discovery of the Essene, Samaritan, and Zealot lunar calendar, which is based on Egyptian reckoning.

In a review of Humphreys' book, the Bible scholar William R Telford points out that the non-astronomical parts of his argument are based on the assumption that the chronologies described in the New Testament are historical and based on eyewitness testimony. In doing so, Telford says, Humphreys has built an argument upon unsound premises which "does violence to the nature of the biblical texts, whose mixture of fact and fiction, tradition and redaction, history and myth all make the rigid application of the scientific tool of astronomy to their putative data a misconstrued enterprise."

=== Location ===
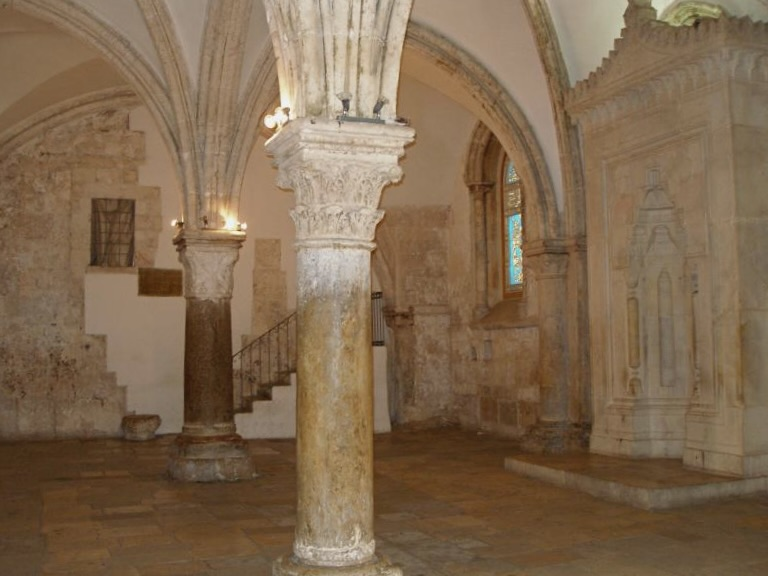
The Cenacle on Mount Zion, claimed to be the location of the Last Supper and Pentecost.

According to later tradition, the Last Supper took place in what is today called The Room of the Last Supper on Mount Zion, just outside the walls of the Old City of Jerusalem, and is traditionally known as The Upper Room. This is based on the account in the Synoptic Gospels that states that Jesus had instructed two disciples (Luke 22:8 specifies that Jesus sent Peter and John) to go to "the city" to meet "a man carrying a jar of water", who would lead them to a house, where they would find "a large upper room furnished and ready". In this upper room they "prepare the Passover".

No more specific indication of the location is given in the New Testament, and the "city" referred to may be a suburb of Jerusalem, such as Bethany, rather than Jerusalem itself.

A structure on Mount Zion in Jerusalem is currently called the Cenacle and is purported to be the location of the Last Supper. Bargil Pixner claims the original site is located beneath the current structure of the Cenacle on Mount Zion.

The traditional location is in an area that, according to archaeology, had a large Essene community, a point made by scholars who suspect a link between Jesus and the group.

Saint Mark's Syrian Orthodox Church in Jerusalem is another possible site for the room in which the Last Supper was held, and contains a Christian stone inscription testifying to early reverence for that spot. Certainly the room they have is older than that of the current cenaculum (crusader – 12th century) and as the room is now underground the relative altitude is correct (the streets of 1st century Jerusalem were at least twelve feet (3.7 metres) lower than those of today, so any true building of that time would have even its upper story currently under the earth). They also have a revered Icon of the Virgin Mary, reputedly painted from life by St Luke.

== Theology of the Last Supper ==
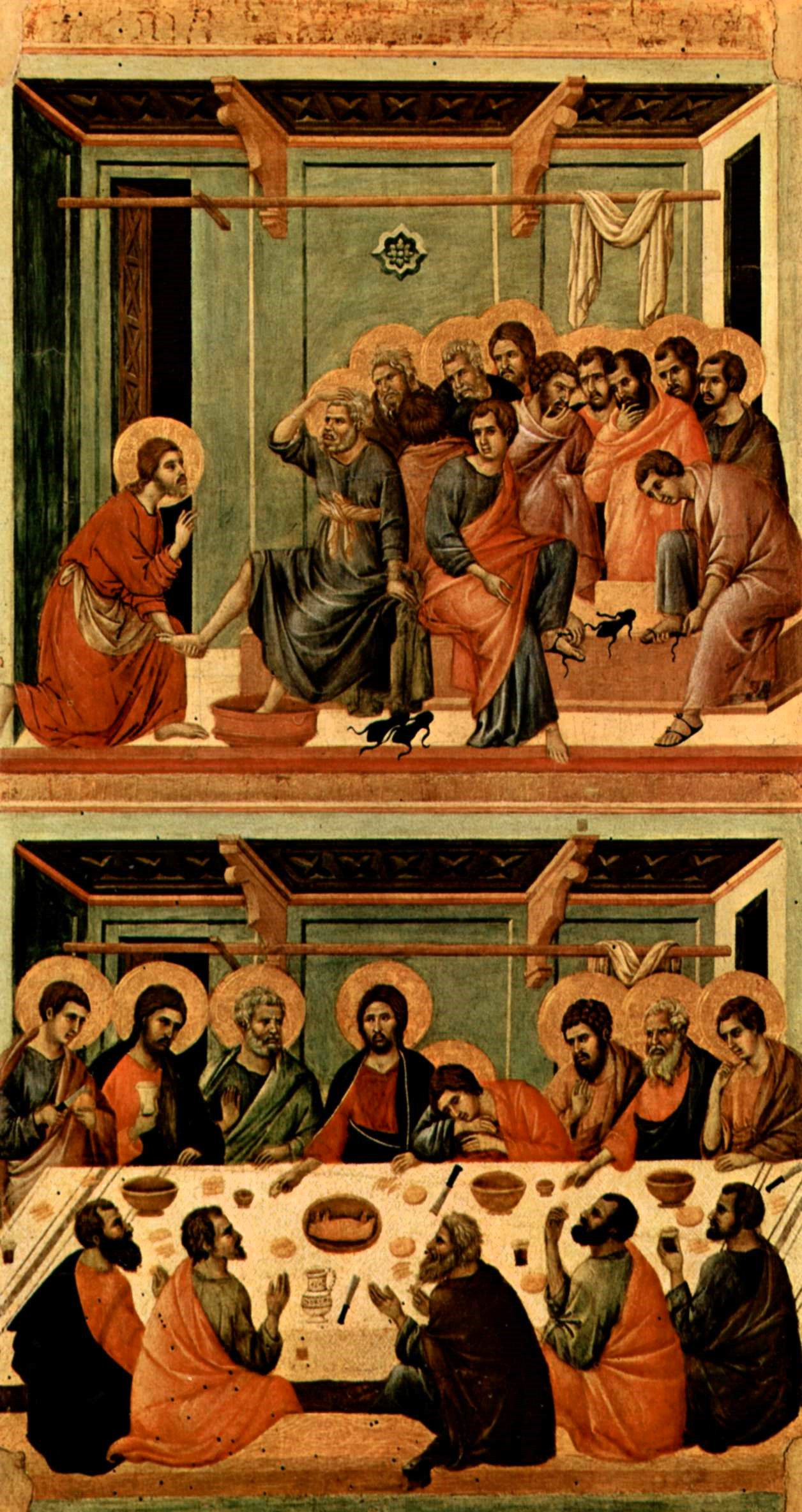
The Washing of Feet and the Supper, from the Maesta by Duccio, 1308–1311.

Peter often displays amazement in feet washing depictions, as in John 13:8. St. Thomas Aquinas viewed The Father, Christ, and the Holy Spirit as teachers and masters who provide lessons, at times by example. For Aquinas, the Last Supper and the Cross form the summit of the teaching that wisdom flows from intrinsic grace, rather than external power. For Aquinas, at the Last Supper Christ taught by example, showing the value of humility (as reflected in John's foot washing narrative) and self-sacrifice, rather than by exhibiting external, miraculous powers.

Aquinas stated that based on John 15:15 (in the Farewell Discourse), in which Jesus said: "No longer do I call you servants; ... but I have called you friends", those who are followers of Christ and partake in the sacrament of the Eucharist become his friends, as do those gathered at the table of the Last Supper. For Aquinas, at the Last Supper Christ made the promise to be present in the sacrament of the Eucharist, and to be with those who partake in it, as he was with his disciples at the Last Supper.

John Calvin believed only in the two sacraments of Baptism and the "Lord's Supper" (i.e., Eucharist). Thus, his analysis of the Gospel accounts of the Last Supper was an important part of his entire theology. Calvin related the Synoptic Gospel accounts of the Last Supper with the Bread of Life Discourse in John 6:35 that states: "I am the bread of life. He who comes to me will never go hungry."

Calvin also believed that the acts of Jesus at the Last Supper should be followed as an example, stating that just as Jesus gave thanks to the Father before breaking the bread, those who go to the Lord's table to receive the sacrament of the Eucharist must give thanks for the "boundless love of God" and celebrate the sacrament with both joy and thanksgiving.

== Remembrances ==
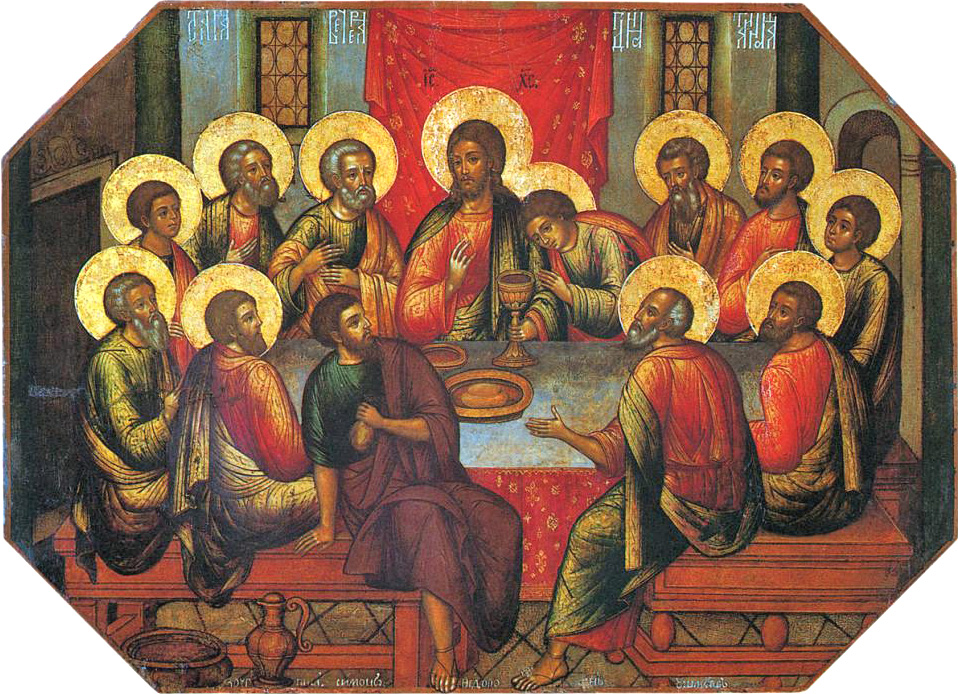
Simon Ushakov's icon of the Mystical Supper, 1685

The institution of the Eucharist at the Last Supper is remembered by Roman Catholics as one of the Luminous Mysteries of the Rosary, the First Station of a so-called New Way of the Cross and by Christians as the "inauguration of the New Covenant", mentioned by the prophet Jeremiah, fulfilled at the last supper when Jesus "took bread, and after blessing it broke it and gave it to them, and said, 'Take; this is my body.' And he took a cup, and when he had given thanks he gave it to them, and they all drank of it. And he said to them, 'This is my blood of the covenant, which is poured out for many.'" Other Christian groups consider the Bread and Wine remembrance to be a change to the Passover ceremony, as Jesus Christ has become "our Passover, sacrificed for us", and hold that partaking of the Passover Communion (or fellowship) is now the sign of the New Covenant, when properly understood by the practicing believer.

These meals evolved into more formal worship services and became codified as the Mass in the Catholic Church, and as the Divine Liturgy in the Eastern Orthodox Church; at these liturgies, Catholics and Eastern Orthodox celebrate the Sacrament of the Eucharist. The name "Eucharist" is from the Greek word εὐχαριστία (eucharistia) which means "thanksgiving".

Early Christianity observed a ritual meal known as the "agape feast" (Note: Agape is one of the four main Greek words for love (Lewis 1960). It refers to the idealised or high-level unconditional love rather than lust, friendship, or affection (as in parental affection). Though Christians interpret Agape as meaning a divine form of love beyond human forms, in modern Greek the term is used in the sense of "I love you" (romantic love).) These "love feasts" were apparently a full meal, with each participant bringing food, and with the meal eaten in a common room. They were held on Sundays, which became known as the Lord's Day, to recall the resurrection, the appearance of Christ to the disciples on the road to Emmaus, the appearance to Thomas and the Pentecost which all took place on Sundays after the Passion.

== Passover parallels ==
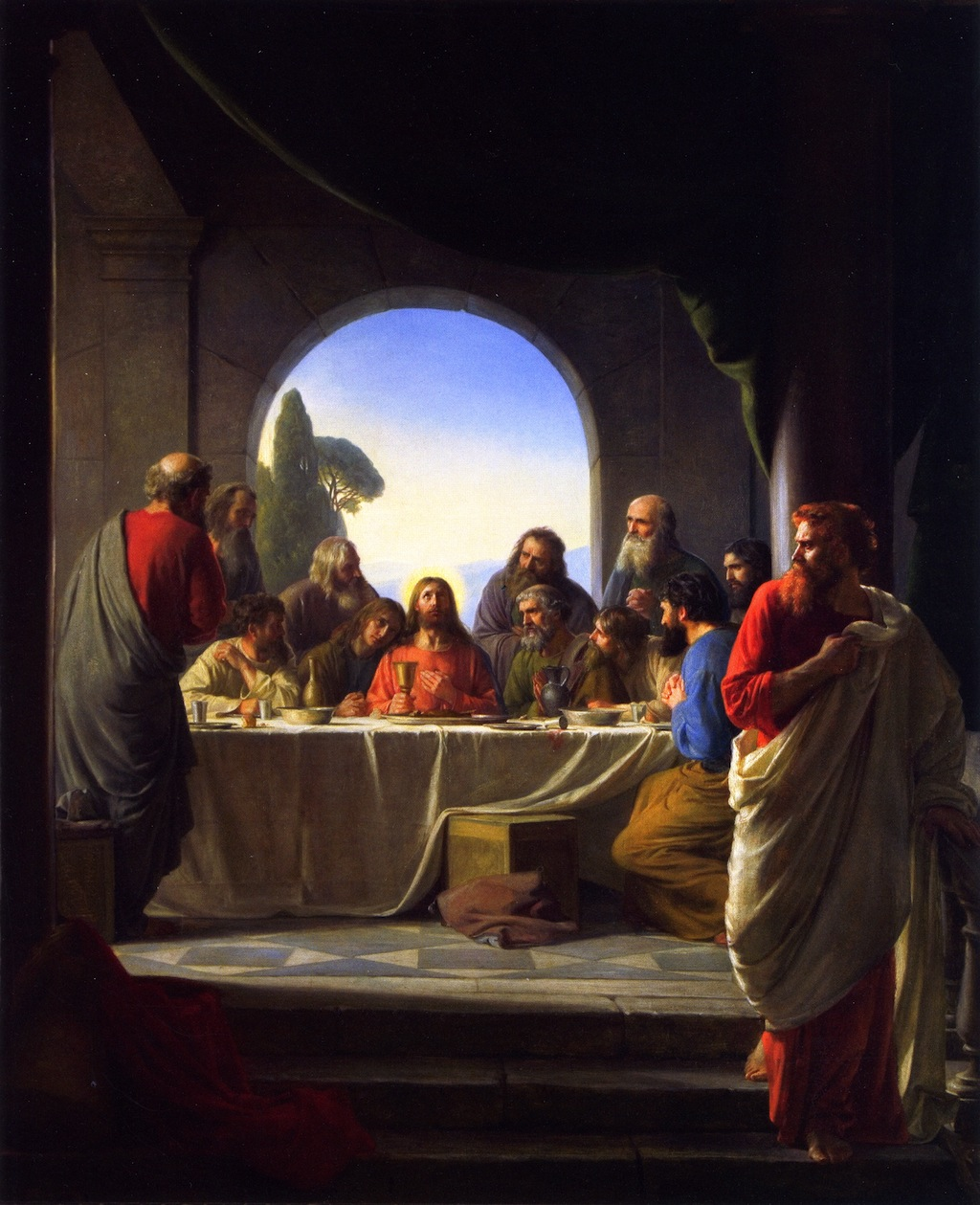
Last Supper, Carl Bloch. In some depictions John the Apostle is placed on the right side of Jesus, some to the left.

Since the late 20th century, with growing consciousness of the Jewish character of the early church and the improvement of Jewish-Christian relations, it became common among some evangelical groups to borrow Seder customs, like Haggadahs, and incorporated them in new rituals meant to mimic the Last Supper. As the earliest elements in the current Passover Seder (a fortiori the full-fledged ritual, which is first recorded in full only in the ninth century) are a rabbinic enactment instituted in remembrance of the Temple, which was still standing during the Last Supper, the Seder in Jesus' time would have been celebrated quite differently, however.

== In Islam ==
The fifth chapter in the Quran, Al-Ma'ida (the table) contains a reference to a meal (Sura 5:114) with a table sent down from God to ʿĪsá (i.e., Jesus) and the apostles (Hawariyyin). However, there is nothing in Sura 5:114 to indicate that Jesus was celebrating that meal regarding his impending death, especially as the Quran states that Jesus was never crucified to begin with. Thus, although Sura 5:114 refers to a "meal", there is no indication that it is the Last Supper. However, some scholars believe that Jesus's manner of speech during which the table was sent down suggests that it was an affirmation of the apostles' resolves and to strengthen their faiths as the impending trial was about to befall them.

== Historicity ==
According to John P. Meier and E. P. Sanders, Jesus having a final meal with his disciples is almost beyond dispute among scholars, and belongs to the framework of the narrative of Jesus' life.

I. Howard Marshall states that any doubt about the historicity of the Last Supper should be abandoned.

Some Jesus Seminar scholars consider the Last Supper to have derived not from Jesus' last supper with the disciples but rather from the gentile tradition of memorial dinners for the dead. In their view, the Last Supper is a tradition associated mainly with the gentile churches that Paul established, rather than with the earlier, Jewish congregations. Such views echo that of 20th century Protestant theologian Rudolf Bultmann, who also believed the Eucharist to have originated in Gentile Christianity.

On the other hand, an increasing number of scholars have reasserted the historicity of the institution of the Eucharist, reinterpreting it from a Jewish eschatological point of view: according to Lutheran theologian Joachim Jeremias, for example, the Last Supper should be seen as a climax of a series of Messianic meals held by Jesus in anticipation of a new Exodus. Similar views are echoed in more recent works by Catholic biblical scholars such as John P. Meier and Brant Pitre, and by Anglican scholar N.T. Wright.

== Artistic depictions ==
The Last Supper has been a popular subject in Christian art. Such depictions date back to early Christianity and can be seen in the Catacombs of Rome. Byzantine artists frequently focused on the Apostles receiving Communion, rather than the reclining figures having a meal. By the Renaissance, the Last Supper was a favorite topic in Italian art.

There are three major themes in the depictions of the Last Supper: the first is the dramatic and dynamic depiction of Jesus's announcement of his betrayal. The second is the moment of the institution of the tradition of the Eucharist. The depictions here are generally solemn and mystical. The third major theme is the farewell of Jesus to his disciples, in which Judas Iscariot is no longer present, having left the supper. The depictions here are generally melancholy, as Jesus prepares his disciples for his departure. There are also other, less frequently depicted scenes, such as the washing of the feet of the disciples.

The best known depiction of the Last Supper is Leonardo da Vinci's The Last Supper, which is considered the first work of High Renaissance art, due to its high level of harmony.

Among other representations, Tintoretto's depiction is unusual in that it includes secondary characters carrying or taking the dishes from the table, and Salvador Dali's depiction combines the typical Christian themes with modern approaches of Surrealism.

Depictions of Last Supper

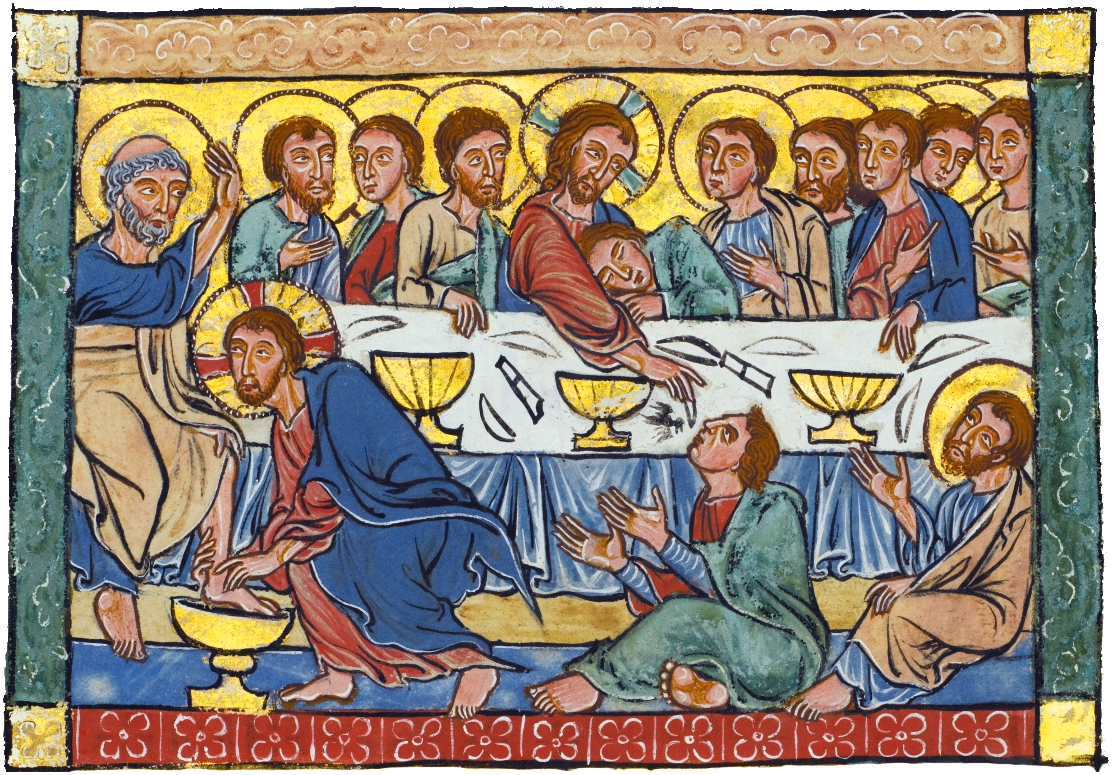
Miniature depiction from c. 1230

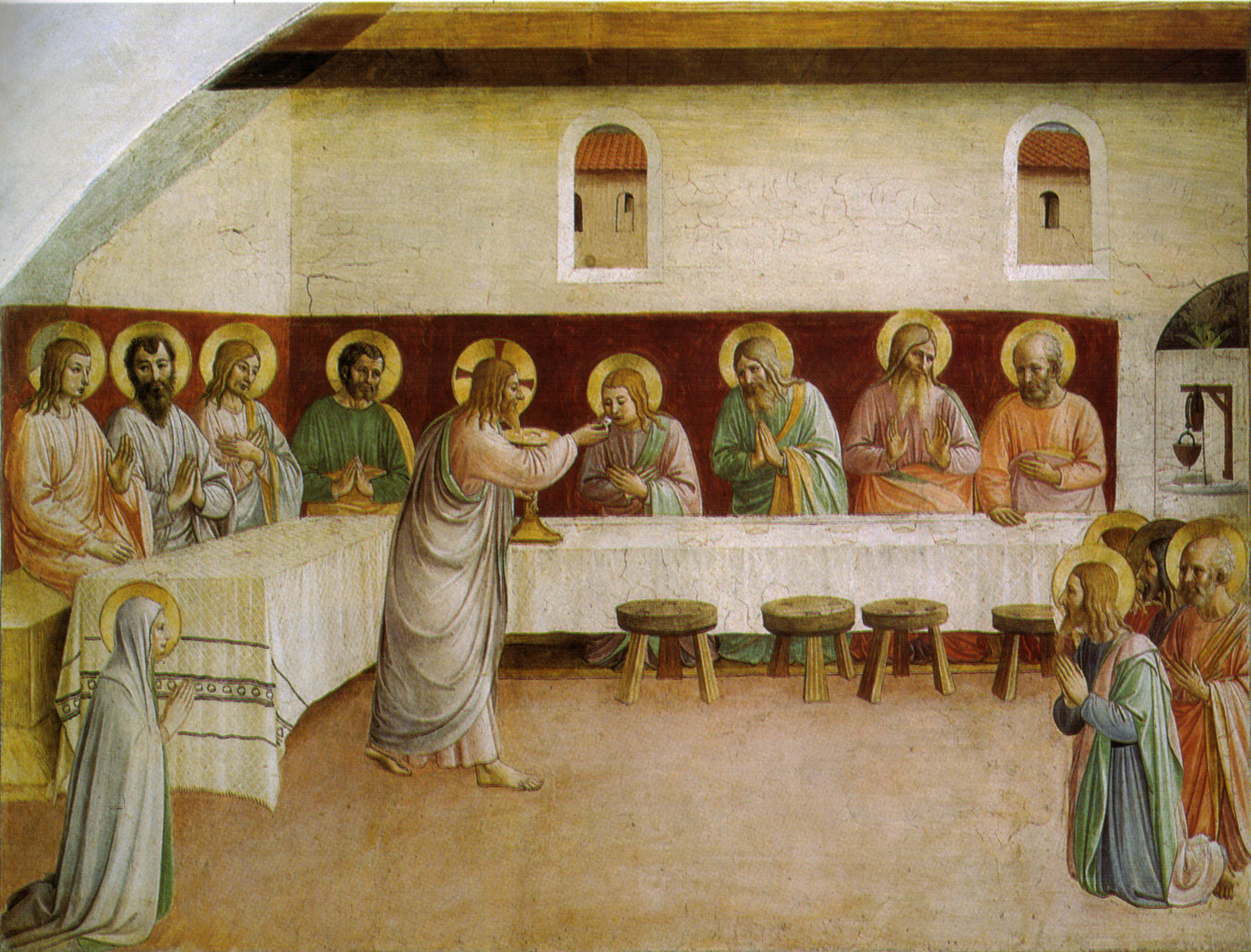
Communion of the Apostles, by Fra Angelico, with donor portrait, 1440–41

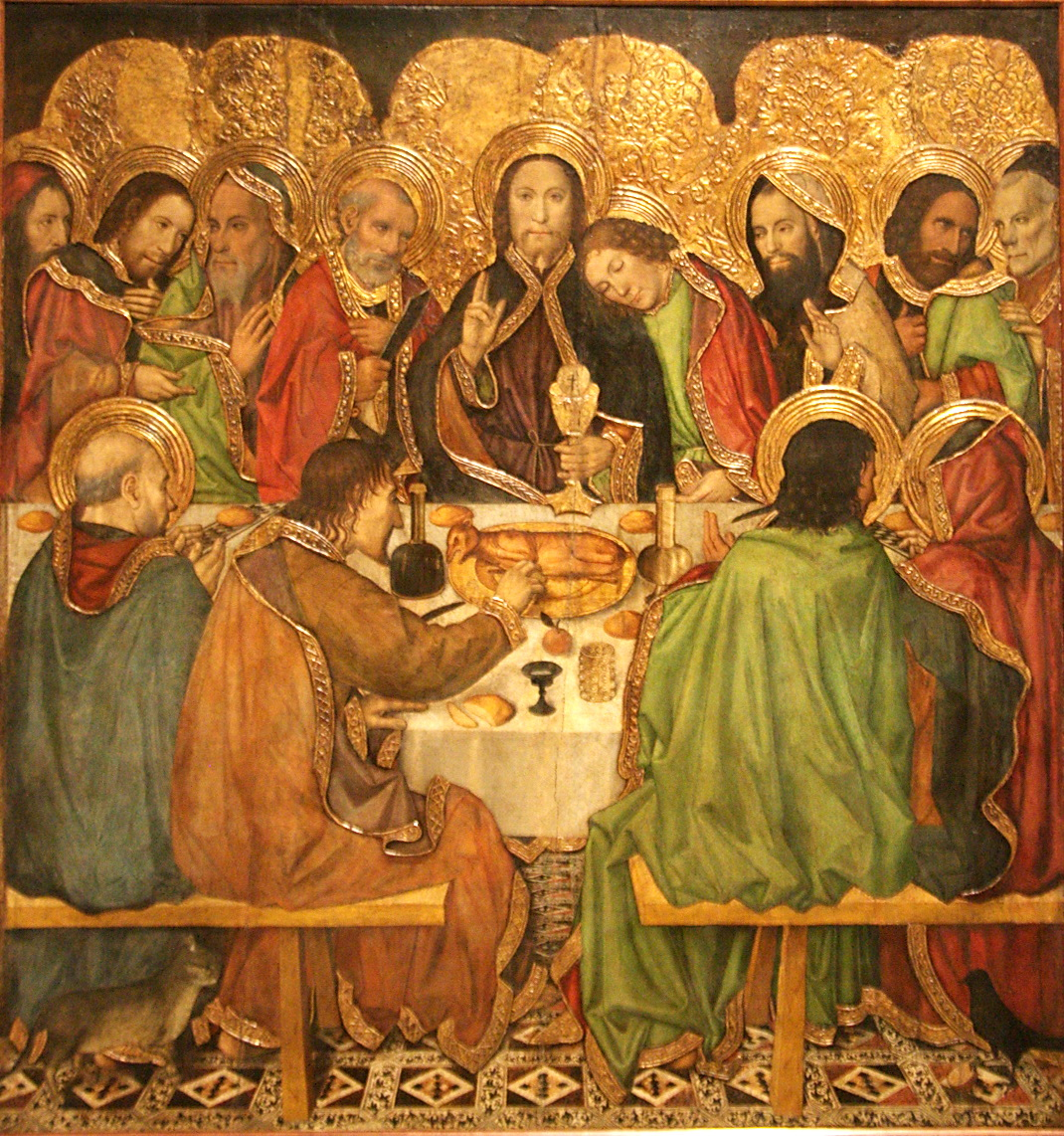
Last Supper, by Jaume Huguet, c. 1470

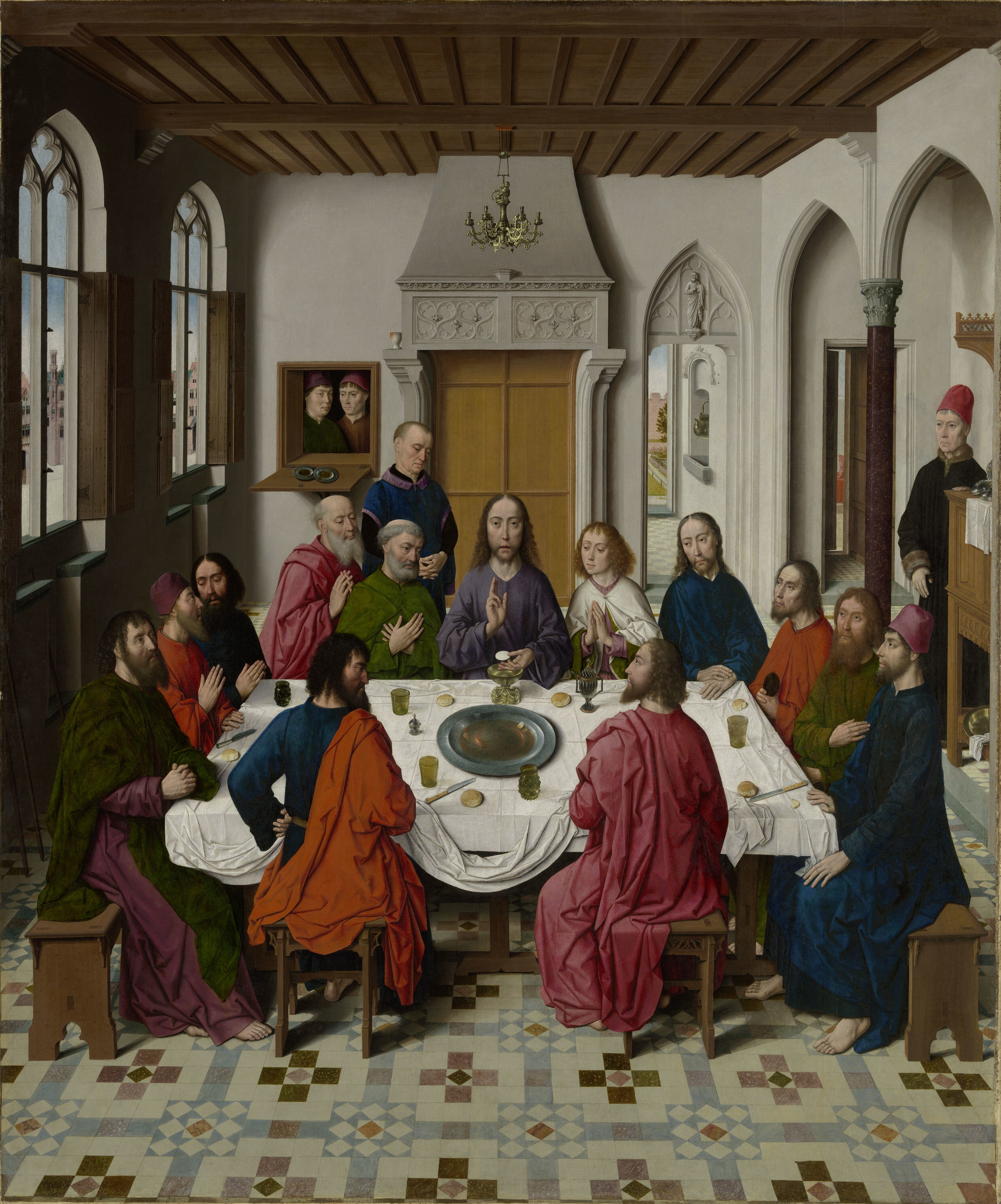
The Last Supper, by Dieric Bouts, 1464–1468

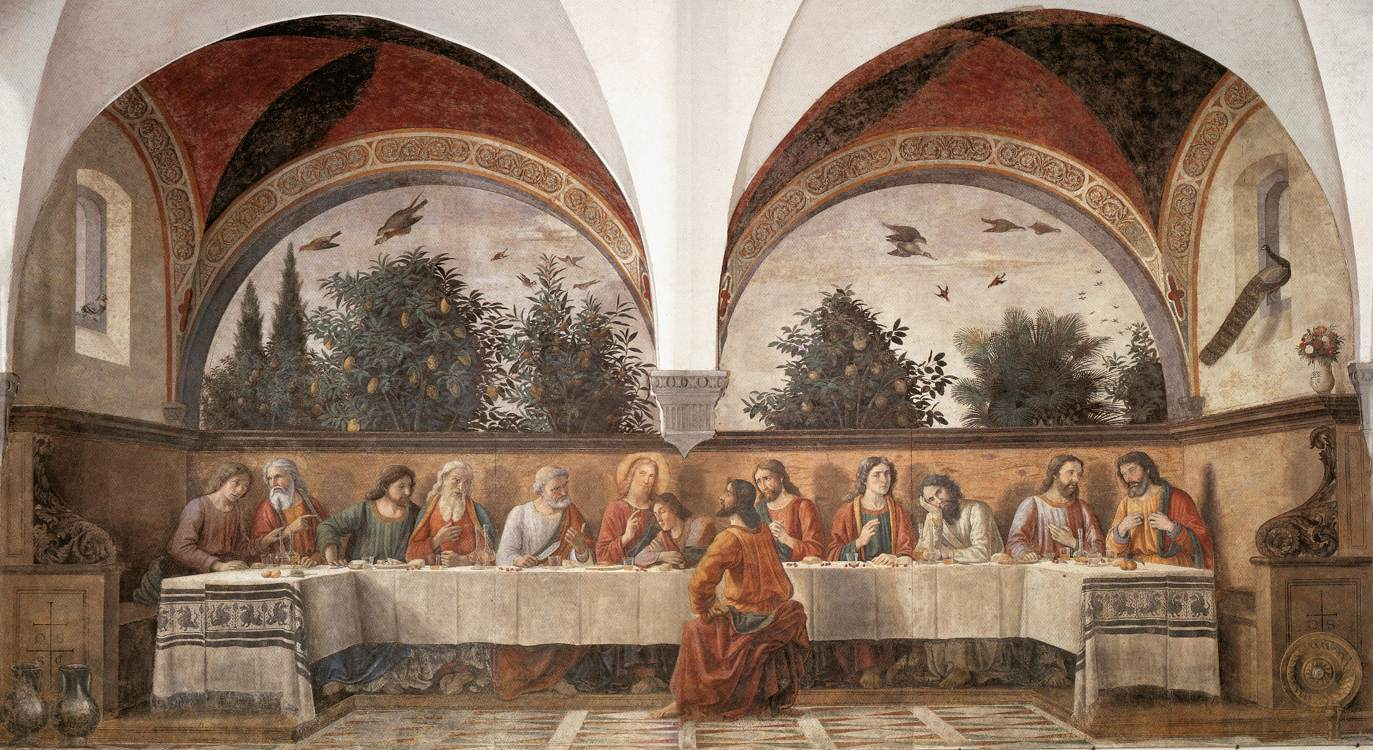
Domenico Ghirlandaio, 1480, depicting Judas separately

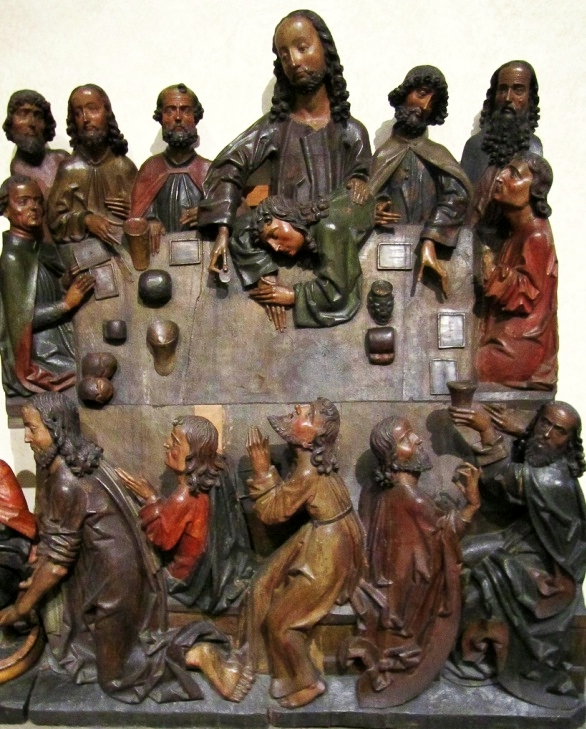
Last Supper, sculpture, c. 1500

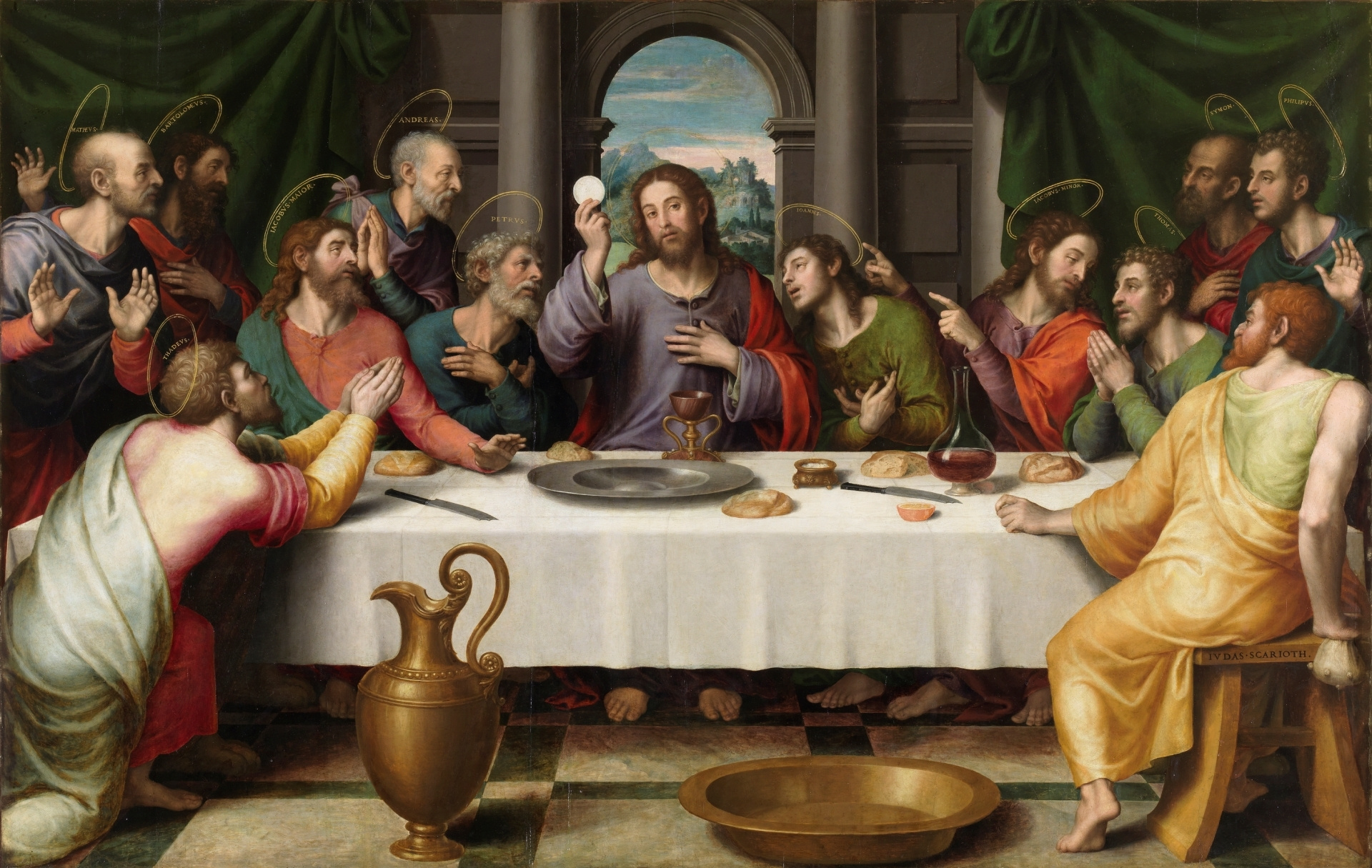
The first Eucharist, depicted by Juan de Juanes in The Last Supper, c. 1562

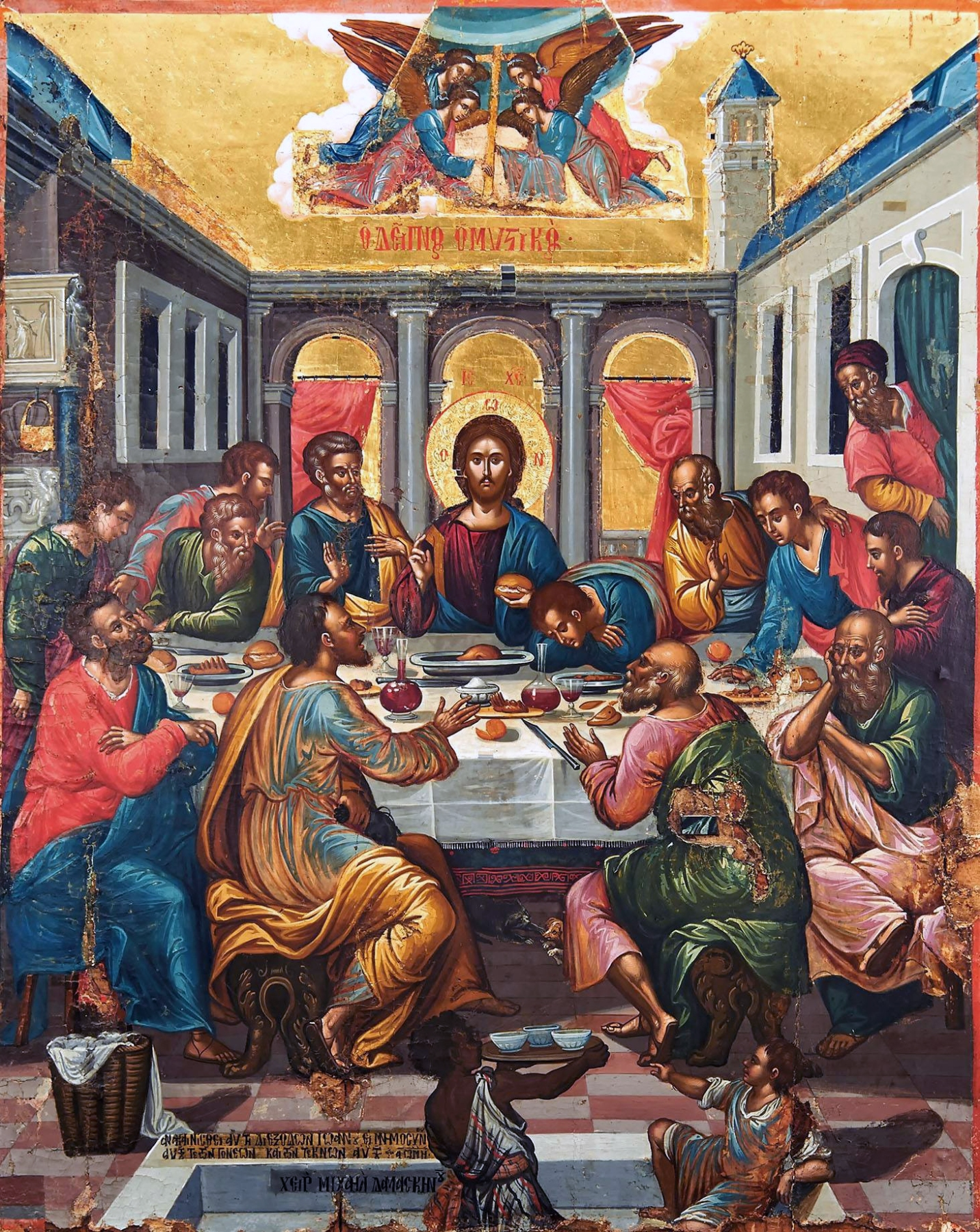
The Last Supper, by Michael Damaskinos, c. 1591

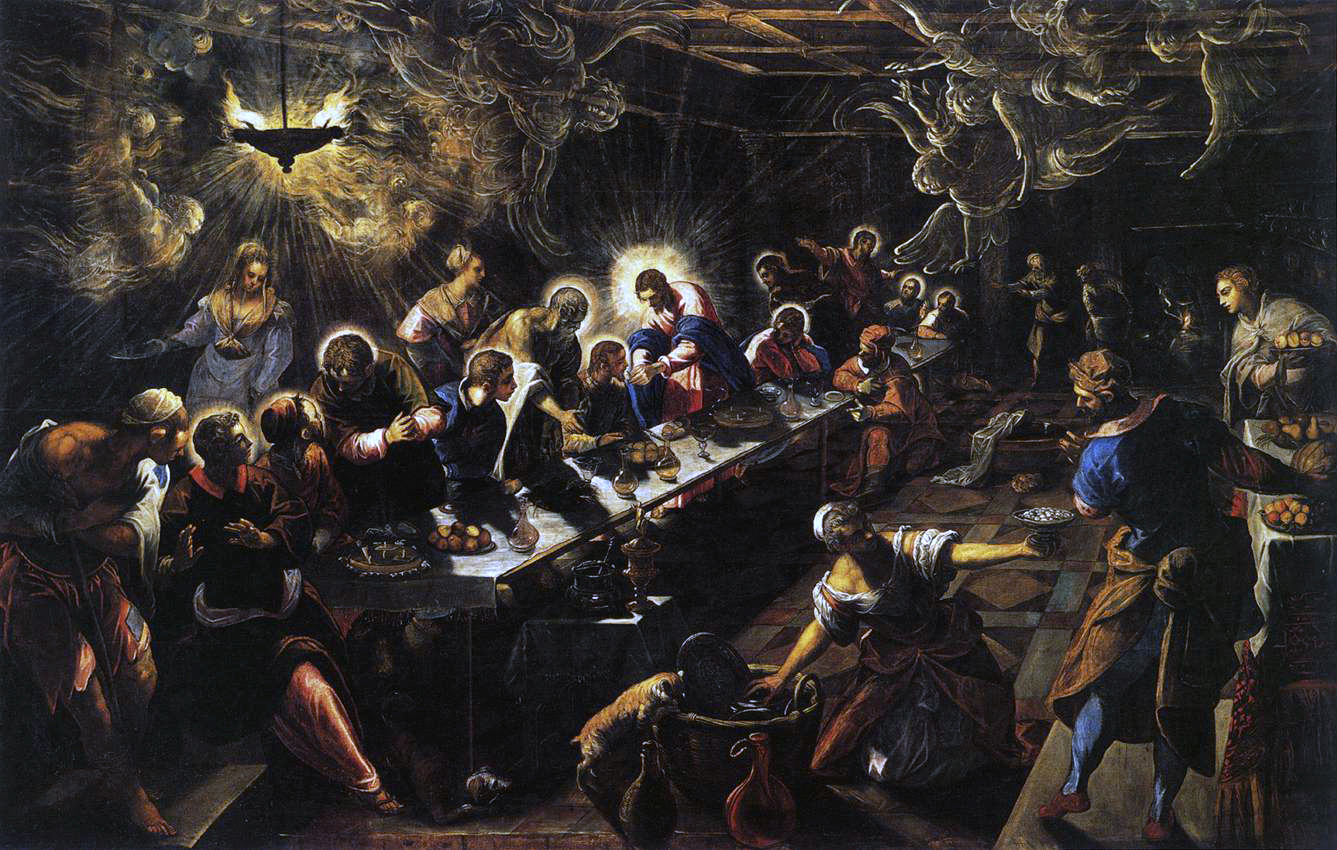
The Last Supper, by Tintoretto, 1592–1594

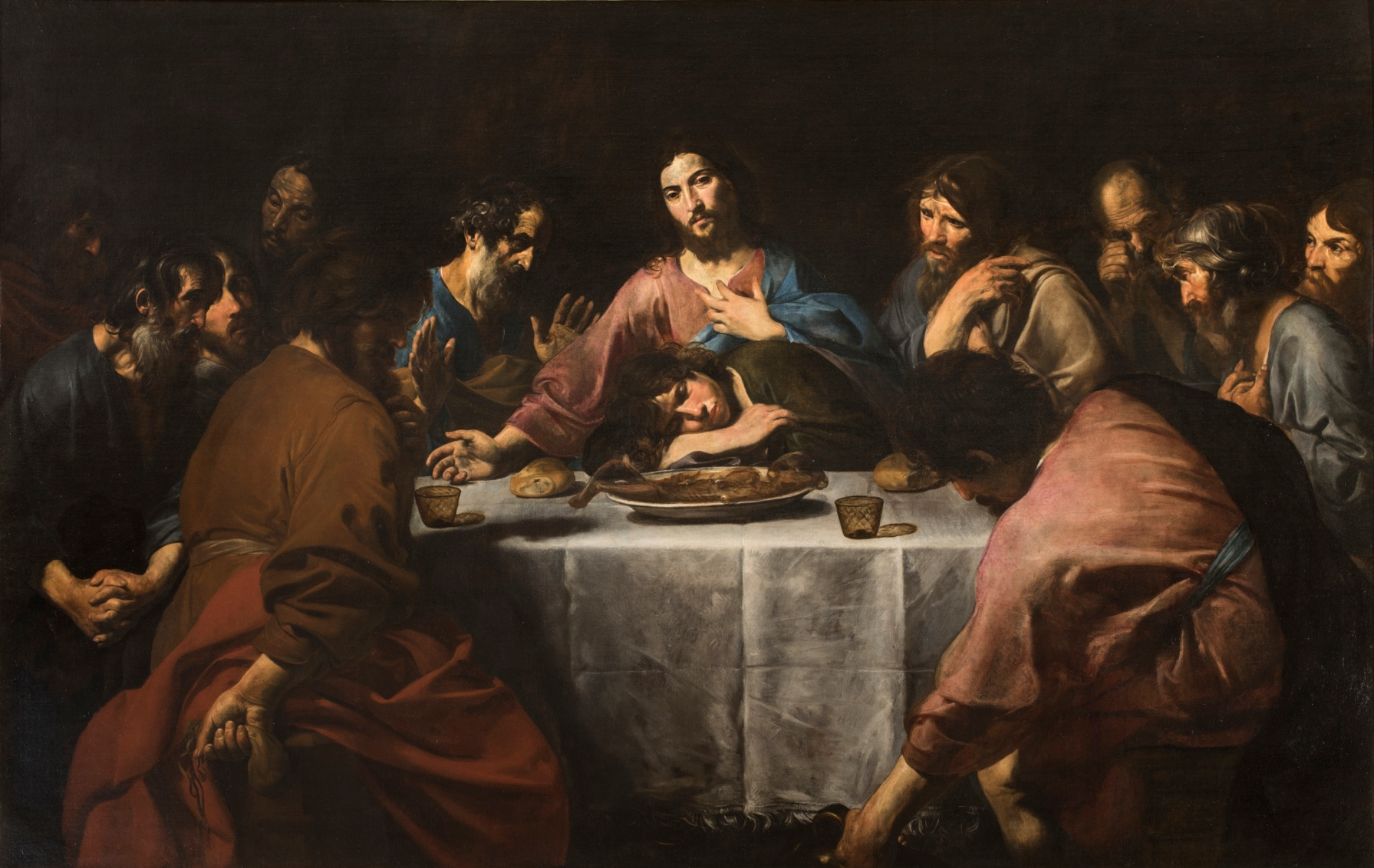
Valentin de Boulogne, 1625–1626

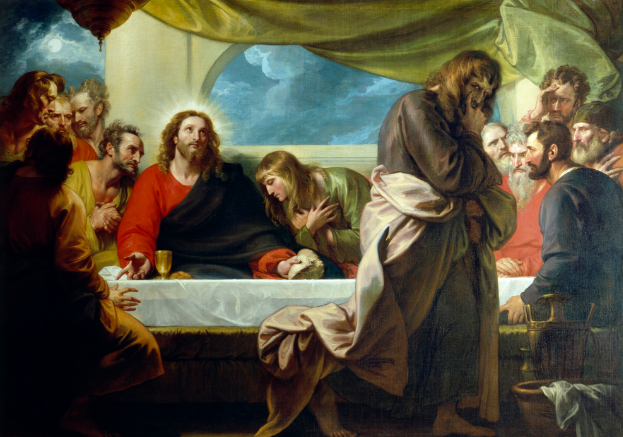
The Last Supper (Dark side of the Eucharist), by Benjamin West, mid 18 century

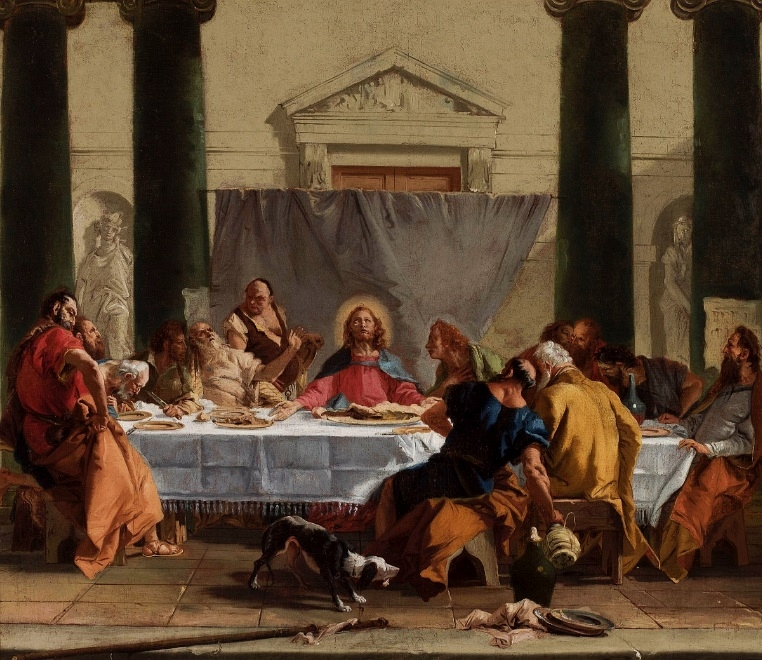
Last Supper by Tiepolo, c. 1760

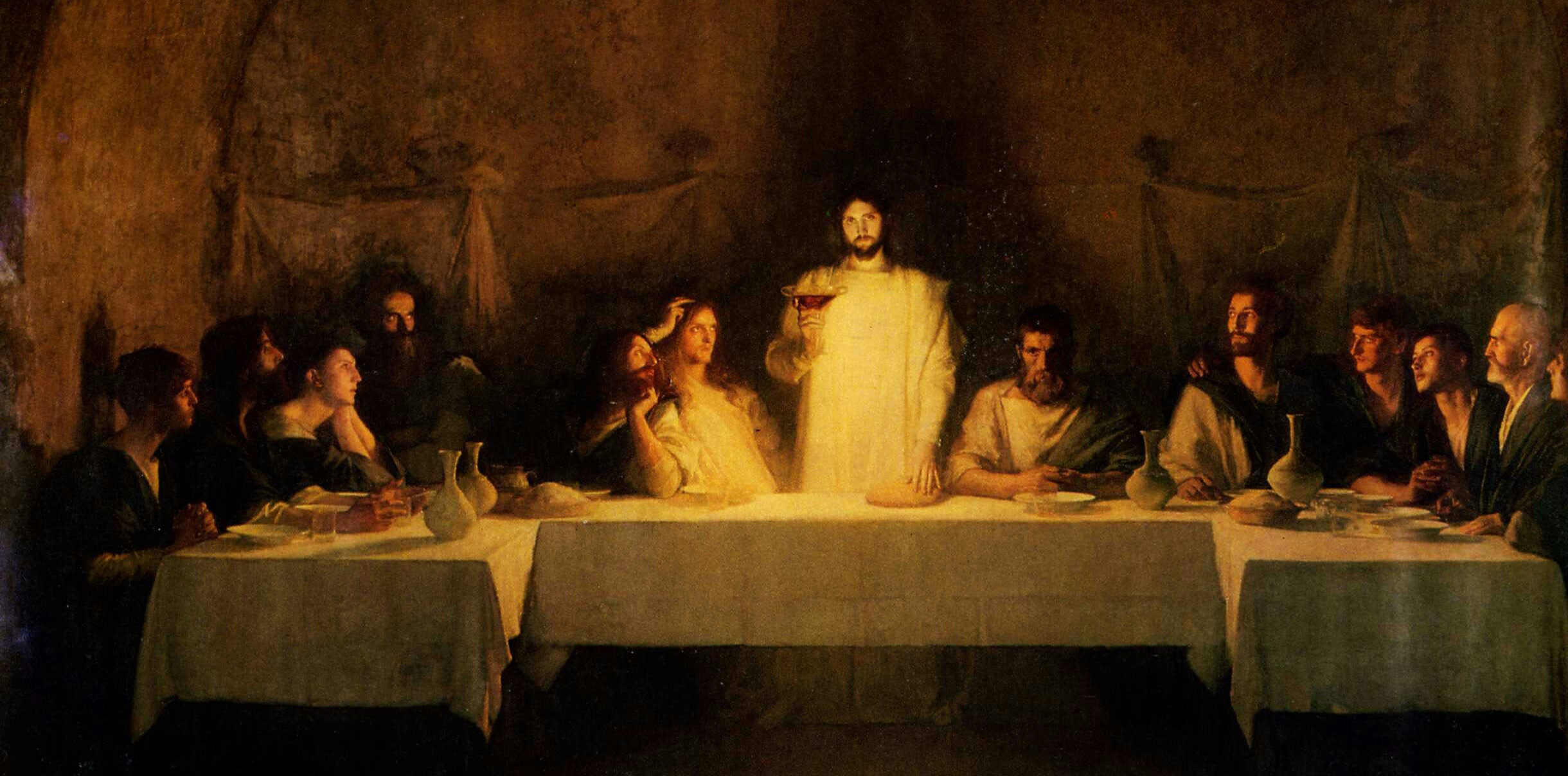
The Last Supper, by Bouveret, 19th century

The Last Supper by Lazzaro Pisani, 1917, the altarpiece of Corpus Christi Parish Church in Għasri, Malta

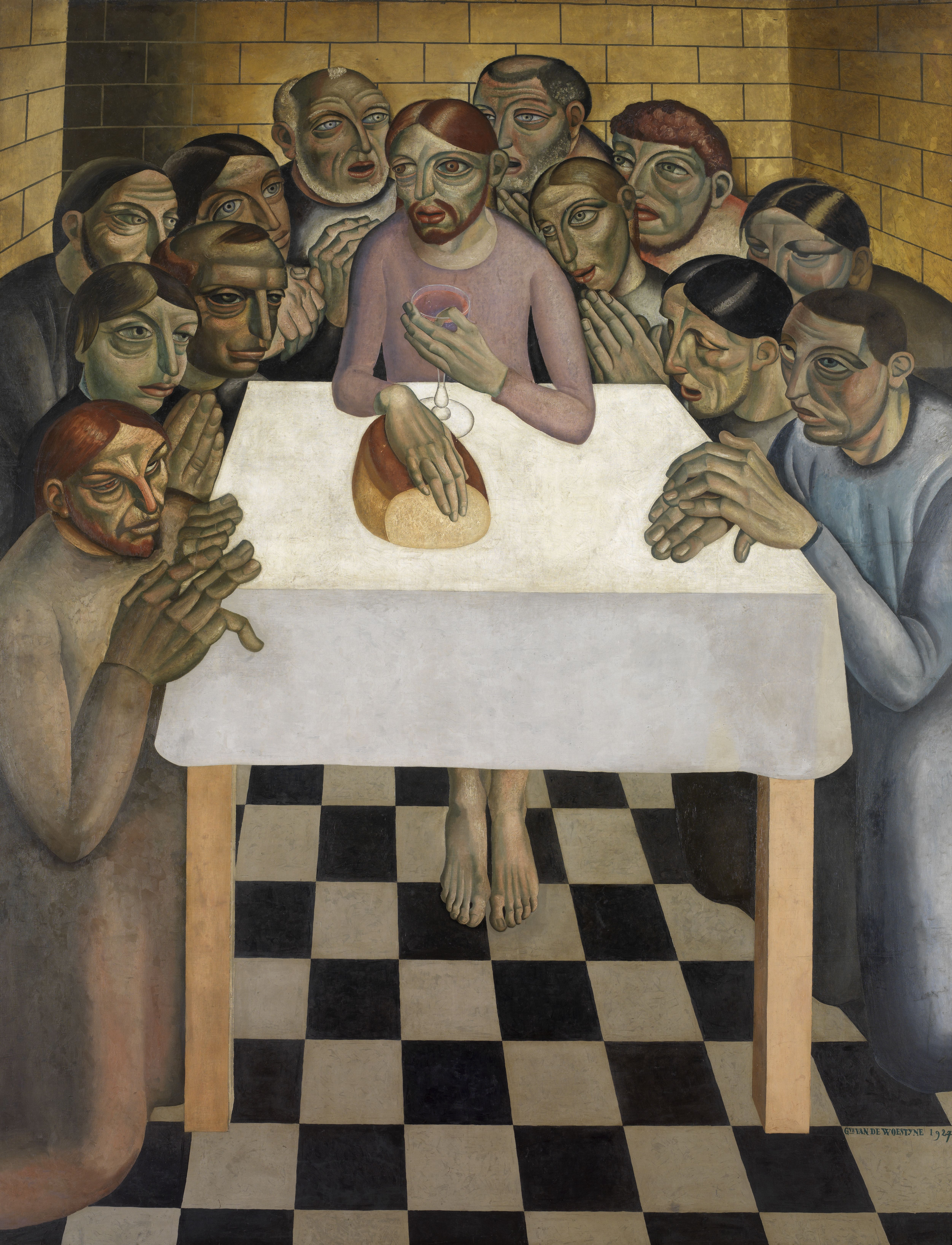
Last Supper, by Gustave Van de Woestijne, 1927

== See also ==
- Book of the Secret Supper
- Friday the 13th
- Life of Jesus in the New Testament
- List of dining events
