= Christology =

Theological study of Jesus Christ

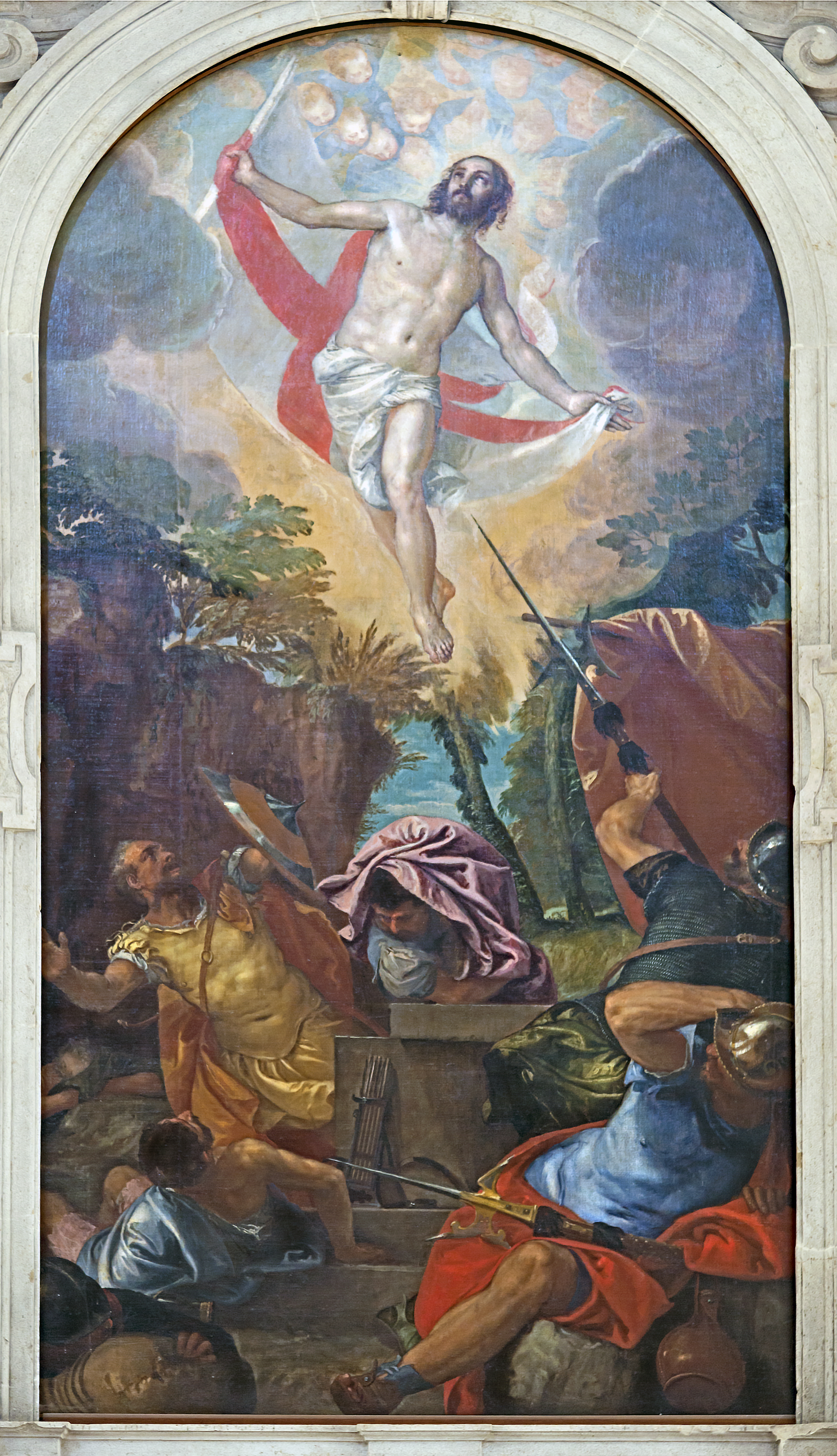
Paolo Veronese, The Resurrection of Jesus Christ (c. 1560)

Christology is a branch of Christian theology that concerns the nature of Jesus, which has been the topic of much debate over the centuries that culminated in the ecumenical Council of Chalcedon in 451 AD, issuing a formulation of the hypostatic union between a human and divine nature of Jesus, "united with neither confusion nor division."

Different denominations have different, sometimes mutually exclusive, beliefs on this matter, such as whether Jesus was divine in nature, human in nature, both, or neither. Jesus's mission as the Jewish messiah is also a related concern: whether he came specifically to free the Jewish people from foreign rulers, something else in addition to that, or something else entirely, and what his role is in salvation and the coming of the kingdom of heaven.

Christian writings address Jesus by numerous titles, such as Son of Man, Son of God, Christ (Messiah), and Kyrios. These terms centered around certain themes, namely "Jesus as a preexistent figure who becomes human and then returns to God" as opposed to adoptionism, the notion that Jesus was a human who was adopted by God at some point, typically when he is baptised, crucified, or resurrected.

Contemporary scholarship generally acknowledges the advent of high Christology as a monotheistic phenomenon within early Jewish Christianity, though older evolutionary models viewed it as a later gentile concept. Most scholars argue that high Christology precedes Paul. Many scholars today contend that the synoptic gospels and other New Testament texts portray Jesus as divine both in a general sense and as potentially as a manifestation of the God of Israel.

== Definition and approaches ==
Christology (from the Greek χριστός, khristós, 'anointed one' and -λογία, -logia), literally 'the understanding of Christ', is the study of the nature (person) and work (role in salvation) (Note: The work of Jesus Christ: Veli-Matti Kärkkäinen: "soteriology, the doctrine of salvation"; biblicaltraining.org: "The Past Work of Christ, The Atoning Savior"; "Present work of Christ: work as mediator and Lord"; "Future work of Christ: work as coming judge and reigning king") of Jesus Christ. (Note: Definitions: Bart Ehrman: "the understanding of Christ"; "the nature of Christ – the question of Christology"; Bird, Evans & Gathercole (2014): "New Testament scholars often speak about "Christology", which is the study of the career, person, nature, and identity of Jesus Christ."; Raymond Brown (1994): "[C]hristology discusses any evaluation of Jesus in respect to who he was and the role he played in the divine plan."; Bernard L. Ramm (1993): "Christology is the reflective and systematic study of the person and work of Jesus Christ."; Matt Stefon, Hans J. Hillerbrand (Encyclopedia Britannica): "Christology, Christian reflection, teaching, and doctrine concerning Jesus of Nazareth. Christology is the part of theology that is concerned with the nature and work of Jesus, including such matters as the Incarnation, the Resurrection, and his human and divine natures and their relationship."; Catholic Encyclopedia: "Christology is that part of theology which deals with Our Lord Jesus Christ. In its full extent it comprises the doctrines concerning both the person of Christ and His works.") It studies Jesus Christ's humanity and divinity, and the relationship between these two aspects; as well as the role he plays in salvation.

Ontological Christology analyzes the nature or being of Jesus Christ. Functional Christology analyzes the works of Jesus Christ, while soteriological Christology analyzes the "salvific" standpoints of Christology.

Theologians may take several different approaches to Christology. (Note: Bird, Evans & Gathercole (2014): "There are, of course, many different ways of doing Christology. Some scholars study Christology by focusing on the major titles applied to Jesus in the New Testament, such as "Son of Man", "Son of God", "Messiah", "Lord", "Prince", "Word", and the like. Others take a more functional approach and look at how Jesus acts or is said to act in the New Testament as the basis for configuring beliefs about him. It is possible to explore Jesus as a historical figure (i.e., Christology from below), or to examine theological claims made about Jesus (i.e., Christology from above). Many scholars prefer a socio-religious method, comparing beliefs about Jesus with beliefs in other religions to identify shared sources and similar ideas. Theologians often take a more philosophical approach and look at Jesus' "ontology" or "being" and debate how best to describe his divine and human natures.") For example:

- Christology from above or high Christology emphasizes approaches that include aspects of divinity (such as titles like "Lord" and "Son of God") and the idea of the pre-existence of Christ as the Logos ('the Word'), (as expressed in the prologue to the Gospel of John. (Note: John 1:1–14)) These approaches interpret the works of Christ in terms of his divinity. According to Pannenberg, Christology from above "was far more common in the ancient Church, beginning with Ignatius of Antioch and the second century Apologists".
- Christology from below or low Christology takes as its starting point the human aspects and the ministry of Jesus (including the miracles, parables, etc.) and moves towards his divinity and the mystery of incarnation.

=== Person of Christ ===
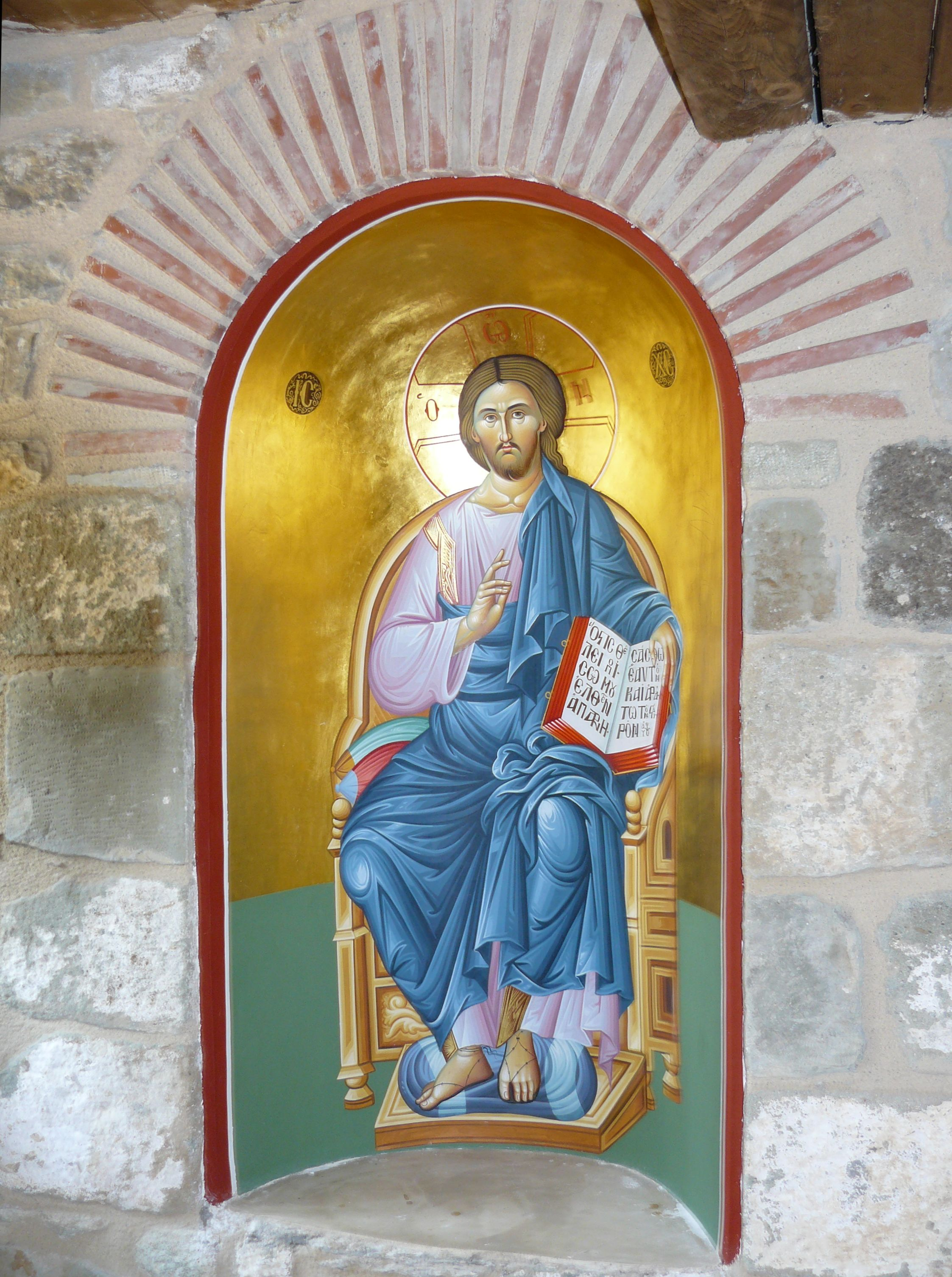
Christ Pantocrator, Holy Trinity's monastery, Meteora, Greece

A standard Christological teaching describes Jesus as possessing two natures: one human, one divine. Many scholars today concede this. The convictions of Jesus of himself mark the point of origins of Christological views. Some issues have arisen regarding the exact kind of union these two are in. According to post-Chalcedonian definitions, Jesus's two natures form a duality, coexisting within one hypostatic union. However, in the Oriental Orthodox paradigm, the union of these two natures is a composite nature that is both fully human and fully divine. There are no direct discussions in the New Testament regarding a dual nature of Jesus; theologians have debated various approaches since the early days of Christianity.

From the earliest sources, Paul's letters, Jesus is already considered God's "Son", the "Lord", pre-existent, and linked to the Father. Jesus is understood to receive prayer (1 Corinthians 1:2; 2 Corinthians 12:8–9), the presence of Jesus is confessionally invoked by believers (1 Corinthians 16:22; Romans 10:9–13; Philippians 2:10–11), people are baptized in Jesus' name (1 Corinthians 6:11; Romans 6:3), Jesus is the reference in Christian fellowship for a religious ritual meal (the Lord's Supper; 1 Corinthians 11:17–34). Jesus is described as "existing in the very form of God" (Philippians 2:6), and being the "fullness of the Deity [living] in bodily form" (Colossians 2:9). Jesus is also in some verses directly called God (Romans 9:5, Titus 2:13, 2 Peter 1:1).

The standard evidences for the divinity of Jesus fall under five themes that are shared by God: his honors, attributes, names, deeds, and shares the seat of God's throne.

There are some Christological doctrines that have acquired broad support:

- Monophysitism (Monophysite controversy, 3rd–8th centuries): After the union of the divine and the human in the historical incarnation, Jesus Christ had only a single nature. The Council of Chalcedon and Third Council of Ephesus condemned Monophysitism as heretical in 451 AD and 475 AD, respectively.
- Miaphysitism (Oriental Orthodox churches): In the person of Jesus Christ, divine nature and human nature are united in a compound nature ('physis').
- Dyophysitism (Eastern Orthodox Church, Catholic Church, Church of the East, Lutheranism, Anglicanism, and the Reformed Churches): Christ maintained two natures, one divine and one human, after the Incarnation; articulated by the Chalcedonian Definition.
- Monarchianism (including Adoptionism and Modalism): God as one, in contrast to the doctrine of the Trinity. Condemned as heretical in the Patristic era but followed today by certain groups of Nontrinitarians.

Influential Christologies broadly condemned as heretical (Note: Heretical Christologies: Docetism (3rd–4th centuries) taught that the phenomenon of Jesus, his historical and bodily existence, and above all the human form of Jesus, was mere semblance without any true reality. Broadly it is taken as the belief that Jesus only seemed to be human, and that his human form was an illusion. Docetic teachings were attacked by Ignatius of Antioch and were eventually abandoned by proto-orthodox Christians.; Arianism, which viewed Jesus as primarily an ordinary mortal, was condemned as heretical in 325, exonerated in 335, and eventually re-condemned as heretical at the First Council of Constantinople (381).; Nestorianism opposed the concept of hypostatic union, and emphasized a radical distinction between the two natures (human and divine) of Jesus Christ. It was condemned by the Council of Ephesus (431).; Monothelitism held that although Christ has two natures (Dyophysitism), his will is united. The doctrine was promoted by Emperor Heraclius and Ecumenical Patriarch Sergius I as a compromise position between Chalcedonianism and various minority christologies. It was condemned as heretical by the Third Council of Constantinople (681).) include:

- Docetism (3rd–4th centuries) claimed the human form of Jesus was mere semblance without any true reality.
- Arianism (4th century) viewed the divine nature of Jesus, the Son of God, as distinct and inferior to God the Father, e.g., by having a beginning in time.
- Nestorianism (5th century) considers the two natures (human and divine) of Jesus Christ to subsist separately.
- Monothelitism (7th century), considered Christ to have only one will.

As councils were convened, some theological positions were rejected as heresies, yet the acceptance of these councils remains partial. Notably, certain Christological views reemerged in later centuries, such as the beliefs of Jehovah's Witnesses, which reflect elements of Arianism.

=== Salvation ===
In Christian theology, atonement is the forgiving of sin and the method by which human beings can be reconciled to God, both through faith in Jesus's crucifixion and resurrection. Due to the influence of Gustaf Aulén (1879–1978), whose book Christus Victor came out in English translation in 1931, the various theories or paradigmata of atonement are often grouped under the headings of the "classical paradigm," "objective paradigm," and "subjective paradigm."

- Classical paradigm: (Note: The "ransom theory" and the "Christ Victor" theory are different, but are generally considered together as Patristic or "classical" theories, to use Gustaf Aulén's nomenclature. These were the traditional understandings of the early Church Fathers.)
  - Ransom theory of atonement, which teaches that Jesus's death was a ransom sacrifice, usually said to have been paid to Satan or to death itself, in some views paid to God the Father, in satisfaction for the bondage and debt on the souls of humanity as a result of inherited sin. Gustaf Aulén reinterpreted the ransom theory, calling it the Christus Victor doctrine, arguing that Christ's death was not a payment to the Devil, but defeated the powers of evil, which had held humankind in their dominion. (Note: According to Pugh, "Ever since [Aulén's] time, we call these patristic ideas the Christus Victor way of seeing the cross.")
  - Recapitulation theory, which says that Jesus succeeded where Adam failed. Theosis ('divinization') is a "corollary" of the recapitulation.
- Objective paradigm:
  - Satisfaction theory of atonement, (Note: Called by Aulén the "scholastic" view) developed by Anselm of Canterbury (1033/4–1109), which teaches that Jesus Christ suffered crucifixion as a substitute for human sin, satisfying God's just wrath against humankind's transgression due to Christ's infinite merit.
  - Penal substitution, also called "forensic theory" and "vicarious punishment," which was a development by the Reformers of Anselm's satisfaction theory. (Note: Penal substitution: Vincent Taylor (1956): "the four main types, which have persisted throughout the centuries. The oldest theory is the Ransom Theory [...] It held sway for a thousand years [...] The Forensic Theory is that of the Reformers and their successors."; Packer (1973): "Luther, Calvin, Zwingli, Melanchthon and their reforming contemporaries were the pioneers in stating it [i.e. the penal substitutionary theory] [...] What the Reformers did was to redefine satisfactio (satisfaction), the main mediaeval category for thought about the cross. Anselm's Cur Deus Homo?, which largely determined the mediaeval development, saw Christ's satisfactio for our sins as the offering of compensation or damages for dishonour done, but the Reformers saw it as the undergoing of vicarious punishment (poena) to meet the claims on us of God's holy law and wrath (i.e. his punitive justice).") (Note: Mark D. Baker, objecting against the penal substitution theory, states that "substitution is a broad term that one can use with reference to a variety of metaphors.") Instead of considering sin as an affront to God's honour, it sees sin as the breaking of God's moral law. Penal substitution sees sinful man as being subject to God's wrath, with the essence of Jesus' saving work being his substitution in the sinner's place, bearing the curse in the place of man.
  - Governmental theory of atonement, "which views God as both the loving creator and moral Governor of the universe."
- Subjective paradigm:
  - Moral influence theory of atonement, (Note: Which Aulén called the "subjective" or "humanistic" view. Propagated, as a critique of the satisfaction view, by Peter Abelard) developed, or most notably propagated, by Abelard (1079–1142), who argued that "Jesus died as the demonstration of God's love," a demonstration which can change the hearts and minds of the sinners, turning back to God.
  - Moral example theory, developed by Faustus Socinus (1539–1604) in his work De Jesu Christo servatore (1578), who rejected the idea of "vicarious satisfaction." (Note: Christ suffering for, or punished for, the sinners.) According to Socinus, Jesus' death offers humanity a perfect example of self-sacrificial dedication to God.

Other theories are the "embracement theory" and the "shared atonement" theory.

== Early Christologies (1st century) ==
The earliest Christological reflections were shaped by both the Jewish background of the earliest Christians, and by the Greek world of the eastern Mediterranean in which they operated. (Note: Early Christians found themselves confronted with a set of new concepts and ideas relating to the life, death, and resurrection of Jesus, as well the notions of salvation and redemption, and had to use a new set of terms, images, and ideas in order to deal with them. The existing terms and structures which were available to them were often insufficient to express these religious concepts, and taken together, these new forms of discourse led to the beginnings of Christology as an attempt to understand, explain, and discuss their understanding of the nature of Christ. Early Jewish Christians had to explain their concepts to a Hellenistic audience which had been influenced by Greek philosophy, presenting arguments that at times resonated with, and at times confronted, the beliefs of that audience. This is exemplified by the Apostle Paul's Areopagus sermon that appears in Acts 17:16–34, where Paul is portrayed as attempting to convey the underlying concepts about Christ to a Greek audience. The sermon illustrates some key elements of future christological discourses that were first brought forward by Paul.)

According to Matthew Novenson:

... whereas for much of the twentieth century high Christology was widely thought to be late, Gentile, and polytheist, over the last thirty years it has taken its place as early, Jewish, and monotheist.

Historically, in the Alexandrian school of thought (fashioned on the Gospel of John), Jesus is the eternal Logos who already possesses unity with the Father before the act of Incarnation. In contrast, the Antiochian school viewed Christ as a single, unified human person apart from his relationship to the divine. (Note: The views of these schools can be summarized as follows: Alexandria: Logos assumes a general human nature; Antioch: Logos assumes a specific human being.)

=== Development of Christology ===
Two fundamentally different Christologies developed in the early Church, namely a "low" or adoptionist Christology, and a "high" or "incarnation" Christology. The chronology of the development of these early Christologies is a matter of debate within contemporary scholarship. There is no consensus on the continuity or discontinuity of earthly Jesus and post-Easter christology.

The "low Christology" or "adoptionist Christology" is the belief "that God exalted Jesus to be his Son by raising him from the dead", thereby raising him to "divine status". According to the "evolutionary model" or evolutionary theories, the Christological understanding of Jesus developed over time, as witnessed in the Gospels, with the earliest Christians believing that Jesus was a human who was exalted, or else adopted as God's Son, when he was resurrected. Later beliefs shifted the exaltation to his baptism, to his birth, and subsequently to the idea of his pre-existence, as witnessed in the Gospel of John. This "evolutionary model" was proposed by proponents of the Religionsgeschichtliche Schule, especially Wilhelm Bousset's influential Kyrios Christos (1913). This evolutionary model was very influential, and the "low Christology" has long been regarded as the oldest Christology. (Note: Ehrman: "The earliest Christians held exaltation Christologies in which the human being Jesus was made the Son of God – for example, at his resurrection or at his baptism – as we examined in the previous chapter."; "Here I'll say something about the oldest Christology, as I understand it. This was what I earlier called a 'low' Christology. I may end up in the book describing it as a 'Christology from below' or possibly an 'exaltation' Christology. Or maybe I'll call it all three things [...] Along with lots of other scholars, I think this was indeed the earliest Christology.")

The other early Christology is "high Christology", which is "the view that Jesus was a pre-existent divine being who became a human, did the Father's will on earth, and then was taken back up into heaven whence he had originally come", and from where he appeared on earth. (Note: Proponents of Christ's deity argue the Old Testament has many cases of Christophany: "The pre-existence of Christ is further substantiated by the many recorded Christophanies in the Bible." "Christophany" is often considered a more accurate term than the term "theophany" due to the belief that all the visible manifestations of God are in fact the preincarnate Christ. Many argue that the appearances of "the Angel of the Lord" in the Old Testament were the preincarnate Christ. "Many understand the angel of the Lord as a true theophany. From the time of Justin on, the figure has been regarded as the preincarnate Logos.") According to Bousset, this "high Christology" developed at the time of Paul's writing, under the influence of Gentile Christians, who brought their pagan Hellenistic traditions to the early Christian communities, introducing divine honours to Jesus. According to Casey and Dunn, this "high Christology" developed after the time of Paul, at the end of the first century CE when the Gospel of John was written.

Since the 1970s, these late datings for the development of a "high Christology" have been contested, and a majority of scholars argue that this "high Christology" existed already before the writings of Paul. (Note: Richard Bauckham argues that Paul was not so influential that he could have invented the central doctrine of Christianity. Before his active missionary work, there were already groups of Christians across the region. For example, a large group already existed in Rome even before Paul visited the place. The earliest centre of Christianity was the twelve apostles in Jerusalem. Paul himself consulted and sought guidance from the Christian leaders in Jerusalem (Galatians 2:1–2; Acts 9:26–28, 15:2). "What was common to the whole Christian movement derived from Jerusalem, not from Paul, and Paul himself derived the central message he preached from the Jerusalem apostles.") According to the "New Religionsgeschichtliche Schule", or the Early High Christology Club, which includes Martin Hengel, Larry Hurtado, N. T. Wright, and Richard Bauckham, this "incarnation Christology" or "high Christology" did not evolve over a longer time, but was a "big bang" of ideas which were already present at the start of Christianity, and took further shape in the first few decades of the church, as witnessed in the writings of Paul. (Note: Loke (2017): "The last group of theories can be called 'Explosion Theories' (one might also call this 'the Big-Bang theory of Christology'!). This proposes that highest Christology was the view of the primitive Palestinian Christian community. The recognition of Jesus as truly divine was not a significant development from the views of the primitive Palestine community; rather, it 'exploded' right at the beginning of Christianity. The proponents of the Explosion view would say that the highest Christology of the later New Testament writings (e.g. Gospel of John) and the creedal formulations of the early church fathers, with their explicit affirmations of the pre-existence and ontological divinity of Christ, are not so much a development in essence but a development in understanding and explication of what was already there at the beginning of the Christian movement. As Bauckham (2008a, x) memorably puts it, 'The earliest Christology was already the highest Christology.' Many proponents of this group of theories have been labelled together as 'the New Religionsgeschichtliche Schule' (Hurtado 2003, 11), and they include such eminent scholars as Richard Bauckham, Larry Hurtado, N. T. Wright and the late Martin Hengel.") (Note: Andrew Loke has argued that this "high Christology" may go back to Jesus himself. Loke argues that if Jesus did not claim and show himself to be truly divine and risen from the dead, the earliest Christian leaders who were devout ancient monotheistic Jews would have regarded Jesus as merely a teacher or a prophet; they would not have come to the widespread agreement that he was truly divine, which they did; on which Larry Hurtado commented "I don't find Loke's case persuasive." Brant Pitre also argues that the Historical Jesus claimed to be divine and was the origin of high Christology.)

New Testament scholar Larry Hurtado supports this early high Christology position, emphasizing that devotional practices directed toward Jesus, such as prayer, hymns, invocation of his name, and the Aramaic liturgical expression Maranatha emerged remarkably early, likely within the first months or years following Jesus’ crucifixion. Hurtado argues that this reverence arose initially within Jewish-Christian communities in Roman Judea and involved assigning to Jesus divine prerogatives previously reserved for God alone, such as participation in worship and the divine throne. He views this as a historically unprecedented development in Jewish monotheistic devotion.

There is a controversy regarding whether Jesus himself claimed to be divine. In Honest to God (1963), then-Bishop of Woolwich, John A. T. Robinson, questioned the idea. John Hick, writing in 1993, and separately Gerd Ludemann, cited "broad agreement" that scholars do not today support the view that Jesus claimed to be God and that the proclamation of the divinity of Jesus was a development within the earliest Christian communities. Larry Hurtado, who argues that the followers of Jesus within a very short period developed an exceedingly high level of devotional reverence to Jesus. N. T. Wright points out that arguments over the claims of Jesus regarding divinity have been passed over by more recent scholarship, which sees a more complex understanding of the idea of God in first century Judaism. Andrew Loke has argued that this "high Christology" may go back to Jesus himself. Loke argues that if Jesus did not claim and show himself to be truly divine and risen from the dead, the earliest Christian leaders who were devout ancient monotheistic Jews would have regarded Jesus as merely a teacher or a prophet; they would not have come to the widespread agreement that he was truly divine, which they did; on which Larry Hurtado commented "I don't find Loke's case persuasive." Brant Pitre also argues that the Historical Jesus claimed to be divine and was the origin of high Christology. According to Dale Allison, writing for The New Cambridge Companion to Jesus, the historical Jesus held an exalted self-conception comparable to divine agents in other Second Temple Jewish texts, such as the Son of man.

=== New Testament writings ===
The study of the various Christologies of the Apostolic Age is based on early Christian documents.

==== Paul ====
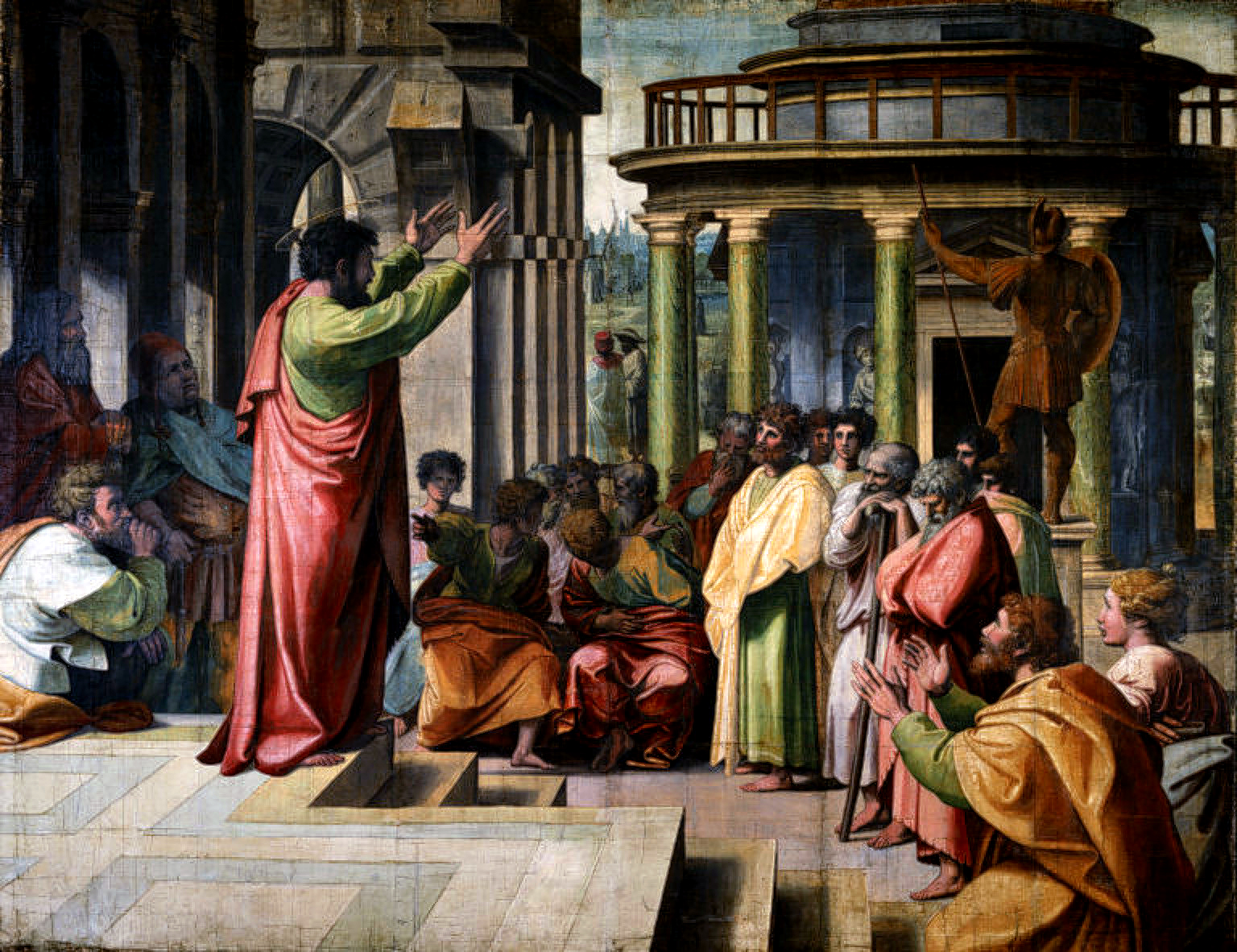
Saint Paul delivering the Areopagus sermon in Athens, by Raphael, 1515

The oldest Christian sources are the writings of Paul. According to most scholars, the central Christology of Paul conveys the notion of Christ's pre-existence. This is disputed by a minority of scholars. and the identification of Christ as Kyrios. Both notions likely existed before him in the early Christian communities, and Paul deepened them and used them for preaching in the Hellenistic communities.

What exactly Paul believed about the nature of Jesus cannot be determined decisively. In Philippians 2, Paul possibly implies that Jesus was preexistent and came to Earth "by taking the form of a servant, being made in human likeness". This sounds like an incarnation Christology according to the view of most scholars. Although this interpretation has been disputed by a few scholars. In Romans 1:4, however, Paul states that Jesus "was declared with power to be the Son of God by his resurrection from the dead", which sounds like an adoptionistic Christology, where Jesus was a human being who was "adopted" after his death. Different views would be debated for centuries by Christians and finally settled on the idea that he was both fully human and fully divine by the middle of the 5th century in the Council of Ephesus. Paul's thoughts on Jesus' teachings, versus his nature and being, are more defined, in that Paul believed Jesus was sent as an atonement for the sins of everyone.

The Pauline epistles use Kyrios to identify Jesus almost 230 times, and express the theme that the true mark of a Christian is the confession of Jesus as the true Lord. Paul viewed the superiority of the Christian revelation over all other divine manifestations as a consequence of the fact that Christ is the Son of God.

The Pauline epistles also advanced the "cosmic Christology" (Note: The concept of "cosmic Christology", which focuses on how the arrival of Jesus as the Son of God forever changed the nature of the cosmos.) later developed in the Gospel of John, elaborating the cosmic implications of Jesus' existence as the Son of God: "Therefore, if anyone is in Christ, he is a new creation. The old has passed away; behold, the new has come." In the Epistle to the Colossians, which purports to be written by Paul (though this is disputed), relevant claims are made: "Through him God was pleased to reconcile to himself all things, whether on earth or in heaven"; "He is the image of the invisible God, the firstborn of all creation".

==== The Gospels ====
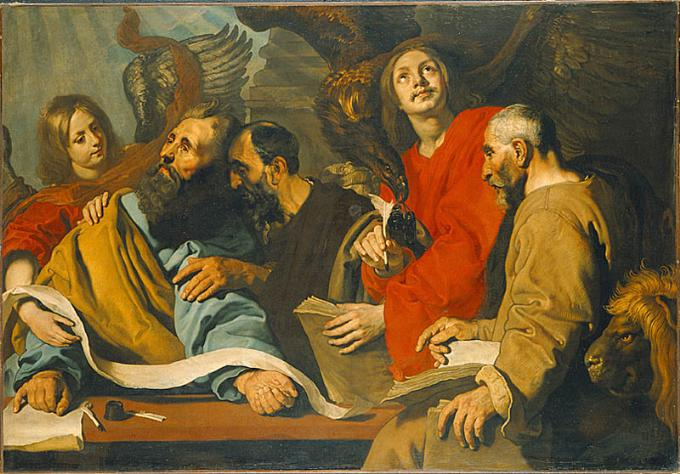
The Four Evangelists, by Pieter Soutman, 17th century

The synoptic Gospels date from after the writings of Paul. They provide episodes from the life of Jesus and some of his works, but the authors of the New Testament show little interest in an absolute chronology of Jesus or in synchronizing the episodes of his life, and as in John 21:25, the Gospels do not claim to be an exhaustive list of his works.

Many scholars today concede the synoptic gospels and other New Testament texts portray Jesus as divine both in a general sense and as potentially as a manifestation of the God of Israel. Christologies that can be gleaned from the three synoptic Gospels generally emphasize the humanity of Jesus, his sayings, his parables, and his miracles. The Gospel of John provides a different perspective that focuses on his divinity. The first 14 verses of the Gospel of John are devoted to the divinity of Jesus as the Logos, usually translated as "Word", along with his pre-existence, and they emphasize the cosmic significance of Christ, e.g.: "All things were made through him, and without him was not any thing made that was made." The prologue identifies Jesus as the Logos (Word) and identifies the Word as "God", and in the gospel while not being God the Father, Jesus is like the Father and claims the same powers and abilities as God. In the context of these verses, the Word made flesh is identical with the Word who was in the beginning with God, being exegetically equated with Jesus.

==== Pre-existence ====
The notion of pre-existence is deeply rooted in Jewish thought, and can be found in apocalyptic thought and among the rabbis of Paul's time, but Paul was most influenced by Jewish-Hellenistic wisdom literature, where "'Wisdom' is extolled as something existing before the world and already working in creation. According to Witherington, Paul "subscribed to the christological notion that Christ existed prior to taking on human flesh[,] founding the story of Christ [...] on the story of divine Wisdom". (Note: Witherington: "[Christ's Divinity] We have already seen that Paul, in appropriating the language of the christological hymns, subscribed to the christological notion that Christ existed prior to taking on human flesh. Paul spoke of Jesus both as the wisdom of God, his agent in creation (1 Cor 1:24, 30; 8:6; Col 1:15–17; see Bruce, 195), and as the one who accompanied Israel as the 'rock' in the wilderness (1 Cor 10:4). In view of the role Christ plays in 1 Corinthians 10:4, Paul is not founding the story of Christ on the archetypal story of Israel, but rather on the story of divine Wisdom, which helped Israel in the wilderness.")

==== Kyrios ====
The title Kyrios for Jesus is central to the development of New Testament Christology. In the Septuagint it translates the Tetragrammaton, the name of the God of Moses. As such, it closely links Jesus with God, as in, "... in the name (singular) of the Father and of the Son and of the Holy Spirit ...".

Kyrios is also conjectured to be the Greek translation of Aramaic Mari, which in everyday Aramaic usage was a very respectful form of polite address, which means more than just 'teacher' and was somewhat similar to 'rabbi'. While the term Mari expressed the relationship between Jesus and his disciples during his life, the Greek Kyrios came to represent his lordship over the world.

The early Christians placed Kyrios at the center of their understanding, and from that center attempted to understand the other issues related to the Christian mysteries. The question of the deity of Christ in the New Testament is inherently related to the Kyrios title of Jesus used in the early Christian writings and its implications for the absolute lordship of Jesus. In early Christian belief, the concept of Kyrios included the pre-existence of Christ, for they believed if Christ is one with God, he must have been united with God from the very beginning.

== Controversies and ecumenical councils (2nd–8th century) ==
=== Post-Apostolic controversies ===
Following the Apostolic Age, from the second century onwards, a number of controversies developed about how the human and divine are related within the person of Jesus. As of the second century, a number of different and opposing approaches developed among various groups. In contrast to prevailing monoprosopic views on the Person of Christ, alternative dyoprosopic notions were also promoted by some theologians, but such views were rejected by the ecumenical councils. For example, Arianism did not endorse divinity, Ebionism argued Jesus was an ordinary mortal, while Gnosticism held docetic views which argued Christ was a spiritual being who only appeared to have a physical body. The resulting tensions led to schisms within the church in the second and third centuries, and ecumenical councils were convened in the fourth and fifth centuries to deal with the issues.

Although some of the debates may seem to various modern students to be over a theological iota, they took place in controversial political circumstances, reflecting the relations of temporal powers and divine authority, and certainly resulted in schisms, among others that separated the Church of the East from the Church of the Roman Empire.

=== First Council of Nicaea (325) and First Council of Constantinople (381) ===
In 325, the First Council of Nicaea defined the persons of the Godhead and their relationship with one another, decisions which were ratified at the First Council of Constantinople in 381. The language used was that the one God exists in three persons (Father, Son, and Holy Spirit); in particular, it was affirmed that the Son was homoousios (of the same being) as the Father. The Nicene Creed declared the full divinity and full humanity of Jesus. After the First Council of Nicaea in 325 the Logos and the second Person of the Trinity were being used interchangeably.

=== First Council of Ephesus (431) ===
In 431, the First Council of Ephesus was initially called to address the views of Nestorius on Mariology, but the problems soon extended to Christology, and schisms followed. The 431 council was called because in defense of his loyal priest Anastasius, Nestorius had preferred that the title Christokos (Christ-bearer) be used over Theotokos (God-bearer) for Mary and later contradicted Proclus during a sermon in Constantinople. Pope Celestine I (who was already upset with Nestorius due to other matters) wrote about this to Cyril of Alexandria, who orchestrated the council. During the council, Nestorius defended his position by arguing that there are two distinct and separate natures of Christ, one human and the other divine, hence Mary gave birth only to the human nature, suggesting that the title Theotokos (God-bearer) is insufficient to fully describe the Incarnation, as it does not encompass Christ's humanity. The debate about the single or dual nature of Christ ensued in Ephesus.

The First Council of Ephesus debated miaphysitism (two natures united as one after the hypostatic union) versus dyophysitism (coexisting natures after the hypostatic union) versus monophysitism (only one nature) versus Nestorianism (two hypostases). From the Christological viewpoint, the council adopted Mia Physis ('but being made one', κατὰ φύσιν) – Council of Ephesus, Epistle of Cyril to Nestorius, i.e. 'one nature of the Word of God incarnate' (μία φύσις τοῦ θεοῦ λόγου σεσαρκωμένη, mía phýsis toû theoû lógou sesarkōménē). In 451, the Council of Chalcedon affirmed dyophysitism. The Oriental Orthodox rejected this and subsequent councils and continued to consider themselves as miaphysite according to the faith put forth at the Councils of Nicaea and Ephesus. The council also confirmed the Theotokos title and excommunicated Nestorius.

=== Council of Chalcedon (451) ===
Christological spectrum during the 5th–7th centuries showing the views of the Church of the East (light blue), the Eastern Orthodox and Catholic Churches (light purple), and the Miaphysite Churches (pink)

The 451 Council of Chalcedon was highly influential, and marked a key turning point in the christological debates. It is the last council which many Lutherans, Anglicans and other Protestants consider ecumenical.

The Council of Chalcedon fully promulgated the Western dyophysite understanding put forth by Pope Leo I of Rome of the hypostatic union, the proposition that Christ has one human nature (physis) and one divine nature (physis), each distinct and complete, and united with neither confusion nor division. Most of the major branches of Western Christianity (Roman Catholicism, Anglicanism, Lutheranism, and Reformed), Church of the East, Eastern Catholicism and Eastern Orthodoxy subscribe to the Chalcedonian Christological formulation, while Oriental Orthodoxy (in Antioch, Alexandria, Ethiopia, Eritrea, and Armenia) reject it.

Although the Chalcedonian Creed did not put an end to all christological debate, it did clarify the terms used and became a point of reference for many future Christologies. But it also broke apart the church of the Eastern Roman Empire in the fifth century, and unquestionably established the primacy of Rome in the East over those who accepted the Council of Chalcedon. This was reaffirmed in 519, when the Eastern Chalcedonians accepted the Formula of Hormisdas, anathematizing all of their own Eastern Chalcedonian hierarchy, who died out of communion with Rome from 482 to 519.

=== Fifth–Seventh Ecumenical Council (553, 681, 787) ===
The Second Council of Constantinople in 553 interpreted the decrees of Chalcedon, and further explained the relationship of the two natures of Jesus. It also condemned the alleged teachings of Origen on the pre-existence of the soul, and other topics.

The Third Council of Constantinople in 681 declared that Christ has two wills of his two natures, human and divine, contrary to the teachings of the Monothelites, with the divine will having precedence, leading and guiding the human will.

The Second Council of Nicaea was called under the Empress Regent Irene of Athens in 787. It affirmed the veneration of icons while forbidding their worship. It is often referred to as "The Triumph of Orthodoxy".

== Western medieval Christology ==
The Franciscan piety of the 12th and 13th centuries led to "popular Christology". Systematic approaches by theologians, such as Thomas Aquinas, are called "scholastic Christology".

In the 13th century, Thomas Aquinas provided the first systematic Christology that consistently resolved a number of the existing issues. In his Christology from above, Aquinas also championed the principle of perfection of Christ's human attributes.

The Middle Ages also witnessed the emergence of the "tender image of Jesus" as a friend and a living source of love and comfort, rather than just the Kyrios image.

== Reformation ==
Article 10 of the Belgic Confession, a confessional standard of the Reformed faith, subscribes to Nicene orthodoxy regarding the deity of Christ. The article places emphasis on the eternal generation of the Son and the eternal divine nature of Christ as Creator.

We believe that Jesus Christ, according to his divine nature, is the only begotten Son of God, begotten from eternity, not made nor created (for then He should be a creature), but co-essential and co-eternal with the Father, "the express image of His person, and the brightness of His glory" (Hebrews 1:3), equal unto him in all things. He is the Son of God, not only from the time that He assumed our nature, but from all eternity, as these testimonies, when compared together, teach us. Moses says that God created the world; and John saith that "all things were made by that Word" (John 1:3), which he calls God. And the apostle says that God made the worlds by His Son (Hebrews 1:2); likewise, that "God created all things by Jesus Christ" (Ephesians 3:9). Therefore, it must needs follow, that he who is called God, the Word, the Son, and Jesus Christ did exist at that time, when all things were created by him. Therefore, the prophet Micah says, "His goings forth have been from of old, from everlasting" (Micah 5:2). And the apostle: "He has neither beginning of days, nor end of life" (Hebrews 7:3). He therefore is that true, eternal, and almighty God, whom we invoke, worship and serve.

John Calvin maintained there was no human element in the Person of Christ which could be separated from the Person of the Word. Calvin also emphasized the importance of the "Work of Christ" in any attempt at understanding the Person of Christ and cautioned against ignoring the works of Jesus during his ministry.

== Modern developments ==
=== Liberal Protestant theology ===
The 19th century saw the rise of Liberal Protestant theology, which questioned the dogmatic foundations of Christianity, and approached the Bible with critical-historical tools. The divinity of Jesus became of less emphasis or importance, and was replaced with a focus on the ethical aspects of his teachings. (Note: Gerald O'Collins and Daniel Kendall have called this Liberal Protestant theology "neo-Arianism.")

=== Roman Catholicism ===
Catholic theologian Karl Rahner sees the purpose of modern Christology as to formulate the Christian belief that "God became man and that God-made-man is the individual Jesus Christ" in a manner that this statement can be understood consistently, without the confusions of past debates and mythologies. (Note: Grillmeier: "The most urgent task of a contemporary Christology is to formulate the Church's dogma – 'God became man and that God-made-man is the individual Jesus Christ' – in such a way that the true meaning of these statements can be understood, and all trace of a mythology impossible to accept nowadays is excluded.") Rahner pointed out the coincidence between the Person of Christ and the Word of God, referring to Mark 8:38 and Luke 9:26 which state whoever is ashamed of the words of Jesus is ashamed of the Lord himself.

Since the reading of Jesus as a supernatural figure is antithetical to Rabbinic Judaism, Rosemary Radford Ruether argued that the New Testament had to be polemical against "the Jews" who, to the Christian mindset, misread scripture. She says that that Christology implicitly rejects Judaism as an act of revenge for Jewish rejection of Christian doctrine.

Hans von Balthasar argued the union of the human and divine natures of Christ was achieved not by the "absorption" of human attributes, but by their "assumption". Thus, in his view, the divine nature of Christ was not affected by the human attributes and remained forever divine. The same distinction is recorded in the Second Vatican Council's pastoral constitution, Gaudium et spes: "in Him, human nature was assumed, not absorbed".

Pope Francis, in his 2024 encyclical letter Dilexit nos, refers to the "divinity and plenary humanity" of Jesus.

== Topics ==
=== Nativity and the Holy Name ===
The Nativity of Jesus impacted the Christological issues about his person from the earliest days of Christianity. Luke's Christology centers on the dialectics of the dual natures of the earthly and heavenly manifestations of existence of the Christ, while Matthew's Christology focuses on the mission of Jesus and his role as the savior. The salvific emphasis of Matthew 1:21 later impacted the theological issues and the devotions to the Holy Name of Jesus.

Matthew 1:23 provides a key to the "Emmanuel Christology" of Matthew. Beginning with 1:23, the Gospel of Matthew shows a clear interest in identifying Jesus as "God with us" and in later developing the Emmanuel characterization of Jesus at key points throughout the rest of the Gospel. The name 'Emmanuel' does not appear elsewhere in the New Testament, but Matthew builds on it in Matthew 28:20 ("I am with you always, even unto the end of the world") to indicate Jesus will be with the faithful to the end of the age. According to Ulrich Luz, the Emmanuel motif brackets the entire Gospel of Matthew between 1:23 and 28:20, appearing explicitly and implicitly in several other passages.

=== Crucifixion and resurrection ===
The accounts of the crucifixion and subsequent resurrection of Jesus provides a rich background for christological analysis, from the canonical Gospels to the Pauline Epistles.

A central element in the christology presented in the Acts of the Apostles is the affirmation of the belief that the death of Jesus by crucifixion happened "with the foreknowledge of God, according to a definite plan". In this view, as in Acts 2:23, the cross is not viewed as a scandal, for the crucifixion of Jesus "at the hands of the lawless" is viewed as the fulfilment of the plan of God.

Paul's Christology has a specific focus on the death and resurrection of Jesus. For Paul, the crucifixion of Jesus is directly related to his resurrection and the term "the cross of Christ" used in Galatians 6:12 may be viewed as his abbreviation of the message of the Gospels. For Paul, the crucifixion of Jesus was not an isolated event in history, but a cosmic event with significant eschatological consequences, as in 1 Corinthians 2:8. In the Pauline view, Jesus, obedient to the point of death (Philippians 2:8), died "at the right time" (Romans 5:6) based on the plan of God. For Paul, the "power of the cross" is not separable from the resurrection of Jesus.

=== Threefold office ===
The threefold office (Latin munus triplex) of Jesus Christ is a Christian doctrine based upon the teachings of the Old Testament. It was described by Eusebius and more fully developed by John Calvin. It states that Jesus Christ performed three functions (or "offices") in his earthly ministry – those of prophet, priest, and king. In the Old Testament, the appointment of someone to any of these three positions could be indicated by anointing him or her by pouring oil over the head. Thus, the term messiah, meaning "anointed one", is associated with the concept of the threefold office. While the office of king is that most frequently associated with the Messiah, the role of Jesus as priest is also prominent in the New Testament, being most fully explained in chapters 7 to 10 of the Book of Hebrews.

=== Mariology ===
Some Christians, notably Roman Catholics, view Mariology as a key component of Christology. (Note: "Mariology Is Christology", in Vittorio Messori, The Mary Hypothesis, Rome: 2005.) In this view, not only is Mariology a logical and necessary consequence of Christology, but without it, Christology is incomplete, since the figure of Mary contributes to a fuller understanding of who Christ is and what he did.

Protestants have criticized Mariology because many of its assertions lack any Biblical foundation. Strong Protestant reaction against Roman Catholic Marian devotion and teaching has been a significant issue for ecumenical dialogue.

Cardinal Joseph Ratzinger (later Pope Benedict XVI) expressed this sentiment about Roman Catholic Mariology when in two separate occasions he stated, "The appearance of a truly Marian awareness serves as the touchstone indicating whether or not the christological substance is fully present" and "It is necessary to go back to Mary, if we want to return to the truth about Jesus Christ."

=== Angelmorphic Christology ===
While scholarship near universally rejects the view that the earliest Christians saw Christ as an angel or based on Michael traditions, parallels between Jewish angelology and Christology have been taken up, and discussion is now focused on an "angelmorphic Christology". Charles Gieschen noted that while much of New Testament studies view it as a later developed tradition and remain unconvinced, he instead argues Jewish angelmorphic traditions that exalt figures to positions of divine mediator, had played a role in the development and origin of other Christologies. Research in divine mediator figures was popular in the late 20th century with Crispin Fletcher Louis, Brittany Wilson, and Michael Bird as leading figures today. Michael Bird compares Jesus to the philosophical Demiurge, the Logos philosophy, divine Wisdom, as well as angels and exalted patriarchs while maintaining independence from such categories. Brittany Wilson writes that Luke's Gospel presents the risen Jesus's appearances in a way similar to angelic manifestations and that the Synoptic Gospels describe Jesus ans an exalted human figure like the Son of Man and Messiah who straddle divinity and humanity.

== See also ==
- Catholic spirituality
- Christian messianic prophecies
- Christian views of Jesus
- Christological argument
- Crucifixion of Jesus
- Doubting Thomas
- Eucharist
- Eutychianism
- Five Holy Wounds
- Genealogy of Jesus
- Great Church
- Great Tribulation
- Harrowing of Hell
- Kingship and Kingdom of God
- Last Judgement
- Life of Jesus in the New Testament
- Miracles of Jesus
- Names and titles of Jesus in the New Testament
- Religious perspectives on Jesus
- Paterology
- Pneumatology
- Rapture
- Scholastic Lutheran Christology
- Second Coming of Christ
- Symbolism of domes
- Transfiguration of Jesus
- Universal resurrection

== Sources ==
Printed sources

- Armentrout, Donald S.; Boak Slocum, Robert (2005), An Episcopal dictionary of the church, Church Publishing, ISBN 978-0-89869-211-2
- Baker, Mark D. (2006). Proclaiming the Scandal of the Cross: Contemporary Images of the Atonement. Baker Academic. ISBN 978-1-4412-0627-5. Archived from the original on 26 March 2023.
- Bauckham, R. (2011), Jesus: A Very Short Introduction, Oxford University Press
- Beilby, James K.; Eddy, Paul R. (2009), The Nature of the Atonement: Four Views, InterVarsity Press
- Bermejo-Rubio, Fernando (2017). Feldt, Laura; Valk, Ülo (eds.). "The Process of Jesus' Deification and Cognitive Dissonance Theory". Numen. 64 (2–3). Leiden: Brill Publishers: 119–152. doi:10.1163/15685276-12341457. eISSN 1568-5276. ISSN 0029-5973. JSTOR 44505332. S2CID 148616605.
- Beversluis, Joel Diederik (2000), Sourcebook of the world's religions, New World Library, ISBN 978-1-57731-121-8
- Bird, Michael F.; Evans, Craig A.; Gathercole, Simon (2014), "Endnotes – Chapter 1", How God Became Jesus: The Real Origins of Belief in Jesus' Divine Nature – A Response to Bart Ehrman, Zondervan, ISBN 978-0-310-51961-4
- Bird, Michael F. (2017), Jesus the Eternal Son: Answering Adoptionist Christology, Wim. B. Eerdmans Publishing
- Brown, Raymond Edward (2004), An Introduction to New Testament Christology, Paulist Press
- Chilton, Bruce. "The Son of Man: Who Was He?" Bible Review. August 1996, 35+.
- Cullmann, Oscar (1980). The Christology of the New Testament. trans. Louisville: Westminster John Knox Press. ISBN 0-664-24351-7
- Davis, Leo Donald (1990), The First Seven Ecumenical Councils (325–787): Their History and Theology (Theology and Life Series 21), Collegeville, MN: Michael Glazier/Liturgical Press, ISBN 978-0-8146-5616-7
- Dunn, James D. G. (2003), Jesus Remembered: Christianity in the Making, Wm. B. Eerdmans Publishing, ISBN 978-0-8028-3931-2
- Ehrman, Bart D. (1993), The Orthodox corruption of scripture: the effect of early Christological controversies on the text of the New Testament, New York: Oxford University Press, ISBN 978-0-19-510279-6, archived from the original on 14 December 2023
- Ehrman, Bart D. (2003), Lost Christianities: The Battles for Scripture and the Faiths We Never Knew, Oxford University Press, ISBN 978-0-19-972712-4, archived from the original on 14 December 2023
- Ehrman, Bart (2014), How Jesus became God: The Exaltation of a Jewish Preacher from Galilee, Harper Collins
- Espín, Orlando O.; Nickoloff, James B. (2007), An introductory dictionary of theology and religious studies, Liturgical Press, ISBN 978-0-8146-5856-7
- Fahlbusch, Erwin (1999), The encyclopedia of Christianity, Brill
- Fuller, Reginald H. (1965). The Foundations of New Testament Christology. New York: Scribners. ISBN 0-684-15532-X
- Greene, Colin J.D. (2004). Christology in Cultural Perspective: Marking Out the Horizons. Grand Rapids: Eerdmans Publishing. ISBN 0-8028-2792-6
- Grillmeier, Alois (1975), "Jesus Christ: III. Christology", in Rahner, Karl (ed.), Encyclopedia of Theology: A Concise Sacramentum Mundi (reprint ed.), A&C Black, ISBN 9780860120063
- Grillmeier, Aloys; Bowden, John (1975), Christ in Christian Tradition: From the Apostolic Age to Chalcedon, Westminster John Knox Press, ISBN 978-0-664-22301-4
- Hodgson, Peter C. (1994). Winds of the Spirit: A Constructive Christian Theology. Louisville: Westminster John Knox Press.
- Hurtado, Larry W. (2003), Lord Jesus Christ: Devotion to Jesus in Earliest Christianity, Eerdmans, ISBN 978-0802860705, OCLC 51623141
- Kärkkäinen, Veli-Matti (2016), Christology: A Global Introduction, Baker Academic
- Kingsbury, Jack Dean (1989). The Christology of Mark's Gospel. Philadelphia: Fortress Press.
- Letham, Robert. The Work of Christ. Contours of Christian Theology. Downer Grove: IVP, 1993, ISBN 0-8308-1532-5
- Loke, Andrew Ter Ern (2017), The Origin of Divine Christology, vol. 169, Cambridge University Press, ISBN 978-1-108-19142-5
- Mack, Burton L. (1995), Who wrote the New Testament? The making of the Christian myth, Harper San Francisco, ISBN 978-0-06-065517-4
- McGrath, Alister E. (2006), Christianity: an introduction, Wiley, ISBN 978-1-4051-0901-7
- MacLeod, Donald (1998). The Person of Christ: Contours of Christian Theology. Downer Grove: IVP, ISBN 0-8308-1537-6
- McGrath, Alister E. (2007), Christian theology: an introduction, Malden, Mass.: Blackwell, ISBN 978-1-4051-5360-7, archived from the original on 14 December 2023
- Meyendorff, John (1989). Imperial unity and Christian divisions: The Church 450–680 A.D. The Church in history. Vol. 2. Crestwood, NY: St. Vladimir's Seminary Press. ISBN 978-0-88-141056-3. Archived from the original on 12 January 2023.
- Netland, Harold (2001), Encountering Religious Pluralism: The Challenge to Christian Faith & Mission, InterVarsity Press
- O'Collins, Gerald; Kendall, Daniel (1996), Focus on Jesus: Essays in Christology and Soteriology, Gracewing Publishing
- O'Collins, Gerald (2009), Christology: A Biblical, Historical, and Systematic Study of Jesus, OUP Oxford, ISBN 978-0-19-955787-5
- Packer, J. I. (1973), What did the Cross Achieve? The Logic of Penal Substitution, Tyndale Biblical Theology Lecture
- Pannenberg, Wolfhart (1968), Jesus God and Man, Westminster John Knox Press, ISBN 978-0-664-24468-2
- Wolfhart Pannenberg, Systematic Theology, T & T Clark, 1994 Vol.2.
- Price, Richard; Gaddis, Michael (2006), The acts of the Council of Chalcedon, Liverpool University Press, ISBN 978-0-85323-039-7
- Pugh, Ben (2015), Atonement Theories: A Way through the Maze, James Clarke & Co
- Rahner, Karl (2004), Encyclopedia of theology: a concise Sacramentum mundi, A&C Black, ISBN 978-0-86012-006-3
- Ramm, Bernard L. (1993), "Christology at the Center", An Evangelical Christology: Ecumenic and Historic, Regent College Publishing, ISBN 9781573830089
- Rausch, Thomas P. (2003), Who is Jesus? : an introduction to Christology, Liturgical Press, ISBN 978-0-8146-5078-3
- Schwarz, Hans (1998). Christology. Grand Rapids: Eerdmans Publishing. ISBN 0-8028-4463-4
- Talbert, Charles H. (2011), The Development of Christology during the First Hundred Years: and Other Essays on Early Christian Christology. Supplements to Novum Testamentum 140, Brill
- Taylor, Vincent (1956), The Cross of Christ, Macmillan & Co
- Weaver, J. Denny (2001), The Nonviolent Atonement, Wm. B. Eerdmans Publishing
- Witherington, Ben (2009), "Christology – Paul's christology", in Hawthorne, Gerald F.; Martin, Ralph P.; Reid, Daniel G. (eds.), Dictionary of Paul and His Letters: A Compendium of Contemporary Biblical Scholarship, InterVarsity Press, ISBN 978-0-8308-7491-0

Web-sources
