= Brant Pitre =

New Testament scholar

Brant J. Pitre
- Born: 1975 (age 50–51); New Orleans, Louisiana, US

Academic background
- Education: Louisiana State University (BA); Tel Aviv University (GC); Vanderbilt University Divinity School (MTS.); University of Notre Dame (PhD)
- Thesis: The Historical Jesus, the Great Tribulation and the End of the Exile: Restoration Eschatology and the Origin of the Atonement (2004)

Academic work
- Discipline: Theology
- Sub-discipline: New Testament; Early Christianity; Historical Jesus
- Institutions: Augustine Institute; Notre Dame Seminary; Our Lady of Holy Cross College; University of Notre Dame; Loyola University New Orleans

Brant James Pitre (born 1975) is an American New Testament scholar and Distinguished Research Professor of Scripture at the Augustine Institute. He has written on the historical Jesus, the Virgin Mary, Paul the Apostle, the origin of the Eucharist, and the canonical Gospels.

== Early life and education ==
Pitre was born in 1975. Pitre engaged in Biblical studies after receiving his B.A. in Philosophy and English Literature from Louisiana State University in 1997. In 1998, he received a G.C. in biblical archaeology in from Tel Aviv University, and in 1999 he received a M.T.S. from Vanderbilt University Divinity School. In 2004, he received a Ph.D. from the University of Notre Dame. While at Vanderbilt, Pitre studied under Professor Amy-Jill Levine and he studied under Father John P. Meier at Notre Dame.

== Career ==
He was assistant professor of theology at Loyola University New Orleans from 2003 to 2005. From 2005 to 2009, he was adjunct professor of Scripture at Notre Dame Seminary, Visiting professor of theology at the University of Notre Dame and Donum Dei Professor of Word and Sacrament and assistant professor of theology at Our Lady of Holy Cross College. From 2009 to 2018 he served as Professor of Sacred Scripture at Notre Dame Seminary, before moving to his current position at the Augustine Institute. He is a member of the Society of Biblical Literature, and the Catholic Biblical Association.

In his works, Pitre has consistently defended the Catholic dogma of transubstantiation, the perpetual virginity of Mary, the divinity of Jesus, and traditional authorship of the Gospels. His books have been praised by Bishop Robert Barron and several Roman Catholic leaders. He was also a contributor to the Dictionary of Jesus And the Gospels, where he wrote articles about Jewish eschatology in regard to Jesus.

== Reception ==
Brant Pitre's work has been praised by various scholars, including Dale Allison, Chris Tilling, Tucker Ferda, and Christine Jacobi. Matthew Levering described Pitre as "the preeminent Catholic historical-Jesus scholar alive today—and indeed as one of the most important Christian thinkers of the twenty-first century."

K. J. Drake describes Jesus and Divine Christology as a ‘lucid, well-researched, and tightly argued monograph’ that effectively demonstrates clear evidence of the authenticity of Jesus’s self-perception as divine. Drake writes that the rejection or neglect of Jesus’s claims to divinity in historical Jesus studies stands increasingly incongruously with the growing consensus that the earliest Christology portrayed Jesus as a divine being. Duke’s Jimmy Myers finds Pitre’s case for Jesus’s self-presentation as a divine messiah to be compelling and Pitre’s knowledge of Second Temple Judaism obvious, despite some difficult interpretations.

Kristin Cox wrote about the same book "Pitre offers a convincing counterpoint to the prevailing opinions in contemporary scholarship." Heejun Yang notes that Pitre's book is acting against the prevailing consensus. Kamy Hanna expressed the same idea. Crisis Magazine wrote "While most contemporary scholars believe Jesus did not claim divinity, most scholars do agree there was a High Christology in the early Church."

The Imaginative Conservative says that Pitre's book The Case for Jesus is a work of apologetics. Trent Horn agrees that Pitre is an apologist.

== Personal life ==
Pitre is a Catholic and lives in Louisiana with his wife, Elizabeth, and their five children.

== Bibliography ==
- Jesus, the Tribulation, and the End of the Exile, Mohr Siebeck, 2005, doi:10.1628/978-3-16-157488-7, ISBN 978-3-16-157488-7.
- Pitre, Brant (February 2, 2016). Jesus and the Jewish Roots of the Eucharist: Unlocking the Secrets of the Last Supper. Image. p. 256. ISBN 978-0385531863.
- Jesus the Bridegroom: The Greatest Love Story Ever Told, Crown Publishing, 2014, ISBN 9780770435455.
- Jesus and the Last Supper, Eerdmans, 2015, ISBN 9780802875334.
- The Case for Jesus: The Biblical and Historical Evidence for Christ, Crown Publishing, 2016, ISBN 9780770435486.
- A Catholic Introduction to the Bible: The Old Testament, Ignatius Press, 2018.
- Pitre, Brant (January 2018). Jesus and the Jewish Roots of Mary: Unveiling the Mother of the Messiah. Image. p. 228. ISBN 9780525616351.
- Paul, a New Covenant Jew: Rethinking Pauline Theology, co-authored with Michael P. Barber and John A. Kincaid, Eerdmans, 2019, ISBN 9780802873767.
- Introduction to the Spiritual Life: Walking the Path of Prayer with Jesus, Crown Publishing, 2021, ISBN 9780525572763.
- Jesus and Divine Christology, Eerdmans, 2024, ISBN 9780802875129.
