= Nease =

Nease is a surname. Notable people with the surname include:

- Allen Nease (1914–1984), American conservationist
- Floyd Nease, multiple people
- Mike Nease (born 1961), American football player
- Orval J. Nease (1891–1950), American Nazarene minister
- Stephen W. Nease (1925–2006), American educator and college president
- Steve Nease, Canadian cartoonist
