= Edward S. Mann =

President of the Eastern Nazarene College

Edward Stebbins Mann (1908–2005) was the president of the Eastern Nazarene College.

== Early life and career ==
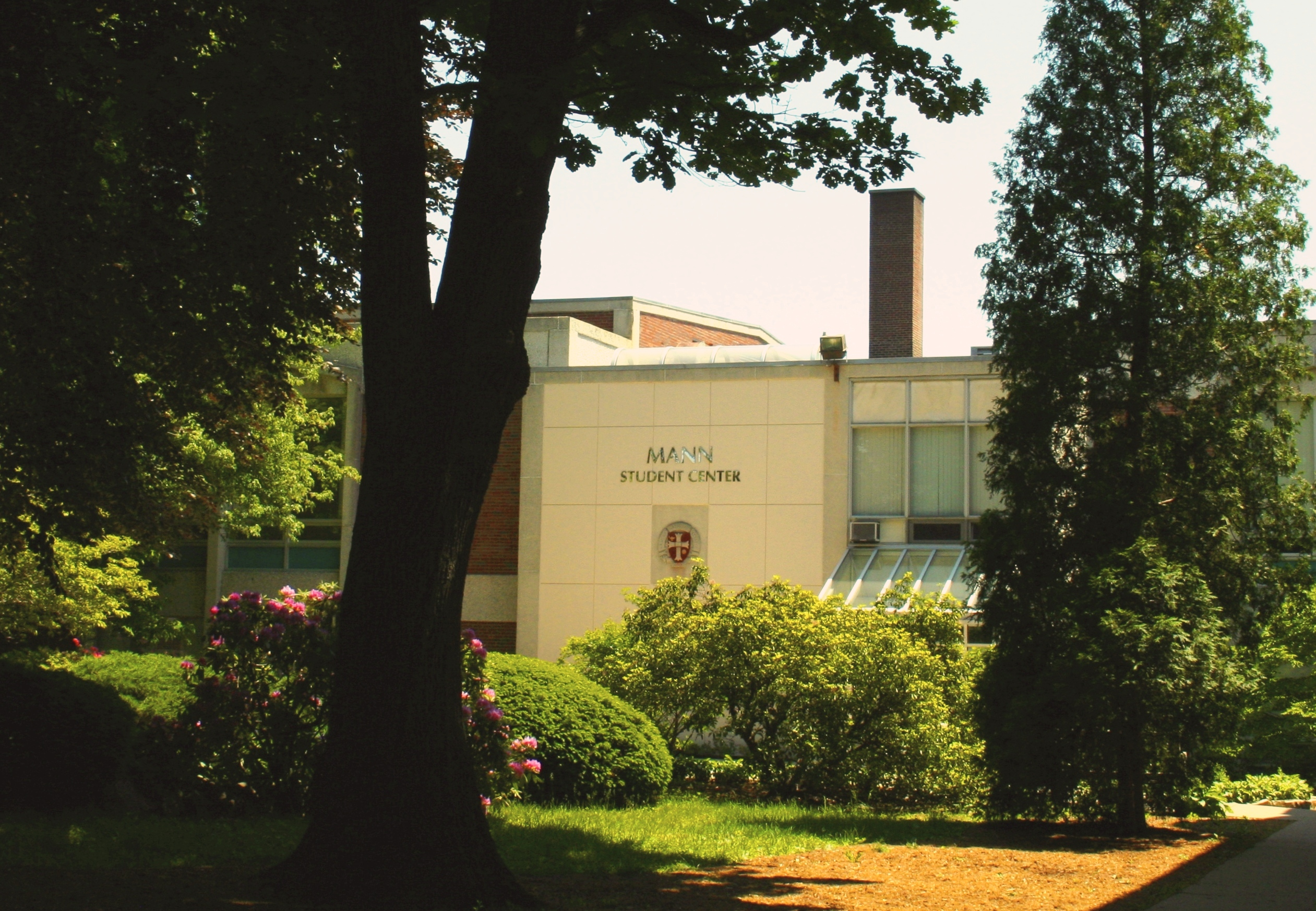
Mann Student Center on the main campus of the Eastern Nazarene College in Massachusetts

Mann was born September 24, 1908, in Waterville, Vermont, the son of a state senator. In 1925, at the age of 16, he enrolled at Eastern Nazarene College. As a student, he helped raise funds for the school's first baseball diamond, later raising more funds and helping dig the foundation for the school's first gymnasium.

Mann started teaching at Eastern Nazarene as a math professor in 1929 and became the assistant to the president, Gideon B. Williamson, in 1941. He also served as dean of men and business manager before he became vice-president of the college in 1945, and was elected president in 1948, a position he held until 1970. He was the college's longest-serving president and it was during his tenure that such things as intervarsity athletics began at the college. Speaking at a North Quincy High School commencement in 1958, Mann is quoted as having said: "The attitude one takes toward work is an indication of the kind of person he is. Most people can be classified by their reactions when faced with a difficult task. ... Men need to learn that happiness does not come through idleness but through hard, honest toil."

He was also elected president of the General Board and executive secretary of the Board of Education for the Church of the Nazarene in 1966 and 1970, respectively. In addition, he was a member of the Quincy School Committee, where he served for 10 years, a member of the Quincy Rotary Club and the Quincy Historical Society, and director of the Evangelistic Association of New England. He received the Benjamin Franklin Hodginson Award for Outstanding Service to Quincy in 1963 and the Quincy Jaycees Distinguished Service Award in 1968. He was named President Emeritus of Eastern Nazarene College in 1983, upon returning to Quincy.

== Education ==
Mann graduated with a bachelor's degree in mathematics from Eastern Nazarene College in 1929 and a master's degree in mathematics from Boston University in 1932. He also received an honorary doctor of laws degree from Northwest Nazarene College in 1949 and earned a doctor of divinity degree from the University of Vermont in 1966.

== Family and hobbies ==
Mann married his college sweetheart, Cora Herrschaft, in 1932. Cora was from Brooklyn, New York, graduated from Eastern Nazarene herself in 1932, and died at the age of 81 in 1988. He remarried in 1989 to Katherine (Brown) Angell, widowed daughter-in-law of Ernest E. Angell. Mann had four sons, Edward, Merritt, Robert, and Richard, and three stepchildren, Gary, Gordon, and Katherine Angell. A sports fan, he attended ENC sports events and followed the Boston Red Sox. He also enjoyed vacationing at his cottage, Hearthside, on Lake Champlain in Vermont.

== Notes and references ==
Academic offices
Preceded by Samuel Young	President of the Eastern Nazarene College; 1948–1970	Succeeded by A. Leslie Parrott, Jr.
