= Timothy L. Smith =

American historian

Timothy Lawrence Smith
- Born: April 13, 1924; South Carolina
- Died: January 20, 1997 (aged 72); West Palm Beach, Florida
- Occupations: Historian, Educator
- Known for: First American Evangelical Historian to become notable in research and higher education

Timothy Lawrence Smith (April 13, 1924 – January 20, 1997) was a historian and educator, known for his research and higher education.

== Early life and education ==
Smith was born April 13, 1924 in Central, South Carolina, the son of Nazarene ministers. He earned his bachelor's and master's degrees from the University of Virginia, where he was a Jefferson Scholar and Phi Beta Kappa student, and his doctoral degree in history from Harvard University under Arthur M. Schlesinger, Sr.

== Career ==
He has been described as "the first evangelical historian in the U.S. to make it in the secular research university."

Smith began his teaching career at the Eastern Nazarene College (ENC) in 1949 and left in 1954 to take a position at East Texas State University. During his time at ENC, he was the first director of Quincy School Department-sponsored College Courses, Inc., after which fellow Eastern Nazarene history professor Charles W. Akers transformed it into Quincy Junior College and served as its first full-time director. He later went on the teach at the University of Minnesota before becoming director of the American Religious History doctoral program and Chair of the Education Department at the Johns Hopkins University, where he taught for 25 years.

Smith received numerous awards and honors, and served as president of both the American Society of Church History, and the Society of Religious Historians. He was also an ordained elder in the Church of the Nazarene, and pastored churches in Massachusetts, Maine, and Colorado.

== Published works ==
An author who published in nearly every historical journal, Smith's most-praised work is his 1957 book Revivalism and Social Reform, formed from his dissertation from Harvard, which received the Brewer prize from the American Society of Church History. Smith also wrote a history of the Church of the Nazarene, Called Unto Holiness, which Smith considered his most outstanding accomplishment.

== Legacy ==
Smith retired to Burke, Virginia, and later died at age 72 in West Palm Beach, Florida on January 20, 1997, after several strokes.

The Wesleyan Theological Society at Northwest Nazarene University established a book award in honor of Smith and Mildred Bangs Wynkoop in 1999, and presents an award annually.
