= Kenneth H. Pearsall =

American ordained minister and academic administrator

Kenneth Pearsall

8th President of Northwest Nazarene University
- In office 1973–1983
- Preceded by: John E. Riley
- Succeeded by: A. Gordon Wetmore

Personal details
- Born: 1918 New York City, New York, U.S.
- Died: 1999 (aged 81) Nampa, Idaho, U.S.
- Children: Joel Pearsall
- Education: Eastern Nazarene College (BA)

Kenneth H. Pearsall (1918 – 1999) was an American ordained minister and academic administrator who served as the 8th president of Northwest Nazarene University from 1973 to 1983.

== Early life and education ==
Ken Pearsall was born 1918 in New York City, the son of Hazel and Nelson D. Pearsall. He received his undergraduate education at the Eastern Nazarene College (ENC) in Massachusetts. He later received honorary doctor of divinity degrees from ENC and the College of Idaho.

== Career ==
Pearsall was ordained in 1946 by the Metro New York District Church of the Nazarene and pastored in New York before joining the administration of alma mater Eastern Nazarene. He then left to pastor churches in Ohio and Washington before his election as District Superintendent of the Albany District Church of the Nazarene in 1962. He was elected District Superintendent of the New England District Church of the Nazarene in 1968 and president of the Northwest Nazarene College (NNC) in 1973. It was under Pearsall that master's degrees were first offered at NNC.

== Personal life ==
He retired in 1984 and lived in Nampa, Idaho until his death in 1999 at the age of 81. In 2016, Pearsall's son, Joel Pearsall, was selected to serve as the 13th president of Northwest Nazarene University.
