= Ambrose University =

Christian university in Calgary, Alberta, Canada

- Former names: Calgary Bible Institute, Alberta School of Evangelism, Northern Bible College, Canadian Nazarene College, Nazarene University College; Canadian Bible Institute, Western Canadian Bible Institute, Canadian Bible College of the Christian and Missionary Alliance, Canadian Theological Seminary, Alliance University College; Nazarene University College-Alliance University College (NUC-AUC); Ambrose University College
- Established: 1921
- Religious affiliation: Christian and Missionary Alliance, Church of the Nazarene
- Academic affiliations: ATS (Graduate Theological Degrees), CHEC (Undergraduate Theological Degrees), CCCU
- Chairperson: Debi Mills
- President: Bryce Ashlin-Mayo
- Students: 487 (2025)
- Location: Calgary, Alberta, Canada; 51.0342°N 114.1933°W
- Colours: Gold, white, black
- Nickname: Lions
- Mascot: Lion
- Website: ambrose.edu

Ambrose University is a publicly funded independent Christian liberal arts university located in Calgary, Alberta, Canada.

== Overview ==
The university was formed in 2007, when Alliance University College and Nazarene University College merged, and named in honor of Saint Ambrose.

It provides undergraduate and graduate level education for pastoral ministry, as well as undergraduate level education in select liberal arts and science degrees. The Graduate School of Theology also offers a Chinese Program (TSC - Theological Studies in Chinese).

== History ==
Ambrose University is the product of an educational journeys which began in the second half of the twentieth century.

Alliance University College (AUC) was originally established in 1941. The Western Canadian District of the Christian and Missionary Alliance established the Canadian Bible Institute in Regina, Saskatchewan, in 1941. It was established under Gordon Skitch, superintendent of the Western Canadian District of the CMA, Willis Brooks, pastor of the Regina Alliance Tabernacle and George Blackett, former principal of Winnipeg Bible Institute and future principal and president of the new institute. In 1949, it was Western Canadian Bible Institute (WCBI). It was renamed again in 1957 as the Canadian Bible College (CBC). The Canadian Theological College (CTC) was established in 1970 as a graduate sister school to CBC, and was renamed Canadian Theological Seminary (CTS) in 1982.

Nazarene University College (NUC) was first established in 1921 in the basement of the Calgary First Church of the Nazarene. In 1927, the school relocated to Red Deer, and was named Alberta School of Evangelism, and then Northern Bible College (NBC) In 1940, it began offering theology degrees and was renamed again as the Canadian Nazarene College (CNC). In 1960, CNC moved to Winnipeg and was established as the official Canadian university college for the Church of the Nazarene. CNC moved back to Calgary in 1995, became an accredited university college in 1999, and changed its name to Nazarene University College (NUC).

In 2003, CBC/CTS officially relocated to join NUC on the same campus, received accreditation in 2004, and changed its name to Alliance University College (AUC).

AUC and NUC maintained a close relationship and were often referred to as Alliance University College-Nazarene University College (AUC-NUC), though the two granted degrees independently until 2007.

In 2007, AUC and NUC became a single institution, known as Ambrose University College, in honour of Saint Ambrose. A new campus opened in west Calgary the following year.

In 2012 Gordon T. Smith was named president.

In 2014, Premier and Minister of Innovation and Advanced Education Dave Hancock approved the change of name to Ambrose University, dropping the word "College" to better reflect the nature of the institution.

In April of 2023, Dr. Smith announced a plan to retire from his role as president and began the process of transitioning out of leadership. At that time, the Board of Governors Presidential Search Committee began its process of finding a candidate for the presidency. On January 15, 2024, the Search Committee, on behalf of the Board of Governors, announced that Rev. Dr. Bryce Ashlin-Mayo, the Dean of Theology and the Seminary, would be the next President of Ambrose University. Dr. Ashlin-Mayo officially took office on May 6, 2024. As of now, no changes to the President's cabinet have been made known and the Dean of Theology role remains vacant.

== Affiliation ==
Ambrose is the official Canadian school of both the Church of the Nazarene and The Christian and Missionary Alliance. It is one of 10 colleges and universities affiliated with the Church of the Nazarene in North America and one of 8 colleges and universities affiliated with The Christian and Missionary Alliance. It is the Nazarene institute for the Canada field.

It is also an affiliate of the Council for Christian Colleges and Universities.

The Jaffray Centre for Global Initiatives was founded in coordination with Ambrose University. The institution is now separate but maintains a close relationship with Ambrose University. The Jaffray Centre's director is Dr. Charles Cook.

The Canadian Poverty Institute was also founded in coordination with Ambrose University. The Canadian Poverty Institute, which is also separate from Ambrose, is housed in Ambrose University's main and only campus. The Canadian Poverty Institute's director is Derek Cook.

Ambrose University's Undergraduate Student Council is affiliated with a local municipal lobby group, the Calgary Student's Alliance, and a provincial lobby group, the Alberta Student's Executive Council (ASEC).

== Academics ==
Ambrose's mission is to "produce graduates who are consciously and actively Christian in all aspects of life," and to "serve the church by providing excellent preparation for pastoral ministry.".

In 2023 AU offered 255 courses to 920 students. Students come from over 30 Christian denominations and traditions.

AU provides undergraduate and graduate-level education for pastoral ministry, as well as undergraduate level education in select liberal arts and science degrees. In 2021 the School of Business at AU was officially launched as a separate program school.

Ambrose is accredited by the Association of Theological Schools in the United States and Canada to offer its Seminary degrees. The university is also accredited by the Association for Biblical Higher Education to offer undergraduate ministry and theology degrees, and by the Province of Alberta in the conferring of undergraduate degrees in selected disciplines.

== Notable persons ==
- Cecil R. Paul — president of the Eastern Nazarene College (1989-1992), Canadian Nazarene College alumnus
