= Winfield House (Quincy, Massachusetts) =

Historic house in Massachusetts, United States

- U.S. National Register of Historic Places
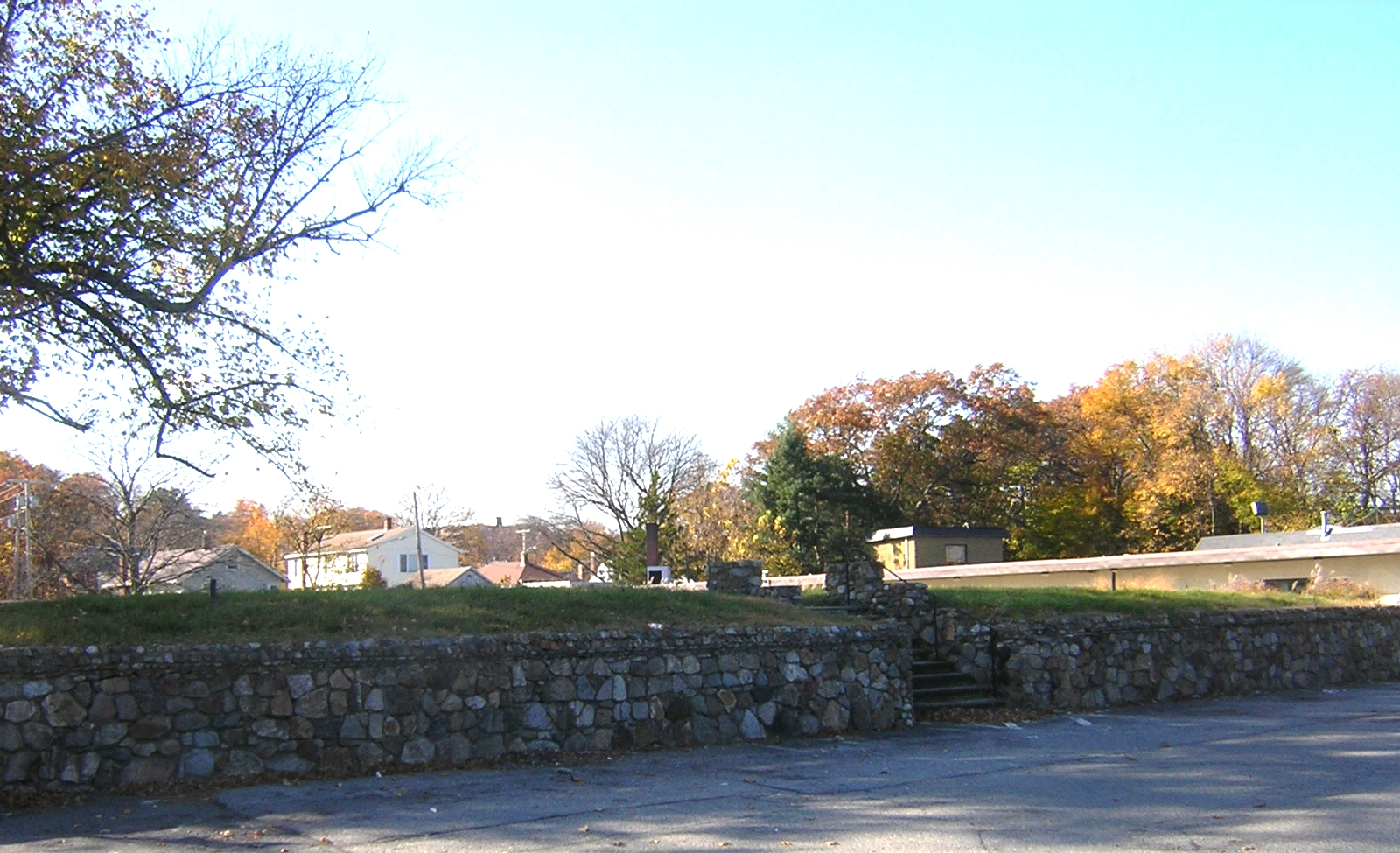

- Location within Massachusetts Location within the United States
- Location: 853 Hancock St., Quincy, Massachusetts
- Coordinates: 42°15′43.7″N 71°0′44″W
- Area: less than one acre
- Built: 1880
- Architectural style: Queen Anne
- MPS: Quincy MRA
- NRHP reference No.: 89001347
- Added to NRHP: September 20, 1989

The Winfield House was a historic house at 853 Hancock Street in Quincy, Massachusetts. Built c. 1880, it was a 2 1/2-story wood-frame structure with exuberant Queen Anne styling. It was built by John Chamberlin, a traveling hardware salesman. The house was particularly distinctive for its onion-domed tower near the center of the structure, an unusual placement and topping for such a tower. It was listed on the National Register of Historic Places in 1989.

Winfield House served as a restaurant for 50 years. The house was demolished in 1998 by its then owners, Eastern Nazarene College, to make way for a campus expansion; all that is left now is stairs leading up to an empty house lot and the elm tree. The carriage house and a portion of the main house floating staircase were moved to a private residence in Stoughton, MA.

== See also ==
- National Register of Historic Places listings in Quincy, Massachusetts
