= Bradley Field =

Bradley Field may refer to several places in the United States:

- Bradley International Airport in Windsor Locks, Connecticut
- Bradley Air National Guard Base, the military portion of Bradley International Airport
- The baseball field at the Eastern Nazarene College in Quincy, Massachusetts
