= Floyd Nease =

Floyd Nease may refer to:

- Floyd W. Nease, president of the Eastern Nazarene College from 1924 to 1930
- Floyd Nease (politician), his grandson, the former Democratic Majority Leader for the Vermont State House
