= Joel Pearsall =

American lawyer

13th President of Northwest Nazarene University
- Incumbent
- Assumed office October 2016
- Preceded by: David Alexander

Personal details
- Relations: Kenneth Pearsall (father)
- Education: Northwest Nazarene University (BA); Willamette University (JD)

Joel K. Pearsall is an American attorney, academic administrator, and former church administrator serving as the president of Northwest Nazarene University in Nampa, Idaho.

== Early life and education ==
Pearsall's father, Kenneth H. Pearsall, served as president of Northwest Nazarene University from 1973 to 1983.

Pearsall earned a Bachelor of Arts degree in accounting and business administration from Northwest Nazarene University in 1980. He then earned a Juris Doctor from the Willamette University College of Law.

== Career ==
After graduating from law school, Pearsall served as a law clerk for Charles R. Donaldson on the Idaho Supreme Court. He then operated a private legal practice in Salem, Oregon, where he specialized in business law, tax law, and employee benefit planning. Pearsall later worked as a church administrator. He returned to Northwest Nazarene University in 1999 as vice president for financial affairs and in-house legal counsel, serving until 2008. In August 2008, Pearsall became vice president for university advancement.

In 2016, Pearsall was selected to serve as the 13th president of Northwest Nazarene University. At the time of his appointment, Pearsall had been serving as president in an acting capacity after the resignation of David Alexander amid allegations that Alexander has conducted a relationship with a student while working as a professor. Pearsall's four-year contract was renewed in 2020.
