= Samuel Young (general superintendent) =

American Nazarene minister and university president

General Superintendent in the Church of the Nazarene
- In office 1948–1972

President of Eastern Nazarene College
- In office 1944–1948
- Preceded by: Gideon B. Williamson
- Succeeded by: Edward S. Mann

Personal details
- Born: 1901 Glasgow, Scotland
- Died: 1990 (aged 88–89) Shawnee Mission, Kansas
- Education: Eastern Nazarene College; Boston University

Samuel Young (1901–1990) was president of Eastern Nazarene College in Quincy, Massachusetts, from 1944 to 1948 and general superintendent in the Church of the Nazarene from 1948 to 1972. Young's son, Donald, would attend the Eastern Nazarene College and later become an interim president of Quincy College. which he saved from losing educational accreditation in 1994.

A native of Glasgow, Scotland, Young joined the Parkhead Church of the Nazarene in Glasgow. After coming to the United States with his parents at age 15 and settling in Cleveland, Ohio, he graduated from Eastern Nazarene College in 1928 and received a master's degree from Boston University in 1930, as well as being named an honorary doctor of divinity from Eastern Nazarene in 1945. Prior to taking the presidency at Eastern Nazarene, Young had been pastor of the Wollaston Church of the Nazarene for five years and head of the department of theology at the college. Young was elected General Superintendent of the Church of the Nazarene in 1948, and retired from his post in Kansas City in 1972 to Overland Park, Kansas. He died on January 25, 1990, at the age of 88, in Shawnee Mission, Kansas.

== Notes and references ==
Academic offices
Preceded by Gideon B. Williamson	President of the Eastern Nazarene College; 1944–1948	Succeeded by Edward S. Mann
