= Kent R. Hill =

American academic administrator

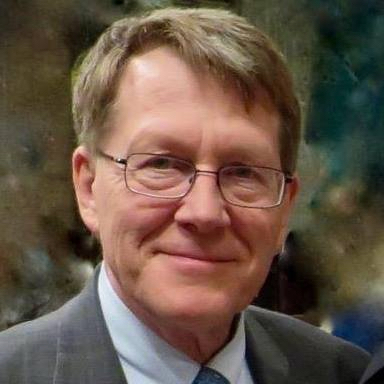
Former USAID Assistant Administrator for the Bureau for Global Health Kent Hill (2016)

Kent Richmond Hill (born May 24, 1949) is an American academic administrator. He is Senior Fellow for Eurasia, Middle East, and Islam at the Religious Freedom Institute in Washington, D.C..

== Career ==
Kent Hill is Senior Fellow for Eurasia, Middle East, and Islam at the Religious Freedom Institute and previously served as Executive Director and Director of the Middle East Action Team from September 2016 - May 2019.

Hill was Senior Vice President of International Programs for World Vision, U.S., from February 2011 until August 2016.

From February 2009 to 2011 he was Vice President of Character Development at the John Templeton Foundation.

Hill briefly served as Acting Administrator of the U.S. Agency for International Development (USAID) in January 2009.

Hill was the Assistant Administrator for the Bureau for Global Health from 2005 until 2009, before which he was Assistant Administrator for the Bureau for Europe and Eurasia at USAID. As the latter, he oversaw economic and humanitarian assistance in 23 nations from the Balkans to Central Asia, including all the countries of the former Soviet Union." As described by USAID, Hill is "responsible for a bureau that manages health programs all over the world" with funding in the range of billions of dollars and "seeks to provide global leadership in the effort to improve the quality, availability, and use of essential health services."

As well as political roles, Hill has published books, articles, reviews on human rights, intellectual history, international development, and matters related to religion in the former Soviet Union.

He is a noted expert on democracy, international development policy, human rights, and international religious freedom issues.

He has also been an active participant in religious dialogue. Hill was president of Eastern Nazarene College (ENC) from 1992 to 2001, where he instituted a somewhat controversial but ACLU-approved policy for the college to only hire "committed Christians", and was highly active in ecumenical relations between the evangelical-Protestant Nazarenes and Roman Catholics.

From 1986 to 1992, Hill was president of the Institute on Religion and Democracy in Washington, D.C. He also taught European and Russian history at Seattle Pacific University from 1980 to 1986.

== Education ==
Hill graduated from Northwest Nazarene College in Nampa, Idaho, where he studied under visiting scholar James R. Cameron. Hill also has a master's degree in Russian studies and a Ph.D. in history from the University of Washington in Seattle. He was also awarded an honorary doctor of humane letters from Houghton College.

== Notes and references ==
Academic offices
Preceded by Cecil R. Paul	President of the Eastern Nazarene College; 1992–2001	Succeeded by Albert L. Truesdale, Jr.
