= James R. Cameron =

American historian

James Reese Cameron (born 1929) is an educator and historian.

== Early life and education ==
An Ohio native, Cameron began his undergraduate education at the Ohio State University. He transferred to the Eastern Nazarene College and received his bachelor's degree in history. He received his master's degree and doctoral degree from Boston University, in 1952 and 1959, respectively.

== Career ==
Cameron began teaching at Eastern Nazarene Academy in 1951, soon after his graduation from the Eastern Nazarene College. He started teaching at the college in 1954, and the academy closed after 1955. He became chair of the history department there in 1959 after the departure of Charles W. Akers. He also directed the intercollegiate debate program at Eastern Nazarene, which went to the National Debate Tournament in 1961 and 1962 (won by Harvard University and the Ohio State University, respectively), and was visiting professor of history at Northwest Nazarene College starting in 1968. In 2002, he retired and was made professor emeritus of history at ENC. He has been an officer in the Quincy Historical Society, a member of the New England Forensic Association and a Danforth Associate, and a charter member of the Conference on Faith and History at Huntington University in Indiana. He is also a member of the New England Historical Association, and a Pilgrim Society fellow, and continues to teach at Eastern Nazarene.

== Published works ==
Cameron is the author of several books:

- Frederic William Maitland and the History of English Law, University of Oklahoma Press (1961), Greenwood Press (1977), Lawbook Exchange (2001)
- The public service of Josiah Quincy, Jr., 1802-1882, Quincy Cooperative Bank (1964)
- New Beginnings: Quincy and Norfolk County, Massachusetts, Quincy Historical Society (1966)
- Eastern Nazarene College—The First Fifty Years, 1900-1950, Nazarene Publishing House (1968)
- Church on the Campus: History of Wollaston Church of the Nazarene, Nazarene Publishing House (1972)
- Calendar of the papers of General Joseph Palmer, 1716-1788, Quincy Historical Society (1978)
- The Spirit Makes the Difference: The History of Eastern Nazarene College, Part II, 1950-2000, ENC Press (2000)

== Legacy ==
The James R. Cameron Center for History, Law, & Government at the Eastern Nazarene College was dedicated in 2005 in Dr. Cameron's honor.
