= J. E. L. Moore =

American academic administrator and minister

John Edgar Littleton Moore (born 5 September 1883 at Lewisport, Kentucky; died 26 January 1935 in Indianapolis, Indiana) was an ordained minister in the Methodist Episcopal Church and later the Church of the Nazarene, who served as president of the Central Nazarene College (1911–1918), the Eastern Nazarene College (1918–1919), and Olivet University (1919–1922). Converted in July 1904, he received his education at Kentucky State University and Asbury College (graduating from the latter in 1907), then did graduate work for a master's degree at Boston University while principal of the Pentecostal Collegiate Institute. He was also an evangelist and served on the General Board of Foreign Missions for the Church of the Nazarene.

== Notes and references ==
Academic offices
Preceded by New position	President of the Eastern Nazarene College; 1918–1919	Succeeded by Fred J. Shields
