= Bresee =

Bresee is a surname. Notable people with the surname include:

- Bryan Bresee (born 2001), American football player
- Frank Bresee (1929–2018), American radio actor, radio historian, and board game designer
- John Bresee (1966–2019), American entrepreneur, writer, editor, and entrepreneur coach
- Phineas F. Bresee (1838–1915), American religious leader and educator
- Rebecca Wilson Bresee, American computer animator
- Ric Bresee, Canadian politician

== See also ==
- Bresee Hall
