= Ralph Earle Jr. =

American biblical scholar

- Born: January 17, 1908; Dighton, Massachusetts, USA
- Died: May 23, 1995 (aged 87)

Academic background
- Education: Eastern Nazarene College (BA); Boston University (MA); Gordon Divinity School (BDiv, ThD)

Academic work
- Discipline: Theology

Ralph Earle Jr. (January 17, 1908 – May 23, 1995) was an American biblical scholar.

== Early life and education ==
He was born in Dighton, Massachusetts. Earle completed his undergraduate work and earned a Bachelor of Arts from Eastern Nazarene College before earning his Master's degree from Boston University. He completed B.D. and Th.D. programs at Gordon Divinity School before pursuing postdoctoral studies at Edinburgh University in Scotland, Episcopal Theological School, and Harvard University. He also held an honorary D.D. from Eastern Nazarene.

== Career ==
He authored and edited many scholarly articles and books, including several Bible commentaries. He served as a pastor in Woonsocket, Rhode Island and Everett, Massachusetts while on faculty at alma mater Eastern Nazarene College in Quincy, Massachusetts, from 1933 to 1945. He was an ordained minister in the Church of the Nazarene.

Earle was founding Professor of New Testament at Nazarene Theological Seminary in Kansas City, Missouri from 1945 to 1977 and served on the Committee on Bible Translation for the New International Version of the Bible. Earle joined the Evangelical Theological Society as a charter member in 1950, served on the executive committee from 1958 to 1966, and was president in 1962.

== Death ==
Earle died on May 23, 1995, eleven days after suffering a stroke.

== Works ==
- How We Got Our Bible
- Word Meanings in the New Testament
- Beacon Bible Commentary (New Testament editor)
- Wesleyan Bible Commentary (New Testament editor)
- Adam Clarke's Commentary, One-Volume Edition (editor/abridger)
- Expositor's Bible Commentary (contributor)
