= Esther R. Sanger =

American philanthropist (1926–1995)

- Born: Esther R. Hicks; November 29, 1925
- Died: August 1, 1995 (aged 69); Weymouth, Massachusetts
- Education: Eastern Nazarene College
- Known for: Social work, Community activism

Esther R. Sanger (1926–1995) was the founder of two nonprofit organizations: the Quincy Crisis Center, based in Quincy, Massachusetts, and the Mary–Martha Learning Center in Hingham, Massachusetts. After her death, the organization that runs both centers was named the Esther R. Sanger Center for Compassion. She was known locally as the "Mother Teresa of the South Shore".

== Biography ==
Sanger was born Esther Hicks, November 29, 1925 and raised in foster homes. In 2025 her family was in possession of a birth certificate owned by Esther that stated her birth year was 1923. But, it also showed that Esther crossed out 1923 and wrote in red ink 1925. As a teen she happened to meet Bertha Munro, the dean of Eastern Nazarene College, who arranged for her to attend ENC's academy. She earned a literature degree at ENC and later trained as a nurse at St. Vincent's Hospital in Bridgeport, Connecticut. She married and raised three children while working part-time as a nurse and as a columnist for the Quincy Register.

Since her college days, Sanger had felt called to missionary service. She was in her fifties when she became extremely ill and nearly died. The experience motivated her to change her life; as she put it, "to hang onto the real and let go of the phony." She returned to ENC and earned a B.A. in social work in 1979, and an M.A. in family counseling in 1982.

Soon after earning her B.A., she started a simple hotline by posting handwritten flyers on telephone poles and in subways and laundromats, which read, "Do you have problems? I'll be glad to help," followed by her home phone number. She walked the streets and personally handed out the flyers to homeless people. Many of the requests she received were for food, so she began serving hot meals out of her family camper van. As demand increased during the Reagan years due to cuts in Aid to Families with Dependent Children, she asked Quincy officials to help her feed the homeless, and was told, "There are no homeless people in Quincy." To raise their awareness, she began parking her van in front of City Hall where officials could look out their office windows and see her serving long queues of homeless people. Eventually the food service moved to the basement of the United First Parish Church in Quincy Center. Over the years, with donations from local churches, businesses, and residents, tens of thousands of hot meals have been served.

Sanger next started a food pantry to deliver groceries to the elderly, and a program to provide them with transportation for shopping and medical care. She raised funds to purchase a 30-foot mobile home which she had fitted with bunks to give street people a place to keep warm.

In 1990 she was featured in Grow, a national publication of the Church of the Nazarene. The article begins:

In the Boston area south-shore communities, a dynamite little woman named Esther Sanger, 65, continually looks for ways to serve throw-away people like the homeless, hungry, alcoholics, drug users, AIDS victims, battered women, elderly poor, and deserted mothers with babies. Her unique compassionate ministry is called Quincy Crisis Center...Esther Sanger serves as the founder, spark plug, fund raiser, chief cook, legal advocate, crafty strategist, and Christian example in these crisis-intervention efforts.

In an interview she said she considered herself pro-life, but found it troubling that in the anti-abortion movement there was "a great deal of interest in the unborn child but very few places to help out after the baby is born." With that in mind, she opened the Mary–Martha Learning Center in Hingham, Massachusetts, which provided housing, counseling, and other services to homeless women with children.

She began studying for ordination, and served as assistant pastor of Dorchester Second Church, an inner-city church which is now a Church of the Nazarene. The position afforded her the opportunity to preach in area churches of various denominations. Her ministry became so well known that the Patriot Ledger called her the Mother Teresa of the South Shore. She was ordained an elder in the Church of the Nazarene in 1994.

Sanger died of cancer on August 1, 1995. She was survived by her son and two daughters. The Sanger Center celebrated its 25th anniversary in 2006.
