= R. Wayne Gardner =

Robert Wayne Gardner (1894–?) was a minister, an academic, and the president of the Eastern Nazarene College.

== Early life and education ==
Gardner was born in Tidioute, Pennsylvania, on May 16, 1894. He earned his bachelor's degree from Olivet College and was ordained in the Church of the Nazarene in 1918. Upon moving to Eastern Nazarene in Quincy, he started his master's degree from Boston University, which he finished in 1924. He was awarded an honorary doctorate by alma mater Olivet College in 1934.

== Career and legacy ==
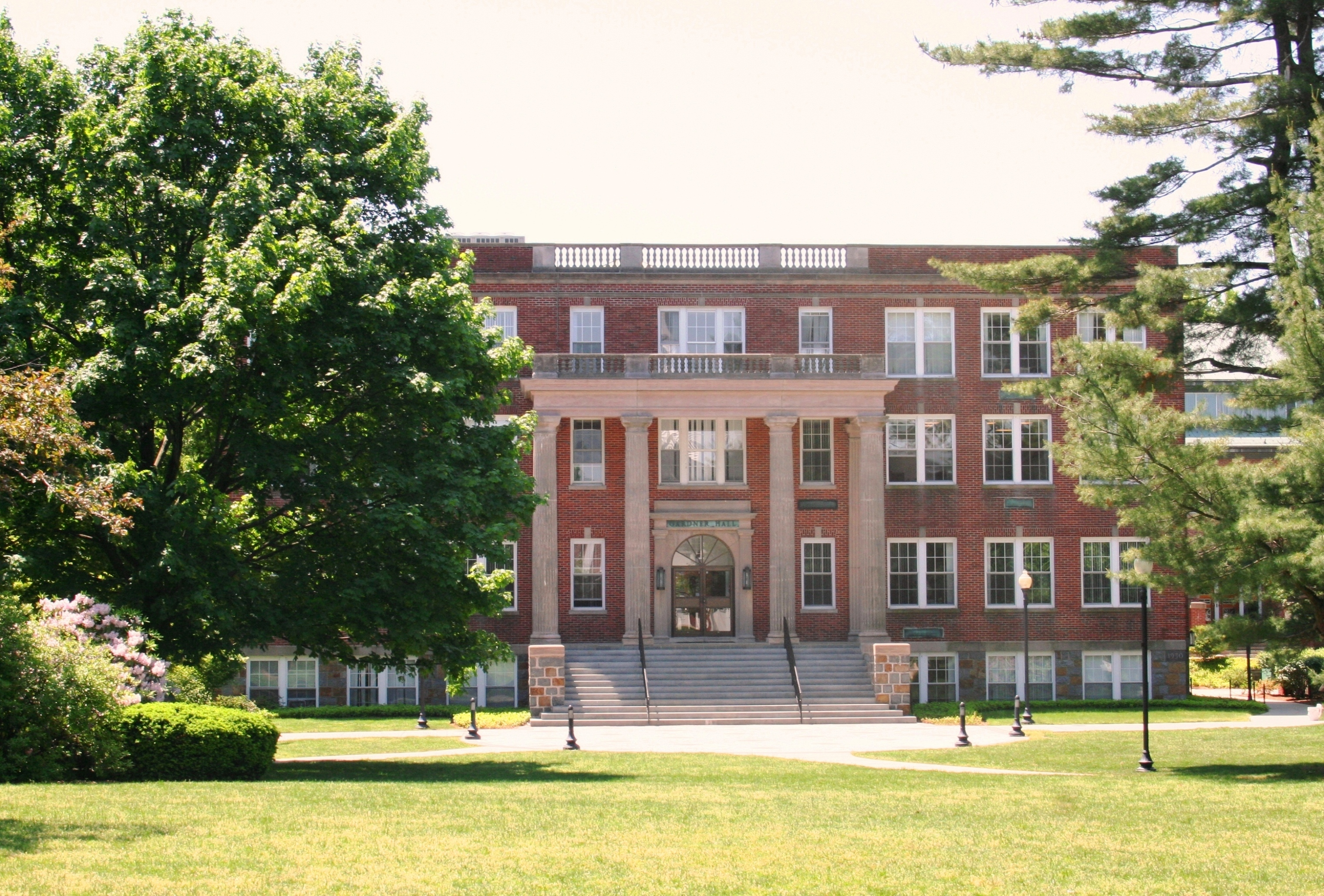
Gardner Hall at the Eastern Nazarene College in Massachusetts

Gardner went to Quincy, Massachusetts, to become the principal of the Eastern Nazarene Academy and began teaching at the Eastern Nazarene College in 1920. During his time there, he became the college registrar and, upon the death of Floyd W. Nease, became president of the college. He resigned in 1936 after collapsing from the strain of operating the college during the Great Depression. He eventually earned a doctorate. In 1951, Gardner joined the faculty of alma mater Olivet Nazarene College.

There is today an "R. Wayne Gardner Memorial Scholarship in Mathematics" at Point Loma Nazarene University and a "Dr. R. Wayne and Elizabeth Young Gardner Scholarship" for ministerial and mathematics students at the Eastern Nazarene College. In addition, the Fowler Memorial Administration Building at Eastern Nazarene was renamed "Gardner Hall" in his honor.

== Notes and references ==
Academic offices
Preceded by Floyd W. Nease	President of the Eastern Nazarene College; 1930–1936	Succeeded by Gideon B. Williamson
