= Cecil R. Paul =

Cecil Roland Paul (1935–1992) was a minister, educator, community leader, and academic. He died at Brigham and Women's Hospital in Boston after suffering a brain hemorrhage. He was the second president of the Eastern Nazarene College to die in office. The Cecil R. Paul Center for Business, part of the Adams Executive Center on the Old Colony Campus of Eastern Nazarene, is named in his honor.

== Early life and education ==
A Canadian by birth, Paul was born in rural Alberta, in a log cabin with no running water. He would later attend Canadian Nazarene College in Red Deer, Alberta and pursue graduate study at Nazarene Theological Seminary in Kansas City, Missouri before earning a doctoral degree in psychology and pastoral counseling from Boston University.

== Career and ministry ==
An ordained minister in the Church of the Nazarene, Paul joined the faculty of the Eastern Nazarene College in 1963, and has been credited with developing the school's psychology program. He also founded the college's division of adult and graduate studies in 1981, increasing total enrollment by nearly 50 percent. He then served from 1989 to 1992 as president of the college. Paul also founded the Beechwood Community Life Center, also in Wollaston, Massachusetts, and was a co-founder of the Senior Olympics.

== Notes and references ==
Academic offices
Preceded by Stephen W. Nease	President of the Eastern Nazarene College; 1989–1992	Succeeded by Kent R. Hill
