= Donna Fletcher Crow =

American writer (born 1941)

- Born: 1941; Nampa, Idaho
- Occupation: Mystery Writer

Donna Fletcher Crow (born 1941) is an American mystery writer known for historical Christian fiction. She lives in Boise, Idaho, but sets much of her work in England.

== Biography ==
Crow was born in Nampa, Idaho in 1941. She was an only child and grew up learning to ride horses. Crow participated in competitive riding, winning the titles of Snake River Stampede Rodeo Queen in 1959 and Miss Rodeo Idaho in 1960, and she was a runner up in the Miss Rodeo America 1960 competition. Crow graduated from Northwest Nazarene College with a bachelor's in English literature in 1964 and afterwards, she taught English and drama in high school.

Crow founded an alternative Wesleyan-Anglican church called Epworth Chapel on the Green.

== Work ==
Crow promoted her nonfiction book, Recipes for the Protein Diet in 1972. A reviewer for the Idaho Free Press felt that there was good variety among the recipes and the pictures were realistic and "mouth-watering."

Crow's novel, Glastonbury: The Novel of Christian England, won the best historical novel of 1992 from the National Federation of Press Women. Her work has been compared to Veronica Black and Carol Anne O'Marie by Library Journal.

== Bibliography ==
=== The Celtic Cross ===
- The Keeper of the Stone: Of Saints and Chieftains (2021)
- The Forger of a Nation: Of Kings and Kingdoms (2021)
- The Refiner of the Realm: Of Queens and Clerics (2021)
- The Vanquishers of Tyranny: Of Priests and Patriots (2021)
- The Planting of Ulster: Of Visionaries and Builders (2021)
- The Hammering of the Inhabitancy: Of Brothers and Strangers (2021)
- The Strife of Ascendancy: Of People and Rulers (2022)
- The Shaping of the Union: Of Plots and Parliaments (2022)
- The Famishment of the People: Of Hunger and Fulfillment (2022)
- The Dawning of Peace: Of Dreamers and Designers (2022)

=== The Monastery Murders ===
- A Very Private Grave. Monarch Books. 2010. ISBN 9781854249685.
- A Darkly Hidden Truth. Monarch Books. 2011. ISBN 9780857210500.
- An Unholy Communion. Lion Fiction. 2013. ISBN 9781782640042.
- A Newly Crimsoned Reliquary (2014)
- An All-Consuming Fire (2015)
- Against All Fierce Hostility (2020)

=== The Elizabeth and Richard Mysteries ===
- The Flame Ignites (2015)
- Shadow of Reality (1992) (reissued as The Shadow of Reality, 2018)
- A Midsummer Eve's Nightmare (2012)
- A Jane Austen Encounter (2013)
- A Most Singular Venture (2016)

=== Lord Danvers Mysteries ===
- A Most Inconvenient Death. Moody Press. 1993. ISBN 9780802427106.
- Grave Matters. Moody Press. 1994. ISBN 9780802427113.
- To Dust You Shall Return (1995)
- A Tincture of Murder (2012)
- A Lethal Spectre (2018)

=== Epic Novels ===
- Glastonbury: The Novel of Christian England (1992) (new ed. 2013)
- Glastonbury: A Novel of the Holy Grail (ebook) (2012)
- The Fields of Bannockburn: A Novel of Scotland from Origins to Independence (1996)
- The Banks of the Boyne: The Generations of Northern Ireland (1998)

=== The Virtuous Heart Series ===
- All Things New. Beacon Hill Press. 1997. ISBN 9780834116740.
- Roses in Autumn. Beacon Hill Press. 1998. ISBN 9780834117136.

=== The Daughters of Courage ===
- Kathryn. Moody Press. 1992. ISBN 9780802445278.
- Elizabeth. Moody Press. 1993. ISBN 9780802445285.
- Stephanie. Moody Press. 1993. ISBN 9780802445292.

=== The Cambridge Chronicles ===
- A Gentle Calling (1994)
- Treasures of the Heart. Crossway Books. 1994. ISBN 9780891078074.
- Where Love Begins (1994)
- To Be Worthy (1994)
- Encounter the Light. Crossway Books. 1997. ISBN 9780891078760.
- Where Love Calls. Crossway Books. 1998. ISBN 9780891079989.

=== Intrigue ===
- The Castle of Dreams (1992)

=== Serenade Romances ===
- Love Unmerited (1986)
- The Desires of Your Heart (1985)
- Greengold Autumn (1984)

=== Choose Your Own Adventure ===
- General Kempthorne's Victory Tour (1987)
- The Evil Plot of Dr. Zarnof (1983)
- Mr. Xanthu's Golden Scheme (1985)
- Professor Q's Mysterious Machine (1983)

=== Nonfiction ===
- Seasons of Prayer: Discovering the Riches of the Church Year Through Classic Prayer (2000)
- The Frantic Mother Cookbook (1982)
- Recipes for the Protein Diet (1972)
