= Ann Kiemel Anderson =

American religious speaker (1945–2014)

- Born: September 22, 1945; Little Rock, Arkansas, U.S.
- Died: March 1, 2014 (aged 68)
- Other names: Ann Kiemel
- Occupation(s): Religious speaker and author

Ann Kiemel Anderson (September 22, 1945 – March 1, 2014) was an American religious speaker and author. Her books were bestsellers and all of her books together sold over 28 million copies. A 1980 film titled Hi, I'm Ann was based on her life.

== Career ==
After graduating from Northwest Nazarene University, Anderson moved to Kansas City to teach and she drove a bus full of people to church every Sunday. She moved to Long Beach, California, to work as a youth director and her youth groups met during weekdays. When she was 25 years old, Anderson became the dean of women at the Eastern Nazarene College in Boston, and said that her trust of God helped her in that position. She said that she never tried to gain these roles, but that she was asked to take them. The Petoskey News-Review said that Anderson was "one of America's most sought after inspirational speakers". She became a marathon runner to share her message of Christianity, including participating in two Boston Marathons and two Israel marathons near the Sea of Galilee. Her speeches influenced many of the athletes that she met. Anderson helped construct a gymnasium for children in Boston.

I Love the Word Impossible and I'm Out to Change My World are among Anderson's 18 books, with all of her books collectively selling over 28 million copies. Her first seven books were bestsellers in the inspirational genre. The book Taste of Tears, Touch of God is an autobiography that focuses on Anderson's life as a wife and her miscarriages. Seduced by Success: No Longer Addicted to Pills, Performance, and Praise details her time in a chemical dependency wing and how her faith in God helped her overcome that period. Anderson's face being part of a magazine or her being part of a book deal was thought by editors and publishers to guarantee a large profit. A film about Anderson's life titled Hi, I'm Ann was released in 1980. The film was released on VHS.

== Personal life ==
Anderson was born on September 22, 1945, to missionary parents in Little Rock, Arkansas. She had a twin sister and a brother. They spent their childhood in Hawaii, with Anderson and her twin later attending Northwest Nazarene University. Anderson preached about God and love during her travels, often traveling by airplane. In 1981, she married Will Anderson and they lived in Idaho, later moving to Chicago, Illinois. She spent 25 days in the Cedar Vista Hospital's chemical dependency wing in 1996 due to her painkiller addiction which was caused by her medical issues and her husband dying from cancer. Anderson had trouble sleeping, had a kidney infection, and cried during therapy. She said she was able to overcome her struggles through trusting in God and not paying attention to the opinions of others. Anderson died on March 1, 2014, from cancer.

== Works ==
Anderson wrote 17 books during her lifetime:

- Hi! I'm Ann, 1974
- I'm Out to Change My World, 1974
- I Love the Word Impossible, 1976
- It's Incredible!, 1977
- Yes, 1978
- I'm Celebrating, 1979
- I'm Running to Win, 1980
- I Gave God Time, 1982
- Taste of Tears, Touch of God, 1984
- Struggling for Wholeness, 1986 – co-authored with her sister
- Ann Keimel Anderson: My Favorite Verse, 1986
- And With the Gift Came Laughter, 1987
- God's Little Dreamer, 1990
- Our Adoption: My Story of Love and Laughter, 1990
- First Love, 1991
- Seduced by Success, 1998
- This Is My Story About God: The True Account of Two Men, An Impossible Surgery, and the God of the Universe, 1998
