= Fred J. Shields =

American minister, academic and educator

Frederick James Shields was a minister, educator, and president of the Eastern Nazarene College.

== Education ==
Shields earned his bachelor's degree from Nazarene University in 1915 and master's degrees from the University of Southern California and Harvard University. He also attended the University of California and the University of Chicago.

== Career and ministry ==
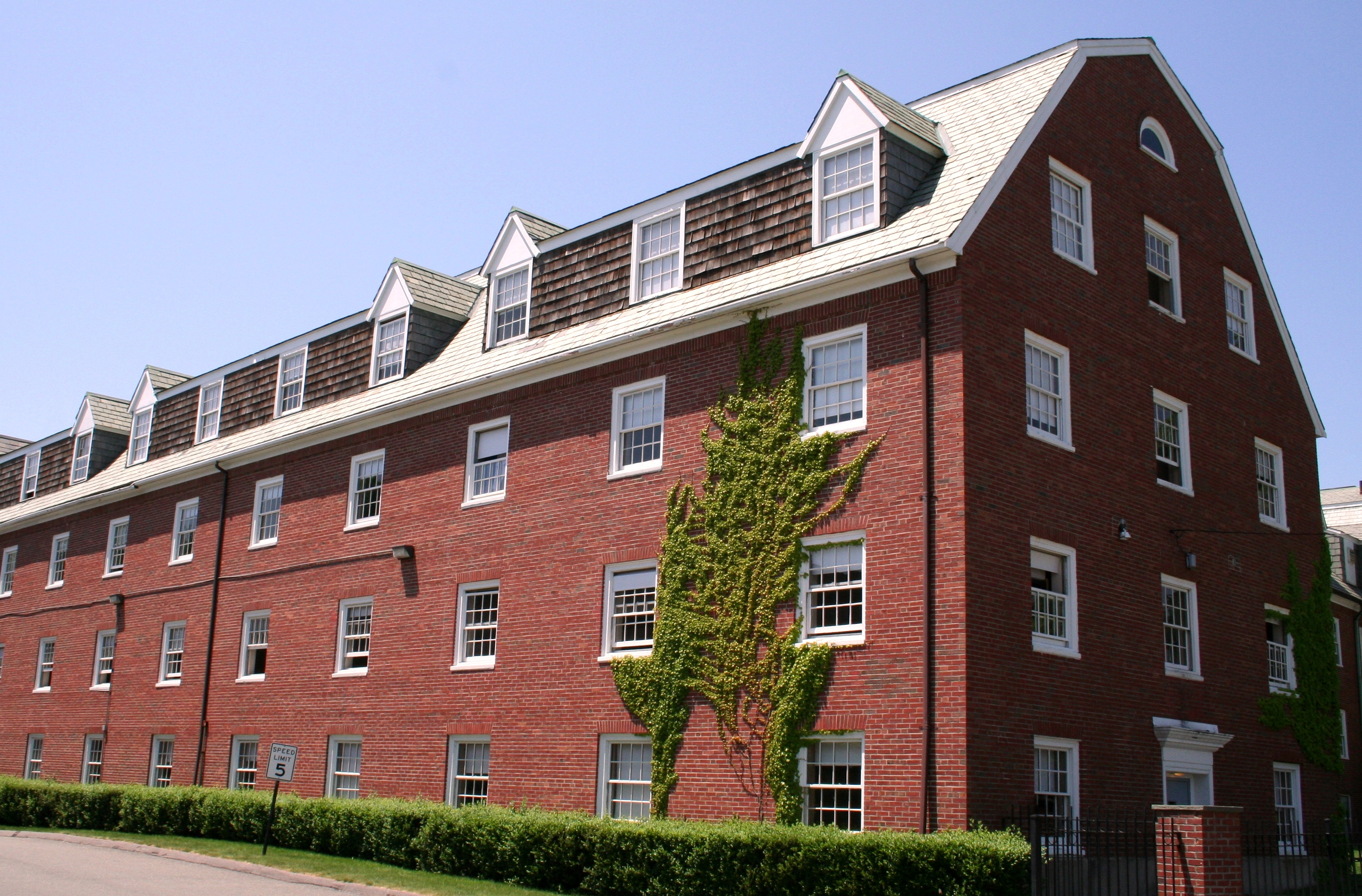
Shields Hall on the main campus of the Eastern Nazarene College in Massachusetts

After earning his master's degree from the University of Southern California, Shields went to Northwest Nazarene College in Nampa, Idaho. He was acting as president of the college there when he left for North Scituate, Rhode Island to replace President J.E.L. Moore at the Eastern Nazarene College on the advice of John W. Goodwin. When the college moved to Wollaston, Massachusetts, in Quincy, in 1919, Shields moved with the school. He was president of the college from 1919 to 1923. During that time, he attended Harvard Graduate School of Education. After relinquishing the presidency at Eastern Nazarene, Shields taught at Connecticut Women's College in New London, Connecticut before returning to his alma mater, Pasadena College, to teach education and psychology, where he was awarded an honorary doctor of divinity in 1935. In 1935, after receiving his honorary doctorate from Pasadena, he returned to Eastern Nazarene to teach. Shields took the pastorate at Bethany Nazarene Church in Rumford, Rhode Island in 1941, after his return to Eastern Nazarene in 1935.

== Legacy ==
Shields Hall, a residence hall for male freshman, on the campus of Eastern Nazarene College is named in honor of Fred Shields. The first edition of the student yearbook at Eastern Nazarene, The Nautilus, was also dedicated to President Shields in 1922.

== Notes and references ==
Academic offices
Preceded by J. E. L. Moore	President of the Eastern Nazarene College; 1919–1923	Succeeded by Floyd W. Nease
