= Stephen W. Nease =

Stephen Wesley Nease (January 15, 1925 – April 6, 2006) was an educator and president of four different institutions of higher education. He was the father of two daughters, Linda Scott and Melissa Wallace; four sons, Floyd Nease (Representative to the Vermont State House and Majority Leader), Stephen Nease, Jr. (CTO Library of Congress), David Hardy Nease (who died at the age of 9), and David Wayne Nease.

== Early life and education ==
Stephen W. Nease was born January 15, 1925, in Quincy, Massachusetts, to Madeline Nostrand and Floyd W. Nease while his father was president of Eastern Nazarene College. He earned his AB from Brown University and his ThB from Eastern Nazarene College in 1951. He later completed graduate work at Harvard Divinity School, and ENC awarded him an honorary Doctor of Divinity in 1966.

== Career ==
Stephen W. Nease served as dean of men at Eastern Nazarene College in 1950. He became the executive field secretary in 1952, and was director of development in 1958. He then served as the founding president of Mount Vernon Nazarene College from 1966 to 1972, when he became the president of Bethany Nazarene College. He left the presidency at Bethany to take on the presidency of Nazarene Theological Seminary in 1976. In 1981, he left to become the president of his alma mater, Eastern Nazarene College.

In 1989, Nease was elected by the Church of the Nazarene to serve as the first Commissioner of Education. He held this position until retirement in 1994. In retirement, he served in the development office at Mount Vernon Nazarene until 2000.

== Notes and references ==
Academic offices
Preceded by Donald Irwin	President of the Eastern Nazarene College; 1981–1989	Succeeded by Cecil R. Paul
