= Gideon B. Williamson =

Nazarene General Superintendents

Gideon Williamson

President of Eastern Nazarene College
- In office 1936–1944
- Preceded by: R. Wayne Gardner
- Succeeded by: Samuel Young

Personal details
- Born: February 20, 1898 New Florence, Missouri, U.S.
- Died: 1981
- Education: John Fletcher College; McCormick Theological Seminary; Northern Baptist Seminary
- Profession: Minister, educator

Gideon Williamson (1898–1981) was a minister, president of Eastern Nazarene College (1936–1944), general president of the Nazarene Young People's Society (1932–1940), and general superintendent in the Church of the Nazarene (1946–1968).

He was born February 20, 1898, in New Florence, Missouri, converted and called to preach at an early age in the Church of God (Holiness), and joined the Church of the Nazarene in 1919 when he graduated from John Fletcher College at University Park, Iowa. He pursued further studies at McCormick and Northern Baptist Seminary in Chicago, Illinois. He pastored for 16 years, at the Austin Church in Chicago, the Cleveland First Church of the Nazarene in Ohio, and, after he left the presidency at Eastern Nazarene in Massachusetts, the First Church of the Nazarene in Kansas City, Missouri.

== Notes and references ==
Academic offices
Preceded by R. Wayne Gardner	President of the Eastern Nazarene College; 1936–1944	Succeeded by Samuel Young
