= A. Gordon Wetmore =

American theologian

President of Northwest Nazarene College
- In office 1983–1992

Personal details
- Born: Arnold Gordon Wetmore; June 24, 1931 New Brunswick, Canada
- Died: June 9, 2016 (aged 84) Olathe, Kansas, U.S.
- Education: Eastern Nazarene College; Fuller Theological Seminary (D.Min.)

Arnold Gordon Wetmore was an American theologian who was president emeritus of the Nazarene Theological Seminary and a former president of the Northwest Nazarene College.

== Early life and education ==
Wetmore was born on June 24, 1931, in New Brunswick, Canada. Wetmore received his undergraduate degree at the Eastern Nazarene College in Massachusetts. He then earned a doctor of ministry degree from Fuller Theological Seminary. He has also received two honorary degrees.

== Career and ministry ==
Wetmore pastored churches in Quincy, Massachusetts, Kansas City, Missouri, Columbus, Ohio, and Monroe, Wisconsin, in addition to serving as dean of students at his alma mater, Eastern Nazarene College. In 1983, Wetmore was elected president of the Northwest Nazarene College and served there until 1992, when he was elected president of the Nazarene Theological Seminary. He retired in 2000 and lived with his wife in Olathe, Kansas, until his death on June 9, 2016.
