= Quincy College =

Community college in Massachusetts, US

- Seal of Quincy College
- Former names: College Courses, Inc. (1956–1958), Quincy Junior College (1958–1990)
- Motto: Let's get to work
- Type: Public community college
- Established: 1958
- Accreditation: NECHE
- President: Richard DeCristofaro
- Students: 2,602 (fall 2022)
- Location: Quincy, Massachusetts, United States; 42.253005°N 71.003177°W
- Campus: Suburban
- Mascot: Granite
- Website: quincycollege.edu

Quincy College (QC) is a public community college in Quincy, Massachusetts. It is an open admission school that offers associate degrees, bachelor degrees, and certificate programs. It was founded in 1958 and enrolls approximately 3,500 students at campuses in Quincy and Plymouth, Massachusetts.

== History ==
During the mid-1950s, demand for higher education on the South Shore, and Quincy in particular, led to the creation of the Citizen's Committee appointed to study the feasibility of establishing a community college. This committee recommended that a community college should exist and as early as 1956, the first college-level courses were offered.

The school's first classes were offered at the Coddington Elementary School in 1956 as College Courses, Inc., after a committee was created to establish a new community college and Timothy L. Smith, historian and professor at the Eastern Nazarene College (ENC), was named its first director. It was sponsored by the Quincy School Department and used faculty from Eastern Nazarene. Another ENC history professor, Charles W. Akers, became its first full-time director and transformed it into a junior college in 1958, naming it Quincy Junior College (QJC) when it was first given power to grant associate's degrees in the Commonwealth of Massachusetts.

In May 1958, College Courses, Inc., a non-profit charitable organization, was formed to help further higher education on the South Shore. In the fall of that same year, the first freshman class began at what would later be known as Quincy College.

Less than five years later, Quincy College was empowered to award the Associate in Arts and the Associate in Science degrees. Quincy College is accredited by the New England Commission of Higher Education.

Quincy College is one of the last municipally owned colleges in the USA. In 1991, the school founded the Plymouth campus located thirty minutes south of Quincy in downtown Plymouth, Massachusetts.

=== Bachelor of Science degree ===
In January 2022, Quincy College began offering bachelor of science degrees in Business Management, Psychology, and Computer Science. Quincy College is the only traditional two-year Massachusetts college to offer a four-year degree. Enrolling in Quincy College does not require using the Common App but rather its own online application. Financial aid and scholarships are also available.

=== Nursing program closure and reopening ===
The Massachusetts Board of Registration in Nursing withdrew its approval of the college's nursing program on May 9, 2018. The percentage of Quincy college graduates who passed licensure exams on their first try in 2017 was just 54%; this was down from 59% in 2016 and 72% in 2015. Shortly afterward, Quincy College President Peter Tsaffaras offered his resignation and said he had lost the confidence of the college's board of governors.

In response to the withdrawn approval, the college invested in training labs, simulated hospital rooms, and a synthetic cadaver. On March 13, 2019, less than one year after withdrawing its approval, the Board of Registration in Nursing voted to allow reopening of a refreshed and updated nursing program on the Quincy and Plymouth Campuses. Since reopening, the percentage of students passing their first attempt at licensure exams increased to 91% in 2023.

=== Presidents ===
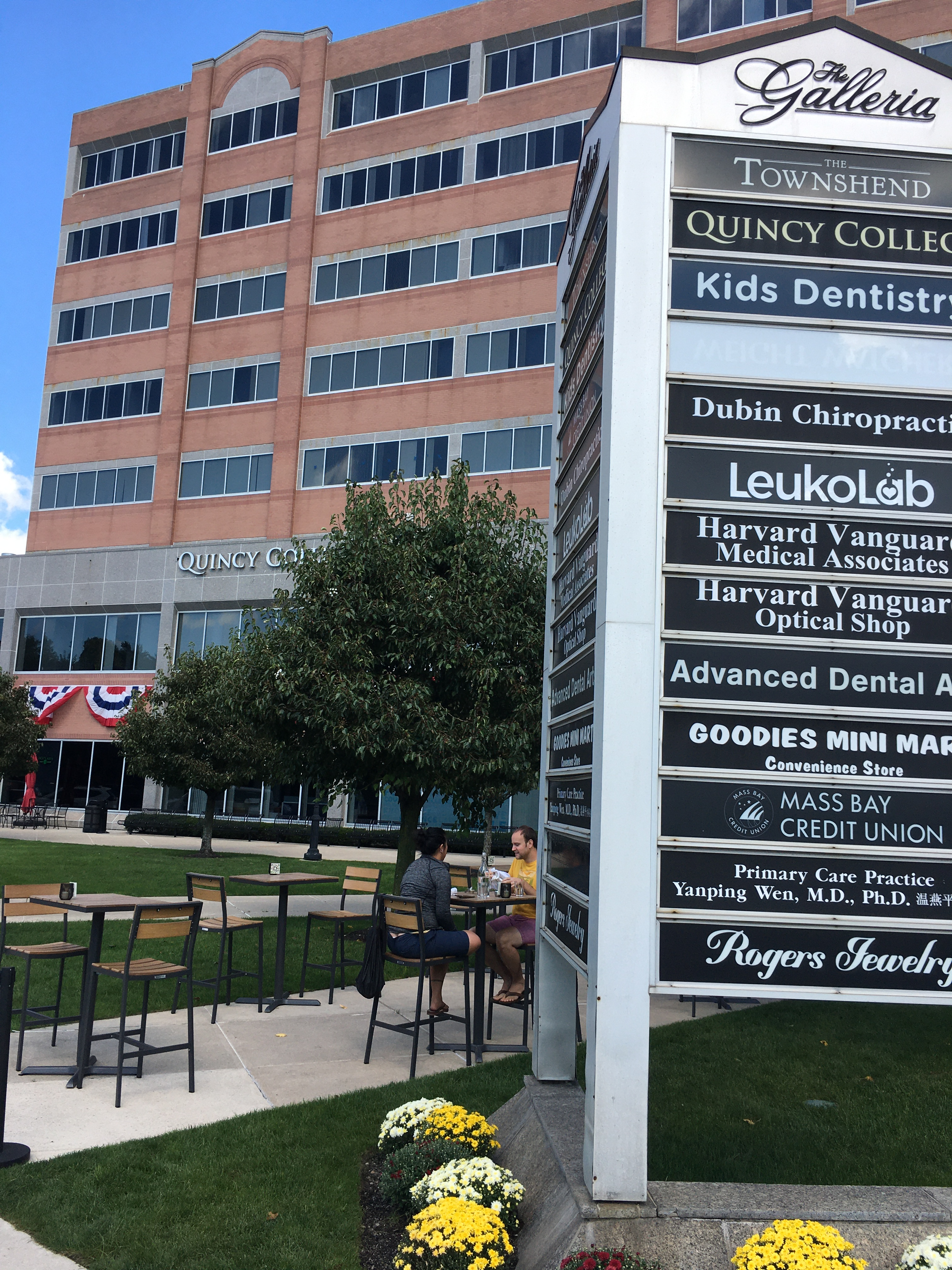
The main Quincy College building, within the Presidents Place complex in downtown Quincy

Presidents
1.	Kenneth P. White	1961–1971
2.	Edward F. Pierce	1972–1982
3.	O. Clayton Johnson	1983–1993
4.	G. Jeremiah Ryan	1996–1999
5.	Sean L. Barry	2000–2005
6.	Martha Sue Harris	2005–2010
7.	Peter Tsaffaras	2011–2018
8.	Michael G. Bellotti	2018–2019
9.	Daniel M. Asquino	2019–2020
10.	Richard DeCristofaro	2020–Present

== Academics ==
The college offers 3 bachelor's degree programs, 35 associate degree programs, and 21 certificate programs. It is accredited by the New England Commission of Higher Education (NECHE). The school is an open enrollment institution, meaning that it accepts all students with a high school diploma or equivalent to matriculate, regardless of academic abilities, without selectivity. As of 2024, there were 4,863 students enrolled.

== Campus ==
The main campus is in Quincy Center located at 1250 Hancock St, President's Place, Quincy. Saville Hall, which is also part of Quincy College, is located at 24 Saville Ave., also in Quincy. There is also another satellite campus in Plymouth, Massachusetts, located at 36 Cordage Park Circle. The school does not have residential facilities, as it is a commuter school.

== Organization ==
Quincy College operates under the auspices of the City of Quincy. The college is unusual in this respect, as it is the only one of Massachusetts' 16 community colleges to be run by a city, rather than the Commonwealth of Massachusetts. It is one of only two colleges in the United States organized this way. Until the 1990s, it was run by the Quincy School Committee, but now has its own governing board.

== Notable alumni ==
- Bruce Ayers, member of the Massachusetts House of Representatives since 1998.
- William G. Gross, Boston Police Commissioner.
- Frances A. Karnes, educator, academic, and writer
