= Russell V. DeLong =

Russell Victor DeLong (1901–1981) was a Nazarene minister, evangelist, and college president.

== Early life and education ==
DeLong was a New Hampshire native, the son of a minister. He received his undergraduate education at the Eastern Nazarene College in Massachusetts, then earned his master's and doctoral degrees from Boston University. He later received an honorary doctor of divinity from the Northwest Nazarene College.

== Academic career and ministry ==
DeLong was ordained in 1926 and came on faculty at the Northwest Nazarene College (NNC) that same year. He was elected president of NNC in 1927 and served until 1932, when he left to complete his doctoral work at Boston University, but was elected to the presidency at NNC a second time in 1935 and served there again until 1942. It was under his first administration that NNC gained educational accreditation as a two-year school, and under his second that the college gained accreditation as a four-year school.

He then served as District Superintendent for the Northwest Indiana District Church of the Nazarene until 1945, when he was elected founding dean of Nazarene Theological Seminary (NTS) in Kansas City, Missouri. While at NTS in the 1950s, he operated a successful radio ministry. He also was the author, compiler, or editor of at least 33 books. DeLong later served as president of Pasadena College, from 1957 to 1960.
