= Rebecca Wilson Bresee =

American animator

- Born: Miami, FL
- Other name: Becky Bresee
- Education: SUNY Geneseo
- Occupation: Computer Animator
- Employer: Disney
- Known for: Head of Animation for Frozen 2

Rebecca Bresee is a computer animator at Disney. Becky Bresee joined Disney in 1996 and has worked on movies such as Tangled, Wreck-It Ralph, Big Hero Six, Zootopia, Frozen and Frozen 2, and Moana. Bresee is most known for working on Disney's Frozen.

== Work on Frozen ==
Rebecca Bresee worked as supervising animator for Frozen before moving on to become Head of Animation for Frozen II, but is said to have paid special attention to the character Anna in both of her roles working for the films. Frozen II was the first film Bresee was the Head of Animation for, and when asked about the film she responded, "I am nervously excited. Part of it speaks to me very personally. I hold tight to it, because I love it so much, and I hope other people love it, too." In "The Story of Frozen: Making a Disney Animated Classic," Bresee is noted as a supervising animator for Anna, and is said to have based the movements for Anna off of real-life videos she took of herself and her children. This was to give Anna a life-like quality that would appear in the animation. In doing so, the character of Anna was distinctly separate from other characters created for the same movie, creating an 'optimistic' and 'fearless' Anna. Later, for Frozen II, Bresee would become Head of Animation. This gave her additional responsibilities such as overseeing the animation for the movie, working on additional characters, and managing the rest of the animation team.

When asked about Frozen II, Bresee responded with, "It's an evolution and an expansion of the story of Frozen, and many of the questions raised in the first movie become the mysteries that our gang are trying to solve in this film." Bresee worked alongside Tony Smeed as Head of Animation to help recreate the iconic characters of Anna and Elsa. Given that Bresee had been involved heavily with Anna's character in the previous film, she was able to continue this work into the next.

== Biography ==
Rebecca Bresee was born in Miami, Florida, alongside her twin sister. She grew up in Miami, Florida but moved to Oneonta when she was ten years old. She graduated from Oneonta High School, took animation classes at Sheridan College, and graduated from SUNY Geneseo in 1993 before moving on to work at Disney three years later.

She has two daughters and a husband.

== Works ==
- Dinosaur
- Treasure Planet
- Chicken Little
- Meet the Robinsons
- Bolt
- Tangled
- Wreck-It Ralph
- Big Hero 6
- Zootopia
- Frozen
- Frozen II
- Moana
