= Floyd W. Nease =

American minister and administrator

Floyd William Nease (1893–1930) was an American minister and the president of the Eastern Nazarene College until his death in 1930. He is the grandfather of Floyd William Nease II, as well as Linda Nease Scott (a recently retired [8/2020] employee of the college where both her father and grandfather served as president).

== Early life ==
Nease was born in Vassar, Michigan, to Agnes Wotring and William O. Nease, an itinerant preacher. In turn, he was the father of Stephen W. Nease and Helen Munro Bradley. He was also the younger brother of Orval J. Nease.

== Education ==
Nease began his education at Nazarene University in 1913, left for medical reasons, and returned in 1917. He received a Bachelor of Divinity from then-Pasadena University and a Master of Arts at University of Southern California in 1918. When he moved to Quincy, Massachusetts, in 1919, he had completed most of the work for a doctor of bible at the Maclay College of Theology. In 1924, he received the degree of Master of Sacred Theology from Boston University and had finished the work for a PhD at Drew University at the time of his death, with the exception of one-half year's residence. After his death, his wife received a letter of appreciation received from the Dean of the Faculty there, representative of the "high esteem" in which he was held by his associates.

== Career in academia ==
In 1918, he became an ordained minister in the Church of the Nazarene under General Superintendent H. F. Reynolds. In 1919, he came on faculty for the Eastern Nazarene College (ENC) under president Fred J. Shields. He became president himself in 1924 and held office until his death. In 1928, he was made a member of the General Board of Education of the Church of the Nazarene, and was elected chairman in 1929. He was also elected District Superintendent of the New England District of the Church of the Nazarene in May 1929, but resigned within hours because he felt he must carry on the work at Eastern Nazarene.

During his time at ENC, Nease defended his petition to the General Court of the Commonwealth of Massachusetts to give the college degree-granting power in that state. Nease died months later in Pittsburgh, Pennsylvania, at the age of 36, of "acute pancreatitis, with heart failure following an operation." At the time, he was engaged in a campaign to raise money for the college, including the erection of a new administration building, dedicated one month before. He was the first president of Eastern Nazarene to die in office. His wife, Madeline Nostrand Nease, was college registrar for 30 years, from 1930-1960.

== Notes and references ==
Academic offices
Preceded by Fred J. Shields	President of the Eastern Nazarene College; 1924–1930	Succeeded by R. Wayne Gardner
