= Floyd Nease (politician) =

American politician (born 1952)

Floyd William Nease II (born 1952) is the former Democratic Party Majority Leader of the Vermont House of Representatives.

== Early life and education ==
Nease was born August 2, 1952, in Boston, the son of Stephen W. Nease and the grandson of Floyd W. Nease. He attended high school in Mount Vernon, Ohio, and earned an associate's degree from Mount Vernon Nazarene College before attending Eastern Nazarene College in Quincy, Massachusetts, for his baccalaureate education. He later earned a master's degree from Antioch University in 1986.

== Career ==
Nease was the director of Laraway Youth and Family Services and served as a Vermont state representative from 2002 until his resignation in January 2011. He served as the house majority leader for two terms. He represented District 3: Lamoille County, Vermont.
