= John E. Riley =

John Eckel Riley was a Nazarene minister and president of the Northwest Nazarene College (NNC) from 1952 to 1973.

== Early life and education ==
John Riley was born to George Duncan Riley and Mary Jane Oliver Riley on January 23, 1909, in Haverhill, Massachusetts. He received his undergraduate degree from the Eastern Nazarene College in 1930 and his graduate education at Boston University in 1931. He married Dorcas Mine Tarr in 1932. He also received an honorary doctor of divinity from alma mater Eastern Nazarene in 1950.

== Career in ministry and academia ==
Riley was the minister of Nazarene churches in Livermore Falls, Maine, New Haven, Connecticut, South Portland, Maine, and Toronto, Ontario. He was minister of the College Church of the Nazarene in Nampa, Idaho from 1944 to 1952, when he was elected as president of Northwest Nazarene College. While president of NNC from 1952 to 1973, Riley led an ambitious academic program to expand and professionalize the Christian liberal arts college. His Campus Plateau 1970 program added a number of new doctorates to the faculty, helped fund several new buildings, and clearly strengthened the college's reputation in the Pacific Northwest. Riley was particularly successful in encouraging Nazarenes of the Northwest to increase their financial support of the regional denominational college. He retired as president in 1973 and became a missionary in Africa, Australia, Israel, and Switzerland for five years. He published From Sagebrush to Ivy: The Story of NNC 1913-1988 in 1988 and died in 2001 at the age of 92.

== Publications ==
R and R: Recollections and Reflections. Caldwell, ID: Bible Books. Limited Edition. 1992.

From Sagebrush to Ivy: The Story of Northwest Nazarene College: 1913 to 1988 Nampa, Idaho: NNC,1988, 300 pp.

The Golden Stairs (Christian Service Training) Beacon Hill Press 1956

This Holy Estate-Guidance in Christian Homemaking: Beacon Hill Press: 1970

Nazarene Theological Dictionary: Contributor

Faith and Imagination: Essays on Evangelicals in Literature : 1985, 2012

== Legacy ==
The John E. Riley Library at Northwest Nazarene University is named in his honor.
