= Charles W. Akers =

American historian, author, and educator

- Born: Charles Wesley Akers; April 2, 1920; Indianapolis, Indiana, U.S.
- Died: February 1, 2009 (aged 88)
- Education: Eastern Nazarene College (BA); Boston University (MA, PhD)
- Occupations: Historian, author, educator
- Employer(s): Eastern Nazarene College (1948–1959); Quincy College (1957); Geneva College (1959–1966); Oakland University (1966–1995)

Charles Wesley Akers (April 2, 1920 – February 1, 2009) was an American historian, author, and educator.

== Early life and education ==
Charles was born in Indianapolis, Indiana, to Ira and Mary Bird Akers. Akers received his bachelor's degree in history from the Eastern Nazarene College in 1947. He received his master's degree and Ph.D. from Boston University.

== Career ==
Akers was a U.S. Navy veteran and served from 1942 to 1946 in the Second World War.

He began his career in education by teaching in the history department at his alma mater, the Eastern Nazarene College starting in 1948, took a leave of absence in 1957 to become the Director of Quincy Junior College, and left ENC in 1959. His next teaching position was at Geneva College in Beaver Falls, Pennsylvania. He began teaching history at Oakland University in 1966 and was appointed as chair of the history department there in 1968. He retired from OU in 1995 and was named professor emeritus of history there.

He was a member of the Colonial Society of Massachusetts, the American Historical Association, the Organization of American Historians, an Associate of Early American History and Culture, and received the Oakland University Excellence in Research Award and the Distinguished Faculty Award of the Michigan Association of Governing Boards.

== Published works ==
Akers' best known published work is Abigail Adams, an American Woman, published by Little, Brown and Company (Boston) in 1980, republished by Addison Wesley Longman (New York) in 2000, and called one of the three best books about Abigail Adams. He is also known for Called unto Liberty: A Life of Jonathan Mayhew, 1720-1766 and The Divine Politician, a biography of Samuel Cooper that won the American Revolution Roundtable Award.
