= Eastern Nazarene College =

Christian college in Quincy, Massachusetts, US (1900–2025)

- Seal of the Eastern Nazarene College
- Former names: Pentecostal Collegiate; Institute (1900–1918)
- Motto: Via, Veritas, Vita
- Motto in English: The Way, the Truth, and the Life
- Type: Private college
- Established: September 25, 1900 (PCI); June 14, 1918 (ENC)
- Religious affiliation: Nazarene
- Academic affiliations: CCCU, CIC, NAICU
- Location: Quincy, Brockton, Fall River
- Campus: 27 acres (11 ha); Urban/suburban
- Colors: Red & white
- Nickname: Lions
- Website: enc.edu

The Eastern Nazarene College (ENC) was a private Christian college in Quincy, Massachusetts, United States. Established as a holiness college in Saratoga Springs, New York, in 1900, the college moved to Rhode Island for several years. With its expansion to a four-year curriculum, it relocated to Wollaston Park in Quincy in 1919. It expanded to additional sites in Quincy and, in the late 20th century, to satellite sites across the state. Its academic programs were primarily undergraduate, with some professional graduate education offered.

In June 2024, ENC announced that it would close in May 2025.

The college had established "teach out" plans with Gordon College, Mount Vernon Nazarene University (the institution of record), and Trevecca Nazarene University.

The campus was put on the market. As of December 2025, the college's campus has not been sold.

== History ==
=== New York ===
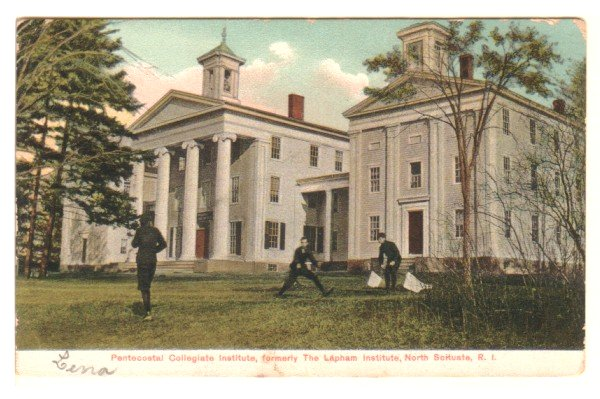
Classical Revival style Pentecostal Collegiate Institute, at the Rhode Island campus c. 1905

On September 25, 1900, several come-outer Methodist clergy and laymen affiliated with the 19th-century Holiness movement opened a co-educational collegiate institute at the Garden View House in Saratoga Springs, New York. In a time when pentecostal served as a synonym for holiness, it was named the Pentecostal Collegiate Institute (PCI). It was established to provide liberal education and ministry training in a preparatory academy, four-year college, and theological seminary. PCI operated under the auspices of the Association of Pentecostal Churches of America (APCA), a loose association of Wesleyan-holiness churches from eastern Canada down to the Middle Atlantic, and its own board of education. Lyman C. Pettit served as its first president. PCI was accredited by the New York State Education Department's board of regents of the University of the State of New York and was given state funding because a public school did not exist there at the time. In 1901, the institute changed locations in Saratoga Springs, from the Garden View House to the former Kenmore Hotel.

=== Rhode Island ===
The plans for a liberal arts college were delayed, however. There was a falling out between Pettit and the APCA. The school was moved to Rhode Island, where it re-opened on September 16, 1902, in North Scituate, Rhode Island. It did not yet have a post-secondary curriculum. Having been the originator of the idea for establishing PCI and having already surveyed the Rhode Island location, Fred A. Hillery had purchased the North Scituate campus on behalf of the association. Its Greek Revival buildings were originally designed for the Smithville Seminary in 1839 by Russell Warren, the leading Greek Revival architect in New England in the 19th century. The campus had been empty since 1876, when the Lapham Institute closed. After the move, the school attracted students from a variety of denominations. Only one-quarter to one-third of the student body was affiliated with the school's supporting denomination during any given academic year. In 1907, the APCA merged with the Church of the Nazarene. In 1908 PCI was one of the first three schools chosen to be officially affiliated with the Nazarenes.

In 1917, it was decided to develop the planned liberal arts college. On June 14, 1918, the Eastern Nazarene College was chartered with degree-granting authority in the state of Rhode Island. Secondary education was conducted by the Eastern Nazarene Academy. Choosing a new name, however, would be difficult: the school was now a liberal arts college and a Nazarene institution. Candidates included: "Northeastern Nazarene College", "Bresee Memorial College", "Nazarene College of the Northeast", and "Nazarene College and Bresee Theological Institute". General Superintendent John W. Goodwin is credited with the chosen name. He wrote to Hiram F. Reynolds, a general superintendent and long-time supporter of the school: "I know you will do your best for our New England College. I should be glad if they would change the name to the Eastern Nazarene College, or something like that. It would seem we must have a school there, although it moves along hard and slow."

=== Massachusetts ===
In 1919, the college moved to its current location in the Wollaston Park area of Quincy, Massachusetts. The founders wanted the new college to be located near either Harvard or Yale, so that its graduates could attend graduate school at one or the other. Quincy won out over New Haven, Connecticut because the educational standards were known to be higher in Massachusetts In addition, president-elect Fred J. Shields would accept the position only if the college were to be located near Boston. At the time of purchase, the 12-acre (49,000 m^{2}) property was the site of the Josiah Quincy Mansion (1848), built for Josiah Quincy Jr. Angell Hall was built here. Other buildings included one from 1896, used for the classroom building called the Manchester, stables (1848) (Memorial Hall was built in 1948 on this site), and one from 1901, which now serves as Canterbury Hall. The former PCI campus in Rhode Island was purchased in 1920 by William S. Holland, who moved his Watchman Institute there in 1923. He served African-American youths at that location for decades.

Presidents
	J. E. L. Moore	1918–1919
1.	Frederick James Shields	1919–1923
2.	Floyd William Nease	1923–1930
3.	Robert Wayne Gardner	1930–1936
4.	Gideon Brooks Williamson	1936–1944
5.	Samuel Young	1944–1948
6.	Edward Stebbins Mann	1948–1970
7.	A. Leslie Parrott Jr.	1970–1975
8.	Donald Irwin	1975–1980
9.	Stephen Wesley Nease	1980–1989
10.	Cecil Roland Paul	1989–1992
11.	Kent R. Hill	1992–2001
	Albert L. Truesdale Jr.	2001–2002
12.	J. David McClung	2002–2005
13.	Corlis A. McGee	2005–2017
	Dan Boone (Note: Dan Boone was not president, but was instead the president-elect. There was no president during this time.)	2017–2018
	Timothy Wooster (Note: Timothy Wooster was not president, but was Provost, Chief Operating Officer, and Chief Executive Officer. There was no president during this time.)	2018–2019
14	Jack Connell	2019–2023
15	Colleen Derr	2023–2025

The trustees of the college were incorporated by the state in 1920, by which time its liberal arts identity had been "quite firmly established." It did not gain Bachelor of Arts degree-granting power from the commonwealth for another decade, after the curriculum and faculty were established. On January 28, 1930, President Floyd W. Nease appealed directly to the General Court of Massachusetts for degree-granting authority, defending ed his petition before the Joint Committee on Education and the state House and Senate. He cited financial records, campus improvement plans, and prominent community leaders; the bill passed in both houses and was signed by Governor Frank G. Allen on March 12, 1930. The news reached the college the following afternoon. The next year under President R. Wayne Gardner, the trustees reaffirmed that the college would remain "distinctly interdenominational and cosmopolitan in service."

The college seal, designed by alumnus Harold G. Gardner and incorporating the college motto, Via, Veritas, Vita (Way, Truth and Life), was adopted by the trustees on the recommendation of the president and the student body in 1932. A college banner displayed the emblems of Verbum, Lux, Spiritus, Crux. The college had been chartered in 1918 with a school of music, President Gardner secured certification for the college as a teacher-training institution with the Massachusetts Department of Education in 1933. The college established a graduate program in theology starting in 1938. It was one of two Nazarene schools before 1945 to offer graduate courses. Evolutionary biology was taught in the classroom at least as early as 1937. On May 8, 1941, Governor Leverett Saltonstall approved Eastern Nazarene to grant Bachelor of Science degrees. By 1943 ENC had a cooperative degree program in engineering with Northeastern University.

College seal on the main campus gate, a gift of the class of 1938

Under President Gideon B. Williamson on December 3, 1943, the Eastern Nazarene College gained accreditation from the New England Association of Colleges and Secondary Schools. It was the second Nazarene college to gain institutional accreditation. ENC was admitted to the Association of American Colleges in 1944, and an affiliation with Quincy City Hospital for nurses' training began in that same year. Eastern Nazarene was soon dubbed "Our Quincy's College" by the Quincy Patriot Ledger. It works to maintain good town and gown relations with the city.

The Eastern Nazarene Academy closed after 1955. Starting in 1956, professors Timothy L. Smith and Charles W. Akers began to establish a community college for the city of Quincy.

In 1964, the graduate course in theology was discontinued and replaced with a master's degree program in religion. The college archives were created in 1963. The first history of the college, spanning from 1900 to 1950, was published by James R. Cameron in 1968.

Under President Irwin in 1977, plans were made to relocate the college to a 125-acre (510,000 m^{2}) parcel of land in Newtown Square, Pennsylvania, by purchasing the faltering Charles E. Ellis School for Girls. The proposed move was unpopular among students and members of the Quincy community. Governor Michael Dukakis also urged the administration to reconsider. The college was outbid for the land by a corporation that wanted to establish an industrial park, and it stayed in Quincy. In 1981, graduate degree offerings were expanded. It started an accelerated program for working adults in 1990. In 1991, a report issued by the Association of Independent Colleges and Universities in Massachusetts (AICUM) determined that the college contributed nearly $10 million to the local economy and brought in an estimated $7 million from outside the state.

In 1992, President Kent Hill approved a policy to hire only Christian professors at the college. This decision generated controversy in the media but was intended for the hiring of new faculty. The American Civil Liberties Union (ACLU) determined that it was reasonable according to civil rights laws. A second history of the college, spanning from 1950 to 2000, was started in 1993.

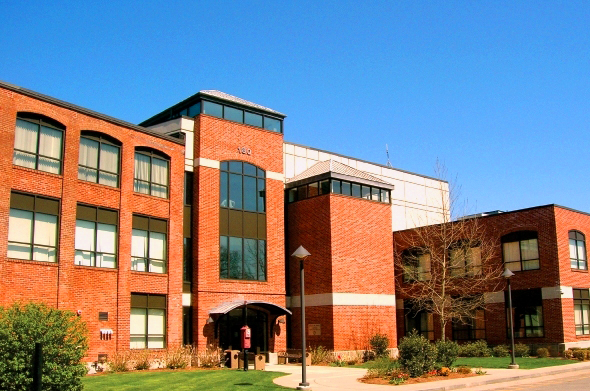
Front entrance to the Adams Executive Center in Quincy

In 1995, the college pursued relocation to a larger campus, planning to purchase the former 56-acre (230,000 m^{2}) campus of the Boston School for the Deaf in Randolph, Massachusetts, from the Sisters of St. Joseph, but the deal fell through. Instead, the college began to expand at other locations in Quincy, buying a piece of land along Hancock Street later that year, and the year after that purchasing an adjoining parcel along Old Colony Avenue. This was the former site of a Howard Johnson's candy factory and executive offices. In 1997, the college expanded beyond the metro Boston area for the first time, establishing a learning annex in central Massachusetts to serve as part of its adult studies division.

The Old Colony Campus (OCC) in Wollaston, as the new site on Old Colony Avenue had come to be named, was renovated as the Adams Executive Center. The Cecil R. Paul Center for Business was founded at the Old Colony location in 1999, and the James R. Cameron Center for History, Law, & Government was added in 2005. In 2001, just before the end of his second term, then-president Kent R. Hill was appointed the new Global Health Administrator for USAID. In 2008, ENC established satellite campuses in Boston, Brockton, Fall River, and Swansea, Massachusetts.

=== Closure ===
In June 2024, ENC's board of trustees announced that college would close at the end of the 2024-2025 academic year and transition "into a new educational enterprise that will carry on ENC's legacy". They cited significant, ongoing financial challenges, attributing the financial difficulties to the “enrollment cliff", a decline in the number of graduating high school seniors seeking college opportunities. The school had also offered too much student financial aid to athletes and international students. The trustees noted that the college had established "teach out" plans with three institutions: Gordon College, Mount Vernon Nazarene University, and Trevecca Nazarene University. Most students transferred out; by November, only 78 students had remained on campus.

In April 2025, the Eastern Nazarene College Transition Board announced an agreement to sell the entire campus to developer Crain Company, and that Mount Vernon Nazarene College would be ENC's institution of record. The school would also stop its accreditation on May 30, after its academic operations were over. The plan would create "Eastern Nazarene Estates", splitting the campus into 30 single-family lots and two multifamily lots. Moreover, Crain Company's founder Graham Crain, an ENC alumnus, also planned to keep the preschool, front lawn, library, and administrative building, while demolishing some of the other buildings. After the plan was announced, Crain got three more offers for the ENC campus.

On November 18, the Transition Board announced that the previous agreement would not be finalized and that other offers for the campus are still being considered.

== College rankings ==
In 2010, Eastern Nazarene College was ranked in the top tier for northern U.S. regional colleges in U.S. News & World Report's Best Colleges report. It was also ranked 28th overall (specifically 25th in number of graduates going on to earn PhDs and 11th in number of alumni serving in the Peace Corps, relative to college size) by the Washington Monthly College Guide for baccalaureate colleges nationally in 2010.

== Campus ==
=== Wollaston Park ===
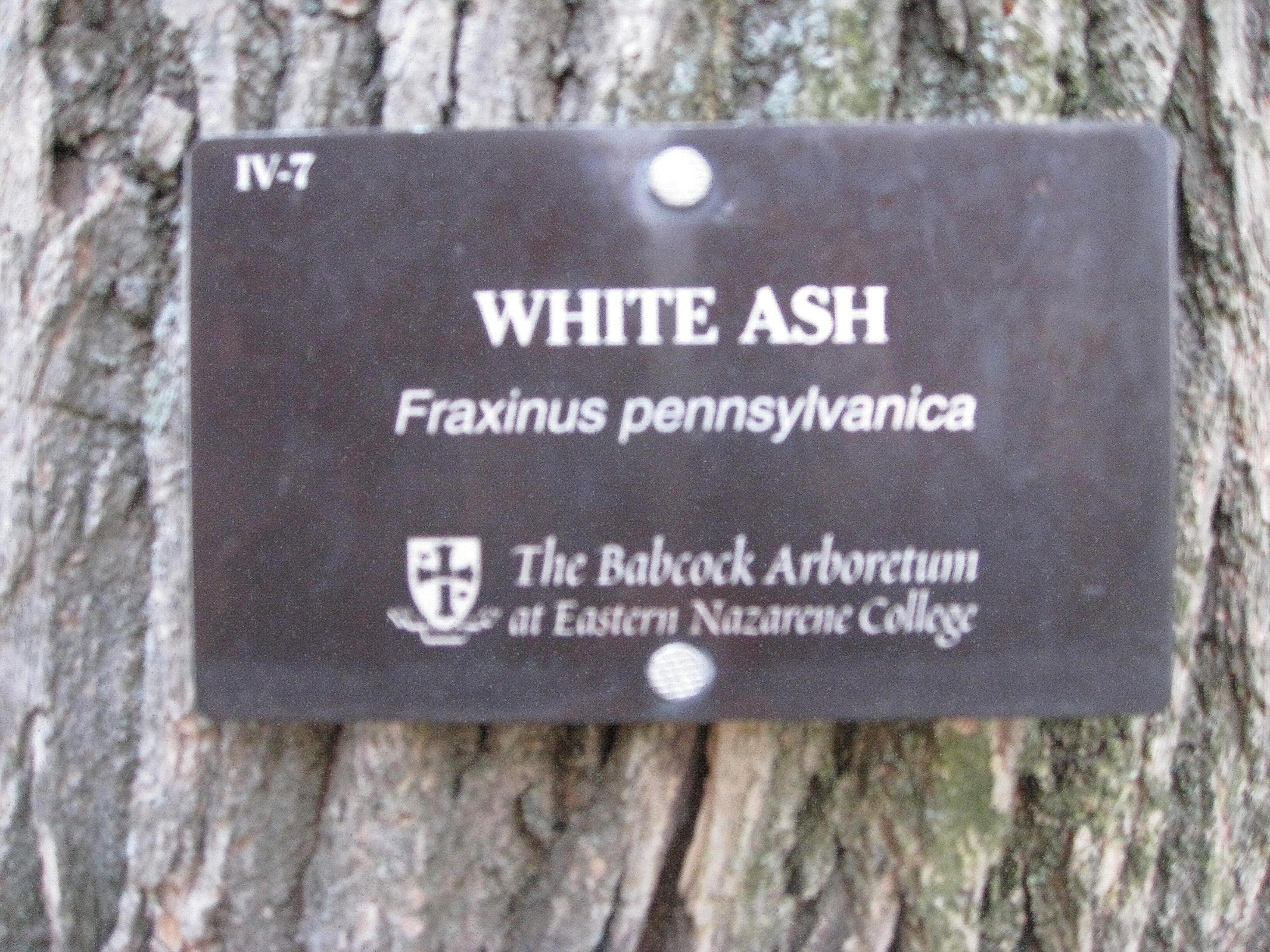
The college campus is home to the Babcock Arboretum.

The 21-acre (85,000 m^{2}) main campus of the Eastern Nazarene College is situated in the Wollaston Park neighborhood of Quincy, Massachusetts. The Wollaston Park campus is 1.5 miles (2.4 km) southeast from the Boston city line and 6 miles (9.7 km) south of downtown Boston, just over 1 mile (1.6 km) north of Quincy Center, 0.5 miles (0.80 km) northeast of the Wollaston T station, and 0.25 miles (0.40 km) southwest from Wollaston Beach. ENC purchased the Wollaston Park property, as a 12-acre (49,000 m^{2}) parcel, from the former Quincy Mansion School for Girls for $50,000 in 1919. It has added to it over the years. The Mount Wollaston land belonging to the Quincy family had been broken up into prestigious building lots and named Wollaston Park in the late 19th century, to become one of Boston's first commuter neighborhoods, The area remains primarily residential.

The campus has a registered arboretum, named the Babcock Arboretum after Vernor J. Babcock, and dedicated in 1993. The alma mater, set to the tune of "Annie Lisle" with lyrics written by former president Edward S. Mann, refers to Quincy Bay and the elm trees for which Elm Avenue was named. These died with the onset of Dutch elm disease in the early to mid-20th century.

The Anglican Parish of Saint George, established by the Anglican Mission in America, has been on campus since 2009.

== Historic buildings ==
The chandeliers of the Quincy Mansion (1848) were sold during the Great Depression in order to buy food for the students. The mansion was demolished in 1969 and Angell Hall was built on this site.

The mansion was part of the Quincy family homestead, along with the Dorothy Quincy House and the Josiah Quincy House, on a 200-acre (0.81 km^{2}) parcel of land known as the "Lower Farm". The mansion was the summer home of Josiah Quincy Jr., then mayor of Boston. It was three stories and white, in Georgian architecture, with marble fireplaces in most of the rooms and large French windows on the first floor that "opened upon either little balconies or broad piazzas." Elm Avenue had been the avenue, or driveway, for the two mansions on the property. The first of the two, the Josiah Quincy House (1770), still stands on Muirhead Street.

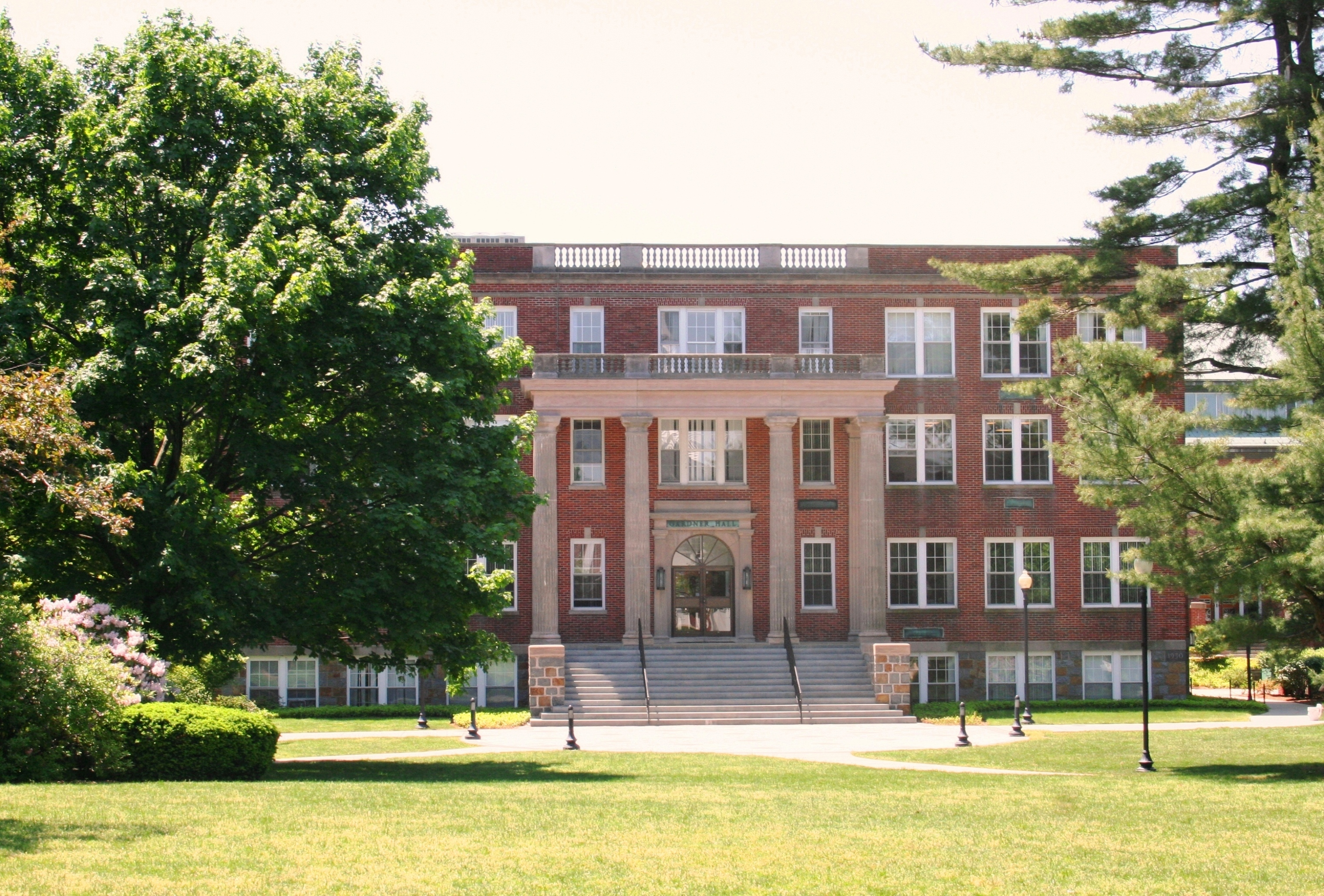
Gardner Hall (1930), the main college administration building

Both Gardner Hall (1930), originally named the Fowler Memorial Administration Building after Charles J. Fowler, and the original Floyd W. Nease Library (1953), now the Bower-Grimshaw Center for Institutional Advancement, were designed by Wesley Angell. Gardner Hall was designed in the Classical or Colonial Revival mode. Gardner is brick, three stories on a high granite basement, and capped by a parapet balustraded in the center. Corners are articulated with brick quoins. The fenestration is symmetric with double sash windows at regular intervals, trimmed in white, topped with flared brick lintels and a white keystone. It also features a two-story balustraded Doric portico of fluted cast stone columns. The portico is the backdrop for commencement ceremonies. The main entrance, at the end of wide stairs, is pilastered and topped with a bracketed entablature, which frames an arched glass opening. The side elevations have projecting stair towers, which indicate the site of a central hall running the length of the building. Originally rectangular in form, the 1953 addition of the then-Nease Library in the rear gave it a T-configuration.

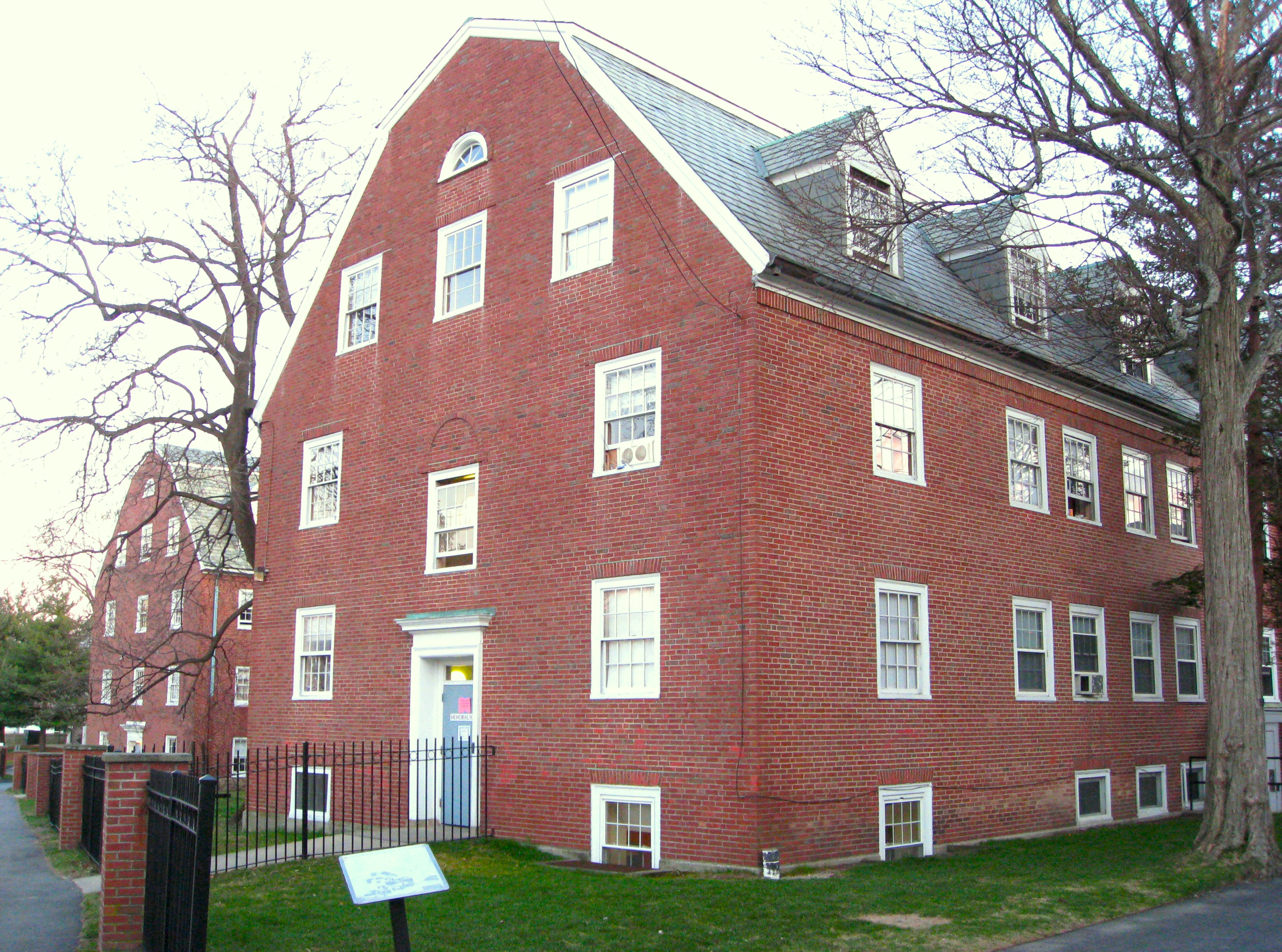
Memorial Hall (1948), for those who served and died in World War II

Memorial Hall (1948) is the only building on campus, other than the pre-existing Canterbury Hall (1901), not to be named for an individual. Rather, it was built as a memorial to those who had served in the Second World War. Over two hundred alumni had served, and six students had lost their lives in the war.

=== Old Colony and other locations ===
The 6-acre (24,000 m^{2}) Old Colony Campus (OCC), named for its location on Old Colony Avenue in Quincy, has two buildings. The "180 building" is the Adams Executive Center, which houses the business department in the Cecil R. Paul Center for Business, established in 1999. The building at 162 Old Colony houses the college archives and offices for the history department, as part of the James R. Cameron Center for History, Law, and Government, established in 2005. It also has separate offices for mathematics, and physics and engineering departments. In addition, the Campus Kinder Haus (CKH), an early childhood education center, is located here. CKH was founded in 1979 and moved to the Old Colony Campus in 2000. The college also owns adjacent undeveloped land between Old Colony and Hancock streets in Quincy, at the Southern Artery. This has been rezoned by the city several times. Quincy officials announced in 2009 that they might take the land by eminent domain for construction of a new middle school.

In addition to its campuses in Quincy, the college established a learning annex called the Auburn Learning Center in Auburn, Massachusetts, in 1997 to serve as part of the Leadership Education for Adults Division. In 2008 it added satellite campuses in Boston, Brockton, Fall River, and Swansea.

== Organization ==
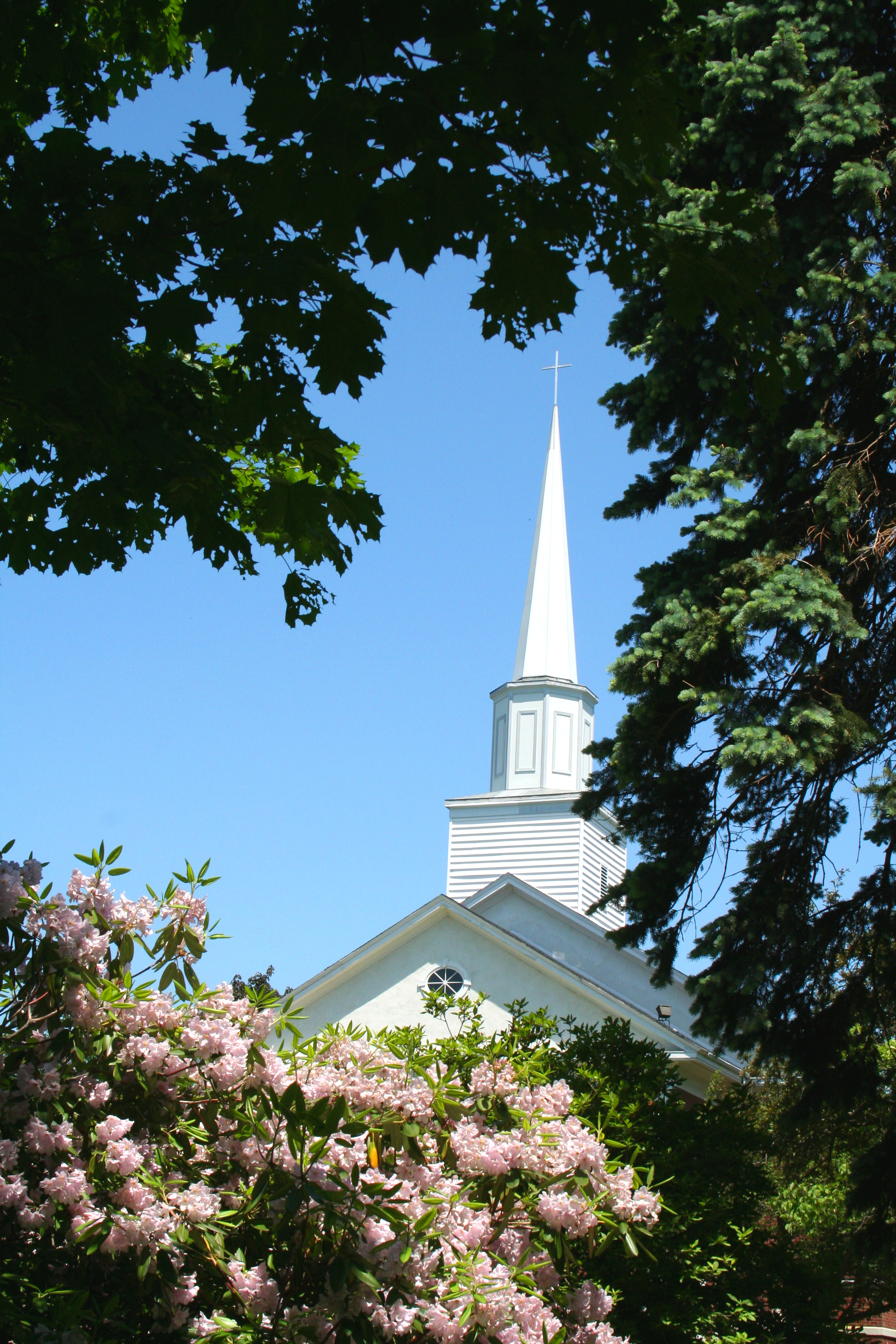
The Wollaston Church of the Nazarene seen from the college campus in Wollaston Park

=== Religious affiliation ===
Higher education is, historically, one of the Nazarenes' most important emphases. The Nazarenes provide their colleges with "students, administrative and faculty leadership, and financial and spiritual support.... the college, while not a local congregation, is an integral part of the church; it is an expression of the church." Founded under the auspices of the Association of Pentecostal Churches of America, ENC was one of the first three schools officially chosen to be Nazarene institution in 1915. As one of eight Nazarene liberal arts colleges, Nazarene higher education is based on the liberal arts college model. ENC was the only Nazarene institution to retain the "college" moniker. Eastern Nazarene was also bound by a gentlemen's agreement not to actively recruit outside its respective educational region, which extended southwest from Maine as far as Pennsylvania and Virginia in the United States and provided trustees for the college. The institution was otherwise largely independent, having been multi-denominational since 1902, and tuition-driven, with an actual endowment of only US$11,015,937. Students were not required to profess any religion, although chapel attendance was required and faculty members were required to be Christians.

=== Academic associations ===
The now-defunct secondary school, the Pentecostal Collegiate Institute, was accredited by the New York State Education Department's board of regents upon its founding in 1900. When it was first chartered in 1918, the Eastern Nazarene College was granted the authority to grant baccalaureate degrees in Rhode Island, and was later chartered with that same authority in Massachusetts in 1930. Teacher education was recognized by the Department of Education of the Commonwealth of Massachusetts in 1933 and was also approved by the National Association of State Directors of Teacher Education and Certification and the Massachusetts Board of Higher Education. ENC gained institutional accreditation from the Commission on Institutions of Higher Education of the New England Association of Schools and Colleges (NEASC) in 1943, and the social work program has been accredited by the Council on Social Work Education since 1979. Eastern Nazarene joined the Association of American Colleges in 1944, had been a member of the Council for Christian Colleges and Universities (CCCU) since 1982, and was also a member of both the Council of Independent Colleges (CIC) and the National Association of Independent Colleges and Universities (NAICU).

== Academics ==
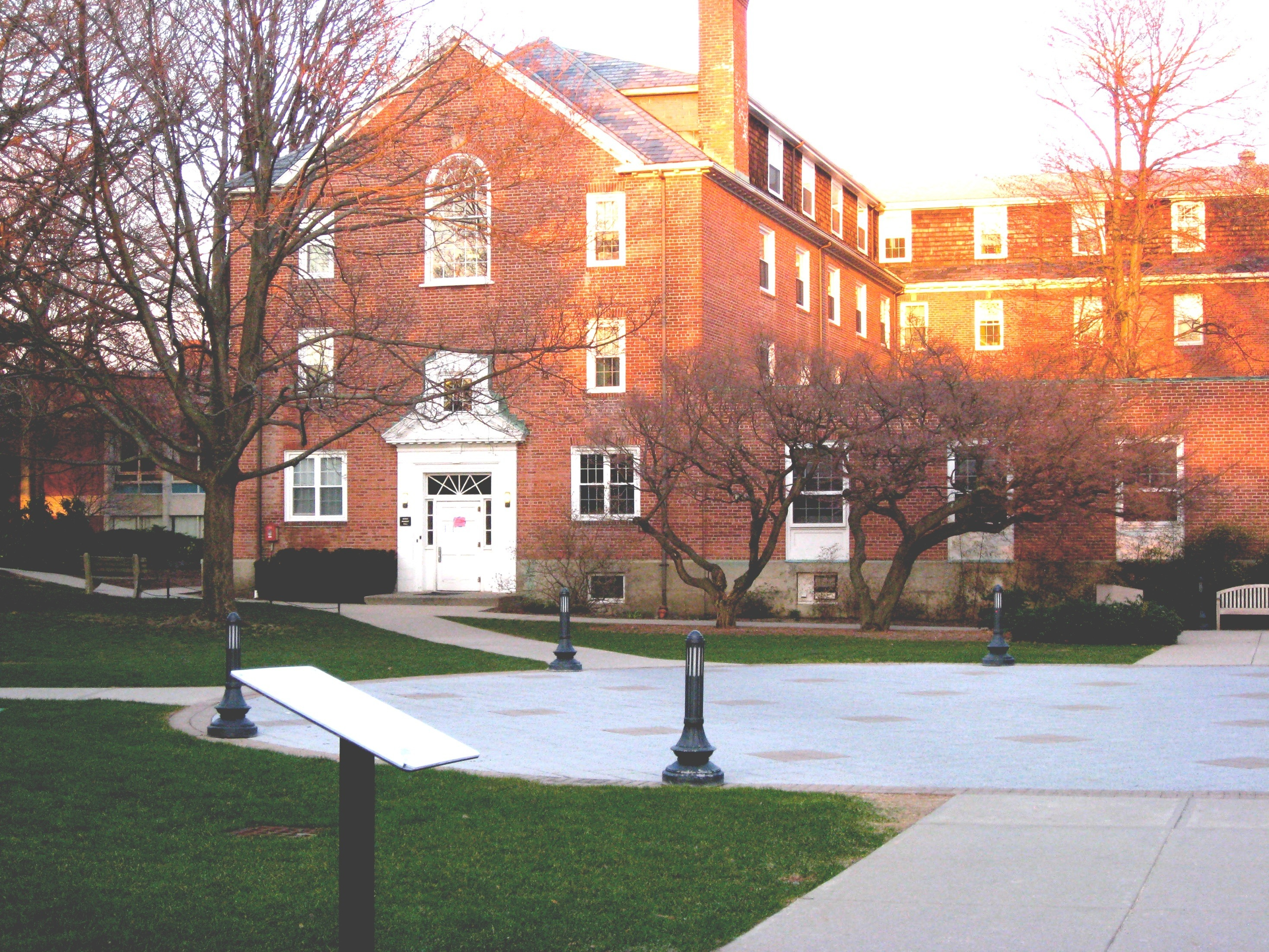
Munro Hall (1926), the first building erected by the college in Massachusetts

Bertha Munro, the first dean of the college, was often quoted as having said that "there is no conflict between the best in education and the best in Christian faith" and former history professor Timothy L. Smith, who began his career at ENC, is widely considered the first evangelical Christian to gain academic prominence, while ENC alumnus and physicist Karl Giberson has worked to address the Creation-Evolution controversy and was executive vice president of the BioLogos Foundation until May 2011. Though it made no religious requirements of its students, Eastern Nazarene required that its faculty members be Christian since 1993. The school had three college divisions: the Traditional Undergraduate Division, the Adult Studies Division (often called the Leadership Education for Adults Division, or LEAD), and the Graduate Division. There were 1,075 students enrolled at the college in 2007, 927 of whom were undergraduate and 148 of whom were graduate students. Admission is selective on a rolling deadline and the 2007 acceptance rate for students who applied to the college was 61.7 percent.

=== Traditional Undergraduate division ===
Most degree offerings at Eastern Nazarene were baccalaureate degrees. In the Traditional Undergraduate Division, the college offered associate's and bachelor's (Bachelor of Arts and Bachelor of Science) liberal arts degrees in 50 majors, with 57 minors and six pre-professional programs for a combined total of 80 programs of study. In addition to co-operative programs and internship opportunities around Boston, Eastern Nazarene provided a number of intercollegiate and off-campus programs at 56 Nazarene institutions of higher education around the world. The college used a "4-1-4 system" for its academic year: there were two full semesters in the Fall and Spring, each roughly four months long, and a one-month term in May known as "May Term".

Eastern Nazarene emphasized a blend of faith and other pursuits, from biology to business, and won the John Templeton award for science-and-religion education. The undergraduate curriculum at Eastern Nazarene was developed in 1919 by the first dean of the college, Bertha Munro, and originally modeled after the curricula at Radcliffe College and Boston University. Graduates on average had a 94 percent acceptance rate into medical school as well as a 100 percent acceptance rate into law school.

=== Graduate Division and LEAD ===
College name and shield on the side of the Cecil R. Paul Center for Business at the Old Colony Campus

In addition to traditional undergraduate education, the college offered continuing education for working adults through the Leadership Education for Adults Division (LEAD), including bachelor's degree completion (Bachelor of Arts and Bachelor of Science degrees) and associate degrees (the associate of arts degree) as well as certificates in paralegal studies (CPS) and human resource management (CHRM).

Graduate offerings from the Graduate Division were primarily master's degrees (Master of Science and Master of Education). Eastern Nazarene first offered graduate work in theology in 1938, then replaced it with a master's degree in religion in 1964, and added master's degrees in business, education, and psychology in 1981.

== Student life ==
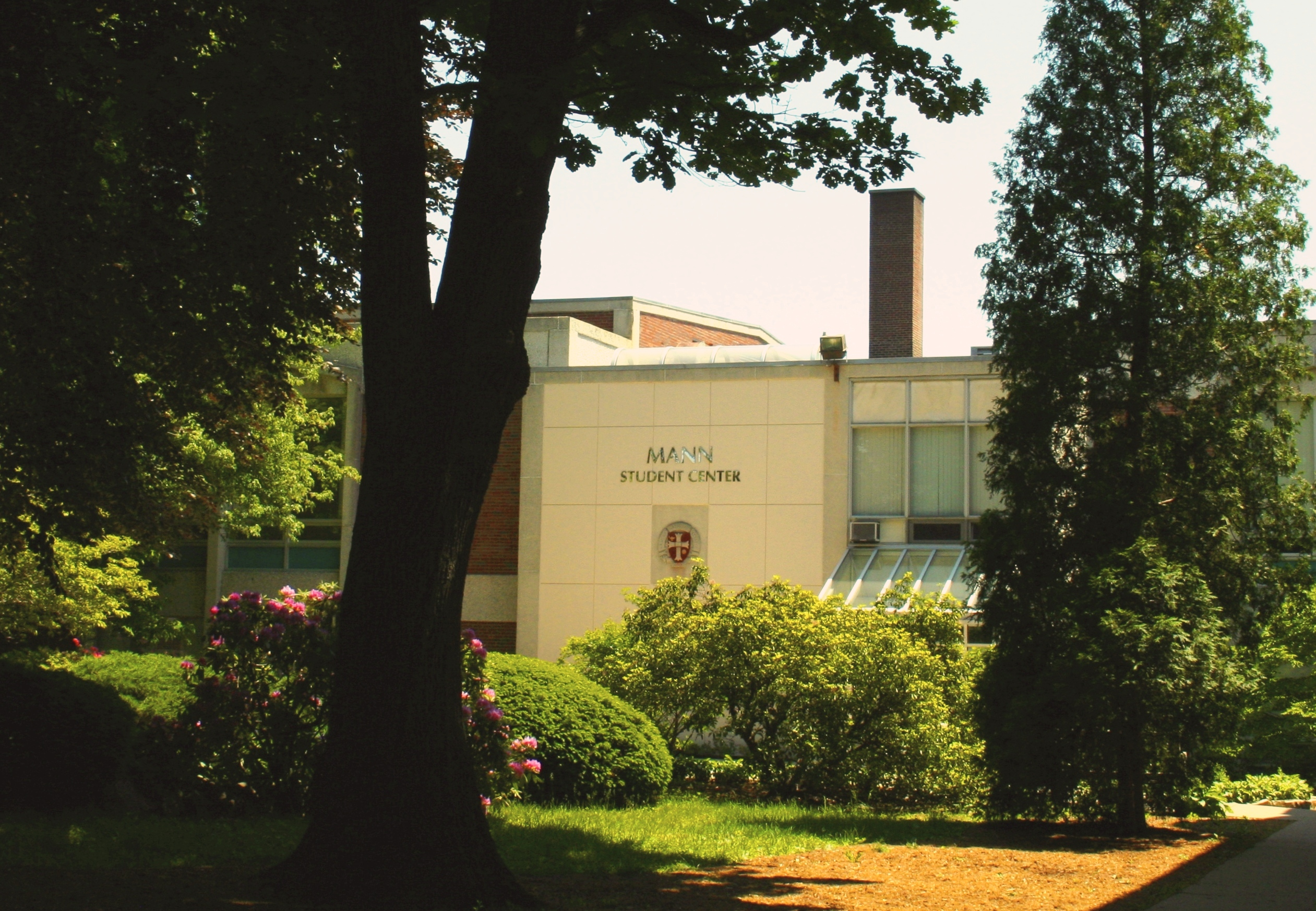
The Mann Student Center, named for Edward S. Mann

ENC was 24 percent ethnically diverse, the highest diversity rate among the eight Nazarene liberal arts colleges, and black student enrollment rose from 4.9 to 15 percent between 1997 and 2007. Eastern Nazarene has always been co-educational, and most of the traditional undergraduate population lives on campus. Undergraduate students at ENC were typically affiliated with approximately 30 different Christian denominations (the largest representations being Nazarene, Baptist, Catholic, and non-denominational), while 35 percent of the student population had no reported denominational or religious affiliation.

No student was required to be Christian to attend, but each traditional undergraduate student, upon registering, agreed to what was called a Lifestyle Covenant: to, among other things, "abstain from the use of illegal drugs, alcohol and tobacco, and to avoid attendance at bars, clubs, or other activities or places of entertainment that promote themes of inappropriate sexuality, violence, profanity, pornography or activities demeaning to human life." The Student Handbook also specifies that "No person shall engage in sexual acts with anyone other than a spouse." While some guidelines might appear to be "relics from another era," according to the Boston Globe, the Globe has also noted that other prominent Christian colleges uphold these ideals, and that Eastern Nazarene is known for being a progressive "trendsetter" with a "slightly more liberal bent" than its peers. The John Templeton Foundation has also cited Eastern Nazarene College as an institution that builds character, and the Quincy Patriot Ledger has said that the school's "deep religious roots make for a quiet campus and good neighbors."

=== Extracurriculars ===
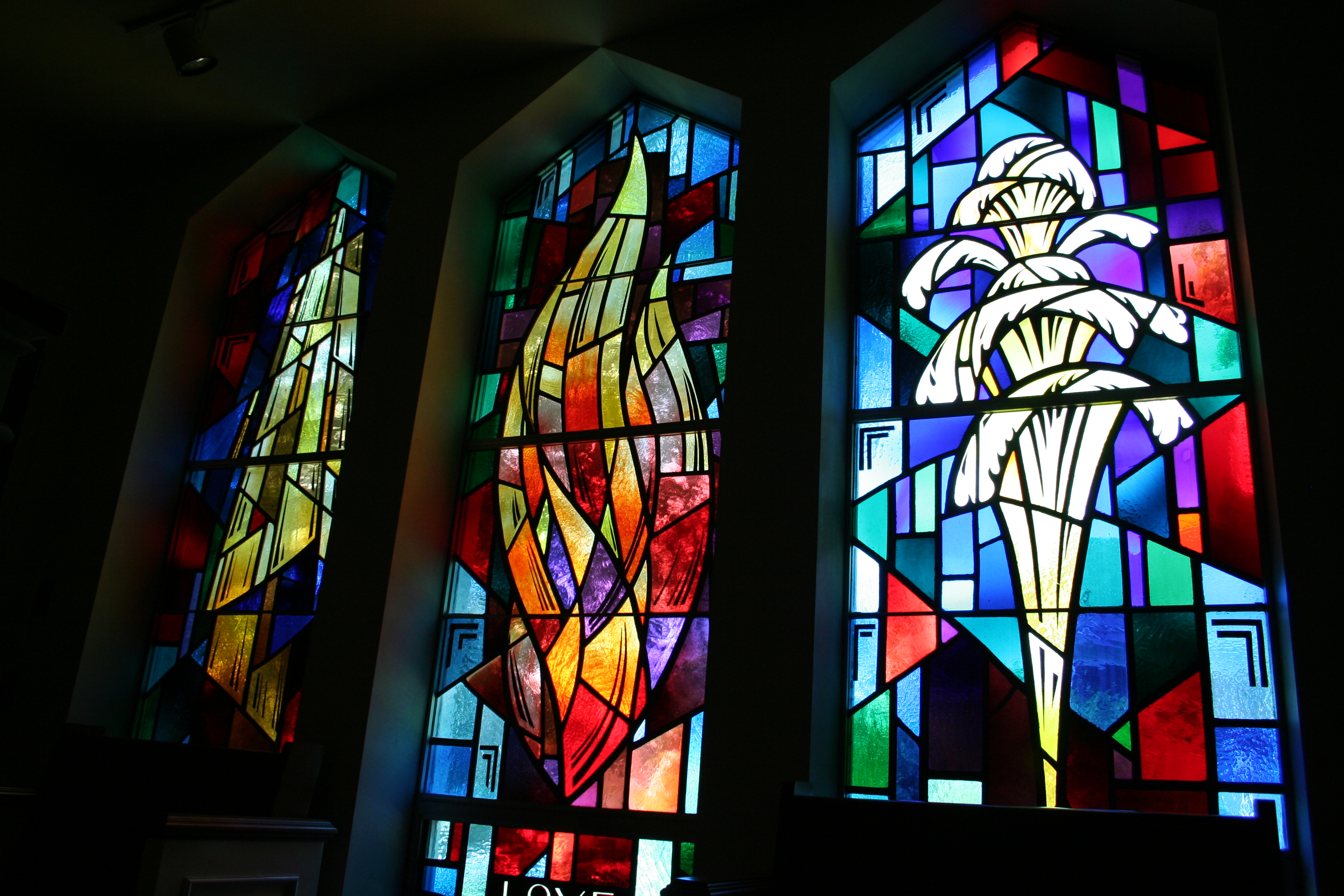
The stained glass windows of Angell Chapel in Angell Hall

There were no fraternities or sororities on campus, but there were Greek "societies". Until 2002, there were four societies based on intramural sports competition, which included the "Kappa Cougars", the "Sigma Stallions", and the "Zeta Warriors". New societies were formed in 2007 and originally numbered eight but were reduced to four again in 2008.

There had been an Honors Scholar Society since 1936, and there are various national honors societies (Phi Alpha Theta for history majors, Phi Delta Lambda for Nazarene scholars, Psi Chi for psychology majors, etc.). Students participate in the Student Government Association (SGA), Class Council, Students for Social Justice, academic clubs (Beta Phi Mu Shrader Club, Biology Club, History Club, etc.), and club sports. The student-run newspaper is "The Veritas News" (formerly the Campus Camera), since 1933 and regularly published since 1936, and the student-developed yearbook has been the Nautilus since 1922.

There were vocal and instrumental ensembles, including the A Cappella Choir, which was formed in 1938, and Chamber Singers, Gospel Choir, Symphonic Winds, and Jazz Band, among several others. The college also had a student theatre organization. There existed both campus-oriented and community-oriented ministries like as "Open Hand, Open Heart", which ministered to the homeless of Boston by providing food, clothing, and blankets. In addition to its study abroad programs, ENC also provides missions opportunities through a program known as "Fusion". Locally, environmental management students have been involved in community cleanup programs and archaeological investigations around Quincy.

==== Athletics ====
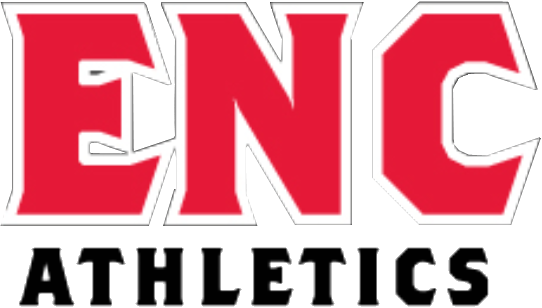
ENC Lions wordmark

Intercollegiate athletics at ENC first began in 1959 with wins over Gordon, Curry, and Barrington Colleges in baseball. Varsity sports were National Collegiate Athletic Association (NCAA) Division III, Commonwealth Coast Conference (CCC), and New England Collegiate Conference (NECC). Along with NNU, ENC was one of only two Nazarene colleges to compete in the NCAA. Men's varsity sports included baseball, basketball, cross-country, golf, soccer, tennis, track and field, and volleyball. Women's sports included basketball, cross-country, soccer, softball, tennis, track and field, and volleyball. When NAIA-affiliated, Eastern Nazarene regularly won the basketball tournament hosted by The King's College. The college also won the ECAC Division III Championship in 1996 and went to the NCAA Division III Sweet 16 in 2000.

Eastern Nazarene's athletic nickname was "Lions". From 1959 until 2009, the athletic moniker was "Crusaders". The college colors were red and white. Bradley Field is named in honor of Carroll Bradley, one-time professional baseball player and the first athletic director at Eastern Nazarene, and the LaHue Physical Education Center at ENC also serves as a clinical site for Northeastern University.

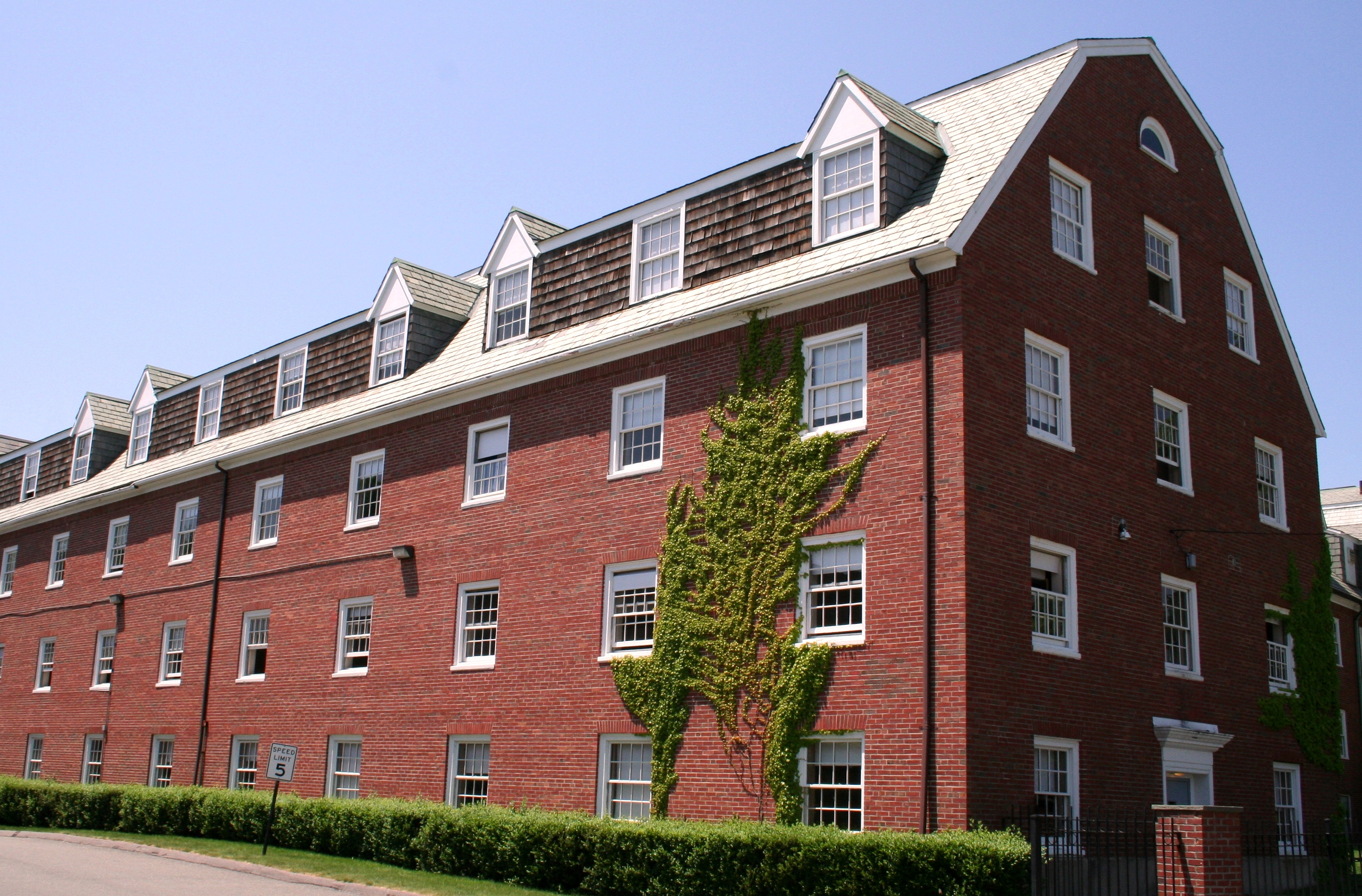
Shields Hall, the residence hall for male freshmen

=== Residential life ===
Students lived in single-sex residence halls. There were three female dormitories (Spangenberg Hall, Williamson Hall, and Munro Hall) and two male dormitories (Memorial Hall and Shields Hall). Young Hall provided apartments for staff and married students, in addition to suites for upperclassman females and males.

The Mann Student Center housed The Commons for sit-down meals cafeteria-style, as well as The Dugout for meals in a café-type atmosphere. Chapel services for undergraduate students, which were 40 minutes long, are offered on Wednesdays and Fridays. Attendance for most chapels is required for most undergraduates.

== Notable persons ==
=== Notable alumni ===
Samuel Young, Edward S. Mann, and Stephen W. Nease were all ENC alumni and presidents of Eastern Nazarene College. Russell V. DeLong served two non-consecutive terms as president of Northwest Nazarene College, and also served as president of Pasadena College. John E. Riley, Kenneth H. Pearsall, and A. Gordon Wetmore also served as presidents of NNC. Stephen Nease and Gordon Wetmore later served as presidents of the Nazarene Theological Seminary. Stephen Nease was also the president of Bethany Nazarene College in Bethany, Oklahoma, and the founding president of Mount Vernon Nazarene College. William Henry Houghton was the fourth president of the Moody Bible Institute in Chicago], and Charles W. Akers was the first president of Quincy Junior College (QJC). Alumnus Donald Young, Samuel Young's son, would also become a president of Quincy College.

Lawrence Yerdon is the president of the Strawbery Banke Museum. He also served 1986-2004 as president of the Hancock Shaker Village, and was director of the Quincy Historical Society 1976–1986. Alumnus Edward Thomas Dell Jr. was a published author, the editor of The Episcopalian from 1968 to 1973, and founder of two magazines, and he kept a running correspondence with C. S. Lewis, which is now archived in the Bodleian Library and at Wheaton College. Ralph Earle Jr. served on the Committee on Bible Translation for the New International Version of the Bible.

John S. Rigden is an alumnus and physicist. Eldon C. Hall was the lead design engineer of the Apollo Guidance Computer (AGC) at MIT. Carl Crouthamel earned his doctorate at the University of Chicago after graduating from ENC, is known for his work with Enrico Fermi on the U.S. project that produced the first atomic bomb, started the first program to build a gamma ray lens for use in astronomy, and has worked for the Argonne National Laboratory.

Floyd Nease, Stephen's son and Floyd's grandson, served as a five-term state representative in Vermont and was elected majority leader (Democratic) in the Vermont House of Representatives. Nease served as executive director of three nonprofit human services agencies in Vermont, and as senior advisor for health care in the administration of Governor Peter Shumlin. James Sheets, former six-term Quincy mayor, is an Eastern Nazarene College graduate. David Bergers serves as the current director for the Boston Regional Office of the Securities and Exchange Commission, and attended Yale Law School after completing his undergraduate education at ENC.

Richard F. Schubert, another ENC alumnus and graduate of Yale Law School, was the founding president of the Points of Light Foundation, former president and vice chairman of the Bethlehem Steel Corporation, general counsel and deputy secretary for the U.S. Department of Labor, and president and chief executive officer (CEO) of the American Red Cross. Neil Nicoll is the current President & CEO of the YMCA. Jim Tabor is vice president for operations at AirTran Airways. Harry Palmer was president of Atco Records, a division of Atlantic Records that produced albums by The Rolling Stones, Aretha Franklin and AC/DC. Samuel Jean, graduated from Eastern Nazarene in 1992 with a bachelor's degree in history before graduating from Boston University School of Law in 1995 and is the founder of CityView Artist Management.

Esther R. Sanger, noted social worker, preacher, and founder of the Quincy Crisis Center and the Mary-Martha Learning Center, attended the Eastern Nazarene preparatory academy and earned a B.A. in social work and an M.A. in family counseling at ENC.

Donald Yerxa, Director of The Historical Society (THS) at Boston University

=== Notable faculty ===
Chemistry professor Lowell Hall is the creator of "Molconn", which Pfizer uses to test drug potency, and is emeritus program chairman of the Boston Area Group for Informatics and Modeling. History professor Randall J. Stephens is editor of both the Journal of Southern Religion and Historically Speaking, which is produced at Boston University and published by the Johns Hopkins University. Donald A. Yerxa is director of The Historical Society (THS) at Boston University. He and fellow history professor James R. Cameron both studied under Charles W. Akers and Timothy L. Smith.

Former faculty members of note include physicist John S. Rigden, historian and community college president Charles W. Akers, biblical scholar Ralph Earle Jr., historian Timothy L. Smith, theologian Thomas Jay Oord, inspector general and Massachusetts representative Robert A. Cerasoli, historian and seminary president Hugh C. Benner, and Olive Winchester. Presidents of the college who were first faculty members include Fred J. Shields in psychology, Floyd W. Nease in theology, R. Wayne Gardner in mathematics, Samuel Young in theology, Edward S. Mann in mathematics, and Cecil R. Paul in psychology. When Ann Kiemel Anderson was 25 years old, she became the Dean of Women.
