= Northwest Nazarene University =

Christian university in Nampa, Idaho, US

- Seal of Northwest Nazarene University
- Former names: Northwest Nazarene College (1917–1999); Northwest Holiness College (1916–1917); Idaho Holiness School (1913–1916)
- Motto: Seek Ye First the Kingdom of God
- Type: Private university
- Established: 1913; 113 years ago 1937; four-year
- Religious affiliation: Nazarene
- Academic affiliations: CCCU; Space-grant
- Endowment: US$40 million
- President: Mark DeMichael
- Students: 1,774 (fall 2023)
- Undergraduates: 1,068 (fall 2023)
- Postgraduates: 618 (fall 2023)
- Other students: 88 (fall 2023)
- Location: Nampa, Idaho, U.S. 43.562°N 116.565°W
- Campus: Suburban
- Colors: Red and black
- Nickname: Nighthawks
- Sporting affiliations: NCAA Division II (GNAC)
- Mascot: Nighthawks
- Website: nnu.edu
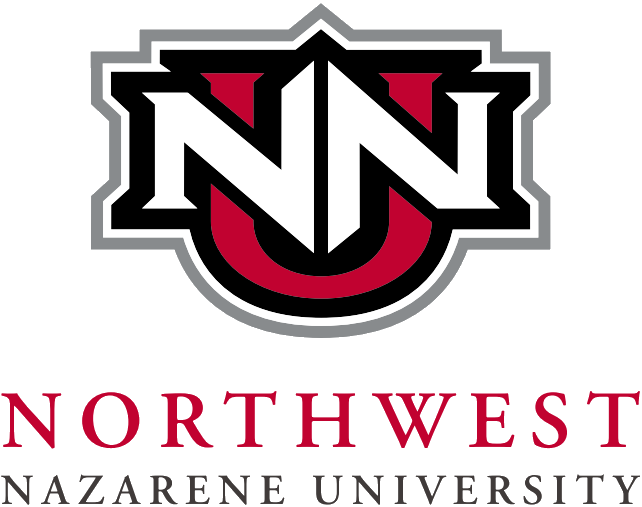

Northwest Nazarene University (NNU) is a private Nazarene university in Nampa, Idaho.

== History ==
Eugene Emerson organized a combination grade school and Bible school in 1913 as Idaho Holiness School. It was renamed twice in 1916, first to Northwest Holiness College and then to Northwest Nazarene College, and then became a liberal arts college in 1917 with degree-granting authority from the Idaho state Board of Education. While the college's first president, elected in 1916, was H. Orton Wiley of Pasadena University, Fred J. Shields filled in as acting president before leaving for the Eastern Nazarene College in 1919, while Wiley finished his graduate work.

Under Russell V. DeLong, Northwest Nazarene College (NNC) received educational accreditation as a two-year school in 1931 and as a four-year school in 1937, making it the first accredited college affiliated with the Church of the Nazarene. Master's degree programs were added in the 1960s and 1970s. It was renamed Northwest Nazarene University (NNU) in 1999.

Northwest Nazarene University was granted an exception to Title IX in 2014 which allows it to legally discriminate against LGBT students for religious reasons.

== Presidents ==
Presidents
	Fred J. Shields	1917–1919
1.	H. Orton Wiley	1919–1926
2.	Joseph G. Morrison	1926–1927
3.	Russell V. DeLong	1927–1932
4.	R. Eugene Gilmore	1932–1935
5.	Russell V. DeLong	1935–1942
6.	L.T. Corlett	1942–1952
7.	John E. Riley	1952–1973
8.	Kenneth H. Pearsall	1973–1983
9.	A. Gordon Wetmore	1983–1992
10.	Leon Doane	1992–1993
11.	Richard A. Hagood	1993–2008
12.	David Alexander	2008–2015
12.	Joel Pearsall	2016–2025
13.	Mark DeMichael	2025–present

== Affiliations ==
As one of seven U.S. liberal arts colleges affiliated with the Church of the Nazarene, the college receives financial backing from the Nazarene churches in its region. Each college is also bound by a gentlemen's agreement not to actively recruit outside its respective educational region.

NNU is a member of the Council for Christian Colleges and Universities (CCCU). NNU has been accredited by the Northwest Commission on Colleges and Universities (NWCCU) since 1930.

== Academics ==
Northwest Nazarene University has two colleges: the College of Arts and Sciences and the College of Adult and Graduate Studies. NNU offers over 60 baccalaureate degree programs, 11 master's degree programs, a Ph.D. degree program, and a Doctor of Psychology (Psy.D.) in clinical psychology. In addition to its 90-acre (36 ha) campus in Nampa, the university offers extensive online degree programs and has branch campuses in Boise, Twin Falls, and Idaho Falls.

== Student life ==
NNU is a co-educational college.

=== LGBTQ students ===
In 2019, NNU was ranked among the "Absolute Worst Campuses for LGBTQ Youth" in the US by Campus Pride. The Church of the Nazarene Manual 2017–2021 (Note: The online manual website indicates that "The provisions of the current Manual remain effective until modified by the 30th General Assembly, scheduled to convene in June of 2023, and a new version is announced by the Board of General Superintendents.") states that "we believe the practice of same-sex sexual intimacy is contrary to God’s will for human sexuality". The university's Notice of Non-discrimination states that "The University maintains the right, with regard to its lifestyle covenant, employment, and other matters, to uphold and apply its religious beliefs related to, among other issues, marriage, sex (gender), gender identity, sexual orientation, and sexual activity."

== Athletics ==
The Northwest Nazarene (NNU) athletic teams are called the Nighthawks (Crusaders until 2017). The university is a member of the Division II level of the National Collegiate Athletic Association (NCAA), primarily competing in the Great Northwest Athletic Conference (GNAC) since the 2001–02 academic year. The Nighthawks previously competed in the D-II Pacific West Conference (PacWest) during the 2000–01 school year; and in the Cascade Collegiate Conference (CCC) of the National Association of Intercollegiate Athletics (NAIA) from 1993–94 to 1999–2000.

NNU competes in 13 intercollegiate varsity sports: Men's sports include baseball, basketball, cross country, golf, soccer and track & field; while women's sports include basketball, cross country, golf, soccer, softball, track & field and volleyball.

== Notable people ==
=== Alumni ===
- Ann Kiemel Anderson - religious author, later dean at Eastern Nazarene College
- Donna Fletcher Crow – author
- Richard Hieb – NASA astronaut
- Kent R. Hill – former administrator for USAID's Bureau for Global Health and president of the Eastern Nazarene College (1992–2001)
- Ryan McCarthy – college basketball coach
- Thomas Jay Oord – theologian
- Lori Otter – First Lady of Idaho
- Mildred Bangs Wynkoop - theologian

=== Faculty members ===
- Fred J. Shields
- H. Orton Wiley
- Ben Fischer
- Olive Winchester
