= Atonement =

Concept of a person taking action to correct previous wrongdoing

Atonement, atoning, or making amends is the concept of a person taking action to correct previous wrongdoing on their part, either through direct action to undo the consequences of that act, equivalent action to do good for others, or some other expression of feelings of remorse. Atonement is "closely associated to forgiveness, reconciliation, sorrow, remorse, repentance, reparation, and guilt". It can be seen as a necessary step on a path to redemption. Expiation is the related concept of removing guilt, particularly the undoing of sin or other transgressions in religious contexts.

== Names ==
Atonement and atoning both derive from the verb atone, from the Middle English attone or atoon (meaning "agreed" or "at one"). Expiation is related to the verb expiate, from Latin expio meaning "to atone" or "to purge by sacrifice", from ex- ("out") and pio ("to purify", "to make pious").

== In law and society ==
In the legal systems, the concept of atonement plays an important role with respect to criminal justice, where it is considered one of the primary goals of criminal rehabilitation.

== In religion and behavior ==
In religion, atonement is "a spiritual concept which has been studied since time immemorial in Biblical and Kabbalistic texts", while "[s]tories of atonement are ubiquitous in religious discourse and the language of atonement fundamentally reveals a redemptive turn".

Concepts in religion include:

- Atonement in Judaism - the process of causing a transgression to be forgiven or pardoned. In Rabbinic Judaism, people achieve atonement through repentance, sometimes followed by some combination of confession, restitution, tribulations (unpleasant life experiences), the experience of dying, or other factors.
  - Another aspect of atonement is the occurrence of Yom Kippur (the day itself, as distinct from the Temple service performed on it), also known as "the Day of Atonement", which is a biblical/Jewish observance.
- Atonement in Christianity, in western Christian theology, describes beliefs that human beings can be reconciled to God through Christ's sacrificial suffering and death. Atonement refers to the forgiving or pardoning of sin in general and original sin in particular through the suffering, death and resurrection of Jesus, Throughout the centuries, Christians have used different metaphors and given differing explanations of atonement to express how atonement might work. Churches and denominations may vary in which metaphor or explanation they consider most accurately fits into their theological perspective; however all Christians emphasize that Jesus is the Saviour of the world and through his death the sins of humanity have been forgiven, enabling the reconciliation between God and his creation. Within Christianity there are, historically, three or four main theories for how such atonement might work:
  - Ransom theory/Christus Victor (which are different, but generally considered together as Patristic or "classical", to use Gustaf Aulén's nomenclature, theories, it being argued that these were the traditional understandings of the early Church Fathers);
  - Satisfaction theory developed by Anselm of Canterbury (called by Aulén the "scholastic" view);
  - Moral influence theory, a concept that had been developed by the time of Enlightenment, which Aulén called the "subjective" or "humanistic" view and considered to have been anticipated—as a critique of the satisfaction view—by Peter Abelard.
  - Other theories include recapitulation theory, the "shared atonement" theory and scapegoat theory.
  - Additional views include the governmental view, penal substitution view, and substitutionary atonement
- Prāyaścitta, the practice in Hinduism where a person practices rites to undo their sins, such as meditation and pilgrimages.
- Tawba, in Islam where a person has to make up for one's sins against God and anyone they had harmed.
- The Nation of Islam celebrated a Day of Atonement which the Nation established during the Million Man March in Washington, DC on October 16, 1995. The day involved black men swearing to refrain from crime, drug addiction, abuse, or any form of violence not in self defence. The oath also involved a promise to support black business and artists and avoid misogynistic language.

Concepts of atonement also exist in other religious views. For example, in Native American and Mestizo cultures of the Americas, "[s]ince sin and guilt are among the principal causes of illness and maladjustment... confession, atonement, and absolution are frequent rituals used in treatment. In some cases, atonement is accomplished through prayer or penance; in others, it may involve cleansing the body, accomplished by brushing the body with branches of rosemary or by sprinkling it with holy water".

Concepts of universal atonement can transcend all religions, as in unlimited atonement, the doctrine that the atonement is unlimited in extent, and universal reconciliation, the doctrine that all will eventually come to salvation.

Twelve-step programs include an atonement or "making amends" phase (steps 8 and 9).

== See also ==
- Absolution
- Propitiation, sometimes conflated with atonement and expiation
