= Governmental theory of atonement =

Doctrine in Christian theology

The governmental theory of the atonement (also known as the rectoral theory, or the moral government theory) is a doctrine in Christian theology concerning the meaning and effect of the death of Jesus Christ. It teaches that Christ suffered for humanity so that God could forgive humans without punishing them while still maintaining divine justice. In the modern era, it is more often taught in non-Calvinist Protestant circles, though Arminius, John Wesley, and other Arminians never spoke clearly of it. It is drawn primarily from the works of Hugo Grotius and later theologians such as John Miley and H. Orton Wiley.

== Definition and terminology ==
=== Definition ===
Governmental theory holds that Christ's suffering was a real and meaningful substitute for the punishment humans deserve, but it did not consist of Christ's receiving the exact punishment due to sinful people. Instead, God publicly demonstrated his displeasure with sin through the suffering of his own sinless and obedient Son as a propitiation. Christ's suffering and death served as a substitute for the punishment humans might have received. On this basis, God is able to extend forgiveness while maintaining divine order, having demonstrated the seriousness of sin and thus allowing his wrath to "pass over."

=== Terminology ===
The governmental theory of the atonement is also known as the "rectoral theory" or "moral government theory".

== History ==
=== Origins ===
The governmental theory arose in opposition to Socinianism. Hugo Grotius (1583–1645) wrote Defensio fidei catholicae de satisfactione Christi (1617) [Defense of the universal faith on the satisfaction rendered by Christ], in which he utilized semantics drawn from his training in law and his general view of God as moral governor (ruler) of the universe. Grotius demonstrated that the atonement appeased God in the divine role as cosmic king and judge, and especially that God could not have simply overlooked sin as the Socinians claimed.

=== Developments ===
The original editions of the Defence was reprinted at Oxford in 1636; and the first translation was made in 1692. Grotius' theological writings were published in four folio volumes at London and Amsterdam in 1679. The Grotian theory was adopted in England by Samuel Clarke (1675–1729) and partially by Richard Baxter (1615–1691). Grotius' writings were also published at Basel in 1732. They were in Harvard College library in 1723 and Yale College library in 1733. Grotius' first work was translated into English by F. H. Foster, and published at Andover in 1889.

Variations of governmental theory of the atonement have been espoused in the New Divinity school of thought (a stage of the New England theology) by the followers of the Calvinist Jonathan Edwards (1703–1758). This view was possibly held by Edwards himself, although this is debated, and held by his son Jonathan Edwards (the younger). Revival leader Charles Grandison Finney's (1792–1875) theory of atonement is notably influenced by the governmental and the moral influence theories.

The governmental theory of the atonement prospered in 19th century Methodism, although John Wesley did not hold to it himself. John Wesley clearly held to the penal substitution view. This view has been notably detailed by Methodist theologian John Miley (1813–1895) in his Atonement in Christ and his Systematic Theology. It was also strongly held by William Booth and the Salvation Army.

The governmental theory of the atonement is also espoused by some Church of the Nazarene theologians, such as J. Kenneth Grider, Henry Orton Wiley, R. Larry Shelton, and H. Ray Dunning. If it is traditionally taught in Arminian circles, however, according to Roger Olson, it is incorrect to assert that all Arminians agree with this view because, as he states: "Arminius did not believe it, neither did Wesley nor some of his nineteenth-century followers. Nor do all contemporary Arminians".

== Characteristics ==
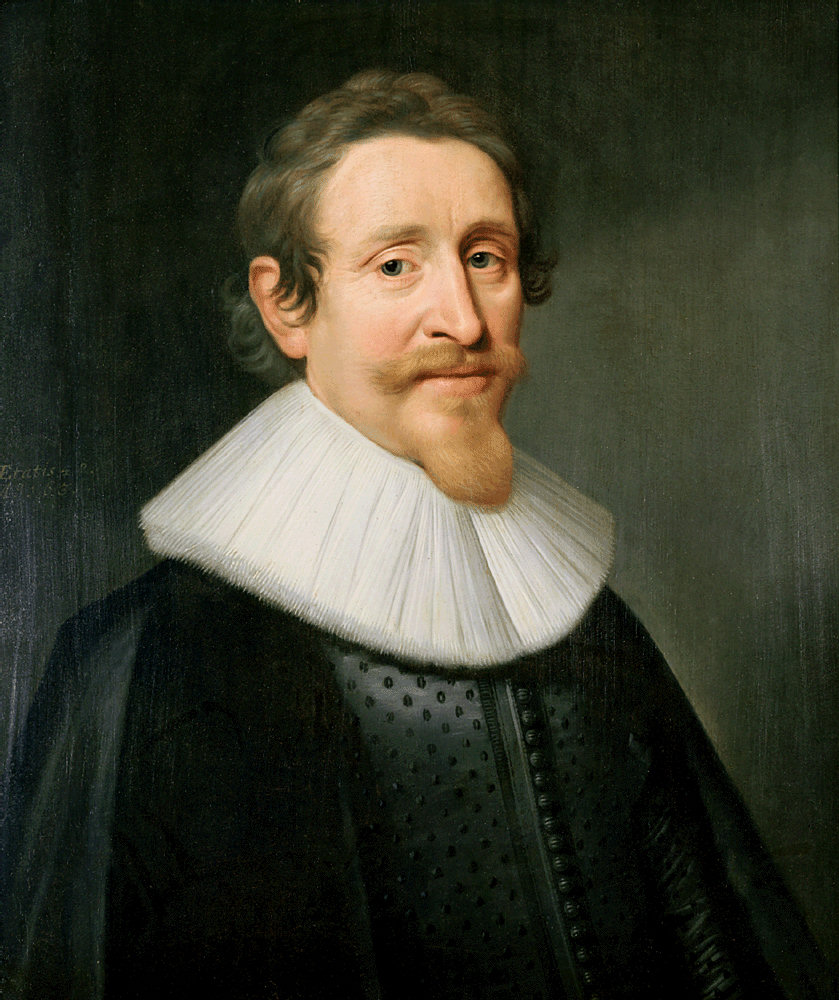
Portrait of Hugo Grotius by Michiel Jansz. van Mierevelt, 1631

- Remissibility of penalties: There is no sufficient reason why sin must be punished solely on the ground of its demerit. The forgiveness of the actual sinner, as a real remission of penalty at the time of his justification and acceptance in the divine favor, is proof positive to the contrary. Thus, in this theory, punishment is unnecessary.
- Substitutional provision: As penalties are remissible, having a special end in the interest of moral government, they may give place to any substitutional measure equally securing that end.
- Substitution by atonement: The sufferings of Christ are an atonement for sin by substitution, in the sense that they were intentionally endured for sinners under judicial condemnation, and for the sake of their forgiveness.
- Objective paradigm: Because Christ's atonement is substitutionary, the theory is based on an objective paradigm.
- Substitution in suffering: The substitution is in suffering without the penal element. A major presupposition is that a vicarious penal substitution is impossible. Miley states: "Nothing could be punished in Christ which was not transferred to Him, and in some real sense made His. Hence, if sin, with its demerit, could not [...] be put upon Christ by imputation, no punishment which He suffered fell upon such demerit, or intrinsic evil of sin."
- Christ's sufferings are an equivalent of men's punishment: The sufferings of Christ are to be regarded, not as the exact equivalent of men's punishment, but only in the sense that the dignity of the divine government was as effectively upheld and vindicated, as it would have been if men had received the deserved punishment.
- Unlimited scope of the substitution: According to governmental theory, Christ's death applies not to individuals directly, but to the Church as a corporate entity. In other words, Christ did not make a one-to-one substitution, but a general substitution. In this view, Christ's substitution can also be considered to be infinite, so that God could apply the substitution to an arbitrary, not pre-determined number of individuals and to their sins.
- Conditional substitution: The forgiveness of sin has a conditionality in its saving grace. Individuals then partake of the atonement through faith and can fall out of the scope of atonement through loss of faith.

== Comparison with other theories ==
=== General aspects ===
Governmental theory can not incorporate into itself the main elements of two major theories: a satisfaction theory of atonement and a penal substitution theory of atonement. However it can incorporate different understandings promoted in the other major atonement theories. It incorporates notably Peter Forsyth's emphasis on how the holiness of God figures in the atonement. It incorporates emphasis on Christ's ransoming humans as in the classical ransom theory of atonement. It incorporates the emphasis on God's love, which is the main point in the Abelardian moral influence theory of atonement. It includes the substitutionary aspect of the atonement.

=== Nature of the atonement ===
The governmental view is very similar to the satisfaction view and the penal substitution view, in that all three views see Christ as satisfying God's requirement for the punishment of sin. However, the governmental view disagrees with the other two in that it does not affirm that Christ endured the precise punishment that sin deserves or paid its sacrificial equivalent. Instead, Christ's suffering was simply an alternative to that punishment.

In contrast, penal substitution holds that Christ endured the exact punishment, or the exact "worth" of punishment, that sin deserved; the satisfaction theory states that Christ made the satisfaction owed by humans to God due to sin through the merit of His propitiatory sacrifice. These three views all acknowledge that God cannot freely forgive sins without any sort of punishment or satisfaction being exacted. By contrast, the Christus Victor view, states that Christ died not to fulfill God's requirements or to meet His needs or demands, but to cleanse humanity, restore the Image of God in humankind, and defeat the power of death over humans from within.

In the words of Gustaf Aulen, the satisfaction view (and, by extension, the governmental and penal views) maintain the order of justice while interrupting the continuity of the divine work, while the Christus Victor view interrupts the order of justice while maintaining the continuity of the divine work. He also draws a distinction between Christus Victor, wherein the atonement is "from above", from the side of God, and other views, where the work is offered up from the side of man.

=== Scope of the atonement ===
According to the governmental theory, the scope of the substitution is unlimited. Individuals then partake of the atonement through faith. Under this view, therefore, people can fall out of the scope of atonement through loss of faith. According to the penal substitution theory, Christ's death served as a substitute for the sins of individuals directly. Then, it may be argued that God would be unjust to punish them even if they did not come to faith. More specifically, it may be argued that the penal substitutionary theory would lead of necessity, either to universalism on the one hand, or unconditional election. This argument has been considered by some as a false dilemma. In particular, Roger Olson states that penal substitution is compatible with unlimited atonement, because through non-arbitrary basis of the faith, a person can simply refuse or accept Christ vicarious payment.

== Objections ==
Here are some objections to the theory:

- It does not attach sufficient importance to the idea of propitiation, and therefore minifies the idea of a real satisfaction of the divine attributes.
- It emphasizes the mercy of God in much the same sense that penal substitution emphasizes the justice of God. A true theory of the atonement must satisfy all the divine attributes.
- It is built upon a false philosophical principle that utility is the ground of moral obligation.
- It practically ignores the immanent holiness of God and substitutes, for the chief aim of the atonement, that which is only subordinate.

== See also ==
- Atonement in Christianity
- Atonement (ransom view)
- Atonement (satisfaction view)
- Atonement (moral influence view)
- Penal substitution
- Substitutionary atonement
- Christus Victor
- Justification (theology)
- Soteriology

== Notes and references ==
=== Sources ===
- Allen, David (2016). The Extent of the Atonement: A Historical and Critical Review. Nashville: B&H Academic.
- APC (2020). "The Governmental Theory of the Atonement". American Presbyterian Church.
- Aulén, Gustav (1969) [1931]. Christus Victor: An Historical Study of the Three Main Types of the Idea of Atonement. Translated by Herber, A. G. Macmillan.
- Booth, William (1892). The doctrines of the Salvation Army. Toronto: Territorial Headquarters.
- Erickson, Millard J. (2012). Christian Theology (3rd ed.). Grand Rapids: Baker Academic.
- Foster, Frank H. (1889). "Preface". A defence of the Catholic faith concerning the satisfaction of Christ against Faustus Socinus. Andover, MA: W. F. Draper.
- Grider, J. Kenneth (1994). "The Governmental Theory: An Expansion". A Wesleyan Holiness Theology. Kansas City, MO: Beacon Hill Press of Kansas City.
- Grotius, Hugo (1889). A defence of the Catholic faith concerning the satisfaction of Christ against Faustus Socinus (PDF). Andover, MA: W. F. Draper.
- Guelzo, Allen C (1989). Edwards on the Will. Wesleyan University Press.
- Noll, Mark A (2001). "New England Theology". Evangelical Dictionary of Theology. Toronto: Baker Academic.
- Miley, John (1879). The Atonement in Christ. New York: Eaton & Mains.
- Miley, John (1892). Systematic theology. Vol. 2. New York: Eaton & Mains.
- Romanides, John S. (1998). The Ancestral Sin. Ridgewood, NJ: Zephyr Publishing.
- Olson, Roger E. (2009). Arminian Theology: Myths and Realities. Downers Grove: InterVarsity Press.
- Olson, Roger E. (2013). "What's Wrong with Calvinism?". Roger E. Olson: My evangelical, Arminian theological musings. Patheos.
- Olson, Roger E. (2017). "A Neglected Theory of the Atonement? (The "Governmental Theory")". Roger E. Olson: My evangelical, Arminian theological musings. Patheos.
- Park, Edwards A. (1859). The Atonement. Boston: Congregational Board of Publication.
- Shultz, Gary L. (2014). A Multi-Intentioned View of the Extent of the Atonement. Eugene, OR: Wipf and Stock Publishers.
- Todd, Obbie Tyler (2020). "Rethinking Finney: The Two Sides of Charles Grandison Finney's Doctrine of Atonement" (PDF). JETS. 63 (2): 332–43. Archived from the original (PDF) on 2022-08-05.
- Todd, Obbie Tyler (2021). The Moral Governmental Theory of Atonement: Re-envisioning Penal Substitution. Downers Grove: Wipf and Stock Publishers.
- Wiley, H. Orton (1940). "XXIII. The Atonement: Its Biblical Basis and History". Christian theology. Vol. 2. Kansas City, MO: Beacon Hill Press. pp. 217–270.
- Wood, Darren Cushman (2007). "John Wesley's Use of the Atonement". The Asbury Journal. 62 (2): 55–70.
