= Substitutionary atonement =

Postulation about the significance of Christ's death

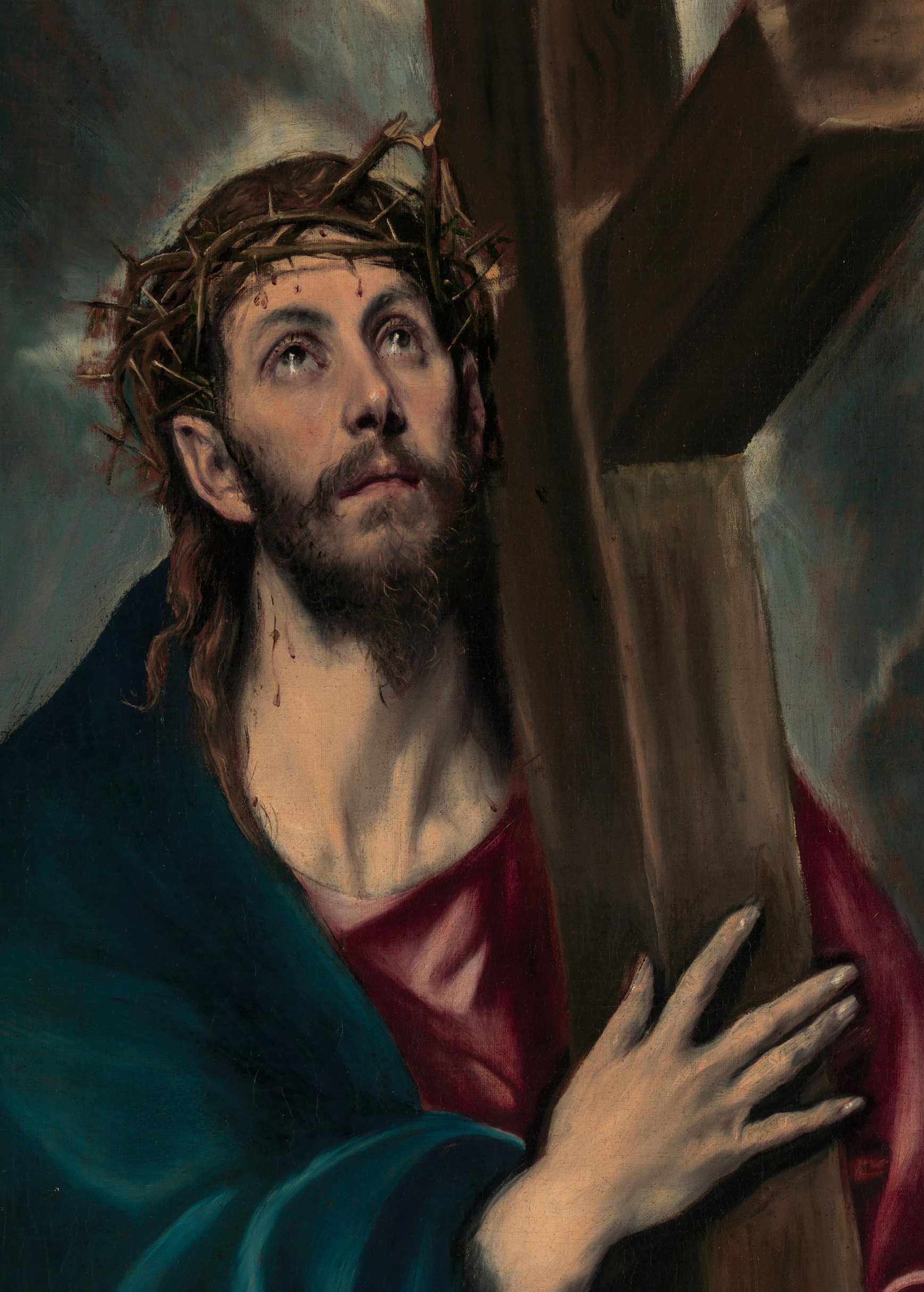
El Greco's Jesus Carrying the Cross, 1580.

Substitutionary atonement, also called vicarious atonement, is a central concept within Western Christian theology which asserts that Jesus died for humanity, as claimed by the Western classic and objective paradigms of atonement in Christianity, which regard Jesus as dying as a substitute for others.

Substitutionary atonement has been explicated in the "classic paradigm" of the Early Church Fathers, namely the ransom theory, as well as in Gustaf Aulen's demystified reformulation, the Christus Victor theory; (Note: According to Yeo, the "ransom theory [...] views salvation based on the vicarious atonement of Jesus (Isa. 53:10, "an offering for sin"; Rom. 3:22-25; Heb. 10:12; Mark 10:45) and thus understands Jesus as the Victor [...] over enemies such as chaos, darkness, the Devil, or sin and death." Pate differentiates the "Christ the Victor"-theme from the "vicarious atonement"-theme, both of which can be found in early Christianity.) and in the "objective paradigm," which includes Anselm of Canterbury's satisfaction theory, the Reformed period's penal substitution theory, and the Governmental theory of atonement. (Note: Governmental theory: Gridder: "The governmental theory is also substitutionary. According to this theory, what Christ did became a substitute for something else that would otherwise occur [...] But there is substitution also in the governmental theory--substitution of a different sort. Here there is a double-dimension substitution. There is substitution in the sense that something Christ did substituted for something that would have been required of the finally impenitent. But then, there is a substitution of the guiltless Christ's suffering for the punishment that those who repent and believe would have received in eternal hell."; Pugh notes that the Governmental Theory has been called "penal non-substitution.")

== Definition ==
Substitutionary atonement, also called vicarious atonement, is the idea that Jesus died "for us". There is also a less technical use of the term "substitution" in discussion about atonement when it is used in "the sense that [Jesus, through his death,] did for us that which we can never do for ourselves". (Note: Vincent Taylor, The Cross of Christ (London: Macmillan & Co, 1956), p. 31. Compare J. I. Packer: "It would ... clarify discussion if all who hold that Jesus by dying did something for us which we needed to do but could not, would agree that they are regarding Christ’s death as substitutionary, and differing only on the nature of the action which Jesus performed in our place and also, perhaps, on the way we enter into the benefit that flows from it." ("What did the Cross Achieve? The Logic of Penal Substitution" [1973]))

The English word atonement originally meant "at-one-ment", i.e. being "at one", in harmony, with someone. According to Collins English Dictionary, it is used to describe the redemption through Jesus' death and resurrection, to reconcile the world to himself, and also of the state of a person having been reconciled to God. (Note: Collins English Dictionary, Complete & Unabridged 11th Edition, atonement, retrieved October 03, 2012: "2. (often capital) Christian theol a. the reconciliation of man with God through the life, sufferings, and sacrificial death of Christ b. the sufferings and death of Christ")

The word "atonement" is often used in the Old Testament to translate the Hebrew words kipper and kippurim, which mean 'propitiation' or 'expiation'. The word occurs in the KJV in Romans 5:11 and has the basic meaning of reconciliation. In the Old Testament (Hebrew Bible or Tanakh), atonement was accomplished by the sacrifice of specified animals such as lambs to pay for one's sins.

A distinction has to be made between substitutionary atonement (Christ suffers for us), and penal substitution (Christ punished instead of us), which is a subset or particular type of substitutionary atonement. Care should be taken when one reads the language of substitution in, for example, patristic literature, not to assume any particular substitution model is being used but should, rather, check the context to see how the author was using the language. (Note: Context: D. Flood, "Substitutionary atonement and the Church Fathers" in Evangelical Quarterly 82.2 (2010), p. 143: "It is not enough to simply identify substitutionary or even penal themes in the writings of the church fathers, and assume that this is an endorsement of the Reformed understanding of penal substitution. Instead, one must look at how a patristic author is using these concepts within their own understanding of the atonement and ask: what salvic purpose does Christ bearing our suffering, sin, and death have for this author? Rather than simply 'proof-texting' we need to seek to understand how these statements fit into the larger thought-world of an author. In short, it is a matter of context."; J. K. Mozley, The doctrine of the atonement (New York: Charles Scribner's Sons, 1916), p. 94–95: "The same or similar words may point to the same or similar ideas; but not necessarily so, since a word which has been at one time the expression of one idea, may, to a less or greater extent, alter its meaning under the influence of another idea. Hence it follows that the preservation of a word does not, as a matter of course, involve the preservation of the idea which the word was originally intended to convey. In such respects no doctrine demands more careful treatment than that of the Atonement.")

== Origins ==
=== Jewish scriptures ===
According to Pate, the Jewish scriptures describe three types of vicarious atonement: the Paschal Lamb although the Paschal Lamb was not a sin offering; "the sacrificial system as a whole", although these were for "mistakes", not intentional sins and with the Day of Atonement as the most essential element; and the idea of the suffering servant (Isaiah 42:1-9, 49:1-6, 50:4-11, 52:13-53:12). The Old Testament Deuterocanon added a fourth idea, namely the righteous martyr (2 Maccabees, 4 Maccabees, Wisdom 2-5).

These traditions of atonement offer only temporary forgiveness, and korbanot (offerings) could only be used as a means of atoning for the lightest type of sin, that is sins committed in ignorance that the thing was a sin. (Note: Sins in Judaism consist of different grades of severity: (Note: Jewish Encyclopedia, SIN): The lightest is the ḥeṭ, ḥaṭṭa'ah, or ḥaṭṭat (lit. "fault," "shortcoming," "misstep"), an infraction of a commandment committed in ignorance of the existence or meaning of that command.; The second kind is the awon, a breach of a minor commandment committed with a full knowledge of the existence and nature of that commandment (bemezid).; The gravest kind is the pesha or mered, a presumptuous and rebellious act against God. Its worst form is the resha, such an act committed with a wicked intention.) (Note: According to the Jewish Encyclopedia (1906), "The Mishnah says that sins are expiated (1) by sacrifice, (2) by repentance at death or on Yom Kippur, (3) in the case of the lighter transgressions of the positive or negative precepts, by repentance at any time [...] The graver sins, according to Rabbi, are apostasy, heretical interpretation of the Torah, and non-circumcision (Yoma 86a). The atonement for sins between a man and his neighbor is an ample apology (Yoma 85b)." The Jewish Encyclopedia further writes: "Most efficacious seemed to be the atoning power of suffering experienced by the righteous during the Exile. This is the idea underlying the description of the suffering servant of God in Isa. liii. 4, 12, Hebr. [...] of greater atoning power than all the Temple sacrifices was the suffering of the elect ones who were to be servants and witnesses of the Lord (Isa. xlii. 1-4, xlix. 1-7, l. 6). This idea of the atoning power of the suffering and death of the righteous finds expression also in IV Macc. vi. 27, xvii. 21-23; M. Ḳ. 28a; Pesiḳ. xxvii. 174b; Lev. R. xx.; and formed the basis of Paul's doctrine of the atoning blood of Christ (Rom. iii. 25)." (Note: Jewish Encyclopedia (1906), ATONEMENT)) In addition, korbanot have no expiating effect unless the person making the offering sincerely repents his or her actions before making the offering, and makes restitution to any person who was harmed by the violation. Marcus Borg notes that animal sacrifice in Second Temple Judaism was not a "payment for sin," but had a basic meaning as "making something sacred by giving it as a gift to God," and included a shared meal with God. Sacrifices had numerous purposes, namely thanksgiving, petition, purification, and reconciliation. None of them were a "payment or substitution or satisfaction," and even "sacrifices of reconciliation were about restoring the relationship."

The idea that Jesus was predicted by Isaiah is attested in Luke 4:16-22, where Jesus is portrayed as saying that the prophesies in Isaiah were about him. (Note: Luke 4:16–22: "And He came to Nazareth, where He had been brought up; and as was His custom, He entered the synagogue on the Sabbath, and stood up to read. And the book of the prophet Isaiah was handed to Him. And He opened the book and found the place where it was written, 'THE SPIRIT OF THE LORD IS UPON ME, BECAUSE HE ANOINTED ME TO PREACH THE GOSPEL TO THE POOR. HE HAS SENT ME TO PROCLAIM RELEASE TO THE CAPTIVES, AND RECOVERY OF SIGHT TO THE BLIND, TO SET FREE THOSE WHO ARE OPPRESSED, TO PROCLAIM THE FAVORABLE YEAR OF THE LORD.' And He closed the book, gave it back to the attendant and sat down; and the eyes of all in the synagogue were fixed on Him. And He began to say to them, 'Today this Scripture has been fulfilled in your hearing.'") In Luke 22:37 he refers Isaiah 53 to himself, and the Gospel of Matthew also applies that chapter to him (Matthew 8:16–18).

James F. McGrath refers to 4 Maccabees 6, "which presents a martyr praying “Be merciful to your people, and let our punishment suffice for them. Make my blood their purification, and take my life in exchange for theirs” (4 Maccabees 6:28-29). Clearly there were ideas that existed in the Judaism of the time that helped make sense of the death of the righteous in terms of atonement."

=== Paul ===
1 Corinthians 15:3–8 contains the kerygma of the early Christians:

[3] For I handed on to you as of first importance what I in turn had received: that Christ died for our sins in accordance with the scriptures, [4] and that he was buried, and that he was raised on the third day in accordance with the scriptures, (Note: See Why was Resurrection on “the Third Day”? Two Insights for explanations on the phrase "third day." According to Ernst Lüdemann and Pinchas Lapide, "third day" may refer to Hosea 6:1–2: "Come, let us return to the Lord; for he has torn us, that he may heal us; he has struck us down, and he will bind us up. After two days he will revive us; on the third day he will raise us up, that we may live before him." See also 2 Kings 20:8: "Hezekiah said to Isaiah, “What shall be the sign that the Lord will heal me, and that I shall go up to the house of the Lord on the third day?”" According to Sheehan, Paul's reference to Jesus having risen "on the third day [...] simply expresses the belief that Jesus was rescued from the fate of utter absence from God (death) and was admitted to the saving presence of God (the eschatological future).") [5] and that he appeared to Cephas, then to the twelve. [6] Then he appeared to more than five hundred brothers and sisters at one time, most of whom are still alive, though some have died. [7] Then he appeared to James, then to all the apostles. [8] Last of all, as to one untimely born, he appeared also to me.

The meaning of this kerygma is a matter of debate, and open to multiple interpretations. Traditionally, this kerygma is interpreted as meaning that Jesus' death was an atonement or ransom for, or propitiation or expiation of, God's wrath against humanity because of their sins. With Jesus' death, humanity was freed from this wrath. (Note: David G. Peterson (2009), Atonement in Paul's writing) (Note: Atonement: Briscoe and Ogilvie (2003): "Paul says that Christ's ransom price is his blood." * Cobb: "The question is whether Paul thought that God sacrificed Jesus to atone for human sins. During the past thousand years, this idea has often been viewed in the Western church as at the heart of Christianity, and many of those who uphold it have appealed to Paul as its basis [...] In fact, the word "atonement" is lacking in many standard translations. The King James Translation uses "propitiation", and the Revised Standard Version uses "expiation." The American Translation reads: "For God showed him publicly dying as a sacrifice of reconciliation to be taken advantage of through faith." The Good News Bible renders the meaning as: "God offered him, so that by his sacrificial death he should become the means by which people's sins are forgiven through their faith in him." Despite this variety, and the common avoidance of the word "atonement," all these translations agree with the New Revised Standard Version in suggesting that God sacrificed Jesus so that people could be reconciled to God through faith. All thereby support the idea that is most directly formulated by the use of the word "atonement." (Note: John B. Cobb, Did Paul Teach the Doctrine of the Atonement?)) In the classical Protestant understanding humans partake in this salvation by faith in Jesus Christ; this faith is a grace given by God, and people are justified by God through Jesus Christ and faith in Him.

More recent scholarship has raised several concerns regarding these interpretations. The traditional interpretation sees Paul's understanding of salvation as involving "an exposition of the individual's relation to God." According to Krister Stendahl, the main concern of Paul's writings on Jesus' role, and salvation by faith, is not the individual conscience of human sinners, and their doubts about being chosen by God or not, but the problem of the inclusion of Gentile (Greek) Torah observers into God's covenant. (Note: Dunn quotes Stendahl: "Cf Stendahl, Paul among Jews and Gentiles, passim-e.g "... a doctrine of faith was hammered out by Paul for the very specific and limited purpose of defending the rights of Gentile converts to be full and genuine heirs to the promise of God to Israel"(p.2)" Stephen Westerholm: "For Paul, the question that “justification by faith” was intended to answer was, “On what terms can Gentiles gain entrance to the people of God?” Bent on denying any suggestion that Gentiles must become Jews and keep the Jewish law, he answered, “By faith—and not by works of the (Jewish) law.”" Westerholm refers to: Krister Stendahl, The Apostle Paul and the Introspective Conscience of the West, Harvard Theological Review 56 (1963), 199–215; reprinted in Stendahl, Paul Among Jews and Gentiles and Other Essays (Philadelphia: Fortress, 1976), 78–96. Westerholm quotes Sanders: "Sanders noted that “the salvation of the Gentiles is essential to Paul’s preaching; and with it falls the law; for, as Paul says simply, Gentiles cannot live by the law (Gal. 2.14)” (496). On a similar note, Sanders suggested that the only Jewish "boasting" to which Paul objected was that which exulted over the divine privileges granted to Israel and failed to acknowledge that God, in Christ, had opened the door of salvation to Gentiles.") Paul draws on several interpretative frames to solve this problem, but most importantly, his own experience and understanding.

The kerygma from 1:Cor.15:3-5 refers to two mythologies: the Greek myth of the noble dead, to which the Maccabean notion of martyrdom and dying for ones people is related; and the Jewish myth of the persecuted sage or righteous man, in particular the "story of the child of wisdom." The notion of 'dying for' refers to this martyrdom and persecution. 'Dying for our sins' refers to the problem of Gentile Torah-observers, who, despite their faithfulness, cannot fully observe commandments, including circumcision, and are therefore 'sinners', excluded from God's covenant. In the Jerusalem ekklēsia, from which Paul received this creed, the phrase "died for our sins" probably was an apologetic rationale for the death of Jesus as being part of God's plan and purpose, as evidenced in the scriptures. For Paul, it gained a deeper significance, providing "a basis for the salvation of sinful Gentiles apart from the Torah." Jesus' death and resurrection solved this problem of the exclusion of the Gentiles from God's covenant, as indicated by Rom 3:21–26.

== Substitutionary atonement theories ==
=== Theories of atonement ===
A number of metaphors and Old Testament terms and references have been used in the New Testament writings to understand the person (Note: Matt Stefon, Hans J. Hillerbrand, Christology, Encyclopedia Britannica) (Note: The earliest Christian writings give several titles to Jesus, such as Son of Man, Son of God, Messiah, and Kyrios, which were all derived from the Hebrew scriptures.) and death of Jesus. Starting in the second century CE, various theories of atonement have been posited to explain the death of Jesus, and the metaphors applied by the New Testament to understand his death. Over the centuries, Christians have held different ideas about how Jesus saved people, and different views still exist within different Christian denominations.

According to C. Marvin Pate, "there are three aspects to Christ's atonement according to the early Church: vicarious atonement [substitutionary atonement], (Note: In Christianity, vicarious atonement, also called substitutionary atonement, is the idea that Jesus died "for us.") the escatological defeat of Satan [Christ the Victor], and the imitation of Christ [participation in Jesus' death and resurrection]." Pate further notes that these three aspects were intertwined in the earliest Christian writings, but that this intertwining was lost since the Patristic times. Due to the influence of Gustaf Aulèn's (1879-1977) Christus Victor, the various theories or paradigms of atonement which developed after the New Testamentical writings are often grouped as "classic paradigm," "objective paradigm," and the "subjective paradigm": (Note: Karl Barth notes a range of alternative themes: forensic (we are guilty of a crime, and Christ takes the punishment), financial (we are indebted to God, and Christ pays our debt) and cultic (Christ makes a sacrifice on our behalf). For various cultural reasons, the oldest themes (honor and sacrifice) prove to have more depth than the more modern ones (payment of a debt, punishment for a crime). But in all these alternatives, the understanding of atonement has the same structure. Human beings owe something to God that we cannot pay. Christ pays it on our behalf. Thus God remains both perfectly just (insisting on a penalty) and perfectly loving (paying the penalty himself). A great many Christians would define such a substitutionary view of the atonement as simply part of what orthodox Christians believe.)

Substitutionary atonement has been explicated in the "classic paradigm" of the Early Church Fathers, namely the ransom theory, as well as in Gustaf Aulen's demystified reformulation, the Christus Victor theory; and in the "objective paradigm," which includes Anselm of Canterbury's satisfaction theory, (Note: Pate: "Anselm's theory does not yet factor in the substitutionary nature of Christ's death.") the Reformed period's penal substitution theory, and the Governmental theory of atonement.

=== Classic paradigm ===
According to Yeo, the

ransom theory [...] views salvation based on the vicarious atonement of Jesus (Isa. 53:10, "an offering for sin"; Rom. 3:22-25; Heb. 10:12; Mark 10:45) and thus understands Jesus as the Victor [...] over enemies such as chaos, darkness, the Devil, or sin and death.

Pate differentiates the "Christ the Victor"-theme from the "vicarious atonement"-theme, both of which can be found in early Christianity.

The ransom theory presents Jesus as dying to overcome (supernatural) powers of sin and evil. In this model, the Devil has ownership over humanity (because they have sinned) so Jesus dies in their place to free them. The doctrine is that Jesus gave himself as a ransom sacrifice on behalf of the people. This is known as the oldest of the theories of the atonement, (Note: Oldest theory: Gustaf Aulen, Christus Victor (1931) (London: SPCK), p.143: 'The history of the doctrine of the Atonement is a history of three types of view, which emerge in turn. The classic idea emerges with Christianity itself, and remains the dominant type for of teaching for a thousand years.; Vincent Taylor, The Cross of Christ (London: Macmillan & Co, 1956), p. 71-2: '...the four main types, which have persisted throughout the centuries. The oldest theory is the Ransom Theory...It held sway for a thousand years.) and is, in some form, still, along with the doctrine of theosis, the Eastern Orthodox Church's main theory of the atonement.

Many of the Church Fathers, including Justin Martyr, Athanasius and Augustine incorporate the ransom theory of atonement into their writings. The specific interpretation as to what this suffering for sinners meant differed to some extent. It is widely held that the early Church Fathers, including Athanasius and Augustine, taught that through Christ's vicarious suffering in humanity's place, he overcame and liberated humanity from sin, death, and the Devil.

Gustaf Aulén reinterpreted the ransom theory in his study Christus Victor (1931), calling it the Christus Victor doctrine, arguing that Christ's death was not a payment to the Devil (Satan), but defeated the powers of evil, particularly Satan, which had held humankind in their dominion. According to Ben Pugh, "Ever since [Aulén's] time, we call these patristic ideas the Christus Victor way of seeing the cross."

=== Objective paradigm ===
While the idea of substitutionary atonement is present in nearly all atonement theories, some argue that the specific ideas of satisfaction and penal substitution are later developments in the Catholic church and in Calvinism, respectively. Both Anselm's satisfaction theory and the penal satisfaction theory hold that human beings cannot rightfully repay the debt (to God's honour [Anselm], or to God's justice [penal substitution]) which was incurred through their willful disobedience to God. Since only God can make the satisfaction necessary to repay it, rather than merely forgiving humanity, God sent the God-man, Jesus Christ, to fulfill both these conditions. Christ is a sacrifice by God on behalf of humanity, taking humanity's debt for sin upon himself, and propitiating God's wrath. The penal substitution theory has been rejected by liberal Christians as un-Biblical, and an offense to the love of God. According to Richard Rohr, "[t]hese theories are based on retributive justice rather than the restorative justice that the prophets and Jesus taught."

The Governmental theory, introduced by Hugo Grotius (17th century), states that Christ suffered for humanity so that God could forgive humans without punishing them while still maintaining divine justice. Jesus' death demonstrated God's hatred of sin, (Note: Dean Harvey: "[God] needed to do something that would demonstrate His justice, that He hated sin as much as when He had pronounced the penalty, and loved obedience because it was the way of duplicating His character in this world." (Note: Dean Harvey, The Atonement)) and thus God's law (his rule, his government) is upheld (people see that sin is serious and will lead to death), and God forgives people who recognise this and respond through repentance. The governmental theory rejects the notion of penal substitution, (Note: Gridder: "Whereas Calvinists boldly teach that Christ paid the penalty for us--that He took our punishment--and believe their view to be Biblical, it is altogether opposed to the teaching of Scripture.") but is still substitutionary itself in that Christ, in his exemplary sufferings, substituted for believers and the punishment they would otherwise receive.

=== Other substitutionary models ===
There are a number of other substitutionary theories of the atonement besides the four described above. A few are listed below:

- John McLeod Campbell (The nature of the Atonement [1856]): 'Campbell rejects the idea of vicarious punishment [...And] Taking a hint from Jonathan Edwards, ... develops the idea that Christ, as representative and complete man, was able to offer a vicarious repentance to God for men.'
- Horace Bushnell (The Vicarious Sacrifice [1866]): Bushnell rejected penal substitution and, instead, speaks of Christ as 'my sacrifice, who opens all to me'. 'Beholding Him with all my sin upon Him', he says, 'I count Him my offering....'
- Vincent Taylor (The Cross of Christ [1956]): '...in St. Paul's teaching Christ's death is substitutionary in the sense that He did for us that which we can never do for ourselves, but not in the sense that He transfers our punishment to Himself...' (p. 31). While rejecting as pagan the notion that Jesus' death propitiates the Father (p. 91), he talks of Jesus' sacrifice as vicarious, representative and sacrificial (p. 90), and says that for Jesus 'sacrifice is a representative offering in which men can share, making it the vehicle or organ of their approach to God' (p. 21). Taylor called this theory the 'Sacrificial Theory' (p. 104).
- F. W. Camfield (‘The Idea of Substitution in the Doctrine of the Atonement’ in SJT I [1948] 282-293): in his 1948 paper, Camfield spells out 'a non-penal view of substitution'.

== Belief in substitutionary atonement ==
Eastern Christians do not incorporate substitutionary atonement in their doctrine of the cross and resurrection. The Western part of the Catholic Church incorporates it into Aquinas' satisfaction doctrine rooted in the idea of penance. Most Evangelical Protestants interpret it largely in terms of penal substitution.

== See also ==
- Acts of Reparation to Jesus Christ
- Supersessionism
- Altruistic suicide

== Sources ==
Printed sources

- Baker, Mark D. (2006), Proclaiming the Scandal of the Cross: Contemporary Images of the Atonement, Baker Academic
- Beilby, James K.; Eddy, Paul R. (2009), The Nature of the Atonement: Four Views, InterVarsity Press
- Briscoe, D. Stuatt; Ogilvie, Lloyd J. (2003), The Preacher's Commentary: Romans Vol. 29, Thomas Nelson
- Brown, Raymond Edward (1994). An Introduction to New Testament Christology. Paulist Press. ISBN 978-0-8091-3516-5.
- Dunn, James D.G. (1982), The New Perspective on Paul. Manson Memorial Lecture, 4 november 1982
- Finlan, Stephen (2004), The Background and Content of Paul's Cultic Atonement Metaphors, Society of Biblical Literature
- Flood, Derek (2012), Healing the Gospel: A Radical Vision for Grace, Justice, and the Cross, Wipf and Stock Publishers
- Hurtado, Larry (2005), Lord Jesus Christ. Devotion to Jesus in Earliest Christianity, Eerdmans
- Karkkainen, Veli-Matti (2016), Christology. A Global Introduction, BakerAcademic
- Lüdemann, Gerd; Özen, Alf, De opstanding van Jezus. Een historische benadering (Was mit Jesus wirklich geschah. Die Auferstehung historisch betrachtet / The Resurrection of Christ: A Historical Inquiry), The Have/Averbode
- Mack, Burton L. (1995) [1995], Who Wrote the New Testament? The Making of the Christian Myth
- Mack, Burton L. (1997) [1995], Wie schreven het Nieuwe Testament werkelijk? Feiten, mythen en motieven. (Who Wrote the New Testament? The Making of the Christian Myth), Uitgeverij Ankh-Hermes bv
- Pate, C. Marvin (2011), From Plato to Jesus: What Does Philosophy Have to Do with Theology?, Kregel Academic
- Pugh, Ben (2015), Atonement Theories: A Way through the Maze, James Clarke & Co
- Sheehan, Thomas (1986), The First Coming: How the Kingdom of God Became Christianity, Random House, ISBN 978-0394511986
- Stendahl, Krister (1963), "The Apostle Paul and the Introspective Conscience of the West" (PDF), The Harvard Theological Review, 56 (3): 199–215, doi:10.1017/S0017816000024779, S2CID 170331485
- Stubs, David L. (2008), "The shape of soteriology and the pistis Christou debate", Scottish Journal of Theology, 61 (2): 137–157, doi:10.1017/S003693060800392X, S2CID 170575588
- Weaver, J. Denny (2001), The Nonviolent Atonement, Wm. B. Eerdmans Publishing
- Yeo, Khiok-Khng (2017), "INTRODUCTION: So Great a Salvation: Soteriology in the Majority World", in Green, Gene L.; Pardue, Stephen T.; Yeo, Khiok-Khng (eds.), So Great a Salvation: Soteriology in the Majority World, Wm. B. Eerdmans Publishing

Web sources
