= Horace Bushnell =

American theologian

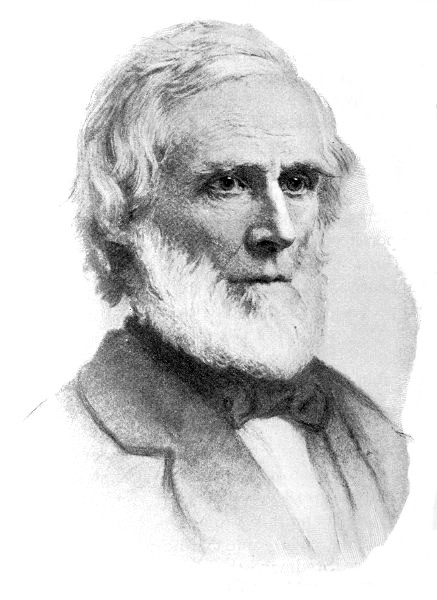
Horace Bushnell

Horace Bushnell (April 14, 1802 – February 17, 1876) was an American Congregational minister and theologian. He had a marked influence upon theology in America, and wrote various books on religion. He was also a graduate from Yale Divinity School.

== Life ==
Bushnell was born in the village of Bantam, township of Litchfield, Connecticut. He attended Yale College where he roomed with future magazinist Nathaniel Parker Willis. Willis credited Bushnell with teaching him the proper technique for sharpening a razor. After graduating in 1827, he was literary editor of the New York Journal of Commerce from 1828–1829, and in 1829 became a tutor at Yale. Here he initially studied law, but in 1831 he entered the theology department of Yale College.

In May, 1833 Bushnell was ordained pastor of the North Congregational church in Hartford, Connecticut. He married Mary Apthorp in 1833 and the couple had three children. Bushnell remained in Hartford until 1859 when, due to extended poor health he resigned his pastorate. Thereafter he held no appointed office, but, until his death at Hartford in 1876, he was a prolific author and occasionally preached.

== Career ==
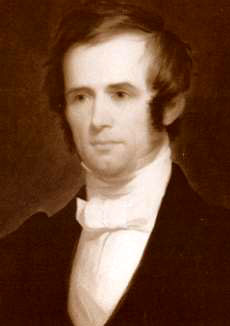
A younger Horace Bushnell

While in California in 1856, for the restoration of his health, he took an active interest in the organization, at Oakland, of the College of California (chartered in 1855 and merged with the University of California in 1869), the presidency of which he declined. As a preacher, Dr. Bushnell was very effective. Though not a dramatic orator, he was original, thoughtful and impressive in the pulpit. His theological position may be said to have been one of qualified revolt against the Calvinistic orthodoxy of his day.

He criticized prevailing conceptions of the Trinity, the atonement, conversion, and the relations of the natural and the supernatural. Above all, he broke with the prevalent view which regarded theology as essentially intellectual in its appeal and demonstrable by processes of exact logical deduction. To his thinking its proper basis is to be found in the feelings and intuitions of humankind's spiritual nature. He had a marked influence upon theology in America, an influence not so much, possibly, in the direction of the modification of specific doctrines as in the impulse and tendency and general spirit which he imparted to theological thought.

Dr. Munger's estimate was that "He was a theologian as Copernicus was an astronomer; he changed the point of view, and thus not only changed everything, but pointed the way toward unity in theological thought. He was not exact, but he put God and humanity and the world into a relation that thought can accept while it goes on to state it more fully with ever growing knowledge. Other thinkers were moving in the same direction; he led the movement in New England, and wrought out a great deliverance. It was a work of superb courage. Hardly a theologian in his denomination stood by him, and nearly all pronounced against him."

Four of his books were of particular importance: Christian Nurture (1847), in which he virtually opposed revivalism and effectively turned the current of Christian thought toward the young; Nature and the Supernatural (1858), in which he discussed miracles and endeavoured to lift the natural into the supernatural by emphasizing the supernatural nature of man; The Vicarious Sacrifice (1866), in which he contended for what has come to be known as the moral view of the atonement in distinction from the governmental and the penal or satisfaction theories; and God in Christ (1849) (with an introductory Dissertation on Language as related to Thought and Spirit), in which he expressed, it was charged, heretical views as to the Trinity, holding, among other things, that the Godhead is "instrumentally three—three simply as related to our finite apprehension, and the communication of God's incommunicable nature."

Attempts were made to bring him to trial, but they were unsuccessful, and in 1852 his church unanimously withdrew from the local consociation, thus removing any possibility of further action against him. To his critics Bushnell formally replied by writing Christ in Theology (1851), in which he employs the important argument that spiritual truth can be expressed only in approximate and poetical language, and concludes that an adequate dogmatic theology cannot exist. That he did not deny the divinity of Christ he proved in The Character of Jesus, forbidding his possible Classification within Men (1861). He also published Sermons for the New Life (1858); Christ and his Salvation (1864); Work and Play (1864); Moral Uses of Dark Things (1868); Women's Suffrage; The Reform Against Nature (1869); Sermons on Living Subjects (1872); and Forgiveness and Law (1874).

An edition of his works, in eleven volumes, appeared in 1876; and a further volume, gathered from his unpublished papers, as The Spirit in Man: Sermons and Selections, in 1903. New editions of his Nature and the Supernatural, Sermons for this New Life, and Work and Play, were published the same year.

== Memorials ==
Bushnell was greatly interested in the civic interests of Hartford, and was the chief agent in procuring the establishment of the first public park in the United States. It was named Bushnell Park in his honor by that city.

The Bushnell Center for the Performing Arts, and a residence hall at the University of Hartford are also named for him.

== Books ==
- Views of Christian Nurture, and of Subjects Adjacent Thereto (1847), Facsimile ed., 1876 ed., 1975, Scholars Facsimiles & Reprints, ISBN 978-0-8201-1147-6: text online
- God in Christ: Three Discourses Delivered at New Haven, Cambridge, & Andover (1849), University of Michigan Library, 2005, ISBN 1-4255-3727-8, 1876 edition: text online, includes a preliminary dissertation arguing that language is inadequate to express things of the spirit.
- Sermons for the New Life (1858), New York: Charles Scribner, text online
- Nature and the Supernatural: As Together Constituting the One System of God (1858), University of Michigan Library, 2006, ISBN 1-4255-5865-8, 1860 edition: text online
- Parting Words: A Discourse Delivered in the North Church, Hartford (1859), Hartford: L.E. Hunt, text online
- Christ and His Salvation (1864), New York: Charles Scribner, text online
- The Vicarious Sacrifice, Grounded in Principles of Universal Obligation (1866), University of Michigan Library, 2001, ISBN 1-4181-5431-8, 1871 edition: text online
- Moral Uses of Dark Things (1869), London : Strahan & Co., Sampson Low, Son & Marston.
- Sermons on Living Subjects (1872), New York: Scribner, Armstrong, and Co., text online
- Forgiveness and Law: Grounded in Principles Interpreted by Human Analogies (1874), New York: Scribner, Armstrong, and Co., text online
- Horace Bushnell, Selected Writings on Language, Religion, and American Culture, David L. Smith, ed., Scholars Press, 1984, ISBN 0-89130-636-6
- Horace Bushnell: Sermons, Conrad Cherry, ed., Paulist Press, 1985. ISBN 0-8091-0362-1
- Women’s Suffrage; The Reform Against Nature (1869), New York: Charles Scribner and Co.
