= Condign =

Condign may refer to:

- Condign merit, an aspect of Roman Catholic theology signifying a goodness that has been bestowed because of the actions of that person
- Project Condign, a top-secret UFO study undertaken by the British government between 1997 and 2000
