= Enoch Fitch Burr =

American theologian, astronomer and author

Enoch Fitch Burr (October 21, 1818 – May 8, 1907) was an American theologian, astronomer, and author who lectured extensively on the relationship between science and religion. His books included sermons, essays, verse, and fiction.

== Education and career ==
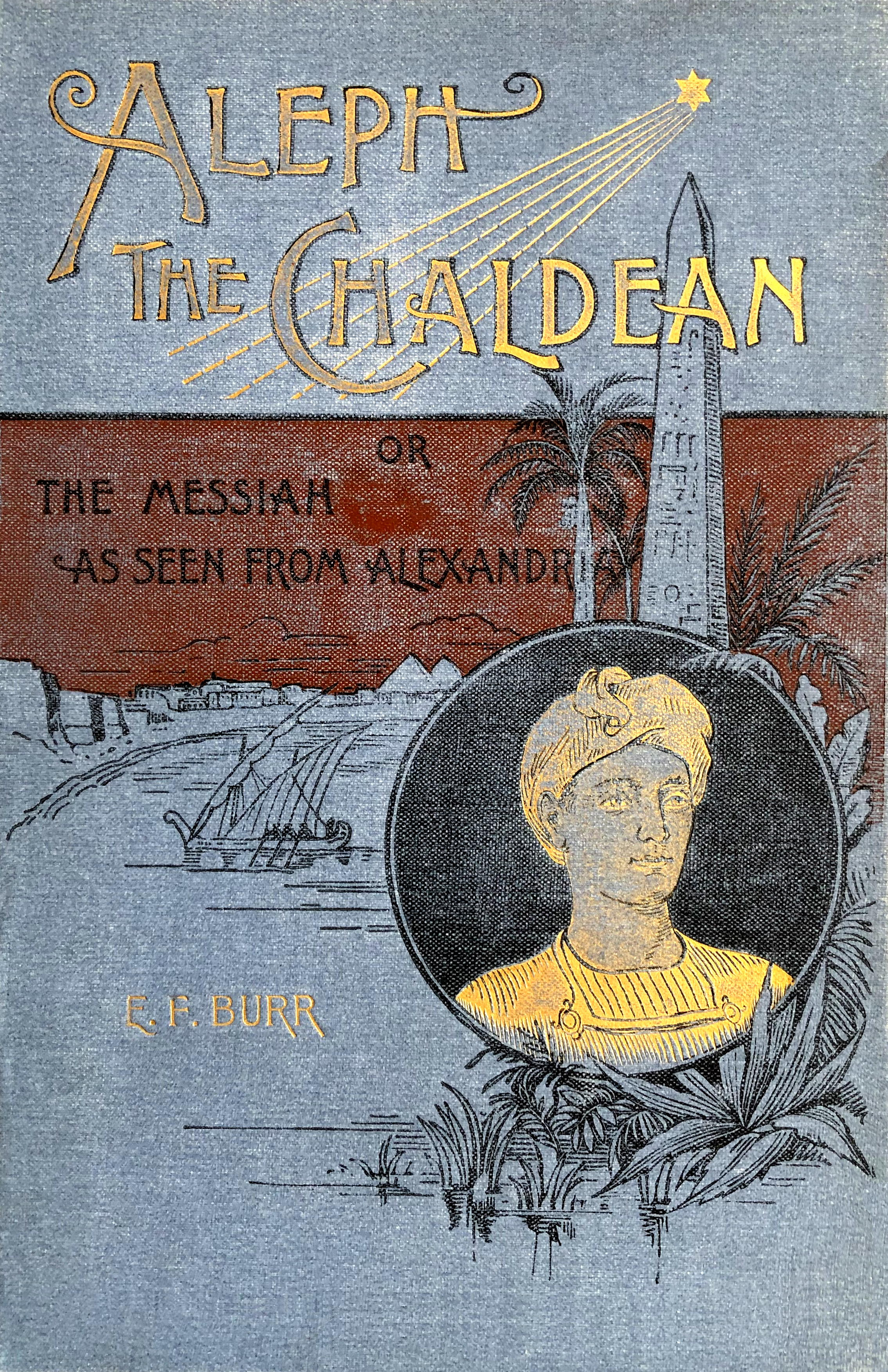
Cover of Aleph the Chaldean, 1891.

Born in Westport, Connecticut, to Zalmon and Mary (Hanford) Burr, he spent a year in the Yale Theological Seminary and two years in scientific study in New Haven. Owing to the failure of his health he was at home for the following three years, after which he devoted himself to study of the higher mathematics and physical astronomy under Professor Lyman in New Haven for three or four years.

He was licensed to preach in 1842, and October 3, 1850, was ordained pastor of the Congregational Church of Hamburg, in the town of Lyme He married Lyme native Harriet A. Lord on August 12, 1851. With his wife and brother, Rev. Zalmon B. Burr, who was also his classmate, he went abroad in 1855, and spent nearly a year in travel. Burr continued in his pastorship throughout his life, until infirmity forced him to attempt to resign his pastorate in April, 1907; the church voted not to accept his resignation, but to continue the relationship of pastor as long as he lived.

Outside of his parish he was widely known through his scientific lectures and his numerous volumes. From 1868 to 1876 he was Lecturer on the Scientific Evidences of Religion at Amherst College, and he also lectured at the Sheffield Scientific School, at Williams College, and in New York and Boston. The substance of his lectures before the Seniors of Amherst College was printed in his Pater Mundi. He received the honorary degree of Doctor of Divinity from Amherst College in 1868.

His published books included sermons, essays, verse, and fiction. His Ecce Coelum, or Parish Astronomy, probably his best-known book, appeared in 1867, and was followed by other astronomical works.

Horace Bushnell, after reading Ecce Coelum, wrote:

I have not been so much fascinated by any book for a long time,—never by a book on that particular subject. It is popularized in the form, yet not evaporated in the substance,—it tingles with life all through,—and the wonder is, that, casting off so much of the paraphernalia of science, and descending, for the most part, to common language, it brings out, not so much, but so much more of the meaning. I have gotten a better idea of astronomy, as a whole, from it than I ever got before from all other sources,—more than from Enfield's great book [perhaps Institutes of Natural Philosophy: Theoretical and Practical by William Enfield], which I once carefully worked out, eclipses and all.

Burr died at his home in Lyme at the age of 89, survived by his wife, son, and daughter.

== Bibliography: books by Enoch Fitch Burr ==
- A Treatise on the Application of the Calculus to the Theory of Neptune (1848)
- Ecce Coelum (1867)
- Pater Mundi (1869)
- Ad Fidem (1871)
- About Spiritualism and Facts in Aid of Faith (1872)
- Thy Voyage and Other Poems (1874)
- Tempted to Unbelief (1882)
- Ecce Terra (1884)
- Celestial Empires (1885)
- Universal Beliefs (1887)
- Long Ago (1888)
- Supreme Things in Their Practical Relations (1889)
- Aleph, the Chaldean; or, The Messiah as Seen from Alexandria, a novel (1891)
- The Stars of God, essays (1896)
