= Merit (Christianity) =

Concept in Christian theology

In Christian theology, merit (Latin: meritum) accrues when a believer's good work incurs "a future reward from a graceful God". The role of human merit in Christian life has been a point of dispute between Catholics and Protestants.

Both Catholics and Lutherans affirm the common Christian belief that a person's justification is not determined by that person's merit: "By grace alone, in faith in Christ's saving work and not because of any merit on our part, we are accepted by God and receive the Holy Spirit, who renews our hearts while equipping and calling us to good works".

The Catholic Church further teaches that "When Catholics affirm the 'meritorious' character of good works, they wish to say that, according to the biblical witness, a reward in heaven is promised to these works. Their intention is to emphasize the responsibility of persons for their actions, not to contest the character of those works as gifts, or far less to deny that justification always remains the unmerited gift of grace". The idea of merit underpins many obvious Catholic doctrines: prayers for the dead, indulgences, the Church's treasury of merit, and the intercession of saints.

The Lutheran Churches teach "that although justification and eternal life go along with faith, nevertheless, good works merit other bodily and spiritual rewards and degrees of reward."

Reformed doctrine has not developed a positive theology of human merit, except for the merit of Christ that humans receive through divine grace, and also generally dismisses the idea that charitable good works by Christians have any intrinsic merit.

== Catholicism ==
In Catholic theology, merit is a property of a good work which entitles the doer to receive a reward: it is a salutary act (i.e., "Human action that is performed under the influence of grace and that positively leads a person to a heavenly destiny") to which God, in whose service the work is done, in consequence of his infallible promise may give a reward (prœmium, merces). It is treasure "laid up in heaven". Just as God is just to punish demerits, he is just to reward merits.

The Church has a figurative communal Treasury of Merit. Merit is transferable: it increases by sharing it: a person with merit who prays or acts effectively with that merit increases their own merit and transfers merit to the person prayer for or interacted with. This transferability is part of the Catholic doctrine of the Communion of Saints, which entails that salvation is more than an individual fiduciary arrangement but has communal involvement. It also underlies the doctrines of indulgences, prayers for the dead and the intercession of saints.

Prayer need not be made by someone who has merited any reward to be effective, nor is there any aspect of extortion or transaction: God also hears anyone "who prays appeals solely to the goodness, love, and liberality of God for the fulfilment of his desires, without throwing the weight of his own merits into the scale..." (known theologically as the "effect of impetration" effectus impetratorius)

=== Nature of merit ===
Merit exists only in works that are positively good.

The merits of our good works are gifts of the divine goodness. "Grace has gone before us; now we are given what is due.... Our merits are God's gifts."

— Catechism of the Catholic Church, III Merit, 2009, quoting St Augustine of Hippo

In Christian theology, humans possesses nothing of their own; all that they have and all that they do is a gift of God, and, since God is infinitely self-sufficient, there is no advantage or benefit which a human can by their services confer upon God. Hence on the part of God there can only be question of a gratuitous promise of reward for certain good works. For such works he owes the promised reward, not in justice or equity, but because he has freely bound himself, i.e., because of his own attributes of veracity and fidelity.

==== Kinds of merit; justice and grace ====
Many Catholic Scholastic theologians attempted to explain merit by distinguished two kinds:

- Congruous merit (meritum inadœquatum sive de congruo) or quasi-merit is, according to historian Thomas P. Scheck, "God's loving promise to reward human effort, even that carried out by a man outside the state of grace."
  - Congruous merit attracts a reward only on the ground of fairness or appropriateness not obligation.
  - The reward for congruous merit is not salvation, but may be supernatural grace, which may lead to justification and salvation. "The doors of divine mercy are closed against none who sincerely ask for mercy."
  - Whenever "merit" is mentioned as preceding grace, it is congruous merit only.
- Condign merit (meritum adœquatum sive de condigno) or merit in the strict sense of the word is, according to Scheck, "God's obligation to reward man's efforts."
  - Outside an infusion of grace, humans have no ability to oblige God.
  - However, someone who has been adopted by God is thereby granted rights by God: "If sons, heirs also" (Rom 8:17).
  - Condign merit supposes an equality between service and return; it is measured by commutative justice (justitia commutativa), and thus gives a real claim to a reward.

Philosopher Richard Cross notes "Underlying it is the claim that the reward for condign merit is everlasting life, and that the reward for congruous merit is the gift of sanctifying grace ... "

This early-scholastic distinction and terminology, which developed in the controversies with the Pelagians and Semipelagians, were again emphasized by Johann Eck, the famous adversary of Martin Luther (cf. Greying, "Joh. Eck als junger Gelehrter," Münster, 1906, pp. 153 sqq.). The essential difference between meritum de condigno and meritum de congruo is based on the fact that, besides those works which claim a remuneration under pain of violating strict justice (as in contracts between employer and employee, in buying and selling, etc.), there are also other meritorious works which at most are entitled to reward or honour for reasons of equity (ex œquitate) or mere distributive justice (ex iustitia distributiva), as in the case of gratuities and military decorations. From an ethical point of view the difference practically amounts to this that, if the reward due to condign merit be withheld, there is a violation of right and justice and the consequent obligation in conscience to make restitution, while, in the case of congruous merit, to withhold the reward involves no violation of right and no obligation to restore, it being merely an offence against what is fitting or a matter of personal discrimination (acceptio personarum). Hence the reward of congruous merit always depends in great measure on the kindness and liberality of the giver, though not purely and simply on his good will.

The relation between merit and reward furnishes the intrinsic reason why in the matter of service and its remuneration, the guiding norm can be only the virtue of justice, and not disinterested kindness or pure mercy; for it would destroy the very notion of reward to conceive of it as a free gift of bounty (cf. Rom., xi, 6).

If, however, salutary acts can in virtue of divine justice give the right to an eternal reward, this is possible only because they themselves have their root in gratuitous grace, and consequently are of their very nature dependent ultimately on grace, as the Council of Trent emphatically declares (Sess. VI, cap. xvi, in Denzinger, 10th ed., Freiburg, 1908, n. 810): "the Lord ... whose bounty towards all men is so great, that He will have the things, which are His own gifts, be their merits."

Another term used is supererogatory merit, which is merit given for doing above what a Christian is required.

=== Conditions of merit ===
In Catholic teaching, for all true merit, there are seven conditions, of which four regard the meritorious work (viz. a work must be morally good, morally free, done with the assistance of actual grace, and inspired by a supernatural motive), two regard the agent who merits (viz. they must be in the state of pilgrimage and in the state of grace), and one regards God who rewards.

1. In order to be meritorious, a work must be morally good.
2. As to the second requisite, i. e., moral liberty, it is clear from ethics that actions, due to external force or internal compulsion, can deserve neither reward nor punishment. It is an axiom of criminal jurisprudence that no one shall be punished for a misdeed done without free will; similarly, a good work can only then be meritorious and deserving of reward when it proceeds from a free determination of the will. This is the teaching of Christ (Matt., xix, 21): "If thou wilt be perfect, go sell what thou hast, and give it to the poor, and thou shalt have treasure in heaven."
3. The necessity of the third condition, i. e., of the influence of actual grace, is clear from the fact that every act meriting heaven must evidently be supernatural just as heaven itself is supernatural, and that consequently it cannot be performed without the help of prevenient and assisting grace, which is necessary even for the just. The strictly supernatural destiny of the Beatific Vision, for which the Christian must strive, necessitates ways and means which lie altogether beyond what is purely natural (see Grace).
4. Finally, a supernatural motive is required because good works must be supernatural, not only as regards their object and circumstances, but also as regards the end for which they are performed (ex fine). But, in assigning the necessary qualities of this motive, theologians differ widely. While some require the motive of faith (motivum fidei) in order to have merit, others demand in addition the motive of charity (motivum caritatis), and thus, by rendering the conditions more difficult, considerably restrict the extent of meritorious works (as distinguished from merely good works). Others again set down as the only condition of merit that the good work of the just man or woman, who already has habitual faith and charity, be in conformity with the Divine law, and require no other special motive.
5. The agent who merits must both be in the state of pilgrimage (status viœ). By the state of pilgrimage is to be understood our earthly life; death as a natural (although not an essentially necessary) limit, closes the time of meriting. The time of sowing is confined to this life; the reaping is reserved for the next, when no man or woman will be able to sow either wheat or cockle. The opinion proposed by a few theologians (Hirscher, Schell), that for certain classes of men there may still be a possibility of conversion after death, is contrary to the revealed truth that the particular judgment (judicium particulare) determines instantly and definitively whether the future is to be one of eternal happiness or of eternal misery (cf. Kleutgen, "Theologie der Vorzeit", II, 2nd ed., Münster, 1872, pp. 427 sqq.). Baptized children, who die before attaining the age of reason, are admitted to heaven without merits on the sole title of inheritance (titulus hœreditatis); in the case of adults, however, there is the additional title of reward (titulus mercedis), and for that reason they will enjoy a greater measure of eternal happiness.
6. In addition to the state of pilgrimage, the state of grace (status gratiœ) (i. e., the possession of sanctifying grace) is required for meriting, because only the just can be "sons of God" and "heirs of heaven" (cf. Rom., viii, 17). In the parable of the vine Christ expressly declares the "abiding in him" a necessary condition for "bearing fruit": "He that abideth in me, and I in him, the same beareth much fruit" (John, xv, 5); and this constant union with Christ is effected only by sanctifying grace. In opposition to Vasquez, most theologians are of opinion that one who is holier will gain greater merit for a given work than one who is less holy, although the latter perform the same work under exactly the same circumstances and in the same way. The reason is that a higher degree of grace enhances the godlike dignity of the agent, and this dignity increases the value of the merit.
7. Merit requires on the part of God that he accept (in actu secundo) the good work as meritorious, even though the work in itself (in actu primo) and previous to its acceptance by God, be already truly meritorious. Theologians, however, are not agreed as to the necessity of this condition. The Scotists hold that the entire condignity of the good work rests exclusively on the gratuitous promise of God and his free acceptance, without which even the most heroic act is devoid of merit, and with which even mere naturally good works may become meritorious.

=== Church teaching ===
Apart from earlier dogmatic declarations given in the Second Synod of Orange of 529 and in the Fourth Lateran Council of 1215 (see Denzinger, 191, 430), the Council of Trent upheld the traditional doctrine of merit by insisting that life everlasting is both a grace and a reward (Sess. VI, cap. xvi, in Denzinger, n. 809). It condemned as heretical Luther's doctrine of the sinfulness of good works (Sess. VI, can. xxv), and declared as a dogma that the just, in return for their good works done in God through the merits of Jesus, should expect an eternal reward (loc. cit., can. xxvi).

== Lutheranism ==
The Lutheran Churches teach that God rewards good works done by Christians; the Apology of the Augsburg Confession teaches: "We also affirm what we have often said, that although justification and eternal life go along with faith, nevertheless, good works merit other bodily and spiritual rewards and degrees of reward. According to 1 Corinthians 3:8, ‘Each will receive his wages according to his labor.’" It further teaches:

Works and troubles do not merit justification, but other payments, as the reward is offered for the works in these passages: ‘Whoever sows sparingly will also reap sparingly, and whoever sows bountifully will also reap bountifully’ (2 Corinthians 9:6). Here clearly the measure of the reward is connected with the measure of the work. ‘Honor your father and your mother, that your days may be long in the land’ (Exodus 20:12). Also here the Law offers a reward to a certain work. The fulfilling of the Law earns a reward, for a reward properly relates to the Law. Yet we should be mindful of the Gospel, which freely offers justification for Christ’s sake. We neither obey the Law, nor can obey it, before we have been reconciled to God, justified, and reborn. Nor would fulfilling the Law please God, unless we were accepted because of faith. People are accepted because of faith. For this very reason the initial fulfilling of the Law pleases and has a reward in this life and in the next.” (AP V [III]): Love and the Fulfilling of the Law 245-247).

Regarding the Roman Catholic doctrine, in the Latin version of his Assertion of Article Thirty Six (1521) Martin Luther denied the category of congruous merit, writing that Paul "wanted it to be understood that everything we are and do by our nature merits wrath and not at all grace." In his 1532 Commentary on the Sermon of the Mount, he noted that while the reward one gains from condign merit is much greater than that of congruent merit, the sort of good works said to attain each type of merit is similar. Luther thought it did not make sense that the two types of merit could be gained by similar actions when the benefit of condign merit is so much greater than the benefit of congruent merit.

== Reformed ==
According to the doctrine of Calvin (Instit., III, ii, 4) good works are "impurities and defilement" (inquinamenta et sordes), but God covers their innate hideousness with the cloak of the merits of Christ, and imputes them to the predestined as good works in order that he may requite them not with life eternal, but at most with a temporal reward.

== See also ==
- Good works
- Grace
- Five Crowns
- Merit (Buddhism)
- Thawab
