= Thawab =

Arabic term for spiritual reward

Thawāb, sawab, sevap, hasanat or ajr (Arabic: ثواب) is an Arabic term meaning "reward". Specifically, in the context of an Islamic worldview, thawāb refers to spiritual merit or reward that accrues from the performance of good deeds and piety based on the guidance of the Quran and the Sunnah of Muhammad.

== Pronunciation ==
The word thawāb is used throughout the Islamic world, so the spelling and pronunciation is slightly different from one region to another. In Kazakh society, for instance, it may be pronounced as "sauap", by Bengalis as "suab", "sowab", or "swab", in Iran as "savob", in India and Pakistan as "sawab". Among Kurds its pronounced "Sewab". In Bosnian and Turkish the word becomes sevap.

== See also ==
- Islamic views on piety
- Punya – Hindu view of Sawāb/Heavenly merit.
- Heavenly Merit – Christian view of sawāb.
- Hasanāt – from Arabic حَسَنَات
