= Penal substitution =

Postulation about the significance of Christ's death

Penal substitution, also called penal substitutionary atonement and especially in older writings forensic theory, is a theory of the atonement within Protestant Christian theology, which declares that Christ, voluntarily submitting to God the Father's plan, was punished (penalized) in the place of sinners (substitution), thus satisfying the demands of justice and propitiation, so God can justly forgive sins making us at one with God (atonement). It began with the German Reformation leader Martin Luther and continued to develop within the Calvinist tradition as a specific understanding of substitutionary atonement. The penal model teaches that the substitutionary nature of Jesus' death is understood in the sense of a substitutionary fulfilment of legal demands for the offenses of sins.

== Definition ==
The penal substitution theory teaches that Jesus suffered the penalty due, according to God the Father's wrath for humanity's sins. The St Andrews Encyclopedia of Theology states the definition as, “Jesus satisfies the righteousness of God by suffering the penalty for sin in our place, that we might participate in his righteousness”, while recognising that there is a wide range of views within that definition.

Penal substitution derives from the idea that divine forgiveness must satisfy divine justice, that is, that God is not willing or able to simply forgive sin without first requiring a satisfaction for it. It states that God gave himself in the person of his Son, Jesus, to suffer the death, punishment and curse due to fallen humanity as the penalty for human sin.

Important theological concepts about penal substitution depend on the doctrine of the Trinity. Those who believe that Jesus was himself God, in line with the doctrine of the Trinity, believe that God took the punishment upon himself rather than putting it on someone else. In other words, the doctrine of union with Christ affirms that, by taking the punishment upon himself, Jesus fulfils the demands of justice not for an unrelated third party but for those identified with him. If, in the penal substitution understanding of the atonement, the death of Christ deals with sin and injustice, his resurrection is the renewal and restoration of righteousness.

== Development ==
The penal substitution theory is a specific interpretation of vicarious (substitutionary) atonement, which in turn goes back to Second Temple Judaism, although some evangelicals such as William Lane Craig cite Moses' offer of death for himself instead of for the people of Israel (Exodus 32:30-34) as an example of this substitution. It was developed during the Protestant Reformation of the 16th century, being advocated by Martin Luther (Note: Gustaf Aulén, a critic of penal substitution theory, disputed in his 1931 book Christus Victor that Luther accepted penal substitution. 'Under Aulen's assessment, Martin Luther revitalized the Christus Victor paradigm. According to Aulen, however, beginning with Melanchthon himself, Luther's reappropriation of the classic theme was quickly lost within later Protestant circles as more objective, "Latin," theories were allowed to displace it.' (Paul R. Eddy and James Beilby, 'The Atonement: An Introduction', in P. R. Eddy and J. Beilby [eds], The Nature of the Atonement: Four Views [Downers Grove: IVP, 2006], p. 13)) and John Calvin. It was more concretely formulated by the Reformed theologian Charles Hodge (1797–1878). Advocates of penal substitution argue that the concept is both biblically-based and rooted in the historical traditions of the Christian Church.

=== Vicarious atonement ===
The idea of vicarious atonement flows from Judaism. Isaiah 53:4–6, 10, 11 refers to the "suffering servant":

Surely he has borne our griefs and carried our sorrows; yet we esteemed him stricken, smitten by God, and afflicted. But he was wounded for our transgressions, he was bruised for our iniquities; upon him was the chastisement that made us whole, and with his stripes we are healed. All we like sheep have gone astray; we have turned every one to his own way; and the LORD has laid on him the iniquity of us all ... It was the will of the LORD to bruise him; he has put him to grief; when he makes himself an offering for sin ... By his knowledge shall the righteous one, my servant, make many to be accounted righteous; and he shall bear their iniquities."

=== New Testament ===
The New Testament authors used various metaphors to explain and interpret the death and resurrection of Jesus. According to C. Marvin Pate, "there are three aspects to Christ's atonement according to the early Church: vicarious atonement [substitutionary atonement], (Note: In Christianity, vicarious atonement, also called substitutionary atonement, is the idea that Jesus died "for us.") the eschatological defeat of Satan [Christ the Victor], and the imitation of Christ [participation in Jesus' death and resurrection]." Pate further notes that these three aspects were intertwined in the earliest Christian writings, but that this intertwining was lost since the Patristic times.

Key New Testament references which can be interpreted to reflect a vicarious atonement of Jesus' death and resurrection include:

- Romans 3:23–26—"All have sinned and fall short of the glory of God; they are now justified by his grace as a gift, through the redemption that is in Christ Jesus, whom God put forward as a sacrifice of atonement by his blood, effective through faith. He did this to show his righteousness, because in his divine forbearance he had passed over the sins previously committed; it was to prove at the present time that he himself is righteous and that he justifies the one who has faith in Jesus." (NRSV)
- 2 Corinthians 5:21—"For our sake he made him to be sin who knew no sin, so that in him we might become the righteousness of God." (RSV)
- Galatians 3:10, 13—"All who rely on works of the law are under a curse; for it is written, 'Cursed be every one who does not abide by all things written in the book of the law, and do them.' ... Christ redeemed us from the curse of the law, having become a curse for us – for it is written, 'Cursed be every one who hangs on a tree.'" (RSV)
- Colossians 2:13–15—"And you, who were dead in trespasses and uncircumcision of your flesh having cancelled the bond which stood against us with its legal demands; this he set aside, nailing it to the cross. He disarmed the principalities and powers and made a public example of them, triumphing over them in him." (RSV)
- 1 Peter 2:24—"He himself bore our sins in his body on the tree, that we might die to sin and live to righteousness." (RSV)
- 1 Peter 3:18—"For Christ also died for sins once for all, the righteous for the unrighteous, that he might bring us to God." (RSV)

On the basis of Romans 3:23–26, N. T. Wright has argued that there are, in fact, different models of penal substitution in which ideas of justification work together with redemption and sacrifice.

=== Early Church ===
The ransom theory of atonement was the nearly predominant view accepted in the period of the Early Church Fathers. As ransom theory of atonement began to fade from view in the Middle Ages, other theories such as the satisfaction theory began to develop. It has been generally recognized that only hints of penal substitutionary atonement can be found in the writing of the Early Church, with the most explicit articulations arriving during the time of the Reformation.

Scholars vary when interpreting proposed precursors to penal substitution in the writings of some of the Early Church Fathers, including Justin Martyr (c. 100 – c. 165), Eusebius of Caesarea (c. 275 – 339), Athanasius of Alexandria (c. 296 – 373) and Augustine of Hippo (354–430). There is general agreement that no writer in the Early Church taught penal substitution as their primary theory of atonement. Yet some writers appear to reference some of the ideas of penal substitution as an afterthought or as an aside.

Some see Augustine as speaking about penal substitutionary atonement in his exposition of Psalm 51: "For even the Lord was subject to death, but not on account of sin: He took upon Him our punishment, and so looses our guilt" and in his Enchiridion he says: "Now, as men were lying under this wrath by reason of their original sin... there was need for a mediator, that is for a reconciler, who by the offering of one sacrifice, of which all the sacrifices of the law and the prophets were types, should take away this wrath... Now when God is said to be angry, we do not attribute to Him such a disturbed feeling as exists in the mind of an angry man; but we call His just displeasure against sin by the name "anger" a word transferred by analogy from human emotions."

The ransom theory of atonement is a substitutionary theory of atonement, just as penal substitution is. It can therefore be difficult to distinguish intended references to the ransom view by Early Church writers from real penal substitutionary ideas. (Note: Patristics scholar J. N. D. Kelly is one of the scholars most willing to see precursors to penal substitution in the Early Church writings, and points to a variety of passages which "pictur[e] Christ as substituting himself for sinful men, shouldering the penalty which justice required them to pay, and reconciling them to God by his sacrificial death." Scholar J. S. Romanides, however, disagrees with Kelly's reading of these passages. Instead, he argues that they, like the Eastern Orthodox Church of today, understood humankind as separating themselves from God and placing themselves under the power of sin and death. The work of Christ is viewed, he says, not as a satisfaction of God's wrath or the satisfaction of justice which God was bound to by necessity, but as the work of rescuing us from death and its power. He argues that the notion of penal substitution was never contemplated until Augustine, and was never accepted in any form in the East. Further and similarly to Romanides, Derek Flood argues (through the example of Justin Martyr, Augustine and Athanasius) that the Early Church never held an atonement theory of penal substitution but, rather, a restorative substitutionary model of the atonement, and that penal substitution was not truly developed until Calvin. Gustaf Aulén, in his classic Christus Victor, argues that the ransom theory was the dominant understanding of the atonement for over a thousand years and that the penal substitution theory came only after Anselm.)

The Fathers often worked upon biblical quotations, from both Testaments, describing Christ's saving work, sometimes adding one to another from different places in Scripture. The dominant strain in the soteriological writings of the Greek Fathers, such as Athanasius of Alexandria, was the so-called "physical" theory that Christ, by becoming man, restored the divine image in us; but blended with this is the conviction that his death was necessary to release us from the curse of sin, and that he offered himself in sacrifice for us. (Note: Church Fathers: Irenaeus (130-202) uses phrases that could be misread as referring to penal substitution, but these phrases 'mainly describe the problem; they do not provide the content of the recapitulation idea'.; For Athanasius, Christ's substitution is not a payment to God, but rather a fulfillment of the conditions which are necessary to remove death and corruption from humanity; those conditions, he asserts, exist as consequences from sin. Controversy around atonement doctrine in the early centuries centred on Athanasius' promotion of a mystical view in which Christ had brought salvation through the incarnation itself, by combining both God and humanity in one flesh. This view of atonement required that Jesus be fully divine and fully human simultaneously, and Athanasius became embroiled in controversies on the Trinity and Christology as a result.; Gregory of Nazianzus (329-390) explicitly denied that Christ died as a payment to God (or to the devil), preferring to say that God accepted Christ's work as a way to rescue humanity, rather than a way to placate God's wrath or purchase forgiveness from God. Augustine's main belief regarding the atonement was not penal substitutionary but, like Gregory's, the classic, or ransom, theory.; Augustine of Hippo (354-430) writes that "by His [Jesus'] death, the one most true sacrifice offered on our behalf, He purged abolished and extinguished ... whatever guilt we had." This is one of several strands of thought: he expounds the mediating work of Christ, his act of ransoming humankind and also the exemplary aspect of Christ's work. As with his Eastern predecessors, such as Justin Martyr (c. 100-165) and Gregory of Nazianzus (c. 329-390), the imagery of sacrifice, ransom, expiation, and reconciliation all appear in his writings—all of these, however, are themes embraced by other atonement models and are not necessarily indicative of penal substitutionary atonement.)

=== Anselm (11th century) ===
It was not until Anselm of Canterbury (1033/4–1109) wrote his famous work Cur Deus Homo (1098) that attention was focused on the theology of redemption with the aim of providing more exact definitions. (Note: There is disagreement as to how influential penal conceptions were in the first five centuries). Anselm held that to sin is for man "not to render his due to God.") Anselm's view can best be understood from medieval feudalistic conceptions of authority, of sanctions and of reparation. Anselmian satisfaction contrasts with penal substitution in that Anselm sees the satisfaction (i.e. restitution) as an alternative to punishment.

According to Anselm, "The honour taken away must be repaid, or punishment must follow" (bk 1 ch 8), whereas penal substitution views the punishment as the means of satisfaction. Comparing what was due to God and what was due to the feudal Lord, he argued that what was due to God was honor. "'Honor' comprises the whole complex of service and worship which the whole creation, animate and inanimate, in heaven and earth, owes to the Creator. The honor of God is injured by the withdrawal of man's service which he is due to offer." This failure constitutes a debt, weight or doom, for which man must make satisfaction, but which lies beyond his competence; only if a new man can be found who by perfect obedience can satisfy God's honour and by some work of supererogation can provide the means of paying the existing debt of his fellows, can God's original purpose be fulfilled. So Christ not only lives a sinless life, which is again his due, but also is willing to endure death for the sake of love. (Note: In order to better understand the historical situation in which Anselm developed his argument one must recall that medieval common law developed out of Germanic tribal law, in which one finds the principle of the wergild, i.e., the value which a man's life had determined by his social standing within a tribal community. Thus if a man killed a slave, he owed the owner of the slave the amount of money he had paid for the slave or would have to pay to buy another slave of equal worth. If a man killed another free man he forfeited his own life, unless the slain man's family or tribe agreed to accept some amount of money or goods equal to the value of the slain free man's life within his own tribal group. Again, a man's honour is conceived of in terms of his social standing within his own tribal group. Thus, a slave has no honour since he is owned by another, but a free man's social standing is equal to that of another free man within his tribal group, but is subordinate to that of his tribal king. A free man will, therefore, defend his own honour with his life, or forfeit it (i.e., his social standing within his tribal group) and any affront to his honor by another free man must be repaid by the other man's forfeiting of his own life. Hence the custom of fighting duels. One who committed an affront to another man's honour or would not defend his own affronted honour would be regarded as a coward and suffer outlawry, i.e., he would lose his own social value and standing within his tribe and anyone could kill him without fear of retaliation from the man's tribal group. Thus, since God is infinite, his honour is infinite and any affront to his honour requires from humanity an infinite satisfaction. Furthermore, as humanity's Creator, God is humanity's Master and humanity has nothing of its own with which to compensate for this affront to his honour. God, nevertheless, must require something of equal value to his divine honour, otherwise God would forfeit his own essential dignity as God. Anselm resolves the dilemma thus created by maintaining that since Christ is both God and man he can act as humanity's champion, (i.e., as a man he is a member of humanity—again, conceived of in tribal terms, i.e., Christ is member of the human tribe, with all the standing and social responsibilities inherent in such membership) he can pay the infinite wergild that humanity owes for the slighted divine honour, for while the life he forfeits to pay this wergild on humanity's behalf is a human life, it is the human life of his divine person & thus has the infinite value proper to his divine person. At the same time, Christ is also God and thus his divine person and his human life, as the human life of his divine person, has infinite value. Thus he offers his human life (with its nevertheless infinite value as the human life of his divine person) as the wergild humanity owes his divine Master for his humanity's affront to his divine honour as God. At the same time, Christ as God acts as the champion of the infinite dignity of his own divine honour as God and Master of humanity by accepting as God the infinite value of the wergild of his own human life as the human life of his own divine person as the proper and only sufficient wergild due to his own divine honour. One might thus interpret Anselm's understanding of the Cross in terms of a duel fought between Christ's identification with humanity as a man and his divine honour as God in which the claims of both his human and divine natures are met, vindicated and thus reconciled.)

Although penal substitution is often associated with Anselm, he predates its formal development within Reformed theology. It is therefore doubted even among Reformed theologians whether his 'satisfaction' theory is strictly equivalent.

=== Reformation ===
The Reformers claimed repeatedly to be recovering the truth of the Gospel from both the New Testament and the earliest Church Fathers. They generally believed doctrinal errors were introduced by the later fathers of the Middle Ages.

==== Luther ====
Broadly speaking, Martin Luther followed Anselm, thus remaining mainly in the "Latin" model identified by Gustaf Aulén. He held, however, that Christ's atoning work encompassed both his active and passive obedience to the law: as the perfectly innocent God-man, he fulfilled the law perfectly during his life and, in his death on the cross, bore the eternal punishment that all men deserved for their breaking the law. Unlike Anselm, Luther thus combines both satisfaction and punishment. Furthermore, Luther rejected the fundamentally legalistic character of Anselm's paradigm in terms of an understanding of the Cross in the more personal terms of an actual conflict between the wrath of God at the sinner and the love of God for the same sinner. (For Luther this conflict was real, personal, dynamic and not merely forensic or analogical. If Anselm conceived of the Cross in terms of a forensic duel between Christ's identification with humanity and the infinite value and majesty of his divine person, Luther perceived the Cross as a new Götterdammerung, a dramatic, definitive struggle between the divine attributes of God's implacable righteousness against the sinful humanity and inscrutable identification with this same helpless humanity which gave birth to a New Creation, whose undeniable reality could only be glimpsed through faith and whose invincible power worked only through love. One cannot understand the unique character or force of Luther's and the Lutheran understanding of the Cross apart from this dramatic character which is not readily translated into or expressed through the more rational philosophical categories of dogmatic theology, even when these categories are those of Lutheran Orthodoxy itself.)

==== Calvin ====
Calvin appropriated Anselm's ideas but changed the terminology to that of the criminal law with which he was familiar—since he was trained as a lawyer. Man is guilty before God's judgement and the only appropriate punishment is eternal death. The Son of God has become man and has stood in man's place to bear the immeasurable weight of wrath—the curse, and the condemnation of a righteous God. He was "made a substitute and a surety in the place of transgressors and even submitted as a criminal, to sustain and suffer all the punishment which would have been inflicted on them."

Calvin made special appeal to the Suffering Servant passage in Isaiah 53 and to 1 Peter 3:18–22 with its reference to the "Harrowing of Hell"—the release of the spirits of those who had died before Christ. From the former, he singled out "But he was wounded for our transgressions, he was bruised for our iniquities; upon him was the chastisement that made us whole, and with his stripes we are healed." Both are set by Calvin within the context of Pilate's court of judgment to which, according to Dillistone, they do not properly belong; nevertheless, the image of "one who has borne the stripes and the chastisement which should, by strict desert have fallen" upon others, within the divine purpose, is, on all sides agreed to be an essential element in the story.

==== John Wesley ====
John Wesley, the founder of Methodism, is claimed by some to have held to the penal substitution theory of the atonement. Kenneth J. Collins in his book The Theology of John Wesley: Holy Love and the Shape of Grace writes, "for Wesley, Christ makes compensation and satisfies the justice of God precisely by standing in the place of sinful humanity, by being reckoned among its numbers, and in the end by bearing the penalty, the very wages of sin." This is perhaps made the most clear in Wesley's writing entitled "The Doctrine of Original Sin". In this treatise Wesley writes, "Our sins were the procuring cause of all his sufferings. His sufferings were the penal effects of our sins. 'The chastisement of our peace,' the punishment necessary to procure it, 'was' laid 'on him,' freely submitting thereto: 'And by his stripes' (a part of his sufferings again put for the whole) 'we are healed'; pardon, sanctification, and final salvation, are all purchased and bestowed upon us. Every chastisement is for some fault. That laid on Christ was not for his own, but ours; and was needful to reconcile an offended Lawgiver, and offering [offending?] guilty creatures, to each other. So 'the Lord laid on him the iniquity of us all'; that is, the punishment due to our iniquity." Kenneth J. Collins goes on to state however that Wesley felt that the other reformers, "view of imputation and justification hindered the believer's motivation for sanctification. He held that sanctification was "the ability to cooperate with God, and thereby to prosper and grow in grace" Thus, Wesley's views are incompatible with the Penal Substitution theory, which holds that due to Jesus bearing the penalty for sins, His righteousness is thus imputed to the believer, pardoning all past, present and future sins. Randy Maddox views Wesley's atonement theology, "as a Penalty Satisfaction explanation of the Atonement which has a Moral Influence purpose, and a Ransom effect", This would place Wesley's atonement theology more in line with the Satisfaction theory along with Moral Influence and Ransom theories of the Early Church. Likewise, in Wesley's 1742 sermon entitled, "Awake Thou that Sleepest.", it appears that Wesley held to a view of the atonement in line with that of Eastern Orthodoxy and the Greek Early Church Fathers.

The work of the Reformers, including Zwingli and Philip Melanchthon, was hugely influential. It took away from Christianity the requirement of works as a means of justification, whether corporal or spiritual, of the need for penance, belief in purgatory, etc.; and it did so by emphasizing a finality of Christ's work.

== Criticisms and replies ==
=== Criticisms ===
Ever since the doctrine of penal substitution received full expression in the Reformation period, it has been the subject of continual criticism on biblical, moral and logical grounds. A number of 21st century works provide recent critiques. The first extensive criticism of the penal substitution came during the Reformation period from within the Anabaptist movement by Fausto Sozzini. He argued that penal substitution was "irrational, incoherent, immoral and impossible." (Note: Though, interestingly, Sozzini's other views would later be adopted by the Calvinist Polish Brethren church) His objections were as follows:

1. Perfect satisfaction for sin, even by way of substitution, leaves no room for divine forgiveness or pardon.
2. It is unjust both to punish the innocent and to allow the guilty to go free.
3. The finite suffering and temporary death of one is disproportionate to the infinite suffering and permanent death of many.
4. The grace of perfect satisfaction would appear to confer on its beneficiaries a freedom to sin without consequence.

Calvin's general framework, coinciding as it did with a rising respect for law, considered as a bulwark against the ferments of war, revolution and civil insurrection, remained normative for Reformed Christians for the next three centuries. Moreover, if Socinus spoke from the point of view of the radical reformers, there were also Catholics for whom the idea of a "legal" penal substitution would weaken the magisterial doctrines of sanctification, the spiritual life of the believer, and his or her appropriation of the divine mystery through the sacraments of penance and the Eucharist.

Further, with the development of notions of inalienable personal responsibility in law, the idea of "penal" substitution has become less easy to maintain. In modern law, the punishment of the innocent and the acquittal of the guilty is regarded as the perfect example of injustice. Anglican theologian F. W. Dillistone stated that "no strictly penal theology of the atonement can be expected to carry conviction in the world of the twentieth century."

Among the problems identified is that the word "penal" implies an association with law, but the relationship between theological ideas and social institutions such as the law changes. The contemporary argument as to the relationship of human rights to positive law is a modern extension of this.

Secondly, ideas of justice and punishment are not the same in Jewish law, imperial Roman law, sixteenth-century European law and modern common law. Thus, for instance, "satisfaction" and "merit" are understandable within the context of Roman law, but sit less easily within either Old or New Testament conceptions. Likewise, when the word "penal" is used, it raises as many questions about the different theories of punishment, past and present.

Thirdly, in Calvin's work, and subsequently, there is an interplay between legal and cultic language. Words such as "curse", "expiation", "propitiation", "wrath", and "sacrifice" appear together with sixteenth-century legal language. "The framework is legal, the process is cultic. Removal of legal sanctions is equated with freedom of access in worship." Calvin contends that it was necessary for Jesus to suffer through a judicial process and to be condemned as a criminal (even though the process was flawed and Pilate washed his hands of the condemnation), but tying this to the need for sacrifice "proved to be a dead weight upon the thinking and imagining of Reformed Christendom." according to Dillistone.

Next, the two words "expiation" and "propitiation" present problems. It has been argued that the former, which means to purge away, needs to be distinguished from the latter, which means to appease a person, and that it is propitiation which presents the problem for those who are critical of the idea of penal substitution. Karl Barth (and later Jürgen Moltmann) argued in Church Dogmatics IV/1 that propitiation and expiation are false categories when applied to the triune God: If God forgives us in and through Christ ("Christ pays our debt"), then the cost has been borne by God in, as, and through Christ. For God to propitiate himself is expiation; because expiation is always self-propitiation as it means the forgiver paying the debt (here, the price of the sin) at his own expense. Hence Dietrich Bonhoeffer says grace is free, but is not cheap.

Additionally, a view of human salvation which defines it in terms of once-and-for-all acquittal has to deal with its relationship to subsequent actions and the lives of those not born at the time of the Paschal Mystery.

Some, like Karl Barth, simply criticized the concept of satisfaction of God's wrath for being unscriptural.

=== Replies ===
J. I. Packer states that language must be used in a stretched sense. God is not a sixteenth-century monarch, he says, and divine government is not the same as earthly government. He states that Christians should regard all truth of God as an "apprehended mystery," and always hold that God is greater than our formularies. He holds, nonetheless, that penal substitution can be described as a model in a way comparable to how physics uses the term. He defines the term model, in a theological sense, as "explanatory constructs formed to help us know, understand, and deal with God, the ultimate reality." He states that the "mystery of God is more than any one model, even the best, can express." He states that "all the knowledge we can have of the atonement is of a mystery which we can only think and speak by means of models." To Packer, the biblical models are presented as being inspired by God and given to us as "knowledge of the mystery of the cross." The theologian Stephen Sykes has interpreted Packer's account of penal substitution as being presented as a metaphor.

Theologians who advocate penal substitution are keen to define the doctrine carefully, rather than, as Packer says; "the primary question is, not the rationality or morality of God but the remission of one's sins." He suggests that it be seen not as a mechanical explanation (how it works) but rather than kerygmatically (what it means to us). Denney contends that the atonement should not be seen forensically (though as Packer says, Denney avoided the term "penal" in any case). What matters in Packer's view is that "Jesus Christ our Lord, moved by a love that was determined to do everything necessary to save us, endured and exhausted the destructive divine judgment for which we were otherwise inescapably destined, and so won us forgiveness, adoption and glory." However, John Stott critiques loveless caricatures of the cross as "a sacrifice to appease an angry God, or ... a legal transaction in which an innocent victim was made to pay the penalty for the crimes of others" as being "neither the Christianity of the Bible in general nor of Paul in particular." Furthermore, "It is doubtful if anybody has ever believed such a crude construction."

== Contemporary controversies ==
Controversy has arisen over a statement made by Steve Chalke that "The cross isn't a form of cosmic child abuse—A vengeful Father punishing his Son for an offense he has not even committed." This sparked a debate in the UK among evangelicals which is cataloged in the book The Atonement Debate: Papers from the London Symposium on the Theology of Atonement (Zondervan, 2008).

The debate has largely been conducted in evangelical circles, though the dismissal of the doctrine of penal substitution on moral grounds by Jeffrey John, an Anglo-Catholic priest and Dean of St Albans, in a broadcast talk during Holy Week 2007 has drawn fire in his direction.

In his book Mere Christianity C. S. Lewis mentions that before becoming a Christian, the doctrine of penal substitution had seemed extremely unethical to him, and that while he had since found it to be less so, he nonetheless indicated a preference for a position closer to that of Athanasius, in which Christ's death is seen as enabling us to die to sin by our participation, and not as a satisfaction or payment to justice as such. He also stated, however, that in his view no explanation of the atonement is as relevant as the fact of the atonement. Lewis's The Lion, the Witch and the Wardrobe in his fantasy fiction series, The Chronicles of Narnia, depicts the king Aslan surrendering himself to Jadis the White Witch as a substitute for the life of Edmund Pevensie, which appears to illustrate a ransom or Christus Victor approach to the atonement.

George MacDonald, a universalist Christian theologian who was a great influence on Lewis, wrote against the idea that God was unable or unwilling to forgive humans without a substitutionary punishment in his Unspoken Sermons, and stated that he found the idea to be completely unjust.

== See also ==
- Atonement in Christianity
- Divine retribution
- John Smyth (barrister)
- Satisfaction theory of atonement
- Reformed theology
- Retributive justice
- Substitutionary atonement
