= Vincent Taylor (theologian) =

Vincent Taylor FBA (1887–1968) was a Methodist biblical scholar and theologian. He was elected to the Fellowship of the British Academy in 1954, specializing in theology. During his career, he was both Principal of Wesley College, Headingley, Leeds and, from 1930–58, Ferens Professor of New Testament Language and Literature. He was also Examiner in Biblical Theology, London University. He has been described as "one of the outstanding New Testament scholars of his day and theologian of great renown and influence" with an "immense" literary output. According to the British Academy, his principal publications were Jesus and his sacrifice: a study of the Passion-sayings (1937), The atonement in New Testament teaching (1940) and The Gospel according to St Mark (1952).

In 1954 Taylor was the president of the Studiorum Novi Testamenti Societas (SNTS). There was a daughter from his marriage.

== Bibliography ==
Books

- The Gospel According to Saint Mark (1952) Macmillan & Company
- The Formation of the Gospel Tradition (1935) Macmillan & Company
- Forgiveness and Reconciliation: A Study in New Testament Theology (1956) Macmillan
- New Testament Essays (1970) Epworth Press
- The Atonement in New Testament Teaching (1940) Epworth Press
- Jesus and his Sacrifice: a Study of the Passion-sayings in the Gospels (1937) Macmillan & Company
- The Life and Ministry of Jesus (1955) Abingdon Press
- The Names of Jesus (1953) Macmillan
- The Gospels: A Short Introduction (1962) Epworth Press
- The Person of Christ in New Testament Teaching (1958) Macmillan
- The Cross of Christ: Eight Public Lectures (1956) Macmillan. (delivered at Drew University, Madison, New Jersey : 1955–6.)
- Text of the New Testament: A Short Introduction. (1961) St. Martin's Press
- The Passion Narrative of St Luke: A Critical and Historical Investigation edited by Owen E. Evans (2004) Cambridge University Press – The book defends and develops the argument for a non-Markan basis for the Gospel of Luke which he first presented in 1926.
- The Epistle to the Romans (1955) Epworth Press
- Behind the Third gospel: a study of the Proto-Luke hypothesis (1926) Clarendon Press
- The Historical Evidence for the Virgin Birth [Full Read] (1920) Clarendon Press
- Doctrine and Evangelism (1953) Epworth Press
- The Doctrine of the Holy Spirit: Four Lectures by Members of the Staff of Wesley College, Headingley coauthors Howard Watkin-Jones, Harold Roberts (1941) Epworth Press
- The Origin of the Markan Passion Sayings (1970) Epworth Press
- The First Draft of St. Luke's Gospel (1927) Society for Promoting Christian Knowledge
