= Origen and the History of Justification =

2008 book by Thomas Scheck

- Author: Thomas P. Scheck
- Language: English
- Genre: Classics
- Publisher: University of Notre Dame Press
- Publication date: 2008

Origen and the History of Justification: The Legacy of Origen's Commentary on Romans (2008) is a book by Thomas P. Scheck and published by University of Notre Dame Press. The book explores "the legacy of Origen’s [Commentary on Romans] in the West, focusing on its influence upon Pelagius, Augustine, William of St. Thierry, Erasmus of Rotterdam, Melanchthon, and post-Reformation controversies". Developed from Scheck's doctoral dissertation, the book received generally positive reviews.
