= Ransom theory of atonement =

Concept in Christian theology

The ransom theory of atonement is a theory in Christian theology relating to the process of Atonement in Christianity. It relates to the meaning and effect of the death of Jesus Christ. It was mostly popular between the 4th and 11th centuries, with little support in recent times. It originated in the early Church, particularly in the work of Origen. The theory teaches that the death of Christ was a ransom sacrifice, usually said to have been paid to Satan, in satisfaction for the bondage and debt on the souls of humanity as a result of inherited sin.

== New Testament on ransom ==
In Matthew 20:28, Jesus says "the Son of Man...came...to give his life as a ransom for many." 1 Timothy 2:6 states that Jesus "gave himself as ransom for all."

== Theological views of Christ as ransom ==
The ransom view can be summarized as follows:

Essentially, this theory claimed that Adam and Eve sold humanity over to the Devil at the time of the Fall; hence, it required that God pay the Devil a ransom to free us from the Devil's clutches. God, however, tricked the Devil into accepting Christ's death as a ransom, for the Devil did not realize that Christ could not be held in the bonds of death. Once the Devil accepted Christ's death as a ransom, this theory concluded, justice was satisfied and God was able to free us from Satan's grip.

— Robin Collins, Understanding Atonement: A New and Orthodox Theory

Augustine wrote the following to explain the theory:

The Redeemer came and the deceiver was overcome. What did our Redeemer do to our Captor? In payment for us He set the trap, His Cross, with His blood for bait. He [Satan] could indeed shed that blood; but he deserved not to drink it. By shedding the blood of One who was not his debtor, he was forced to release his debtors

— "Doctrine of the Atonement", Catholic Encyclopedia

However, Augustine's own stance on the issue is not entirely clear; his writings support both the ransom theory and the recapitulation theory of atonement at different times, perhaps indicating that he perceived both theories as compatible with each other.

"Redeeming" in this case literally means "buying back," and the ransoming of war captives from slavery was a common practice in the era. The theory was also based in part on Mark 10:45 and 1 Timothy 2:5–6, where Jesus and Paul mentioned the word "ransom" in the context of atonement. There were some who held different positions, however. The commentary on Romans attributed to Pelagius (who was declared a heretic, though for his view of grace, not his view of atonement) gives a description of the atonement which states that a person's sins have "sold them to death," and not to the devil, and that these sins alienate them from God, until Jesus, dying, ransomed people from death.

Writing in the 4th century, Athanasius of Alexandria proposed a theory of the atonement which similarly states that sin bears the consequence of death, that God warned Adam about this, and so, to remain consistent with himself must have Jesus die as Man's perfect prototype, or let humankind die mired in sin. This has some similarity to the satisfaction view, although Athanasius emphasized the fact that this death is effective because of our unity with Christ, rather than emphasizing a legal substitution or transfer of merits and that when Jesus descended into hades (variously, the underworld or hell, the abode of the dead) he eliminated death with his own death, since the power of death cannot hold God, Who is Life, captive.

Anselm, an 11th-century scholastic theologian and second Archbishop of Canterbury after the Norman conquest, argued against the then-current version of the ransom view, saying that Satan, being himself a rebel and outlaw, could never have a just claim against human beings. The Catholic Encyclopedia calls the idea that God must pay the Devil a ransom "certainly startling, if not revolting." Philosopher and theologian Keith Ward, among others, pointed out that, under the ransom view, not only was God a debtor but a deceiver as well, since God only pretended to pay the debt.

Others, such as Gustaf Aulén, have suggested that the meaning of the ransom theory should not be taken in terms of a business transaction (who receives payment), but rather as the emancipation of human beings from the bondage of sin and death. Aulén's book, Christus Victor, maintained that the Early Church view had been mischaracterized, and proposed a re-evaluated Ransom Theory as a superior alternative to Satisfaction Theory.

Anselm himself went on to explicate the satisfaction view of atonement, now espoused by the Catholic Church.

Presently the "ransom-to-Satan" view of atonement, literally interpreted, is not widely accepted in the West, except by some Anabaptist peace churches and a few figures in the Word of Faith movement, such as Kenneth Copeland.

The United States Conference of Catholic Bishops comments on Matthew 20:28 that the word ransom "does not necessarily express the idea of liberation by payment of some price. The cognate verb is used frequently in the LXX of God’s liberating Israel from Egypt or from Babylonia after the Exile; see Ex 6:6; 15:13; Ps 77:16 (76 LXX); Is 43:1; 44:22."

== In the Eastern Church ==
Origen of Alexandria, Gregory of Nyssa, and Augustine of Hippo taught views in line with the standard Ransom theory and the Liturgy of St. Basil the Great (celebrated ten times annually in the Byzantine Rite) speaks of Christ as a ransom unto death, other Church Fathers such as Gregory the Theologian vigorously denied that Christ was ransomed to Satan or any evil power, though he does not by any means deny that Christ was a ransom. In his Catechetical Orations, Cyril of Jerusalem suggests Christ's ransom was in fact paid to God the Father.

== In the Catholic Church ==
The Catechism of the Catholic Church, an authoritative summary of official Catholic teaching, describes the ransom paid by Christ at Calvary as a "mystery of universal redemption", but does not make any indication regarding to whom it was paid, or even that it was paid to any particular being at all.

== Protestantism ==
The alternative view arising in the Reformation, and argued by prominent reformers like Luther and Calvin, is penal substitution.

=== Lutheranism ===
Gustaf Aulén (1879–1977), a Swedish bishop in the Lutheran Church of Sweden, reinterpreted the ransom theory as a victory of Christ over the powers of evil, instead of as a ransom.

=== Adventism ===
In Adventism, all of humankind is considered to have inherited sin and death as a result of Adam's sin in the Garden of Eden. In this view, God's divine law requires that only the sacrificial death of a perfect human can atone for Adamic sin. Faith in the ransom of Jesus Christ—the Last Adam—is regarded as the only way to atone for sin and escape death. Jehovah's Witnesses and the Seventh-day Adventist Church are among the denominations that hold to this view.

== Sources ==
Primary sources

- Anselm (8 May 2008), "Cur Deus Homo", Anselm of Canterbury [Why the God Man?], Translated by Brian Davies & G R Evans, Oxford: Oxford University Press, pp. 260–356, ISBN 978-0-19-954008-2
- Athanasius (1 December 2011), On the Incarnation, Translated by John Behr, Yonkers: St Vladimirs Seminary Press, ISBN 978-0-88141-409-7
- Pelagius (1993), Pelagius's Commentary on St Paul's Epistle to the Romans, Translated by Theodore De Bruyn, Oxford: Clarendon Press, ISBN 978-0-19-814399-4

Secondary sources

- Collins, Robin (1995), Understanding Atonement: A New and Orthodox Theory, Grantham: Messiah College, archived from the original on 2011-04-10
- Hopko, Thomas (1972), The Orthodox Faith: Doctrine, vol. 1, Department of Religious Education, The Orthodox Church in America, ISBN 978-0-86642-036-5
- Kent, William (1907), "Doctrine of the Atonement", The Catholic Encyclopedia, vol. 2, New York: Robert Appleton Company
- Pugh, Ben (2015), Atonement Theories: A Way through the Maze, James Clarke & Co
- Romanides, John (2002), The Ancestral Sin, Translated by George Gabriel, Zephyr Pub., ISBN 978-0-9707303-1-2
