= Christus Victor =

Book regarding theories of atonement in Christianity

Christus Victor is a book by Gustaf Aulén published in English in 1931, presenting a study of theories of atonement in Christianity. The original Swedish title is Den kristna försoningstanken ("The Christian Idea of the Atonement") published in 1930. Aulén reinterpreted the classic ransom theory of atonement, which says that Christ's death is a ransom to the powers of evil, which had held humankind in their dominion. It is a model of the atonement that is dated to the Church Fathers, and it was the dominant theory of atonement for a thousand years, until Anselm of Canterbury supplanted it in the West with his satisfaction theory of atonement.

Aulén interpreted the ransom theory as a "victory over the powers which hold mankind in bondage: sin, death, and the devil." According to Pugh, "Ever since [Aulén's] time, we call these patristic ideas the Christus Victor way of seeing the cross." It is sometimes known as the fishhook theory of atonement, since Church Fathers such as Cyril of Alexandria and Gregory of Nyssa envisioned Christ as bait on a fishhook, luring Satan to take the bait and destroy himself.

== Aulen's book, Christus Victor ==
=== Atonement theories ===
In his book, Aulén identifies three main types of atonement theories:

- The earliest was what Aulén called the "classic" view of the atonement, more commonly known as the ransom theory, or since Aulén's work, it is known sometimes as the "Christus Victor" theory: this is the theory that Adam and Eve made humanity subject to the Devil during the fall, and that God, in order to redeem humanity, sent Christ as a "ransom" or "bait" so that the Devil, not knowing Christ could not die permanently, would kill him, and thus lose all right to humanity following the resurrection.
- A second theory is the "Latin" or "objective" view, more commonly known as satisfaction theory, beginning with Anselmian satisfaction (that Christ suffered as a substitute on behalf of humankind, satisfying the demands of God's honor) and later developed by Protestants as penal substitution (that Christ is punished instead of humanity, thus satisfying the demands of justice so that God can justly forgive).
- A third is the "subjective" theory, commonly known as the moral influence view, that Christ's passion was an act of exemplary obedience which affects the intentions of those who come to know about it. This view was put forward in opposition to Anselm's view by Peter Abelard.

Aulén argues that the "classic view" was the predominant view of the early church for the first thousand years of church history, and was supported by nearly every Church Father including Irenaeus, Origen of Alexandria, and Augustine of Hippo, to name a few. A major shift occurred, Aulén says, when Anselm of Canterbury published his Cur Deus Homo around 1097 AD which marked the point where the predominant understanding of the atonement shifted from the classic view to the satisfaction view in the Roman Catholic Church, and later within Protestantism. The Eastern Orthodox Church still holds to the atonement view put forward by Irenaeus called "recapitulation", wherein Jesus became what we are so that we could become what he is.

=== Christus Victor ===
Aulén argues that theologians have incorrectly concluded that the early Church Fathers held a ransom theory of atonement. Aulén argues that the Church Fathers' theory was not that the crucifixion was the payment of a ransom to the devil, but rather that it represented the liberation of humanity from the bondage of sin, death, and the devil. As the term Christus Victor (Christ the Victor) indicates, the idea of "ransom" should not be seen in terms (as Anselm did) of a business transaction, but more in the terms of a rescue or liberation of humanity from the slavery, and sickness, of sin.

==== Role of the Trinity ====
Aulén states that the chief distinction between Christus Victor and the satisfaction view is the contrary emphasis given to the Trinity and the Law. The satisfaction view, Aulén claims, contains a 'divine discontinuity' and a 'legal continuity' while Christus Victor emphasizes a 'divine continuity' and a 'legal discontinuity'. He points to the emerging theology of penance in the Latin Church as the root of Anselm's ideas, particularly in the writings of Cyprian. In Anselm's logical but revolutionary extension of penance theology, God is unable or unwilling to pardon humanity without having his Kingship honored by a payment of blood. Later, this would take the form of "penal substitution", the Reformation idea that God's justice, not his honor, is at stake in the atonement. Since only a man can fulfill mankind's obligations to the Law and to God, Christ must become a man in order to offer perfect penance to God. He does this by satisfying the demands of the Law for a sinless life and by suffering the wrath of the Father for past sins. Aulén takes exception to this model, arguing that the incarnation (and also the resurrection) becomes a legal exercise, a piece of a theological equation based on law theories.

Aulén goes on to argue that Christus Victor reverses this view by uniting Jesus and His Father during the Crucifixion in a subversive condemnation of the unjust powers of darkness. This is followed by the natural emphasis of Christus Victor: the Father's vindication of Jesus in his victorious and bodily resurrection. Advocates of the satisfaction view do not agree with Aulén's characterization, arguing that the satisfaction model does not, in fact, create opposition between the Father and the Son (there has been less disagreement on the "legal continuity" or emphasis of satisfaction atonement, although J.I. Packer has notably argued for a version of satisfaction theory with less legal emphasis). In their view, the "divine opposition" is only apparent since the Father desires reconciliation with mankind and Jesus willingly offers himself as a penal substitute. By contrast, Christus Victor depicts Christ's sacrifice, not as a legal offering to God in order to placate his justice, but as the decisive moment in a war against the powers of darkness; the law included.

==== Writings of the Church Fathers ====
Aulén points to the writings of Paul and the Church Fathers as examples of early Christianity's view of the Law as an enemy which must be defeated in order for mankind's salvation to be secured. He seeks to demonstrate that the penance systems of satisfaction theory and penal substitution place an undue emphasis on man's obligation to offer payment to God and on God's obligation to Law. Instead by suffering a death that, before the Law, meant an accursed status, Christ, instead of satisfying an obligation, overthrew the power of the Law, since its condemnation of a perfect man was unjust. Furthermore, death, sin, and the Devil (personalized forces in Christus Victor), are overthrown since Jesus' subsequent resurrection breaks the dominion they once held over human life. Since the resurrection is a mark of the Father's favor despite the Law's curse on crucified men, the atonement, far from reinforcing the Law, deprives and subverts the Law of its ability to condemn. Thus God the Father and God the Son are not set at odds by the cross with the first in the role of Judge and the second in the role of sinner, but are united in seeking the downfall of the Devil's system of sin, death, and Law that enslaves humanity. This view, Aulén maintains, keeps from the errors of penance systems emphasizing Law and man, and reveals the unity within the Trinity's redemptive plan and the freedom of the forgiveness shown to us by God through Christ.

==== The Incarnation ====
Unlike the satisfaction doctrine view of the atonement (the "Latin" view) which is rooted in the idea of Christ paying the penalty of sin to satisfy the demands of justice, the classic view of the Early church (Christus Victor) is rooted in the incarnation and how Christ entered into human misery and wickedness and thus redeemed it. Aulén argues that the Christus Victor view of the atonement is not so much a rational systematic theory as it is a drama, a passion story of God triumphing over the Powers and liberating humanity from the bondage of sin.

As Gustav Aulén writes: "The work of Christ is first and foremost a victory over the powers which hold mankind in bondage: sin, death, and the devil.

== Development of the Christus Victor view after Aulén ==
The Christus Victor theory is becoming increasingly popular with both paleo-orthodox evangelicals because of its connection to the early Church fathers, and with liberal Christians and peace churches such as the Anabaptist Mennonites because of its subversive nature, seeing the death of Jesus as an exposure of the cruelty and evil present in the worldly powers that rejected and killed him, and the resurrection as a triumph over these powers. As Marcus Borg writes,

for [the Christus Victor] view, the domination system, understood as something much larger than the Roman governor and the temple aristocracy, is responsible for the death of Jesus [...] The domination system killed Jesus and thereby disclosed its moral bankruptcy and ultimate defeat.

The Mennonite theologian J. Denny Weaver, in his book The Nonviolent Atonement and later in his essay "The Nonviolent Atonement: Human Violence, Discipleship and God", traces the further development of the Christus Victor theory (or as he calls it "Narrative Christus Victor") into the liberation theology of South America, as well as feminist and black theologies of liberation.
