= Cur Deus Homo =

1080s book by St. Anselm of Canterbury

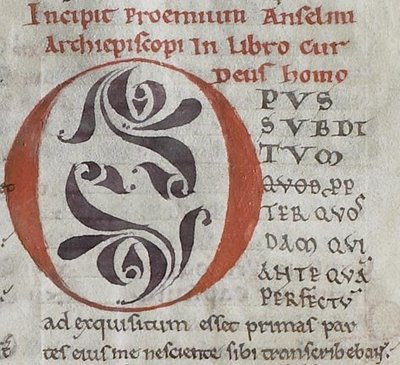
The beginning of the Cur Homo's prologue, from a 12th-century manuscript held at Lambeth Palace

Cur Deus Homo? (Latin for "Why [Was] God a Human?"), usually translated Why God Became Man, is a book written by Anselm of Canterbury in the period of 1094–1098. In this work he proposes the satisfaction view of the atonement.

The work contrasted with earlier redemptive thought in arguing against the notion of the devil's rights of possession over humanity. Anselm's argument in Cur Deus Homo was that the death of Christ was a 'payment' made by God to himself on behalf of man through the person of Christ.

The arguments Anselm pursued in Cur Deus Homo were to demonstrate the logical necessity of the incarnation and passion. This was not, however, to 'prove' Christian doctrine to allow for faith, but to confirm through logic what was held in faith: fides quaerens intellectum. As Anselm explained:

I have been often and most earnestly requested by many, both personally and by letter, that I would hand down in writing the proofs of a certain doctrine of our faith, which I am accustomed to give to inquirers; for they say that these proofs gratify them, and are considered sufficient. This they ask, not for the sake of attaining to faith by means of reason, but that they may be gladdened by understanding and meditating on those things which they believe; and that, as far as possible, they may be always ready to convince any one who demands of them a reason of that hope which is in us.
