= Satisfaction theory of atonement =

Christian theory of atonement

The satisfaction theory of atonement is a theory of the atonement which holds that Jesus Christ redeemed humanity through making satisfaction for humankind's disobedience through his own supererogatory obedience. The theory draws primarily from the works of Anselm of Canterbury, specifically his Cur Deus Homo ('Why Was God a Man?'). Since one of God's characteristics is justice, affronts to that justice must be atoned for. It is thus connected with the legal concept of balancing out an injustice.

Anselm regarded his satisfaction view of the atonement as a distinct improvement over the older ransom theory of atonement, which he saw as inadequate, due to its notion of a debt being owed to the devil. Anselm's theory was a precursor to the theology of later theologians like John Calvin, who taught the idea of Christ suffering the Father's just punishment as a vicarious substitute.

== Early development of the theory ==
The classic Anselmian formulation of the satisfaction view should be distinguished from penal substitution. Both are forms of satisfaction theory in that they speak of how Christ's death was satisfactory, but penal substitution and Anselmian satisfaction offer different understandings of how Christ's death was satisfactory. Anselm speaks of human sin as defrauding God of the honour he is due. Christ's death, the ultimate act of obedience, brings God great honour. As it was beyond the call of duty for Christ, it is more honour than he was obliged to give. Christ's surplus can therefore repay our deficit. Hence Christ's death is substitutionary; he pays the honour to the Father instead of our paying. Penal substitution differs in that it sees Christ's death not as repaying God for lost honour but rather paying the penalty of death that had always been the moral consequence for sin (e.g., Genesis 2:17; Romans 6:23). The key difference here is that for Anselm, satisfaction is an alternative to punishment, "it is necessary either that the honor taken away be repaid, or else that punishment follow." By Christ satisfying our debt of honor to God, we avoid punishment. In Calvinist penal substitution, it is the punishment which satisfies the demands of justice.

Another distinction must be made between penal substitution (Christ punished instead of us) and substitutionary atonement (Christ suffers for us). Both affirm the substitutionary and vicarious nature of the atonement, but penal substitution offers a specific explanation as to what the suffering is for: punishment.

Augustine teaches substitutionary atonement. However, the specific interpretation differed as to what this suffering for sinners meant. The early Church Fathers, including Athanasius and Augustine, taught that through Christ's suffering in humanity's place, he overcame and liberated us from death and the devil. Thus while the idea of substitutionary atonement is present in nearly all atonement theories, the specific idea of satisfaction and penal substitution are later developments in the Latin church.

== Anselm links the atonement and the incarnation ==
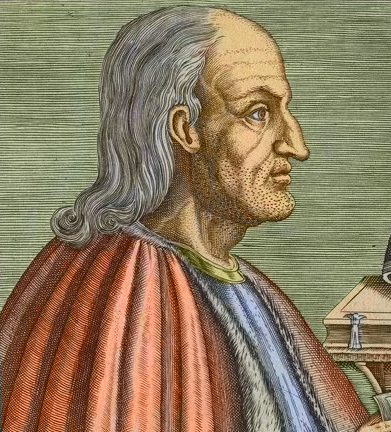
St. Anselm of Canterbury

Anselm of Canterbury first articulated the satisfaction view in his Cur Deus Homo?, as a modification to the ransom theory that was postulated at the time in the West. The then-current ransom theory of the atonement held that Jesus' death paid a ransom to Satan, allowing God to rescue those under Satan's bondage. For Anselm, this solution was inadequate. Why should the Son of God have to become a human to pay a ransom? Why should God owe anything at all to Satan?

Instead, Anselm suggested that we owe God a debt of honor: "This is the debt which man and angel owe to God, and no one who pays this debt commits sin; but every one who does not pay it sins. This is justice, or uprightness of will, which makes a being just or upright in heart, that is, in will; and this is the sole and complete debt of honor which we owe to God, and which God requires of us." Having failed to render to God this debt, it is not enough to restore the justice originally owed, but the offense to God's honor must be satisfied, too. "Moreover, so long as he does not restore what he has taken away, he remains in fault; and it will not suffice merely to restore what has been taken away, but, considering the contempt offered, he ought to restore more than he took away." This debt creates an imbalance in the moral universe; God cannot simply ignore it according to Anselm. The only way to satisfy the debt was for a being of infinite greatness, acting as a man on behalf of men, to repay the debt of justice owed to God and satisfy the injury to divine honor. In light of this view, the "ransom" that Jesus mentions in the Gospels would be a sacrifice and a debt paid only to God the Father.

Anselm did not speak directly to the later Calvinist concern for the scope of the satisfaction for sins, whether it was paid for all mankind universally or only for limited individuals, but indirectly his language suggests the former. Thomas Aquinas later specifically attributes a universal scope to this atonement theory in keeping with previous Catholic dogma, as do Lutherans at the time of the Reformation.

== Thomas Aquinas ==
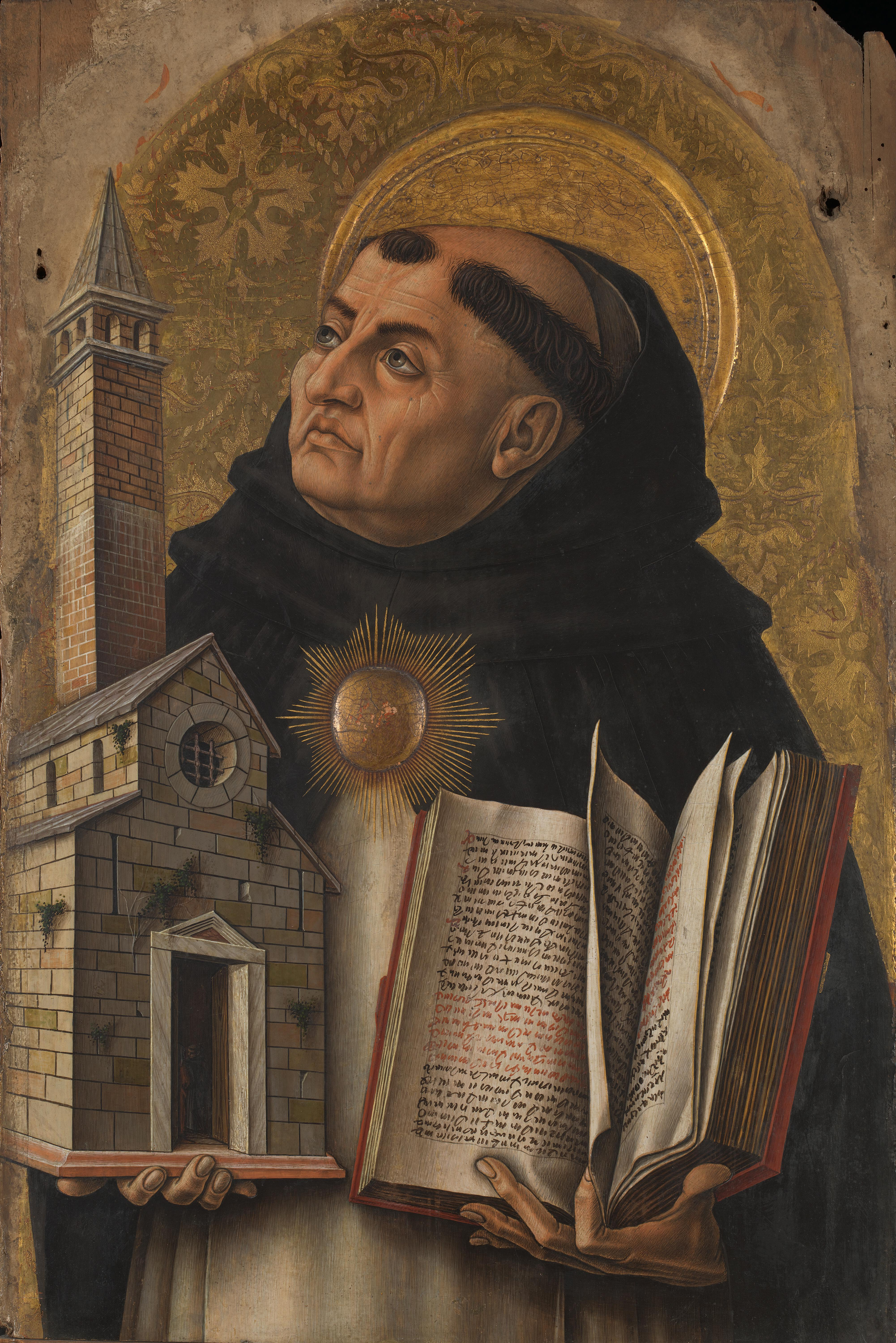
St. Thomas Aquinas

Thomas Aquinas considers the atonement in the Summa Theologiae, developing the now-standard Catholic understanding of atonement. For Aquinas, the main obstacle to human salvation lies in sinful human nature, which damns human beings unless it is repaired or restored by the atonement. In his section on man, he considers whether punishment is good and appropriate. He concludes that:

1. punishment is a morally good response to sin: it is a kind of medicine for sin, and aims at the restoration of friendship between the wrongdoer and the one wronged.
2. "Christ bore a satisfactory punishment, not for His, but for our sins".
3. Atonement is possible by metaphysical union, "The head and members are as one mystic person; and therefore Christ's satisfaction belongs to all the faithful as being His members. Also, in so far as any two men are one in charity, the one can atone for the other as shall be shown later" The offender joins himself metaphysically, via baptism, to the one (Christ) undergoing punishment.

In his section on the Incarnation, Aquinas argues that Christ's death satisfies the penalty owed by sin, and that it was Christ's Passion specifically that was needed to pay the debt of man's sin. For Aquinas, the Passion of Jesus provided the merit needed to pay for sin: "Consequently Christ by His Passion merited salvation, not only for Himself, but likewise for all His members," and that the atonement consisted in Christ's giving to God more "than was required to compensate for the offense of the whole human race." So, Aquinas believes that the atonement is God's solution to two problems. Christ's passion and death, insofar as they serve to make satisfaction, are the solution to the problem of past sin; and, insofar as Christ merits grace by his passion and death, they are the solution to the problem of future sin. In this way, Aquinas articulated the formal beginning of the idea of a superabundance of merit, which became the basis for the Catholic concept of the treasury of merit. Aquinas also articulated the ideas of salvation that are now standard within the Catholic Church: that justifying grace is provided through the sacraments; that the condign merit of our actions is matched by Christ's merit from the treasury of merit; and that sins can be classified as mortal or venial.

This sounds like penal substitution, but Aquinas is careful to say that he does not mean this to be taken in legal terms:

"If we speak of that satisfactory punishment, which one takes upon oneself voluntarily, one may bear another's punishment…. If, however, we speak of punishment inflicted on account of sin, inasmuch as it is penal, then each one is punished for his own sin only, because the sinful act is something personal. But if we speak of a punishment that is medicinal, in this way it does happen that one is punished for another's sin."

— Thomas Aquinas

What he means by "satisfactory punishment," as opposed to punishment that is "penal," is essentially the Catholic idea of penance. Aquinas refers to the practice saying, "A satisfactory punishment is imposed upon penitents" and defines this idea of "Satisfactory Punishment" (penance) as a compensation of self-inflicted pain in equal measure to the pleasure derived from the sin. "Punishment may equal the pleasure contained in a sin committed."

Aquinas sees penance as having two functions. First to pay a debt, and second "to serve as a remedy for the avoidance of sin". In this later case he says that "as a remedy against future sin, the satisfaction of one does not profit another, for the flesh of one man is not tamed by another's fast" and again "one man is not freed from guilt by another's contrition." According to Aquinas "Christ bore a satisfactory punishment, not for His, but for our sins." The penance Christ did has its effect in paying the "debt of punishment" incurred by our sin.

This is a concept similar to Anselm's that humans owe a debt of honor to God, with a critical difference: While Anselm said we could never pay this because any good we could do was owed to God anyway, Aquinas says that in addition to our due of obedience we can make up for our debt through acts of penance "man owes God all that he is able to give him...over and above which he can offer something by way of satisfaction". Unlike Anselm, Aquinas claims that we can make satisfaction for our own sin, and that our problem is not our personal sin, but original sin. "Original sin...is an infection of human nature itself, so that, unlike actual sin, it could not be expiated by the satisfaction of a mere man." Thus Christ, as the "second Adam," does penance in our place – paying the debt of our original sin.

== Calvin attributes atonement to individuals ==
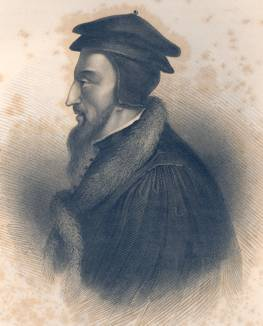
John Calvin

John Calvin was one of the first systematic theologians of the Reformation. As such, he wanted to solve the problem of Christ's atonement in a way that he saw as just to the Scriptures and Church Fathers, rejecting the need for condign merit. His solution was that Christ's death on the cross paid not a general penalty for humanity's sins, but a specific penalty for the sins of individual people. That is, when Jesus died on the cross, his death paid the penalty at that time for the sins of all those who are saved (past, present, and future). One obviously necessary feature of this idea is that Christ's atonement is limited in its effect only to those whom God has chosen to be saved, since the debt for sins was paid at a particular point in time (at the crucifixion).

For Calvin, this also required drawing on Augustine's earlier theory of predestination. Additionally, in rejecting the idea of penance, Calvin shifted from Aquinas' idea that satisfaction was penance (which focused on satisfaction as a change in humanity), to the idea of satisfying God's wrath. This ideological shift places the focus on a change in God, who is propitiated through Christ's death. The Calvinist understanding of the atonement and satisfaction is penal substitution: Christ is a substitute taking our punishment and thus satisfying the demands of justice and appeasing God's wrath so that God can justly show grace.

John Stott has stressed that this must be understood not as the Son placating the Father, but rather in Trinitarian terms of the Godhead initiating and carrying out the atonement, motivated by a desire to save humanity. Thus the key distinction of penal substitution is the idea that restitution is made through punishment.

Hence, for Calvin, one is saved by becoming united to Christ through faith. At the point of becoming united with Christ through faith, one receives all the benefits of the atonement. However, because Christ paid for sins when he died, it is not possible for those for whom he died to fail to receive the benefits: the saved are predestined to believe.

== See also ==
- Accord and satisfaction
- Christus Victor
- Justification (theology)
- Moral influence theory of atonement
- Soteriology
