= Condign and congruent merit =

Aspect of Roman Catholic theology signifying merit with the dignity of Christ

Condign merit (meritum de condigno) and congruent merit (or congruous merit, meriturm de congruo) refer to two kinds of merit in Catholic theology. Condign merit, which is merit in the proper sense, refers to God's obligation to fulfill his promise to reward man's good works. Congruent merit, on the other hand, refers to the rewards that God gives men for reasons of fittingness or mercy, but apart from any obligation. As the Catholic Encyclopedia explains, "Condign merit supposes an equality between service and return; it is measured by commutative justice (justitia commutativa), and thus gives a real claim to a reward. Congruous merit, owing to its inadequacy and the lack of intrinsic proportion between the service and the recompense, claims a reward only on the ground of equity." Whenever merit precedes grace, it is called congruent merit.

== Comparisons ==
Congruent merit is the equivalent of condign merit but applied to an unregenerated person by the goodness of God. In the first case, God has obligated himself, by his promises to reward His Son's merits in his children. In the second case, God bestows his merit to those who seek him in faith not from obligation but from mercy and love. In neither case is God obligated by the human. In the first case, God is obligated by his promises to those who love him. In the second, God is obligated by his love and mercy to his creatures who obey him.

In some formulations of Calvinism, condign merit is not needed because Jesus' atonement is a congruent merit given by God.

Condign merit supposes an equality between service and return; it is measured by commutative justice, and thus gives a real claim to a reward in the name of Christ. Congruous merit, owing to its inadequacy and the lack of intrinsic proportion between the service and the recompense, claims a reward only on the ground of equity. This early-scholastic distinction and terminology, which is already recognized in concept and substance by the Fathers of the Church in their controversies with the Pelagians and Semipelagians, was again emphasized by Johann Eck, the adversary of Martin Luther.

The essential difference between condign merit and congruent merit is based on the fact that, besides those works which claim a remuneration under pain of violating strict justice (as in contracts between employer and employee, in buying and selling, etc.), there are also other meritorious works which at most are entitled to reward or honour for reasons of equity or mere distributive justice, as in the case of gratuities and military decorations. From an ethical point of view the difference practically amounts to this that, if the reward due to condign merit be withheld, there is a violation of right and justice and the consequent obligation in conscience to make restitution, while, in the case of congruous merit, to withhold the reward involves no violation of right and no obligation to restore, it being merely an offence against what is fitting or a matter of personal discrimination. Hence the reward of congruous merit always depends in great measure on the kindness and liberality of the giver, though not purely and simply on his good will.

== Criticism of condign merit ==
In his 1532 Commentary on the Sermon of the Mount, Martin Luther criticized Catholic doctrine concerning condign merit. He noted that while the reward one gains from condign merit is much greater than that of congruent merit, the sort of good works said to attain each type of merit is similar. Luther thought it did not make sense that the two types of merit could be gained by similar actions when the benefit of condign merit is so much greater than the benefit of congruent merit.

== See also ==
- Atonement in Christianity
- Justification (theology)
- Merit (Christianity)
