= Moral influence theory of atonement =

Theory in Christian theology

The moral influence or moral example theory of atonement, is theory relating to the crucifixion of Jesus Christ in Christianity, developed or most notably propagated by Abelard (1079–1142). (Note: Pugh notes that "the very earliest Patristic writings [...] lean towards a moralistic interpretation of the cross, but rejects the idea that this constituted a full-fledged theory of moral influence of atonement. He mentions A. J. Wallace and R. D. Rusk (2011), Moral Transformation: The Original Christian Paradigm of Salvation as a "recent attempt to prove at length that 'moral transformation' was 'the original Christian paradigm of salvation.' This work consists of a totally one-sided presentation of biblical and historical data". According to Beilby and Eddy, subjective theories, of which Abelard's is one, emphasize God's love for humanity, and focus on changing man's attitude. According to Beilby and Eddy, "[a]ny New Testament text that proclaims God's love for humanity and consequent desire to save sinners can be brought forth as evidence for this interpretation of the atonement.") An alternative to Anselm of Canterbury's satisfaction theory of atonement, Abelard focused on changing man's perception of God as not offended, harsh, and judgmental, but as loving. According to Abelard, "Jesus died as the demonstration of God's love", a demonstration which can change the hearts and minds of the sinners, turning them back to God.

== Doctrine ==
=== Abelard ===
It was not until Anselm, with his satisfaction theory of atonement, that a theory of atonement was specifically articulated. The moral influence theory was developed, or most notably propagated, by Abelard (1079–1142), as an alternative to Anselm's satisfaction theory.

Abelard not only rejected the idea of Jesus' death as a ransom paid to the devil, which turned the Devil into a rival god, but also objected to the idea that Jesus' death was a "debt paid to God's honor". He also objected to the emphasis on God's judgment, and the idea that God changed his mind after the sinner accepted Jesus' sacrificial death, which was not easily reconcilable with the idea of "the perfect, impassible God [who] does not change". Abelard focused on changing man's perception of God as not offended, harsh, and judgmental, but as loving. According to Abelard, "Jesus died as the demonstration of God's love", a demonstration which can change the hearts and minds of the sinners, turning them back to God.

Abelard's views on atonement were challenged by Bernard of Clairvaux, who, on the basis of exemplarism, charged Abelard with Pelagianism. While this critique can be questioned, elements of Pelagianism can still be found in Abelard. Beilby and Eddy note that Abelard was “condemned by the Council of Sens (1140), and eventually excommunicated. His general approach to the atonement, however, has lived on in various forms throughout the last millennium”.

=== Moral example theory ===
A related theory, the "moral example theory", was developed by Faustus Socinus (1539–1604) in his work De Jesu Christo servatore (1578). He rejected the idea of "vicarious satisfaction". (Note: Christ suffering for, or punished for, the sinners.) According to Socinus, Jesus' death offers mankind "a perfect example of self-sacrificial dedication to God".

A number of theologians see "example" (or "exemplar") theories of the atonement as variations of the moral influence theory. Wayne Grudem, however, argues that "Whereas the moral influence theory says that Christ's death teaches us how much God loves us, the example theory says that Christ's death teaches us how we should live". Grudem identifies the Socinians as supporters of the example theory.

== Influence on Reformation thought ==
During the Protestant Reformation in Western Christianity, the majority of the Reformers strongly rejected the moral influence view of the atonement in favour of penal substitution, a highly forensic modification of the honor-oriented Anselmian satisfaction model. Fausto Sozzini's Socinian arm of the Reformation maintained a belief in the moral influence view of the atonement. Socinianism was an early form of Unitarianism, and the Unitarian Church today maintains a moral influence view of the atonement, as do many liberal Protestant theologians of the modern age.

During the 18th century, versions of the moral influence view found overwhelming support among German theologians, most notably the Enlightenment philosopher Immanuel Kant. In the 19th and 20th century, it has been popular among liberal Protestant thinkers in the Anglican, Methodist, Lutheran and Presbyterian churches, including the Anglican theologian Hastings Rashdall. A number of English theological works in the last hundred years have advocated and popularized the moral influence theory of atonement.

A strong division has remained since the Reformation between liberal Protestants (who typically adopt a moral influence view) and conservative Protestants (who typically adopt the penal substitution theory). Both sides tend to believe that their position is taught by the Bible. (Note: Advocates of the moral influence view point to: The large volume of teaching in the Gospels focused on morality.; The large quantity of moral exhortation in the New Testament letters.; The 30+ New Testament passages referring to final judgment that all appear to depict a final judgment according to moral conduct.; The numerous passages throughout the New Testament which encourage moral change and provide the goal of passing God's final judgment as the incentive.; The various passages in the New Testament letters which speak of the effect of Jesus' life and death on us in terms of moral change.; Those opposed to the moral influence view have typically pointed to the following biblical themes: The numerous passages throughout the gospels which teach the necessity of faith in salvation.; The numerous passages throughout the gospels which describe salvation as the result of faith.; The large volume of teaching in the New Testament epistles that describe salvation as a result of faith.; The numerous passages speaking of the effects of Christ's death, often using language from the Jewish sacrificial system.; The various passages throughout the New Testament that teach the impossibility of salvation through moral works.)
