= Recapitulation theory of atonement =

Theory of the atonement first clearly expressed by Irenaeus

The recapitulation theory of the atonement is an idea in Christian theology related to the meaning and effect of the death of Jesus Christ.

While it is sometimes absent from summaries of atonement theories, more comprehensive overviews of the history of the atonement doctrine typically include a section about the "recapitulation" view of the atonement, which was first clearly formulated by Irenaeus of Lyons. (Note: Attributed to multiple sources:)

One of the main New Testament scriptures upon which this view is based states: "[God's purpose is, in] the fulness of the times, to sum up all things in Christ, the things in the heavens, and the things upon the earth..." (Ephesians 1:10, RV). The Greek word for 'sum up' (ἀνακεφαλαιώσασθαι, anakephalaiosasthai) was literally rendered 'to recapitulate' in Latin.

In the recapitulation view of the atonement, Christ is seen as the new Adam who succeeds where Adam failed. Christ undoes the wrong that Adam did and, because of his union with humanity, leads humankind on to eternal life (including moral perfection).

Through man's disobedience the process of the evolution of the human race went wrong, and the course of its wrongness could neither be halted nor reversed by any human means. But in Jesus Christ the whole course of human evolution was perfectly carried out and realised in obedience to the purpose of God.

– William Barclay

== History ==
As highlighted above, Irenaeus is considered to be the first to clearly express a recapitulation view of the atonement, although he is anticipated by Justin Martyr, whom Irenaeus quotes in Against Heresies 4.6.2:

In his book against Marcion, Justin does well say: "I would not have believed the Lord Himself, if He had announced any other than He who is our framer, maker, and nourisher. But because the only-begotten Son came to us from the one God, who both made this world and formed us, and contains and administers all things, summing up His own handiwork in Himself, my faith towards Him is steadfast, and my love to the Father immoveable, God bestowing both upon us." [Emphasis added]

There follow two representative quotes from Irenaeus:

[Christ] was in these last days, according to the time appointed by the Father, united to His own workmanship, inasmuch as He became a man liable to suffering ... He commenced afresh^{1} the long line of human beings, and furnished us, in a brief, comprehensive manner, with salvation; so that what we had lost in Adam—namely, to be according to the image and likeness of God—that we might recover in Christ Jesus.

^{1} So the Syriac. The Latin has, "in seipso recapitulavit," He summed up in Himself.

He has therefore, in His work of recapitulation, summed up all things, both waging war against our enemy, and crushing him who had at the beginning led us away captives in Adam ...the enemy would not have been fairly vanquished, unless it had been a man [born] of woman who conquered him. ... And therefore does the Lord profess Himself to be the Son of man, comprising in Himself that original man out of whom the woman was fashioned, in order that, as our species went down to death through a vanquished man, so we may ascend to life again through a victorious one; and as through a man death received the palm [of victory] against us, so again by a man we may receive the palm against death.

For Irenaeus, the ultimate goal of Christ's work of solidarity with humankind is to make humankind divine. Of Jesus he says, he "became what we are, that He might bring us to be even what He is Himself". This idea has been most influential in the Eastern Christianity, particularly within the Eastern Orthodox Church, having been taken on by many other Church Fathers, such as St. Athanasius, Gregory of Nazianzus, Augustine, and Maximus the Confessor. This Eastern Orthodox theological development out of the recapitulation view of the atonement is called theosis ("deification").

A more contemporary, slightly differing expression of the recapitulation view can be seen in D. E. H. Whiteley's reading of Paul the Apostle's theology. Whiteley favourably quotes Irenaeus' notion that Christ 'became what we are, that He might bring us to be even what He is Himself', although he never describes Paul's view of the atonement as a recapitulation; rather, he uses the word 'participation':

...if St. Paul can be said to hold a theory of the modus operandi [of the atonement], it is best described as one of salvation through participation: Christ shared all our experience, sin alone excepted, including death, in order that we, by virtue of our solidarity with him, might share his life.
