= Mildred Bangs Wynkoop =

American theologian (1905–1997)

- Born: 9 September 1905
- Died: 21 May 1997 (aged 91)
- Notable work: A Theology of Love
- Theological work
- Tradition or movement: Wesleyan

Mildred Olive Bangs Wynkoop (September 9, 1905, in Seattle, Washington – May 21, 1997, in Lenexa, Kansas) was an ordained minister in the Church of the Nazarene, who served as an educator, missionary, theologian, and the author of several books. Donald Dayton indicates that "Probably most influential for a new generation of Holiness scholars has been the work of Nazarene theologian Mildred Bangs Wynkoop, especially her book A Theology of Love: The Dynamic of Wesleyanism. The Wynkoop Center for Women in Ministry located in Kansas City, Missouri, is named in her honour. The Timothy L. Smith and Mildred Bangs Wynkoop Book Award of the Wesleyan Theological Society also jointly honours her "outstanding scholarly contributions."

== Personal life ==
Mildred Olive Bangs was born on 9 September 1905 in Seattle, Washington, the daughter of Carl Oliver Bangs (born in Mandal, Norway) and Mery Dupertuis (born in Ollon, Canton de Vaud, Switzerland), both immigrants to the United States. She is the older sister of theologian Carl Bangs (born 5 April 1922 in Seattle, Washington; died 7 July 2002), the author of Arminius: A Study in the Dutch Reformation (New York and Nashville: Abingdon Press, 1971; rev, ed. 1985); and also of Bernice Bangs Morgan, a former evangelist and Methodist home missions pastor in Alaska, who was at one time "the only woman minister in Alaska", and author of The Very Thought of Thee: Adventures of an Arctic Missionary (1952). She had three other sisters.

Wynkoop's parents met Phineas Bresee, General Superintendent of the Church of the Nazarene on their honeymoon and became charter members of Seattle First Church of the Nazarene. Mildred Bangs entered Northwest Nazarene College; two years later, she went to Pasadena College where she met her future husband, fellow student Ralph Carl Wynkoop. On 27 December 1928 Mildred and Ralph were married at the Central Church of the Nazarene in Seattle, Washington. Several ministers officiated at the wedding, including Rev. Alpin Bowes, pastor of the church, and Rev. Elsie Wallace, the first woman ordained by Phineas Bresee in the Church of the Nazarene. Their first home was Pasadena, California, where they were students at Pasadena College.

== Education ==
Wynkoop initially studied at Northwest Nazarene College in Nampa, Idaho, where she was a student of Nazarene theologian H. Orton Wiley and biblical scholar Olive Winchester. After Wiley resigned to become president of Pasadena College (now Point Loma Nazarene University), she transferred also to Pasadena College, where she received her A.B. and Th.B. degrees in 1931. She earned a Bachelor of Divinity (B.D.) degree from Western Evangelical Seminary (now George Fox Evangelical Seminary) in 1952. Her thesis was entitled "A Biblical Study of Man in His Relationship to the Image of God." Additionally, she earned a M.Sc. from the University of Oregon in 1953; and a Doctorate in Theology (Th.D.) from Northern Baptist Theological Seminary in 1955. Her thesis was entitled "A Historical and Semantic Analysis of Methods of Biblical Interpretation as They Relate to Views of Inspiration."

== Ministry ==
Influenced by early role models like Rev. Mrs. Elsie Wallace, a pastor of Seattle First Church of the Nazarene and briefly superintendent of the Northwest District of the Church of the Nazarene, and by Olive Winchester, theologian and academic dean at Northwest Nazarene College, Wynkoop walked through the doors of ministry that opened to her.

=== Pastoral Ministry and Evangelism ===
For about 20 years, until they decided that Mildred would begin graduate studies, the Wynkoops served together as co-pastors or full-time itinerant evangelists. They were co-pastors of the Glassell Park Church of the Nazarene in Los Angeles for four years until her graduation from Pasadena College in 1931, before pastoring the Church of the Nazarene at Ojai, California, for a year. Their next pastorate was for four years at Marshfield, Oregon (now Coos Bay). During this pastorate, Mildred was ordained in 1934 as an elder in the Church of the Nazarene by John W. Goodwin, General Superintendent in the Church of the Nazarene, and Ralph was ordained in 1935 by General Superintendent Roy T. Williams.

Ralph and Mildred spent the next five years travelling as evangelists, mostly on the West Coast. They moved to Portland, Oregon, to serve the Brentwood Church of the Nazarene for nine years. When Mildred enrolled in doctoral studies in Chicago, Illinois, Ralph returned to evangelistic ministry.

=== Educational Ministry ===
Wynkoop's first teaching assignment was at Western Evangelical Seminary (now George Fox Evangelical Seminary) in Portland, Oregon, where she served as Professor of Theology from 1956 to December 1960. From 1961 to 1966 she taught in Japan where she was the founding President of Japan Nazarene Theological Seminary, and briefly in Taiwan. From 1966 to 1976 she served as Professor of Theology and Director of the Department of Missions at Trevecca Nazarene College (now Trevecca Nazarene University) in Nashville, Tennessee. From 1976 to 1979 Wynkoop was the Theologian-in-Residence at Nazarene Theological Seminary in Kansas City, Missouri.

== Theology ==
Wynkoop's theology has been described as "relational theology" by Michael Lodahl. Wynkoop's theological agenda was shaped initially by H. Orton Wiley, "America's leading exponent of Arminian theology".

Wiley understood that the Nazarenes were oriented to the Protestant Reformation through the Anglican tradition. Stimulated by Wiley, Wynkoop's brother, Carl Bangs, became a world authority on the Dutch reformer James Arminius and Arminianism's spread in England and America. Her interests, however, focused on John Wesley and his relevance for theological life today.

In John Wesley: Christian Revolutionary (1970) Wynkoop showed how the Wesleyan tradition's founder held together two strains torn apart by American fundamentalism: personal piety and social compassion. She urged a return to Wesley's classic formulation. She provided an account of her church's basic theology in Foundations of Wesleyan-Arminian Theology(1967).

Six years of missionary service in Taiwan and Japan stimulated Wynkoop's creative thinking on how to best communicate the theology of holiness—a process that resulted in her 1973 magnum opus A Theology of Love, a reinterpretation of the Wesleyan message for her time. Wynkoop was also influenced by the process theology of Daniel Day Williams. In A Theology of Love, she questioned the terminology of a "second work of grace." She taught sin was not a substance to be eradicated, but a wrong relationship with God. Wynkoop taught the decisive moment of salvation was justification and that believers received the Holy Spirit at that time. She did not connect the baptism of the Spirit with entire sanctification. Wynkoop advocated:

Ontological trichotomy, a recent revival of Gnostic thought in some Christian circles, undermines a concept of the unity of personality so basically assumed in Hebrew thought. It raises no barriers to-in fact it actually suggests and encourages-a virtual depersonalizing of the self. If man is only the sum of so many entities, he is simply an aggregate of selves, a split personality, a double mind; not a responsible, valid, centralized self. Any pluralistic concept of personality destroys the foundation of biblical holiness which is characterized by love, and which is a wholly personal quality capable of being experienced, truly, only by a unified person.

It has always been the most profound conviction of Wesleyanism that the Bible speaks to the moral relationships of men and not about sub-rational, non-personal areas of the self. Sin is basically self-separation from God, not in measurable distance but in moral unlikeness and spiritual alienation. Holiness is moral to the core -love to God and man-qualities of the self in relation to the person of God and of men.

Love is the gospel message. Christian love, revealed by God in Christ, is the correction of man's limited, selfish, selective, perverted love. It stands against any human concept of love projected into a theory of God's nature and His way with man. It is precisely this unlimited, impartial, indestructible love that needed to be "revealed" because the best in human love has been limited. The very nature of sin is love's perversion which makes the self the object of its own dedication. Could the dogma of particular election as understood by some theological traditions be the projection of faulty human love into the very nature of God? The gospel was not born in human philosophy but in God's heart revealed in Christ. This Wesley declared.

Holiness and love are two different words for two different things. In the realm of formal definition each is distinct. They cannot be interchangeably used in any one context. But this is in the realm of words as words. In the realm of existential meaning something of their relatedness begins to come through. But it would be inaccurate to say they are "related." To say holiness and love are not identical but related would imply that they were associated in experience but not vitally and essentially connected in life. It would say that each has an autonomy apart from the other. Somewhat in the sense that a house and a home, a person and a lawyer, an institution and a school can be equated, holiness and love can also be ... When holiness and love are put together, the analogy of the two sides of a coin would be closer to the truth. Neither side can be both sides at the same time. Sides are not to be equated, but the obverse side is as essential to its existence as the face. Love is the essential inner character of holiness, and holiness does not exist apart from love. That is how close they are, and in a certain sense they can be said to be the same thing. At least Wesley consistently defined holiness, as well as perfection, as love.

Wynkoop wrote "an admirable college history in The Trevecca Story, beginning with an analysis of the school's theological roots."

== Publications ==
=== Books ===
- Wynkoop, Mildred Bangs (1955). An Existential Interpretation of the Doctrine of Holiness: A Message Presented in Chapel Service. Western Evangelical Seminary.
- Wynkoop, Mildred Bangs (1970). John Wesley: Christian Revolutionary. Kansas City, MO: Beacon Hill Press.
- Wynkoop, Mildred Bangs (1960). Wesleyan-Arminianism and mild-Calvinism distinctions : classroom lectures. Taichung, Taiwan: Central Taiwan Theological College.
- Wynkoop, Mildred Bangs (1967). Foundations of Wesleyan-Arminian Theology. Kansas City, MO: Beacon Hill Press.
- Wynkoop, Mildred Bangs (1972). A Theology of Love: The Dynamic of Wesleyanism (PDF). Kansas City, MO: Beacon Hill Press.
- Wynkoop, Mildred Bangs (1976). The Occult and the Supernatural (PDF). Kansas City, MO: Beacon Hill Press.
- Wynkoop, Mildred Bangs (1976). The Trevecca Story: 75 Years of Christian Service. Nashville: Trevecca Press.

=== Theses ===
- Wynkoop, Mildred Bangs (1952). A Biblical Study of Man in His Relationship to the Image of God [B. D.]. Western Evangelical Seminary.
- Wynkoop, Mildred Bangs (1955). A historical and semantic analysis of methods of Biblical interpretation as they relate to views of inspiration [Th. D.]

=== Articles ===
Wynkoop published articles in The Wesleyan Theological Journal, The Asbury Seminarian, Sanctification and Biblical Theology, Theological Trends, Preachers' Magazine, Herald of Holiness, Light and Life, and The Seminary Tower. Among her published articles are:

- Wynkoop, Mildred Bangs (1958). "Sanctification is Existential". The Preacher's Magazine.
- Wynkoop, Mildred Bangs (1958). "Love is Existential". The Preacher's Magazine.
- Wynkoop, Mildred Bangs (1958). "Practical Norm of Love". The Preacher's Magazine.
- Wynkoop, Mildred Bangs (1963). "Paul Tillich's Interpretation of History". Theological Trends.
- Wynkoop, Mildred Bangs (1964). "John Wesley's Philosophy of Faith". Theological Trends.
- Wynkoop, Mildred Bangs (1966). "Protestant Theology and the Imago Dei". Theological Trends.
- Wynkoop, Mildred Bangs (1967). "The Wedge of Truth". Published Reformation Day Sermons. Trevecca Nazarene College: 30–31.
- Wynkoop, Mildred Bangs (1968). "The Communion of the Holy Spirit" (PDF). Wesleyan Theological Journal. 3 (1).
- Wynkoop, Mildred Bangs (1969). "A Wesleyan View on Preaching Holiness" (PDF). Wesleyan Theological Journal. 4 (1).
- Wynkoop, Mildred Bangs (1970). "Book Review: Christmas Traditions". Records of the American Catholic Historical Society of Philadelphia. 81 (2): 127–128. JSTOR 44210736.
- Wynkoop, Mildred Bangs (1971). "A Hermeneutical Approach to John Wesley" (PDF). Wesleyan Theological Journal. 6 (1).
- Wynkoop, Mildred Bangs (1975). "John Wesley: Mentor or Guru?" (PDF). Wesleyan Theological Journal. 10 (1): 5–14.
- Wynkoop, Mildred Bangs (1976). "Wesleyan Theology and Christian Development". The Asbury Seminarian.
- Wynkoop, Mildred Bangs (1976). "Theology's Role in the Christian Ministry". The Seminary Tower. Nazarene Theological Seminary.
- Wynkoop, Mildred Bangs (1979). "Theological Roots of the Wesleyan Understanding of the Holy Spirit" (PDF). Wesleyan Theological Journal. 14 (1): 77–98.

== Notes and references ==
=== Sources ===
- Blevins, Dean G. (2019). "Introduction". Didache: Faithful Teaching. 18 (2). Church of the Nazarene.
- Dayton, Donlald W. (1979). "The Holiness and Pentecostal Churches: Emerging from Cultural Isolation". The Christian Century. Vol. 786. Chicago. pp. 15–22.
- WTS (1999). "Timothy L. Smith And Mildred Bangs Wynkoop Book Award" (PDF). Wesleyan Theological Society.
- TUCM (2002). "Alumni Deaths". The University of Chicago Magazine. Chicago.
- COTN (2019). "Carl O. Bangs". Church of the Nazarene.
- Bangs Morgan, Bernice (1952). The Very Thought of Thee: Adventures of an Arctic Missionary. Grand Rapids: Zondervan Publishing House.
- HT (2005). "Mildred Bangs Wynkoop". Holiness Today. Lenexa, KS: General Board of the Church of the Nazarene.
- Reed, Gerard (2004). "151 Powell & Lodahl: PLNU Theologians".
- Culp, John (2001). "From Criticism to Mutual Transformation? The Dialogue Between Process and Evangelical Theologies". Process Studies. 30 (2). Claremont, CA: Center for Process Studies: 132–146. doi:10.5840/process200130118. S2CID 155798478.
- Quanstrom, Mark R. (2004). A Century of Holiness Theology: The Doctrine of Entire Sanctification in the Church of the Nazarene: 1905 to 2004. Kansas City: Beacon Hill Press. Archived from the original on 2017-04-21.
- Wynkoop, Mildred Bangs (1952). A Biblical Study of Man in His Relationship to the Image of God [B. D.]. Western Evangelical Seminary.
- Wynkoop, Mildred Bangs (1967). Foundations of Wesleyan-Arminian Theology. Kansas City, MO: Beacon Hill Press.
- Wynkoop, Mildred Bangs (1955). A historical and semantic analysis of methods of Biblical interpretation as they relate to views of inspiration [Th. D.] OCLC 9692808.
- Wynkoop, Mildred Bangs (1972). A Theology of Love: The Dynamic of Wesleyanism (PDF). Kansas City, MO: Beacon Hill Press.
- Wynkoop, Mildred Bangs (1970). John Wesley: Christian Revolutionary. Kansas City, MO: Beacon Hill Press.
