= John Miley =

American theologian

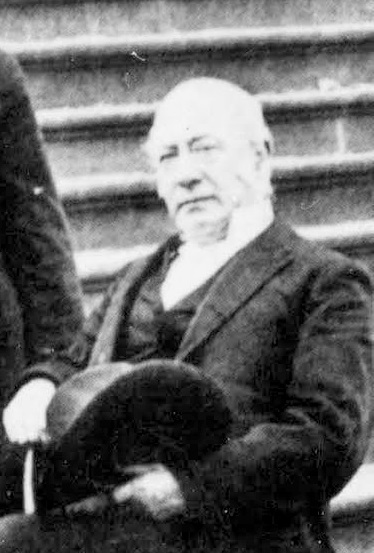
- Born: December 25, 1813
- Died: December 13, 1895
- Education: Augusta College
- Occupations: Theologian, university teacher, Minister, Catholic priest
- Employer: Drew University
- Notable work: Systematic Theology

John Miley (December 25, 1813 – December 13, 1895) was an American Methodist Episcopal minister and theologian, who was one of the major Methodist theological voices of the 19th century.

== Biography ==
=== Early life ===
Miley was born December 25, 1813 on a farm near Hamilton, Butler County, Ohio. Miley graduated from Augusta College where he received A.B. in 1834 and an A.M. in 1837. During his college life he was influenced by three professors Joseph Tomlinson, Joseph Trimble, and Henry Bascom.

=== Career ===
In 1838, Miley entered the church's ministry through the Ohio Conference. From 1838 to 1852, he served different churches in Ohio. In 1852 he transferred to the New York East Conference. In 1866 he transferred to the New York Conference. In 1859, the Ohio Wesleyan University conferred an honorary Doctor of Divinity degree on him.

From 1852 to 1873, he served churches in New York and Connecticut. As a Methodist pastor, he had held nineteen different pastoral appointments. In 1872, he joined a commission organized by the general conference to develop a code of ecclesiastical law for the Methodist Episcopal Church.

Beginning in 1873, he served as chair of systematic theology at Drew University in Madison, NJ, after his brother-in-law, Randolph Sinks Foster, left the seat to become a bishop. Miley was one of "the Great Five" revered professors who led Drew for decades, along with Henry Anson Buttz, George Crooks, James Strong, and Samuel F. Upham.

He was the author of Systematic Theology (1892), a two-volume work which served as a key text for Methodist seminarians for nearly thirty years. He also authored The Atonement in Christ (1879), in which he demonstrated what he believed were severe Biblical and theological problems with commonly held theories on the doctrine of the atonement of Christ such as the penal substitution and the moral example.

=== Theology ===
Miley was a systematic theologian in the Wesleyan tradition. He had Arminian soteriological views. He developed a strong governmental theory of atonement based theology heavily reliant on the work of Hugo Grotius. Thus, for him, the atonement of Christ is a satisfaction for sins by substitution, but not a satisfaction by penal substitution. The atonement of Christ is universal, but the forgiveness of sins is conditional to the faith. Moreover, the substitution of Christ is in suffering, not in penalty.

=== Death ===
Miley died December 13, 1895.

== Works ==
- Miley, John (1850). The History of the Papal States: From Their Origin to the Present Day. Vol. 1. London: T.C. Newby.
- Miley, John (1850). The History of the Papal States: From Their Origin to the Present Day. Vol. 2. London: T.C. Newby.
- Miley, John (1850). The History of the Papal States: From Their Origin to the Present Day. Vol. 3. London: T.C. Newby.
- Miley, John (1851). Treatise on class meetings. Cincinnati: Printed at the Methodist concern for the author.
- Miley, John (1866). Francis Asbury. New York: Harper & Brothers.
- Miley, John (1879). The Atonement in Christ. New York: Eaton & Mains.
- Miley, John (1892). Systematic theology. Vol. 1. New York: Eaton & Mains.
- Miley, John (1892). Systematic theology. Vol. 2. New York: Eaton & Mains.

== Notes and references ==
=== Sources ===
- Allen, David (2016). The Extent of the Atonement: A Historical and Critical Review. Nashville: B&H Academic.
- Lewis, Edwin (1942). "John Miley". The Teachers of Drew, 1867-942, A Commemorative Volume issued on the occasion of the 75th Anniversary of the Founding of Drew Theological Seminary, October 15, 1942. Madison, NJ: Drew University.
- Olson, Roger E. (2009). Arminian Theology: Myths and Realities. Downers Grove: InterVarsity Press.
- Olson, Roger E. (2010). "Arminian teaching regarding original sin". Roger E. Olson: My evangelical, Arminian theological musings. Patheos.
- Tooley, W. Andrew (2013). Reinventing Redemption: The Methodist Doctrine of Atonement in Britain and America in the Long Nineteenth Century (PDF) (Phd thesis). Stirling: University of Stirling.
- Yrigoyen, Charles (1999). "Miley, John (1813-1895), clergyman and theologian in the Methodist Episcopal church". American national biography. Oxford: Oxford University Press. doi:10.1093/anb/9780198606697.article.0801986.
- Yrigoyen, Charles (2013). "Miley, John". Historical Dictionary of Methodism. Lanham, MD: Scarecrow Press.
