= Northern Seminary =

American Christian seminary in Illinois

- Former name: Northern Baptist Theological Seminary
- Type: Private seminary
- Established: 1913
- Religious affiliation: American Baptist Churches USA
- Academic affiliations: Association of Theological Schools in the United States and Canada
- President: Ingrid Faro (interim)
- Faculty: 9 (2025)
- Postgraduates: 161 (2025)
- Location: Lisle, Illinois, United States; 41°48′33″N 88°03′22″W
- Campus: Online/hybrid
- Website: www.seminary.edu

Northern Seminary is a private Baptist seminary in Lisle, Illinois. Historically known as Northern Baptist Theological Seminary, it is affiliated with the American Baptist Churches USA.

== History ==
The Seminary was founded in 1913 by the Second Baptist Church of Chicago named as Northern Baptist Theological Seminary as a theologically conservative alternative within the framework of its association with the American Baptist Churches USA. In 1920 a collegiate department was founded, and the American Baptist Churches became a seminary partner. In 1963, it moved to Lombard, Illinois. In 2004, it was renamed Northern Seminary. In 2017, it moved to Lisle, Illinois.

It is accredited by the Association of Theological Schools in the United States and Canada.

On March 13, 2023, the president, William D. Shiell, resigned from his position amid controversy. After several interim presidents, Joy J. Moore officially became the president of Northern Seminary on December 1, 2024. On January 2, 2026, Moore and the Board of Trustees mutually agreed that she would resign from the position of president of the seminary. Ingrid Faro was named interim president.

=== Presidents ===
No.	Name	Term	Ref
1	John Marvin Dean	1913–1918	
2	George W. Taft	1918–1936	
3	William Law Ferguson	1936–1938	
4	Charles W. Koller	1938–1961	
5	Benjamin P. Browne (Note: Browne served as interim president during Koller's sabbatical during his last year.)	1960–1964	
6	Bryan F. Archibald	1965–1975	
7	William R. Myers Sr.	1975–1988	
8	Ian M. Chapman	1988–2001	
9	Charles W. Moore	2001–2006	
–	John F. Kirn (Note: Served as interim president)	2006–2008	
10	Alistair Brown	2008–2016	
11	William D. Shiell	2016–2023	
–	John C. Bowling	2023	
–	Karen Walker Freeburg	2023–2024	
12	Joy J. Moore	2024–2026	
–	Ingrid Faro	2026–present	

== Notable people ==
=== Alumni ===
- David Breese, evangelist, author, and radio broadcaster
- Millard Erickson, 20th-century theologian and author
- Clay Evans (pastor), 20th-century African-American evangelical pastor
- Derwin Gray, professional football player and pastor
- Carl Henry, founder and first editor of Christianity Today
- Torrey Johnson, first president of Youth for Christ
- Stephen R. Lawhead, fiction writer
- Tara Beth Leach, pastor and author
- John Osteen, first pastor of Lakewood Church in Houston, Texas
- Kenneth N. Taylor, creator of The Living Bible paraphrase and founder of Tyndale House publishers
- Warren W. Wiersbe, author, teacher, and minister for Moody Church and Back to the Bible
- Gideon B. Williamson, general superintendent in the Church of the Nazarene
- Mildred Bangs Wynkoop, Wesleyan-Holiness preacher, evangelist, and theologian

=== Faculty ===
- Lynn H. Cohick, former provost, dean of academic affairs and professor of New Testament
- Harold Lindsell, former professor
- Nijay Gupta, Professor of New Testament
- Greg Boyd (theologian), Adjunct Professor
- Scot McKnight, former Julius R. Mantey chair of New Testament
- Joy J. Moore, former president of Northern Seminary
- Robert E. Webber, former Myers Professor of Ministry
