= Samuel Upham =

Samuel Upham may refer to:

- Samuel C. Upham (1819–1885), American journalist, lyricist, navy officer and counterfeiter
- Samuel F. Upham (1834–1904), professor of theology
