= Richard G. Colling =

Richard G. Colling is a former professor of biology and chairman of the biological sciences department at Olivet Nazarene University in Bourbonnais, Illinois, who was barred from teaching general biology after writing a book that attempts to reconcile Christian belief with a scientific understanding of evolution.

== Education and career ==
Colling attended Olivet Nazarene University as an undergraduate, graduating in 1976. He earned a Ph.D. in microbiology from the University of Kansas in 1980, did postdoctoral research in molecular oncology at Baylor College of Medicine, and joined the faculty of Olivet Nazarene in 1981. He was granted tenure at the institution in 1988. In 2000 he was Olivet Nazarene's "faculty member of the year."

In 2004, Colling published the book Random Designer: Created From Chaos, To Connect With the Creator.

Colling left the Olivet Nazarene faculty in 2009.

== Evolution at Olivet Nazarene ==
In September 2007, Olivet President John C. Bowling decided after consultation with denominational leaders to prohibit Colling from teaching the general biology class he had taught since 1991. Bowling also banned professors from assigning a book Colling wrote attempting to reconcile the foundations of modern evolutionary biology with the principles of modern Christian faith. According to an interview with Newsweek, the reason behind Bowling's response was to "get the bull's-eye off Colling and let the storm die down." Newsweek noted, however, contributions by Nazarene professors like Karl Giberson, author of Saving Darwin: How to be a Christian and believe in evolution and other books on the topic, who have received more acclaim than punishment for their scholarship. The Manual of the Church of the Nazarene states: “903.8. Creation: The Church of the Nazarene believes in the biblical account of creation (‘In the beginning God created the heavens and the earth...’ — Genesis 1:1). We oppose any godless interpretation of the origin of the universe and of humankind. However, the church accepts as valid all scientifically verifiable discoveries in geology and other natural phenomena, for we firmly believe that God is the Creator." The American Association of University Professors later investigated and filed a report finding that Colling's rights as a professor were violated when Bowling placed the concerns of the denomination which ran the school above so-called principles of academic freedom.

In 2009, Colling resigned from the Olivet Nazarene University faculty in an agreement with the school.

== See also ==
- Theistic evolution
- Creation–evolution controversy
