= J. Kenneth Grider =

Nazarene Christian theologian

J. Kenneth Grider (October 22, 1921 – December 6, 2006) was a Nazarene Christian theologian and former seminary professor primarily associated with the followers of John Wesley who are part of the Holiness movement.

== Biography ==
=== Early life ===
J. Kenneth Grider was born October 22, 1921, in Madison, IL to William Sanford and Elizabeth (Krone) Grider. In 1948, he got a M.A. from the Drew University, Madison, New Jersey in 1950. In 1947, he graduated from the Nazarene Theological Seminary. He received his PhD from the University of Glasgow in 1952.

=== Career ===
Grider was a distinguished visiting professor of theology at Olivet Nazarene University in Bourbonnais, IL, and professor of theology emeritus at Nazarene Theological Seminary, Kansas City. He taught courses in Hurlet Nazarene College (Scotland), Point Loma Nazarene University, Olivet Nazarene University, Southern Nazarene University, Asia-Pacific Nazarene Theological Seminary, and extension courses in Mexico and the Philippines.

He was an ordained elder in the Church of the Nazarene.

He was one of the translators of the New International Version of the Bible, working at two committee levels on six New Testament books. His "magnum opus" is the systematic theology A Wesleyan-Holiness Theology (1994). He also wrote over 2,000 poems, articles, commentaries, essays, and lessons and contributed to numerous symposia. He was the editor of The Seminary Tower for 36 years.

=== Theology ===
Grider had Arminian soteriological views in the Wesleyan tradition, and was a supporter of the governmental theory of atonement view.

=== Death ===
Grider died December 6, 2006, in Chandler, AZ.

=== Awards ===
In 1966, Grider received the Olivet Nazarene University's Clergy Alumnus of the Year award. In 1991, he received an honorary Doctor of Divinity degree from the Olivet Nazarene University. In 1999, he received the Lifetime Achievement Award of the Wesleyan Theological Society.

== Publications ==
=== Books ===
- Grider, J. Kenneth (1950). Representative theories of natural evil (M.A. thesis). Madison, NJ: Drew University.
- Grider, J. Kenneth (1952). The problem of natural evil in the light of the Christian doctrine of the incarnation (Ph. D. thesis). Glasgow: Glasgow University.
- Grider, J. Kenneth (1964). Taller my soul : or, The means of Christian growth. Kansas City, MO: Beacon Hill Press of Kansas City.
- Grider, J. Kenneth (1965). The word and the doctrine : studies in contemporary Wesleyan-Arminian theology. Kansas City, MO: Beacon Hill Press of Kansas City.
- Grider, J. Kenneth (1965). Repentance unto life : what it means to repent. Kansas City, MO: Beacon Hill Press of Kansas City.
- Grider, J. Kenneth (1980). Entire sanctification : the distinctive doctrine of Wesleyanism. Kansas City, MO: Beacon Hill Press of Kansas City.
- Grider, J. Kenneth (1982). Born again and growing. Kansas City, MO: Beacon Hill Press of Kansas City.
- Grider, J. Kenneth (1983). Gibralters of the faith. Kansas City, MO: Beacon Hill Press of Kansas City.
- Taylor, Richard Shelley; Grider, J. Kenneth; Taylor, Willard H. (1983). Beacon Dictionary of Theology. Kansas City, MO: Beacon Hill Press of Kansas City. Archived from the original on 2022-01-20.
- Grider, J. Kenneth (1994). A Wesleyan Holiness Theology. Kansas City, MO: Beacon Hill Press of Kansas City.

=== Chapters ===
- Grider, J. Kenneth (1966). "Ezekiel". Beacon Bible commentary. Volume IV, Isaiah through Daniel. Kansas City, MO: Beacon Hill Press of Kansas City.
- Grider, J. Kenneth (1983). "The holy trinity : the triune God". A Contemporary Wesleyan theology : biblical, systematic, and practical. Grand Rapids, MI: Zondervan Pub. House.
- Grider, J. Kenneth (2019). "The holy trinity : the triune God". Basics Of The Faith. Grand Rapids, MI: Zondervan Pub. House.

=== Articles ===
- Grider, J. Kenneth (1951). "The Church of the Nazarene". Theology. 54 (8): 304–305. doi:10.1177/0040571X5105437407. S2CID 171439344.
- Grider, J. Kenneth (1958). "Masturbation". Pastoral Psychology. 9 (4): 5. doi:10.1007/BF01741061.
- Grider, J. Kenneth (1982). "The Nature of Wesleyan Theology" (PDF). Wesleyan Theological Journal. 17 (2): 43–57. Archived from the original (PDF) on 2022-11-05.
- Grider, J. Kenneth (2000). "Wesleyans and Homosexuality" (PDF).

== Notes and references ==
=== Sources ===
- Bassett, Paul M. (1999). "Tribute to J. Kenneth Grider" (PDF). Wesleyan Theological Journal. 34 (2): 281–286. Archived from the original (PDF) on 2009-11-28.
- BR (2005). "The NIV Committee on Bible Translation". Bible Research.
- Cook, Robert Cecil (1968). "J. Kenneth Grider". Who's who in American Education. Hattiesburg, MS: Who's Who in American Education.
- KCS (2006). "Joseph Kenneth Grider". Kansas City Star.
- Olson, Roger E. (2010). "Arminian teaching regarding original sin". Roger E. Olson: My evangelical, Arminian theological musings. Patheos.
- Olson, Roger E. (2017). "A Neglected Theory of the Atonement? (The "Governmental Theory")". Roger E. Olson: My evangelical, Arminian theological musings. Patheos.
