= Jon Paul Scott =

Jon Paul Scott is an American Christian minister and academic administrator. He is principal of Nazarene Theological College of Central Africa in Lilongwe, Malawi, affiliated with the Church of the Nazarene. In 1969, he graduated from Olivet Nazarene University with a BS in Business Administration.
