= Tara Beth Leach =

American evangelical pastor and author

Tara Beth Leach (born 1982) is an American evangelical pastor and author.

== Education ==
Leach was born in 1982. She has said she first felt called to ministry while in high school but was told she couldn't be a pastor as a woman. She has a BA in youth ministry from Olivet Nazarene University and an MDiv from Northern Seminary, where she also worked as a teaching assistant for Scot McKnight.

== Career ==
Leach was appointed Senior Pastor at First Church of the Nazarene of Pasadena ("PazNaz") in 2016, the first woman in the role. In 2017, she was the youngest female megachurch pastor in the United States. Since 2023, Tara Beth has served as the Senior Pastor of Good Shepherd Church in Naperville, Illinois.

Leach's first book, Emboldened, released in 2017, seeks to encourage women into Christian ministry. Her 2021 book Radiant suggests church leaders need to look at themselves rather than culture to explain the trend away from church attendance.

== Personal life ==
Leach married in 2006 and has two sons.

== Publications ==
- Leach, Tara Beth (2016). "A Symphonic Melody:Wesleyan-Holiness Theology Meets New-Perspective Paul". In Scot McKnight; Joseph B. Modica (eds.). The Apostle Paul and the Christian Life: Ethical and Missional Implications of the New Perspective. Baker Academic. pp. 153–178. ISBN 9781493403516.
- Leach, Tara Beth (2017). Emboldened: A Vision for Empowering Women in Ministry. InterVarsity Press. ISBN 9780830887583.
- Leach, Tara Beth (2017). Kingdom Culture: The Sermon on the Mount: Workbook. Foundry Publishing. ISBN 9780834136168.
- Boone, Dan; Chambo, Samantha; Leach, Tara Beth; Rowell, Jeren (2018). For God So Loved: A Lenten Devotional. Foundry Publishing. ISBN 9780834137073.
- Leach, Tara Beth (2021). Forty Days on Being a Six. InterVarsity Press. ISBN 9780830847525.
- Leach, Tara Beth (2021). Radiant Church: Restoring the Credibility of Our Witness. InterVarsity Press. ISBN 9780830847631.
