= Henry Orton Wiley =

Theologian from the United States of America

Henry Orton Wiley (11 November 1877 – 22 August 1961) was a Christian theologian primarily associated with the followers of John Wesley who are part of the Holiness movement. A member of the Church of the Nazarene, his "magnum opus" was the three volume systematic theology Christian Theology.

== Early life and education ==
Henry Orton Wiley was born in Marquette, Nebraska on 11 November 1877. The Wiley family moved to California in April 1886, then to Oregon in 1893. H. Orton Wiley graduated from Medford High School in Oregon on May 31, 1895. In his last year of high school, Wiley was employed at a local drugstore and began the study of Pharmacy and was awarded his certificate of Pharmacy by the Oregon State Board of Pharmaceutics on March 9, 1897. He later received a diploma in Pharmacy in 1897 from the National Institute of Pharmacy in Chicago, Illinois. Wiley converted to Christianity in 1895. Wiley met his wife, Alice, while working at his father's store. They were married in 1902. Wiley decided to further his education and earned his Bachelor of Arts degree from the University of the Pacific in 1910 and also a Bachelor of Divinity from Pacific Theological Seminary the same year.

== Career in education ==
In 1910, Wiley was elected dean of the Pacific Bible College under President Phineas F. Bresee. Wiley was asked by President Phineas F. Bresee to write the first catalogue for the college. In it, Wiley defended the role of the Christian liberal arts college, emphasizing its roles as a cultural custodian and promoter of spiritual intensity.

Later, Wiley would himself become president of Nazarene University in 1913, but leave in 1916 to become president of the Idaho-Oregon Holiness School, which would be renamed Northwest Nazarene College under Wiley's leadership. He would leave Idaho to become president in California again in 1927 until leaving again in 1928, and was president at Pasadena one more time from 1933 to 1949.

Upon arriving at the Idaho-Oregon Holiness School, Wiley was offered a notable ten-year contract as president, during which he published the first Oasis yearbook and Nazarene Messenger, wrote a standard three-volume theological statement of the Church of the Nazarene. He “guided the school between Scylla of emotionalism and the Charybdis of formalism.” His leadership pushed the upstart institution to become a liberal arts school, a dream represented through changing the school’s name to Northwest Nazarene College.

== Theology ==
In his book Introduction to christian theology, Wiley argues for the Arminian views of unlimited atonement, conditional election and prevenient grace in opposition to the main points of Calvinism. In Christian theology, he stresses that the prevenient grace, operates in a continuous way from "the first dawn of the moral life". This would allow a synergistic co-operation with the human will, that doesn't undermine the responsibility and the total depravity of man. Wayne Grudem considers this work to be the best Arminian systematic theology from the twentieth century, but not reaching to the level of John Miley’s. Wiley held to the governmental theory of atonement.

== Memorial/legacy ==
Orton died of cancer in his residence in Pasadena on 22 August 1961. The H. Orton Wiley House is listed on the National Register of Historic Places in part for its association with Wiley.

== Publications ==
- Wiley, H. Orton (1913). "Educational Ideal of the Point Loma Nazarene University". Point Loma Nazarene University. Pasadena, CA.
- Wiley, H. Orton (1917). The Logos doctrine of the Prologue of the Fourth Gospel. Berkeley, CA: M.S.T. Pacific School of Religion.
- Wiley, H. Orton (1919). Manual of the history, doctrine, government and ritual of the Church of the Nazarene. Kansas City, MO: Nazarene Pub. House.
- Ellyson, E. P.; Wiley, H. Orton (1930). A study of the pupil. Kansas City, MO: Dept. of Church Schools, Church of the Nazarine.
- Ellyson, E. P.; Wiley, H. Orton (1931). The principles of teaching. Kansas City, MO: Dept. of Church Schools, Church of the Nazarine.
- Wiley, H. Orton (1940). Christian theology. Vol. 1. Kansas City, MO: Beacon Hill Press.
- Wiley, H. Orton (1941). Christian theology. Vol. 2. Kansas City, MO: Beacon Hill Press.
- Wiley, H. Orton (1943). Christian theology. Vol. 3. Kansas City, MO: Beacon Hill Press.
- Wiley, H. Orton; Culbertson, Paul T. (1945). Introduction to christian theology. Kansas City, MO: Beacon Hill Press.
- Slote, J. Warren; Wiley, H. Orton (1946). Questions on Christian theology. Kansas City, MO: Beacon Hill Press.
- Wiley, H. Orton (1951). "Christian education". Pasadena College. Pasadena, CA.
- Carson, Esther Carson; Wiley, H. Orton (1951). Letters of Esther Carson Winans. Kansas City, MO: Beacon Hill Press.
- Wiley, H. Orton (1951). The Psychology of holiness. Lectures at Western School of Evangelical Religion. Portland, OR: Western School of Evangelical Religion".
- Wiley, H. Orton (1953). The doctrine of God in contemporary philosophical theology. Pasadena, CA: Pasadena College. Division of Graduate Studies in Religion.
- Wiley, H. Orton (c. 1955). Reflections ... Hollywood, CA: Neophon.
- Wiley, H. Orton (1956). God has the answer. Kansas City, MO: Beacon Hill Press.
- Wiley, H. Orton (1959). A Study of the philosophy of John Wright Buckham in its application to the problems of modern theology. Kansas City, MO: Nazarene Theological Seminary.
- Wiley, H. Orton (1959). The Epistle to the Hebrews. Kansas City, MO: Beacon Hill Press.
- Wiley, H. Orton (1971). The harps of God and other sermons. Kansas City, MO: Beacon Hill Press.
- Wiley, H. Orton; Price, Ross E. (1980). God's covenant with a holy people : college senior week addresses from the prophecy of Isaiah. OCLC 8211802.
- Wiley, H. Orton (1963). The pentecostal promise; and "We all do fade as a leaf" : anniversary message given on outstanding occasions. Kansas City, MO: Beacon Hill Press.
- Wiley, H. Orton (1984). "The Emancipations of Peace". Herald of Holiness. 73 (5). Kansas City, MO: Publishing House of the Pentecostal Church of the Nazarene: 8–9.
- Wiley, H. Orton; Price, Ross E. (2004). The Epistle to the Ephesians : a commentary. Salem, OH: Allegheny Publications.

== Notes and references ==
=== Sources ===
- Grudem, Wayne (1994). Systematic Theology: An Introduction to Biblical Doctrine. Leicester, England & Grand Rapids, MI: Inter-Varsity Press & Zondervan.
- Ingersol, Stan (1986). "Why These Schools? Historical Perspectives on Nazarene Higher Education" (PDF). Nazarene Archives. Archived from the original (PDF) on 2008-06-24.
- Price, J. Matthew (2006). We Teach Holiness: The Life and Work of H. Orton Wiley (1877-1961) (PDF). Holiness Data Ministry. Archived from the original (PDF) on 2011-06-07.
- Riley, John (1988). From sagebrush to Ivy: The Story of Northwest Nazarene College... 1913-1988. Nampa, ID: Pacific Press.
- Shultz, Gary L. (2014). A Multi-Intentioned View of the Extent of the Atonement. Eugene, OR: Wipf and Stock Publishers.
