= Joy J. Moore =

American homilist

Joy Jittaun Moore is a biblical scholar and academic. She most recently was a professor of homiletics at Northern Seminary where she served as its president from December 2024 to January 2026. In early January 2026, Moore and the Board of Trustees mutually agreed that she would resign from the position of president of the seminary. Prior to coming to Northern Seminary, she was a professor of biblical preaching at Luther Seminary in St. Paul, Minnesota.

== Biography ==
A native of Chicago, Moore grew up in South Side, Chicago. Her passion for teaching led her to earn a B.A. in education and mathematics at the National College of Education at National Louis University in 1982. She attended Commonwealth Community Church in Chicago and experienced a call to ministry there. She received an M.Div. at Garrett–Evangelical Theological Seminary in 1989. Having received a John Wesley Fellowship (2001–2005), she completed a Ph.D. in Practical Theology at Brunel University/London School of Theology in 2007.

Moore was the director of student life at Asbury Theological Seminary from 1999 to 2001. She was chaplain and director of church relations at Adrian College and has taught at Duke Divinity School. She was assistant professor of preaching between 2012 and 2017 at Fuller Theological Seminary in Pasadena, California, and she established its William E. Pannell Center for African American Church Studies in 2015. She was associate professor of practical theology at Wesley Seminary at Indiana Wesleyan University between 2017 and 2018. Prior to joining Luther Seminary, she also pastored a historic African American United Methodist congregation in Flint, Michigan. She joined Luther Seminary as professor of biblical preaching in 2019.

Moore served as president of the Wesleyan Theological Society from 2021 to 2022. She also served as a professor of biblical preaching at Luther Seminary in St. Paul, Minnesota. She most recently served as president and professor of homiletics at Northern Seminary from December 2024 to January 2026. In early January 2026, Moore and the Board of Trustees mutually agreed that she would resign from the position of president of the seminary.

Moore is an ordained elder of the United Methodist Church.
