= H. Orton Wiley House =

Historic house in Idaho, United States

- U.S. National Register of Historic Places
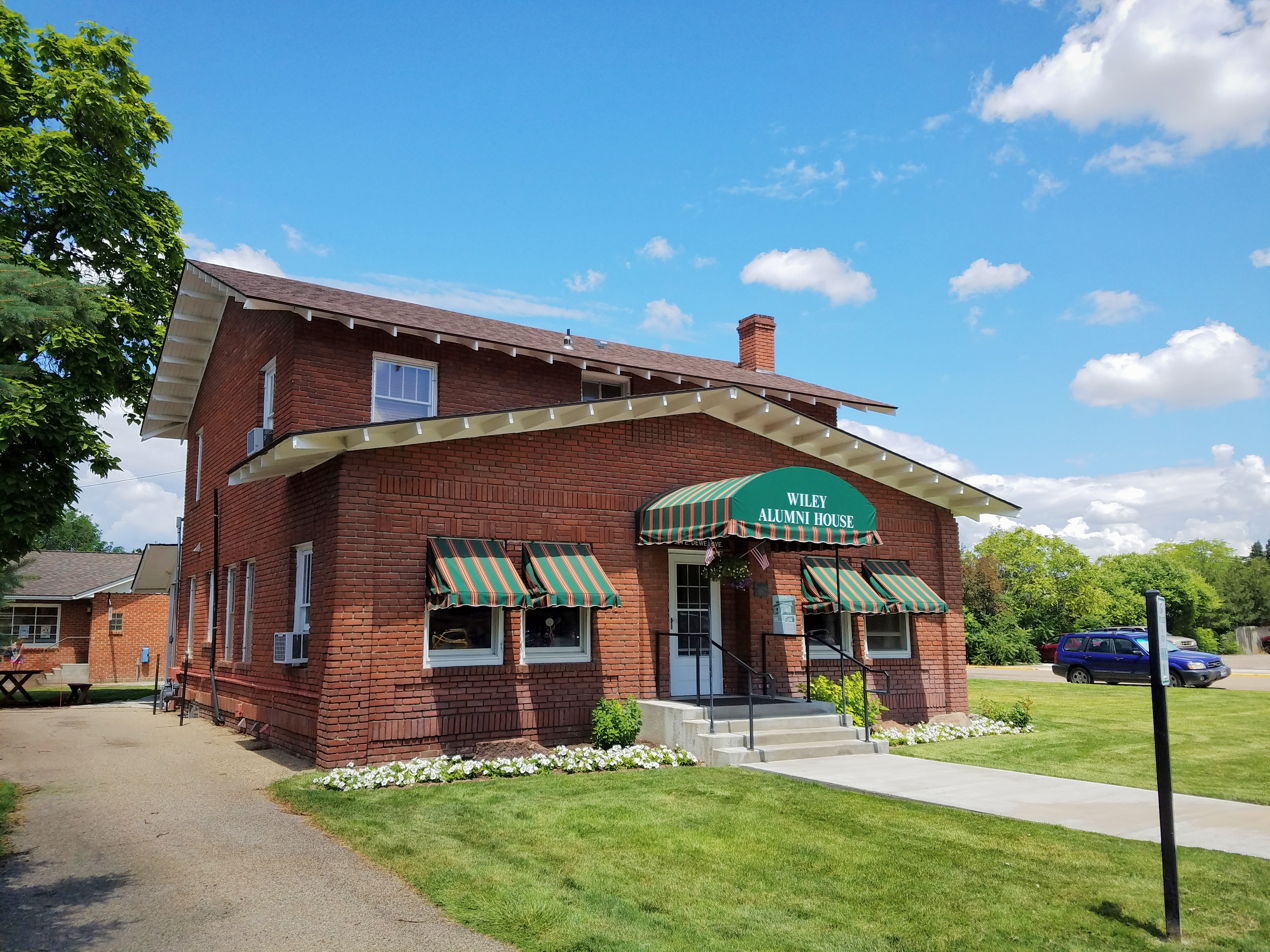

- Location within Idaho Location within the United States
- Location: 524 E. Dewey, Nampa, Idaho
- Coordinates: 43°33′49″N 116°33′58″W
- Area: less than one acre
- Built: 1922-23
- Built by: Beard, E.S.
- NRHP reference No.: 86002163
- Added to NRHP: September 11, 1986

The H. Orton Wiley House, located at 524 E. Dewey in Nampa, Idaho, was built in 1922. It was listed on the National Register of Historic Places in 1986. It has also been known as Wiley Alumni House.

It is a two-story brick house on the edge of the campus of Northwest Nazarene University.

It is significant for its "association with the organization and early development of Northwest Nazarene College and with the college's first president, H. Orton Wiley. Built in 1922-23, the house is the only building that survives to represent the early era in Northwest Nazarene College history."
