= Salvation in Christianity =

Saving of people from sin in Christianity

In Christianity, salvation (also called deliverance or redemption) refers to a state that a human being can attain through the grace of God by accepting Jesus Christ and having faith. Although Christian denominations disagree on exactly how a person achieves salvation, most agree on the importance of following the teachings of Jesus in the Gospels, believing that Jesus died and miraculously rose again, and recognizing that Jesus is the Son of God or God the Son. A person who has achieved salvation is considered to have been saved from sin and its consequences, (Note: Definition of salvation in Christianity: Oxford English Dictionary, 2nd ed. 1989: "The saving of the soul; the deliverance from sin and its consequences") including death and separation from God, and, though still sinful, is regarded by God as righteous and receives the promise of eternal life. Some denominations believe that salvation can be attained by faith alone (sola fide).

The idea of Jesus's death as an atonement for human sin was recorded in the Christian Bible, and was elaborated on in the Gospels and the epistles attributed to Paul the Apostle. Paul saw the faithful redeemed by participation in Jesus's death and rising. Early Christians regarded themselves as partaking in a new covenant with God, open to both Jews and Gentiles, through the sacrificial death and subsequent exaltation of Jesus Christ.

Early Christian beliefs of the person and sacrificial role of Jesus in human salvation were further elaborated by the Church Fathers, medieval writers and modern scholars in various atonement theories, such as the ransom theory, Christus Victor theory, recapitulation theory, satisfaction theory, penal substitution theory, and moral influence theory.

Variant views on salvation (soteriology) are among the main fault lines dividing the various Christian denominations, including conflicting definitions of sin and depravity (the sinful nature of humankind), justification (God's means of removing the consequences of sin), and atonement (the forgiving or pardoning of sin through the suffering, death and resurrection of Jesus).

== Definition and scope ==
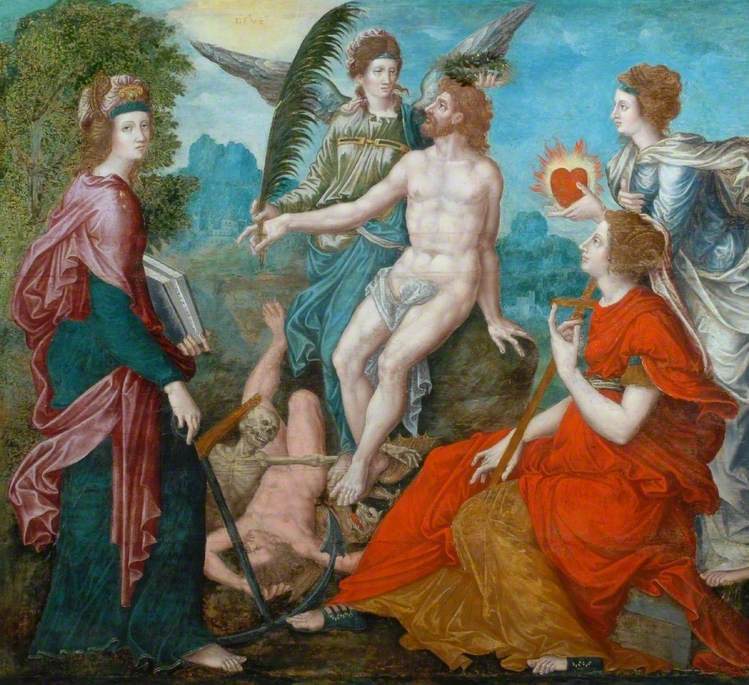
Attributed to the circle of Pieter Claeissins II, A Christian Allegory of the Salvation of a Christian Soul (c. 1570–1600) depicts the triumph of virtue over death and Satan. The Bowes Museum.

Salvation in Christianity, or deliverance or redemption, is the "saving [of] human beings from death and separation from God" by Christ's death and resurrection. (Note: "Traditional Christianity maintains that human beings are subject to death and eternal separation from God as a result of their sinfulness, but that they can be saved from this condition somehow as a result of what we might refer to as "the work of Jesus", which work includes at least his suffering and death on the cross, and perhaps also his sinless life, resurrection, and ascension. We have used the term 'theories of the atonement' here because that is the term most commonly used in the philosophical literature on this topic, and it is a term often enough used in theology as well. But it is not a neutral term. Rather, it already embodies a partial theory about what human salvation involves and about what the work of Christ accomplishes. In particular, it presupposes that saving human beings from death and separation from God primarily involves atoning for sin rather than (say) delivering human beings from some kind of bondage, repairing human nature, or something else. In the New Testament we find various terms and phrases (in addition to 'salvation') used to characterize or describe what the work of Jesus accomplished on behalf of humanity—e.g., justification, redemption or ransom, reconciliation, deliverance from sin, re-creation or rebirth, the offering of an atoning sacrifice, abundant life, and eternal life. Obviously these terms are not all synonymous; so part of the task of an overall theology of salvation—a soteriology—is to sort out the relations among these various terms and phrases (is salvation simply to be identified with eternal life, for example?), to determine which are to be taken literally and which are mere metaphors, and to explain which effects have been brought about by Jesus's life, which by his death, which by his resurrection, and so on. In light of all this, some theologians and philosophers deliberately avoid talking about 'theories of the atonement' and talk instead about (e.g.) 'the theology of reconciliation' or theories about 'the redemption', etc."Murray & Rea 2012) (Note: "At the heart of Christian faith is the reality and hope of salvation in Jesus Christ. Christian faith is faith in the God of salvation revealed in Jesus of Nazareth. The Christian tradition has always equated this salvation with the transcendent, eschatological fulfillment of human existence in a life freed from sin, finitude, and mortality and united with the triune God. This is perhaps the non-negotiable item of Christian faith. What has been a matter of debate is the relation between salvation and our activities in the world."Min 1989, p. 79)

Christian salvation not only concerns the atonement itself, but also the question of how one partakes of this salvation, by faith, baptism, or obedience; and the question of whether this salvation is individual or universal. It further involves questions regarding the afterlife, e.g. "heaven, hell, purgatory, soul sleep, and annihilation". The fault lines between the various denominations include conflicting definitions of sin, justification, and atonement.

== Biblical account ==
Old Testament's references to Redemption may be found in Psalms 130:8 and Ezra 3:1–13.

== Sin ==
John the Apostle defined sin as "lawlessness." In the West (differentiating from Eastern Orthodoxy) Christian hamartiology describes sin as an act of offence against God by despising his persons and Christian biblical law, and by injuring others. It is an evil human act, which violates the rational nature of man, as well as God's nature and his eternal law. According to the classical definition of Augustine of Hippo, sin is "a word, deed, or desire in opposition to the eternal law of God".

Christian tradition has explained sin as a fundamental aspect of human existence, brought about by original sin—also called ancestral sin, (Note: Examples: Golitzin 1995, p. 119; Tate 2005, p. 190; Bartolo-Abela 2011, p. 32; Hassan 2012, p. 62) the fall of man stemming from Adam's rebellion in Eden by eating the forbidden fruit from the tree of knowledge of good and evil. Paul espouses it in Romans 5:12–19, and Augustine of Hippo popularized his interpretation of it in the West, developing it into a notion of "hereditary sin," arguing that God holds all the descendants of Adam and Eve accountable for Adam's sin of rebellion, and as such all people deserve God's wrath and condemnation—apart from any actual sins they personally commit.

Total depravity (also called "radical corruption" or "pervasive depravity") is a Protestant theological doctrine derived from the concept of original sin. It is the teaching that, as a consequence of the fall of man, every person born into the world is enslaved to the service of sin as a result of their inherent fallen nature and, apart from the irresistible or prevenient grace of God, is utterly unable to choose to follow God, refrain from evil, or accept the gift of salvation as it is offered. It is advocated to various degrees by many Protestant confessions of faith and catechisms, including those of some Lutheran synods, and Calvinism, teaching irresistible grace. Arminians, such as Methodists, also believe and teach total depravity, but with the distinct difference of teaching prevenient grace.

== Justification ==
In Christian theology, justification is God's act of removing the guilt and penalty of sin while at the same time making a sinner righteous through Christ's atoning sacrifice. The means of justification is an area of significant difference among Catholicism, Orthodoxy, and Protestantism. (Note: Breck: "In the West, at least in the popular mind, the debate was long polarized between Catholic emphasis on salvation through "works-righteousness," and Protestant insistence on "justification by faith (alone!)." Protestantism believes salvation is accomplished by grace in response to faith. But that faith cannot be passive; it must express itself, not merely by confessing Jesus as "personal Lord and Savior," but by feeding, clothing, visiting and otherwise caring for the "least" of Jesus's brethren (Mt 25).) Justification is often seen as being the theological fault line that divided the Catholic from the Lutheran, Anglican and Reformed traditions of Protestantism during the Reformation.

Broadly speaking, the Catholic Church, the Eastern Orthodox Church, the Oriental Orthodox Churches, and the Church of the East distinguish between initial justification, which in their view ordinarily occurs at baptism; and final salvation, accomplished after a lifetime of striving to do God's will (theosis or divinization).

Theosis is a transformative process whose aim is likeness to or union with God, as taught by the Eastern Churches (Eastern Orthodox, Eastern Catholic, and Oriental Orthodox). As a process of transformation, theosis is brought about by the effects of catharsis (purification of mind and body) and theoria ('illumination' with the 'vision' of God). According to Eastern Christian teaching, theosis is very much the purpose of human life. It is considered achievable only through a synergy (or cooperation) between human activity and God's uncreated energies (or operations). The synonymous term divinization is the transforming effect of divine grace, the Spirit of God, or the atonement of Christ. Theosis and divinization are distinguished from sanctification, "being made holy," which can also apply to objects; and from apotheosis, also "divinization," lit. 'making divine').

Catholics believe faith which is active in charity and good works (fides caritate formata) can justify, or remove the burden of guilt in sin, from man. Forgiveness of sin exists and is natural, but justification can be lost by mortal sin.

In the Protestant doctrine, sin is merely "covered" and righteousness imputed. In Lutheranism, Anglicanism and Reformed Christianity, righteousness from God is viewed as being credited to the sinner's account through faith alone, without works. Protestants believe faith without works can justify man because Christ died for sinners, but anyone who truly has faith will produce good works as a product of faith, as a good tree produces good fruit. For Lutherans, justification can be lost with the loss of faith or mortal sin.

== Atonement ==
The word "atonement" often is used in the Old Testament to translate the Hebrew words kippur (Note: כיפור \ כִּפּוּר, kipúr (male, singular)) and kippurim, (Note: כיפורים \ כִּפּוּרִים, kipurím (male, plural)) which mean "propitiation" or "expiation"; the English word atonement is derived from the original meaning of "at-one-ment" (i.e., being "at one" or in harmony, with someone). According to Collins English Dictionary, atonement is used to describe the saving work that God granted (through Christ) to reconcile the world to himself, and also of the state of a person having been reconciled to God. According to The Oxford Dictionary of the Christian Church, atonement in Christian theology is "man's reconciliation with God through the sacrificial death of Christ."

Many Christians believe in unlimited atonement; however, some Christians teach limited atonement to those who are predestined unto salvation, as its primary benefits are not given to all of humankind but rather to believers only.

=== Theories of atonement ===
A number of metaphors (and Old Testament terms) and references have been used in New Testament writings to understand the person (Note: The earliest Christian writings give several titles to Jesus, such as Son of Man, Son of God, Messiah, and Kyrios, which were all derived from the Hebrew scriptures.) and death of Jesus. Starting in the 2nd century AD, various understandings of atonement have been put forth to explain the death and resurrection of Jesus, as well as the metaphors applied by the New Testament to understand his death. Over the centuries, Christians have held different ideas regarding how Jesus saves people, with different views still existing within various Christian denominations. According to the biblical scholar C. Marvin Pate, "...there are three aspects to Christ's atonement according to the early Church: vicarious atonement [substitutionary atonement], (Note: In Christianity, vicarious atonement, also called substitutionary atonement, is the idea that Jesus died "for us.") the eschatological defeat of Satan [Christ the Victor], and the imitation of Christ [participation in Jesus's death and resurrection]." Pate further notes that these three aspects were intertwined in the earliest Christian writings but that this intertwining was lost since the Patristic times. Because of the influence of Gustaf Aulén's 1931 Christus Victor study, the various theories or paradigms of atonement which developed after the New Testament writings are often grouped under the "classic paradigm," the "objective paradigm," and the "subjective paradigm". (Note: Karl Barth notes a range of alternative themes: forensic (humanity is guilty of a crime, and Christ takes the punishment), financial (humanity is indebted to God, and Christ pays humanity's debt) and cultic (Christ makes a sacrifice on humanity's behalf). For various cultural reasons, the oldest themes (honor and sacrifice) prove to have more depth than the more modern ones (payment of a debt, punishment for a crime). But in all these alternatives, the understanding of atonement has the same structure, in that humanoty owes something to God that cannot paid by human means, and that Christ pays it on humanity's behalf. Thus God remains both perfectly just (insisting on a penalty) and perfectly loving (paying the penalty himself). A great many Christians would define such a substitutionary view of the atonement as simply part of what orthodox Christians believe.)

=== Old Testament ===
In the Hebrew writings, God is absolutely righteous, and only pure and sinless persons can approach him. Reconciliation is achieved by an act of God, namely by his appointment of the sacrificial system, (Note: According to the Jewish Encyclopedia (1906), "The Mishnah says that sins are expiated (1) by sacrifice, (2) by repentance at death or on Yom Kippur, (3) in the case of the lighter transgressions of the positive or negative precepts, by repentance at any time [...] The graver sins, according to Rabbi, are apostasy, heretical interpretation of the Torah, and non-circumcision (Yoma 86a). The atonement for sins between a man and his neighbor is an ample apology (Yoma 85b)." (Note: Jewish Encyclopedia, SIN) The Jewish Virtual Library writes: "Another important concept [of sacrifices] is the element of substitution. The idea is that the thing being offered is a substitute for the person making the offering, and the things that are done to the offering are things that should have been done to the person offering. The offering is in some sense "punished" in place of the offerer. It is interesting to note that whenever the subject of Karbanot is addressed in the Torah, the name of G-d used is the four-letter name indicating G-d's mercy." (Note: Jeewish Virtual Library, Jewish Practices & Rituals: Sacrifices and Offerings (Karbanot)) The Jewish Encyclopedia further writes: "Most efficacious seemed to be the atoning power of suffering experienced by the righteous during the Exile. This is the idea underlying the description of the suffering servant of God in Isa. liii. 4, 12, Hebr. [...] of greater atoning power than all the Temple sacrifices was the suffering of the elect ones who were to be servants and witnesses of the Lord (Isa. xlii. 1–4, xlix. 1–7, l. 6). This idea of the atoning power of the suffering and death of the righteous finds expression also in IV Macc. vi. 27, xvii. 21–23; M. Ḳ. 28a; Pesiḳ. xxvii. 174b; Lev. R. xx.; and formed the basis of Paul's doctrine of the atoning blood of Christ (Rom. iii. 25)." (Note: Jewish Encyclopedia (1906), ATONEMENT)) or, in the prophetic view, "by the future Divine gift of a new covenant to replace the old covenant which sinful Israel has broken." The Old Testament describes three types of vicarious atonement which result in purity or sinlessness: the Paschal Lamb; "the sacrificial system as a whole," with the Day of Atonement as the most essential element; and the idea of the suffering servant (Isaiah 42:1–9, 49:1–6, 50:4–11, 52:13–53:12), "the action of a Divinely sent Servant of the Lord who was 'wounded for our transgressions' and 'bear the sin of many'." The Old Testament Apocrypha adds a fourth idea, namely the righteous martyr (2 Maccabees, 4 Maccabees, Wisdom 2–5).

These traditions of atonement offer only temporary forgiveness, and korbanot (offerings) could only be used as a means of atoning for the lightest type of sin, that is sins committed in ignorance that the thing was a sin. (Note: Sins in Judaism consist of different grades of severity: The lightest is the ḥeṭ, ḥaṭṭa'ah, or ḥaṭṭat (lit. 'fault, shortcoming, misstep'), an infraction of a commandment committed in ignorance of the existence or meaning of that command.; The second kind is the awon, a breach of a minor commandment committed with a full knowledge of the existence and nature of that commandment (bemezid).; The gravest kind is the pesha or mered, a presumptuous and rebellious act against God. Its worst form is the resha, such an act committed with a wicked intention.) In addition, korbanot have no expiating effect unless the person making the offering sincerely repents of their actions before making the offering, and makes restitution to any person who was harmed by the violation. Marcus Borg notes that animal sacrifice in Second Temple Judaism was not a "payment for sin", but had a basic meaning as "making something sacred by giving it as a gift to God," and included a shared meal with God. Sacrifices had numerous purposes, namely thanksgiving, petition, purification, and reconciliation. None of them was a "payment or substitution or satisfaction", and even "sacrifices of reconciliation were about restoring the relationship." James F. McGrath refers to 4 Maccabees 6, "which presents a martyr praying “Be merciful to your people, and let our punishment suffice for them. Make my blood their purification, and take my life in exchange for theirs” (4 Macc. 6:28-29). Clearly there were ideas that existed in the Judaism of the time that helped make sense of the death of the righteous in terms of atonement."

=== New Testament ===
==== Jerusalem ekklēsia ====
1 Corinthians 15:3–8 contains the kerygma of the early Christians:

[3] For I handed on to you as of first importance what I in turn had received: that Christ died for our sins in accordance with the scriptures, [4] and that he was buried, and that he was raised on the third day in accordance with the scriptures, [5] and that he appeared to Cephas, then to the twelve. [6] Then he appeared to more than five hundred brothers and sisters at one time, most of whom are still alive, though some have died. [7] Then he appeared to James, then to all the apostles. [8] Last of all, as to one untimely born, he appeared also to me.

— 1 Corinthians 15:3–41

In the Jerusalem ekklēsia, from which Paul received this creed, the phrase "died for our sins" probably was an apologetic rationale for the death of Jesus as being part of God's plan and purpose, as evidenced in the scriptures. The phrase "died for our sins" was derived from Isaiah, especially Isaiah 53:1–11, and 4 Maccabees, especially 4 Maccabees 6:28–29. (Note: James F. McGrath refers to 4 Maccabees 6, "which presents a martyr praying "Be merciful to your people, and let our punishment suffice for them. Make my blood their purification, and take my life in exchange for theirs" (4 Maccabees 6:28–29). Clearly there were ideas that existed in the Judaism of the time that helped make sense of the death of the righteous in terms of atonement." See also Herald Gandi (2018), The Resurrection: "According to the Scriptures"?, referring to Isaiah 53, among others: "[4] Surely he has borne our infirmities and carried our diseases; yet we accounted him stricken, struck down by God, and afflicted. [5] But he was wounded for our transgressions, crushed for our iniquities; upon him was the punishment that made us whole, and by his bruises we are healed [...] [10] Yet it was the will of the Lord to crush him with pain. When you make his life an offering for sin, he shall see his offspring, and shall prolong his days; through him the will of the Lord shall prosper. [11] Out of his anguish he shall see light; he shall find satisfaction through his knowledge. The righteous one, my servant, shall make many righteous, and he shall bear their iniquities.") "Raised on the third day" is derived from Hosea 6:1–2:

Come, let us return to the Lord;
for he has torn us, that he may heal us;
he has struck us down, and he will bind us up.
After two days he will revive us;
on the third day he will raise us up,
that we may live before him." (Note: See Why was Resurrection on "the Third Day"? Two Insights for explanations on the phrase "third day." See also 2 Kings 20:8: "Hezekiah said to Isaiah, "What shall be the sign that the Lord will heal me, and that I shall go up to the house of the Lord on the third day?*" According to Sheehan, Paul's reference to Jesus having risen "on the third day [...] simply expresses the belief that Jesus was rescued from the fate of utter absence from God (death) and was admitted to the saving presence of God (the eschatological future).")

Soon after his death, Jesus's followers believed he was raised from death by God and exalted to divine status as Lord (Kyrios) "at God's 'right hand'," which "associates him in astonishing ways with God." (Note: The worship of God as expressed in the phrase "call upon the name of the Lord [Yahweh]" was also applied to Jesus, invoking his name "in corporate worship and in the wider devotional pattern of Christian believers (e.g., baptism, exorcism, healing).") According to Hurtado, powerful religious experiences were an indispensable factor in the emergence of this Christ-devotion. Those experiences "seem to have included visions of (and/or ascents to) God's heaven, in which the glorified Christ was seen in an exalted position." (Note: These visions may mostly have appeared during corporate worship. Johan Leman contends that the communal meals provided a context in which participants entered a state of mind in which the presence of Jesus was felt.) Those experiences were interpreted in the framework of God's redemptive purposes, as reflected in the scriptures, in a "dynamic interaction between devout, prayerful searching for, and pondering over, scriptural texts and continuing powerful religious experiences." This initiated a "new devotional pattern unprecedented in Jewish monotheism," that is, the worship of Jesus next to God, giving a central place to Jesus because his ministry, and its consequences, had a strong impact on his early followers. Revelations, including those visions, but also inspired and spontaneous utterances, and "charismatic exegesis" of the Jewish scriptures, convinced them that this devotion was commanded by God.

==== Paul ====
The meaning of the kerygma of 1 Corinthians 15:3–8 for Paul is a matter of debate, and open to multiple interpretations. For Paul, "dying for our sins" gained a deeper significance, providing "a basis for the salvation of sinful Gentiles apart from the Torah."

Traditionally, this kerygma is interpreted as meaning that Jesus's death was an "atonement" for sin, or a ransom, or a means of propitiating God or expiating God's wrath against humanity because of their sins. With Jesus's death, humanity was freed from this wrath. (Note: Atonement: Briscoe and Ogilvie (2003): "Paul says that Christ's ransom price is his blood."; Cobb: "The question is whether Paul thought that God sacrificed Jesus to atone for human sins. During the past thousand years, this idea has often been viewed in the Western church as at the heart of Christianity, and many of those who uphold it have appealed to Paul as its basis [...] In fact, the word "atonement" is lacking in many standard translations. The King James Translation uses "propitiation", and the Revised Standard Version uses "expiation." The American Translation reads: "For God showed him publicly dying as a sacrifice of reconciliation to be taken advantage of through faith." The Good News Bible renders the meaning as: "God offered him, so that by his sacrificial death he should become the means by which people's sins are forgiven through their faith in him." Despite this variety, and the common avoidance of the word "atonement," all these translations agree with the New Revised Standard Version in suggesting that God sacrificed Jesus so that people could be reconciled to God through faith. All thereby support the idea that is most directly formulated by the use of the word "atonement." (Cobb himself disagrees with this view.)) In the classical Protestant understanding humans partake in this salvation by faith in Jesus Christ; this faith is a grace given by God, and people are justified by God through Jesus Christ and faith in him.

A predecessor researcher for the New Perspective on Paul (in 1963) raised several concerns regarding these interpretations. The traditional interpretation sees Paul's understanding of salvation as involving "an exposition of the individual's relation to God." According to Krister Stendahl, the main concern of Paul's writings on Jesus's role, and salvation by faith, is not the individual conscience of human sinners, and their doubts about being chosen by God or not, but the problem of the inclusion of Gentile (Greek) Torah observers into God's covenant. (Note: Dunn 1982, p. n.49 quotes Stendahl 1976, p. 2 "... a doctrine of faith was hammered out by Paul for the very specific and limited purpose of defending the rights of Gentile converts to be full and genuine heirs to the promise of God to Israel" Westerholm 2015, pp. 4–15: "For Paul, the question that "justification by faith" was intended to answer was, "On what terms can Gentiles gain entrance to the people of God?" Bent on denying any suggestion that Gentiles must become Jews and keep the Jewish law, he answered, "By faith—and not by works of the (Jewish) law."" Westerholm refers to: Stendahl 1963, pp. 199–215 reprinted in Stendahl 1976, pp. 78–96 Westerholm 2015, p. 496 quotes Sanders: "Sanders noted that "the salvation of the Gentiles is essential to Paul's preaching; and with it falls the law; for, as Paul says simply, Gentiles cannot live by the law (Gal. 2.14)". On a similar note, Sanders suggested that the only Jewish "boasting" to which Paul objected was that which exulted over the divine privileges granted to Israel and failed to acknowledge that God, in Christ, had opened the door of salvation to Gentiles.") Paul draws on several interpretative frames to solve this problem, but most importantly, his own experience and understanding. The kerygma from 1 Cor.15:3-5 refers to two mythologies: the Greek myth of the noble dead, to which the Maccabean notion of martyrdom and dying for ones people is related; and the Jewish myth of the persecuted sage or righteous man, in particular the "story of the child of wisdom." For Paul, the notion of 'dying for' refers to this martyrdom and persecution. According to Burton Mack, 'Dying for our sins' refers to the problem of Gentile Torah-observers, who, despite their faithfulness, cannot fully observe commandments, including circumcision, and are therefore 'sinners', excluded from God's covenant. Jesus's death and resurrection solved this problem of the exclusion of the Gentiles from God's covenant, as indicated by Romans 3:21–26.

According to E.P. Sanders, who initiated the New Perspective on Paul, Paul saw the faithful redeemed by participation in Jesus's death and rising. But "Jesus's death substituted for that of others and thereby freed believers from sin and guilt," a metaphor derived from "ancient sacrificial theology," the essence of Paul's writing is not in the "legal terms" regarding the expiation of sin, but the act of "participation in Christ through dying and rising with him." (Note: Jordan Cooper: "Sanders sees Paul's motifs of salvation as more participationist than juristic. The reformation overemphasized the judicial categories of forgiveness and escape from condemnation, while ignoring the real heart of salvation, which is a mystical participation in Christ. Paul shows this in his argument in his first epistle to the Corinthians when arguing against sexual immorality. It is wrong because it affects one's union with Christ by uniting himself to a prostitute. Sin is not merely the violation of an abstract law. This participationist language is also used in Corinthians in the discussion of the Lord's Supper wherein one participates in the body and blood of Christ." (Note: Jordan Cooper, E.P. Sanders and the New Perspective on Paul)) According to Sanders, "those who are baptized into Christ are baptized into his death, and thus they escape the power of sin [...] he died so that the believers may die with him and consequently live with him." James F. McGrath notes that Paul "prefers to use the language of participation. One died for all, so that all died (2 Corinthians 5:14). This is not only different from substitution, it is the opposite of it." By this participation in Christ's death and rising, "one receives forgiveness for past offences, is liberated from the powers of sin, and receives the Spirit." Paul insists that salvation is received by the grace of God; according to Sanders, this insistence is in line with Judaism of c. 200 BCE until 200 CE, which saw God's covenant with Israel as an act of grace of God. Observance of the Law is needed to maintain the covenant, but the covenant is not earned by observing the Law, but by the grace of God.

Several passages from Paul, such as Romans 3:25, (Note: Stubs: Rom 3:22, 26; Gal. 2:16, 20; 3:22, 26; Phil. 3:9; Eph. 3:12, 4:13; Tonstad: Rom 1:17; 3:21, 22, 25; Gal 3:23, 25) are traditionally interpreted as meaning that humanity is saved by faith in Christ. According to Richard B. Hays, who initiated the "Pistis Christou debate," (Note: See also: Arland J. Hultgren, Paul's Letter to the Romans: A Commentary, Appendix 3: "Pistis Christou: Faith in or of Christ?"; Pistis Christou Debate Timeline) a different reading of these passages is also possible. The phrase pistis Christou can be translated as 'faith in Christ', that is, salvation by believing in Christ, the traditional interpretation; or as 'faithfulness of Christ', that is, belief "through the faithfulness of Jesus Christ." (Note: Still & Longenecker (2014): "For many interpreters, certain passages within Paul's letters take on a much fuller theological dimension when they are seen to include a reference to the faith(fulnes) of Jesus Christ. In a passage like Rom 3:21–26, for instance, the inbreaking of God's faithful righteousness is not simply "to all who believe," but is to all who believe "through the faithfulness of Jesus Christ".") In this view, according to Cobb, Jesus's life and death was not seen by Paul as an atonement, but as a means to participate in faithfulness. In this interpretation, Romans 3:21–26 states that Jesus was faithful, even to the cost of death, and justified by God for this faithfulness. Those who participate in this faithfulness are equally justified by God, both Jews and Gentiles. (Note: Cobb notes that, in this view, Paul did not propagate a moral influence theory, but something more: "Jesus saves us by being radically faithful. This faithfulness shows us the true character of God's justice. This whole passage emphasizes God's disclosing and demonstrating this paradoxical justice that would more typically be called mercy. The disclosure transforms the relation of God and the world from one of wrath of one of love. Human participation is this new transformed situation is by faithfulness. This faithfulness is a participation in the faithfulness of Jesus. God views those who participate in Jesus's faithfulness in terms of the justice to which they thereby attain rather than in terms of their continuing sinfulness. This participation in Jesus's faithfulness entails readiness to suffer with Jesus. In baptism we participate in Jesus's death and burial. By thus being united with Jesus, the faithful live in confidence that they will rise with him and share in his glory.") While this view has found support by a range of scholars, it has also been questioned and criticized.

==== Gospels ====
In the Gospels, Jesus is portrayed as calling for repentance from sin, and saying that God wants mercy rather than sacrifices (Matthew 9:13). Yet, he is also portrayed as "giving His life [as] a ransom for many" and applying the "suffering servant" passage of Isaiah 53 to himself (Luke 22:37). The Gospel of John portrays him as the sacrificial Lamb of God, and compares his death to the sacrifice of the Passover Lamb at Pesach.

Christians assert that Jesus was predicted by Isaiah, as attested in Luke 4:16–22, where Jesus is portrayed as saying that the prophecies in Isaiah were about him. (Note: Luke 4:16–22: "And He came to Nazareth, where He had been brought up; and as was His custom, He entered the synagogue on the Sabbath, and stood up to read. And the book of the prophet Isaiah was handed to Him. And He opened the book and found the place where it was written, 'THE SPIRIT OF THE LORD IS UPON ME, BECAUSE HE ANOINTED ME TO PREACH THE GOSPEL TO THE POOR. HE HAS SENT ME TO PROCLAIM RELEASE TO THE CAPTIVES, AND RECOVERY OF SIGHT TO THE BLIND, TO SET FREE THOSE WHO ARE OPPRESSED, TO PROCLAIM THE FAVORABLE YEAR OF THE LORD.' And He closed the book, gave it back to the attendant and sat down; and the eyes of all in the synagogue were fixed on Him. And He began to say to them, 'Today this Scripture has been fulfilled in your hearing.'") The New Testament explicitly quotes from Isaiah 53 in Matthew 8:16–18 to indicate that Jesus is the fulfillment of these prophecies.

=== Classic paradigm ===
The classic paradigm entails the traditional understandings of the early Church Fathers, who developed the themes found in the New Testament.

==== Ransom from Satan ====
The ransom theory of atonement says that Christ liberated humanity from slavery to sin and Satan, and thus death, by giving his own life as a ransom sacrifice to Satan, swapping the life of the perfect (Jesus), for the lives of the imperfect (other humans). It entails the idea that God deceived the devil, and that Satan, or death, had "legitimate rights" over sinful souls in the afterlife, due to the fall of man and inherited sin. During the first millennium AD, the ransom theory of atonement was the dominant metaphor for atonement, both in eastern and western Christianity, until it was replaced in the west by Anselm's satisfaction theory of atonement.

In one version of the idea of deception, Satan attempted to take Jesus's soul after he had died, but in doing so over-extended his authority, as Jesus had never sinned. As a consequence, Satan lost his authority completely, and all humanity gained freedom. In another version, God entered into a deal with Satan, offering to trade Jesus's soul in exchange for the souls of all people, but after the trade, God raised Jesus from the dead and left Satan with nothing. Other versions held that Jesus's divinity was masked by his human form, so Satan tried to take Jesus's soul without realizing that his divinity would destroy Satan's power. Another idea is that Jesus came to teach how not to sin and Satan, in anger with this, tried to take his soul.

The ransom theory was first clearly enunciated by Irenaeus (c. 130 – c. 202), who was an outspoken critic of Gnosticism, but borrowed ideas from their dualistic worldview. In this worldview, humankind is under the power of the Demiurge, a lesser god who created the world. Yet, humans have a spark of the true divine nature within them, which can be liberated by gnosis (knowledge) of this divine spark. This knowledge is revealed by the Logos, "the very mind of the supreme God," who entered the world in the person of Jesus. Nevertheless, the Logos could not simply undo the power of the Demiurge, and had to hide his real identity, appearing in a physical form, thereby misleading the Demiurge, and liberating humankind. In Irenaeus' writings, the Demiurge is replaced by the devil.

Origen (184–253) introduced the idea that the devil held legitimate rights over humans, who were bought free by the blood of Christ. He also introduced the notion that the Devil was deceived in thinking that he could master the human soul.

Gustaf Aulén reinterpreted the ransom theory in his study Christus Victor (1931), calling it the Christus Victor doctrine, arguing that Christ's death was not a payment to the Devil, but defeated the powers of evil, particularly Satan, which had held humankind in their dominion. According to Pugh, "Ever since [Aulén's] time, we call these patristic ideas the Christus Victor way of seeing the cross."

==== Recapitulation theory ====
The recapitulation view, first comprehensively expressed by Irenaeus, went "hand-in-hand" with the ransom theory. It says that Christ succeeds where Adam failed, undoing the wrong that Adam did and, because of his union with humanity, leads humanity on to eternal life, including moral perfection. Theosis ("divinisation") is a "corollary" of the recapitulation.

=== Objective paradigm ===
==== Satisfaction ====
In the 11th century, Anselm of Canterbury rejected the ransom view and proposed the satisfaction theory of atonement. He allegedly depicted God as a feudal lord whose honor had been offended by the sins of humankind. In this view, people needed salvation from the divine punishment that these offences would bring, since nothing they could do could repay the honor debt. Anselm held that Christ had infinitely honored God through his life and death and that Christ could repay what humanity owed God, thus satisfying the offence to God's honor and doing away with the need for punishment. When Anselm proposed the satisfaction view, it was immediately criticized by Peter Abelard.

==== Penal substitution ====
In the 16th century, the Protestant Reformers reinterpreted Anselm's satisfaction theory of salvation within a legal paradigm. In the legal system, offences required punishment, and no satisfaction could be given to avert this need. They proposed a theory known as penal substitution, in which Christ takes the penalty of people's sin as their substitute, thus saving people from God's wrath against sin. Penal substitution thus presents Jesus saving people from the divine punishment of their past wrongdoings. However, this salvation is not presented as automatic. Rather, a person must have faith in order to receive this free gift of salvation. In the penal substitution view, salvation is not dependent upon human effort or deeds.

The penal substitution paradigm of salvation is widely held among Protestants, who often consider it central to Christianity. However, it has also been widely critiqued, and is rejected by liberal Christians as un-Biblical, and an offense to the love of God. (Note: J. Kenneth Grider, The Governmental Theory .) According to Richard Rohr, "[t]hese theories are based on retributive justice rather than the restorative justice that the prophets and Jesus taught." Advocates of the New Perspective on Paul also argue that many New Testament epistles of Paul the Apostle, which are used to support the theory of penal substitution, should be interpreted differently.

==== Governmental theory ====
The "governmental theory of atonement" teaches that Christ suffered for humanity so that God could forgive humans without punishing them while still maintaining divine justice. It is traditionally taught in Arminian circles that draw primarily from the works of Hugo Grotius.

=== Subjective paradigm ===
==== Moral transformation ====
The "moral influence theory of atonement" was developed, or most notably propagated, by Abelard (1079–1142), (Note: Pugh notes that "the very earliest Patristic writings [...] lean towards a moralistic interpretation of the cross", but rejects the idea that this constituted a full-fledged theory of moral influence atonement. He mentions A. J. Wallace and R. D. Rusk (2011), Moral Transformation: The Original Christian Paradigm of Salvation as a "recent attempt to prove at length that 'moral transformation' was 'the original Christian paradigm of salvation.' This work consists of a totally one-sided presentation of biblical and historical data." According to Beilby and Eddy, subjective theories, of which Abelard's is one, emphasize God's love for humanity, and focus on changing man's attitude. According to Beilby and Eddy, "[a]ny New Testament text that proclaim's God's love for humanity and consequent desire to save sinners can be brought forth as evidence for this interpretation of the atonement.") as an alternative to Anselm's satisfaction theory. Abelard not only "rejected the idea of Jesus's death as a ransom paid to the devil", which turned the Devil into a rival god, but also objected to the idea that Jesus's death was a "debt paid to God's honor". He also objected to the emphasis on God's judgment, and the idea that God changed his mind after the sinner accepted Jesus's sacrificial death, which was not easily reconcilable with the idea of "the perfect, impassible God [who] does not change". Abelard focused on changing man's perception of God – not to be seen as offended, harsh, and judgemental, but as loving. According to Abelard, "Jesus died as the demonstration of God's love", a demonstration which can change the hearts and minds of the sinners, turning back to God.

During the Protestant Reformation in Western Christianity, the majority of the Reformers strongly rejected the moral influence view of the atonement in favor of penal substitution, a highly forensic modification of the honor-oriented Anselmian satisfaction model. However, Fausto Sozzini's Socinian arm of the Reformation maintained a belief in the moral influence view of the atonement. Socinianism was an early form of Unitarianism, and the Unitarian Church today maintains a moral influence view of the atonement, as do many liberal Protestant theologians of the modern age.

During the 18th century, versions of the moral influence view found overwhelming support among German theologians, most notably the Enlightenment philosopher Immanuel Kant. In the 19th and 20th century, it has been popular among liberal Protestant thinkers in the Anglican, Methodist, Lutheran, and Presbyterian churches, including the Anglican theologian Hastings Rashdall. A number of English theological works in the last hundred years have advocated and popularized the moral influence theory of atonement.

A strong division has remained since the Reformation between liberal Protestants (who typically adopt a moral influence view) and conservative Protestants (who typically adopt a penal substitutionary view). Both sides believe that their position is taught by the Bible. (Note: William C. Placher: "Debates about how Christ saves us have tended to divide Protestants into conservatives who defended some form of substitutionary atonement theory and liberals who were more apt to accept a kind of moral influence theory. Both those approaches were about 900 years old. Recently, new accounts of Christ's salvific work have been introduced or reintroduced, and the debates have generally grown angrier, at least from the liberal side. Those who defended substitutionary atonement were always ready to dismiss their opponents as heretics; now some of their opponents complain that a focus on substitutionary atonement leads to violence against women and to child abuse.")

==== Moral example theory ====
A related theory, the "moral example theory", was developed by Faustus Socinus (1539–1604) in his work De Jesu Christo servatore (1578). He rejected the idea of "vicarious satisfaction". (Note: Christ suffering for, or punished for, the sinners.) According to Socinus, Jesus's death offers us a perfect example of self-sacrificial dedication to God."

A number of theologians see "example" (or "exemplar") theories of the atonement as variations of the moral influence theory. Wayne Grudem, however, argues that "Whereas the moral influence theory says that Christ's death teaches us how much God loves us, the example theory says that Christ's death teaches us how we should live." Grudem identifies the Socinians as supporters of the example theory.

=== Other theories ===
==== Embracement theory ====
Domenic Marbaniang sees the divine voluntary self-giving as the ultimate embracement of humanity in its ultimate act of sin, viz, deicide, or the murder of God, thus canceling sin on the cross. (Note: Marbaniang 2018, p. 12: "The depth of estrangement and contortion was manifest in the kind of death administered: the death of the cross. Yet, the real story is not that the world rejected Him; the real story is that He was willing to let the world reject Him. Divine self-emptying, divine servanthood, and divine crucifixion are powerful themes that shock the philosophy of religion. Nietzsche called the greatest of all sins to be the murder of God (deicide). There was nothing more sinful than that. On the reverse, the greatest of all righteousness fulfilled was in the self-giving of the Son of God. This self-giving brought an end to the history of hostility between man and God. It cancelled all debts. Man had committed the greatest of all crimes, and God had allowed it to be done to Him in the ultimate divine sacrifice. The Cross was where Justice and Love met vis-à-vis. It was where man affirmed his estrangement and God affirmed His belongedness. It was where God accepted man as he was. The one act of righteousness by the Son of God nullified forever the writ of accusation against all humanity.") Accordingly, the Cross becomes the moment and locus in history where the world is split into those who identify with the crucifiers of Christ and those who are regarded as crucified with Christ.

==== Shared atonement theory ====
Southern Baptist theologian David Jeremiah writes that in the "shared atonement" theory the atonement is spoken of as shared by all. To wit, God sustains the Universe. Therefore, if Jesus was God in human form, when he died, the entirety of humanity died with him, and when he rose from the dead, the entirety of humanity rose with him.

=== Compatibility of differing theories ===
Some theologians maintain that "various biblical understandings of the atonement need not conflict". Reformed theologian J. I. Packer, for example, although he maintains that "penal substitution is the mainstream, historic view of the church and the essential meaning of the Atonement... Yet with penal substitution at the center", he also maintains that "Christus Victor and other Scriptural views of atonement can work together to present a fully orbed picture of Christ's work". J. Kenneth Grider, speaking from a governmental theory perspective, says that the governmental theory can incorporate within itself "numerous understandings promoted in the other major Atonement theories", including ransom theory, elements of the "Abelardian 'moral influence' theory", vicarious aspects of the atonement, etc.

Anglican theologian Oliver Chase Quick described differing theories as being of value, but also denied that any particular theory was fully true, saying, "if we start from the fundamental and cardinal thought of God's act of love in Jesus Christ [...] I think we can reach a reconciling point of view, from which each type of theory is seen to make its essential contribution to the truth, although no one theory, no any number of theories, can be sufficient to express its fullness."

Others say that some models of the atonement naturally exclude each other. James F. McGrath, for example, talking about the atonement, says that "Paul [...] prefers to use the language of participation. One died for all, so that all died (2 Corinthians 5:14). This is not only different from substitution, it is the opposite of it." Similarly, Mark M. Mattison, in his article The Meaning of the Atonement says, "Substitution implies an "either/or"; participation implies a "both/and."" (Note: Mark M. Mattison, The Meaning of the Atonement (accessed 30/12/10). See section entitled Substitution or Participation?) J. Kenneth Grider, quoted above showing the compatibility of various atonement models with the governmental theory, nevertheless also says that both penal substitution and satisfaction atonement theories are incompatible with the governmental theory.

In Mere Christianity, C.S. Lewis comments that none of the various theories should be regarded as Christianity. "The central Christian belief," he says, "is that Christ's death has somehow put us right with God and given us a fresh start. Theories as to how it did this are another matter. A good many different theories have been held as to how it works; what all Christians are agreed on is that it does work."

=== Confusion of terms ===
Some confusion can occur when discussing the atonement because the terms used sometimes have differing meanings depending on the contexts in which they are used. For example:

- Sometimes substitutionary atonement is used to refer to penal substitution alone, when the term also has a broader sense including other atonement models that are not penal.
- Penal substitution is also sometimes described as a type of satisfaction atonement, but the term 'satisfaction atonement' functions primarily as a technical term to refer particularly to Anselm's theory.
- Substitutionary and penal themes are found within the Patristic (and later) literature, but they are not used in a penal substitutionary sense until the Reformed period.
- 'Substitution', as well as potentially referring to specific theories of the atonement (e.g. penal substitution), is also sometimes used in a less technical way—for example, when used in 'the sense that [Jesus, through his death,] did for us that which we can never do for ourselves'.
- The phrase 'vicarious atonement' is sometimes used as a synonym for penal substitution, and is also sometimes used to describe other, non-penal substitutionary, theories of atonement. Care needs to be taken to understand what is being referred to by the various terms used in different contexts.

== Eastern Christianity ==
According to Eastern Christian theology, based upon their understanding of the atonement as put forward by Irenaeus recapitulation theory, Jesus's death is a ransom. This restores the relation with God, who is loving and reaches out to humanity, and offers the possibility of theosis or divinization, becoming the kind of humans God wants us to be. Salvation is seen as participation in the renewal of human nature itself by way of the eternal Word of God assuming the human nature in its fullness.

In contrast to Western branches of theology, Eastern Orthodox Christians tend to use the word "expiation" with regard to what is accomplished in the sacrificial act. In Orthodox theology, expiation is an act of offering that seeks to change the one making the offering. The Biblical Greek word which is translated both as "propitiation" and as "expiation" is hilasmos (I John 2:2, 4:10), which means "to make acceptable and enable one to draw close to God". Thus, the Eastern Orthodox emphasis would be that Christ died, not to appease an angry and vindictive Father or to avert the wrath of God upon sinners, but to defeat and secure the destruction of sin and death, so that those who are fallen and in spiritual bondage may become divinely transfigured, and therefore fully human, as their Creator intended; that is to say, human creatures become God in his energies or operations but not in his essence or identity, conforming to the image of Christ and reacquiring the divine likeness (see theosis). It further teaches that a person abides in Christ and makes his salvation sure not only by works of love, but also by his patient suffering of various griefs, illnesses, misfortunes and failures. (Note: (Luke 16:19-31, Mark 8:31-38, Romans 6:3-11, Hebrews 12:1-3, Galatians 6:14).)

The Oriental Orthodox view is largely similar to the Eastern Orthodox view but varies with regard to certain doctrines espoused by Gregory Palamas in the 13th century. In Palamism, man becomes "uncreated, unoriginated and indescribable" at Theosis, a concept rejected by the Oriental Orthodox Churches where man becomes deified to the extent permitted by human nature. In this paradigm, man does not become fully divine and equal to the Godhead in attributes, but perpetually gets closer and closer to it, without ever becoming consubstantial with God the Father.

== Catholicism ==
The Catholic Church teaches that the death of Jesus on the Cross is a sacrifice that redeems man and reconciles man to God. The sacrifice of Jesus is both a "gift from God the Father himself, for the Father handed his Son over to sinners in order to reconcile us with himself" and "the offering of the Son of God made man, who in freedom and love offered his life to his Father through the Holy Spirit in reparation for our disobedience."

Catholic theologians often explain salvation by dividing it into justification—which relates to infused faith and how justice is satisfied—and sanctification—which relates to infused charity and our capacity for happiness at the beatific vision, some emphasizing their intertwinedness more than others. Catholic theology also affirms that salvation is communal: the salvation of any one individual is "inseparable from the salvation of others".

A separate usage is "salvation from Purgatory" (i.e., related to sanctification) rather than salvation from sin and punishment (i.e., related to justification): this usage is rarer but examples are found by Catholics, Protestants, and academics.

=== Tridentine definition ===
The Catholic view of Christ's redemptive work was set forth formally at the Sixth Session of the Council of Trent. The council stated that Jesus merited the grace of justification, which is not only the remission of sin but the infusion of the virtues of faith, hope, and charity into the Christian. A justified Christian is then said to be in the state of grace, which state can be lost by committing a mortal sin, entering a state of sin.

The view which prevailed at the Council of Trent has been described as a "combination of the opinions of Anselm and Abelard". Catholic scholars have noted that Abelard did not teach that Jesus was merely a good moral example, but that Christians are truly saved by His sacrifice on the Cross.

The moral transformation of the Christian is not the result of merely following Christ's example and teachings, but a supernatural gift merited by the sacrifice of Jesus, for "by one man's obedience many will be made righteous".

=== Co-operation with grace ===
While the initial grace of justification is merited solely by the sacrifice of Jesus, the Catholic Church teaches that a justified Christian can merit an "increase" in justification and the attainment of eternal life by cooperating with God's grace. The grace of final perseverance preserves a justified Christian in the state of grace until his or her death.

The practical manner of salvation is expounded on by Alphonsus Liguori, a Doctor of the Church:

... to gain Heaven, it is necessary to walk in the straight road that leads to eternal bliss. This road is the observance of the divine commands. Hence, in his preaching, the Baptist exclaimed: "Make straight the way of the Lord." In order to be able to walk always in the way of the Lord, without turning to the right or to the left, it is necessary to adopt the proper means. These means are, first, diffidence in ourselves; secondly, confidence in God; thirdly, resistance to temptations.

— Sermons for all the Sundays in the year, Sermon III. Third Sunday of Advent: On the means necessary for salvation

Pope Leo XIII distinguished between objective and subjective Redemption.

Hence we cannot doubt that she greatly grieved in the soul in the most harsh anguishes and torments of her Son. Further, the divine sacrifice had to be completed with her present and looking on, for which she had generously nourished the victim herself ... There stood by the Cross of Jesus, Mary his Mother ... of her own accord she offered her Son to the divine justice, dying with him in her heart, transfixed by the sword of sorrow.

=== Divinization ===
The Catholic Church shares the Eastern Christian belief in divinization, teaching that "the Son of God became man so that we might become God." However, in contrast with the Eastern Orthodox notion of theosis in which the divinized Christian becomes God in his energies or operations, the Catholic Church teaches that the ultimate end of divinization is the beatific vision, in which the divinized Christian will see God's essence.

=== Fate of the dead ===
The Catholic Church does not believe in Christian universalism (i.e., all or most people go to heaven), in double predestination (i.e., some, most, or all people are destined to sin and hell), in Feeneyism (i.e., non-Catholics and excommunicated Catholics cannot be saved), or in how many people will go to heaven or hell (either most or few or some people). But the church does say that dying in the state of final impenitence—which is refusing to repent of sin at the moment of death, the consequence of which is eternal punishment—leads to hell. The church also says that dying in the state of perfection (being without sin and punishment) leads to heaven, while dying in the state of either original sin (which is not a sin but the lack of sanctifying grace) or repentant sin (whether mortal or venial sin) lead to purgatory—unless the unbaptized sinful soul receives baptism or the baptized sinful soul receives anointing of the sick and the Apostolic Pardon, in which case, the soul goes to heaven.

Fate of the dead in Catholicism
If one dies in	Then one goes to	For a duration of
1. Final impenitence, with or without original sin	Hell	Eternity
2. Original sin only	Hell	Limbo
3. No original sin, but repentant sin	Purgatory	Temporary before going to heaven (see #6)
4. No sin at all, but temporary punishment	Purgatory	Temporary before going to heaven (see #6)
5. No sin at all and no punishment at all	Heaven	Eternity

=== Fate of the Universe ===
Salvation in Catholic theology is intended for the whole of creation, not just for angels and people. The Universe's salvation—i.e., being freed from evil and filled with all good things—will come at the end of time, as the Universe is unconditionally predestined for deification at the Last Judgment. Only humans and angels' predestination for deification is conditioned, and that on moral behavior, because of their freewill. By deification, all of creation (save for the demons and the damned) will be perfect and happy beyond comprehension because everything will share in God's own perfection and happiness. This deification cannot be obtained, experienced, or foretasted before the Last Judgment because there is nothing in the Universe that is infinitely and supernaturally perfect and happy—only finitely and naturally perfect or happy. Nonetheless, baptism grants a foretaste of eternal life, which is the beginning of deification and a pledge of the Universe's future salvation, via sanctifying grace. Eternal life in heaven entails the deification of the soul and, via the universal resurrection at the Last Judgment, the deified soul will be permanently reunited with its body, which itself will be deified. While the deified soul in heaven experiences the beatific vision with its whole self (personality, imagination, intellect, will, conscience, reason, virtue, self-image, relationship with others, etc.), the deified body will also experience the beatific vision with its whole self (all five senses, life, activity, presence, movement, appearance, talents, attire, needs, etc.), so that the whole person—body and soul—will be saved, i.e., deified and experience the beatific vision. As part of its deification, the deified body will be like Jesus's own deified resurrected body, which means being endowed with impassibility (immunity to evil, including temptation, sin, demons, inconvenience, error, boredom, fear, suffering, and death), subtility (freedom from the restraint of spacetime, meaning the saint can shapeshift, time travel, control nature, teleport, and have superhuman senses and prowess), agility (obedience to the soul, just as the soul is obedient to God), and clarity (resplendent beauty and the five crowns). With the Last Judgment, the demons will no longer be allowed to act outside of hell (such as temptation and possession), the Universe will be made immune to evil, evil will no longer be possible, and the Universe will be infinitely greater than the most idyllic paradise conceivable.

== Protestantism ==
Protestant beliefs about salvation
This table summarizes the classical views of three Protestant beliefs about salvation.
Topic	Calvinism	Lutheranism	Arminianism
Human will	Total depravity: Humanity possesses "free will", but it is in bondage to sin, until it is "transformed".	Total depravity: Humanity possesses free will in regard to "goods and possessions", but is sinful by nature and unable to contribute to its own salvation.	Total depravity: Humanity possesses freedom from necessity, but not "freedom from sin" unless enabled by "prevenient grace".
Election	Unconditional election.	Unconditional election.	Conditional election in view of foreseen faith or unbelief.
Justification and atonement	Justification by faith alone. Various views regarding the extent of the atonement.	Justification for all men, completed at Christ's death and effective through faith alone.	Justification made possible for all through Christ's death, but only completed upon choosing faith in Jesus.
Conversion	Monergistic, through the means of grace, irresistible.	Monergistic, through the means of grace, resistible.	Synergistic, resistible due to the common grace of free will.
Perseverance and apostasy	Perseverance of the saints: the eternally elect in Christ will certainly persevere in faith.	Holy Spirit strengthens the faith of the believer through the proclamation of the Word and participation in the sacraments; falling away is possible through loss of faith or mortal sin.	Preservation is conditional upon continued faith in Christ; with the possibility of a final apostasy.

In Protestantism, justifying grace is the result of God's initiative without any regard whatsoever to the one initiating the works, and no one can merit the justifying grace of God by performing rituals, good works, asceticism, or meditation. Broadly speaking, Protestants hold to the five solae of the Reformation, which declare that justification is attained by grace alone in Christ alone through faith alone for the Glory of God alone as told in Scripture alone. Magisterial Protestants, such as Lutherans, Anglicans and the Reformed, believe that justification is achieved through God's grace alone, and once justification is secured in the person, good works will be a result of this, allowing good works to often operate as a signifier for salvation (cf. sanctification). Some Protestants, such as Lutherans, Anglicans, and the Reformed, understand this to mean that God justifies solely by grace, and that works follow as a necessary consequence of justifying grace. Lutheranism holds that salvation can be forfeited with a loss of faith or through mortal sin, in contrast to the Reformed tradition that teaches that believers will persevere. Others, such as Methodists (and other Arminians), believe that justification is by faith alone, but that salvation can be forfeited if it is not accompanied by continued faith, obedience, and the works that naturally follow from it. Anabaptist theology holds to a "faith that works" as being salvific. Those who adhere to Free Grace theology, including certain Independent Baptists, firmly believe that salvation is accomplished by faith alone without any reference to works whatsoever, including the works that may follow salvation.

=== Lutheranism ===
Lutherans believe that Christ, through His death and resurrection, has obtained justification and atonement for all sinners. Lutheran churches believe that this is the central message in the Bible upon which the very existence of the churches depends. In Lutheranism, it is a message relevant to people of all races and social levels, of all times and places, for "the result of one trespass was condemnation for all men" (Romans 5:18). All need forgiveness of sins before God, and Scripture proclaims that all have been justified, for "the result of one act of righteousness was justification that brings life for all men" (Romans 5:18).

Lutheranism teaches that individuals receive this free gift of forgiveness and justification not on the basis of their own works, but only through faith (Sola fide):

For it is by grace you have been saved, through faith—and this is not from yourselves, it is the gift of God—not by works, so that no one can boast.

— Ephesians 2:8,9

Saving faith is the knowledge of, acceptance of, and trust in the promise of the Gospel. Even faith itself is seen as a gift of God, created in the hearts of Christians by the work of the Holy Spirit through the Word and Baptism. Faith is seen as an instrument that receives the gift of salvation, not something that causes salvation. Thus, Lutherans reject the "decision theology" which is common among modern evangelicals, such as Baptists and Methodists.

At the time of the justification of an individual, Lutherans teach that the process of sanctification commences, which is defined as "the Holy Spirit’s work which follows justification through faith and consists of renewing the believer and bringing forth in him works of renewal." In Lutheranism, sanctification has two components, including: "1.) The inner renewal of the Holy Spirit in the Christian, and 2.) the living out of that inner renewal in the Christian’s new life of good works." In the process of sanctification, humans cooperate with God, enabled by prevenient grace "for the Holy Spirit is given credit for our faith and for the surrender of the will to God (Romans 3:21-28; Galatians 3:10-14; Luther’s Works, Vo.26, p.106; Small Catechism, II.6)." The Formula of Concord teaches: "But the intellect and will of the unregenerate man are nothing else than subiectum convertendum, that is, that which is to be converted, it being the intellect and will of a spiritually dead man, in whom the Holy Ghost works conversion and renewal, towards which work man’s will that is to be converted does nothing, but suffers God alone to work in him, until he is regenerate; and then he works also with the Holy Ghost [cooperates] that which is pleasing to God in other good works that follow, in the way and to the extent fully set forth above" (SD II.90). The Lutheran Confessions hold that it is "necessary to exhort people to Christian discipline and good works, and to remind them how necessary it is that they exercise themselves in good words as an evidence of their faith and their gratitude toward God". For Christians, "good works are necessary fruits of faith in the life of a Christian and that they proceed from a renewed heart that is thankful to God for His mercy and love". These good works done by Christians are rewarded by God, with "each one receiving his/her own reward according to his/her labour". Those individuals who commit mortal sin "render themselves subject to divine wrath and eternal death unless, turned again, they are reconciled to God through faith."

=== Reformed ===
Reformed Christians (Continental Reformed, Presbyterians, Reformed Anglicans, and Congregationalists) believe in the predestination of the elect before the foundation of the world in accordance with Reformed (Calvinist) theology. All of the elect necessarily persevere in faith because God keeps them from falling away. Calvinists understand the doctrines of salvation to include the five points of Calvinism, typically arranged in English to form the acrostic "TULIP". (Note: The TULIP acrostic first appeared in Loraine Boettner's The Reformed Doctrine of Predestination. The names appearing in parentheses, while not forming an acrostic, are offered by theologian Roger Nicole in Steele & Thomas 1963)

- "Total depravity", also called "total inability", asserts that as a consequence of the fall of man into sin, every person born into the world is enslaved to the service of sin. People are not by nature inclined to love God with their whole heart, mind, or strength, but rather all are inclined to serve their own interests over those of their neighbor and to reject the rule of God. Thus, all people by their own faculties are morally unable to choose to follow God and be saved because they are unwilling to do so out of the necessity of their own natures. (The term "total" in this context refers to sin affecting every part of a person, not that every person is as evil as possible.) This doctrine is derived from Augustine's explanation of Original Sin.
- "Unconditional election" asserts that God has chosen from eternity those whom he will bring to himself not based on foreseen virtue, merit, or faith in those people; rather, it is unconditionally grounded in God's mercy alone. God has chosen from eternity to extend mercy to those he has chosen and to withhold mercy from those not chosen. Those chosen receive justification through Christ alone. Those not chosen receive the just wrath that is warranted for their sins against God
- "Limited atonement", also called "particular redemption" or "definite atonement", asserts that Jesus's substitutionary atonement was definite and certain in its purpose and in what it accomplished. This implies that only the sins of the elect were atoned for by Jesus's death. Calvinists do not believe, however, that the atonement is limited in its value or power, but rather that the atonement is limited in the sense that it is designed for some and not all. Hence, Calvinists hold that the atonement is sufficient for all and efficient for the elect. (Note: The Five Points of Calvinism. The Calvinist Corner. Retrieved 2011-11-12.) The doctrine is driven by the Calvinistic concept of the sovereignty of God in salvation and their understanding of the nature of the atonement.
- "Irresistible grace", also called "efficacious grace", asserts that the saving grace of God is effectually applied to those whom he has determined to save (that is, the elect) and, in God's timing, overcomes their resistance to obeying the call of the gospel, bringing them to a saving faith. This means that when God sovereignly purposes to save someone, that individual certainly will be saved. The doctrine holds that this purposeful influence of God's Holy Spirit cannot be resisted, but that the Holy Spirit, "graciously causes the elect sinner to cooperate, to believe, to repent, to come freely and willingly to Christ."
- "Perseverance of the saints", or "preservation of the saints", asserts that since God is sovereign and his will cannot be frustrated by humans or anything else, those whom God has called into communion with himself will continue in faith until the end. Those who apparently fall away either never had true faith to begin with or will return. The word "saints" is used to refer to all who are set apart by God, and not only those who are exceptionally holy, canonized, or in heaven).

=== Arminianism ===
Arminian soteriology, embraced by some denominations, such as the General Baptists and the Methodist movement, is rooted in the theological ideas of the Dutch Reformed theologian Jacobus Arminius (1560–1609). Like Calvinists, Arminians agree that all people are born sinful and are in need of salvation. Classical Arminians emphasize that God's free grace (or prevenient grace) enables humans to freely respond to or to reject the salvation offered through Christ. Classical Arminians believe that a person's saving relationship with Christ is conditional upon faith, and thus, a person can sever his or her saving relationship with Christ through persistent unbelief. The relationship of "the believer to Christ is never a static relationship existing as the irrevocable consequence of a past decision, act, or experience." (Note: Shank 1989, p. 116 cf. Williams 1996, pp. 127, 134–135, Volume 2. Colijn 2010, pp. 140–141 writes: "Salvation is not a transaction but an ongoing relationship between the Rescuer and the rescued, between the Healer and the healed. The best way to ensure faithfulness is to nurture that relationship. Final salvation, like initial salvation, is appropriated by grace through faith(fulness) (Ephesians 2:8–10; 1 Peter 1:5)... Salvation is not a one-time event completed at conversion. It involves a growth in relationship ... that is not optional or secondary but is essential to what salvation means")

The Five Articles of Remonstrance that Arminius's followers formulated in 1610 state the beliefs regarding (I) conditional election, (II) unlimited atonement, (III) total depravity, (IV) total depravity and resistible grace, and (V) possibility of apostasy. However, the fifth article did not completely deny the perseverance of the saints; Arminius said that "I never taught that a true believer can… fall away from the faith… yet I will not conceal, that there are passages of Scripture which seem to me to wear this aspect; and those answers to them which I have been permitted to see, are not of such a kind as to approve themselves on all points to my understanding." Further, the text of the Articles of Remonstrance says that no believer can be plucked from Christ's hand, and the matter of falling away, "loss of salvation", required further study before it could be taught with any certainty.

==== Methodism ====
Methodism falls squarely in the tradition of substitutionary atonement, though it is linked with Christus Victor and moral influence theories. Methodism also emphasizes a participatory nature in atonement, in which the Methodist believer spiritually dies with Christ as He dies for humanity.

Methodism affirms the doctrine of justification by faith, but in Wesleyan theology, justification refers to "pardon, the forgiveness of sins", rather than "being made actually just and righteous", which Methodists believe is accomplished through sanctification. (Note: Elwell 2001, p. 1268 states: "This balance is most evident in Wesley's understanding of faith and works, justification and sanctification [...] Wesley himself in a sermon entitled "Justification by Faith" makes an attempt to define the term accurately. First, he states what justification is not. It is not being made actually just and righteous (that is sanctification). It is not being cleared of the accusations of Satan, nor of the law, nor even of God. We have sinned, so the accusation stands. Justification implies pardon, the forgiveness of sins. ... Ultimately for the true Wesleyan salvation is completed by our return to original righteousness. This is done by the work of the Holy Spirit. ... The Wesleyan tradition insists that grace is not contrasted with law but with the works of the law. Wesleyans remind us that Jesus came to fulfill, not destroy the law. God made us in his perfect image, and he wants that image restored. He wants to return us to a full and perfect obedience through the process of sanctification [...] Good works follow after justification as its inevitable fruit. Wesley insisted that Methodists who did not fulfill all righteousness deserved the hottest place in the lake of fire) John Wesley, the founder of the Methodist Churches, taught that the keeping of the moral law contained in the Ten Commandments, as well as engaging in the works of piety and the works of mercy, were "indispensable for our sanctification".

Methodist soteriology emphasizes the importance of the pursuit of holiness in salvation and victoriously living over sin, a concept best summarized in a quote by Methodist evangelist Phoebe Palmer who stated that "justification would have ended with me had I refused to be holy." Thus, for Methodists, "true faith...cannot subsist without works".

While "faith is essential for a meaningful relationship with God, our relationship with God also takes shape through our care for people, the community, and creation itself." Methodism, inclusive of the holiness movement, thus teaches that "justification [is made] conditional on obedience and progress in sanctification", emphasizing "a deep reliance upon Christ not only in coming to faith, but in remaining in the faith."

=== Anabaptism ===
Anabaptist theology emphasizes a "faith that works"; Anabaptists teach that "justification [began] a dynamic process by which the believer partook of the nature of Christ and was so enabled to live increasingly like Jesus."

Anabaptist denominations such as the Mennonites teach:

...that we are saved by grace through faith. But we go on to say that true faith must lead to repentance and the beginning of a transformed life. Salvation has not become a full reality until our genuine faith expresses itself in a Christ-centered life. Mennonites tend to agree that salvation is not merely a personal relationship with God, but a communal relationship with each other. We experience salvation by living it out together.

Obedience to Jesus and a careful keeping of the Ten Commandments, in addition to loving one another and being at peace with others, are seen as "earmarks of the saved".

=== Pentecostalism ===
==== Holiness Pentecostalism ====
Holiness Pentecostalism maintains that God extends salvation through the New Birth and holds that "If a person walks within the framework of God’s Word, he will be kept by the power of God." Those who experience the New Birth should seek for the second work of grace, entire sanctification.

==== Oneness Pentecostalism ====
Oneness Pentecostals believe that salvation is attained through faith in Jesus Christ. According to their theology, this saving faith is more than just mental assent, intellectual acceptance, or verbal profession, but must include obedience, demonstrated by repentance, water baptism in Jesus's name, and the baptism of the Holy Spirit with the evidence of speaking in tongues.

=== Stone–Campbellism ===
==== Churches of Christ ====
Churches of Christ are strongly anti-Calvinist in their understanding of salvation, and generally present conversion as "obedience to the proclaimed facts of the gospel rather than as the result of an emotional, Spirit-initiated conversion." Some churches of Christ hold the view that humans of accountable age are lost because of their sins. These lost souls can be redeemed because Jesus Christ, the Son of God, offered himself as the atoning sacrifice. Children too young to understand right from wrong, and make a conscious choice between the two, are believed to be innocent of sin. The age when this occurs is generally believed to be around 13.

Beginning in the 1960s, many preachers began placing more emphasis on the role of grace in salvation, instead of focusing exclusively implementing all of the New Testament commands and examples.

The Churches of Christ argue that since faith and repentance are necessary, and that the cleansing of sins is by the blood of Christ through the grace of God, baptism is not an inherently redeeming ritual. One author describes the relationship between faith and baptism this way, "Faith is the reason why a person is a child of God; baptism is the time at which one is incorporated into Christ and so becomes a child of God" (italics are in the source). Baptism is understood as a confessional expression of faith and repentance, rather than a "work" that earns salvation.

=== Free Grace Theology ===
There are some who believe in the Free Grace Theology. They believe people use their free will to receive imputed righteousness and eternal life in Heaven, through faith alone in Jesus. Once saved, the individual will always be saved as they believe God promised them eternal life the moment they believe on Him. They do not believe that people are saved by good works, nor do they teach good works would automatically follow salvation as any kind of evidence. After salvation, a Christian is instructed to preach the gospel of Jesus Christ to the lost and live a good life as a good testimony for Jesus Christ and to please God the Father. The belief here is that doing good works will earn a believer Heavenly treasures and Earthly blessings, whereas committing sins and bad works will cause earthly punishments from God, chastisement from a loving Father, towards his children in the faith. In this framework, salvation cannot be revoked

== Universalism ==
Christian universalism is the doctrine or belief that all people will ultimately be reconciled to God. The appeal of the idea of universal salvation may be related to the perception of a problem of Hell, standing opposed to ideas such as endless conscious torment in Hell, but may also include a period of finite punishment similar to a state of purgatory. Believers in universal reconciliation may support the view that while there may be a real "Hell" of some kind, it is neither a place of endless suffering nor a place where the spirits of human beings are ultimately 'annihilated' after enduring the just amount of divine retribution.

== Restorationism ==
=== The New Church (Swedenborgian) ===
According to the doctrine of The New Church, as explained by Emanuel Swedenborg (1688–1772), there is no such thing as substitutionary atonement as is generally understood. Swedenborg's account of atonement has much in common with the Christus Victor doctrine, which refers to a Christian understanding of the Atonement which views Christ's death as the means by which the powers of evil, which held humanity under their dominion, were defeated. It is a model of the atonement that is dated to the Church Fathers, and it, along with the related ransom theory, was the dominant theory of the atonement for a thousand years.

=== Jehovah's Witnesses ===
According to Jehovah's Witnesses, atonement for sins comes only through the life, ministry, and death of Jesus Christ. They believe Jesus was the "second Adam", being the pre-existent and sinless Son of God who became the human Messiah of Israel, and that he came to undo Adamic sin. (Note: ADAM – jw.org. Retrieved January 10, 2013.)

Witnesses believe that the sentence of death given to Adam and subsequently his offspring by God required an equal substitute or ransom sacrifice of a perfect man. They believe that salvation is possible only through Jesus's ransom sacrifice, and that individuals cannot be reconciled to God until they repent of their sins, and then call on the name of God through Jesus. Salvation is described as a free gift from God, but is said to be unattainable without obedience to Christ as King and good works, such as baptism, confession of sins, evangelizing, and promoting God's Kingdom, that are prompted by faith. According to their teaching, the works prove faith is genuine. "Preaching the good news" is said to be one of the works necessary for salvation, both of those who preach and those to whom they preach. They believe that people in the "last days" can be "saved" by identifying Jehovah's Witnesses as God's theocratic organization, and by serving God as a part of it.

=== The Church of Jesus Christ of Latter-day Saints ===
The Church of Jesus Christ of Latter-day Saints teaches that the atonement of Jesus Christ is infinite and the central principle that enables the "plan of redemption" which is often also called the "plan of salvation". In the Book of Mormon the prophet Amulek teaches that the "great and last sacrifice will be the Son of God, yea, infinite and eternal. And thus he shall bring salvation to all those who shall believe on his name" There are two parts of salvation, conditional and unconditional. Unconditional salvation means that the atonement of Jesus Christ redeems all humanity from the chains of death and they are resurrected to their perfect frames. Conditional salvation of the righteous comes by grace coupled with strict obedience to Gospel principles, in which those who have upheld the highest standards and are committed to the covenants and ordinances of God, will inherit the highest heaven. There is no need for infant baptism. Christ's atonement completely resolved the consequence from the fall of Adam of spiritual death for infants, young children and those of innocent mental capacity who die before an age of self-accountability, hence all these are resurrected to eternal life in the resurrection. However, baptism is required of those who are deemed by God to be accountable for their actions (Moroni 8:10–22)

== See also ==
- Absolution
- Soteriology
- Epistemology
- Ecclesiology
- Eternal life (Christianity)
