= Elsie Wallace =

American minister (1868–1946)

Elsie May Marble Wallace (1868 – 1946) was an American Wesleyan minister.

In 1897, Wallace founded a holiness mission in Spokane, Washington. In 1902, the mission became a church, part of the Church of the Nazarene, and Wallace became the first pastor, ordained by Phineus Bresee. The church today is Spokane First Nazarene Church.

Wallace also started churches in Ashland, Oregon; Boise, Idaho, Walla Walla, Washington and Seattle, Washington. She became district superintendent, the first woman to hold that post, and the last until 1988.
