= Samuel F. Upham =

The Reverend Samuel Foster Upham, (19 May 1834, Duxbury, Massachusetts -5 October 1904) A.B., A.M., D.D., LL.D., was professor and Chair of Practical Theology at Drew Theological Seminary, now Drew University in Madison, New Jersey from 1881 until his death in 1904. Besides his academic training, he arrived with 25 years of experience preaching in New England and New York. He was known as a skilled orator and a person of great humor.

== Family ==
His father was Rev. Frederick Upham (1799-1891) who introduced Methodism to Plymouth, Massachusetts. Samuel Upham and his wife Lucy Graves née Smith(1832-1911) had three sons, Frederick N. Upham, Francis B. Upham and Walter H. Upham, who also became preachers.

== Religious career ==
He joined the Methodist Episcopal church at the age of 11. He graduated Wesleyan University in 1856. He joined the Methodist ministry in the New England Southern Conference when he was 23. He served the Conference in many roles in addition to serving local congregations, including serving as secretary of the commission which produced a new church constitution, and serving on the body which created a new hymnal. He was influential in removing time limits as to how long a pastor could serve one congregation. He received an honorary Doctor of Laws degree from Hamline University in 1889.

== Death ==
In 1904 when Upham lay dying and unresponsive in his bedroom at his home in Madison, New Jersey, surrounded by his friends, a physician wanted to determine if he was still alive. The physician said he would feel of Upham's feet to see if they were still warm, and commented "No, he is not dead. His feet are warm, and no man ever died with warm feet." At this, Upham rallied and said in a weak voice, "Jan Huss did." Jan Hus was a Czech Christian reformer who had been burned at the stake on accusations of heresy in 1415. Upham's deathbed humor has been widely quoted since in sermons, although sometimes the name in the anecdote is changed to Joan of Arc as a more familiar person burned at the stake.
