= John C. Bowling =

American academic administrator

John C. Bowling is the former president of Olivet Nazarene University (ONU). John C. Bowling was the president of Olivet Nazarene University from 1991 to 2021. His tenure as president ended at the end of the 2020–2021 school year. His 30-year tenure makes him the longest serving president in Olivet's history.

Before accepting the position in August 1991, Dr. Bowling served for eight years as the senior pastor of the College Church of the Nazarene in Bourbonnais, Illinois. He also served as senior pastor of the First Church of the Nazarene, Dallas, Texas. He has been a member of the faculty at Nazarene Bible College in Colorado Springs, Colorado, and at Olivet Nazarene University.

Bowling holds a bachelor's degree and a master's degree from Olivet, a second master's degree, a doctorate in education from Southwestern Baptist Theological Seminary and was chosen as a Resident Fellow for post-doctoral studies at Harvard University. In addition, he was honored by Olivet with the conferral of the Doctor of Divinity degree as part of their centennial celebration.

In addition to his work at Olivet, Bowling is active with professional organizations and local community affairs, including membership on the Board of People's Bank in Kankakee.

Dr. Bowling is a former member of the Board of Directors of the Nazarene Publishing House in Kansas City, Missouri, and of the Church of the Nazarene Foundation. He is a member of the USA/Canada Council of Education and the International Board of Education for the Church of the Nazarene.

In addition to over 60 published articles, he has authored four books: A Way With Words, Grace-full Leadership, Packin' Up and Headin' Out: Making the Most of Your College Adventure and, most recently, Making the Climb, which chronicles his ascent to the summit of Mount Kilimanjaro.

== General Superintendency of the Nazarene Church ==
In 2005, Bowling was elected as a general superintendent of the Church of the Nazarene but declined the office, saying that his mission at Olivet Nazarene University was not complete. In 2009, Bowling was again elected to serve as a general superintendent. He accepted, but rescinded his acceptance the next day.

== Published works ==
- A Way With Words (ISBN 0-8341-1802-5)
- Grace-full Leadership (ISBN 0-8341-1775-4)
- Packin' Up and Headin' Out: Making the Most of Your College Adventure (ISBN 0-8341-1899-8), co-authored with wife, Jill
- Making the Climb (ISBN 0-8341-2326-6) about climbing Mount Kilimanjaro
- ReVision: 13 Strategies to Renew Your Work, Your Organization, & Your Life (ISBN 0-8341-2943-4)
- Above All Else: 20 Years of Baccalaureate Sermons (ISBN 0-8341-2841-1)
