= Catholic hamartiology =

Branch of Catholic thought that studies sin

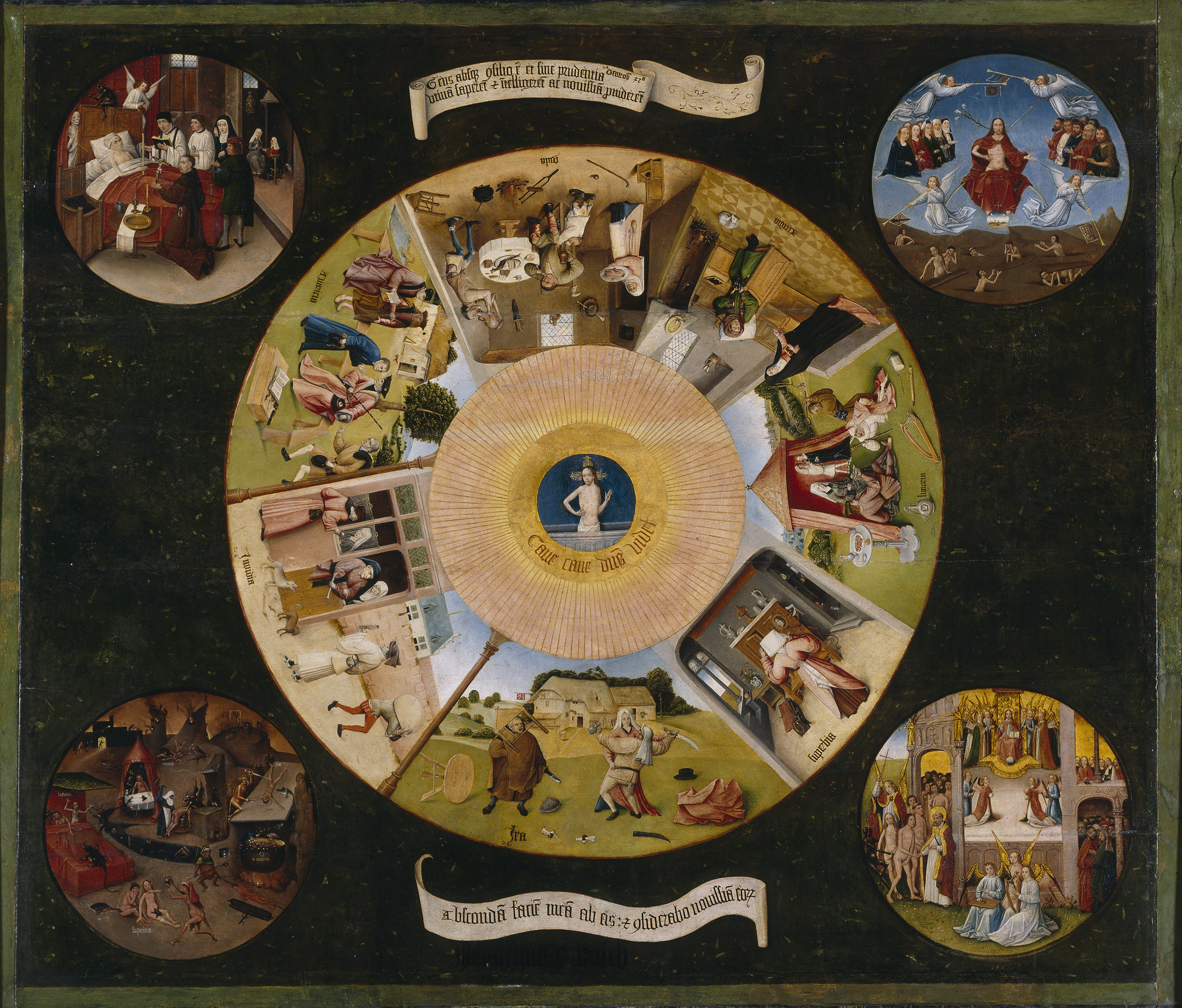
Hieronymus Bosch's The Seven Deadly Sins and the Four Last Things

Catholic hamartiology is a branch of Catholic thought that studies sin. According to the Catholic Church, sin is an "utterance, deed, or desire", caused by concupiscence, that offends God, reason, truth, and conscience. The church believes sin is the greatest evil and has the worst consequences for the sinner (original sin and damnation), the world (human misery and environmental destruction), and the Catholic Church itself (Passion of Jesus and wounds to the church's unity). Based on the Bible, the Catholic Church distinguishes between two kinds of sins: mortal sin and venial sin. The Catholic Church also distinguishes between the state of being in original sin and the commission of actual sin.

== Official teaching ==
The Catechism of the Catholic Church details most aspects of the church's official teaching on sin and forgiveness.

=== Reality of sin ===
The reality of sin is one of the arguments of divine revelation, e.g., sin is present in history and divine revelation sheds light on it.

==== Nature of sin ====
Sin is an "utterance, deed, or desire" that offends God, reason, truth, and conscience. It is caused by concupiscence. Sin is the greatest evil and has the worst consequences for the sinner, the world, and the church.

===== Misunderstanding of sin =====
Without divine revelation, sin can be misconstrued as "a developmental flaw, a psychological weakness, a mistake, or the necessary consequence of an inadequate social structure, etc."

===== The call to reject sin =====
The church's baptismal liturgy asks members to affirm that they "reject sin, so as to live in the freedom of the children of God". The Second Vatican Council noted that during Lent,

As regards instruction it is important to impress on the minds of the faithful not only a social consequences of sin but also that essence of the virtue of penance which leads to the detestation of sin as an offence against God; the role of the Church in penitential practices is not to be passed over, and the people must be exhorted to pray for sinners.

==== God permits, but does not will, evil ====
God, in his goodness, only wills good. He permits evil for the sake of a greater good. This is evidenced by the Paschal mystery: God permitted his Son to suffer and die for the sake of mankind's redemption.

=== Who can sin? ===
Angels and humans are capable of committing sin because, unlike every other creature, they have free-will. However, children who have not reached the Age of Reason are not accountable for their sins. A mental illness may also prevent a sinner from having full knowledge and consent, thus reducing or eliminating culpability.

==== No double predestination ====
No creature is predestined to commit sin or go to hell.

==== Fall of angels and humans ====
The angels and first humans underwent a test of love of God at the beginning of time; some angels sinned and became demons, then tempted the first humans to sin as well.

==== Creation of hell ====
By falling from heaven, demons gave rise to the existence of hell.

==== Demons are tempters ====
Out of envy, demons tempt humans to commit sin.

==== All sinners are to blame for the Passion of Jesus ====
Every human who sins is an author and minister of the Passion of Jesus.

=== Reign of sin ===
The reign or regime of sin in the world is not arbitrary or a conspiracy; rather, it is each person's struggle against his or her own concupiscence.

==== Disorder of sin ====
The regime of sin causes disorder, which can be "more or less overcome according to the circumstances of cultures, eras, and individuals".

==== Defeat of and end to sin ====
Sin's reign is temporary, beginning with the fall of the angels and ending in definitive defeat with the crucifixion of Jesus. Every human can share in Jesus' eternal reign on the wood of the cross via the sacraments. At the end of the world, sin will no longer exist nor be possible ever again, because Jesus' eternal reign will then be absolute: he will be everything to everyone, i.e., fulfill everyone's every desire.

=== Actual sin ===
Actual sin is the commitment of a sin. The first actual sin in history caused humanity to lose the state of original holiness, which included sanctifying grace.

==== State of original sin ====
After the fall, every human—apart from the Immaculate Conception—is now conceived in the state of original sin.

==== Kinds of actual sin ====
There are two types of actual sin: mortal and venial.

===== Mortal sin =====
Mortal sin is a deliberate sin of grave matter, such as murder.

====== Eternal punishment ======
Mortal sin entails eternal punishment since it destroys sanctifying grace.

====== Grave matter according to the Decalogue ======
The church does not have a full list of every possible sin. However, the Catechism of the Catholic Church does list certain offenses against the Ten Commandments that constitute grave matter. They include:

- 1st Commandment: superstition, idolatry, polytheism, divination, magic or sorcery, irreligion, atheism, tempting God, sacrilege, simony, heresy, schism, apostasy.
- 2nd Commandment: abuse of God's name, magical use of God's name, committing sin or crime in the name of God, blasphemy, false promises, false oaths, perjury, insult.
- 3rd Commandment: skipping Mass without grave reason (sickness, giving birth, etc.), impeding the worship of God, hindering the observation of Sunday, unnecessary demands.
- 4th Commandment: the state of refusing to assist and protect the family, violation of human rights, disobedience to parents or authority, ingratitude to the church, refusal to disobey evil, negligence of children.
- 5th Commandment: deliberate destruction of human life, deliberate killing of the innocent, capital punishment, intentional homicide, direct abortion, direct euthanasia, suicide, scandal, cult of the body, every kind of excess (drug abuse, overeating, etc.), inhumane scientific experiments, inhumane research, kidnapping, hostage taking, terrorism, torture, non-therapeutic and medical sterilization, non-therapeutic and medical amputation, non-therapeutic and medical mutilation, disrespect to the dead, unjust war, war crimes, unregulated production or sale of arms, arms race, economic or social inequality.
- 6th Commandment: lust, masturbation, fornication, pornography, prostitution, rape, sodomy, homosexual acts, marital infidelity, domestic violence, artificial conception, adultery, divorce, polygamy, incest, child abuse, free union, concubinage, cohabitation, trial marriage.
- 7th Commandment: theft, fraud, unjust wages, deliberate retention of lent goods, deliberate retention of lost objects, forcing up prices, unjust contracts, violation of a just contract, refusal to make reparations for injustice, unfair gambling, slavery, disrespect to animals, disrespect to environment, rich nations refusing to help the less fortunate, lay faithful refusing to directly intervene in politics, refusal to aid the poor or needy, human misery (material deprivation, unjust oppression, etc.)
- 8th Commandment: lying, rash judgment, detraction, calumny, satirical caricature, participation in sin, bragging or boasting, violation of professional secrets, violation of the sacramental seal, violation of privacy, iconoclasm.
- 9th Commandment: evil intentions, complicity in impure thoughts, immodesty, moral permissiveness.
- 10th Commandment: greed, envy, desire to amass goods without limit, desire to acquire someone else's property through unjust means, refusal to practice charity.

====== Sins that cry to heaven for justice ======
There are five mortal sins that cry to heaven for justice: the blood of Abel, the sin of the Sodomites, the cry of the Jews oppressed in Egypt, injustice to the wage earner, and the cry of the foreigner, widow, and orphan.

====== Diminishment of guilt ======
Feelings, passions, pathological desires (such as the psychological wounds of child abuse), or external pressures (such as the threat of death) can diminish the voluntary and free character of a mortal sin. Unintentional ignorance, such as not knowing the gospel, can diminish or even remove the imputability of a mortal sin.

====== Gravest of sins ======
Sins committing through malice—or deliberate choice of evil—is the gravest.

====== Unforgivable sin ======
The eternal sin—blasphemy against the Holy Spirit—is the mortal sin of final impenitence, e.g., dying unrepentant, which cannot be forgiven precisely because the sinner refuses to accept forgiveness.

===== Venial Sin =====
Venial sin is a deliberate sin of non-grave matter, such as a white lie, or an accidental sin of grave matter, such as an accidental killing.

====== Temporary punishment ======
Venial sin entails temporary punishment since it weakens the theological virtue of charity.

=== Habitual sin ===
A vice is when one is in the habit of committing sin. While it does not deprive someone of sanctifying grace, friendship with God, charity, and eternal happiness, it still opposes virtue.

==== Seven capital vices ====
There are seven capital vices, commonly mistakenly referred to as the seven deadly sins. They are called "capital vices" because these vices engender sin: pride, avarice, envy, wrath, lust, gluttony, and acedia.

=== Discrimination ===
The catechism condemns "[e]very form of social or cultural discrimination in fundamental personal rights on the grounds of sex, race, color, social conditions, language, or religion". Note that the church does not see its inability to ordain women as a discrimination on the grounds of sex, since Jesus himself only ordained men, and since there is no right to holy orders.

=== Sins of the church ===
Pope John Paul II made many apologies for the church's sins—including against women, Jews, victims of the Inquisition, and Muslims—throughout its history. Pope Benedict XVI apologized for the clerical sex abuse scandal.

=== Participation in sin ===
Participating in another's sin is grave matter according to the Eighth Commandment. One participates in sin by flattery, adulation, or complaisance; by taking part in the sin; by ordering, advising, or approving of sin; by not disclosing or hindering sin; or by protecting evildoers.

=== Forgiveness of sin ===
Only God forgives sins because forgiving sins is the height of omnipotence and forgiveness is the greatest of God's deeds.

==== Everyone can be forgiven ====
God is not bound by space or time or the church, so those who have no access to the sacraments can still receive divine mercy.

==== Repentance ====
The only prerequisite for forgiveness is contrition, (also called repentance) however this does not include original sin. While necessary for forgiveness, repentance is nonetheless impossible after death.

==== Sacraments ====
The sacrament of baptism forgives all sins and original sin and grants sanctifying grace, the sacrament of confession forgives all sins and restores sanctifying grace, and the sacrament of the Eucharist forgives all venial sins and augments sanctifying grace.

The church treats the season of Lent as a particular period in the liturgical year when its members and catechumens recall or prepare for their baptism and do penance, before the Easter celebration of the paschal mystery.

==== Repentance outside confession ====
Perfect contrition outside confession grants forgiveness of all sins, so long as one resolves to go to confession as soon as possible—or would have, had one not been ignorant of Jesus and his church.

===== God listens to the contrite =====
God hears the prayers of and is close to the contrite, and the church holds sinners to her bosom.

==== Indulgences ====
While the souls of Purgatory are undergoing temporary punishment for their sins, Catholics can remit their punishment by obtaining indulgences for them.

=== Impeccability ===
Impeccability - to be holy or sinless - is an attribute of God, since God is absolutely perfect. Impeccability is partially shared in by Christians, because they partake of God's nature, and completely shared in by the angels and saints, because they experience the beatific vision.

== Heretical beliefs ==
These beliefs have been condemned by the Catholic Church as heresies:

=== Good and evil are equal and matter is evil ===
Manichaeism is the belief that good and evil are equal forces and that matter is evil.

=== Sinners do not belong to the church ===
Donatism is the belief that sinners should not be reconciled to the church, since only saints belong to the church.

=== Christians are free from all authority ===
Messalians believe that Christians can do whatever they want.

=== Divine grace unnecessary for choosing good over evil ===
Pelagianism is the belief that humans can choose good over evil without divine grace.

=== Imperfect contrition is ineffective ===
Jansenism is the belief that imperfect contrition is insufficient for a Christian receiving the Eucharist.

== Unofficial teachings ==
=== Damnation of Judas Iscariot ===
It is commonly believed that Judas Iscariot, who betrayed Jesus before repenting of betrayal and committing suicide, is in hell, since the Bible calls him a "son of perdition." Regarding Judas' suicide, Pope Benedict XVI taught that "it is not up to us to judge his gesture, substituting ourselves for the infinitely merciful and just God."

=== Seven capital virtues ===
The seven capital virtues are virtues that are said to oppose the seven capital vices. They include: humility, charity, kindness, patience, chastity, temperance, and diligence.
