= Eastern Orthodox view of sin =

The Eastern Orthodox Church presents an integrated view of sin that is simultaneously forensic and therapeutic: sin is defined formally as the transgression of God's law and will, which incurs into real guilt and condemnation (reatus culpæ poenæ), while also operating as a debilitating spiritual illness and corruption of human nature. This condition darkens the intellect, weakens the will, and obscures the Image of God inherent in humanity, while causing the loss of the divine likeness, ultimately disorienting the soul and separating man from his true vocation of deification (theosis) in communion with God.

== Overview ==
In this soteriological framework, the Holy Mysteries (Sacraments) are understood as divinely instituted channels of sanctifying grace for the fallen human condition. Through them, Christ is believed to forgive guilt (reatus), heal the wounds of human nature, and incorporate the believer into the Church. Hence, participation in the sacramental life is seen as the ordinary means by which the believer is progressively restored to communion with the Holy Trinity.

== Types of sin ==
The Eastern Orthodox church, officially classifies sin in two kinds, that is, venial sin and mortal sin, very similar to Roman Catholicism. This is explained by several different authors, such as Archbishop George (Konissky) of Mogilev, as:

For some sins are greater, others less; some venial, which deprive not of the grace of the Spirit, (cf. 1 Jn. 1:8; Rm. 8:1) others deadly (Rm. 8:13; 1 Co. 6:9-10; Gal. 5:19-21). To the first class belong such as are committed ignorantly and involuntarily; to the other such as are done willingly, knowingly; and of set purpose, and as it were with a high hand against God (cf. Numb. 15:30); which, if they be not eradicated by true repentance, but left from day to day to go on increasing, grow up at length into that fearful sin against the Holy Ghost, which is unpardonable both in this world, and in the world to come (cf. Mt. 12:31-32; Heb. 6:4, 10:26, 29; 1 Jn. 6:16).

== Ancestral or Original sin ==
According to the Neo-Patristic Synthesis, the Eastern Orthodox church accepts the teachings of John Cassian and the doctrine of ancestral sin, but not original guilt. Ancestral sin (Greek: προγονικὸν ἁμάρτημα, romanized: progonikon hamartēma, lit. 'ancestral fault') is distinguished from the Western formulation of original sin. Humanity is understood to inherit the consequences of the primordial transgression, namely mortality, corruption, and inclination to sin, instead of guilt based on the actions of Adam. The fall introduces a condition in which human beings are born into a disordered and corruptible existence, without bearing personal culpability for the first sin.

Sources and modern scholarship describe ancestral sin in ontological rather than juridical terms. In Greek patristic tradition, sin is primarily compiled as a state of corruption and separation from God, instead of it being inherited as legal guilt.

Regardless of these views, the historical stance of the Eastern Orthodox Church is held in the Confession of Faith of Peter (Mogila), Metropolitan of Kiev, approved by the Synod of Jassy, wherein it is stated that both Original sin and guilt are acceptable positions:

Question 20. What is Original Sin?

Answer.

Original Sin is the Transgression of that Law of God which was given to Adam, the Father of all Men... This original Sin spreadeth over all human Nature; forasmuch as we were all then contained in Adam. Wherefore by one Adam Sin hath passed into us all. And we are conceived and born with this Blemish, as the Scripture teacheth us (Rom. v. 12), By one Man Sin entered into the World, and Death by Sin; and so Death passed upon all Men, for that all have sinned. This hereditary Sin cannot be rooted out or abolished by any Repentance whatever, but only by the Grace of God, through the Work of Redemption, wrought by our Lord Jesus Christ, in taking upon him our Flesh and pouring out his precious Blood. And this is done in the Mystery of holy Baptism; and whosoever is not a Partaker thereof, such an one remains unabsolved from his Sin, and continueth in his Guilt, and is liable to the eternal Punishment of the divine Wrath: As it is said (John iii. 5), Verily, verily, I say unto you, that except a Man be horn of Water, and of the Spirit, he cannot enter into the Kingdom of Heaven.

== Original guilt ==
According to the Neo-Patristic Synthesis, Orthodox doctrine doesn't affirm original guilt. The Orthodox Church, according to them, affirms the understanding that humanity inherits sin's consequences and a fallen environment, but explicitly denies inherited guilt or a fallen nature. Kallistos Ware writes that, while human beings inherit the fallen condition marked by morality and corruption, they don't inherit the guilt of Adam's transgression:

Orthodoxy, holding as it does a less exalted idea of the human state before the fall, is also less severe than the west in its view of the consequences of the fall.

John Meyendorff observes that the Greek Fathers didn't develop the concept of inherited guilt characteristic of later Western theology, instead describing the fall in terms of corruption and death affecting human nature. Furthermore, original sin isn't transmitted as personal culpability but as a condition into which each individual is born.

Putting aside the Neo-Patristic premises, one can indeed see Original guilt affirmed in some documents, such as the Catechism written by Metropolitan Panteleimon (Lampadarios) of Antinoes, officially approved by the Patriarchate of Alexandria in 2004:

Original Sin consists of true and real guilt, not only in the punishment imposed as a result of Adam's Offence... Original Sin is the heritage of a sinful condition for all mankind, which is imputed to us not as personal sin (direct imputation), but as the sinful condition of each person (“vitiositas”). Between Adam's guilt and the guilt of his descendants there “...exists a great difference: ...in Adam the Offence of God's Law was commited by his own will whereas in his descendants it is by inheritance and unavoidable.”

== Sexuality ==
The Eastern Orthodox Church does not hold that sex is inherently sinful, but rather condemns seeing sex as something which can be divorced from the loving act between a married couple.

=== Marriage ===
One of the Fathers of the Church, John Chrysostom, in elaborating on the words of Paul the Apostle and writing commentary on the First Epistle to the Corinthians 7 in his homilies, states that:

But 1 Corinthians 7:8 I say to the unmarried and to widows, it is good for them if they abide even as I: 1 Corinthians 7:9 but if they have not continency let them marry? Do you see the strong sense of Paul how he both signifies that continence is better, and yet puts no force on the person who cannot attain to it; fearing lest some offense arise?

=== Homosexuality ===
Despite varying views from different jurisdictions, the Orthodox Church has consistently condemned homosexuality, including notes from the early Church Fathers and Byzantine Empire. Today, they're mostly consistent in agreeing that homosexuality is damaging to the human person and that temptation is an ascetic struggle. Evidence from the New and Old Testament suggests how homosexuality is viewed as sinful, including Romans 1:26-27:

Because of this, God gave them over to shameful lusts. Even their women exchanged natural sexual relations for unnatural ones. In the same way the men also abandoned natural relations with women and were inflamed with lust for one another. Men committed shameful acts with other men, and received in themselves the due penalty for their error.

The Orthodox Church in America (OCA) also provides detailed advice on homosexuality in their 1992 10th All-American Council:

Men and women with homosexual feelings and emotions are to be treated with the understanding, acceptance, love, justice and mercy due to all human beings... Persons struggling with homosexuality who accept the Orthodox faith and strive to fulfill the Orthodox way of life may be communicants of the Church with everyone else who believes and struggles.

== Idolatry and iconoclasm ==
=== Idolatry ===
In Eastern Orthodox theology, idolatry is defined as the worship (λατρεία) of created objects as though they were divine. The tradition distinguishes this from the veneration (προσκύνησις) accorded to icons, which is directed not to the material object but to the prototype it presents. The Second Council of Nicaea in 787 AD formalized this distinction, affirming that "the honor paid to the image passes the prototype" and thereby rejecting the identification of icon veneration with idolatry.

Patristic and later sources interpret biblical prohibitions such as Exodus 20:4 ("You shall not make for yourself an image in the form of anything in heaven above or on the earth beneath or in the waters below") within the context of pagan idol worship instead of condemnation on sacred images. John of Damascus wrote that the Incarnation establishes the legitimacy of depicting Christ, since the invisible God has become visible in human form. Modern Orthodox scholarship maintains this distinction.

=== Iconoclasm ===
This refers to the rejection and destruction of religious images, particularly during the Byzantine Iconoclastic Controversy (c. 726 – c. 843). Imperial policies under Leo III and his successors prohibited the use of icons, leading to sustained theological and political conflict within the Byzantine Empire. The controversy culminated in the restoration of icons in 843, commemorated in the Orthodox Church as the Feast of Orthodoxy.

Theologically, iconoclasm was opposed because it compromised the doctrine of the Incarnation. Iconophile writers, including John of Damascus and Theodore the Studite, argued that the denial of icons implied a denial of Christ's true humanity and visibility. The Seventh Ecumenical Council condemned iconoclasm as a doctrinal error.
