= Actual sin =

According to Western Christianity, actual sin, as distinguished from original sin, is an act contrary to the will and law of God whether by doing evil (sin of commission) or refraining from doing good (sin of omission). It can be either "mortal" or "venial".

== Catholicism ==
=== Mortal sin ===
In Roman Catholic moral theology, a sin, considered to be more severe or mortal sin is distinct from a venial sin (somewhat similar to the secular common law distinction of classifying the severity of a crime as either a felony or a misdemeanor) and must meet all of the following conditions: Its subject must be a grave (or serious) matter. It must be committed with full knowledge, both of the sin and of the gravity of the offense (Article 1860 of The Catechism Of The Catholic Church specifies;) "Unintentional ignorance can diminish or even remove the imputability of a grave offense. But no one is deemed to be ignorant of the principles of the moral law, which are written in the conscience of every man. the promptings of feelings and passions can also diminish the voluntary and free character of the offense, as can external pressures or pathological disorders (mental illness). Sin committed through malice, by deliberate choice of evil, is the gravest." It must be committed with deliberate and complete consent, enough for it to have been a personal decision to commit the sin. (Article 1859 of The Catechism Of The Catholic Church specifies;) "Mortal sin requires full knowledge and complete consent. It presupposes knowledge of the sinful character of the act, of its opposition to God's law. It also implies a consent sufficiently deliberate to be a personal choice. Feigned ignorance and hardness of heart do not diminish, but rather increase, the voluntary character of a sin."

==== Venial sin ====
In Roman Catholic theology, venial sin will not cause loss of heaven in itself, but can eventually lead to the death of the soul by making the doer weaker to resisting mortal sin. Sin is made venial in two ways:

- The sin is not seriously wrong.
- The sin is seriously wrong, but the sinner honestly believes that it is only slightly wrong, or does not give full consent.

A venial sin weakens our power to resist mortal sin, and a venial sin makes us deserving of God’s punishments in this life or in purgatory.

==== Capital vices or the seven deadly sins ====
In Roman Catholic theology, the "Capital vices" or sins, also known as the "seven deadly sins", are the main roots of sin. They are called capital sins not because they are the greatest sins or necessarily mortal sins, but because all sins are in some way related to at least one of them. These sins are:

1. Lust
2. Gluttony
3. Greed
4. Sloth
5. Wrath
6. Envy
7. Pride

== Methodism ==
A prominent Methodist catechism, "A Catechism on the Christian Religion: The Doctrines of Christianity with Special Emphasis on Wesleyan Concepts" contrasts original sin and actual sin:

Original sin is the sin which corrupts our nature and gives us the tendency to sin. Actual sins are the sins we commit every day before we are saved, such as lying, swearing, stealing.

== See also ==
- Christian views on sin
- Hamartiology
- Original sin
- Catholic hamartiology
