= Act of Contrition =

Christian prayer

An Act of Contrition is a Christian prayer genre that expresses sorrow for sins. It may be used in a liturgical service or be used privately, especially in connection with an examination of conscience.

Special formulae for acts of contrition are in use in the Anglican, Catholic, Lutheran, Methodist and Reformed Churches.

== Catholic Church ==
The Catholic Church does not restrict the term act of contrition to any one formula. Its Handbook on Indulgences mentions as examples of approved formulae for an act of contrition the Confiteor, the Psalm De Profundis, the Psalm Miserere, the Gradual Psalms and the Penitential Psalms.

The Act of Contrition is part of the Sacrament of Penance and is prayed by the penitent after the priest assigns a penance and before he gives the penitent absolution. It is also customarily said especially before one goes to bed at night. It is generally supposed that individuals might have recourse to an Act of Contrition when they find themselves in extremis. Fulton Sheen recounts a story told of John Vianney. When a recent widow bemoaned the death of her husband who committed suicide by jumping off a bridge, Monsieur le Curé observed, "Remember, Madam, that there is a little distance between the bridge and the water." By this he meant that her husband had time to make an Act of Contrition. This is analogous to the well-known quote, "Between the stirrup and the ground, he something sought and something found", indicating that mercy is available when sought. (The original quote is from the sixteenth century English antiquarian William Camden; the more familiar version is from Graham Greene's 1938 novel Brighton Rock.)

The prayer expresses in words a deeply personal "act" that engages a person's affections and will.

=== A particular Latin formula and its English translations ===
Within the Catholic Church, the term "act of contrition" is often applied to one particular formula, which is not given expressly in the handbook of Indulgences.

The Catechism of the Catholic Church notes that "Among the penitent's acts, contrition occupies first place. Contrition is 'sorrow of the soul and detestation for the sin committed together with the resolution not to sin again.' When it arises from a love by which God is loved above all else, contrition is called 'perfect' (contrition of charity). Such contrition remits venial sins; it also obtains forgiveness of mortal sins if it includes the firm resolution to have recourse to sacramental confession as soon as possible" (CCC 1451–1452).

Catholic teaching holds that "imperfect" contrition, is also a gift of God. Born of fear of eternal damnation or other penalties, it is nonetheless sufficient to inspire a valid Act of Contrition.

There are different versions of the Act of Contrition, but all generally include an expression of sorrow, an acknowledgment of wrongdoing and a promise to amend one's life and avoid sin. The Latin text and a number of English versions that approximate to the Latin text are given here.

==== Latin text ====
===== Act of contrition of Pius X =====
Deus meus, ex toto corde pænitet me omnium meorum peccatorum,
eaque detestor, quia peccando,
non solum pœnas a te iuste statutas promeritus sum,
sed præsertim quia offendi te,
summum bonum, ac dignum qui super omnia diligaris.
Ideo firmiter propono,
adiuvante gratia tua,
de cetero me non peccaturum peccandique occasiones proximas fugiturum.
Amen.

===== Act of contrition of Paul VI =====
Deus meus, ex toto corde me pǽnitet ac dóleo de ómnibus quæ male egi et de bono quod omísi, quia peccándo offendi Te, summe bonum ac dignum qui super ómnia diligáris. Fírmiter propóno,
adiuvánte grátia tua,
me pæniténtiam ágere,
de cétero non peccatúrum peccantíque occasiónes fugitúrum.
Per mérita passiónis Salvatóris nostri Iesu Christi, Dómine, misérere.

==== Traditional version ====
O My God, I am heartily sorry for having offended Thee,
and I detest all my sins, because I dread the loss of heaven and the pains of hell,
but most of all because they offend Thee, my God, Who art all good and deserving of all my love.
I firmly resolve, with the help of Thy grace,
to confess my sins,
to do penance
and to amend my life. Amen.

==== A popular Catholic American English worldwide version ====
My God, I am sorry for my sins with all my heart.
In choosing to do wrong and failing to do good,
I have sinned against You whom I should love above all things,
I firmly intend, with Your help, to do penance, to sin no more, and to avoid whatever leads me to sin.
Our Savior Jesus Christ, suffered and died for us.
In His name, my God, have mercy. Amen.

==== A modern version taught in Religious Education ====
Lord have mercy on me
Do not look upon my sins
But take away all my guilt
Create in me a clean heart
And renew within me an upright spirit
Amen.

==== National versions ====
Irish version

O my God, I am heartily sorry for having offended Thee: and I detest my sins most sincerely because they displease Thee, my God, Who art so deserving of all my love for Thy infinite goodness and most amiable perfections: and I firmly purpose by Thy holy grace never more to offend Thee.

==== Other formulas for acts of contrition ====
Sacrosanctum concilium (the Constitution on the Sacred Liturgy) called for the revision of the Rite of Penance so that it more clearly express both the nature and effect of the sacrament. Consequently, the Rite of Penance was revised in 1973. The revised rite offered several possible options for making an Act of Contrition. One may choose one of the general formula prayers or other prayers of contrition.

The following are some formulas for acts of contrition that differ more considerably from the Latin text given above.

O my God I am heartily sorry for all my sins because of them I deserve the eternal pains of hell,
but most of all because I have offended Thee my God who art all good and deserving of all my love.
I firmly resolve with the help of Thy grace to confess my sins,
to do penance, to avoid the occasion of sin and never to sin again.
Amen.

O my God, I am sorry that I have sinned against you,
because you are so good,
and by the help of Your grace,
I will not sin again.
Amen.

O my God, because You are so good,
I am very sorry that I have sinned against You;
and by the help of Your grace, I will not sin again.
Amen.

I love You, Jesus, my Love above all things.
I repent with my whole heart for ever having offended You.
Never permit me to separate myself from You again.
Grant that I may love You always.
Then do with me what You will. - Alphonsus Liguori

== Protestantism ==
=== Anglican Communion ===
In the Church of England Reconciliation of a Penitent, the Act of Contrition "expresses the desire and intention before God to turn away from sin and walk in newness of life. The penitent may use his or her own words or the form provided." The Anglican Communion, which includes the Church of England, The Episcopal Church and other member churches, has its own act of contrition, referred to in the Prayer Book as the General Confession. This is said by the Congregation en masse during worship. The 1662 Book of Common Prayer contains two versions. The first (for use at Matins and Evensong) is:

ALMIGHTY and most merciful Father;
We have erred, and strayed from Thy ways like lost sheep.
We have followed too much the devices and desires of our own hearts.
We have offended against Thy holy laws.
We have left undone those things which we ought to have done;
And we have done those things which we ought not to have done;
And there is no health in us.
But Thou, O Lord, have mercy upon us, miserable offenders.
Spare thou them, O God, which confess their faults.
Restore thou them that are penitent; According to Thy promises declared unto mankind in Christ Jesus our Lord.
And grant, O most merciful Father, for His sake; That we may hereafter live a godly, righteous, and sober life, To the glory of Thy Holy Name. Amen.

The second (for use during Holy Communion) is:

ALMIGHTY God, Father of our Lord Jesus Christ,

Maker of all things, judge of all men;
We acknowledge and bewail our manifold sins and wickedness,
Which we, from time to time, most grievously have committed,
By thought, word, and deed,
Against thy Divine Majesty,
Provoking most justly Thy wrath and indignation against us.
We do earnestly repent,
And are heartily sorry for these our misdoings;
The remembrance of them is grievous unto us;
The burden of them is intolerable.
Have mercy upon us,
Have mercy upon us, most merciful Father;
For Thy Son our Lord Jesus Christ's sake,
Forgive us all that is past;
And grant that we may ever hereafter
Serve and please Thee in newness of life,
To the honour and glory of Thy Name;
Through Jesus Christ our Lord.

Amen.

Modernized forms can be found in other Anglican Prayer Books.

=== Lutheran formula ===
The Lutheran Church also has its own act of contrition, which is said during Holy Absolution. The following version, taken from the Lutheran Service Book (2006), says:

O Almighty God, merciful Father,
I a poor, miserable sinner, confess to You all my sins and iniquities,
with which I have ever offended You and justly deserved Your punishment now and forever.
But I am heartily sorry for them and sincerely repent of them,
and I pray You of Your boundless mercy,
and for the sake of the holy, innocent,
bitter sufferings and death of Your beloved son, Jesus Christ,
to be gracious and merciful to me, a poor sinful being.
