= Evil inclination =

The term evil inclination may refer to:

- Concupiscence, in Christian thought;
- Yetser hara, in Jewish thought.
