= Christian views on sin =

Viewpoints of sin according to the Bible

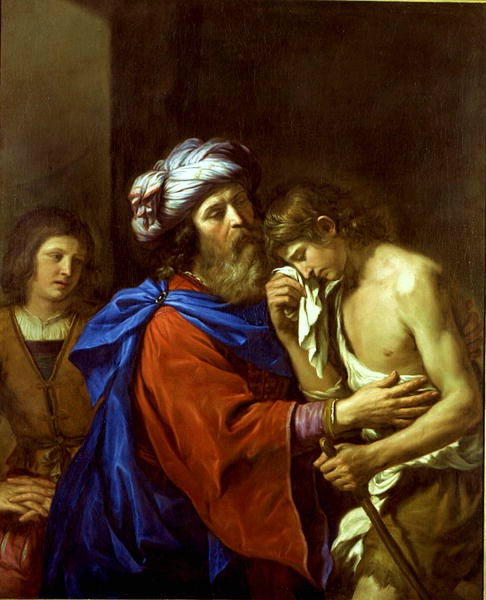
The Prodigal Son

In Christianity, sin is an immoral act and transgression of divine law. The doctrine of sin is central to the Christian faith, since its basic message is about redemption in Christ.

Hamartiology, a branch of Christian theology which is the study of sin, describes sin as an act of offence against God by despising his persons and Christian biblical law, and by injuring others. Christian hamartiology is closely related to concepts of natural law, moral theology and Christian ethics.

Among some scholars, sin is understood mostly as legal infraction or contract violation of non-binding philosophical frameworks and perspectives of Christian ethics, and so salvation tends to be viewed in legal terms. Other Christian scholars understand sin to be fundamentally relational—a loss of love for the Christian God and an elevation of self-love ("concupiscence", in this sense), as was later propounded by Augustine in his debate with the Pelagians. As with the legal definition of sin, this definition also affects the Christian understanding of grace and salvation, which are thus viewed in relational terms.

== Etymology ==
Hamartiology (from Greek: ἁμαρτία, hamartia, "a departure fr. either human or divine standards of uprightness" and -λογια, -logia, "study").

== In the Bible ==
=== Old Testament ===
The first use of sin as a noun in the Christian Greek Old Testament is in Genesis chapter 4, verse seven "sin is crouching at your door; it desires to have you, but you must rule over it" waiting to be mastered by Cain, a form of literary theriomorphism.

The Book of Isaiah announced the consequences of sin: "But your iniquities have separated you from your God; your sins have hidden his face from you, so that he will not hear. For your hands are stained with blood, your fingers with guilt. Your lips have spoken falsely, and your tongue mutters wicked things" — a separation between God and man, and unrequited worshipping.

==== Original sin ====
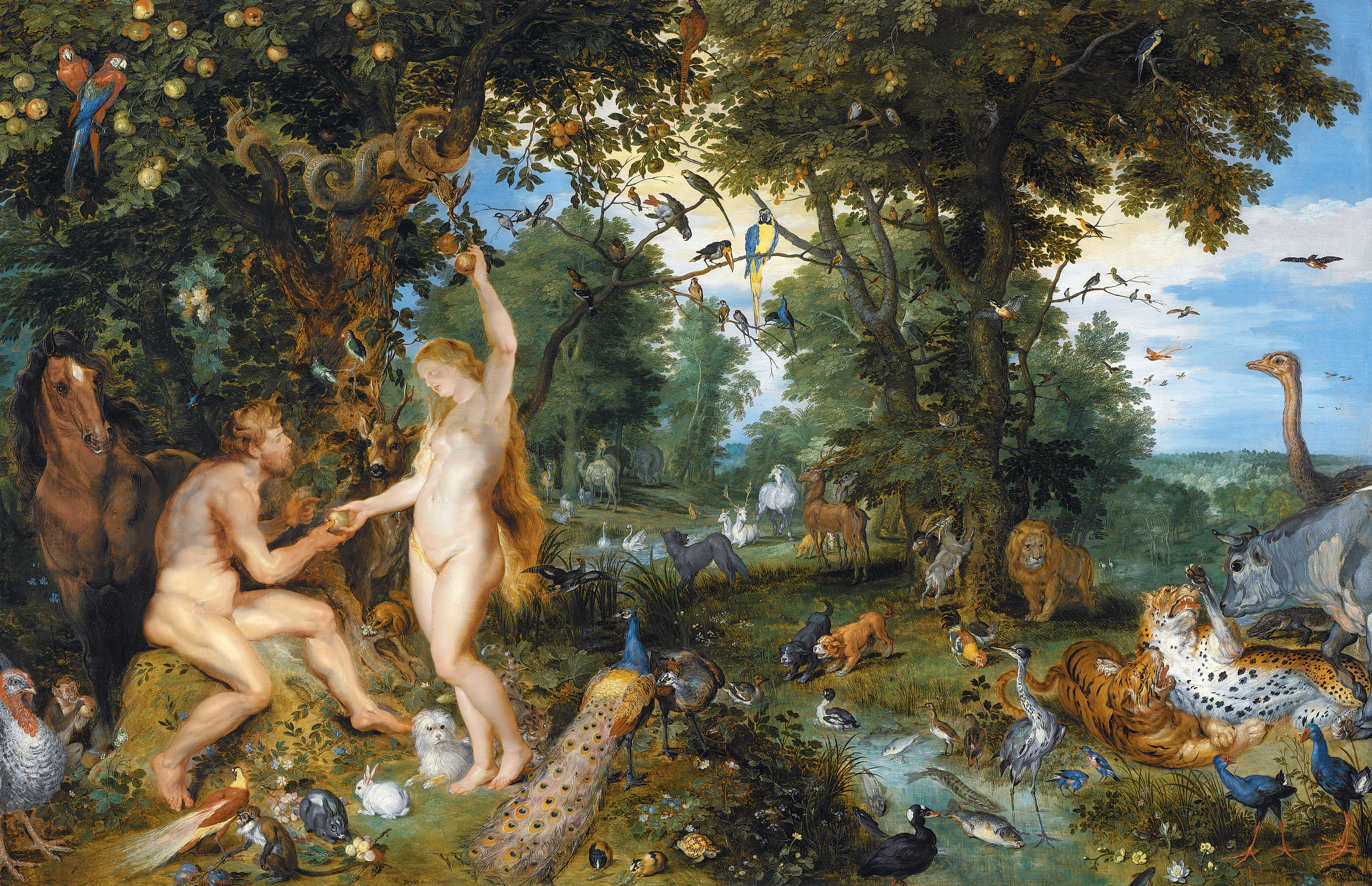
Depiction of the sin of Adam and Eve by Jan Brueghel the Elder and Pieter Paul Rubens

Original sin is the Christian doctrine that humans inherit a tainted nature and a proclivity to sin through the fact of birth. Theologians have characterized this condition in many ways, seeing it as ranging from something as insignificant as a slight deficiency, or a tendency toward sin yet without collective guilt, referred to as a "sin nature", to total depravity or automatic guilt of all humans through collective guilt.

Christians believe the doctrine of humanity's state of sin resulted from the fall of man, stemming from Adam's rebellion in Eden, namely the sin of disobedience in consuming from the tree of knowledge of good and evil.

The concept of original sin was first alluded to in the 2nd century by Irenaeus, in his controversy with certain dualist Gnostics. Other church fathers such as Augustine of Hippo also developed the doctrine, seeing it as based on the New Testament teaching of Paul the Apostle (Romans 5:12–21 and 1 Corinthians 15:22) and the Old Testament verse of Psalm 51:5. Tertullian, Cyprian, Ambrose and Ambrosiaster considered that humanity shares in Adam's sin, transmitted by human generation. Augustine's formulation of original sin was popular among Protestant reformers, such as Martin Luther and John Calvin, who equated original sin with concupiscence, affirming that it persisted even after baptism and completely destroyed freedom. The Jansenist movement, which the Catholic Church declared to be heretical, also maintained that original sin destroyed freedom of will.

Substantial branches of hamartiological understanding, including Catholic, Presbyterian, Continental Reformed, and Reformed Baptist subscribe to the doctrine of original sin, which they believe Paul espouses in Romans 5:12–19 and which Augustine of Hippo popularized in Western Christianity and developed into a notion of "hereditary sin". Augustine taught that God holds all the descendants of Adam and Eve accountable for Adam's sin of rebellion, and as such all people deserve God's wrath and condemnation – apart from any actual sins they personally commit.

In contrast, Pelagianism states that humans enter life as moral "blank slates" (tabulae rasae) responsible for their own moral nature. The Fall that occurred when Adam and Eve disobeyed God affected humankind only minimally as it established a negative moral precedent.

A third line of thinking takes an intermediate position, asserting that since the Fall the sin of Adam has naturally affected human beings such that they have inborn tendencies to rebel against God (in which rebellion by personal choice all accountable humans, except Jesus and, to Catholics, Mary, will choose or have chosen to indulge). This is the hamartiological position of the Eastern Christian churches, often called ancestral sin as opposed to original sin, but it is sometimes viewed as Semi-Pelagianism in the West, especially by the Reformed.

==== Generational sin ====
The Bible speaks of generational sin in Exodus 20:5, which states that "the iniquities of the fathers are visited upon the sons and daughters — unto the third and fourth generation." This concept implicates that "unresolved issues get handed down from generation to generation", but that "Jesus is the bondage breaker...[and] He is able to break the cycle of this curse, but only if we want Him to." Theologian Marilyn Hickey explicates this concept, teaching that 2 Thessalonians 2:7 references "the unseen and mysterious connection between a father's sins and the path of his children"; she provides an example in which if a "father is a liar and a thief, his children are prone to the same behavior". Hickey states that "Through the power of Jesus Christ, no generational curses need remain in our family lineage" and says that prayer is efficacious in ending the cycle of ancestral sin. James Owolagba adds that in addition to prayer, frequent church attendance including regular reception of the sacraments, especially Holy Communion, aids in delivering an individual from generation sin.

=== New Testament ===
Several Gospel narratives address the relationship between sin, suffering and physical illness. In the accounts of the healing of the paralytic (Mark 2:1–12; Matthew 9:1–8; Luke 5:17–26), Jesus first declares the man's sins forgiven and subsequently heals him, presenting the healing as a demonstration of his authority to forgive sins. In the Gospel of John, after healing a man who had been ill for thirty-eight years, Jesus tells him:

See, you are well again. Stop sinning or something worse may happen to you.

— Jesus, John 5:14 (NIV)

The passage has been discussed in relation to the possible connection between sin and sickness. However, in another episode in the same Gospel, when the disciples ask whether a man born blind had sinned, or whether his parents had sinned, Jesus answers that neither the man nor his parents were responsible for his condition (John 9:1–3).

The arrest of Jesus also contains a passage concerning the consequences of violent conduct. According to the Gospel of John, Simon Peter draws a sword and cuts off the right ear of Malchus, a servant of the high priest; Jesus orders Peter to put his sword away (John 18:10–11). Luke's account adds that Jesus touches and heals the injured man's ear (Luke 22:49–51). In Matthew, Jesus explains his rebuke with the statement: "all who draw the sword will die by the sword" (Matthew 26:52).

==== Sin and punishment ====
In the Epistle to the Galatians, Paul writes that "a man reaps what he sows", explaining that those who sow to the flesh will reap corruption, whereas those who sow to the Spirit will reap eternal life (Galatians 6:7–8). The metaphor expresses a relationship between conduct and its consequences, although its immediate context concerns Christian moral behaviour and the contrast between the flesh and the Spirit.

== Divisions ==
Within some branches of Christianity, there are several defined types of sin:

- Original sin—Most denominations of Christianity interpret the Garden of Eden account in Genesis in terms of the fall of man. Adam and Eve's disobedience was the first sin man ever committed, and their original sin (or the effects of the sin) is passed on to their descendants (or has become a part of their environment). See also: total depravity.
- Concupiscence
- Venial sin
- Mortal sin
- Seven deadly sins
- Eternal sin—Commonly called the Unforgivable sin (mentioned in Matthew 12:31), this is perhaps the most controversial sin, whereby someone has become an apostate, forever denying themselves a life of faith and experience of salvation; the precise nature of this sin is often disputed.

== Catholic views ==
=== Thomas Aquinas ===
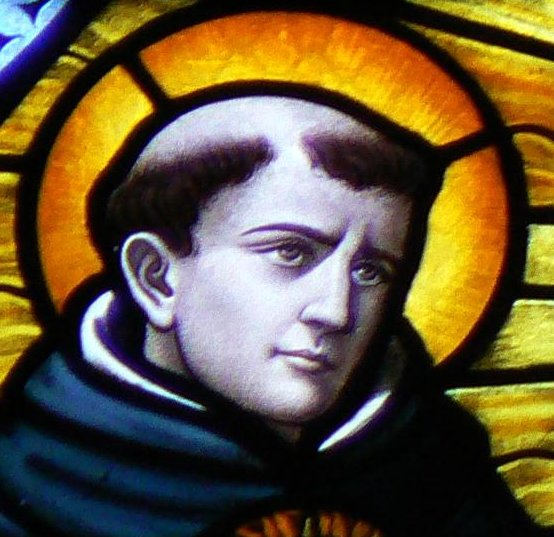
Aquinas distinguished between sins of omission, and sins of commission

The way Thomas Aquinas viewed sin and vices was radically different from later approaches, especially that of 17th-century moral theology. He presented sin and vices as contraries of virtues. He discusses the subject in his Summa Theologica part Ia–IIae (Prima secundae) qq. 71–89.

In one of his definitions of sin Thomas quotes Augustine of Hippo's description of sin as "a thought, words and deed against the Eternal Law."'

Now there are two rules of the human will: one is proximate and homogeneous, viz. the human reason; the other is the first rule, viz. the eternal law, which is God's reason, so to speak (quasi ratio Dei). Accordingly Augustine includes two things in the definition of sin; one, pertaining to the substance of a human act, and which is the matter, so to speak, of sin, when he says, word, deed, or desire; the other, pertaining to the nature of evil, and which is the form, as it were, of sin, when he says, contrary to the eternal law. (STh I–II q.71 a.6)

To recognise the possibilities of sin in man is equal to acknowledge his human nature, his control and mastery of his own actions. Sin is a motion to the goal, it is judged by the object to which it is directed. The field of sin is the same as the field of virtue. There are three major fields: relationship with God, with oneself and with the neighbour. Thomas distinguished between mortal and venial sins. Mortal sin is when a person has irreparably destroyed the very principle of his/her order to the goal of life. Venial sin is when he/she has acted in a certain disordered way without destructing that principle:

Consequently it is a mortal sin generically, whether it be contrary to the love of God, e.g. blasphemy, perjury, and the like, or against the love of one's neighbour, e.g. murder, adultery, and such like: wherefore such sins are mortal by reason of their genus. Sometimes, however, the sinner's will is directed to a thing containing a certain inordinateness, but which is not contrary to the love of God and one's neighbour, e.g. an idle word, excessive laughter, and so forth: and such sins are venial by reason of their genus. (STh I–II q.72 a.5)

According to Aquinas the gravity of sin depends also on "some disposition of the agent" (cf. STh I–II q. 18, aa. 4, 6). Sin, venial by reason of its object, may become mortal. It happens when person fixes his/her ultimate happiness, the last end of his/her life (Lat. finis ultimus) in the object of that venial sin. When venial sin is used as a way to provoke mortal sin it becomes mortal as well, e.g. when someone uses empty conversation or a chat to seduce someone to commit adultery. Also sin, mortal by reason of its object, may become venial because of the agent's disposition when his/her evil act does not have full moral capacity, i.e. is not deliberated by reason. That may happen for instance when sudden movements of unbelief arise in the mind. (Cf. STh I–II q.72 a.5).

The difference and gravity of sins may be discerned on the grounds of spirit and flesh, even mortal sins may differ in gravity. Carnal sins like lust, adultery or fornication, gluttony and avarice, because the person who commits them is inordinately directed towards material goods that are a serious matter, are mortal sins. They may cause much shame and infamy. But spiritual sins like blaspheming of God or apostasy are, according to Thomas, still greater evil, as they have more of the aversion from God. They are directed against a greater object. The formal, essential element of sin is more at the centre in them. (cf. STh I–II q.72 a.2)

According to another formulation of the concept of sin in the Summa, at the heart of sin is "the turning away from the immutable good", i.e. God, and "inordinate turning to mutable good", i.e. creatures. (STh I–IIae q.87 a.4) This cannot be understood as if in the concrete sinful deed the sinner commits two separate and independent acts. Both aversio and conversio constitute one single guilty action. At the root of the inordinate turning to the creatures is self-love which expresses itself in disordered desire (cupiditas) and rebellion towards God (superbia).

Speaking about sloth (Lat. acedia) Thomas points out that every deed which "by its very nature is contrary to charity is a mortal sin". An effect of such deed is the destruction of "spiritual life which is the effect of charity, whereby God dwells in us." Sin of a mortal character is always committed with the consent of reason: "Because the consummation of sin is in the consent of reason"'. (cf. STh II–IIae q.35 a.3) Venial and mortal sins can be compared to sickness and death. While venial sin impairs full healthy activity of a person, mortal sin destroys the principle of spiritual life in him/her.

=== Catechism of the Catholic Church ===
The Catechism of the Catholic Church states the following.

Catholic doctrine distinguishes between personal sin (also sometimes called "actual sin") and original sin. Personal sins are either mortal or venial.

Mortal sins are sins of grave (serious) matter, where the sinner performs the act with full knowledge and deliberate consent. (cf. Catechism of the Catholic Church (§1857) The act of committing a mortal sin destroys charity, i. e. the grace in the heart of a Christian; it is in itself a rejection of God (Catechism of the Catholic Church (§1855). If left un-reconciled, mortal sins may lead to eternal separation from God, traditionally called damnation.

Venial sins are sins which do not meet the conditions for mortal sins. The act of committing a venial sin does not cut off the sinner from God's grace, as the sinner has not rejected God. However, venial sins do injure the relationship between the sinner and God, and as such, must be reconciled to God, either through the Sacrament of Reconciliation or receiving the Eucharist (after proper contrition fulfilled).

Both mortal and venial sins have a dual nature of punishment. They incur both guilt for the sin, yielding eternal punishment in the case of mortal sins and temporal punishment for the sin in the case of both venial and mortal sins. Reconciliation is an act of God's mercy, and addresses the guilt and eternal punishment for sin. Purgatory and indulgences address the temporal punishment for sin, and exercise of God's justice.

Roman Catholic doctrine also sees sin as being twofold: Sin is, at once, any evil or immoral action which infracts God's law and the inevitable consequences, the state of being that comes about by committing the sinful action. Sin can and does alienate a person both from God and the community. Hence, the Catholic Church's insistence on reconciliation with both God and the Church itself.

The Roman Catholic view of sin has recently expanded. Monsignor Gianfranco Girotti, Regent of the Catholic Apostolic Penitentiary, has said that "known sins increasingly manifest themselves as behavior that damages society as a whole," including, for example:

- "certain violations of the fundamental rights of human nature, through genetic manipulations [or experiments],"
- "drug [abuse], which weakens the mind and obscures intelligence,"
- "environmental pollution,"
- "abortion and pedophilia," and
- the widening social and economic differences between the rich and the poor, which "cause an unbearable social injustice" (accumulating excessive wealth, inflicting poverty). The revision was aimed at encouraging confession or the Sacrament of Penance.

Mortal sins, which are any severe and intentional actions that directly disobey God, are often confused with the seven deadly sins, which are pride, envy, wrath, sloth, greed, gluttony, and lust. They are not, however, the same. The seven deadly sins are called "deadly" because they might lead another to commit other sins. Some forms of the seven deadly sins (i.e. debilitating one's health because of their love of food) can constitute as grave matter, while others may just be venial (i.e. over-eating).

Another group of four or five sins distinguished by the Church are the sins that cry to heaven: murder, sodomy, oppression of the weak, and defrauding the laborer.

== Eastern Orthodox views ==
The Eastern Orthodox Church presents a view of sin distinct from views found in Catholicism and in Protestantism, that sin is viewed primarily as a terminal spiritual sickness, rather than a state of guilt, a self-perpetuating illness which distorts the whole human being and energies, corrupts the Image of God inherent in those who bear the human nature, diminishes the divine likeness within them, disorients their understanding of the world as it truly is, and distracts a person from fulfilling his natural potential to become deified in communion with God.

== Lutheran views ==
In Lutheranism, sins are of two classes:

As to their effect, sins are divided into mortal sins and venial sins. Mortal sins are those which result in the death of the sinner. This term takes in all the sins of the unbelievers. In the case of the believers those sins are called mortal which force the Holy Spirit to depart from one’s heart, which destroy faith. Venial sins are sins which, though they in themselves merit eternal death, are daily forgiven to the believer. They are also called sins of weakness. They do not drive the Holy Spirit from the heart, do not extinguish faith.

Venial sins are sins of weakness; they are limited to believers, and do not kill faith, because they are not done intentionally. In themselves they are real sins and are worthy of death, but through faith Christians have forgiveness for them. Mortal sins are such as kill faith and drive the Holy Spirit from the heart, because no man can sin willfully intentionally and at the same time believe in Christ for the forgiveness of his sins.

The Smalcald Articles of Lutheranism teach that apostasy from the Christian faith can occur through loss of faith or through falling into a lifestyle characterized by mortal sin:

It is, accordingly, necessary to know and to teach that when holy men, still having and feeling original sin, also daily repenting of and striving with it, happen to fall into manifest sins, as David into adultery, murder, and blasphemy, that then faith and the Holy Ghost has departed from them [they cast out faith and the Holy Ghost]. For the Holy Ghost does not permit sin to have dominion, to gain the upper hand so as to be accomplished, but represses and restrains it so that it must not do what it wishes. But if it does what it wishes, the Holy Ghost and faith are [certainly] not present. For St. John says, 1 John 3:9: Whosoever is born of God doth not commit sin ... and he cannot sin. And yet it is also the truth when the same St. John says, 1:8: If we say that we have no sin, we deceive ourselves and the truth is not in us.

The Lutheran divine Martin Chemnitz, who contributed to the development of Lutheran systematic theology, delineated what are considered mortal sins:

For Scripture distinguishes between sins, namely that in the saints or reborn there are some sins because of which they are not condemned, but at the same time retain faith, the Holy Spirit, grace, and the forgiveness of sins. (Rom 7:23–8:1; 1 Jn 1:8–9; Ps 32:1). But Scripture testifies that there are also some other sins in which also the reconciled, when they have fallen, lose faith, the Holy Spirit, the grace of God, and life eternal, and render themselves subject to divine wrath and eternal death unless, turned again, they are reconciled to God through faith (Rom 8:13; 1 Cor 6:10; Gal 5:21; Eph 5:5; Col 3:6; 1 Jn 3:6, 8; 1 Tim 1:19; 2 Per 1:9). And the useful distinction between mortal and venial sin is drawn from this basis.

With respect to the examination of conscience, Chemnitz implored Lutheran clergy to remind the faithful of what sins are mortal (especially the seven deadly sins) and venial sins.

== Methodist views ==
The Wesleyan–Arminian theology of Methodism teaches that humans, though being born in total depravity, can turn to God as a result of prevenient grace and do good; this prevenient grace convicts humans of the necessity of the new birth (first work of grace), through which he is justified (pardoned) and regenerated. After this, to willfully sin would be to fall from grace. When the believer is entirely sanctified (second work of grace), his/her original sin is washed away.

Methodist theology firstly distinguishes between original sin and actual sin:

Original sin is the sin which corrupts our nature and gives us the tendency to sin. Actual sins are the sins we commit every day before we are saved, such as lying, swearing, stealing.

It further categorizes sin as being (1) "sin proper" and (2) "involuntary transgression of a divine law, known or unknown" (called infirmities). Sins proper (or sin, properly so called) are those that are committed freely and willfully (which can cause one to fall away). 'Sin, improperly so called' include those in the "category of benign neglect, fruits of infirmity (forgetfulness, lack of knowledge, etc)". In traditional Methodist theology, infirmities are not classified as sins, as explained by Wesley, "Such transgressions you may call sins, if you please: I do not, for the reasons above-mentioned." John Wesley explains the matter like this:

Nothing is sin, strictly speaking, but a voluntary transgression of a known law of God. Therefore, every voluntary breach of the law of love is sin; and nothing else, if we speak properly. To strain the matter farther is only to make way for Calvinism. There may be ten thousand wandering thoughts, and forgetful intervals, without any breach of love, though not without transgressing the Adamic law. But Calvinists would fain confound these together. Let love fill your heart, and it is enough!

If a person backslides through sin proper but later returns to God, he or she must repent and be entirely sanctified again, according to Wesleyan-Arminian theology. With regard to the penalty of sin, Methodist theology teaches:

We believe that sin is the willful transgression of the known law of God, and that such sin condemns a soul to eternal punishment unless pardoned by God through repentance, confession, restitution, and believing in Jesus Christ as his personal Savior. This includes all men "For all have sinned and come short of the glory of God." Rom. 3:23. (Prov. 28:13, John 6:47; Acts 16:31; Rom. 6:23, I John 1:9; I John 3:4).

=== Original sin ===
Wesleyan-Arminian theology holds to the orthodox Christian doctrine of original sin. The Church of the Nazarene explains it as such:

We believe that original sin, or depravity, is that corruption of the nature of all the offspring of Adam by reason of which everyone is very far gone from original righteousness or the pure state of our first parents at the time of their creation, is averse to God, is without spiritual life, and inclined to evil, and that continually. We further believe that original sin continues to exist with the new life of the regenerate, until the heart is fully cleansed by the baptism with the Holy Spirit.

This original sin remains after salvation and may only be removed by entire sanctification (the second work of grace or baptism with the Holy Spirit).

We believe that entire sanctification is that act of God, subsequent to regeneration, by which believers are made free from original sin, or depravity, and brought into a state of entire devotement to God, and the holy obedience of love made perfect. It is wrought by the baptism with or infilling of the Holy Spirit, and comprehends in one experience the cleansing of the heart from sin and the abiding, indwelling presence of the Holy Spirit, empowering the believer for life and service. Entire sanctification is provided by the blood of Jesus, is wrought instantaneously by grace through faith, preceded by entire consecration; and to this work and state of grace the Holy Spirit bears witness.

Holiness adherents are known by their emphasis "on the belief that entire sanctification takes place instantaneously in a crisis experience."

=== Actual sin ===
The definition of sin is a vital doctrine to the Methodist churches, especially those of the Holiness movement. Richard S. Taylor explains "Many, perhaps most, of the errors which have protruded themselves into Christian theology can be finally traced to a faulty conception of sin. Because someone's notions of sin were a bit off-color, his entire trend of reasoning was misdirected."

The Wesleyan Holiness movement, as part of the wider Methodist tradition, holds strongly to John Wesley's definition of sin:

Nothing is sin, strictly speaking, but a voluntary transgression of a known law of God. Therefore, every voluntary breach of the law of love is sin; and nothing else, if we speak properly. To strain the matter farther is only to make way for Calvinism. There may be ten thousand wandering thoughts, and forgetful intervals, without any breach of love, though not without transgressing the Adamic law. But Calvinists would fain confound these together. Let love fill your heart, and it is enough!"

The Church of the Nazarene defines sin as:

We believe that actual or personal sin is a voluntary violation of a known law of God by a morally responsible person. It is therefore not to be confused with involuntary and inescapable shortcomings, infirmities, faults, mistakes, failures, or other deviations from a standard of perfect conduct that are the residual effects of the Fall. However, such innocent effects do not include attitudes or responses contrary to the spirit of Christ, which may properly be called sins of the spirit. We believe that personal sin is primarily and essentially a violation of the law of love; and that in relation to Christ sin may be defined as unbelief.

Methodism, inclusive of the Wesleyan-holiness movement, emphasizes the possibility of freedom from all sin, and the voluntary nature of actual sin. As explained by Charles Ewing Brown "Every sinner in the world today knows more or less clearly that he is doing wrong." H. Orton Wiley, the premier Holiness theologian of the last 100 years, explains that in defining sin, "the power to obey or disobey is an essential element." According to the Methodist cleric Phineas Bresee, the founder of the Nazarene Church, "A failure to distinguish between sin and infirmity, puts an undue emphasis upon sin, and has a tendency to discourage earnest seekers from pressing on to full deliverance form the carnal mind. Calling that sin which is not sin, opens the door to actual sinning." The traditional view in Wesleyan-Arminian theology is that total ignorance eliminates the possibility of sin. As explained by Methodist bishop Francis Asbury: "The transgressor must know the law and willfully act the transgressor, the law is a transcript of the divine nature."

It is with this understanding of actual sin, that lead the Wesleyan-Holiness movement to emphasize the necessity and possibility of living without committing sin. As John Allen Wood, one of the Methodist leaders of the Welsyean-Holiness movement explains in his work, Perfect Love: "The Lowest type of Christian sinneth not and is not condemned. The minimum of salvation is salvation from sinning." This leads D. S. Warner, the founder of the Church of God to conclude "Holiness writers and teachers, as far as my knowledge extends, uniformly hold up a sinless life, as the true test and Bible standard of regeneration."

== Eastern Christian views ==
The (Chalcedonian) Eastern Orthodox Church as well as the (non-Chalcedonian) Oriental Orthodox use "sin" both to refer to humanity's fallen condition and to refer to individual sinful acts. In many ways the Eastern Orthodox Christian view of sin is similar to the Jewish, although neither form of Orthodoxy makes formal distinctions among "grades" of sins.

The Eastern Catholic Churches, which derive their theology and spirituality from same sources as the Eastern Orthodox and Oriental Orthodox, tend not to adhere to the Roman Catholic distinction between mortal and venial sin taught by the Latin Church. Like the Orthodox churches, however, the Eastern Catholic Churches do make a distinction between sins that are serious enough to bar one from Holy Communion (and must be confessed before receiving once again) and those which are not sufficiently serious to do so. In this respect, the Eastern Tradition is similar to the Western, but the Eastern Catholic Churches do not consider death in such a state to automatically mean damnation to "hell."

== Jehovah's Witnesses ==
Jehovah's Witnesses believe that sin is inherited, like a disease, and has been passed on from generation to generation of humans, beginning with Adam and Eve, whom Witnesses believe are real historical characters. They believe that it began with the Devil, and then with humans wanting to decide for themselves what was good and bad. They believe that at that very moment they lost perfection and began to die. Jehovah's Witnesses consider human beings to be souls, and so when a human dies due to sin, they believe that his soul dies as well. They believe that Jesus is the only human ever to have lived and died sinless.

== The Church of Jesus Christ of Latter-day Saints ==
Members of the Church of Jesus Christ of Latter-day Saints believe that individuals are only responsible for the sins they personally commit. Their Articles of Faith teach "We believe that men will be punished for their own sins, and not for Adam's transgression." Latter-day Saints also believe that sin is the consequence of the Fall of Adam and Eve, and that all sin originates from Satan. They also believe that "little children" (meaning those under the age of 8, or "the age of accountability"), while capable of sinning, are not held accountable for their actions, and their sins are covered by the atonement of Jesus Christ.

== Atonement ==
In Christianity, it is generally understood that the death of Jesus was a sacrifice that relieves believers of the burden of their sins. However, the actual meaning of this precept is very widely debated. The traditional teaching of some churches traces this idea of atonement to blood sacrifices in the ancient Hebraic faith.

Christian theologians have presented different interpretations of atonement:

- Barbara Reid, a dissenting Roman Catholic feminist and Dominican nun, argues that commonly conceived atonement theologies are harmful, especially to women and other oppressed minorities. Other liberal and radical theologians have also challenged traditional views of atonement (see collective salvation).
- Billy Graham, a Baptist evangelist, characterized the United States as a most sinful nation and called upon his listeners to repent to Christ while they still had time.

== See also ==
- Biblical law in Christianity
- Christian ethics
- Heaven (Christianity)
- Law of Christ
- Moral theology
- Reconciliation
- Sacraments (Catholic Church)

== Bibliography ==
- Black, Brian (2023). Properly Defining Sin. Middleburg: Heritage Publications.
- Cross, Frank L.; Livingstone, Elizabeth A., eds. (2005). Oxford Dictionary of the Christian Church. Oxford: University Press. ISBN 978-0-19-280290-3.
- Farrell, Walter, A Companion to the Summa vol. 2 The Pursuit of Happiness (1985 reprinted 2nd ed.). Westminster, Maryland; London: Christian Classics, Sheed & Ward, ISBN 0-7220-2520-3 (UK); ISBN 0-87061-119-4 (USA). p. 467.
- Harrison, Carol (2016). "Truth in a Heresy?". The Expository Times. 112 (3): 78–82. doi:10.1177/001452460011200302. S2CID 170152314.
- Mc Guinness, I. Sin (Theology of), in: New Catholic Encyclopaedia, vol. XIII, (reprinted 1981), The Catholic University of America, Washington D.C., pp. 241–245.
- Puchniak, Robert (2008). "Pelagius: Kierkegaard's Use of Pelagius and Pelagianism". In Stewart, Jon Bartley (ed.). Kierkegaard and the Patristic and Medieval Traditions. Ashgate Publishing, Ltd. ISBN 978-0-7546-6391-1.
- Pieper, Josef, The Concept of Sin (2001), translated by Edward T. Oakes SJ, South Bend, Indiana: St. Augustines Press, ISBN 1-890318-08-6, pp. 128.
- Rahner, Karl, Schoonberg, Piet. "Sin", in: Encyclopedia of Theology: A Concise Sacramentum Mundi . (1986) Tunbridge Wells, Kent, UK: Burns & Oates, ISBN 0-86012-228-X, pp. 1579–1590.
- Sabourin, Leopold SJ, Sin, in: The Oxford Companion to the Bible (1993). Bruce M. Metzger, Michael D. Coogan (ed.) New York – Oxford: Oxford University Press, ISBN 0-19-504645-5, pp. 696.
- Pinckaers, Servais, The Sources of Christian Ethics, (translated from French by M. T. Noble O.P.), Washington, D.C., The Catholic University of America Press, 1995. Reprinted: Edinburgh: T&T Clark, ISBN 0-567-29287-8 p. 489
- Vawter, Bruce (1983). "Original Sin". In Richardson, Alan; Bowden, John (eds.). The Westminster Dictionary of Christian Theology. Westminster John Knox. ISBN 9780664227487.
- Visotzky, Burton L. (2009). "Will and Grace: Aspects of Judaising in Pelagianism in Light of Rabbinic and Patristic Exegesis of Genesis". In Grypeou, Emmanouela; Spurling, Helen (eds.). The Exegetical Encounter Between Jews and Christians in Late Antiquity. Leiden: Brill. pp. 43–62. ISBN 978-90-04-17727-7.
