= Mortal sin =

Sinful act which can lead to damnation

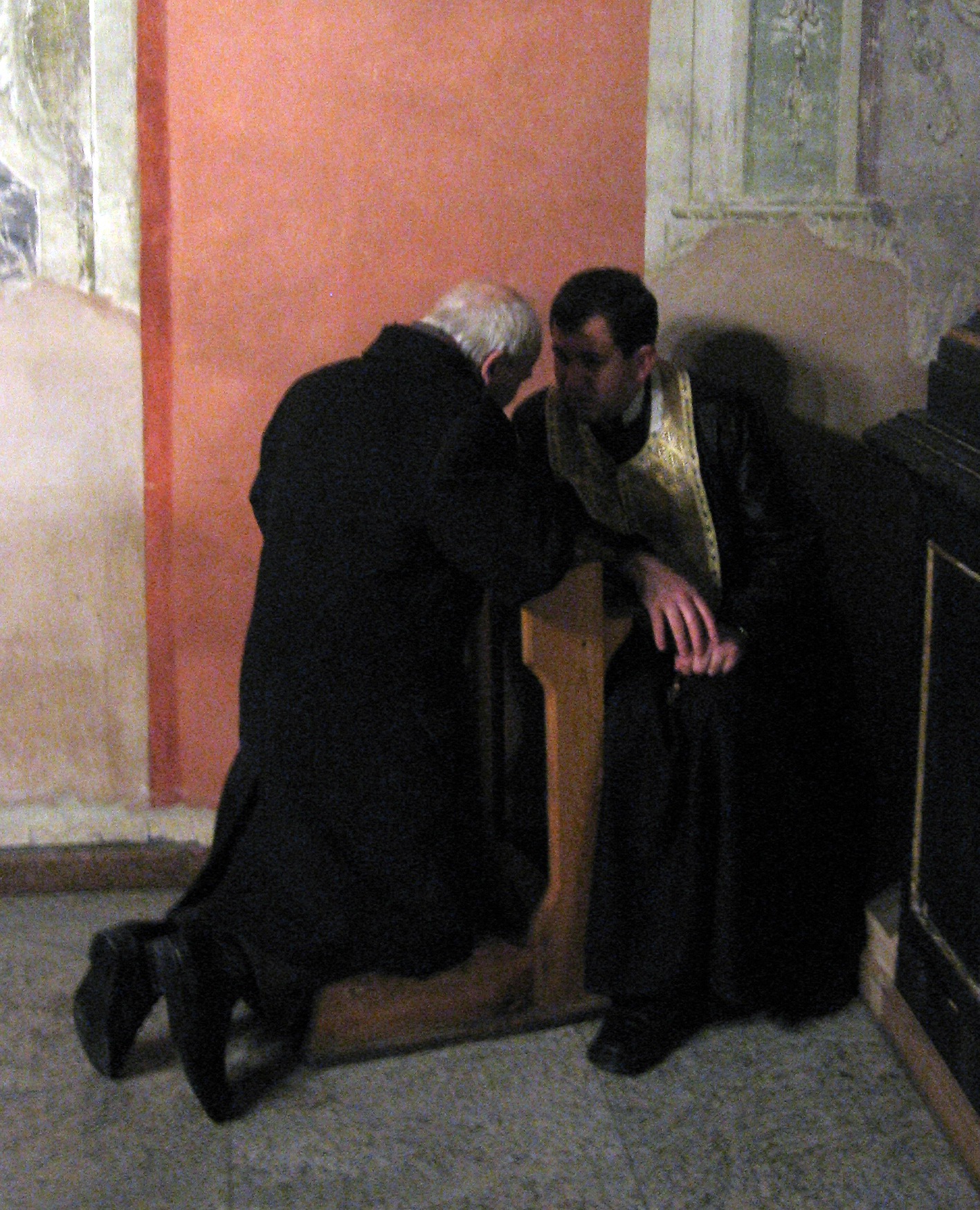
A penitent confessing his sins in the Ukrainian Greek Catholic Church of the Bernardines in Lviv, Ukraine

A mortal sin (Latin: peccātum mortāle) is, in Christian theology, a gravely sinful act that leads to damnation if a person does not repent before death. It is also referred to as a deadly, grave, or serious sin. The concept is found in both Catholicism and Lutheranism. In Catholic theology, a mortal sin separates a person from God's saving grace. Three conditions must be met for a sin to be considered mortal: the act must involve "grave matter", be committed with "full knowledge", and be performed with "full and deliberate consent".

Examples of grave matter often relate to violations of the Ten Commandments. Common pastoral examples include getting drunk, engaging in unlawful sexual activity, stealing a substantial amount of property, or deliberately missing mass on Sunday or Holy Days of Obligation. The "sin against the Holy Spirit" and the "sins that cry to Heaven for vengeance" are also regarded as especially serious. According to Denis O'Callaghan, a Catholic priest, mortal sin can be understood not only as an action but as a state of separation from God. Bill Cosgrove, another priest, similarly notes that sin involves a person's goals and priorities, not only individual acts.

Mortal sins differ from venial sins, which weaken a person's relationship with God rather than sever it. According to James MacLoughlin, venial sins can reduce spiritual readiness, lessen the fruitfulness of the Mass and the sacraments, lengthen purgatory, and potentially dispose a person toward committing mortal sin. Despite the seriousness of a mortal sin, repentance is possible through the sacrament of Confession, which is the primary means for forgiveness and absolution. The Council of Trent affirmed Confession and the Act of Contrition for absolution as part of Catholic doctrine. Confession is practiced in Lutheran churches as well. Confession is historically observed on Saturdays in preparation for Sunday worship.

== Origin ==
Since some baptized members denied Christ to avoid persecutions, the Church fathers realized it was "possible to lose the grace of salvation after baptism", requiring repentance to be saved from eternal punishment. In this case, those predestined with God's grace were not "predestined to remain with him until glory". Many of the earlier leaders of the Church believed in the concept of mortal sin with this reasoning. The Catholic Church believes that "mortal sin destroys charity in the heart of man by a grave violation of God's law", dividing between mortal and venial sins:

When the will sets itself upon something that is of its nature incompatible with the charity that orients man toward his ultimate end, then the sin is mortal by its very object . . . whether it contradicts the love of God, such as blasphemy or perjury, or the love of neighbor, such as homicide or adultery.... But when the sinner's will is set upon something that of its nature involves a disorder, but is not opposed to the love of God and neighbor, such as thoughtless chatter or immoderate laughter and the like, such sins are venial.

The concept of mortal sin is hinted at in some works of the early Fathers of the Church and explicit in others. In AD 385, Pacian of Barcelona, in his Sermon Exhorting to Penance, (Note: For full text of sermon, see The Extant Works of Saint Pacian (1842), or online transcription) gives contempt of God, murder, and fornication as examples of "mortal" or "capital sins". In AD 393, St. Jerome writes:

There are venial sins and there are mortal sins. It is one thing to owe ten thousand talents, another to owe but a farthing. We shall have to give an accounting for an idle word no less than for adultery. But to be made to blush and to be tortured are not the same thing; not the same thing to grow red in the face and to be in agony for a long time. [...] If we entreat for lesser sins we are granted pardon, but for greater sins, it is difficult to obtain our request. There is a great difference between one sin and another.

— Against Jovinianus, 2:30

=== New Testament ===
The term mortal sin is thought to be derived from the New Testament of the Bible. Specifically, it has been suggested by Jimmy Buehler from Theocast that the term comes from 1 John 5:16–17. In this particular verse, the author of the epistle writes "There is a sin that leads to death."

Now the works of the flesh are manifest, which are fornication, uncleanness, immodesty, luxury, Idolatry, witchcrafts, enmities, contentions, emulations, wraths, quarrels, dissensions, sects, Envies, murders, drunkenness, revellings, and such like. Of the which I foretell you, as I have foretold to you, that they who do such things shall not obtain the kingdom of God. -Galatians 5:19-21 in the public domain Douai-Rheims Bible

== Catholicism ==
In the moral theology of Catholicism, a mortal sin requires that all of the following conditions are met:

1. Its subject matter must be grave. (The term grave sin is used at times to indicate grave matter, and at times to indicate mortal sin. But it always remains true that the following two conditions are requisite for mortal sin.)
2. It must be committed with full knowledge (and awareness) of the sinful action and the gravity of the offense.
3. It must be committed with deliberate and complete consent.

The Catechism of the Catholic Church defines grave matter:

Grave matter is specified by the Ten Commandments, corresponding to the answer of Jesus to the rich young man: "Do not murder, Do not commit adultery, Do not steal, Do not bear false witness, Do not defraud, Honor your father and your mother." The gravity of sins is more or less great: murder is graver than theft. One must also take into account who is wronged: violence against parents is in itself graver than violence against a stranger.

— CCC 1858

Although the Church itself does not provide a precise list of grave sins or divide actions into grave and venial categories, Church documents do name certain "grave sins" as well as "offenses" and "actions" whose subject-matter is considered to be grave. For example, in the area of human sexuality, the Catechism of the Catholic Church notes that the following actions can involve increased gravity: extramarital sex, divorce (but not legitimate separation), and masturbation. The sins against the Holy Spirit and the sins that cry to Heaven for vengeance are considered especially serious. Further, Pope Francis and many bishops privately regarded certain sins as mortal, for example child abuse or neglect of one's parents.

With respect to a person's full knowledge of a certain act being a grave sin, the Catholic Church teaches that "unintentional ignorance can diminish or even remove the imputability of a grave offense. But no one is deemed to be ignorant of the principles of the moral law, which are written in the conscience of every man. The promptings of feelings and passions can also diminish the voluntary and free character of the offense, as can external pressures or pathological disorders (mental illness). Sin committed through malice, by deliberate choice of evil, is the gravest." Furthermore, Catholic teaching also holds that "imputability and responsibility for an action can be diminished or even nullified by ignorance, inadvertence, duress, fear, habit, inordinate attachments, and other psychological or social factors."

Mortal sins must be confessed by naming the specific offence along with how many times it was committed.

According to the Catholic Church, no person can receive the Eucharist when in a state of mortal sin:

Anyone who is aware of having committed a mortal sin must not receive Holy Communion, even if he experiences deep contrition, without having first received sacramental absolution, unless he has a grave reason for receiving Communion and there is no possibility of going to confession.

— CCC 1457

Some mortal sins cause automatic excommunication by the very deed itself, for example renunciation of faith and religion, known as apostasy, desecration of the Eucharistic species, and "a completed abortion". These mortal sins are so serious that the church through law has made them crimes. The church forbids the excommunicated from receiving any sacrament (not just the Eucharist) and also severely restricts the person's participation in other church liturgical acts and offices. A repentant excommunicated person may talk to a priest, usually in a confessional, about their excommunication to arrange for the remission. Remission cannot be denied to someone who has truly repented their actions and has also made suitable reparation for damages and scandal or at least has seriously promised to do so. However, even if excommunicated, a Catholic who has not been juridically absolved is still, due to the irrevocable nature of baptism, a member of the Catholic Church and therefore must still carry out their obligations of fulfilling their duties of attending Mass, Divine Liturgy, etc. on a Holy Day of Obligation, abstaining from meat on the Fridays of Lent, etc., albeit their communion with Christ and the church is gravely impaired. "Perpetual penalties cannot be imposed or declared by decree." However, "the following are expiatory penalties which can affect an offender either perpetually".

Since the mid-20th century, some theologians have taught that a person who lives by a constant attitude of charity is unlikely to fall in and out of God's graces without being profoundly aware of the change. The term "fundamental option" arose and is used in a variety of senses.

Pope John Paul II reaffirmed traditional teaching going back to the Council of Trent in his encyclical Veritatis Splendor, as does the Catechism of the Catholic Church, which states: "The teaching of the Church affirms the existence of hell and its eternity. Immediately after death the souls of those who die in a state of mortal sin descend into hell, where they suffer the punishments of hell, 'eternal fire'." The Catechism then adds: "The chief punishment of hell is eternal separation from God, in whom alone man can possess the life and happiness for which he was created and for which he longs." However, the Catechism does not by name say a specific person is in Hell, but it does say that "our freedom has the power to make choices for ever, with no turning back." Most significantly, the Catechism also proclaims that "There are no limits to the mercy of God". and that "although we can judge that an act is in itself a grave offence, we must entrust judgment of persons to the justice and mercy of God." One cannot see into their mind to know if it was deliberate or committed in full knowledge. Also, like the father in the Parable of the Prodigal Son, God forgives those who repent sincerely. The Second Vatican Council, in its Dogmatic Constitution Lumen Gentium, reflects the traditional teaching of the church on punishment, and on merit or reward for good deeds.

Mortal sin is ordinarily remitted by the priestly absolution in the Sacrament of Penance. However, the effectiveness of the absolution is dependent of the acts of the penitent starting with sorrow for sin or contrition. Perfect contrition, coupled with the firm resolution to sin no more and to make recourse to the sacrament of Penance as soon as possible, can restore a person's relationship with God, as well as God's saving grace, that is, sanctifying grace. This teaching on perfect contrition is a reminder that God's mercy and forgiveness is available outside the Sacrament of Penance, yet also indicates that Catholics who know about Christ's institution of the sacrament of Penance must intend to use it. Any human act that arises from a person's love of God, is inspired by God's prevenient action and is directed to doing as God requires. When perfect contrition is the means by which one seeks to restore one's relationship with God, there must also be a resolution to confess all mortal sins (that have not been confessed and absolved previously) in the Sacrament of Penance.

=== Eastern Catholic churches ===
Autonomous, self-governing (Latin: sui iuris), Catholic particular churches and liturgical rites in full communion with the Bishop of Rome, the Pope, that accept the dogmas of Papal Supremacy and Infallibility, are known as the Eastern Catholic churches. They derive their theology and spirituality from some of the same sources as the Eastern Orthodox and Oriental Orthodox churches, yet use the Latin Catholic distinction between mortal and venial sin. However, names other than mortal and venial are often used.

== Examples ==
The following is a partial alphabetical list of actions that are defined as constituting grave matter, according to the Catechism of the Catholic Church or like sources (such as declarations by the Congregation for the Doctrine of the Faith, Apostolic Letters, or other sources printed by Church authorities).

Name	Description
Abortion	"Direct abortion, that is, abortion willed as an end or as a means," is "gravely contrary to the moral law. The Church imposes the canonical penalty of excommunication for this crime against human life."
Encouragement of another's grave sins or vices	"Every word or attitude is forbidden which by flattery, adulation, or complaisance encourages and confirms another in malicious acts and perverse conduct. Adulation is a grave fault if it makes one an accomplice in another's vices or grave sins. Neither the desire to be of service nor friendship justifies duplicitous speech. Adulation is a venial sin when it only seeks to be agreeable, to avoid evil, to meet a need, or to obtain legitimate advantages."
Adultery	"refers to marital infidelity. When two partners, of whom at least one is married to another party, have sexual relations – even transient ones – they commit adultery. Christ condemns even adultery of mere desire. The sixth commandment and the New Testament forbid adultery absolutely. The prophets denounce the gravity of adultery; they see it as an image of the sin of idolatry."
Apostasy	"the total repudiation of the Christian faith"
Blasphemy	"is contrary to the respect due God and his holy name. It is in itself a grave sin." "It consists in uttering against God – inwardly or outwardly – words of hatred, reproach, or defiance; in speaking ill of God; in failing in respect toward him in one's speech; in misusing God's name."
Cheating and unfair wagers	"Unfair wagers and cheating at games constitute grave matter, unless the damage inflicted is so slight that the one who suffers it cannot reasonably consider it significant."
Contraception	"Similarly excluded is any action which either before, at the moment of, or after sexual intercourse, is specifically intended to prevent procreation – whether as an end or as a means." "On the other hand, the Church does not consider at all illicit the use of those therapeutic means necessary to cure bodily diseases, even if a foreseeable impediment to procreation should result there from – provided such impediment is not directly intended for any motive whatsoever."
Detraction	"who, without objectively valid reason, discloses another's faults and failings to persons who did not know them"
Defrauding a worker of a just wage	"A just wage is the legitimate fruit of work. To refuse or withhold it can be a grave injustice. In determining fair pay both the needs and the contributions of each person must be taken into account. 'Remuneration for work should guarantee man the opportunity to provide a dignified livelihood for himself and his family on the material, social, cultural and spiritual level, taking into account the role and the productivity of each, the state of the business, and the common good.' Agreement between the parties is not sufficient to justify morally the amount to be received in wages."
Divorce	"If civil divorce remains the only possible way of ensuring certain legal rights, the care of the children, physical or mental safety, or the protection of inheritance, it can be tolerated and does not constitute a moral offense."
Endangerment of human life or safety	Endangering one's own life or the safety of others (e.g., by drunkenness, a love of speed on the road, at sea, or in the air, or gross negligence).
Participation in Freemasonry	"The faithful who enroll in Masonic associations are in a state of grave sin and may not receive Holy Communion."
Envy	If to the level of wishing grave harm to another.
Euthanasia	Of human beings; euthanising animals is not considered an offense.
Extreme anger	At the level of truly and deliberately desiring to seriously hurt or kill someone
Fornication	"is carnal union between an unmarried man and an unmarried woman." "Among the sins gravely contrary to chastity are masturbation, fornication, pornography, and homosexual practices."
Hatred	Of a neighbor to the point of deliberately desiring them great harm
Heresy	"the obstinate post-baptismal denial of some truth which must be believed with divine and catholic faith, or it is likewise an obstinate doubt concerning the same"
Homosexual actions	"Among the sins gravely contrary to chastity are masturbation, fornication, pornography, and homosexual practices."
Incest	"corrupts family relationships and marks a regression toward animality."
Lying	Can be a mortal sin. The gravity is measured by "the truth it deforms, the circumstances, the intentions of the one who lies, and the harm suffered by its victims." If not grave matter, lying is a venial sin.
Masturbation	The gravity is measured by, "the affective immaturity, force of acquired habit, conditions of anxiety or other psychological or social factors that lessen, if not even reduce to a minimum, moral culpability." "Among the sins gravely contrary to chastity are masturbation, fornication, pornography, and homosexual practices."
Missing Mass	"[T]he faithful are obliged to participate in the Eucharist on days of obligation, unless excused for a serious reason (for example, illness, the care of infants) or dispensed by their own pastor. Those who deliberately fail in this obligation commit a grave sin." However, the gravity of this omission may be seldom realized in practice today.
Murder	"The fifth commandment forbids direct and intentional killing as gravely sinful." "The fifth commandment forbids doing anything with the intention of indirectly bringing about a person's death. The moral law prohibits exposing someone to mortal danger without grave reason, as well as refusing assistance to a person in danger. The acceptance by human society of murderous famines, without efforts to remedy them, is a scandalous injustice and a grave offense. Those whose usurious and avaricious dealings lead to the hunger and death of their brethren in the human family indirectly commit homicide, which is imputable to them. Unintentional killing is not morally imputable. But one is not exonerated from grave offense if, without proportionate reasons, he has acted in a way that brings about someone's death, even without the intention to do so." Self-defense or defense of others when there is no other way may involve homicide but does not constitute murder. However, the death penalty is no longer seen by the church's magisterium as being justifiable. Murder is viewed as especially reprehensible since humans were created in the image of God.
Perjury	"a perjury is committed when he makes a promise under oath with no intention of keeping it, or when after promising on oath he does not keep it."
Polygamy	"is contrary to the equal personal dignity of men and women who in matrimony give themselves with a love that is total and therefore unique and exclusive." The Christian who has previously lived in polygamy has a grave duty in justice to honor the obligations contracted in regard to his former wives and his children.
Pornography	"does grave injury to the dignity of its participants (actors, vendors, the public), since each one becomes an object of base pleasure and illicit profit for others. It immerses all who are involved in the illusion of a fantasy world. It is a grave offense."
Practicing magic or sorcery	"All practices of magic or sorcery, by which one attempts to tame occult powers, so as to place them at one's service and have a supernatural power over others – even if this were for the sake of restoring their health – are gravely contrary to the virtue of religion. These practices are even more to be condemned when accompanied by the intention of harming someone, or when they have recourse to the intervention of demons. Wearing charms is also reprehensible. Spiritism often implies divination or magical practices; the Church for her part warns the faithful against it. Recourse to so-called traditional cures does not justify either the invocation of evil powers or the exploitation of another's credulity."
Prostitution	"While it is always gravely sinful to engage in prostitution, the imputability of the offense can be attenuated by destitution, blackmail, or social pressure."
Rape	"is the forcible violation of the sexual intimacy of another person. It does injury to justice and charity. Rape wounds the respect, freedom, and physical and moral integrity to which every person has a right. It causes grave damage that can mark the victim for life."
Sacrilege	"consists in profaning or treating unworthily the sacraments and other liturgical actions, as well as persons, things, or places consecrated to God."
Scandalising	Deliberately causing someone to sin gravely, especially when the scandaliser is strong, and the scandalized person is weak, thus jeopardising their relationship to God and their eternal salvation.
Schism	"the refusal of submission to the Roman Pontiff or of communion with the members of the Church subject to him."
Simony	Buying or selling spiritual things, such as sacraments.
Stealing / Theft	Not all stealing constitutes grave matter. "Unfair wagers and cheating at games constitute grave matter, unless the damage inflicted is so slight that the one who suffers it cannot reasonably consider it significant." "A just wage is the legitimate fruit of work. To refuse or withhold it can be a grave injustice. In determining fair pay both the needs and the contributions of each person must be taken into account"
Suicide	"Grave psychological disturbances, anguish, or grave fear of hardship, suffering, or torture can diminish the responsibility of the one committing suicide." "We should not despair of the eternal salvation of persons who have taken their own lives. By ways known to him alone, God can provide the opportunity for salutary repentance. The Church prays for persons who have taken their own lives."
Terrorism	"Terrorism threatens, wounds, and kills indiscriminately; it is gravely against justice and charity."

== Lutheranism ==
In Lutheranism, sins are of two classes:

As to their effect, sins are divided into mortal sins and venial sins. Mortal sins are those which result in the death of the sinner. This term takes in all the sins of the unbelievers. In the case of the believers those sins are called mortal which force the Holy Spirit to depart from one's heart, which destroy faith. Venial sins are sins which, though they in themselves merit eternal death, are daily forgiven to the believer. They are also called sins of weakness. They do not drive the Holy Spirit from the heart, do not extinguish faith.

Venial sins are sins of weakness; they are limited to believers, and do not kill faith, because they are not done intentionally. In themselves they are real sins and are worthy of death, but through faith Christians have forgiveness for them. Mortal sins are such as kill faith and drive the Holy Spirit from the heart, because no man can sin willfully intentionally and at the same time believe in Christ for the forgiveness of his sins.

The Smalcald Articles of Lutheranism teach that apostasy from the Christian faith can occur through loss of faith or through falling into a lifestyle characterized by mortal sin:

It is, accordingly, necessary to know and to teach that when holy men, still having and feeling original sin, also daily repenting of and striving with it, happen to fall into manifest sins, as David into adultery, murder, and blasphemy, that then faith and the Holy Ghost has departed from them [they cast out faith and the Holy Ghost]. For the Holy Ghost does not permit sin to have dominion, to gain the upper hand so as to be accomplished, but represses and restrains it so that it must not do what it wishes. But if it does what it wishes, the Holy Ghost and faith are [certainly] not present. For St. John says, 1 John 3:9: Whosoever is born of God doth not commit sin [...] and he cannot sin. And yet it is also the truth when the same St. John says, 1:8: If we say that we have no sin, we deceive ourselves and the truth is not in us.

The Lutheran divine Martin Chemnitz, who contributed to the development of Lutheran systematic theology, delineated what are considered mortal sins:

For Scripture distinguishes between sins, namely that in the saints or reborn there are some sins because of which they are not condemned, but at the same time retain faith, the Holy Spirit, grace, and the forgiveness of sins. (Rom 7:23–8:1; 1 Jn 1:8–9; Ps 32:1). But Scripture testifies that there are also some other sins in which also the reconciled, when they have fallen, lose faith, the Holy Spirit, the grace of God, and life eternal, and render themselves subject to divine wrath and eternal death unless, turned again, they are reconciled to God through faith (Rom 8:13; 1 Cor 6:10; Gal 5:21; Eph 5:5; Col 3:6; 1 Jn 3:6, 8; 1 Tim 1:19; 2 Per 1:9). And the useful distinction between mortal and venial sin is drawn from this basis.

With respect to the examination of conscience, Chemnitz implored Lutheran clergy to remind the faithful of what sins are mortal (especially the seven deadly sins) and those that are venial.

== Eastern Orthodoxy ==
According to Father Allyne Smith: "While the Roman Catholic tradition has identified particular acts as 'mortal' sins, in the Eastern Orthodox tradition we see that only a sin for which we don't repent is 'mortal.'"

According to the Mission of The Orthodox Church in America, in answer to a parishioner's query:

In the Orthodox Church there are no "categories" of sin as found in the Christian West. In the pre–Vatican II Catholic catechism, sins were categorized as "mortal" and "venial". In this definition, a "mortal" sin was one which would prevent someone from entering heaven unless one confessed it before death. [...] These categories do not exist in the Orthodox Church. Sin is sin. Concerning Confession, having a list of deadly sins could, in fact, become an obstacle to genuine repentance. For example, imagine that you commit a sin. You look on the list and do not find it listed. It would be very easy to take the attitude that, since it is not on a list of deadly sins, it is not too serious. Hence, you do not feel the need to seek God's forgiveness right away. A week passes and you have completely forgotten about what you had done. You never sought God's forgiveness; as a result, you did not receive it, either. We should go to Confession when we sin – at the very least, we should ask God to forgive us daily in our personal prayers. We should not see Confession as a time to confess only those sins which may be found on a list.

Though not part of the dogma of the Orthodox Church, the mortal–venial distinction is assumed by some Orthodox authors and saints as a theologoumenon. For example, Saint Ignatius Brianchaninov (1807–1867), who wrote primarily for monks, says in his book A Word on Death, in a chapter entitled "Mortal sin":

It has been said earlier that mortal sin of an Orthodox Christian, not being cured by repentance, submits him to eternal suffering; it has also been said that the unbelievers, Muslims, and other non-orthodox, even here are the possession of hell, and are deprived of any hope of salvation, being deprived of Christ, the only means of salvation. Mortal sins for Christians are the next: heresy, schism, blasphemy, apostasy, witchery, despair, suicide, fornication, adultery, unnatural carnal sins, (Note: Under "unnatural carnal sins" the following are implied: sodomy, bestiality, masturbation, and any unnatural intercourse between married people (such as using contraceptives, consummated oral or consummated anal intercourse, etc.) as is explained in the book Ascetical Trials, also written by Saint Ignatius Brianchaninov (1807–1867).) incest, drunkenness, sacrilege, murder, theft, robbery, and every cruel and brutal injury. Only one of these sins – suicide – cannot be healed by repentance, and every one of them slays the soul and makes the soul incapable of eternal bliss, until he/she cleans himself/herself with due repentance. If a man falls but once in any of these sins, he dies by soul: For whosoever shall keep the whole law, and yet offend in one, he is guilty of all. For he that said, Do not commit adultery, said also, Do not kill. Now if thou commit no adultery, yet if thou kill, thou art become a transgressor of the law. (James 2:10,11)

Similarly, the Exomologetarion of Nicodemus the Hagiorite (1749–1809) distinguishes seven classes of sin:

1. Pardonable
2. Near the pardonable
3. Non-mortal
4. Near the non-mortal
5. Between the mortal and the non-mortal
6. Near the mortal
7. Mortal

Nicodemus gives the following example for the seven classes of sin. "The initial movement of anger is pardonable; near to the pardonable is for someone to say harsh words and get hot-tempered. A non-mortal sin is to swear; near the non-mortal is for someone to strike with the hand. Between the non-mortal and the mortal is to strike with a small stick; near the mortal is to strike with a large stick, or with a knife, but not in the area of the head. A mortal sin is to murder. A similar pattern applies to the other sins. Wherefore, those sins nearer to the pardonable end are penanced lighter, while those nearer to the mortal end are more severely penanced."

He also stipulates seven conditions of sin:

1. Who is the doer of the sin
2. What sin was committed
3. Why was it committed
4. In what manner was it committed
5. At what time/age was it committed
6. Where was it committed
7. How many times was it committed

== See also ==
- Ancestral sin
- Blasphemy against the Holy Ghost
- Blood atonement
- Original sin
- Seven deadly sins
- Sins that cry to heaven
- Jewish views on sin
- Islamic views on sin
- Catholic hamartiology
