= Contrition =

Christian concept of repentance for sins

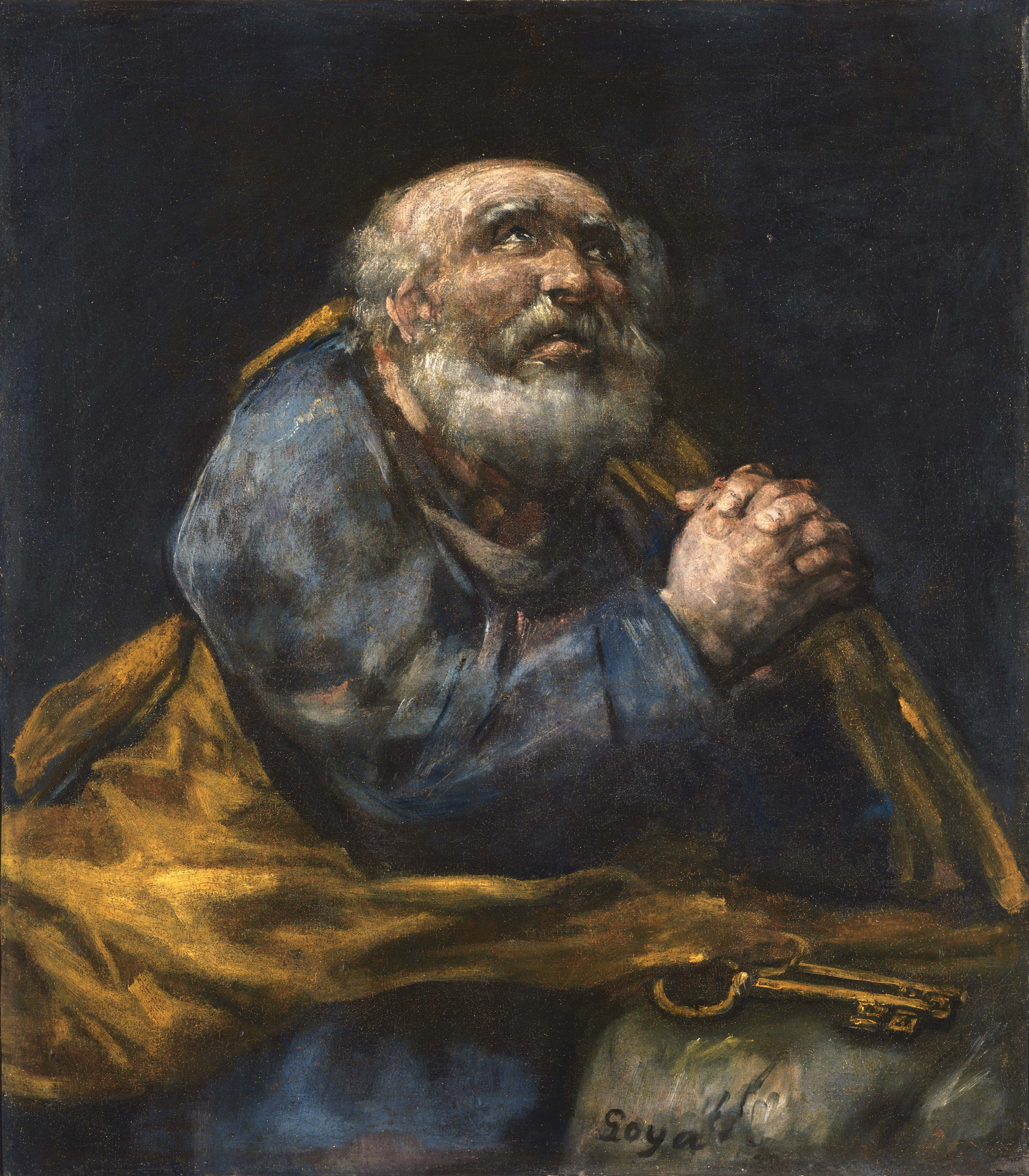
The Repentant Saint Peter, c. 1820 – c. 1824, Francisco Goya

In Christianity, contrition or contriteness (from Latin contritus 'ground to pieces, breaking of something hardened', is repentance for sins one has committed. The remorseful person is said to be contrite.

A central concept in much of Christianity, contrition is regarded as the first step, through Christ, towards reconciliation with God. It consists of repentance for all one's sins, a desire for God over sin, and faith in Christ's redemption on the cross and its sufficiency for salvation (see regeneration and ordo salutis). The concept of contrition is widely referenced throughout the Bible, including in Ezekiel 33:11, Psalms 6:7ff., Psalm 51:1–12, Luke 13:5, Luke 18:9–13, and the well-known Parable of the Prodigal Son (Luke 15:11–32).

== In the Catholic Church ==
=== Origin ===
The Council of Trent defined contrition as a "sorrow of the soul and detestation for the sin committed, together with the resolution not to sin again." It is also known as animi cruciatus (affliction of spirit) and compunctio cordis (repentance of heart).

The word "contrition" implies breaking something that has become hardened. Thomas Aquinas, in his Commentary on the Master of the Sentences, thus explains its peculiar use: "Since it is requisite for the remission of sin that a man cast away entirely the liking for sin, which implies a sort of continuity and solidity in his mind, the act which obtains forgiveness is termed by a figure of speech 'contrition'." This sorrow of soul is not merely speculative sorrow for wrong done, remorse of conscience, or a resolve to amend; it is a real pain and bitterness of soul together with a hatred and horror for the sin committed, and this hatred for sin leads to the resolve to sin no more. The early Christian writers in speaking of the nature of contrition sometimes insist on the feeling of sorrow, sometimes on the detestation of the wrong committed. Augustine includes both when writing: "Compunctus corde non solet dici nisi stimulus peccatorum in dolore pœnitendi". (translation: “It is not customary to say that the heart is contrite except as an incentive to repent of sins in pain.”)

Nearly all the medieval theologians hold that contrition is based principally on the detestation of sin. This detestation presupposes knowledge of the heinousness of sin, and this knowledge begets sorrow and soul pain. "A sin is committed by the consent, so it is blotted out by the dissent of the rational will; hence, contrition is essentially sorrow. But sorrow has a twofold signification—dissent of the will and the consequent feeling; the former is of the essence of contrition, and the latter is its effect."

=== Necessity ===
The formal doctrine of the church, announced through the Council of Trent, declares that contrition has always been necessary to obtain pardon of one's sins. Contrition is the first and indispensable condition for pardon. While it is possible for one to receive pardon where confession is impossible, there is no case where sin can be pardoned without contrition.

According to the Catholic Encyclopedia, Catholic writers have always insisted that such necessity arises (a) from the very nature of repentance as well as (b) from the positive command of God. From the very nature of repentance, they point out that the sentence of Christ in Luke 13:5 is final: "Except you repent", etc., and from the Church Fathers they cite passages such as the following from Cyprian, De Lapsis, no. 32: "Do penance in full, give proof of the sorrow that comes from a grieving and lamenting soul. ... They who do away with repentance for sin, close the door to satisfaction." Scholastic doctors laid down the satisfaction principle, "No one can begin a new life who does not repent him of the old" (Bonaventure, In Lib. Sent. IV, dist. xvi, Pt. II, art. 1, Q. ii, also ex professo, ibid., Pt. I, art. I, Q. iii), and when asked the reason why, they point out the absolute incongruity of turning to God and clinging to sin, which is hostile to God's law. The Council of Trent, mindful of the tradition of the ages, defined (Sess. XlV. ch. iv de Contritione) that "contrition has always been necessary for obtaining forgiveness of sin". The positive command of God is also clear in the premises. John the Baptist sounded the note of preparation for the coming of the Messiah: "Make straight his paths"; and, as a consequence "they went out to him and were baptized confessing their sins". The first preaching of Jesus is described in the words: "Do penance, for the kingdom of heaven is at hand"; and the Apostles, in their first sermons to the people, warn them to "do penance and be baptized for the remission of their sins" (Acts 2:38). The Fathers followed up with like exhortation (Clement in P.G., I, 341; Hermas iii P.G., II, 894; Tertullian in P.L., II).

=== Perfect and imperfect contrition ===
In Catholic terminology, contrition arising from the love of God, who is believed to have been grievously offended, is called perfect contrition. Contrition arising from any other motive, such as loss of heaven, fear of hell, or the heinousness of guilt, is called imperfect contrition, or attrition.

==== Perfect contrition ====
Perfect contrition (also called contrition of charity) is a repentance for sin that is motivated by faith and the love of God. It contrasts with imperfect contrition, which arises from a less pure motive, such as common decency or fear of Hell. The two types of contrition are distinguished by a person's motive for repentance, rather than the intensity of one's feelings or emotions. Catholicism teaches that it is possible for perfect and imperfect contrition to be experienced simultaneously.

To qualify as perfect contrition, the motive must be founded on God's own goodness, not merely his goodness to the sinner or to humanity. Catholicism holds that there is no way of knowing with an absolute certainty if one has made an act of perfect contrition, but all that is required is the standard of all human action, moral certainty. If one says an act of contrition truthfully, intending it, then one would likely have moral certainty.

Catholicism teaches that perfect contrition removes the guilt and eternal punishment due to mortal sin, even before the sinner has received absolution in the sacrament of penance, provided that the person has a firm resolution to have recourse to sacramental confession as soon as possible. An example of this theological precept is demonstrated in the Code of Canon Law in canon 916, which states: "A person who is conscious of grave sin is not to celebrate Mass or receive the body of the Lord without previous sacramental confession unless there is a grave reason and there is no opportunity to confess; in this case the person is to remember the obligation to make an act of perfect contrition which includes the resolution of confessing as soon as possible."

In the case of imminent death, in which sacramental confession may not be possible, an act of perfect contrition is held to remove the guilt and eternal punishment due to mortal sin.

==== Imperfect contrition ====
In contrast to perfect contrition, imperfect contrition (also known as attrition) is defined as a desire not to sin for a reason other than love of God. Catholic teaching holds that imperfect contrition does not produce justification, but does dispose the soul to receive grace in the sacrament of penance. Catholic theologians generally hold that a person who receives a sacrament while unaware of a mortal sin receives justification if they have imperfect contrition.

The Council of Trent (1545–1563) held that while imperfect contrition is motivated by reasons such as "the consideration of the turpitude of sin or from the fear of Hell and punishment", it also is a gift from God. "If any man assert that attrition ... is not a true and a profitable sorrow; that it does not prepare the soul for grace, but that it makes a man a hypocrite, yea, even a greater sinner, let him be Anathema."

Scriptures cited in support of imperfect contrition include:

- Proverbs 13:13
- Proverbs 14:26–27
- Proverbs 19:23
- Matthew 10:28
- Philippians 2:12, in which Paul exhorts Christians to work out "our salvation in fear and trembling".
- Psalm 111:10, "The fear of the Lord is the beginning of wisdom."

===== Criticism of imperfect contrition =====
In his 1537 Apology of the Augsburg Confession, Philipp Melanchthon argued against the concept of imperfect contrition on the basis that it leaves the penitent person uncertain:

When, however, will a terrified conscience, especially in those serious, true, and great terrors which are described in the psalms and the prophets, and which those certainly taste who are truly converted, be able to decide whether it fears God for His own sake, or is fleeing from eternal punishments?

In his 1537 Smalcald Articles, Martin Luther argued against the Catholic doctrine of imperfect contrition, arguing that "such contrition was certainly mere hypocrisy, and did not mortify the lust for sins; for they had to grieve, while they would rather have continued to sin, if it had been free to them." Instead he argued that "repentance is not piecemeal," and "In like manner confession, too, cannot be false, uncertain, or piecemeal."

=== Qualities ===
In accord with Catholic tradition, contrition, whether perfect or imperfect, must be interior, supernatural, universal, and sovereign.

==== Interior ====
Contrition must be real and sincere sorrow of heart.

==== Supernatural ====
In accordance with Catholic teaching, contrition ought to be prompted by God's grace and aroused by motives that spring from faith, as opposed to merely natural motives, such as loss of honour, fortune, and the like (Chemnitz, Exam. Concil. Trid., Pt. II, De Poenit.). In the Old Testament, it is God who gives a "new heart" and puts a "new spirit" into the children of Israel (Ezek. 36:25–29); and for a clean heart, the Psalmist prays in the Miserere (Ps. 51, 11 sqq.). Peter told those to whom he preached in the first days after Pentecost that God the Father had raised up Christ "to give repentance to Israel" (Acts, v, 30 sq.). Paul, in advising Timothy, insists on dealing gently and kindly with those who resist the truth, "if peradventure God may give them full repentance" (2 Timothy, 2:24–25). In the days of the Pelagian heresy Augustine insisted on the supernaturalness of contrition, when he writes, "That we turn away from God is our doing, and this is the bad will; but to turn back to God we are unable unless He arouse and help us, and this is the good will." Some of the Scholastic doctors, notably Scotus, Cajetan, and after them Suarez (De Poenit., Disp. iii, sect. vi), asked speculatively whether man if left to himself could elicit a true act of contrition, but no theologian ever taught that what makes for forgiveness of sin in the present economy of God could be inspired by merely natural motives. On the contrary, all the doctors have insisted on the absolute necessity of grace for contrition that disposes to forgiveness (Bonaventure, In Lib. Sent. IV, dist. xiv, Part I, art. II, Q. iii; also dist. xvii, Part I, art. I, Q. iii; cf. Thomas, In Lib. Sent. IV). In keeping with this teaching of the Scriptures and the doctors, the Council of Trent defined: "If anyone says that without the inspiration of the Holy Spirit and without His aid a man can repent in the way that is necessary for obtaining the grace of justification, let him be anathema."

==== Universal ====
True contrition must extend to, at the very least, all mortal sins committed and not just a select convenient few. This doctrine is intimately bound up with the Catholic teaching concerning grace and repentance. There is no forgiveness without sorrow of soul, and forgiveness is always accompanied by God's grace. Grace cannot coexist with sin, and, as a consequence, one sin cannot be forgiven while another remains for which there is no repentance.

The prophet Joel urged men to turn to God with their whole heart (Joel 2:12-19), and Christ tells the doctor of the law that we must love God with our entire mind and strength (Luke 10:27). Ezekiel insists that a man must "turn from his evil ways" if he wish to live (Ezekiel 33:11).

The Scholastics inquired into this question when they asked whether or not there must be a special act of contrition for every serious sin and whether, to be forgiven, one must remember at the moment all grievous transgressions. To both questions, they answered in the negative, judging that an act of sorrow, which implicitly included all one's sins, would be sufficient.

==== Sovereign ====
According to Mark 8:35–37, Jesus admonished his disciples: "For those who want to save their life will lose it, and those who lose their life for my sake and for the sake of the gospel will save it. For what will it profit them to gain the whole world and forfeit their life? Indeed, what can they give in return for their life?" Contrition for sin must take precedence over temporal concerns. When the envoys of the Empress Eudoxia threatened John Chrysostom, he responded, "Go tell the princess that Chrysostom fears only one thing, and that is sin."

=== Sacrament of Penance ===
Contrition is not only a moral virtue, but the Council of Trent defined it is a "part" and, even more, quasi-materia in the Sacrament of Penance. "The (quasi) matter of this sacrament consists of the acts of the penitent himself, namely, contrition, confession, and satisfaction. These, inasmuch as they are by God's institution required in the penitent for the integrity of the sacrament and for the full and perfect remission of sin, are for this reason called parts of penance." In consequence of this decree of Trent theologians teach that sorrow for sin must be in some sense sacramental. La Croix went so far as to say that sorrow must be aroused with a view of going to confession, but this seems to be asking too much; most theologians think with Schieler-Heuser (Theory and Practice of Confession, p. 113) that it is sufficient if the sorrow coexist in any way with the confession and is referred to it. Hence the precept of the Roman Ritual, "After the confessor has heard the confession he should try by earnest exhortation to move the penitent to contrition" (Schieler-Heuser, op. cit., p. 111 sqq.). For repentance is essential for the effectiveness of this sacrament, as the Catechism of the Catholic Church explains:

Jesus' call to conversion and penance ... does not aim first at outward works ... but at the conversion of the heart, interior conversion (1430). Interior repentance is a radical reorientation of our whole life, a return, a conversion to God with all our heart, an end of sin, a turning away from evil, ... the desire and resolution to change one's life, with hope in God's mercy and trust in the help of his grace (1431).

For Catholics, where there is mortal sin, use of the Sacrament of Reconciliation must follow.

==== Perfect contrition without the Sacrament of Penance ====
Early Church Fathers, including Clement of Rome, Hermas, and Chrysostom, held that sorrow was effective for the remission of sins. Similarly, Scholastics such as Peter Lombard, Thomas Aquinas, and Bonaventure taught that perfect contrition, with the desire of receiving the Sacrament of Penance, restored a sinner to grace at once. Later theologians came to emphasize the desire for the sacrament of penance over the sorrow itself, with the Council of Trent declaring that "though contrition may sometimes be made perfect by charity and may reconcile men to God before the actual reception of this holy sacrament, still the reconciliation is not to be ascribed to the contrition apart from the desire for the sacrament which it includes."

In Catholic theology, perfect contrition is held to forgive sins due to its connection with love. Bede writes: "What is love but fire; what is sin but rust? Hence it is said, many sins are forgiven her because she hath loved much, as though to say, she hath burned away entirely the rust of sin, because she is inflamed with the fire of love." Accordingly, Gregory XIII condemned Baius's proposition 32, which asserted "that charity which is the fullness of the law is not always conjoined with forgiveness of sins".

Catholic theologians argue that it was possible to recover grace after sinning under the Old Covenant, citing Ezech. 33:11 ("As I live, saith the Lord God, I have no pleasure in the death of the wicked; but that the wicked turn from his way and live.") They reason that the coming of Christ and the institution of the sacrament of penance could not have increased the difficulty of obtaining forgiveness. Therefore, equating this turning to God with perfect contrition, they conclude that the same method must still be effective.

Several Catholic theologians have discussed what forms of love are sufficient to obtain justification. The general consensus is that pure, or disinterested, love (amor benevolentiæ, amor amicitiæ) is effective, and purely selfish love (amor concupiscentia) is not. There is not a general consensus on what motives can constitute perfect love. Some theologians hold that perfect love requires loving God for his great goodness alone; others argue that the love of gratitude (amor gratitudinis) suffices.

=== Obligation of eliciting the act of contrition ===
In the very nature of things the sinner must repent before being reconciled with God (Sess. XIV, ch. iv, de Contritione, Fuit quovis tempore, etc.). Therefore, whoever falls into grievous sin must either make an act of perfect contrition or supplement the imperfect contrition by receiving the Sacrament of Penance; otherwise reconciliation with God is impossible. This obligation urges under pain of sin when there is danger of death. In danger of death, therefore, if a priest be not at hand to administer the sacrament, the sinner must make an effort to elicit an act of perfect contrition. The obligation of perfect contrition is also urgent whensoever one has to exercise some act for which a state of grace is necessary and the Sacrament of Penance is not accessible. Theologians have questions how long a person may remain in the state of sin, without making an effort to elicit an act of perfect contrition. They seem agreed that such neglect must have extended over considerable time, but what constitutes a considerable time they find it hard to determine (Schieler-Hauser, op. cit., pp. 83 sqq.). Probably the rule of St. Alphonsus Liguori will aid the solution: "The duty of making an act of contrition is urgent when one is obliged to make an act of love" (Sabetti, Theologia Moralis: de necess. contritionis, no. 731; Ballerine, Opus Morale: de contritione).

== In other Christian theology ==
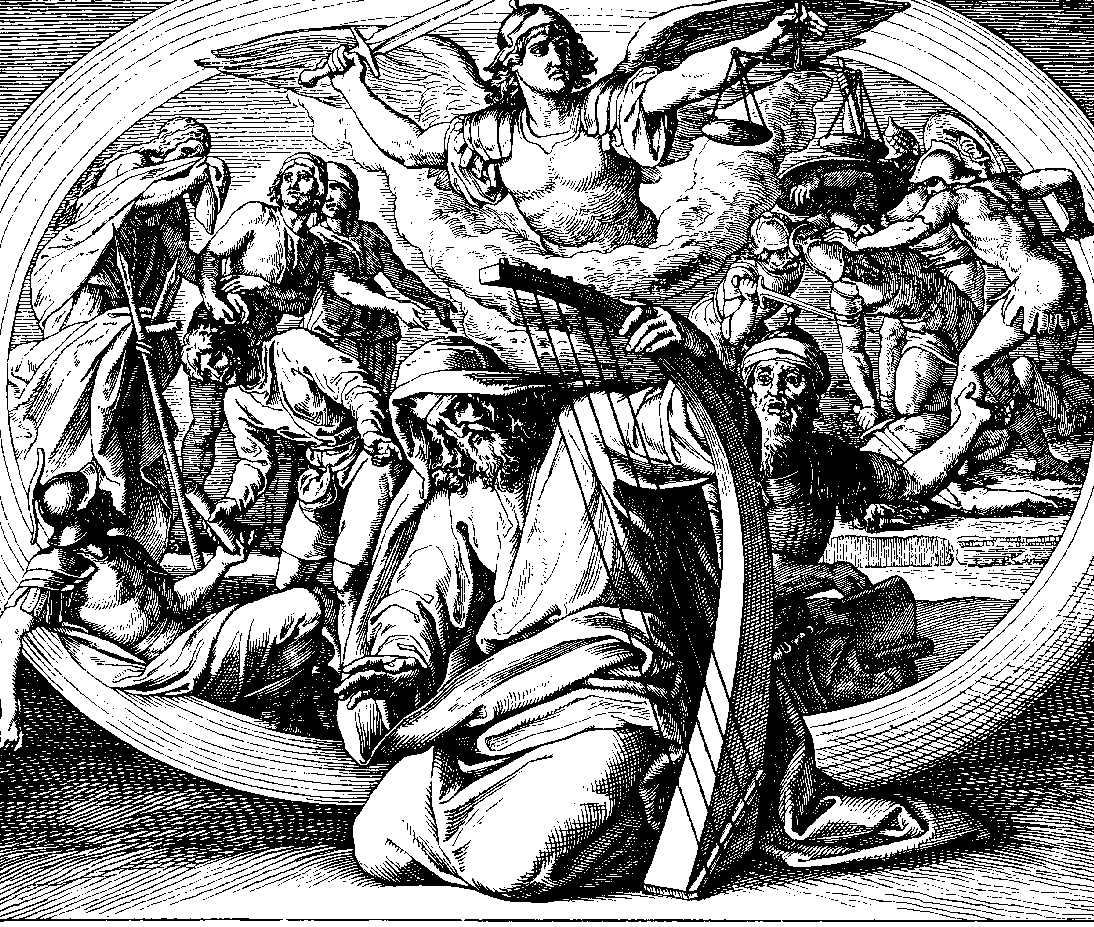
David is depicted giving a penitential psalm in this 1860 woodcut by Julius Schnorr von Karolsfeld, a Lutheran

The Augsburg Confession, the primary confession of faith of the Lutheran Church, divides repentance into two parts: "One is contrition, that is, terrors smiting the conscience through the knowledge of sin; the other is faith, which is born of the Gospel, or of absolution, and believes that for Christ's sake, sins are forgiven, comforts the conscience, and delivers it from terrors."

Puritan preacher Thomas Hooker defined contrition as "nothing else, namely, when a sinner by the sight of sin and vileness of it, and the punishment due to the same, is made sensible of sin, and is made to hate it, and hath his heart separated from the same."

Anglo-Catholic rector of St. Mark's Church in Philadelphia, Alfred Garnett Mortimer, pointed out that "feelings" are not an adequate gauge of contrition. The signs of true contrition are a readiness to confess, a readiness to amend one's life and avoid temptation, and a readiness to forgive others.

== See also ==
- Act of Contrition
- Atonement (governmental view)
- Forgiveness
- Mercy
- Pardon
- Ordo salutis
- Regeneration (theology)
- Sacrament of Penance
