= List of apologies made by Pope John Paul II =

Pope John Paul II made many apologies. During his long reign as Pope, he apologized to Jews, women, people convicted by the Inquisition, and almost everyone who had suffered at the hands of the Catholic Church over the years. Even before he became the Pope, he was a prominent editor and supporter of initiatives like the Letter of Reconciliation of the Polish Bishops to the German Bishops from 1965. As Pope, he officially made public apologies for over 100 of these wrongdoings, including:

- In 1992, he apologized to the indigenous people of South America for the "pain and suffering" caused during the Church's 500-year presence in the Americas. He issued a broader apology in 2000, acknowledging the church's "sins of the past" during the Jubilee year. In 1993 he apologized for missionary abuses against aborigines in Oceania.
- Christians involved in the African slave trade (14 August 1985, also at various points in the 1990s)
- In a June 1995, "Letter to Women", John Paul said,
  "Women's dignity has often been unacknowledged and their prerogatives misrepresented; they have often been relegated to the margins of society and even reduced to servitude...Certainly it is no easy task to assign the blame for this, considering the many kinds of cultural conditioning which down the centuries have shaped ways of thinking and acting. And if objective blame, especially in particular historical contexts, has belonged to not just a few members of the Church; for this I am truly sorry."
- The inactivity and silence of many Catholics during the Holocaust (16 March 1998). The Commission for Religious Relations with the Jews issued a statement:
  We cannot know how many Christians in countries occupied or ruled by the Nazi powers or their allies were horrified at the disappearance of their Jewish neighbours and yet were not strong enough to raise their voices in protest. For Christians, this heavy burden of conscience of their brothers and sisters during the Second World War must be a call to penitence.
- Cardinal Miloslav Vlk of Prague was instrumental in crafting an apology by John Paul II for the "cruel death" of the famed medieval Czech reformer Jan Hus in 1415. In his 18 December 1999 speech in Prague, John Paul expressed "deep sorrow" for Hus' death and praised his "moral courage."
- The Church's role in the religious wars that followed the Protestant Reformation.
- For the Crusaders' Sack of Constantinople in 1204. To the Archbishop Christodoulos of Athens he said "Some memories are especially painful, and some events of the distant past have left deep wounds in the minds and hearts of people to this day. I am thinking of the disastrous sack of the imperial city of Constantinople, which was for so long the bastion of Christianity in the East. It is tragic that the assailants, who had set out to secure free access for Christians to the Holy Land, turned against their own brothers in the faith. The fact that they were Latin Christians fills Catholics with deep regret. How can we fail to see here the mysterium iniquitatis at work in the human heart?".
- On 20 November 2001, from a laptop in the Vatican, Pope John Paul II sent his first e-mail apologizing for the Catholic sex abuse cases and the Church-backed "Stolen Generations" of Aboriginal children in Australia. The month before that, he apologised to China for the behavior of Catholic missionaries in colonial times.

In December 1999, at the request of Joseph Cardinal Ratzinger, then Prefect of the Congregation for the Doctrine of the Faith who would later become Pope Benedict XVI, the International Theological Commission presented its study on the topic Memory and Reconciliation: The Church and the Faults of the Past. The purpose of this document is "not to examine particular historical cases but rather to clarify the presuppositions that ground repentance for past faults." It examines repentance for past faults in the context of sociology, ecclesiology and theology.

The Great Jubilee of the year 2000 included a day of Prayer for Forgiveness of the Sins of the Church on March 12, 2000.

== See also ==
- Galileo affair
- Catholic Church and Nazi Germany
