= Sin of omission =

Type of sin

In Christianity, a sin of omission is a sin committed by willingly not performing a certain action. The theology behind a sin of omission derives from James 4:17, which teaches "Anyone, then, who knows the right thing to do and fails to do it, commits sin." Its opposite is the sin of commission, i.e. a sin resulting from an action performed.

== Catholicism ==
In the Catholic view, a sin of omission is a failure by a person to take an action that one "ought to do", and that is within ones power, and when attentively and willfully done, it is considered to be a sin. Like sins of commission (sins resulting from actions performed), the extent to which guilt is afforded by a particular sin of omission is determined by the extent of deliberation involved in the act, and by the magnitude of the precept and the dignity of the virtue that the omission opposes.

=== Definition ===
Sin of omission, in Catholic teaching, is, as Joseph Delaney states in the Catholic Encyclopedia (1911),

the failure to do something one can and ought to do. If this happens advertently and freely a sin is committed. [...] The degree of guilt incurred by an omission is measured like that attaching to sins of commission, by the dignity of the virtue and the magnitude of the precept to which the omission is opposed as well as the amount of deliberation.

A person may be guilty of a sin of omission if—as Joseph Delaney states in the Catholic Encyclopedia (1911)—"he fails to do something which he is unable to do" and which he ought to do, because he has put himself into a state or situation whereby he cannot complete the action. For example, if a person chooses to drink to excess and is therefore unable to perform a necessary task, he is responsible for that failure, even though he is physically unable to perform the task, because he knowingly put himself into a state (drunkenness) where accomplishing the task was impossible.

== Lutheranism ==
In Lutheran theology, a sin of omission is defined as "a certain illicit positive act, either an internal act of the will, as, for example, to will to omit what had been commanded, or an external act, as an operation by which any one is hindered from that which he ought to do; yet such a positive act is not always or necessarily required, but the mere fact that one does not do what is commanded is sin."

In contrast, "Sins of commission are positive acts, by which the negative precepts of God are violated."

== See also ==
- Lying by omission
- Omission (law)
- Omission bias
