= Sins that cry to Heaven for Vengeance =

Specific sins

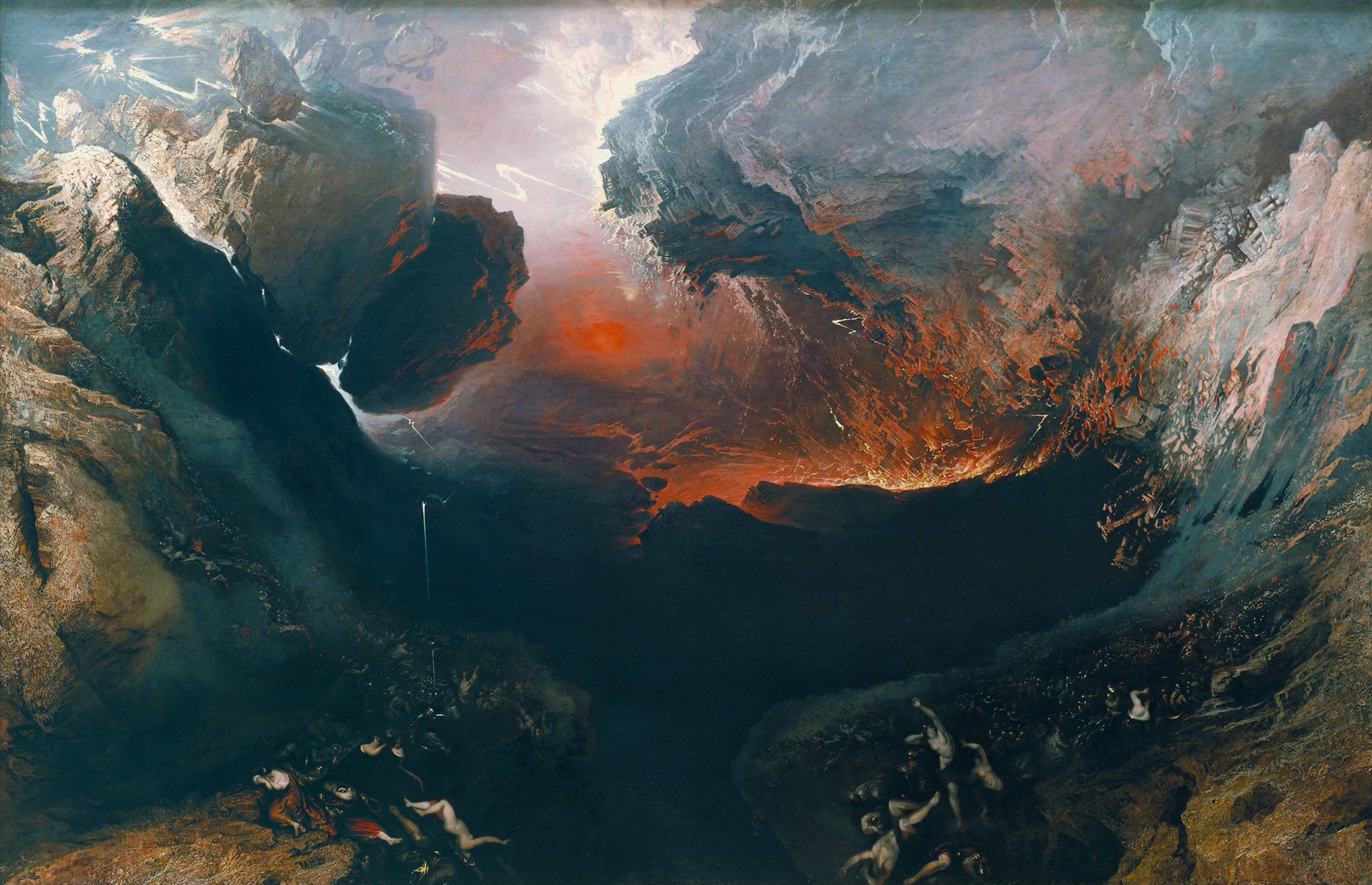
The Great Day of His Wrath, an 1851–1853 oil painting on canvas by the English painter John Martin.

In Christian hamartiology, the sins that cry to Heaven for Vengeance (Latin: peccata clamantia, lit. 'screaming sins') are four specific sins which are listed by the Bible.

While the Bible only refers to specific acts by Biblical characters as "crying to Heaven for Vengeance", in Western Christianity, these references are expanded upon and treated as establishing a category of particularly serious sins. Along with the seven deadly sins and the eternal sins, the sins that cry to Heaven for Vengeance are the most serious transgressions against the Law of Christ.

== Catholic Church ==
The expression is referenced in the Jewish Bible, particularly in Genesis 4:10 ("The Lord said to Cain [...] the voice of thy brother's blood crieth to me from the earth"), Genesis 18:20–21, Exodus 22:21–23, and Deuteronomy 24:14–15. The sins are numbered as being either four or seven; they are listed in the Catechisms as follows:

- The "blood of Abel": homicide, infanticide, fratricide, patricide, and matricide
- The "sin of the Sodomites": (cf. Jude 1:7).
- The "cry of the people oppressed in Egypt, the cry of the foreigner, the widow, and the orphan": oppression of the poor.
- The "injustice to the wage earner": taking advantage of and defrauding workers (cf. James 5:4).

Laurence Vaux's 1583 work, A Catechisme of Christian Doctrine, explains them as follows:

The first is voluntary or willful manslaughter. How the innocent blood of Abel cried from the earth to God and how Cain was punished, it is evident.

The second is sodomoticial sin: man with man, or woman with woman, against nature. How the cry of this most abominable sin came to God from the earth, and how God poured down fire and brimstone to destroy the wicked Sodomites, it appereath plain in scripture. This terrible example putteth in remembrance that perpetually to burn in hell with fire and brimstone is a punishment due for them that commit sin against nature.

The third is oppression of the poor, fatherless children, and widows. How God punished Pharaoh and the Egyptians for oppressing the Israelites, the scripture doth show. Oppressors cannot escape God's vengeance.

The fourth sin that crieth to God for vengeance is to keep back the wages of the hired servant or workman when he hath done his service or work.

Tom Hoopes of Benedictine College explicates the sins that cry to heaven for vengeance with respect to modern political thought:

The first two "sins that cry to heaven" include sins that one brand of politics downplays. First is abortion, which St. John Paul II compared to "the blood of Abel." Second is the "sin of the Sodomites," which the New Testament defines this way: "Sodom and Gomorrah and the surrounding towns gave themselves up to sexual immorality and perversion" (Jude 1:7). The second two sins are those that another brand of politics downplays: First, the plight of refugees, immigrants and those who need social assistance and, second, "injustice to the wage earner." The Catechism cites the New Testament to explain what kind of "wage earner" it means: "Behold, the wages you withheld from the workers who harvested your fields are crying aloud, and the cries of the harvesters have reached the ears of the Lord of hosts" (James 5:4).

The sins that cry to Heaven for Vengeance are referenced in the Douay Catholic Catechism of 1649, a compendium of Catholic doctrine. The concept is present in Catholic moral theology.

== Reformed churches ==
Reformed theologian William M'Gavin opined that "the four sins that cry to heaven for vengeance; these are, wilful murder—sin of Sodom—oppression of the poor—to defraud servants of their wages" are greater in gravity than the seven deadly sins.

== Other interpretations ==
Many churches, particularly ones considered progressive, understand the "sin of Sodom" to be oppression of the poor, in light of Ezekiel 16:49–50 ("This was the guilt of your sister Sodom: she and her daughters had pride, excess of food, and prosperous ease, but did not aid the poor and needy").

== See also ==
- Blasphemy against the Holy Ghost
- Consistent life ethic
- Moloch
- Seven deadly sins
- Salvation in Christianity
- The Sheep and the Goats
