= Venial sin =

Sin that does not result in eternal damnation in Hell

According to Catholicism and Lutheranism, a venial sin is a lesser sin that does not result in a complete separation from God and eternal damnation in Hell as an unrepented mortal sin would. A venial sin consists in acting as one should not, without the actual incompatibility with the state of grace that a mortal sin implies; they do not break one's friendship with God, but injure it.

== Definition ==
According to the Catechism of the Catholic Church:

1862 One commits venial sin when, in a less serious matter, he does not observe the standard prescribed by the moral law, or when he disobeys the moral law in a grave matter, but without full knowledge or without complete consent.

The definition of the word "venial" is "forgivable". An act, when it is not ordered towards that which is good, is considered to be sinful – either venially or mortally. When such an act is venially sinful, it entails subject-matter that is not considered to be "grave". Such an action, even if it is committed with full knowledge and full consent, remains venial, so long as the subject-matter of the act is not serious. If the subject-matter of a given act is "grave", however, the commission of that act may be mortally sinful. Intentional ignorance and "hardness of heart" increase "the voluntary character of a sin". Thus, in discussing the distinction between venial and mortal sin in his Summa Theologica, St. Thomas Aquinas indicated that a venial sin differs from a mortal sin, in the same way that something imperfect differs from something that is perfect.

As such, one can arrive at what kind of sin, for example, was committed, by asking the following three questions:

1. Did the act involve a grave matter?
2. Was the act committed with full knowledge of the wrongdoing that had been done in the act?
3. Was the act done with full consent of the will?

If all three questions are answered in the affirmative, the criteria for a mortal sin have been met. If any one of the three questions is answered in the negative, only the criteria for a venial sin have been met.

Each venial sin that one commits adds to the penance that one must do. Penance left undone during life contributes to the purifying process one must undergo while in the state of Purgatory. A venial sin can be left unconfessed so long as there is some purpose of amendment. One receives from the sacrament of reconciliation the grace to help overcome venial, as well as mortal sins. It is recommended that confession of venial sins be made. Venial sins require some kind of penance.

Catholics believe that followers should not take venial sin lightly, especially when committed deliberately. No one without a special grace (generally taken to apply only to the Virgin Mary) can avoid even semi-deliberate venial sins entirely (according to the definition of Trent). But to avoid mortal sins followers must seek (as far as possible) to overcome venial sins. The Magisterium says that although a number of venial sins do not themselves add up to a mortal sin, each venial sin weakens the will further, and the more willing one becomes in allowing such falls, the more one is inclined towards and will inevitably fall into mortal sins if one continues along this path.

In Lutheranism, sins are of two classes:

As to their effect, sins are divided into mortal sins and venial sins. Mortal sins are those which result in the death of the sinner. This term takes in all the sins of the unbelievers. In the case of the believers those sins are called mortal which force the Holy Spirit to depart from one's heart, which destroy faith. Venial sins are sins which, though they in themselves merit eternal death, are daily forgiven to the believer. They are also called sins of weakness. They do not drive the Holy Spirit from the heart, do not extinguish faith.

Venial sins are sins of weakness; they are limited to believers, and do not kill faith, because they are not done intentionally. In themselves they are real sins and are worthy of death, but through faith Christians have forgiveness for them. Mortal sins are such as kill faith and drive the Holy Spirit from the heart, because no man can sin willfully intentionally and at the same time believe in Christ for the forgiveness of his sins.

== See also ==
- Contrition
- Perfect contrition
- Original sin
- Catholic hamartiology
