= Sola gratia =

Christian theological doctrine

Sola gratia, meaning by grace alone, is one of the five solae and consists in the belief that salvation comes by divine grace or "unmerited favor" only, not as something earned or deserved by the sinner. It is a Christian theological doctrine held by some Protestant Christian denominations, in particular the Lutheran and Reformed traditions of Protestantism, propounded to summarise the Protestant Reformers' basic soteriology during the Reformation. In addition, salvation by grace is taught by the Catholic Church: "By the grace of God, we are saved through our faith; this faith entails by its very nature, good works, always enabled by prior grace, without which this faith is dead."

== History ==
The Catholic Church teaches salvation by grace alone in contradistinction with salvation by faith alone:

The Catholic Church teaches that good works done after regeneration (at baptism) and justification are (if certain conditions are met) meritorious and can contribute to salvation and attainment of eternal life, but only hand-in-hand with, soaked in, enabled by, grace, which alone saves us. Catholics believe in sola gratia. It's a faith that is not separated from works (per James). Faith inherently includes these works. But we’re not saved by faith alone (that’s where Protestantism errs); we're saved by grace alone. We may describe Catholic soteriology as follows: By the grace of God, we are saved through our faith; this faith entails by its very nature, good works, always enabled by prior grace, without which this faith is dead.

During the Protestant Reformation, Lutheran and Calvinist theologians generally believed that the Catholic doctrine of the means of grace was a mixture of reliance upon the grace of God and confidence in the merits of one's own works performed in love, pejoratively called "legalism". These Reformers posited that salvation is entirely comprehended in God's gifts (that is, God's act of free grace), dispensed by the Holy Spirit according to the redemptive work of Jesus Christ alone.

Consequently, they argued that a sinner is not accepted by God on account of the change wrought in the believer by God's grace, and indeed, that the believer is accepted without any regard for the merit of his works—for no one deserves salvation; at the same time, they condemned the extreme of antinomianism, a doctrine that argues that if someone is saved, he/she has no need to live a holy life, given that salvation is already "in the bag". It is also linked to the five points of Calvinism.

The Eastern Orthodox Churches affirm salvation by grace, teaching:

So we, as Orthodox Christians, affirm as clearly and unambiguously as any Lutheran, for example, that "salvation is by grace" and not by our works. Unlike medieval Catholicism, Orthodoxy does not hold that a person can build up a "treasury of merits" that will count in our favor at the Judgment Seat of Christ. What will matter then is our having surrendered our sin to God through confession, and our gestures of love (Mt. 25), together with the unshakable conviction that "Jesus Christ is Lord," and the unique Way to eternal life.

Being synergists, those of Wesleyan–Arminian soteriology, such as Methodists, take a different approach to sola gratia than Lutherans and Reformed Christians, holding that God, through prevenient grace, reaches out to all individuals though they have the free will to cooperate with that grace or reject it.

=== Recent activity ===
In November 1999, the Lutheran World Federation and the Pontifical Council for Promoting Christian Unity issued the "Joint Declaration on the Doctrine of Justification" that said, "By grace alone, in faith in Christ's saving work and not because of any merit on our part, we are accepted by God and receive the Holy Spirit, who renews our hearts while equipping us and calling us to good works".

On July 18, 2006, delegates to the World Methodist Conference voted unanimously to adopt the declaration. The Methodists' resolution said the 1999 agreement "expresses a far-reaching consensus in regard to the theological controversy which was a major cause of the split in Western churches in the 16th century" about salvation.

Some conservative Protestants still believe the differences between their views and those of the Catholics remain substantial, however. They insist that this agreement does not fully reconcile the differences between the Reformist and Catholic viewpoints on this subject.

== See also ==
- Christian views on the Old Covenant
- Conditional security
- Expounding of the Law
- Imparted righteousness
- Irresistible grace
- Justification (theology)
- Law and Gospel
- Paul the Apostle and Jewish Christianity
- Sanctification in Christianity
