= Sola fide =

Christian theological doctrine

Sola fide, meaning "by faith alone", is a Protestant Christian doctrine (Note: For Catholic sources, see; for Protestant sources, see) that teaches sinners are justified through Justifying faith—apart from good works or religious deeds. Protestants traditionally believe that this doctrine of salvation is the cornerstone of Christianity, the very teaching "upon which the church stands or falls".

In classical Protestant theologies, works are the natural evidence of faith, but they do not determine salvation. Confessional Lutheranism sees justification as free forgiveness, received only through faith. Without faith, God's forgiveness is rejected and its benefits are forfeited. Methodism affirms the doctrine of justification by faith alone, but holds that holy living with the goal of Christian perfection (entire sanctification) is essential for salvation; maintenance of sanctification is contingent on continual faith in and obedience to God. In contrast to classical Protestant theology, Free Grace theology sees justification as being received through a single act of faith that guarantees eternal security independent of personal perseverance, though they may experience temporal discipline from God. In this view, good works are not necessary proofs of salvation but rather the ground of our degree of eternal reward.

Anabaptist theology categorically rejects the Lutheran and Reformed doctrine of sola fide, and instead emphasizes a "faith that works"; Anabaptists teach that "justification [began] a dynamic process by which the believer partook of the nature of Christ and was so enabled to live increasingly like Jesus."

Unlike the Protestant teaching of faith apart from works, Catholicism teaches that salvation is by faith and works, holding to the concept of fides formata—faith formed by charity. Catholic theology emphasizes that faith must be accompanied by personal "merit" and the "observance of the commandments". (Note: In Catholic theology, however, Baptism is neither Human Works nor Works of the Law.) Eastern Orthodoxy shares a similar view, teaching that salvation requires both faith and the sinner's active cooperation.

== Origin of the term ==
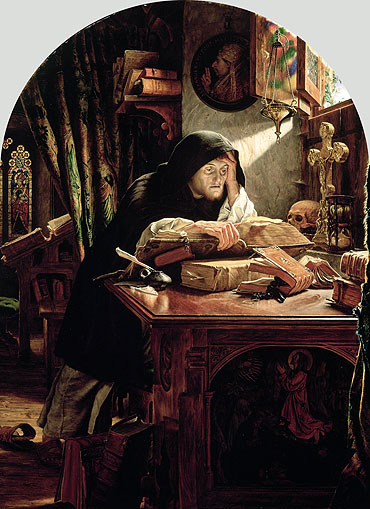
1861 painting of Luther discovering the Sola fide doctrine at Erfurt

Although modern Catholic scholars are against Luther's use of the word "only", Catholic sources before the Reformation had done the same. In 1916, Lutheran scholar Theodore Engelder published an article titled "The Three Principles of the Reformation: Sola Scriptura, Sola Gratia, Sola Fides" ("only scripture, only grace, only faith").

=== Martin Luther ===
Martin Luther elevated sola fide to the principal cause of the Protestant Reformation, the rallying cry of the Lutheran cause, and the chief distinction of the Lutheran and Reformed branches of Christianity from Roman Catholicism.

Luther added the word allein ("alone" in German) to Romans 3:28 controversially so that it read: "So now we hold, that man is justified without the help of the works of the law, alone through faith". The word "alone" does not appear in the Greek manuscripts and Luther acknowledged this fact, but he defended his translation by maintaining that the adverb "alone" was required by idiomatic German:

I knew very well that the word solum ["alone" in Latin] is not in the Greek or Latin text (…) It is a fact that these four letters S O L A are not there (…) At the same time (…) it belongs there if the translation is to be clear and vigorous. I wanted to speak German, not Latin or Greek, since it was German I had undertaken to speak in the translation. But it is the nature of our German language that in speaking of two things, one of which is affirmed and the other denied, we use the word solum (allein) along with the word nicht [not] or kein [no]. For example, we say, 'The farmer brings allein [only] grain and kein [no] money.

Luther further claimed that sola was used in theological traditions before him and this adverb makes Paul's intended meaning clearer:

I am not the only one, nor the first, to say that faith alone makes one righteous. There was Ambrose, Augustine and many others who said it before me. And if a man is going to read and understand St. Paul, he will have to say the same thing, and he can say nothing else. Paul's words are too strong – they allow no works, none at all! Now if it is not works, it must be faith alone.

=== Translations ===
Historically, the Sola fide expression has appeared in several Catholic Bible translations

- The Nuremberg Bible (1483), translates a phrase in Galatians 2:16 as "nur durch den glauben" ("only through faith").
- Italian translations from 1476, 1538, and 1546 render it as "solo per la fede" or "per la sola fede" ("only by faith").
- La Sacra Bibbia, an Italian translation of 1943, translates Galatians 2:16: "solo per la fede di Gesù Cristo" ("only through faith in Jesus Christ").
- The Jerusalem Bible, a French edition of 1956, translates Galatians 2:16: "seulement par la foi en Jésus Christ" ("only through faith in Jesus Christ").
- Dios Habla Hoy (DHH, "God Speaks Today"), a Spanish translation approved by the Latin American and Caribbean Episcopal Council (CELAM) in 1979, translates Galatians 2:16: "únicamente por creer en Jesucristo" ("only through faith in Jesus Christ").
- Good News Translation Catholic Edition (GNTCE) translates Romans 3:28 and Galatians 2:16 respectively "we conclude that a person is put right with God only through faith" and "Yet we know that a person is put right with God only through faith in Jesus Christ".
- The Catholic Bible published in 1974 and 2008 by the Italian Episcopal Conference (La Sacra Bibbia della Conferenza Episcopale Italiana or Bibbia CEI) renders Galatians 2:16 with the phrase: "soltanto per mezzo della fede" ("only through faith"). (Note: Similar Sola Fide expression, under Benedict XVI's papacy, can also be found in)
- Revised Standard Version Catholic Edition (RSVCE) translates Romans 11:20, in the section God's Universal Salvation, as: "That is true. They were broken off because of their unbelief, but you stand fast only through faith."
- Both New Revised Standard Version — Anglicised Catholic Edition (NRSVACE) and New Revised Standard Version — Catholic Edition (NRSVCE) translate Romans 11:20, on The Salvation of the Gentiles, as "That is true. They were broken off because of their unbelief, but you stand fast only through faith."

The "faith alone" expression also appears in at least nine modern English Bible translations:

- Amplified Bible (AMP)
- Amplified Bible, Classic Edition (AMPC)
- God's Word Translation (GW)
- Good News Translation (GNT)
- Living Bible (TLB)
- The Message (MSG)
- Names of God Bible (NOG)
- The Voice (VOICE)
- Weymouth New Testament (WNY)

== History ==
In his survey of the use of the phrase sola fide from the Church Fathers to before Reformation, theologian Christopher Mooney notes that the term was used both positively ("How gratuitously and generously God extends salvation to sinners who come to Christ in faith, without the need of antecedent works, especially of the Mosaic Law") and negatively ("as expressing an empty, presumptuous faith lacking repentance or good conduct.")

=== Ante-Nicene Church ===
The Baptist writer Thomas Schreiner notes that as justification was not a major debated issue in the Early Church, it was often not discussed in great detail. However, he notes that while later authors such as Augustine explicitly spoke of justification in terms of infused righteousness, it is possible to argue that others in the Early Church spoke of justification in more forensic terms that may be understood as mirroring the later concept of sola fide. Although he wrote that earlier authors such as Origen (185-253) do not seem to clearly teach sola fide, he still noted that in particular, Clement of Rome, the Odes of Solomon and the Epistle to Diognetus in its emphasis on the substitutionary nature of the "great exchange" may be read as viewing justification in a more forensic light, although there exists controversy in how authors such as Clement of Rome should be understood in their views of justification.

==== Clement of Rome ====
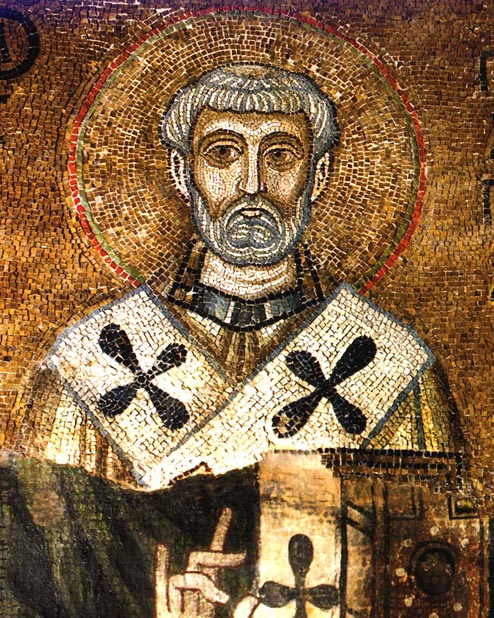
It is often argued that Clement of Rome is a witness to the doctrine of faith alone. However there is much controversy about his views

Schreiner notes that within the earliest writers, we do not have many references to justification, however a notable statement is made by Clement of Rome, as he wrote:

And so we, having been called through His will in Christ Jesus, are not justified through ourselves or through our own wisdom or understanding or piety or works which we wrought in holiness of heart, but through faith, whereby the Almighty God justified all men that have been from the beginning; to whom be the glory for ever and ever. Amen.

— 1 Clement 32:4)

Clement's view on justification has caused much scholarly discussion, because Clement asserted: "we are not justified through ourselves, but through faith", but still emphasizing God's judgement upon wickedness. Some see Clement as believing in faith alone but that faith will lead into doing good works, while some others have argued that Clement held synergist views.

According to Protestant historian Philip Schaff faith alone was not clearly taught by most church fathers, except for Clement of Rome. In contrast, the Catholic Encyclopedia indicates that Clement of Rome held works to be meritorious and holding works to be a part of justification.

==== Odes of Solomon ====
In addition to the epistle of Clement, the Odes of Solomon have sometimes been cited as plausibly reflecting a forensic rather than transformative emphasis in its theory of justification, being underscored by a doctrine of election. According to Brian J. Arnold, the Odes tend to attribute justification to divine action apart from human merit, emphasizing that the means by which one is justified is faith.

==== Origen ====
Schreiner notes that while Origen sometimes emphasizes faith in justification, he nevertheless makes other statements which contradict the idea of justification by faith alone. Nevertheless, Origen (185 – c. 253) in his day mentioned individuals who denied any future judgement based on works. He refers to them in his commentary on Romans 10:9. While not considered heretical to him, he rejected their views, emphasizing that faith must be expressed through the actions of believers to be meaningful.

==== Shepherd of Hermas ====
The Shepherd of Hermas (2nd century) has a synergist understanding of soteriology, with him holding that good works and faith are part of one's justification. For Hermas baptism is necessary to be saved and warns those who undergo baptism by the danger of postbaptismal sins. The Shepherd of Hermas possibly supports delaying baptism for practical reasons which is because of the fear of post-baptismal sins. According to Hermas, those who fall into sin after baptism have only one chance of penance.

=== Post-Nicene Church ===
Thomas Schreiner asserted that because justification was not a big issue in the patristic period, "thus the theology isn't always integrated or consistent". Although he observes that Augustine of Hippo (354 – 430) differs from the reformers in his understanding of justification as a transformative process rather than a forensic declaration, he nevertheless argued that authors such as Ambrosiaster had similarities to the views of justification as held by later Reformers:

"By faith alone one is freely forgiven of all sins and the believer is no longer burdened by the Law for meriting good works. Our works, however, are demonstrative of our faith and will determine whether we are ultimately justified"
—Ambrosiaster

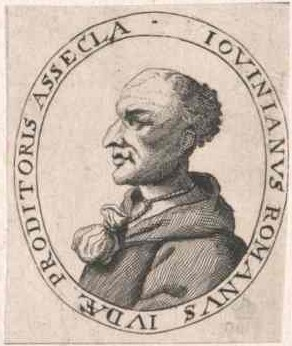
Jovinian has been argued to have taught similar views of justification as the Protestant reformers.

Jovinian, who was condemned in Milan in the 4th century over his criticism of ascetism has been argued to have held a view of justification close to the Reformers. He held that who are a part of the Church are in a permanent state of grace. Jovinian also limited the impossibility of relapse to the truly regenerate, thus his teaching on perseverance has affinities with Augustine's gift of perseverance and the Calvinist doctrine of perseverance of the saints. However Jovinian did not derive his view of eternal security from a doctrine of predestination, but instead from his denial of works having merit.

Forensic views of justification have been noted by D. H. Williams in the writings Marius Victorinus (4th century) and Hilary of Poitiers (4th century). Marius Victorinus wrote that our own merits do not justify us and that we are justified by faith alone, however works should follow from that faith. Hilary of Poitiers often contrasts salvific faith and salvation by works, which leads to unbelief, as he declared "salvation is entirely by faith". He also noted salvation to be by grace in the Old Testament and he saw Abraham as a model for the Jews, who was justified by faith.

Clement of Alexandria taught that faith was the basis of salvation, however he also believed that faith was also the basis of "gnosis" which for him mean spiritual and mystical knowledge.

==== Augustine ====
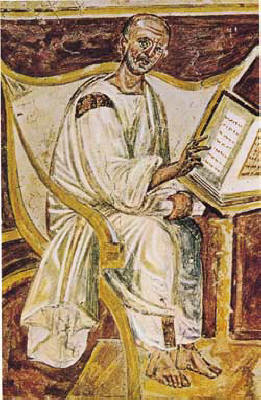
Augustine of Hippo

Although Augustine (354 – 28 August 430) divine monergism in election and emphasized the centrality of God's grace in salvation, he nevertheless did not hold to a forensic view of justification. Augustine held that justification occurred at baptism, which includes both ontological healing and remission of sins. In his view justification refers to being made righteous, including both the remission of sins and the infusing of the love of God into our hearts. Although Augustine did not believe that good works merit one's justification, as he held that only God's grace can bring one to salvation, his view of justification was centered around infused righteousness rather than forensic declaration.

However, according to Ken Wilson, Augustine criticized unnamed individuals who held to a stronger view of faith alone as espoused by free grace theologians. The individuals Augustine criticized held that one is saved by faith alone and that God's future judgement for Christians only consisted of temporal punishment and reward; hell was out of question. Thus, they held that deeds such as repentance and good works were not necessary to enter heaven.

=== Medieval ===
Early medieval thinkers whose statements on faith that have been interpreted as preceding Luther's include Gottschalk (c. 808 – 868 AD), Claudius of Turin (8.–9. century AD) Some have argued that Ildefonsus and Julian of Toledo believed that faith alone was sufficient for salvation, Julian of Toledo made statements such as "all effort of human argument must be suspended where faith alone is sufficient".

Protestants also have claimed that the writings of Bernard of Clairvaux include the doctrine of justification by faith alone.

According to Mooney, in the medieval period "sola fide did not have a single meaning. Most commonly it meant the denial of the necessity of meritorious works prior to justification. On this point, all agree: works cannot make the unrighteous become righteous. Only faith can. Hence, sola fide is used to describe the moment of justification or instances where the believer lacks the chance to perform good works."

==== Pre-Reformation ====
The doctrine of faith alone precedes Martin Luther in the theologies of many so-called proto-Protestant reformers: Wessel Gansfort (1419–1489), Jacques Lefèvre d'Étaples (c. 1455 – 1536), and possibly also in Johann Pupper (c. 1400 – 1475). The doctrine of sola fide also seems to be supported in the doctrine of John Wycliffe (c. 1328 – 1384), as he frequently denied the ideas of merit within the Roman Catholic system, emphasizing the sufficiency of the meditation of Christ in his soteriology. Wycliffle additionally stated: "Trust wholly in Christ; rely altogether on his sufferings; beware of seeking to be justified in any other way than by his righteousness. Faith in our Lord Jesus Christ is sufficient for salvation.".

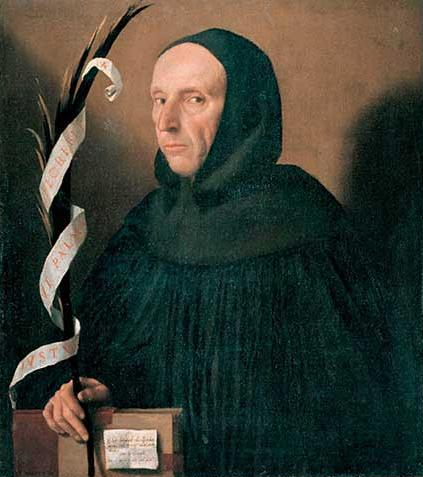
Girolamo Savonarola (1452 – 23 May 1498)

According to some historians Luther's view on the doctrine of sola fide was influenced by the Italian reformer Girolamo Savonarola, as while he did not fully formulate the doctrine of sola fide, he in many ways prefigured Luther's theology of justification in his own development of his understanding of divine grace, writing:

It is untrue that God’s grace is obtained by pre-existing works of merit as though works and deserts were the cause of predestination. On the contrary, these are the result of predestination. Tell me, Peter; tell me, O Magdalene, wherefore are ye in paradise? Confess that not by your own merits have ye obtained salvation, but by the goodness of God — Girolamo Savonarola

Other quotes from Savonarola such as "Not by their own deservings, O Lord, or by their own works have they been saved, lest any man should be able to boast, but because it seemed good in Thy sight." made Martin Luther say that even though the theology of Savonarola wasn't perfect, it was still an example of true Christian theology. Martin Luther later stated about Savonarola:

Christ canonizes Savonarola through us even though popes and papists burst to pieces over it — Martin Luther

== Centrality in the doctrine of the Protestant Reformation ==
The doctrine of sola fide asserts that God's pardon for guilty sinners is granted to and received through faith alone, excluding all "works" (good deeds). Without God's input, mankind, Christianity asserts, is fallen and sinful, meaning its actions and omissions are afflicted by the curse and most if not all would face God's wrath due to the fall of man (which spelt the end of Eden). God, the faith holds, sent his only Son in human form, to be reborn in all mankind so through Jesus Christ alone (solus Christus) sinners may receive justification, which is granted solely through faith.

Christ's righteousness, according to the followers of sola fide, is imputed (or attributed) by God to sinners coming to a state of true, loving belief (as opposed to infused or imparted). If so God's verdict and potential pardon is from genuinely held Christian faith (or in a few more liberal sects, all of Christ's principles) rather than anything in the sinner. This contrasts with other supposed means of grace, such as priestly confession and rituals such as weekly taking of the sacrament. See the ordo salutis for more detail on the doctrine of salvation considered more broadly than justification by faith alone.

The standalone sola fide justification of souls is a tenet of the Lutheran and Reformed churches but neither the Roman Catholic nor the Eastern Orthodox churches affirm it. These Protestant traditions exclude all human works (except the works of Jesus Christ, which form the basis of justification) from the legal verdict (or pardon) of justification. According to Martin Luther, justification by faith alone is the article on which the Church stands or falls. Thus, "faith alone" is foundational to Lutheranism and Reformed Christianity, and as a formula distinguishes it from other Christian denominations.

=== Faith ===
Within Classical Protestantism, it is generally accepted that there is 4 kinds of faith; Historical, Miracle-working, Temporary, Justifying.

Historical Faith is described by Louis Le Blanc as a faith which is restricted to "theoretical intellect" which lacks penetration of the heart, those who have this faith may believe in everything contained in the Scriptures, but they are not moved by this knowledge, it can be summarised as a bare assent to the truth of Christianity.

Miracle-working Faith is defined by William Forbes as a faith which produces signs which instead of being hope and belief, becomes an assurance of the truth. Robert Bellarmine denies any distinction between Miracle-working faith and Historical faith however the Greek Fathers do admit a difference between it.

Temporary Faith is summarised by William Forbes as that which is possessed for a time until temptation when it falls away, it is of the same genus as Justifying Faith and so those who have Temporary Faith are for a time truly justified, this distinction is not rejected by all Calvinists as Richard Baxter does teach the loss of salvation to those who do not persevere, though not every Protestant affirms this.

Justifying Faith is unable to be defined in one strict category as various Schools have interpreted Justifying faith differently within Protestantism. Protestants accept at the very least that the object of the faith is the revealed Word of God, and the subject is the intellect, in which case it is no different to Historical Faith, however Justifying faith has a distinct form to Historical Faith.

=== Lutheran theology ===
From 1510 to 1520, Martin Luther lectured on the Book of Psalms and the Pauline epistles to the Galatians, Hebrews, and Romans. As he studied these portions of the Bible, he came to view the use of terms such as penance and righteousness by the Roman Catholic Church in new ways (see Genesis 15:6, Galatians 3:1–7, Romans 4:1–5). He became convinced that the Roman Catholic Church was corrupt in its ways and had lost sight of what he saw as several of the central truths of Christianity, the most important of which, for Luther, was the doctrine of justification—God's act of declaring a sinner righteous—by faith alone through God's grace. Therefore, he began to teach that salvation or redemption is a gift of God's grace, attainable exclusively through faith in Jesus Christ.

"This one and firm rock, which we call the doctrine of justification," insisted Luther, "is the chief article of the whole Christian doctrine, which comprehends the understanding of all godliness." He also called this doctrine the articulus stantis et cadentis ecclesiae ("article of the standing and falling church"): "if this article stands, the Church stands; if it falls, the Church falls." For Lutherans this doctrine is the material principle of theology in relation to the Bible, which is the formal principle. They believe justification by grace alone through faith alone in Christ's righteousness alone is the gospel, the core of the Christian faith around which all other Christian doctrines are centered and based.

Luther came to understand justification as entirely the work of God. When God's righteousness is mentioned in the gospel, it is God's action of declaring righteous the unrighteous sinner who has faith in Jesus Christ. The righteousness by which the person is justified (declared righteous) is not his own (theologically, proper righteousness) but that of another, Christ (alien righteousness). "That is why faith alone makes someone just and fulfills the law," said Luther. "Faith is that which brings the Holy Spirit through the merits of Christ." Thus faith, for Luther, is a gift from God, and "a living, bold trust in God's grace, so certain of God's favor that it would risk death a thousand times trusting in it." This faith grasps Christ's righteousness and appropriates it for the believer. He explained his concept of "justification" in the Smalcald Articles:

The first and chief article is this: Jesus Christ, our God and Lord, died for our sins and was raised again for our justification (Romans 3:24–25). He alone is the Lamb of God who takes away the sins of the world (John 1:29), and God has laid on Him the iniquity of us all (Isaiah 53:6). All have sinned and are justified freely, without their own works and merits, by His grace, through the redemption that is in Christ Jesus, in His blood (Romans 3:23–25). This is necessary to believe. This cannot be otherwise acquired or grasped by any work, law or merit. Therefore, it is clear and certain that this faith alone justifies us. ... Nothing of this article can be yielded or surrendered, even though heaven and earth and everything else falls (Mark 13:31).

— Martin Luther, "The Smalcald Articles" in Concordia: The Lutheran Confessions, Part 2, Article 1

Traditionally, Lutherans have taught forensic (or legal) justification, a divine verdict of acquittal pronounced on the believing sinner. God declares the sinner to be "not guilty" because Christ has taken his place, living a perfect life according to God's law and suffering for his sins. For Lutherans, justification is in no way dependent upon the thoughts, words, and deeds of those justified through faith alone in Christ. The new obedience that the justified sinner renders to God through sanctification follows justification as a consequence, but is not part of justification.

Lutherans believe that individuals receive this gift of salvation through faith alone. Saving faith is the knowledge of, acceptance of, and trust in the promise of the Gospel. Even faith itself is seen as a gift of God, created in the hearts of Christians by the work of the Holy Spirit through the Word and Baptism. Faith is seen as an instrument that receives the gift of salvation, not something that causes salvation. Thus, Lutherans reject the "decision theology" which is common among modern evangelicals, such as Baptists and Methodists.

For Lutherans, justification provides the power by which Christians can grow in holiness and do good works (cf. Sanctification in Christianity#Lutheranism). Such improvement comes about in the believer only after he has become a new creation in Christ through Holy Baptism. This improvement is not completed in this life: Christians are always "saint and sinner at the same time" (simul iustus et peccator)—saints because they are holy in God's eyes, for Christ's sake, and do works that please him; sinners because they continue to sin until death.

=== Reformed theology ===
The Reformed tradition, which includes the Continental Reformed, Presbyterian, Reformed Anglican and Congregationalist denominations, upholds the doctrine of sola fide.

At present, the Reformed tradition includes different theological views, including Auburn Avenue Theology (Federal Vision Theology), which distinguishes between initial justification by faith alone and final justification "through faith and works or faith and faithfulness". Likewise, in the sacrament of baptism, Auburn Avenue Theology holds that "all the benefits of Christ (i.e., election, effectual calling, regeneration, faith, union with Christ, and adoption) are given but must be retained by grace and cooperation with grace."

=== Anglican theology ===
At the time of the Protestant Reformation in England, Thomas Cranmer, the architect who shaped the foundational Anglican formularies—The Thirty-nine Articles of Religion, Books of Homilies and Book of Common Prayer—"fully integrated justification sola fide et sola gratia into the doctrine and worship of the Church of England."

Ecclesiastical historian and theologian Gerald Bray states:

The doctrine of justification by faith alone was the central teaching of the Lutheran Reformation and is fully accepted by Anglicans. Apart from anything else, it is a guarantee that everyone is saved equally—there is no special reward for those who do more (or better) works than others.

Cranmer's "Homily on Salvation", which was regularly read in every parish of the Church of England, "make the Protestant understanding of justification normative for Anglican doctrine (Articles 9-14, 17, 22)."

=== Faith and works ===
While salvation cannot be achieved through works (Titus 3:5), faith being a unity with Christ in the Spirit naturally issues in love (Galatians 5:6). This was Martin Luther's emphasis likewise.

In relation to sola fide, the place of works is found in the second chapter of the Epistle to the Ephesians: Justification is by grace through faith, "not from yourselves" and "not by works". In other words, it is by faith alone since all human efforts are excluded here (Ephesians 2:8–9). Ephesians goes on to say that every person who has faith is to produce good works, according to God's plan (Ephesians 2:10). These works, however, are not a cause of forgiveness but a result of forgiveness. Faith alone justifies but faith is never alone. It is followed by works. In short, works of love are the goal of the saving faith (1 Timothy 1:5).

According to the Defense of the Augsburg Confession of Philipp Melanchthon, the Epistle of James clearly teaches that the recipients of the letter have been justified by God through the saving Gospel (James 1:18):

Thirdly, James has spoken shortly before concerning regeneration, namely, that it occurs through the Gospel. For thus he says James 1:18: Of His own will begat He us with the Word of Truth, that we should be a kind of first-fruits of His creatures. When he says that we have been born again by the Gospel, he teaches that we have been born again and justified by faith. For the promise concerning Christ is apprehended only by faith, when we set it against the terrors of sin and of death. James does not, therefore, think that we are born again by our works.

In answer to a question on James 2:24 ("you see that a person is justified by what he does and not by faith alone"), the Wisconsin Evangelical Lutheran Synod has written: "In James 2, the author was dealing with errorists who said that if they had faith they didn't need to show their love by a life of faith (2:14–17). James countered this error by teaching that true, saving faith is alive, showing itself to be so by deeds of love (James 2:18, 26). The author of James taught that justification is by faith alone and also that faith is never alone but shows itself to be alive by good deeds that express a believer's thanks to God for the free gift of salvation by faith in Jesus Christ."

According to the Defense of the Augsburg Confession again,

James, therefore, did not believe that by good works we merit the remission of sins and grace. For he speaks of the works of those who have been justified, who have already been reconciled and accepted, and have obtained remission of sins.

In Article XX of Good Works, the Augsburg Confession states that:

[I]t is taught on our part that it is necessary to do good works, not that we should trust to merit grace by them, but because it is the will of God. It is only by faith that forgiveness of sins is apprehended

The Lutheran Churches teach that God does reward good works done by Christians; the Apology of the Augsburg Confession teaches: "We also affirm what we have often said, that although justification and eternal life go along with faith, nevertheless, good works merit other bodily and spiritual rewards and degrees of reward. According to 1 Corinthians 3:8, 'Each will receive his wages according to his labor.'"

Martin Luther, who opposed antinomianism, is recorded as stating, "Works are necessary for salvation but they do not cause salvation; for faith alone gives life."

In his Introduction to Romans, Luther stated that saving faith is,

a living, creative, active and powerful thing, this faith. Faith cannot help doing good works constantly. It doesn't stop to ask if good works ought to be done, but before anyone asks, it already has done them and continues to do them without ceasing. Anyone who does not do good works in this manner is an unbeliever...Thus, it is just as impossible to separate faith and works as it is to separate heat and light from fire!

Scottish theologian John Murray of Westminster Theological Seminary in Philadelphia, asserted:

"Faith alone justifies but a justified person with faith alone would be a monstrosity which never exists in the kingdom of grace. Faith works itself out through love (Gal. 5:6). And Faith without works is dead (James 2:17–20)."

"It is living faith that justifies and living faith unites to Christ both in the virtue of his death and in the power of his resurrection. No one has entrusted himself to Christ for deliverance from the guilt of sin who has not also entrusted himself to him for deliverance from the power of sin."

Contemporary evangelical theologian R. C. Sproul writes:

The relationship of faith and good works is one that may be distinguished but never separated ... if good works do not follow from our profession of faith, it is a clear indication that we do not possess justifying faith. The Reformed formula is, "We are justified by faith alone but not by a faith that is alone."

Michael Horton concurs by saying:

This debate, therefore, is not over the question of whether God renews us and initiates a process of gradual growth in holiness throughout the course of our lives. 'We are justified by faith alone, but not by a faith that is alone,' Luther stated, and this recurring affirmation of the new birth and sanctification as necessarily linked to justification leads one to wonder how the caricatures continue to be perpetuated without foundation.

== Reconciliation of differing emphases ==
Christian theologies answer questions about the nature, function, and meaning of justification quite differently. These issues include: Is justification an event occurring instantaneously or is it an ongoing process? Is justification effected by divine action alone (monergism), by divine and human action together (synergism), or by human action (erroneously called Pelagianism)? Is justification permanent or can it be lost? What is the relationship of justification to sanctification, the process whereby sinners become righteous and are enabled by the Holy Spirit to live lives pleasing to God?

Discussion in the centuries since the Reformation and in some ways liberalising Counter-Reformation has suggested that the differences are in emphasis and concepts rather than doctrine, since Catholic and Orthodox Christians concede works are not the basis of justification nor relatedly salvation, and most Protestants accept the need for repentance and the primacy of grace (see § Lutheran World Federation and the Roman Catholic Church and § Lutheran-Orthodox Joint Commission below). Further, many Protestant churches actually hold more nuanced positions such as sola gratia, sola fide or justification by faith (i.e. without the alone). According to a 2017 survey conducted in Western Europe by the Pew Research Center, "fewer people say that faith alone (in Latin, sola fide) leads to salvation, the position that Martin Luther made a central rallying cry of 16th-century Protestant reformers." Protestants in every country surveyed except Norway are more likely to say that both good deeds and faith in God are necessary for salvation.

The Joint Declaration on the Doctrine of Justification (JDDJ), signed by both the Lutheran World Federation and the Roman Catholic Church on 31 October 1999 declares:

We confess together that good works—a Christian life lived in faith, hope and love—follow justification and are its fruits. When the justified live in Christ and act in the grace they receive, they bring forth, in biblical terms, good fruit. Since Christians struggle against sin their entire lives, this consequence of justification is also for them an obligation they must fulfill. Thus both Jesus and the apostolic Scriptures admonish Christians to bring forth the works of love.

The Joint Declaration on the Doctrine of Justification (JDDJ), signed by the Lutheran World Federation and the Catholic Church, says that "sinners are justified by faith in the saving action of God in Christ. ... Such a faith is active in love and thus the Christian cannot and should not remain without works." And later, "Good works—a Christian life lived in faith, hope and love—follow justification and are its fruits. When the justified live in Christ and act in the grace they receive, they bring forth, in biblical terms, good fruit. Since Christians struggle against sin their entire lives, this consequence of justification is also for them an obligation they must fulfill. Thus both Jesus and the apostolic Scriptures admonish Christians to bring forth the works of love."

The Joint Declaration never mentions the expression Sola Fide and the Catechism of the Catholic Church clearly teaches that salvation is obtained by a combination of both faith and good works, which are considered to be a human response to God's prior and continuing grace.

=== Epistle of James and Pauline Epistles ===
Chapter 2 of the Epistle of James, verses 14–26, discusses faith and works, starting with verse 14, "What use is it, my brothers, if someone says he has faith but he has no works? Can that faith save him?" In verse 17 it says, "Even so faith, if it has no works, is dead by itself". It concludes in verse 26 by saying "For just as the body without the spirit is dead, so also faith without works is dead."

The Defense of the Augsburg Confession rejects the idea that the Epistle of James contradicts the Lutheran teaching on Justification.

He who has faith and good works is righteous, not indeed, on account of the works, but for Christ's sake, through faith. And as a good tree should bring forth good fruit, and yet the fruit does not make the tree good, so good works must follow the new birth, although they do not make man accepted before God; but as the tree must first be good, so also must man be first accepted before God by faith for Christ's sake. The works are too insignificant to render God gracious to us for their sake, if He were not gracious to us for Christ's sake. Therefore James does not contradict St. Paul, and does not say that by our works we merit, etc.

Confessional Lutheran theologians summarize James 2: "we are justified/declared righteous by people when they see the good works we do as a result of our faith and they conclude that our faith is sincere."

In answer to another question on James 2:24 as well as Romans 3:23–24, the Wisconsin Evangelical Lutheran Synod replied:

Paul is writing to people who said that faith in Jesus alone does not save a person, but one has to also obey God's law in order to be justified (Gal 3:3, 5:4). To counter the false idea that what we do in keeping the law must be added to faith in what Christ did for us. Paul often emphasizes in his letters (esp. Galatians, Romans, Colossians) that we are saved by grace through faith alone. James is writing to people who felt that believing in Jesus saved a person, but that having faith did not mean that a person necessarily would keep God's commandments out of love for God (James 2:14, 17). To show that faith is not really faith unless it leads a person to thank God for salvation in a life of glad and willing obedience to God's holy will. James emphasized that a faith which did not show that it was living faith was really not faith at all.

A Lutheran exegesis further points out that James is simply reaffirming Jesus' teaching in Matthew 7:16, and that in the tenth verse of the same chapter ("For whoever keeps the whole law and yet stumbles at just one point is guilty of breaking all of it"), James too denies works as a means to obtain forgiveness:

James here (verse 10) also shoots down the false doctrine of work-righteousness. The only way to be free of sin is to keep the law perfectly and in its entirety. If we offend it in the slightest, tiniest little way, we are guilty of all. Thank God that He sent Jesus to fulfill the Law in its entirety for us

Lutheran and Reformed Protestants, as well as others, base the sola fide on the fact that the New Testament contains almost two hundred statements that appear to imply that faith or belief is sufficient for salvation, for example: "Jesus said unto her, I am the resurrection, and the life: he that believeth in me, though he were dead, yet shall he live." (John 11:25) and especially Paul's words in Romans, "Therefore we conclude that a man is justified by faith without the deeds of the law." (Romans 3:28)

"Now to him that worketh is the reward not reckoned of grace, but of debt. But to him that worketh not, but believeth on him that justifieth the ungodly, his faith is counted for righteousness." (Romans 4:4–5)

The precise relationship between faith and good works remains an area of controversy in some Protestant traditions (see also Law and Gospel). Even at the outset of the Reformation, subtle differences of emphasis appeared. For example, because the Epistle of James emphasizes the importance of good works, Martin Luther sometimes referred to it as the "epistle of straw". Calvin on the other hand, while not intending to differ with Luther, wrote of the necessity of good works as a consequence or 'fruit' of faith. The Anabaptists tended to emphasize a "faith that works".

A recent article suggests that the current confusion regarding the Epistle of James about faith and works resulted from Augustine of Hippo's anti-Donatist polemic in the early fifth century. This approach reconciles the views of Paul and James on faith and works. Recent meetings of scholars and clergy have attempted to soften the antithesis between Protestant and Catholic conceptions of the role of faith in salvation, which, if they were successful, would have far reaching implications for the relationship between most Protestant churches and the Catholic Church. These attempts to form a consensus are accepted among many Protestants and Catholics, but among others, sola fide continues to divide the Reformation churches, including many Lutherans, Reformed, and others, from other denominations. Some statements of the doctrine are interpreted as a denial of the doctrine as understood by other groups.

Views on Salvation
Tradition	Process or Event	Type of Action	Permanence	Justification & Sanctification
Roman Catholic	Process	Synergism	Can be lost via mortal sin	Part of the same process of Divinization
Lutheran	Event	Divine monergism	Can be lost via loss of faith or mortal sin	Justification is separate from and occurs prior to sanctification
Methodist	Event	Synergism	Can be lost through sin or via a loss of faith	Salvation is dependent on upon both justification and sanctification
Eastern Orthodox	Process	Synergism	Can be lost through sin	Part of the same process of theosis
Reformed	Event	Divine monergism	Cannot be lost	Both are a result of union with Christ
Free grace	Event	Synergism	Cannot be lost, not even in cases of apostasy or carnal living	Sanctification is not guaranteed nor necessary for salvation, however it is necessary for eternal rewards.

== Catholic view ==
The alternate Catholic formulation to sola fide is fides formata, a faith formed by love. An apologist has noted that Catholic theology typically does not treat justification independently from sanctification as Protestant theology does, however on questions of certainty it does treat faith and hope as distinct, unlike Protestant theology which traditionally combines them.

In the Council of Trent (1545–1563), the Catholic Church cautioned against an extreme version of sola fide in canon XIV on self-righteousness and justification without repentance, declaring: "If any one says, that man is truly absolved from his sins and justified, because that he assuredly believed himself absolved and justified; or, that no one is truly justified but he who believes himself justified; and that, by this faith alone, absolution and justification are effected; let him be anathema."

Pope Benedict XVI summarized the Catholic position as "...Luther's phrase: "faith alone" is true, if it is not opposed to faith in charity, in love. Faith is looking at Christ, entrusting oneself to Christ, being united to Christ, conformed to Christ, to his life. ... St Paul speaks of faith that works through love (cf. Gal 5: 14)."

The following principles from the Catechism of the Catholic Church (labeled by paragraph number) are useful for understanding the Catholic view of justification.

- 1989. Justification is not only the remission of sins, but also the sanctification and renewal of the interior man.
- 1990. Justification detaches man from sin which contradicts the love of God, and purifies his heart of sin.
- 1991. With justification, faith, hope, and charity are poured into our hearts, and obedience to the divine will is granted us.
- 1992. Justification has been merited for us by the Passion of Christ who offered himself on the cross as a living victim, holy and pleasing to God, and whose blood has become the instrument of atonement for the sins of all men.
- 1993. Justification establishes cooperation between God's grace and man's freedom. On man's part it is expressed by the assent of faith to the Word of God, which invites him to conversion, and in the cooperation of charity with the prompting of the Holy Spirit who precedes and preserves his assent.
- 1996. Our justification comes from the grace of God.
- 2007. With regard to God, there is no strict right to any merit on the part of man.
- 2010. Since the initiative belongs to God in the order of grace, no one can merit the initial grace of forgiveness and justification, at the beginning of conversion. Moved by the Holy Spirit and by charity, we can then merit for ourselves and for others the graces needed for our sanctification, for the increase of grace and charity, and for the attainment of eternal life.
- 2011. The charity of Christ is the source in us of all our merits before God. Grace, by uniting us to Christ in active love, ensures the supernatural quality of our acts and consequently their merit before God and before men.

Thus the Catholic view could perhaps be interpreted as a progression or flow: first grace, then initial trust/repentance/conversion, then faith/hope/charity, combined with an emphasis that none of these elements should be isolated thus missing the package.

Further, the sacraments of baptism, Eucharist, and reconciliation relate to each: baptism for the removal of sin (in the case of an infant, original sin), Eucharist for the participation in Jesus' sacrifice, and penance for the confession of lapses of faith and charity and the assignment of prayers/actions to rejoin faith and charity. Sola fide is rejected only as far is it would ignore or reject grace or the New Commandment.

=== Grace ===
The Catholic view holds instead that grace, specifically, the form of grace known as "sanctifying grace", and which first floods the soul at baptism, which empowers one's ability both to believe and to perform good works, is essential as the gateway to salvation, but not the only element needed for salvation (Eph 2:8–10). God's freely given grace is offered and empowers one's ability to believe and to perform good works, both then becoming meritorious because they are joined to Christ's saving power of the Cross. (Phil 2:12–13) (Catechism of the Catholic Church, 1987–2029) A Christian must respond to this free gift of Grace from God given first, ordinarily, in Baptism (1 Pet 3:21) both by having faith and by living in the light of Christ through love (Jn 3:16; 1 Jn 1:7) (Galatians 5:6) which perfects the Christian throughout his or her life (James 2:22). The Catholic position is best summed up in John 3:16, if one has the proper, contextual understanding of the word "believe". "Believe", in context and in ancient Judaism, meant more than an intellectual assent. "To believe" also meant to obey, which is seen, in context, in Jn 3:36, 1 Jn 2:3ff, and 1 Jn 5:1ff. Without our positive response to grace offered, salvation is not possible.

As expounded in the Catechism of the Catholic Church, the Catholic Church's teaching is that it is the grace of God, "the free and undeserved help that God gives us to respond to his call", that justifies us, a grace that is a prerequisite for our free response of "collaboration in justification through faith, and in sanctification through charity".

=== Justification ===
According to the Catechism of the Catholic Church justification is conferred in baptism, the sacrament of faith. The sacrament of reconciliation enables recovery of justification, if lost through committing a mortal sin. A mortal sin makes justification lost, even if faith is still present.

The Council of Trent sought to clarify the Catholic Church's teaching on justification and the manner in which it differed from that proposed by Lutheran and Reformed Christians. It stated: "Faith is the beginning of human salvation, the foundation and root of all justification, without which it is impossible to please God (Hebrews 11:6) and to come to the fellowship of His sons; and we are therefore said to be justified gratuitously, because none of those things that precede justification, whether faith or works, merit the grace of justification." "Faith, unless hope and charity be added to it, neither unites man perfectly with Christ nor makes him a living member of His body. For which reason it is most truly said that faith without works is dead (James 2:17–20) and of no profit, and in Christ Jesus neither circumcision availeth anything nor uncircumcision, but faith that worketh by charity (Galatians 5:6)." After being justified, "to those who work well unto the end and trust in God, eternal life is to be offered, both as a grace mercifully promised to the sons of God through Christ Jesus, and as a reward promised by God himself, to be faithfully given to their good works and merits. ... Since Christ Jesus Himself, as the head into the members and the vine into the branches (John 15:1–6), continually infuses strength into those justified, which strength always precedes, accompanies and follows their good works, and without which they could not in any manner be pleasing and meritorious before God, we must believe that nothing further is wanting to those justified to prevent them from being considered to have, by those very works which have been done in God, fully satisfied the divine law according to the state of this life and to have truly merited eternal life, to be obtained in its [due] time, provided they depart [this life] in grace".

In its canons, the Council condemned the following propositions:

- man can be justified before God by his own works, whether done by his own natural powers or through the teaching of the law, without divine grace through Jesus Christ (canon 1);
- the sinner is justified by faith alone, meaning that nothing else is required to cooperate in order to obtain the grace of justification, and that it is not in any way necessary that he be prepared and disposed by the action of his own will (canon 9);
- the commandments of God are, even for one that is justified and constituted in grace, impossible to observe (canon 18);
- the justice received is not preserved and also not increased before God through good works, but those works are merely the fruits and signs of justification obtained, but not the cause of its increase (canon 24);
- the good works of the one justified are in such manner the gifts of God that they are not also the good merits of him justified; or the one justified by the good works that he performs by the grace of God and the merit of Jesus Christ, whose living member he is, does not truly merit an increase of grace, eternal life, and in case he dies in grace, the attainment of eternal life itself and also an increase of glory (canon 32).

=== Erasmus ===
In Catholic biblical scholar Erasmus's final fifth edition of his New Testament (1535), he made a lengthy word study of "sola fide" in relation to 1 Corinthians 3:2 and denied Luther's construal and insertion of "alone": when "sola is used in an expression such as sola fides, it means not 'apart from everything else' but 'pre-eminently.'"

Accordingly, whoever says we are justified by faith alone does not forthwith exclude charity or charitable works, but human philosophy, or the ceremonies and works of the Law, or the life lived before baptism, or something similar gathered from the context … In all his Epistles Paul nowhere separates charity from purifying faith.

— Erasmus, Annotations, 1535

=== Catholic exegesis of Letter of James ===
Catholic exegetes believe that St. James, to continue the thread above, had no other object than to emphasize the fact—already emphasized by St. Paul—that only such faith as is active in charity and good works (fides caritate formata) possesses any power to justify man (cf. Galatians 5:6; 1 Corinthians 13:2), whilst faith devoid of charity and good works (fides informis) is a dead faith and in the eyes of God insufficient for justification (cf. James 2:17 sqq.)

In response to sola fide, Robert Sungenis argues in his 1997 book Not by Faith Alone that:

1. Lutherans and Reformed Christians have devised many and varied explanations to neutralize the clear and unambiguous statement in Jm 2:24 that "man is justified by works and not by faith alone." Each of these explanations concludes that James is not teaching that man is justified by works in the same sense that Paul says man is justified by faith. Puzzled by James's language, Martin Luther even concluded that the epistle of James was a spurious book and should not be canonically authoritative for New Testament teaching.
2. Countering the Lutheran and Reformed Christian explanation of the epistle of James which states that James means that "men" witness Abraham's works, the Genesis text (Genesis 22) does not include any men as witness to Abraham's works, but only God himself.
3. Countering the Lutheran and Reformed Christian explanation of James which holds that the word "justified" as James uses the term refers to a "vindication", rather than to a salvific justification, as Paul uses the term, are the following arguments:
  - If James were teaching a concept of "vindication", he would have said, with the proper Greek word, "you see, a person is vindicated by works." Moreover, since James adds the clause "and not by faith alone" we know that he is correcting a false notion concerning the solitude of faith in justification, not suggesting that Abraham was vindicated by works.
  - If James were attempting to teach a vindication of Abraham, the specific argumentation he used would make sense only if James's opponents had claimed that Abraham was "vindicated by faith alone". In other words, if the vindication hypothesis were true, syntactical requirements would have forced James to use the meaning of "vindicated" in the first part of his argument (Jm 2:20–21) in order also to use it in the latter part (Jm 2:24). Since the grammatical structure of the verse would then require that the phrase "not by faith alone" have its referent in the phrase "is vindicated", this would force the meaning of the verse to be, "a person is vindicated ... not by faith alone"—a meaning that has no relevance to James's discussion.
  - The New Testament does not use the word "justified" in the sense of "vindicated" in contexts which are soteriological, i.e., contexts which discuss salvation or damnation. Moreover, such passages as Mt 11:19 where one could plausibly interpret the Greek word dikaioo as referring to a vindication do so only in a metaphorical sense; therefore they do not use dikaioo in the same way that James, and even Paul, use the term, which is historical and literal.
  - James's discussion of the events surrounding the justification of Rahab preclude assigning the meaning of "vindicated" to the word justified. Rahab's justification, as described in Jm 2:25, is a salvific justification, not a vindication, yet James specifies that Rahab was justified "in the same way" that Abraham was justified. Therefore, one cannot understand Abraham's justification as a vindication.
  - Since James and Paul use the same Greek noun dikaiosune ("righteous") in reference to Abraham, and interpret the word in the same way (cf. Gn 15:6, Rm 4:3, Jm 2:23), it would be totally incongruous for one of them to use a different meaning of its verbal cognate dikaioo in reference to Abraham.
  - The Lutherans and Reformed Christian position assumes that Abraham's justification is a once-for-all event. James's all important question "Can faith save him?" (Jm 2:14), however, includes Abraham within its purview. Hence we must conclude that if Abraham's works were not of the quality that James prescribes in the context (Jm 2:15), then Abraham would not be justified. Abraham could not be justified in a "once-for-all" event in Gn 15:6 and at the same time have that justification put in jeopardy by disobedience to James's requirement of works for justification. If this could happen, the question in Jm 2:14 would have no meaning.
4. Abraham's acts in Genesis 12, 15, and 22 were acts of faith and works. We should not misconstrue Paul's stress on Abraham's faith in his view of Gn 15:6 to say that Abraham performed no works of loving obedience to God at this time or prior, nor should we misconstrue James's view of works in Genesis 22 to say that Abraham's attempted sacrifice of Isaac was not a supreme act of faith. Similarly, Abraham's departure from his homeland in Genesis 12 also couples his faith and works in regard to justification. Throughout his life, in the periods recorded in Genesis 13–14, 16–21, and 23–25 which are between the times of his recorded faith and obedience in the New Testament, Abraham continued to live in faith and obedience, with only what we may call minor lapses along the way. Genesis 22's importance is its detailing of Abraham's quintessential act of the faith-and-works which allowed God to swear an oath of blessing to him and for all his future descendants. Abraham's act in Genesis 22, not Gn 15:6, was the most important act in Abraham's life. The act in Genesis 22 was just as much a crediting of righteousness to Abraham as that in Gn 15:6.
5. The entire context of the book of James concerns what one must do to be saved. He concentrates on obedience to the law as the means of salvation, and judgment for those who disobey that law.
6. James includes sins of commission as well as omission in his warning against disobedience to the law. The supreme law, or "royal law", that James has in view is the law of love.
7. James assumes that the audience to whom he writes already has faith in God. The main question that James poses to them is whether they have added works to their faith. James does not suggest that works will immediately or inevitably flow from one who has faith, even though he may have a greater disposition towards good works once he has faith. James teaches that one who has faith must make a daily, conscious decision to do good works, just as he must decide each day to refrain from sin. In fact, if he chooses not to do good works when the opportunity arises, he has sinned (Jm 4:17).
8. James does not support the Lutherans and Reformed Christian concept that one can be saved as long as he has "saving faith". James is not so much attempting to qualify the faith needed for justification as he is saying that one must consciously add works to faith in order to be justified. A person, to be justified, must persevere to his last breath in this conscious decision to add works to faith.
9. One of the most heinous in the catalogue of sins that James specifies is sin of the tongue. What is "said" to God and man is of the utmost importance to James and a major criterion on how the individual will be judged.
10. Both Paul and James speak of the works of love that one must add to his faith in order to be justified.
11. Like Paul, James concludes that if one chooses the system of law and desires God to evaluate him on that basis without the benefit of grace, he must then obey the whole law without fault. For one fault, the law will utterly condemn him.

== Anabaptist view ==
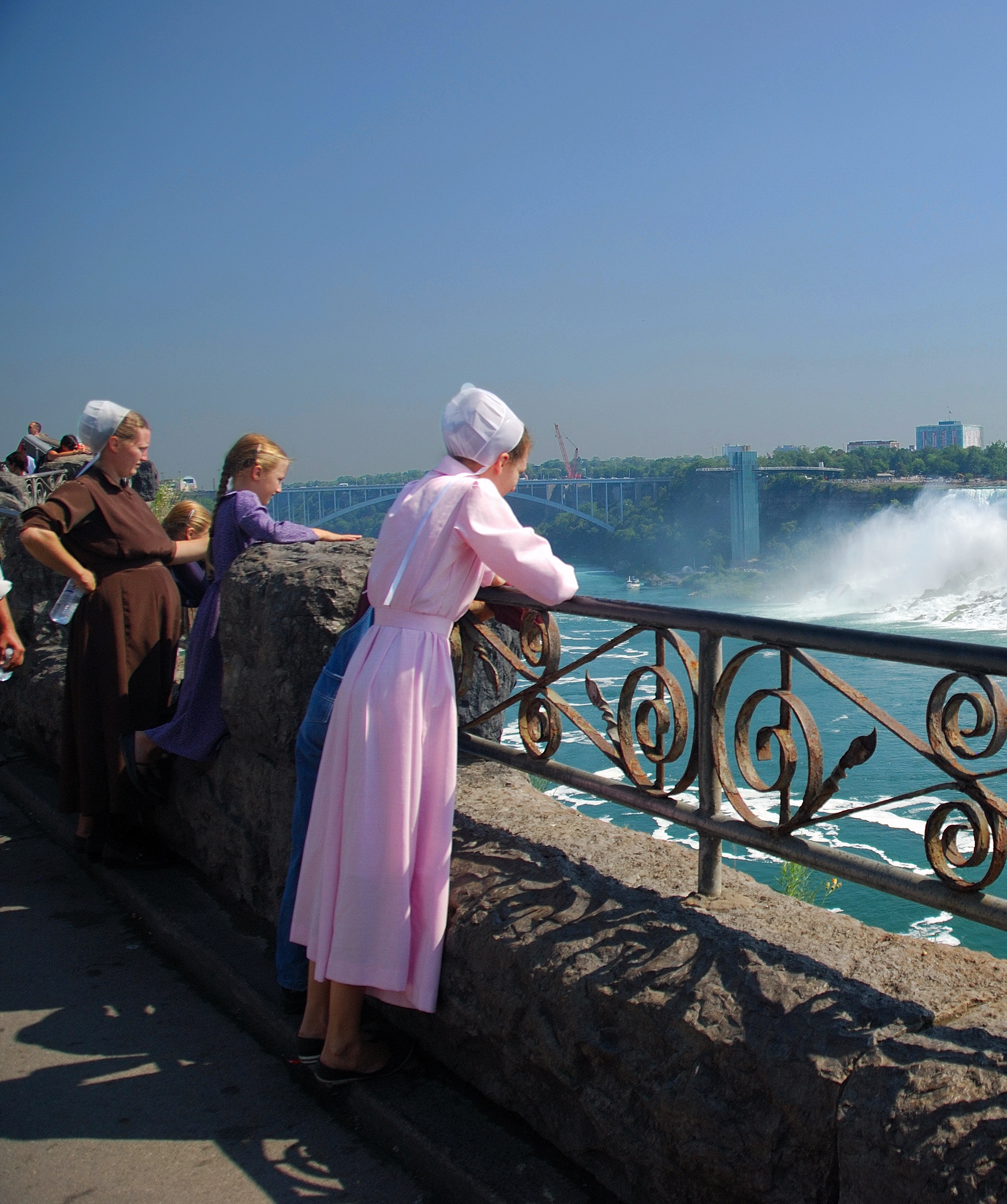
An Anabaptist Christian lady wearing a headcovering and cape dress in keeping with Anabaptist teachings on headship and modesty

Anabaptist cleric David Griffin writes:

For early Anabaptists, sola fide muted the call to imitate Christ by excusing anti-Christian behavior generally, and justifying violence towards fellow Christians in particular. True fide, it was argued, takes Christ both as savior and example. That is, faith is directed not just to the soteriological work of Christ's death, but also towards his exemplary human life. Faith accepts that because Christ's earthly life pleased God, it is normative for proper human experience. Consequently, early Anabaptism expected an affirmative answer to two basic questions: 1) "Do you believe that Christ bore your sins?" and 2) "Do you believe that Jesus' human life, which pleased God, should be copied?"

"The beginning of the Anabaptist path to salvation was thus marked not by a forensic understanding of salvation by 'faith alone', but by the entire process of repentance, self-denial, faith, rebirth and obedience. It was this process that was marked by the biblical sign of baptism." After becoming a believer, Anabaptist theology emphasizes "a faith that works".

Anabaptist denominations teach:

... salvation by faith through grace, but such faith must bear "visible fruit in repentance, conversion, regeneration, obedience, and a new life dedicated to the love of God and the neighbor, by the power of the Holy Spirit."

Hans Denck wrote:

To believe is to obey God's Word—be it unto death or life—in the sure confidence that it leads to the best. Hebrews 11:1

Obedience to Jesus and other New Testament teachings, loving one another and being at peace with others, and walking in holiness are seen as "earmarks of the saved." Good works thus have an important role in the life of an Anabaptist believer, with the teaching "that faith without works is a dead faith" (cf. James 2:26) occupying a cornerstone in Anabaptist Christianity. Anabaptists do not teach faith and works—in the sense of two separate entities—are necessary for salvation, but rather that true faith will always produce good works. Balthasar Hubmaier wrote that "faith by itself alone is not worthy to be called faith, for there can be no true faith without the works of love."

Anabaptists "dismissed the Lutheran doctrine of justification, a dead faith as they called it, which was unable to produce Christian love and good works." Peter Riedemann wrote:

These so-called Christians can be compared with the heathen who were led into the land of Israel by the Assyrian king and were settled in cities. The Lord sent lions among them to kill them, until a priest from Israel came and taught them the manner and practice of the law. Those heathen learned to serve the God of heaven. But they continued in their abominable practices. God was not pleased with their service, and their children followed in their footsteps. (2 Kings 17:18–34)

That is just what can be seen in the so-called Christians of today, especially the Lutherans. They continually profess to love and serve God and will not give up evil, sinful practices and the whole service of the devil. They continue to walk from generation to generation; as their fathers did, so do they, and even worse. John clearly states in what way they walk in truth! 1 John 2:4; 4:20

Rather than a forensic justification that only gave a legal change of one's status before God, early Anabaptists taught that "justification begun a dynamic process by which the believer partook of the nature of Christ and was so enabled to live increasingly like Jesus." Christians of the Anabaptist tradition (who teach salvation by "faith that works") have argued that being a disciple of Jesus by careful obedience to New Testament commands (such as the holy kiss, baptism, communion, headcovering, and feet washing), is "crucial evidence that an individual has repented, believed, and yielded to Christ." The Anabaptist theologian Menno Simons rebuffed the Lutheran charge of legalism by referencing John 14:15:

Because we teach from the mouth of the Lord that if we would enter into [eternal] life, we must keep the commandments; that the love of God is that we keep his commandments, the [Lutheran] preachers call us heaven-stormers and meritmen, saying that we want to be saved by our own merits even though we have always confessed that we cannot be saved by means of anything other than by the merits, intercession, death, and blood of Christ.

== Free grace view ==
Lewis Sperry Chafer (1871–1952) who was a major influence upon many free grace theologians.

The modern free grace movement originated primarily from the perspective of some faculty members at Dallas Theological Seminary, notably through the writings of Lewis Sperry Chafer (1871–1952) and the influential advocacy of Zane C. Hodges (1932–2008). It is commonly associated with the Lordship salvation controversy which began in the late 1970's to early 1980's.

It holds that things such as turning from sin, baptism or perseverance in the faith are not necessary for salvation, but instead hold that these things are necessary for eternal rewards. It holds eternal security, and denies that every believer will necessarily persevere. Thus, they hold that anyone who believes in Jesus Christ will go to heaven regardless of any future actions—including future sin, unbelief, or apostasy—though Christians who sin or abandon the faith will face God's discipline.

Free grace theology is distinguished by its treatment of the words "salvation" and "save" in the Bible. These theologians argue that there are many ways believers can experience "salvation", not necessarily referring to salvation from hell. This view cites verses such as Acts 27:34, where the Greek word σωτηρῐ́ᾱ sōtēríā—typically translated as 'salvation'—is translated "health" or "strength" because food will assist their deliverance from physical death. Spiritually, salvation is seen as referring to deliverance from the eternal penalty of sin (justification), the current power of sin over the Christian (sanctification), the removal of any possibility to sin (glorification), and being restored to stewardship over the world as God intended for humankind at creation (restoration to rule). Most Free Grace theologians hold that the one who possesses "dead faith"—as mentioned James 2:17—is not a false convert, in this view the word "dead" refers to a faith that is not profitable in this life nor in the judgement seat of Christ, but does not imply false conversion. Thus, when the epistle of James says "can that faith save him", it is either understood as salvation from temporal consequences of sin (as with Hodges), salvation from a loss of reward (as with Bing), both (as with Dillow), or as the physical salvation of the poor person described in the chapter (as with R. T. Kendall).

There are some differences among free grace theologians on the issue of fruit in a Christian life. More moderate free grace theologians still affirm that faith will necessarily lead into good works, although it may not be outwardly evident or last to the end of one's life. However, those who hold to a more strong form of free grace theology deny that every Christian will bear fruit in their life.

== Methodist view ==
Methodism affirms the doctrine of justification by faith, but in Wesleyan–Arminian theology, justification refers to "pardon, the forgiveness of sins", rather than "being made actually just and righteous", which Methodists believe is accomplished through sanctification. John Wesley, the founder of the Methodist Churches, taught that the keeping of the moral law contained in the Ten Commandments, as well as engaging in the works of piety and the works of mercy, were "indispensable for our sanctification".

"It is incumbent on all that are justified to be zealous of good works," says Wesley, "And these are so necessary that if a man willingly neglects them, he cannot reasonably expect that he shall ever be sanctified."

— "The Scripture Way of Salvation" in Sermons II [vol. 3; ed. A.C. Outler; Abingdon, 1985], 164).

Methodist pastor Amy Wagner has written:

Wesley understood faith as a necessity for salvation, even calling it "the sole condition" of salvation, in the sense that it led to justification, the beginning point of salvation. At the same time, "as glorious and honorable as [faith] is, it is not the end of the commandment. God hath given this honor to love alone."

— "The Law Established through Faith II", §II.1

Faith is "an unspeakable blessing" because "it leads to that end, the establishing anew the law of love in our hearts".

— "The Law Established through Faith II", §II.6

This end, the law of love ruling in our hearts, is the fullest expression of salvation; it is Christian perfection.

— Amy Wagner

Methodist soteriology emphasizes the importance of the pursuit of holiness in salvation. Thus, for Wesley, "true faith ... cannot subsist without works". Bishop Scott J. Jones in United Methodist Doctrine (2002) writes that in Wesleyan theology:

Faith is necessary to salvation unconditionally. Good works are necessary only conditionally, that is if there is time and opportunity. The thief on the cross in Luke 23:39–43 is Wesley's example of this. He believed in Christ and was told, "Truly I tell you, today you will be with me in Paradise." This would be impossible if the good works that are the fruit of genuine repentance and faith were unconditionally necessary for salvation. The man was dying and lacked time; his movements were confined and he lacked opportunity. In his case, faith alone was necessary. However, for the vast majority of human beings good works are necessary for continuance in faith because those persons have both the time and opportunity for them.

Bishop Jones concludes that "Methodist doctrine thus understands true, saving faith to be the kind that, given time and opportunity, will result in good works. Any supposed faith that does not in fact lead to such behaviors is not genuine, saving faith." Methodist evangelist Phoebe Palmer stated that "justification would have ended with me had I refused to be holy". While "faith is essential for a meaningful relationship with God, our relationship with God also takes shape through our care for people, the community, and creation itself." Methodism, inclusive of the Holiness movement, thus teaches that "justification [is made] conditional on obedience and progress in sanctification", emphasizing "a deep reliance upon Christ not only in coming to faith, but in remaining in the faith". The believer who is entirely sanctified (cleansed "from all inward sin and empowered for service") maintains his/her salvation by "faith and obedience" to God.

Richard P. Bucher contrasts this position with the Lutheran one, discussing an analogy put forth by John Wesley:

Whereas in Lutheran theology the central doctrine and focus of all our worship and life is justification by grace through faith, for Methodists the central focus has always been holy living and the striving for perfection. Wesley gave the analogy of a house. He said repentance is the porch. Faith is the door. But holy living is the house itself. Holy living is true religion. "Salvation is like a house. To get into the house you first have to get on the porch (repentance) and then you have to go through the door (faith). But the house itself—one's relationship with God—is holiness, holy living.

— Joyner, paraphrasing Wesley, 3.

== Supporting confessional excerpts ==
=== Anabaptism ===
The position of the Mennonite Church USA is set out in the pamphlet Confession of Faith in a Mennonite Perspective (1995). The commentary to Article 8 of the Confession emphasizes both faith and obedience as normative for salvation:

This confession uses a variety of expressions for salvation. For example, salvation is often expressed as "justification by faith". The justification that is "reckoned" to us as salvation (Rom. 4:1–12) is experienced as a covenant relationship with God. A covenant is a binding agreement between two parties. God offers the relationship. The just, or righteous, person has received the offer, lives according to the covenant, and trusts in God's faithfulness. Justification by faith and faithful obedience to the covenant relationship are inseparable (Heb. 11).

=== Anglicanism ===
The Anglican position is set out in the Thirty-nine Articles, specifically Article XI "Of the Justification of Man":

We are accounted righteous before God, only for the merit of our Lord and Saviour Jesus Christ by faith, and not for our own works or deservings. Wherefore that we are justified by faith only is a most wholesome doctrine, and very full of comfort; as more largely is expressed in the Homily of Justification.

— Thirty-nine Articles of Religion (1571)

=== Lutheranism ===
Our churches by common consent ... teach that men cannot be justified before God by their own strength, merits, or works, but are freely justified for Christ's sake, through faith, when they believe that they are received into favor, and that their sins are forgiven for Christ's sake, who, by His death, has made satisfaction for our sins. This faith God imputes for righteousness in His sight. Rom. 3 and 4.

— Article IV, "Of Justification", Augsburg Confession, 1530

=== Baptist ===
Justification is God's gracious and full acquittal upon principles of His righteousness of all sinners who repent and believe in Christ. Justification brings the believer unto a relationship of peace and favor with God.

— Baptist Faith and Message 2000, Article IV, sub-article B

=== Reformed ===
==== Continental Reformed ====
We believe that our blessedness lies in the forgiveness of our sins because of Jesus Christ, and that in it our righteousness before God is contained, as David and Paul teach us when they declare that man blessed to whom God grants righteousness apart from works.

And the same apostle says that we are justified "freely" or "by grace" through redemption in Jesus Christ. And therefore we cling to this foundation, which is firm forever, giving all glory to God, humbling ourselves, and recognizing ourselves as we are; not claiming a thing for ourselves or our merits and leaning and resting on the sole obedience of Christ crucified, which is ours when we believe in him.

That is enough to cover all our sins and to make us confident, freeing the conscience from the fear, dread, and terror of God's approach, without doing what our first father, Adam, did, who trembled as he tried to cover himself with fig leaves.

In fact, if we had to appear before God relying—no matter how little—on ourselves or some other creature, then, alas, we would be swallowed up.

Therefore everyone must say with David: "Lord, do not enter into judgment with your servants, for before you no living person shall be justified."

— Article 23: "The Justification of Sinners", Belgic Confession, 1561 (French revision, 1619)

Question 86: Since then we are delivered from our misery, merely of grace, through Christ, without any merit of ours, why must we still do good works?

Answer: Because Christ, having redeemed and delivered us by his blood, also renews us by his Holy Spirit, after his own image; that so we may testify, by the whole of our conduct, our gratitude to God for his blessings, and that he may be praised by us; also, that every one may be assured in himself of his faith, by the fruits thereof; and that, by our godly conversation others may be gained to Christ.

Question 87: Cannot they then be saved, who, continuing in their wicked and ungrateful lives, are not converted to God?

Answer: By no means; for the holy scripture declares that no unchaste person, idolater, adulterer, thief, covetous man, drunkard, slanderer, robber, or any such like, shall inherit the kingdom of God.

— Heidelberg Catechism, 1563

==== Presbyterian ====
I. Those whom God effectually calls, He also freely justifies; not by infusing righteousness into them, but by pardoning their sins, and by accounting and accepting their persons as righteous; not for any thing wrought in them, or done by them, but for Christ's sake alone; nor by imputing faith itself, the act of believing, or any other evangelical obedience to them, as their righteousness; but by imputing the obedience and satisfaction of Christ unto them, they receiving and resting on Him and His righteousness by faith; which faith they have not of themselves, it is the gift of God.

— Chapter XI. "Of Justification". Westminster Confession of Faith (1647)

==== Reformed Baptist ====
XXVIII. That those which have union with Christ, are justified from all their sins, past, present, and to come, by the blood of Christ; which justification we conceive to be a gracious and free acquittance of a guilty, sinful creature, from all sin by God, through the satisfaction that Christ hath made by his death; and this applied in the manifestation of it through faith.

— First London Baptist Confession (1644)

Chapter XI of the London Baptist Confession of Faith 1689 is the same as the Westminster Confession of Faith.

=== Methodism ===
The following statements from confessions of faiths of the Wesleyan–Arminian tradition reflect Methodist theology on salvation:

We are accounted righteous before God only for the merit of our Lord and Saviour Jesus Christ, by faith, and not for our own works or deservings. Wherefore, that we are justified by faith, only, is a most wholesome doctrine, and very full of comfort.

— Article IX, "Of the Justification of Man", Articles of Religion of the Methodist Episcopal Church, the Discipline of 1808

We believe good works are the necessary fruits of faith and follow regeneration but they do not have the virtue to remove our sins or to avert divine judgment. We believe good works, pleasing and acceptable to God in Christ, spring from a true and living faith, for through and by them faith is made evident.

— Article X, "Good Works", The Confession of Faith (United Methodist Church)

=== Non-denominational Evangelicals ===
The justification of the sinner solely by the grace of God through faith in Christ crucified and risen from the dead.

— Statement of Faith, British Evangelical Alliance

We believe in ... the Salvation of lost and sinful man through the shed blood of the Lord Jesus Christ by faith apart from works, and regeneration by the Holy Spirit ...

— Statement of Faith, World Evangelical Alliance

== Additional ecumenical statements ==
=== Evangelical Protestants and Roman Catholics ===
The New Testament makes it clear that the gift of salvation is received through faith. "By grace you have been saved through faith; and this is not your own doing, it is the gift of God" (Ephesians 2:8). By faith, which is also the gift of God, we repent of our sins and freely adhere to the gospel, the good news of God's saving work for us in Christ. By our response of faith to Christ, we enter into the blessings promised by the gospel. Faith is not merely intellectual assent but an act of the whole persons involving the mind, the will, and the affections, issuing in a changed life. We understand that what we here affirm is in agreement with what the Reformation traditions have meant by justification by faith alone (sola fide).

— The Gift of Salvation (1997)

=== Lutheran World Federation and the Roman Catholic Church ===
4.3 Justification by Faith and through Grace

25. We confess together that sinners are justified by faith in the saving action of God in Christ. By the action of the Holy Spirit in Baptism, they are granted the gift of salvation, which lays the basis for the whole Christian life. They place their trust in God's gracious promise by justifying faith, which includes hope in God and love for him. Such a faith is active in love and thus the Christian cannot and should not remain without works. But whatever in the justified precedes or follows the free gift of faith is neither the basis of justification nor merits it.

— Joint Declaration on the Doctrine of Justification (1997)

In the preamble , it is suggested that much of the debate on sola fide has been based on condemnations of caricatured positions not actually held: "The teaching of the Lutheran Churches presented in the Declaration does not fall under the condemnations from the Council of Trent. The condemnations in the Lutheran Confessions do not apply to the teaching of the Roman Catholic Church presented in this Declaration."

=== Lutheran-Orthodox Joint Commission ===
5. Regarding the way in which salvation is appropriated by the believers, Lutherans, by teaching that justification and salvation are by grace alone through faith (sola gratia, sola fide), stress the absolute priority of divine grace in salvation. When they speak about saving faith they do not think of the dead faith which even the demons have (cf. James 2:19), but the faith which Abraham showed and which was reckoned to him as righteousness (cf. Gen. 15:6, Rom. 4:3,9). The Orthodox also affirm the absolute priority of divine grace. They underline that it is God's grace which enables our human will to conform to the divine will (cf. Phil 2:13) in the steps of Jesus praying, "not as I will but as You will" (Matthew 26:39), so that we may work out our salvation in fear and trembling (cf. Phil. 2:12). This is what the Orthodox mean by "synergy" (working together) of divine grace and the human will of the believer in the appropriation of the divine life in Christ. The understanding of synergy in salvation is helped by the fact that the human will in the one person of Christ was not abolished when the human nature was united in Him with the divine nature, according to the Christological decisions of the Ecumenical Councils. While Lutherans do not use the concept of synergy, they recognize the personal responsibility of the human being in the acceptance or refusal of divine grace through faith, and in the growth of faith and obedience to God. Lutherans and Orthodox both understand good works as the fruits and manifestations of the believer's faith and not as a means of salvation.

== Protestant controversies ==
Some scholars of early Christianity are adherents of the New Perspective on Paul and so believe sola fide is a misinterpretation on the part of Lutherans and that Paul was actually speaking about laws (such as circumcision, dietary laws, sabbath, temple rituals, etc.) that were considered essential for the Jews of the time.

The doctrine of justification by faith alone and the role of repentance in salvation has been interpreted differently by different Protestants, causing multiple controversies such as the Majoristic controversy (16th century), Antinomian Controversy (17th century), the Marrow Controversy (18th century), the Lordship salvation controversy (1980s), and the Hyper-Grace controversy (21st century).

== See also ==
- Antinomianism
- Belief in Jesus
- Double imputation
- Expounding of the Law
- Fate of the unlearned
- John 3:16
- Justification from eternity
- Murji'ah
- Shinran

== Sources ==
- Dillow, Joseph (2014). Final Destiny: The Future Reign of the Servant Kings. Colorado Springs, CO: Paniym Group.
- Origen; Scheck, Thomas P. (2009). Commentary on the Epistle to the Romans, Books 1-5. Washington, DC: CUA Press. ISBN 978-0-8132-1736-9.
