= Andreas de Vega =

Spanish theologian (died c. 1560)

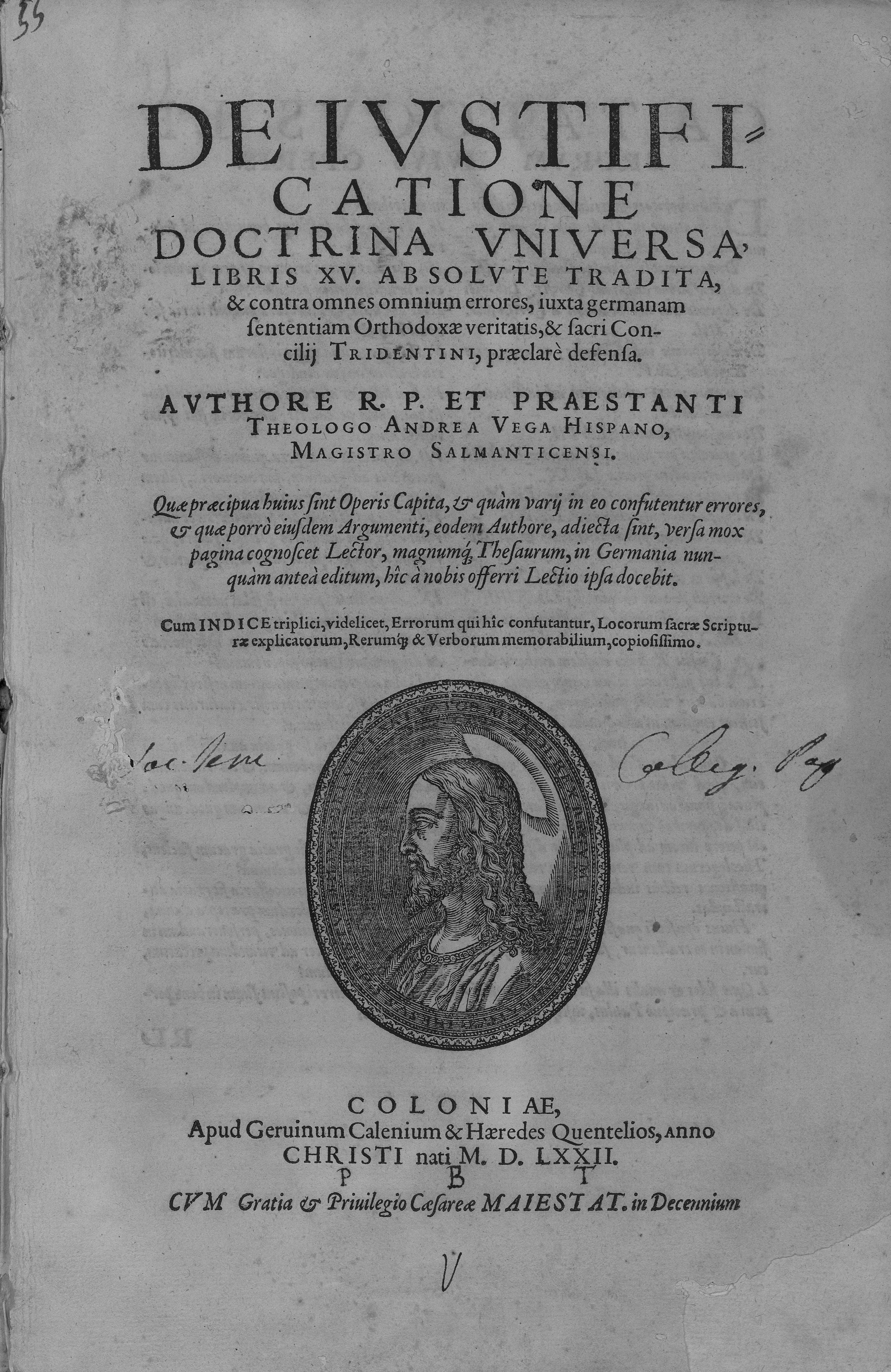
De iustificatione doctrina universa, 1572

Andreas de Vega (died c. 1560) was a Spanish theologian and Franciscan Observantine.

== Life ==
Vega was born at Segovia in Old Castile, Spain. He studied at the University of Salamanca, and was a professor there when he became an Observantine of the Franciscan Order. He continued his work as a teacher in the monastery of the Observantines where Alphonso de Castro also taught. He died at Salamanca.

Vega was a moderate Scotist who at the same time held to St. Bonaventure. The Emperor Charles V sent Vega as theologian together with other scholars to the Council of Trent. At Trent he came into connection with Cardinal Petrus Pacheco, Bishop of Jaen (consequently called "Giennensis"), who was a patron of the Franciscan Order. Vega was conspicuous in the preliminary discussions of the canon of the Scriptures and on the Vulgate, which were treated in the Decree promulgated in the fourth session of the council, 8 April 1546. He also took a prominent part in the preliminary discussions on the dogma of justification, and drew attention to himself at the same time by his debates with Dominicus de Soto, the Dominican who defended the dogmas of Thomism. The Decree was promulgated in the sixth session on 13 January 1547.

== Works ==
Previous to the council Vega had written to defend the Catholic doctrine of justification against the Protestants, "De justificatione, gratia fide, operibus et meritis quaestiones quindecim" (Venice, 1546). The dedication to Cardinal Pacheco is dated Trent, 1 January 1546. After the promulgation of the Decree he wrote in its defence at Trent and Venice, "Tridentini decreti de justificatione exposition et defensio lib. XV distincta" (Venice, 1548). In the last two books he attacks John Calvin's "Acta synodi tridentinae cum antidoto" (Geneva, 1547). This was Vega's major work. Peter Canisius had it reprinted at Cologne (1572) in one volume with Vega's previous work, "De justificatione". Reprints were issued at Cologne (1585) and at Aschaffenburg (1621).

A posthumous work by Vega was also published, his "Commentaria in Psalmos" (Alaclà de Henares, 1599).
