= Imputed righteousness =

Doctrine in Christianity; faithful humans are accepted by God

Imputed righteousness is a concept in Christian theology proposing that the "righteousness of Christ ... is imputed to [believers]—that is, treated as if it were theirs—through faith." It is on the basis of Jesus' righteousness that God accepts humans. This acceptance is also referred to as justification.

The teaching of imputed righteousness is a signature doctrine of the Lutheran, Reformed and Anglican traditions of Christianity.

== Formulation ==
Catholic scholar Erasmus raises almost the first recorded distinction between to impute and to repute in 1503 Handbook of the Christian Knight. In his seminal 1516 Novum Instrumentum omne Latin rescension (finished late in 1515 but printed in March 1516), Erasmus consistently rendered the Greek logizomai (reckon) as "imputat" all eleven times it appears in Romans chapter four; however Erasmus did not believe that for every abstract word in Greek there was one exact equivalent in some other language. The Vulgate Erasmus intended to improve usually rendered it "reputat" (repute); Lorenzo Valla had previously used both.

Luther did use the term in this sense as early as 1516. Some modern Lutherans deny that Luther taught it before other reformers such as Melancthon. Erasmus held that Luther's subsequent development of forensic imputation went too far.

== Imputed, infused and imparted righteousness ==
Discussion of these concepts are complicated by different definitions of key terms, such as "justification" and "grace".

- In Protestant theology, imputed righteousness is the righteousness of Jesus credited to the Christian, enabling the Christian to be justified. Double imputation is to the imputation of believers' sin to Christ and the imputation of Christ's righteousness to believers. It is closely related to the Reformed doctrine of justification by grace through faith alone. Passages like 2 Corinthians 5:21, are employed to argue for a dual imputation – the imputation of one's sin to Christ and then of his righteousness to believers in him.
  - In the (Lutheran, Calvinist) Protestant concept, justification is a status before God that is entirely the result of God's activity and that continues even when humans sin. Thus using different words for justification and sanctification reflects a distinction between aspects of salvation that are entirely the result of God's activity, and those that involve human cooperation.
  - In Methodist theology, imparted righteousness, is what God does in Christ by the power of the Holy Spirit after justification, working in the Christian to enable and empower the process of sanctification (and, in Wesleyan thought, Christian perfection). John Wesley believed that imparted righteousness worked in tandem with imputed righteousness.
- Infused righteousness, by contrast, can be described as: "In Augustine's view, God bestows justifying righteousness upon the sinner in such a way that it becomes part of his or her person." Starting with Augustine, the Catholic tradition has understood justification as the entire process by which God forgives and then transforms Christians.

Based on their reading of the use of "justification" in Paul's letters, the Reformers took justification to refer specifically to God's forgiveness and acceptance. The term "sanctification" was used to refer to the lifelong process of transformation. Thus the Catholic term "justification" effectively includes both what Protestants refer to as "justification" and "sanctification." This difference in definitions can result in confusion, effectively exaggerating the disagreement. However the difference in definitions reflects a difference in substance.

Catholic theology uses a single term, in part because it does not recognize a distinction of this type. In Catholic theology, while everything originates with God, the entire process of justification requires human cooperation, and serious sin compromises it.

=== Imputed vs. infused ===
Both imputed and infused righteousness agree that God is the source of our righteousness, and that it is a gift that humans cannot deserve. Both models agree that God's activity results in humans being transformed, so that over time they become more obedient to God, and sin is progressively defeated in their lives.

The distinction includes at least two areas:

1 How justification is maintained, and the effect of sin
According to imputed righteousness, the righteousness by which humans are made acceptable to God, remains "alien." Since their acceptability is based on God's actions, nothing humans do can forfeit their status as accepted. Sin can result in God treating them as disobedient, but not in God disowning them.
Protestants differ on the question of whether it is possible for humans to forfeit justification. But if they do, it is by ceasing to have faith in God, not by any individual sin.
Catholics hold that righteousness comes to be present in humans, and that the continuing status of acceptance is based on this. Humans have a responsibility to cooperate with God in maintaining and strengthening the presence of this "grace" in their lives. Certain serious sins (called "mortal sins") can result in its loss.
Thus in the case of serious sins, Protestants believe that they continue to be treated as God's children, but as disobedient ones that require discipline, while Catholics believe that the bond with God is largely severed, and restoring it requires "a new initiative of God's mercy and a conversion of heart normally accomplished within the setting of the sacrament of reconciliation."

2 Merit
Protestants have avoided speaking of humans as having any "merit" before God. Because all justifying righteousness is alien, humans do not deserve anything good from God. Because Catholics hold that righteousness comes to be present in humans, humans can in a certain sense merit reward. Of course any such merit is ultimately due to God's activity.
Protestants and Catholics agree that non-Christians can do things that are worthwhile. They do not merit salvation, but some Protestant writers have spoken of them as reflecting "civil righteousness."

While there are significant differences between imputed and infused righteousness, they can be regarded to a certain extent as differences in emphasis that are potentially complementary. Imputed righteousness emphasizes that salvation is a gift from God and is dependent upon him, while infused righteousness emphasizes the responsibility of humans to cooperate with God's actions in transforming their lives. The position that they are potentially complementary was taken in a joint declaration of the Lutheran World Federation and the Catholic Church. Enough differences remain, however, both in doctrine and in practical consequences, that not everyone agrees that the two views can be regarded as complementary.

== What is meant by righteousness? ==
The concepts here are nominally derived from the letters of Paul the Apostle (particularly the Epistle to the Romans), which form a large part of the Christian New Testament.

However the concepts have been filtered through the concerns of later Christian theology. From at least the time of Augustine of Hippo in the 5th century, "righteousness" has been seen as a moral and religious quality. In the Catholic model, Christians are transformed by God's action, developing a righteousness of their own. In the 16th century, the Protestant Reformers came to understand human acceptance by God according to a "forensic" model, in which God declares humanity not guilty, even though they were in a moral sense still guilty of sin. However, the Reformers continued to accept the traditional concept of righteousness. What changed is that the righteousness was seen as Christ's, which was credited ("imputed") to Christians by God.

Starting in the middle of the 20th century, increased knowledge of first century Judaism has produced a reassessment of many of the concepts with which Paul was working. Many scholars now see "righteousness" as a Hebrew concept referring to fidelity to God's covenant with humanity (for God) or the status of being a proper member of that covenant (for a human). If this is correct, then righteousness is a status, not a quality of religious/moral perfection.

== The case against both imputed and imparted righteousness ==
This section is a precis of N. T. Wright's work in "What Saint Paul Really Said".

Wright, one of the best-known advocates of the New Perspective on Paul, teaches that "righteousness of God" and "righteousness from God" are distinct concepts that have been confused and conflated in the past. He relates the court-room metaphor, pointing out that there are three parties in the Hebrew court – two parties in disagreement and one judge (there is no "Prosecuting Attorney"). The judge decides the dispute between the parties declaring one to be correct and the other incorrect. The one who is declared "correct" in court is called "righteous" in the matter that was judged.

The "righteousness of God", referring to God's (the judge's) faithfulness to the covenant relationship, can be neither imputed nor imparted to anybody but refers only to his role as judge. "Righteousness from God" is roughly equivalent to "vindication", meaning that God is pronouncing that particular party to be correct/vindicated/righteous/acquitted in their dispute with the other party. The dispute in question in Christian theology is between those of faith (in God's promises: the covenant, the Messiah), and "the wicked," meaning everyone else. Paul posited that the people of such faith are vindicated when the Messiah returns, being declared "righteous" (or in other words, vindicated for their stance), which is the meaning of the Biblical term "justified", in Wright's view.

This means that we do not "receive" the righteousness of God (or as often expressed, "of Jesus"), as in the classical Evangelical vernacular, nor is it "infused" as in the classical Catholic vernacular. The "righteousness of God" remains His alone, and our "righteousness from God" means that we are found to be "of" the people of God. Paul's argument is that it has always been so, but what has changed is that the Messiah, in Jesus of Nazareth, has now appeared.

An important verse to note is 2 Cor 5:21, "For our sake he made him to be sin who knew no sin, so that in him we might become the righteousness of God" (ESV), which has traditionally been interpreted to mean that the Christian has, in some way, become righteous (by impartation or imputation), in exchange for Jesus' sinlessness. Moreover, Wright says, Paul is speaking here of the apostles, and pointing out that in their role as apostles, their activity is effectively God's righteousness (covenant faithfulness) in action ("we are ambassadors for Christ, God making his appeal through us. We implore you on behalf of Christ, be reconciled to God" – verse 20). This meaning is natural when taken in context from verse 11 through 21.

== The case for imputed righteousness ==
Imputed righteousness is the Protestant Christian doctrine that a sinner is declared righteous by God purely by God's grace through faith in Christ, and thus all depends on Christ's merit and worthiness, rather than on one's own merit and worthiness. On the one hand, God is infinitely merciful, "not wishing for any to perish, but for all to come to repentance." (2 Peter 3:9) – though this passage is often interpreted by many Protestants as referring only to Christians, as the context of the epistle indicates that Peter's audience were believers, and the first half of the verse indicates that the promises of God to believers are not late but patiently enduring the unfolding of history as God sovereignly saves His own through time. On the other, God is infinitely holy and just, which means that he cannot approve of or even look upon evil (Habakkuk 1:13), neither can he justify a wicked person (Book of Proverbs 17:15). Because the Bible describes all men as sinners and says that there are none who are righteous (Epistle to the Romans 3:23, 10) this is a classic theological tension. To use the words of St Paul, how can God be "just and the justifier of those who believe (Rom. 3:26)?" Through this argument, God cannot ignore or in any way overlook sin.

Adherents say that God the Father resolves this problem by sending Christ, who is sinless and indestructibly perfect in character, to lead a perfect life and sacrifice himself for the sins of mankind. The sins of the repentant sinner are cast onto Christ, who is a perfect sacrifice. First of all, they note that the New Testament describes the method of man's salvation as the "righteousness of God" (Rom. 3:21, 22; 10:3; Philippians 3:9). They then note that this imputed righteousness is particularly that of Jesus Christ (2 Corinthians 5:21; 1 Corinthians 1:30). When they refer to the "imputed righteousness of Christ," they are referring to his intrinsic character as well as his life of sinlessness and perfect obedience to God's law on Earth, usually called his active obedience. The need for a human life of perfect obedience to God's law was the reason that Christ, who is God, had to become incarnate (take on human flesh) and live as a human being. Paul's statement in Romans 4:6, that God "imputes righteousness apart from works," is the basis for the fourth step in the argument that this righteousness of Christ is imputed to the believer's account. By this terminology, they mean that God legally credits the believer with the righteous acts that Christ performed while on this earth. Luther uses the language of a "fortunate exchange" to describe this concept, borrowed from St Paul's imagery in Colossians 3. Christ trades his "garments," holiness, righteousness, being blessed by God the Father, in exchange for human sin. This is really good news for sinners – Christ takes their sin and believers receive His blessed condition and righteousness.

This righteousness of Christ and its relationship to the recipient can also be likened to adoption. Adoption legally constitutes a child the son or daughter of a person that is not that child's birth parent. Similarly, in marriage the married partners are considered one entity legally. Sinners who believe in Christ are spiritually united with Christ, and that union makes it possible for God to credit believers with the righteousness of Christ without engaging in "legal fiction."

== Arguments against the doctrine of imputed righteousness ==
A major objection to imputed righteousness is that it appears to be a means of acquitting the guilty rather than pardoning the guilty. (Scripture denies the possibility of acquitting the guilty in Exodus 23:7 and Deuteronomy 25:1.) The Greek word δικαιοο, usually translated "justify," may be understood in another sense: "to do justice" "to have justice done" (Thayer's Lexicon) or "to satisfy justice." The 1968 Supplement of Liddell Scott and Jones also includes the definition, "brought to justice"; this sense is the normative definition found in Hellenistic Greek meaning "to punish" or "administer justice (to someone)." Instead of meaning declared righteous or made righteous, the term may mean the proper or legally approved punishment has been administered. Understood this way, the objectionable idea of acquitting the guilty in the term "justify" is avoided.

=== Catholic ===
Many Christians, most notably Catholics, believe that when God declares (imputes) a repentant person as righteous in Christ (justification) he also starts infusing that person with real righteousness (sanctification). This, therefore, means that person is now infused with the righteousness of Christ: Christ's righteousness is a present reality, but it is also in the form of that person's own righteousness.

=== Holiness movement ===
Denominations aligned with the Holiness tradition, including the Methodist Churches and Religious Society of Friends (Quakers), in addition to certain Anabaptists (such as the Apostolic Christian Church (Nazarene)) and Restorationists (such as the Church of God (Guthrie, Oklahoma), have various doctrines that relate to a "second work of grace" that brings real not just imputed righteousness to the believer.

=== Swedenborgianism ===
The Protestant doctrine of imputed righteousness is also opposed by the doctrine of The New Church, as explained by Emanuel Swedenborg. The "imputation" of the Lord's merit is nothing but the remission of sins after repentance. According to Swedenborg,

"Mention is often made in the Word of "the righteous," of "righteousness," and of "to be made righteous;" but what is specifically signified by these expressions is not yet known. [...] It is believed by the heads of the church that he is righteous, and has been made righteous, who is acquainted with the truths of faith from the doctrine of the church and from the Word, and consequently is in the trust and confidence that he is saved through the Lord's righteousness, and that the Lord has acquired righteousness by fulfilling all things of the Law, and that He acquired merit because He endured the cross, and thereby made atonement for and redeemed man. Through this faith alone a man is believed to be made righteous; and it is believed further that such are they who are called in the Word "the righteous." Yet it is not these who are called "righteous" in the Word; but those who from the Lord are in the good of charity toward the neighbor; for the Lord alone is righteous, because He alone is righteousness."

— Emanuel Swedenbord

== Differing views about imputed righteousness ==
=== Catholic view ===
"The Catholic idea maintains that the formal cause of justification does not consist (only) in an exterior imputation of the justice of Christ, but in a real, interior sanctification effected by grace, which abounds in the soul and makes it permanently holy before God. Although the sinner is justified by the justice of Christ, inasmuch as the Redeemer has merited for him or her the grace of justification (causa meritoria), nevertheless he or she is formally justified and made holy by his or her own personal justice and holiness (causa formalis)." Although internal and proper to the one justified, this justice and holiness are still understood as a gift of grace through the Holy Spirit rather than something earned or acquired independently of God's salvific work.

Put starkly, the Catholic Church rejects the teaching of imputed righteousness as being a present reality. This is at the very center of the disagreements between Catholics and Lutherans, and remains the primary sticking point to a unification of these traditions to this day.

=== Lutheran view ===
Philipp Melanchthon, a contemporary of Martin Luther, stressed the classic Lutheran desire to distinguish carefully and properly between Law and Gospel. In doing so he emphasized that Law binds, convicts, and drives people, while the Gospel proclaims repentance, the promise of grace, eternal life, and proclaims their liberty in Christ.

=== Reformed view ===
The Reformed and Presbyterian churches have generally followed the Lutherans on the importance of distinguishing the law and the gospel. Articulated in terms of Covenant Theology, law and gospel have been associated with the Covenant of Law (Mosaic, not to be confused with Covenant of Works, Adamic) and the Covenant of Grace, respectively. Historically, they have been more open to the broader biblical language the Lutheran Formula of Concord calls "correct" but not "proper."

== See also ==
- Imparted righteousness
- Original sin
- Righteousness
- Salvation
