= Infused righteousness =

Doctrine of the Roman Catholic Church

Infused righteousness forms the basis for the doctrine of justification in the Roman Catholic Church and is rooted in the theology of Thomas Aquinas and Augustine of Hippo. The doctrine states that through keeping the commands of Christ, regular confession and penance, and receiving the sacraments, God's grace/righteousness is "infused" in believers more and more over time, and their own "righteousness in the flesh" becomes subsumed into God's righteousness.

Alister McGrath summarises the difference between the doctrine of infused righteousness, and Martin Luther's doctrine of imputed righteousness:

"In Augustine’s view, God bestows justifying righteousness upon the sinner in such a way that it becomes part of his or her person. As a result, this righteousness, although originating outside the sinner, becomes part of him or her.

In Luther’s view, by contrast, the righteousness in question remains outside the sinner: it is an 'alien righteousness' (iustitia aliena). God treats, or 'reckons,' this righteousness as if it is part of the sinner’s person

...

The importance of this development lies in the fact that it marks a complete break with the teaching of the church up to that point. From the time of Augustine onward, justification had always been understood to refer to both the event of being declared righteous and the process of being made righteous."

== See also ==
- Imparted righteousness
- Imputed righteousness
