= Imparted righteousness =

Concept in Methodist theology

Imparted righteousness, in Methodist theology, is that gracious gift of God given at the moment of the new birth which enables a Christian disciple to strive for holiness and sanctification. John Wesley believed that imparted righteousness worked in tandem with imputed righteousness. Imputed righteousness is the righteousness of Jesus credited to the Christian, enabling the Christian to be justified; imparted righteousness is what God does in Christ by the power of the Holy Spirit after justification, working in the Christian to enable and empower the process of sanctification (and, in Wesleyan thought, Christian perfection).

== Scriptural support ==
- Jeremiah 31:33-34 "But this is the covenant that I will make with the house of Israel after those days, declares the Lord: I will put my law within them, and I will write it on their hearts. And I will be their God, and they shall be my people. And no longer shall each one teach his neighbor and each his brother, saying, ‘Know the Lord,’ for they shall all know me, from the least of them to the greatest, declares the Lord. For I will forgive their iniquity, and I will remember their sin no more.”" (ESV)
- 2 Corinthians 3:18 "And we all, with unveiled face, beholding the glory of the Lord, are being transformed into the same image from one degree of glory to another. For this comes from the Lord who is the Spirit." (ESV)

== John Wesley ==
- Sermon #4: "Scriptural Christianity"
- Sermon #14: "The Repentance of Believers"
- Sermon #17: "The Circumcision of the Heart"
- Sermon #20: "The Lord Our Righteousness"
- Sermon #45: "The New Birth"

== Hymnody and other sources ==
Charles Wesley believed in imparted righteousness. This comes through in the Wesleyan hymnody such as his famous hymn "And can it be". The last verse reads:

No condemnation now I dread; Jesus, and all in Him, is mine ! Alive in Him, my living Head, And clothed in righteousness divine, Bold I approach the eternal throne, And claim the crown, through Christ my own.

Clothed in righteousness divine. Ephesians 6:14 [TNIV] says "Stand firm then with the belt of truth buckled around your waist, with the breastplate of righteousness in place...."

== Protestant distinctive in imparted righteousness ==
Preachers and theologians from various Protestant traditions (not only Wesleyan) use the term "imparted righteousness" to identify the righteous principle imparted by God to believers when He regenerates them. Believers thereby become "partakers of the divine nature" (cf. 2 Peter 1:4). It is this principle of righteousness imparted to men in regeneration which is ever in conflict with the old Adamic nature. Protestants, however, maintain the distinction between the "imputed righteousness" of Christ which is the basis for justification and the "imparted righteousness" which is the basis for subsequent sanctification.

It is somewhat problematic for some Christians (notably Calvinists) to call the doctrine "imparted righteousness," for that which is imparted is a righteous principle into man's nature, not righteousness per se. Care must be taken in using the term imparted righteousness because it is sometimes confused with and sometimes intentionally used to refer to the Roman Catholic doctrine of infused righteousness, which in Catholicism is the basis for justification.

== The "NPP" case against both Imputed and Infused Righteousness ==
This section is a precis of N. T. Wright's work in "What Saint Paul Really Said".

N. T. Wright, who is one of the best-known advocates of the New Perspective on Paul, explains that although the "righteousness of God" and "righteousness from God" have been confused and conflated in the past, they are distinct concepts. He relates the court-room metaphor, pointing out that there are three parties in the Hebrew court - two parties in disagreement and one judge (there is no "Prosecuting Attorney"). The judge decides the outcome of the dispute between the parties, declaring one to be correct and the other incorrect. The one who is declared "correct" in court is called "righteous" in the matter that was judged.

The "righteousness of God", referring to God's (the judge's) faithfulness to the covenant relationship, can be neither imputed nor imparted to anybody but refers only to His role as judge.

"Righteousness from God" is roughly equivalent to "vindication", meaning that God is pronouncing that particular party to be correct/vindicated/righteous/acquitted in their dispute with the other party.

The dispute in question in Christian theology is between those of faith (in God's promises: the covenant, the Messiah), and "the wicked", meaning everybody opposed to those of faith. Paul was positing that the people of such faith are vindicated when Messiah returns, being declared "righteous" (or in other words, vindicated for their stance), which is exactly the meaning of the Biblical term "justified" in N. T. Wright's view.

This means that we do not "receive" the righteousness of God (or as often expressed, "of Jesus") as in the classical Evangelical vernacular, nor is it "infused" as stated in the classical Roman Catholic vernacular. The "righteousness of God" remains His alone, and our "righteousness from God" means that we are found to be "of" the people of God. Paul's argument is that it has always been so, but what has changed is that the Messiah, in Jesus of Nazareth, has now appeared.

An important verse to note is 2 Cor 5:21, "For our sake he made him to be sin who knew no sin, so that in him we might become the righteousness of God." (ESV), which has traditionally been interpreted to mean that the Christian has, in some way, become righteous (by infusion or imputation), in exchange for Jesus' sinlessness. In fact, N. T. Wright says, Paul is speaking here of the apostles, and pointing out that in their role as apostles, their activity is effectively God's righteousness (covenant faithfulness) in action ("we are ambassadors for Christ, God making his appeal through us. We implore you on behalf of Christ, be reconciled to God" - vv 20–21). This meaning is natural when taken in context from verse 11 through 21. N. T. Wright is less than accurate:"the righteousness of God", like for example, "the fear of the Lord" is a subjective genitive,not an objective genitive.

== See also ==
- Christian perfection
- Deification (theosis)
- Imputed righteousness
- Infused righteousness
- Means of grace
- Andreas Osiander
- Sanctification
