= Justification (theology) =

Concept of Christian theology

Justification is a event where all humans are provided with righteousness and justification for their acts. It is the day of condemnation of the evil and the consideration of the innocent.

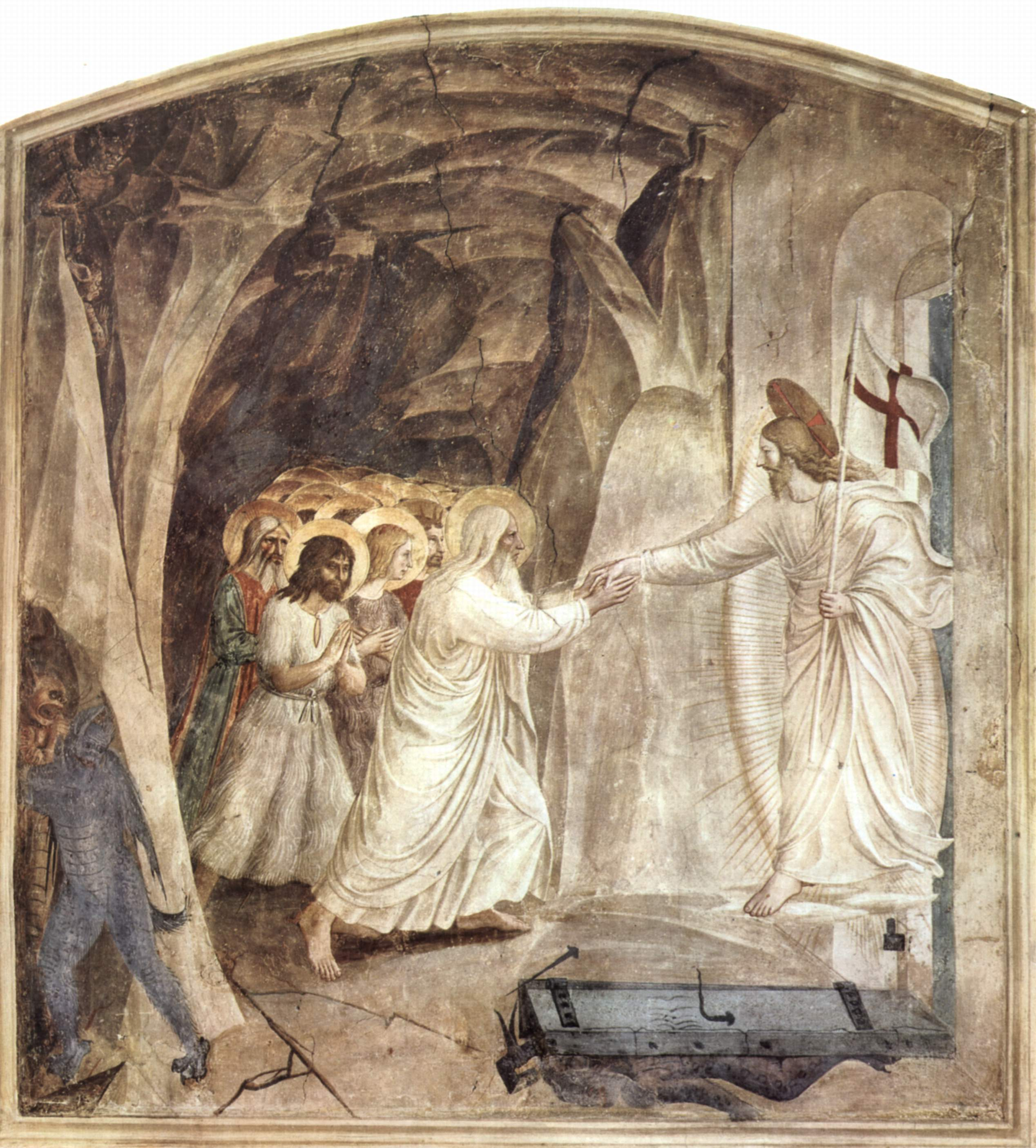
The Harrowing of Hell as depicted by Fra Angelico

In Christian theology, justification is the event or process by which sinners are made or declared to be righteous in the sight of God.

In the 21st century, there is now substantial agreement on justification by most Christian communions. The collective bodies of most of the largest Christian denominations, including Catholic, Lutheran, Reformed, Anglican and Methodist, have affirmed a 1999 Lutheran–Catholic Joint Declaration on the Doctrine of Justification that details this consensus, noting different distinctive emphases that individual communions consider essential to state.

Historically, the difference in theories on the means of justification has often been the theological fault line that divided Roman Catholicism, Eastern Orthodox, Oriental Orthodox from the Lutheran, Anglican and Reformed traditions of Protestantism during the Reformation.

Central issues of dispute have revolved around the nature or mechanism of the righteousness given by God when God justifies humans: is it a legality of imputation only where the person is not or only subsequently changed (associated with Protestants), or a dynamic transformative process where God's goodness is infused, or a moral and spiritual energy working in humans (associated with Anabaptists), or both imputed and infused (associated with Catholics), or better expressed using concepts such as "adhered" (Newman) or "reputed" (Erasmus)? Also: can justification be lost or re-gained? Can justification be usefully treated apart from sanctification and vice versa? What role does baptism play? Is it a process or event or both?

== Overview ==
Catholic and Orthodox doctrine characteristically have been interested in infused, i.e., God "pours" grace into one's soul or, "fills" one with his grace more and more over time; faith—shown through charity and good works—justifies sinners (fides caritate formata) and less focused on imputed righteousness.

Broadly speaking, Catholics have spoken of justification—which in their view initially occurs at baptism, partaking of the sacraments and the resulting grace of cooperation with God's will (sanctification)—as an organic whole: one act of reconciliation ultimately brought to completeness in glorification.

Orthodox theology similarly teaches that "Salvation is accomplished by grace in response to faith. But that faith cannot be passive; it must express itself by feeding, clothing, visiting and otherwise caring for the "least" of Jesus' brethren (Mt 25)." On sanctification, there is a characteristic emphasis in Byzantine Christianity on Theosis.

In the Lutheran and Reformed denominational traditions, this righteousness is portrayed as imputed to the inherently ungodly, by grace, through faith in the crucifiction and resurrection of Christ. The Reformed, Lutheran and Anglican traditions emphasize that "the observance of the moral law is not necessary either as a prerequisite for obtaining justification or as a means for preserving it." Therefore, a righteousness from God is viewed as being credited to the sinner's account through faith alone, apart from works, being based solely on the " Blood of Christ". Growth in personal holiness is considered distinct from justification, belonging rather to sanctification.

In Anabaptist Christianity, the Lutheran doctrine of justification is rejected. Rather than a forensic justification that only gives a legal change of one's status before God, Anabaptists teach that "justification begun a dynamic process by which the believer partook of the nature of Christ and was so enabled to live increasingly like Jesus."

In Catholic, Orthodox, and Protestant theology, anyone who has been justified will produce good works as a product of faith, as a result of God's grace in sanctification. Notable exceptions to the idea that sanctification and good works always accompany justification are found in Free Grace Theology held by many Independent Baptist churches.

For Lutherans, justification can be lost with the loss of faith. Lutherans affirm that mortal sin can destroy faith; for Catholics and Orthodox Christians, justification can also be lost by committing a mortal sin. Anabaptists teach that Christians can apostatize, resulting in a loss of salvation, through disobedience to God and indulgence in sin; for Methodists along with other groups belonging to the Holiness Movement, salvation also can be lost with the loss of faith or through sinning (cf. conditional security). The Reformed tradition generally holds that justification can never truly be lost: for those who have been justified by grace, will certainly persevere through faith until the return of Christ himself.

== Biblical and patristic references ==
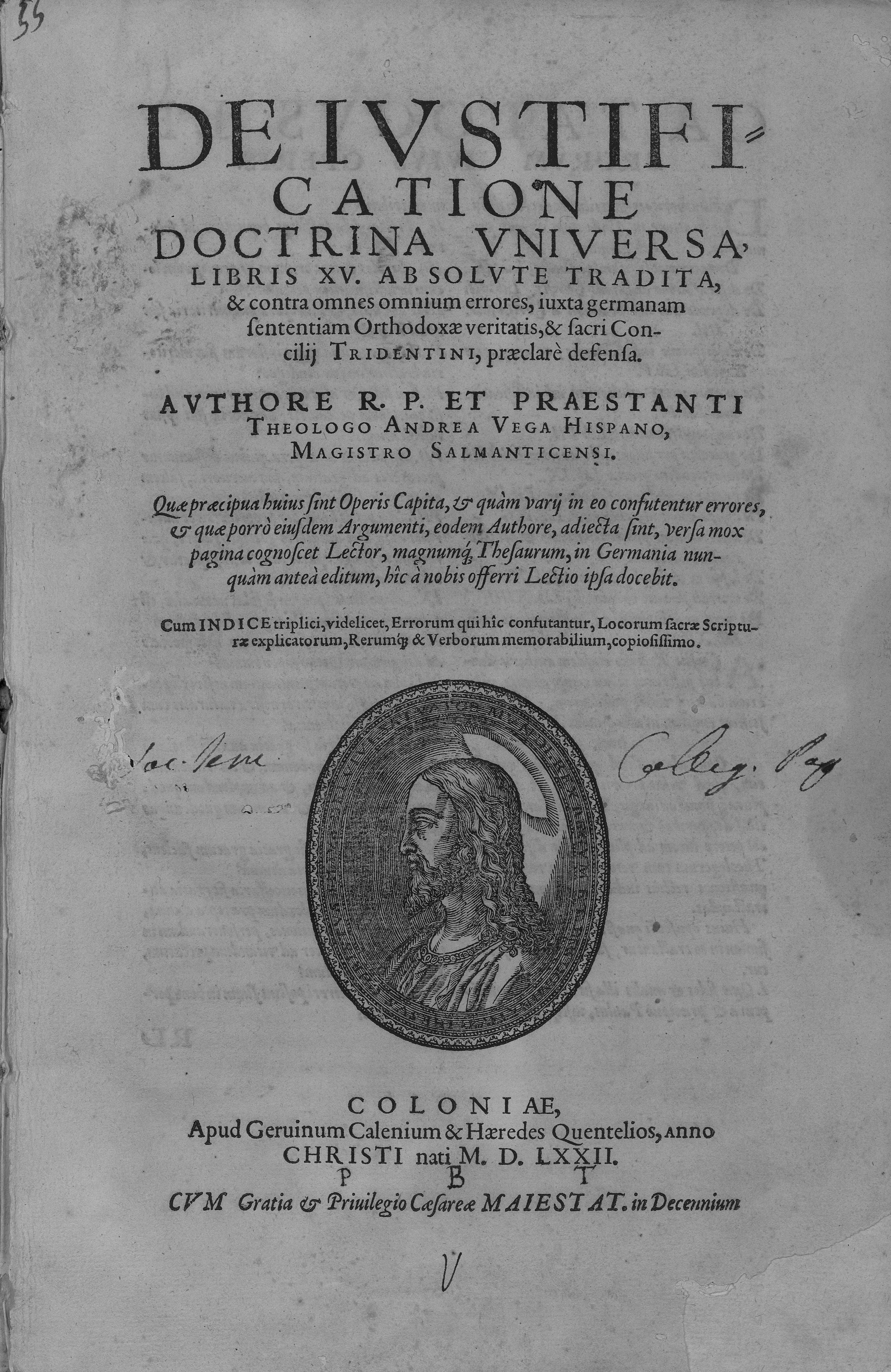
Andreas de Vega, De iustificatione doctrina universa, 1572

=== Gospels ===
Jesus used the idea of ransom, or redemption when referring to his work on earth (Matthew 20:28; Mark 10:45). Christ's death and resurrection (triumph over Satan and death) provide justification for believers before God. His righteousness becomes theirs, and his death becomes an offering to God in their place, to pay for all of their sins. According to Protestants this justification is by faith alone – not through good deeds – and is a gift from God through Christ. According to Catholics and Eastern Orthodox we are justified by God's grace which is a free gift but is received through baptism initially, through the faith that works for love in the continuous life of a Christian and through the sacrament of reconciliation if the grace of justification is lost through grave sin.

=== James ===
James discusses justification briefly but significantly, declaring that a faith that is without works, a fruitless faith (cf. Matthew 7:17), cannot be a justifying faith, because faith is made perfect or completed by works (James 2, especially James 2:22; see also Romans 4:11). Indeed, works are required for justification because "man is justified by works, and not by faith alone" (James 2:24), though the sense of the word justified in this passage is disputed. (Note: Catholics and others take it in its most common sense, whereas Protestants believe that that sense introduces a contradiction with Paul and so take the meaning in James to be "proved right" as in Matthew 11:19. Some also point to the difference between the episodes in the life of Abraham referenced by Paul and James. In Romans 4 Paul refers to Abraham's being counted righteous by faith in God's promise in Genesis 15, whereas James talks about Abraham's being "justified" in a sense more like "vindicated" in his faithful willingness to offer Isaac on the altar later in Genesis 22.) The writer of James emphasizes the Jewish belief that faith and deeds go together.

However, in James, it is possible that justification is referring to how believers are to behave as believers, not how an unbeliever becomes a believer (i.e., salvation). Faith without works is counterfeit. The faith must produce good fruit as a sign lest it become the occasion for self-justification.

Suppose a brother or sister is without clothes and daily food. If one of you says to him, "Go, I wish you well; keep warm and well fed", but does nothing about his physical needs, what good is it? In the same way, faith by itself, if it is not accompanied by action, is dead. But someone will say, "You have faith; I have deeds." Show me your faith without deeds, and I will show you my faith by what I do.

— James 2:15–18

D. James Kennedy explains this verse:

James is dealing with people who profess to be Christians, and yet they don't evidence the reality of their faith by their works [deeds]. Over, and over again... people will say they have faith and they don't have works, and James is saying that real faith always produces works as a result... The question is, 'A man may say that he has faith, but will that faith justify him?' If it is just a 'said' faith—no, it won't!

— D. James Kennedy, Irreconcilable Differences

=== Paul ===
It was Paul who developed the term justification in the theology of the church. Justification is a major theme of the epistles to the Romans and to the Galatians in the New Testament, and is also given treatment in many other epistles.

In Romans, Paul develops justification by first speaking of God's just wrath at sin (Romans 1:18–3:20). Justification is then presented as the solution for God's wrath (Romans 3:21–26, Romans 5:1). One is said to be 'justified by faith apart from works of the Law' (Romans 3:28). Further, Paul writes of sin and justification in terms of two men, Adam and Christ (Romans 5). Through Adam, sin came into the world bringing death; through Jesus, righteousness came into the world, bringing justification unto life (Romans 5:15–17). In this connection, Paul speaks of Adam's sin being 'imputed' or 'accounted' (Greek ελλογειται) and speaks of justification as acting in analogy to sin (Romans 5:13; Romans 5:18). In chapter 8, Paul connects justification with predestination and glorification (Romans 8:30). He further states that those who are justified cannot be separated from the love of Christ (Romans 8:33–39). Several of these passages are central in the debate between Roman Catholics, and the various streams of Protestantism (while there is broad agreement on justification by faith, there is no complete doctrinal uniformity on justification among all Protestant denominations), who can understand them in quite different ways.

In Galatians, Paul emphatically rejects justification by works of the Law, a rejection sparked apparently by a controversy concerning the necessity of circumcision for salvation (Galatians 2:16, Galatians 5:4; see also Romans 5:1–12 and Council of Jerusalem). He also adds that the only thing that counts is the "faith [which] works by love"(Galatians 5:6).

=== Other New Testament writers ===
The Epistle to the Hebrews also takes up the theme of justification, declaring that Jesus' death is superior to the Old Testament sacrifices in that it takes away sin once for all (Hebrews 10). In Hebrews, faith in Jesus' sacrifice includes steadfast perseverance (Hebrews 10:19–31, Hebrews 12:1).

=== Early church ===
Justification as a concept is mentioned in the works of early Church Fathers, and in the sermons of John Chrysostom, but it is not developed until Augustine's conflict with Pelagius.

Pelagius taught that one became righteous through the exertion of one's will to follow the example of Jesus' life. Over against this, Augustine taught that we are justified by God, as a work of his grace. Augustine took great pains in his anti-Pelagian works to refute the notion that our works could serve as the proper basis for our justification. Following an appeal from Augustine, Pope Innocent I condemned Pelagius. The accused heretic wrote an appeal of his own, declaring his innocence, which was duly accepted by Innocent's successor, Pope Zosimus. However, the Council of Carthage (418) again renounced Pelagius with papal approval.

== Joint Declaration on Doctrine of Justification (1999) ==
In 1999, Roman Catholics and most Lutherans as represented by most of the Lutheran councils worldwide agreed to the Joint Declaration on the Doctrine of Justification (JDDJ): with this, "consensus in basic truths of the doctrine of justification exists between Lutherans and Catholics."

=== Consensus ===
- "We confess together that sinners are justified by faith in the saving action of God in Christ. Such a faith is active in love and thus the Christian cannot and should not remain without works. But whatever in the justified precedes or follows the free gift of faith is neither the basis of justification nor merits it.
- "We confess together that in baptism the Holy Spirit unites one with Christ, justifies, and truly renews the person.
- "We confess: By grace alone, in faith in Christ's saving work and not because of any merit on our part, we are accepted by God and receive the Holy Spirit, who renews our hearts while equipping and calling us to good works.
- "We confess together that all persons depend completely on the saving grace of God for their salvation. Justification takes place solely by God's grace.
- "We confess together that persons are justified by faith in the gospel 'apart from works prescribed by the law' (Rom. 3:28); a faith which worketh by love, Gal. 5:6"
- "We confess together that good works – a Christian life lived in faith, hope and love – follow justification and are its fruits. When the justified live in Christ and act in the grace they receive, they bring forth, in biblical terms, good fruit. Since Christians struggle against sin their entire lives, this consequence of justification is also for them an obligation they must fulfill. Thus both Jesus and the apostolic Scriptures admonish Christians to bring forth the works of love." (Section 4.7 no. 37)

=== Different angle of approach ===
The declaration states that several theological views on justification held by Lutherans and Catholics, though not apparently similar to each other, are in fact explaining the same "basic truths of the doctrine of justification" at different angles.

An example can be cited from section 4.7 no. 38–39, "when Catholics affirm the 'meritorious' character of good works, they wish to say that, according to the biblical witness, a reward in heaven is promised to these works. Their intention is to emphasize the responsibility of persons for their actions, not to contest the character of those works as gifts, or far less to deny that justification always remains the unmerited gift of grace", in comparison with "the concept of a preservation of grace and a growth in grace and faith is also held by Lutherans. They do emphasize that righteousness as acceptance by God and sharing in the righteousness of Christ is always complete. At the same time, they state that there can be growth in its effects in Christian living. When they view the good works of Christians as the fruits and signs of justification and not as one's own 'merits', they nevertheless also understand eternal life in accord with the New Testament as unmerited 'reward' in the sense of the fulfillment of God's promise to the believer."

=== Uptake ===
In July 2006 the World Methodist Council, representing 70 million Wesleyan Christians, including The United Methodist Church, "signed on" to (or affirmed) the Joint Declaration on Justification between Roman Catholics and the Lutheran World Federation.

In 2016, the Anglican Consultative Committee, representing 85 million Anglicans, issued resolution 16.17

In 2017, the World Communion of Reformed Churches, representing 80 million members of Congregational, Presbyterian, Reformed, United, Uniting and Waldensian churches affirmed the Joint Declaration.

The Lutheran World Federation represents around 77 million Christians. The Catholic Church represents around 1.4 billion Christians. As of 2022, this tallies to about 1.7 billion people associated with communions that have affirmed the Joint Declaration, or 75% of all Christians worldwide.

Other Lutherans, especially Confessional Lutherans, maintain that this agreement fails to properly define the meaning of faith, sin, and other essential terms and thus do not support the Lutheran World Federation's agreement. Likewise, some Catholics affirming real and serious differences between the decrees of the Council of Trent and the normative Lutheran documents collected in the 1580 Book of Concord equally reject the 1999 "JDDJ" as fatally flawed.

== Comparison of traditions ==
Christian traditions answer questions about the nature, function and meaning of justification quite differently. These issues include: Is justification an event occurring instantaneously or is it as an ongoing process? Is justification effected by divine action alone (monergism), by divine and human action together (synergism) or by human action? Is justification permanent or can it be lost? What is the relationship of justification to sanctification, the process whereby sinners become righteous and are enabled by the Holy Spirit to live lives pleasing to God?

Tradition	Process or Event	Type of Action	Permanence	Justification and Sanctification
Roman Catholic	Both event and process	Synergism	Can be lost via any mortal sin	Part of the same process
Lutheran	Event that is continuously renewed in Word and Sacrament	Divine monergism	Can be lost via loss of faith or mortal sin	Distinct from and cause of sanctification
Methodist	Event	Synergism	Can be lost via loss of faith or willful sin	Distinct from yet always accompanied by sanctification
Eastern Orthodox	Process	Synergism	Can be lost via loss of faith or willful sin	Part of the same process (theosis)
Calvinist	Event	Divine monergism	Cannot be lost	Both are a result of union with Christ

Protestants, Catholics, Eastern Orthodox, and Oriental Orthodox Christians together believe that justification is by grace through faith, though they differ on the relationship between faith, obedience, and justification.

Protestants believe justification is applied through faith alone and that rather than being made personally righteous and obedient, which Protestants generally delegate to sanctification as a distinct reality, justification is a forensic declaration of the believer to possess the righteousness and obedience of Christ.

Catholics and Orthodox Christians believe that the obedience that flows from faith is the cause of increase in justification; holding justification to be an ontological process of being truly made righteous by union and cooperation with Christ and also believe they are justified by God's grace which is a free gift received through baptism initially, through the faith which works by love in the continuous life and growth of the Christian and through the sacrament of reconciliation if the grace of justification is lost through mortal sin. For the Catholic and Orthodox Christian, justification and sanctification are different ways of speaking of the same reality, rather than positing an actual distinction between the two.

=== Catholic Church ===
To Catholics, justification is "a translation, from that state wherein man is born a child of the first Adam, to the state of grace, and of the adoption of the sons of God, through the second Adam, Jesus Christ, our Savior", including the transforming of a sinner from the state of unrighteousness to the state of holiness. This transformation is made possible by accessing the merit of Christ, made available in the atonement, through faith and the sacraments. The Catholic Church teaches that "faith without works is dead" and that works perfect faith.

In Catholic theology, all are born in a state of original sin, meaning that the sinful nature of Adam is inherited by all. Following Augustine, the Catholic Church asserts that people are unable to make themselves righteous; instead, they require justification.

Catholic theology holds that the sacrament of baptism, which is closely connected to faith, "purifies, justifies and sanctifies" the sinner; in this sacrament, the sinner is "freed from sin". This is termed initial justification or "being cleansed of sin", the entrance into the Christian life. Catholics use Mark 16:16, John 3:5, Acts 2:38, and 1 Peter 3:21 to support this view in justification by baptism.

As the individual then progresses in his Christian life, he continues to receive God's grace both directly through the Holy Spirit as well as through the sacraments. This has the effect of combating sin in the individual's life, causing him to become more righteous both in heart and in action. If one falls into mortal sin he loses his justification and it can be gained back through the sacrament of confession.

At the Resurrection those believers who died in a state of grace but with some venial sins will have been purged of these excessive creaturely attachments. As part of the following Final Judgment, the saved individual's works will then be evaluated for their reward.

In the Council of Trent, which Catholics believe to be infallible, the Catholic Church declared in the VII session in canon IV (countering the view that sacraments are superfluous and therefore to be eschewed as unnecessary) that, "If anyone says that the sacraments of the New Law are not necessary for salvation but are superfluous, and that without them or without the desire of them men obtain from God through faith alone the grace of justification, though all [sacraments] are not necessary for each one [person], let him be anathema."

Anglican John Henry Newman's 1838 Lectures on the Doctrine of Justification (re-issued as a Catholic in 1879) sought to align the Protestant and Catholic understanding of Justification, writing in terms of the Catholic tradition of "et...et..." (i.e., "both ... and ...") that righteousness was both imputed and infused (he suggested the term "adhered".)

=== Eastern Christianity ===
Eastern Christianity, including both Eastern Orthodoxy and Oriental Orthodoxy, tends to not have a strong emphasis on justification as compared to Catholicism or Protestantism, seeing it as part of the concept of "theosis"; justification is often viewed by Eastern theologians as too highly forensic and they reject it. The Greek term for justification (δικαίωσις, dikaiōsis) is not understood by most Eastern theologians to mean simply being pardoned of one's sins. In large part, this de-emphasis on justification is historical. The Eastern church sees humanity as inheriting the disease of sin from Adam, but not his guilt; hence, there is no need in Eastern theology for any forensic justification.

The Orthodox see salvation as a process of theosis, in which the individual is united to Christ and the life of Christ is reproduced within him. Thus, in one sense, justification is an aspect of theosis. However, it is also the case that those who are baptized into the church and experience Chrismation are considered to be cleansed of sin. Hence, the Orthodox concept of justification cannot be reconciled to Protestant concepts, while it is in partial agreement with some Roman Catholic concepts. In the words of one Orthodox Bishop:

Justification is a word used in the Scriptures to mean that in Christ we are forgiven and actually made righteous in our living. Justification is not a once-for-all, instantaneous pronouncement guaranteeing eternal salvation, regardless of how wickedly a person might live from that point on. Neither is it merely a legal declaration that an unrighteous person is righteous. Rather, justification is a living, dynamic, day-to-day reality for the one who follows Christ. The Christian actively pursues a righteous life in the grace and power of God granted to all who continue to believe in Him.

— Bishop Alexander

"The Holy Spirit effects the vocation, the illumination, the conversion, the justification, the rebirth in Baptism and the sanctification in the Church..."

=== Anabaptism ===
Anabaptist theology emphasizes a "faith that works"; Anabaptists teach that "justification [began] a dynamic process by which the believer partook of the nature of Christ and was so enabled to live increasingly like Jesus."

Anabaptist cleric David Griffin writes:

For early Anabaptists, sola fide muted the call to imitate Christ by excusing anti-Christian behavior generally, and justifying violence towards fellow Christians in particular. True fide, it was argued, takes Christ both as savior and example. That is, faith is directed not just to the soteriological work of Christ's death, but also towards his exemplary human life. Faith accepts that because Christ's earthly life pleased God, it is normative for proper human experience. Consequently, early Anabaptism expected an affirmative answer to two basic questions: 1) "Do you believe that Christ bore your sins?" and 2) "Do you believe that Jesus' human life, which pleased God, should be copied?"

— Griffin

Menno Simons wrote in his "Confession of the Distressed Christians" that salvation was not in "works, words or sacraments" but are found only in Christ. In 1539 he wrote the qualities of this faith; " true evangelical faith... cannot lay dormant; but manifests itself in all righteousness and works of love; it... clothes the naked; feeds the hungry; consoles the afflicted; shelters the miserable; aids and consoles all the oppressed; returns good for evil; serves those that injure it; prays for those that persecute it." Balthasar Hubmaier wrote in "Eighteen Thesis Concerning the Christian Life" that "Faith alone makes us righteous before God" but further added that "such faith cannot remain idle, but must break forth in gratitude toward God and in all sorts of works of brotherly love toward others." Pilgram Marpeck similarly wrote that the sinner was justified by faith and also that, "If God... liberates him (the sinner) from the bonds, cords, and power of the devil, and if Christ lives in him again through His Holy Spirit, he is justified through Christ and no longer a sinner. His sins and the stain of his wickedness have been washed away and cleansed through the blood of Christ, and God does not hold sin against him". Justification for Marpeck is, in a word, liberation—namely, the liberation from the powers of darkness.

=== Lutheranism ===
Justification occupies a primary position for Lutherans in the "hierarchy of truth": they believe justification by grace alone through faith alone in Christ's righteousness alone is the gospel, the core of the Christian faith around which all other Christian doctrines are centered and based, and according to which the scriptures must be read and the church understood.

"This one and firm rock, which we call the doctrine of justification", insisted Martin Luther, "is the chief article of the whole Christian doctrine, which comprehends the understanding of all godliness." He also called this doctrine the articulus stantis et cadentis ecclesiae ("article of the standing and falling of the church"): "...if this article stands, the Church stands; if it falls, the Church falls." Lutherans follow Luther in this when they call this doctrine "the material principle" of theology in relation to the Bible, which is "the formal principle."

From 1510 to 1520, Luther lectured on the Psalms, the books of Hebrews, Romans, and Galatians. As he studied these portions of the Bible, he came to view the use of terms such as penance and righteousness by the Catholic Church in new ways. He became convinced that the Church was corrupt in its ways and had lost sight of what he saw as several of the central truths of Christianity, the most important of which, for Luther, was the doctrine of justification—God's act of declaring a sinner righteous—by faith alone through God's grace.

Luther came to understand justification as entirely the work of God. When God's righteousness is mentioned in the gospel, it is God's action of declaring righteous the unrighteous sinner who has faith in Jesus Christ. The righteousness by which the person is justified (declared righteous) is not his own (theologically, proper righteousness) but that of another, Christ, (alien righteousness). "That is why faith alone makes someone just and fulfills the law", said Luther. "Faith is that which brings the Holy Spirit through the merits of Christ". Thus faith, for Luther, is a gift from God, and "...a living, bold trust in God's grace, so certain of God's favor that it would risk death a thousand times trusting in it." This faith grasps Christ's righteousness and appropriates it for the believer. He explained his concept of "justification" in the Smalcald Articles:

The first and chief article is this: Jesus Christ, our God and Lord, died for our sins and was raised again for our justification (Romans 3:24-25). He alone is the Lamb of God who takes away the sins of the world (John 1:29), and God has laid on Him the iniquity of us all (Isaiah 53:6). All have sinned and are justified freely, without their own works and merits, by His grace, through the redemption that is in Christ Jesus, in His blood (Romans 3:23-25). This is necessary to believe. This cannot be otherwise acquired or grasped by any work, law or merit. Therefore, it is clear and certain that this faith alone justifies us ... Nothing of this article can be yielded or surrendered, even though heaven and earth and everything else falls (Mark 13:31).

— Concordia: The Lutheran Confessions

Traditionally, Lutherans have taught "forensic" (or legal) justification, a divine verdict of acquittal pronounced on the believing sinner. God declares the sinner to be "not guilty" because Christ has taken his place, living a perfect life according to God's law and suffering for his sins. For Lutherans justification is in no way dependent upon the thoughts, words, and deeds of those justified through faith alone in Christ. The new obedience that the justified sinner renders to God through sanctification follows justification as a consequence, but is not part of justification.

Lutherans believe that individuals receive this gift of salvation through faith alone. Saving faith is the knowledge of, acceptance of, and trust in the promise of the Gospel. Even faith itself is seen as a gift of God, created in the hearts of Christians by the work of the Holy Spirit through the Word and Baptism. Faith is seen as an instrument that receives the gift of salvation, not something that causes salvation. Thus, Lutherans reject the "decision theology" which is common among modern evangelicals, such as Baptists and Methodists.

For Lutherans, justification provides the power by which Christians can grow in holiness and do good works (cf. sanctification). Such improvement comes about in the believer only after he has become a new creation in Christ. This improvement is not completed in this life: Christians are always "saint and sinner at the same time" (simul iustus et peccator)—saints because they are holy in God's eyes, for Christ's sake, and do works that please him; sinners because they continue to sin until death.

=== Reformed/Calvinist ===
Soteriologically, Reformed Christianity includes the Continental Reformed, Presbyterian, Congregationalist and Anglican traditions, as well as their offshoots such as Particular Baptists & other Calvinistic Evangelicals. John Calvin's understanding of justification was in substantial agreement with Martin Luther's. Calvin expanded this understanding by emphasizing that justification is a part of one's union with Christ. The center of Calvin's soteriology was Union with Christ. For Calvin, one is united to Christ by faith, and all of the benefits of Christ come from being united to him. Therefore, anyone who is justified will also receive all of the benefits of salvation, including sanctification. Thus, while Calvin agreed in substance with the "simultaneously saint and sinner" formulation, he was more definite in asserting that the result of being justified is a consequent sanctification. Calvin also used more definite language than Luther, spelling out the exchange notion of imputed righteousness: that the good works that Jesus did in his life (collectively referred to as the active obedience of Christ) are imputed to his people, while their sins were imputed to him on the cross.

For Calvin, Adam and Jesus functioned as federal heads, or legal representatives, meaning that each one represented his people through his actions. When Adam sinned, all of Adam's people were accounted to have sinned at that moment. When Jesus achieved righteousness, all of his people were accounted to be righteous at that moment. In this way Calvin attempted to simultaneously solve the problems of original sin, justification, and atonement.

Some of the technical details of this union with Christ are tied into Calvin's understanding of the atonement and of predestination.

One outcome of Calvin's change in center over against Luther was that he saw justification as a permanent feature of being connected to Christ: since, for Calvin, people are attached to Christ monergistically, it is therefore impossible for them to lose justification if indeed they were once justified. This idea was expressed by the Synod of Dort as the "perseverance of the saint."

At present, the Reformed tradition includes different theological views, including Auburn Avenue Theology (Federal Vision Theology), which distinguishes between initial justification by faith alone and final justification "through faith and works or faith and faithfulness." Likewise, in the sacrament of baptism, Auburn Avenue Theology holds that "all the benefits of Christ (i.e., election, effectual calling, regeneration, faith, union with Christ, and adoption) are given but must be retained by grace and cooperation with grace."

=== Anglicanism ===
In historic Anglicanism, the eleventh article of the Thirty-Nine Articles, consistent with Reformed theology, makes it clear that justification cannot be earned, "We are accounted righteous before God... not for our own works or deservings". The Most Rev. Peter Robinson, presiding bishop of the United Episcopal Church of North America, writes:

The 42 Articles of 1552 and the 39 Articles of 1563, both commit the Church of England to the fundamentals of the Reformed Faith. Both sets of Articles affirm the centrality of Scripture, and take a monergist position on Justification. Both sets of Articles affirm that the Church of England accepts the doctrine of predestination and election as a 'comfort to the faithful' but warn against over much speculation concerning that doctrine. Indeed a casual reading of the Wurttemburg Confession of 1551, the Second Helvetic Confession, the Scots Confession of 1560, and the XXXIX Articles of Religion reveal them to be cut from the same bolt of cloth.

— Peter Robinson, The Reformed Face of Anglicanism

At the time of the Protestant Reformation in England, Thomas Cranmer, the architect who shaped the foundational Anglican formularies—The Thirty-nine Articles of Religion, Books of Homilies and Book of Common Prayer—"fully integrated justification sola fide et sola gratia into the doctrine and worship of the Church of England." Cranmer's "Homily on Salvation", which was regularly read in every parish of the Church of England, "make the [Reformed] Protestant understanding of justification normative for Anglican doctrine (Articles 9-14, 17, 22)."

Some Anglo-Catholics believe both man and God are involved in justification. "Justification has an objective and a subjective aspect. The objective is the act of God in Christ restoring the covenant and opening it to all people. The subjective aspect is faith, trust in the divine factor, acceptance of divine mercy. Apart from the presence of the subjective aspect there is no justification. People are not justified apart from their knowledge or against their will.... God forgives and accepts sinners as they are into the divine fellowship, and that these sinners are in fact changed by their trust in the divine mercy." Justification, the establishment of a relationship with God through Christ, and sanctification go hand in hand. Certain Anglican theologians (especially Anglo-Catholics) argue for a faith characterized by faithfulness, where good works and the Sacraments play important roles in the life of the Christian believer. (see New Perspective on Paul)

=== Arminianism/Methodism ===
John Wesley, the founder of Methodism, was heavily influenced by the thought of Dutch Reformed theologian Jacob Arminius and Hugo Grotius' governmental theory of the atonement. Hence, he held that God's work in us consisted of prevenient grace, which undoes the effects of sin sufficiently that we may then freely choose to believe. An individual's act of faith then results in becoming part of the body of Christ, which allows one to appropriate Christ's atonement for oneself, erasing the guilt of sin. According to the Articles of Religion in the Book of Discipline of the Methodist Church:

We are accounted righteous before God only for the merit of our Lord and Saviour Jesus Christ, by faith, and not for our own works or deservings. Wherefore, that we are justified by faith only is a most wholesome doctrine, and very full of comfort.

— The Articles of Religion of the Methodist Church, Article IX – Of the Justification of Man

Methodist theology teaches that justification and regeneration occur during the New Birth:

Though these two phases of the new birth occur simultaneously, they are, in fact, two separate and distinct acts. Justification is that gracious and judicial act of God whereby a soul is granted complete absolution from all guilt and a full release from the penalty of sin (Romans 3:23-25). This act of divine grace is wrought by faith in the merits of our Lord and Saviour Jesus Christ (Romans 5:1). Regeneration is the impartation of divine life which is manifested in that radical change in the moral character of man, from the love and life of sin to the love of God and the life of righteousness (2 Corinthians 5:17; 1 Peter 1:23).

— Guidebook of the Emmanuel Association of Churches, Principles of Faith, Emmanuel Association of Churches

However, once the individual has been so justified, one must then continue in the new life given; if one fails to persevere in the faith and in fact falls away from God in total unbelief, the attachment to Christ – and with it, justification – may be lost.

=== Restorationism ===
==== Latter-day Saints (Mormons) ====
The Church of Jesus Christ of Latter-day Saints (LDS Church) believes that while justification is a gift from God, the recipient must choose it through striving to do good works to the extent possible. The Second Book of Nephi states "...it is by grace that we are saved, after all we can do." In LDS theology, justification is not earned through good works, but rather chosen by striving to rid one's life of sin. This allows God to rescue his children from sin while not infringing on their agency.

==== The New Church (Emanuel Swedenborg) ====
According to the doctrine of The New Church, as explained by Emanuel Swedenborg, the doctrine of justification by faith alone is a false belief which forms the foundation of much of Protestant theology. "Man must of his own volition justify himself, and yet believe that justification comes from God only. Not only must man believe in God, but must love God with all his strength, and his neighbor as himself." "Inasmuch as man obeys God's commandment to love others, so God conjoins himself to man, and man to God. It is from this that man's belief becomes a living and saving belief." "It is by means of faith from charity, that a man is reformed and justified, and this is done as if from himself, and this proceeds from the Divine Truth which flows in from the Holy Spirit."

=== Universalists ===
Universalism became a significant minority view in the 18th century, popularized by thinkers such as John Murray (the American, not the Scot). Universalism holds that Christ's death on the cross has entirely atoned for the sin of humanity; hence, God's wrath is or will be satisfied for all people. Conservative and liberal varieties of universalism then point in different directions. Pluralistic Unitarian Universalism asserts that many different religions all lead to God. Others teach that God's love is sufficient to cover for sins, thus embracing some form of the moral influence theory of Peter Abelard. For some universalists, justification either was accomplished once and for all in the crucifixion, or is altogether unnecessary.

== Interactions between various doctrines ==
=== Sola fide ===
Luther's reformulation of justification introduced the phrase sola fide, or "by faith alone". That phrase has been one of the uniting factors among various Protestant denominations; despite the wide variety of doctrines and practices among Protestants, they all agree that one is saved (often meaning "justified") by faith alone.

=== New Perspectives on Paul ===
A range of Protestant scholars such as E.P. Sanders, N.T. Wright, and James Dunn, have attempted a re-thinking of the historical Protestant understanding of justification. They argue that Paul's letters have too often been read through the lens of the Protestant Reformation rather than in the context of first-century Second Temple Judaism, and therefore impose a religion of legalism on their understanding of Pharisaism. This view has been criticized by a number of Reformed ministers and theologians including John Piper, D.A. Carson, and Sinclair Ferguson.

Anglican bishop N.T. Wright has written extensively on the topic of justification. Some evangelicals concerned with his view of justification worry that he marginalizes the importance of the penal substitutionary transaction that takes place at salvation.

== See also ==
- Bibliography for Justification (theology)
- Christian views on the Old Covenant
- Conditional security
- Expounding of the Law
- Imparted righteousness
- Irresistible grace
- Joint Declaration on the Doctrine of Justification
- Justification from eternity
- Law and Gospel
- Mortal sin
- Paul the Apostle and Jewish Christianity
- Sanctification in Christianity
- Sacrament of Reconciliation (Catholic Church)
- Salvation in Christianity
