= Wesleyan theology =

Protestant Christian theological tradition

Wesleyan theology, also known as Wesleyan–Arminian theology or Wesleyan Methodist theology, is a Protestant theological tradition based upon the ministry and writings of the 18th-century English evangelical reformers John Wesley and Charles Wesley. More broadly, it refers to the theological system reflected in the sermons, theological treatises, letters, journals, diaries, hymns, and other writings of the Wesleys and their contemporary associates. A notable figure among these associates was John William Fletcher, who was particularly influential as an early systematic theologian of early Methodism.

Methodism developed into a distinct theological tradition characterized by an emphasis on a deeply experiential faith. John Wesley, in particular, was deeply influenced by the Moravian Christians, an influence that contributed to his transformative Aldersgate experience in 1738. Although Methodism originated as a renewal movement within the Church of England, it eventually diverged from Anglicanism to form a distinct tradition. It places particular emphasis on the New Birth and personal holiness, while calling believers to continual growth in grace and to an experiential assurance of the work of the Holy Spirit.

A distinctive hallmark of Wesleyan theology is its definition of sin as a voluntary transgression of a known law of God. Methodist doctrine teaches that the Christian life subsequent to conversion should be characterized by victory over willful sin. It also emphasizes entire sanctification, understood as the complete purification of the heart in perfect love, as a central distinctive of the Methodist tradition. Grounded in the primary authority of Scripture and historic Christological orthodoxy, John Wesley revised the Thirty-nine Articles to remove its Calvinistic theological leanings and articulate an Arminian soteriology centered on unlimited atonement, prevenient grace, human free will, as well as conditional preservation.

== Historical context and emergence ==
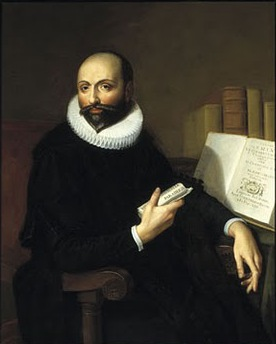
James Arminius, Krzysztof Lubieniecki, c. 1705.

Wesleyan–Arminianism developed as an attempt to articulate Christian soteriology in direct contrast to the absolute predestinarian teachings associated with classical Calvinism. The broader theological movement of Arminianism originated in the Netherlands with Jacobus Arminius, who challenged Calvinist orthodoxy by defending human free will as being enabled and sustained by prevenient grace. In 1610, following the death of Arminius, his dedicated followers presented the Five Articles of Remonstrance to the States of Holland. These individuals were historically known as the Remonstrants, and they were led by Simon Episcopius.

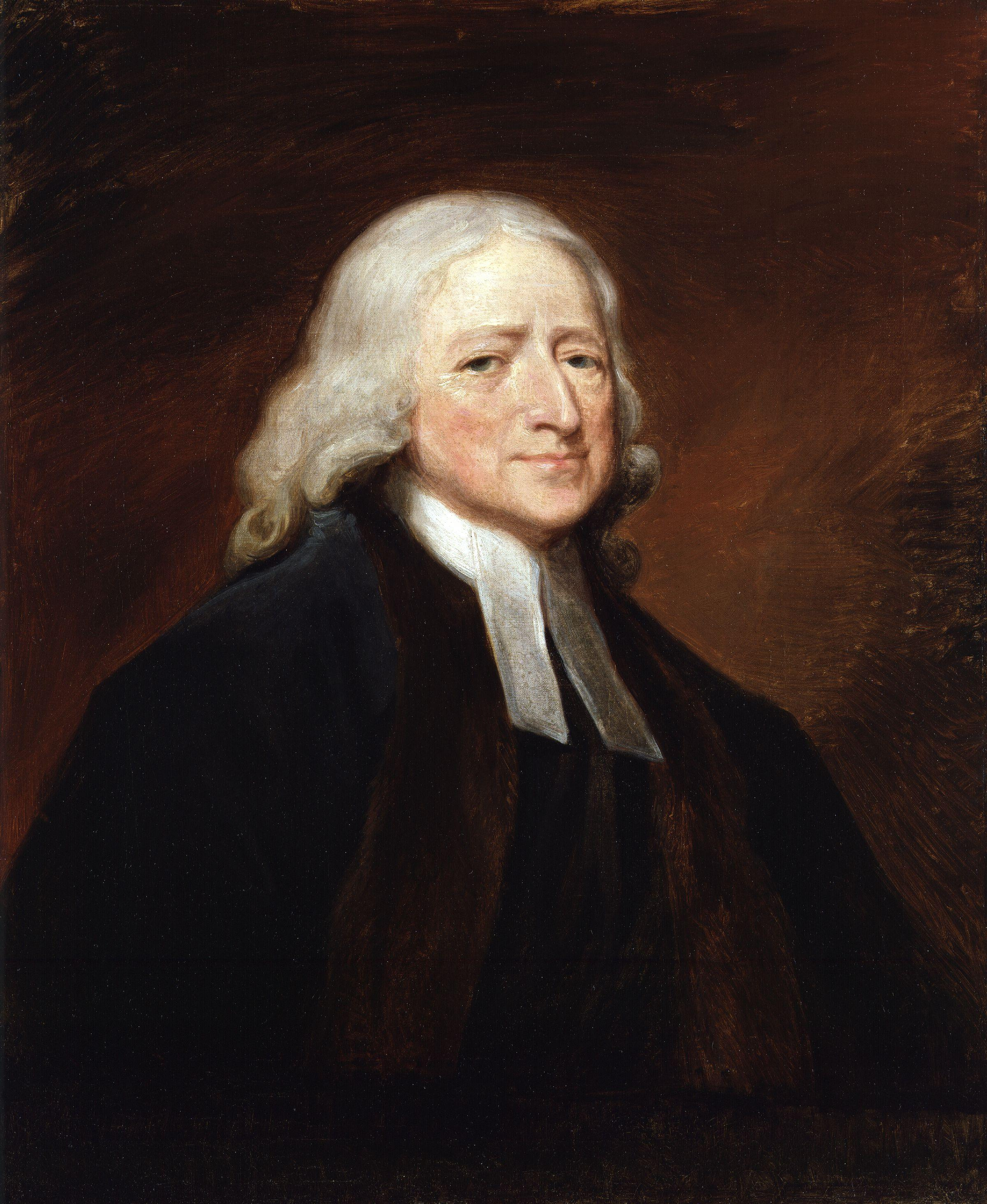
John Wesley, George Romney, 1789.

Wesleyan theology, on the other hand, developed from the teachings of John Wesley, an Anglican priest and evangelist. Its theological principles are derived from his many publications, including his collected sermons, journal, abridgements of theological, devotional, and historical Christian works, and a variety of tracts and treatises on theological subjects. Subsequently, the two traditions have joined into a cohesive theological framework for the contemporary church.

In 1736, the Wesley brothers traveled to the Georgia colony in America as missionaries, but they returned discouraged by their experience there. Both subsequently had profound religious experiences, but John Wesley, in particular, was deeply influenced by the Moravian Christians, a pietistic group that contributed to his transformative Aldersgate experience in 1738. Although Methodism originated as a renewal movement within the Church of England to spread what Wesley called scriptural holiness across the land and although Wesley initially did not intend to form a separate denomination, Methodism eventually diverged into its own separate tradition. This distinct tradition emphasized "heart religion", particularly the experiential realities of the New Birth, personal holiness, and the assurance of the Holy Spirit.

During the 1770s, John Wesley defended Arminian doctrines in public controversies against prominent Calvinistic evangelicals in England. He was supported by his close associate John William Fletcher, now regarded as the systematic theologian of Wesleyan Methodism. In 1778, Wesley founded the Arminian Magazine, reinforcing the theological link between Wesleyan theology and Arminian soteriology. Although Arminianism had faced significant institutional opposition in Europe, Wesley's campaign against Calvinism succeeded where Arminius's own efforts had not. In the United States especially, Arminianism became a dominant soteriological position within Evangelical Protestantism, spread largely through popular preaching during the Great Awakenings. Though Wesley did not draw his theology directly from Arminius's own writings, he adopted the label "Arminian" to distinguish his followers' Evangelicalism from that of their Calvinist opponents. Many consider the most accurate term for Wesleyan theology to be "Evangelical Arminianism".

To support his position, Wesley affirmed the doctrine of total depravity. Wesley, Fletcher, and Watson described the natural corruption resulting from Adam's fall in terms as stark as those of Augustine, Luther, and Calvin. At the same time, he also emphasized the universal scope of prevenient grace. Wesleyan Arminianism is regarded as a closely related development of Classical Arminian theology essentially adding Christian perfectionism to it. It also places greater emphasis on the subjective experience of conversion and regeneration through the new birth. Accordingly, Methodist preaching give greater weight to the immediate and transformative work of the Holy Spirit in conversion, reflecting a stronger practical focus on evangelism.

Methodism also developed distinctive theological positions concerning the role of human agency in salvation. In the 1830s, during the Second Great Awakening, critics accused the Holiness Movement of Pelagian teaching. Consequently, detractors of Wesleyan theology have occasionally characterized the broader Wesleyan tradition in these terms. Mainstream Wesleyan theology, however, firmly rejected such charges, maintaining instead a distinctly Arminian soteriology centered on the absolute necessity of prevenient grace for any human response to salvation.

== Core theological doctrines ==
=== Human nature, free will, and sin ===
Wesleyan Methodist theology strongly teaches the foundational doctrine of human free will, affirming that God's unmerited grace dynamically restores human agency. This profound grace makes salvation attainable for every single person who comes into the world. If individuals are ultimately not saved, the fault lies entirely in their own willful refusal and stubborn rebellion.

A distinctive hallmark of Wesleyan theology is its precise definition of sin as a voluntary transgression of a currently known law of God. This concept was heavily influenced by historic church teachings, with Wesley famously aligning his views with Augustine to assert that every sin is fundamentally linked to human volition. This narrower, more precise definition of sin is a fundamental, unifying belief shared widely across modern Methodist denominations, including those aligned with the holiness movement. For example, the Wesleyan Holiness Association of Churches explicitly emphasizes that such willful, conscious sin firmly condemns a soul to eternal punishment. This severe punishment remains inevitable unless the sinner is mercifully pardoned by God through active repentance, deep confession, and personal faith.

Wesleyan Methodism carefully and consistently distinguishes between original sin, which refers to the deeply inherited corruption of human nature, and actual sin, which specifically comprises personal, conscious transgressions committed actively before regeneration. Actual sin is further bifurcated theologically into two distinct categories. The first is sin properly so called, which involves willful, conscious disobedience against God's known commands. The second category, sin improperly so called, accounts for natural human infirmities. These complex infirmities specifically include physical handicaps, profound ignorance, immaturity, forgetfulness, a lack of discernment, and poor communication skills. Wesley firmly maintained that involuntary mistakes do not constitute sin in the proper, theological sense. Consequently, Wesleyan doctrine powerfully affirms that believers can and must live absolutely free from outward, willful sin following regeneration (the first work of grace); through the second work of grace—entire sanctification, Christians are able to be made perfect in love and are freed from the sin nature of humanity, i.e. original sin.

=== Atonement and grace ===
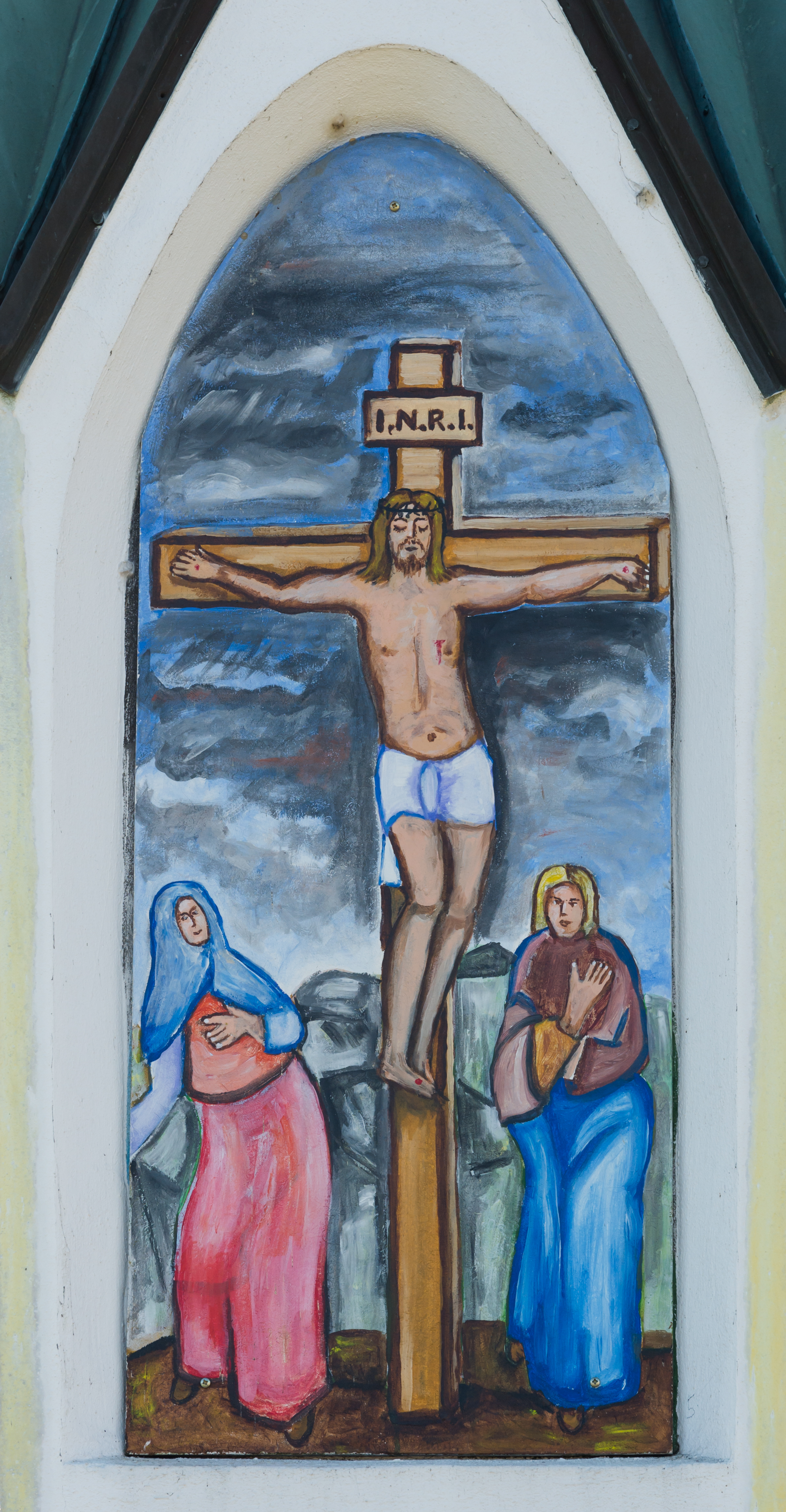
Wesleyan theology teaches the doctrine of unlimited atonement, holding that Christ died for all humanity.

Wesleyan theology firmly adheres to the historic doctrine of penal substitutionary atonement, yet it also expands this traditional view by integrating it with themes drawn from Christus Victor and insights from moral influence theories. Wesley held that Christ's voluntary sacrifice successfully satisfied divine justice, appeasing God's righteous wrath against human transgression while simultaneously breaking the oppressive power of Satan over fallen humanity. He viewed this victorious rescue from evil as an integral component of substitutionary atonement.

Wesleyans have also defended a distinct form of substitutionary atonement. In this view, reconciliation with God is based on forgiveness made possible through an atonement grounded in the governmental theory. In this approach, Jesus is not strictly punished in the place of human beings. Nevertheless, his sufferings constitute an expiation intended to satisfy divine justice. This universal provision of forgiveness is received through faith in God and repentance from sin.

Charles Wesley's hymns frequently combine these substitutionary motifs with the transformative moral impact of divine love. Through these hymns, he invites the believer to enter mystically and participatively into the suffering and crucifixion of Christ.

"Vouchsafe us eyes of faith to see / The Man transfixed on Calvary, / To know thee, who thou art [...] Destroy the love of sin in me, / And get thyself the victory, / And bring me back to God [...] And lo! I come thy cross to share, / Echo thy sacrificial prayer, / And with my Saviour die."

In the administration of the Lord's Supper, the Methodist believer experiences this participatory dimension especially through the sacramental elements, which mystically transport them to the foot of the cross.

Wesleyans emphatically teach unlimited atonement, maintaining that Christ died a loving, propitiatory death for all human beings without exception. Regarding the fate of the unlearned, Methodist theology offers a notably inclusive and distinct perspective on grace. It affirms that infants, morally incapable persons, and individuals who have never heard the historical Gospel may nevertheless be graciously accepted by God. This acceptance is grounded entirely in the infinite merits of Christ, provided that these individuals respond faithfully to the natural light and grace they have received in their unique contexts.

=== Justification, regeneration, and the new birth ===
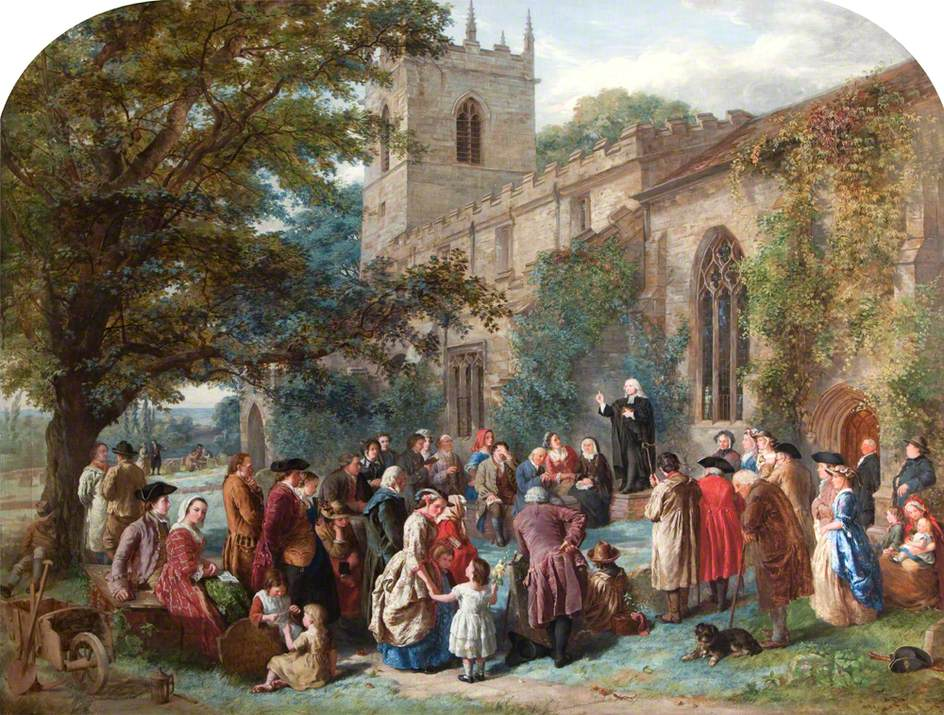
John Wesley open-air preaching to a crowd gathered at Epworth

In Wesleyan soteriology, the practical order of salvation encompasses a conviction of sin, genuine repentance, and practical, restitution. These preparatory steps are to lead the awakened soul to saving faith, divine justification, spiritual regeneration, and adoption. This initial salvation experience is then followed by a lifelong, dynamic process of progressive sanctification. this continuous progression aims toward the subsequent, higher experience of entire sanctification.It Is said God universally extends prevenient grace to all people, a grace which serves to restore human moral agency. This grace is to empower the individual to respond to or reject salvation. This dynamic establishes a framework of synergistic cooperation between God and humanity.

Justification is defined strictly as a judicial, declarative act of divine pardon, representing the complete forgiveness of sins. Through this gracious and unmerited act, the repentant soul is granted complete, liberating absolution from all past guilt. Regeneration, conversely, represents the profound and radical inward change wherein vibrant spiritual life is imparted directly to the believer. While justification specifically and legally confers imputed righteousness, sanctification powerfully and experientially conveys actual imparted righteousness. Through this ongoing process of impartation, the Holy Spirit actively and continuously works to restore the believer into the perfect, unblemished image of God.

Methodist doctrine insists that genuine, living saving faith inevitably yields tangible, visible good works in the world, and this natural fruit includes a steadfast and loving obedience to the overarching moral law of the Ten Commandments. Wesleyans assert that grace does not eliminate or invalidate the moral law. Rather, it empowers the believer to naturally fulfill it through active engagement in works of piety and works of mercy. Consequently, they teach that authentic faith simply cannot subsist without these outward, highly practical expressions of Christian Love. Within this theological tradition, justification remains entirely and constantly contingent upon continuing in a posture of faith and active obedience. A willful, sustained refusal to pursue holiness effectively and forfeits the believer's current state of grace. This ongoing, daily reliance on Christ for both initial faith and ultimate perseverance aligns Wesleyan soteriology very closely with the core concepts of Lordship salvation, emphasizing throughout that full, final salvation requires remaining rooted in a transformative, obedient relationship with God. This pursuit of holiness means that salvation not only involves ritual, but demands a fundamental change of heart and a completely different way of living.

The new birth constitutes the first major, dramatic work of grace in a believer's life, and this momentous spiritual event is marked simultaneously by the complete forgiveness of past sins, an inward spiritual regeneration, and a life-altering adoption into God's family. The Wesleyan tradition places primary emphasis on the new birth and personal holiness, viewing them as essential marks of genuine Christianity. Methodist preaching routinely emphasizes the vital, life-saving necessity of undergoing this profound spiritual transformation. Wesleyan theology holds that those truly born of God no longer commit willful, habitual sin as a normalized pattern of life. Nevertheless, newly justified believers remain conscious that corrupt, natural tendencies to depart from God still persist within their unpurified hearts. Should a believer fall into willful sin after regeneration, full spiritual restoration remains entirely possible. This process of recovery strictly requires sincere repentance, open confession, and a renewed, humble dependence on the forgiving grace of Christ.

=== Entire sanctification ===
Love Divine, All Loves Excelling
"Love Divine, All Loves Excelling", a hymn by Charles Wesley on Christian perfection.

Wesleyan theology teaches a second distinct work of grace in the life of the believer. This experience is widely termed entire sanctification or Christian perfection (cf. baptism with the Holy Spirit). The tradition upholds entire sanctification, meaning the purification of the heart so that it is made perfect in love, as the central deposit of the Methodist heritage. It acts as a divine intervention that cleanses the believer from original sin and eradicates the carnal nature. As a result, it fills the soul with love toward God and humanity, leaving no room for contrary affections. Through entire sanctification, Wesleyan Methodist doctrine teaches that the believer is empowered for service to God as the heart is no longer divided. John Wesley defined the nature of this experience directly:

"Entire sanctification, or Christian perfection, is neither more nor less than pure love; love expelling sin, and governing both the heart and life of a child of God. The Refiner's fire purges out all that is contrary to love."

Wesley taught that entire sanctification is received instantaneously by faith, though it is both preceded and followed by a path of growth in grace. Prior to receiving this grace, the believer is required to make a consecration of their life to God. This human side of sanctification involves surrendering all personal ambitions and selfish desires to the Lord. While entire sanctification frees the Christian from willful sin and the internal carnal mind, it does not render a person completely infallible. They remain entirely subject to natural human infirmities, honest cognitive errors, and external temptations throughout their earthly life.

=== Assurance and the witness of the Spirit ===
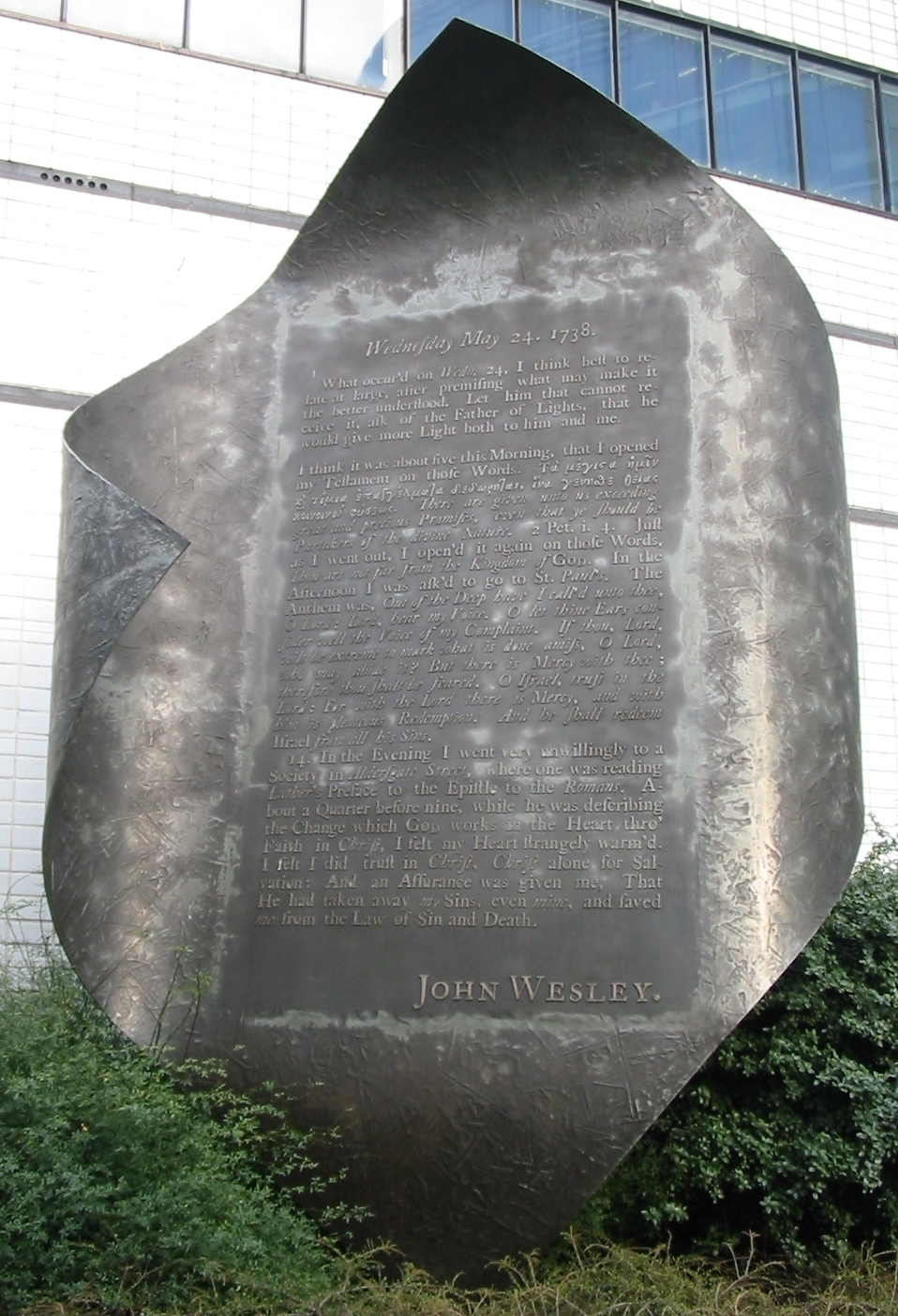
John Wesley memorial Aldersgate, 2016.

Wesleyans maintain that believers can enjoy an assurance of faith directly through the witness of the Spirit. This idea is based on the apostle Paul's teaching in the Epistle to the Romans, identifying a testimony assuring the believer of their adoption as a child of God. This presence confirms the realities of both initial justification and entire sanctification. The tradition also encourages a growth in grace and the assurance of the Holy Spirit. Wesley himself experienced this assurance during his Aldersgate encounter on 24 May 1738. He recorded feeling his heart strangely warmed and receiving the assurance that Christ had taken away his sins. This historical experience underscores that true religion is about an active relationship with God marked by holy living.

=== Conditional security and apostasy ===
Wesleyan theology affirms the doctrine of conditional preservation of the saints, commonly known in evangelical circles as conditional security. John Wesley defended this position in his 1751 treatise Serious Thoughts Upon the Perseverance of the Saints. He argued that believers remain secure in Christ only so long as they continue in faith and obedience. A Christian may commit apostasy by abandoning their faith, making a shipwreck of their calling. Additionally, a believer can fall from grace by returning to a life of unconfessed sin. Wesleyan framework generally recognizes that humans can lose and regain their state of grace. A backslider who has fallen from grace is not without hope, and he/she can be restored through repentance, confession, and faith in Jesus Christ. The backslidden individual would need to seek the first work of grace (the new birth) and second work of grace (entire sanctification) again, having lost these through willful sin.

=== Covenant theology ===
Methodism retains the historical framework of classical covenant theology, but it adapted this framework to a more Arminian perspective by eliminating its Reformed predestinarian assumptions. In Wesleyan covenant theology, the covenant of works terminated with the fall of Adam and Eve, while the covenant of grace was inaugurated for all of humanity. Consequently, all human beings are born under the universal provisions of the covenant of grace. The covenant of grace was administered through promises, sacrifices, and circumcision in the patriarchal era. It continued through the Mosaic law, and finally through the specific sacraments of Baptism and the Lord's Supper under the modern Gospel dispensation.

== Sources of authority and ecclesiology ==
=== The Wesleyan Quadrilateral ===
Wesleyan theology recognizes four sources of theological authority. These sources are structured in what 20th-century scholar Albert Outler designated as the Wesleyan Quadrilateral: Scripture, tradition, reason, and experience. The tradition adheres to prima scriptura, holding that the Bible is the primary authority for all Christian doctrine and salvation.

In this methodological approach, tradition serves to illumine Scripture. Concurrently, human reason enables the interpretation of theological concepts. Finally, Christian experience vitalizes and confirms biblical truth directly in the believer's life. Wesleyan theology also affirms the ancient ecumenical creeds and the historic Christological orthodoxy of the first five centuries of church history. In his revision of the Anglican Thirty-nine Articles for the American church, Wesley established the twenty-five Articles of Religion. During this process, he eliminated distinctively Calvinistic tenets regarding unconditional election, the perseverance of the saints, and the limitation of divine grace.

=== Ecclesiology, holy orders, and evangelism ===
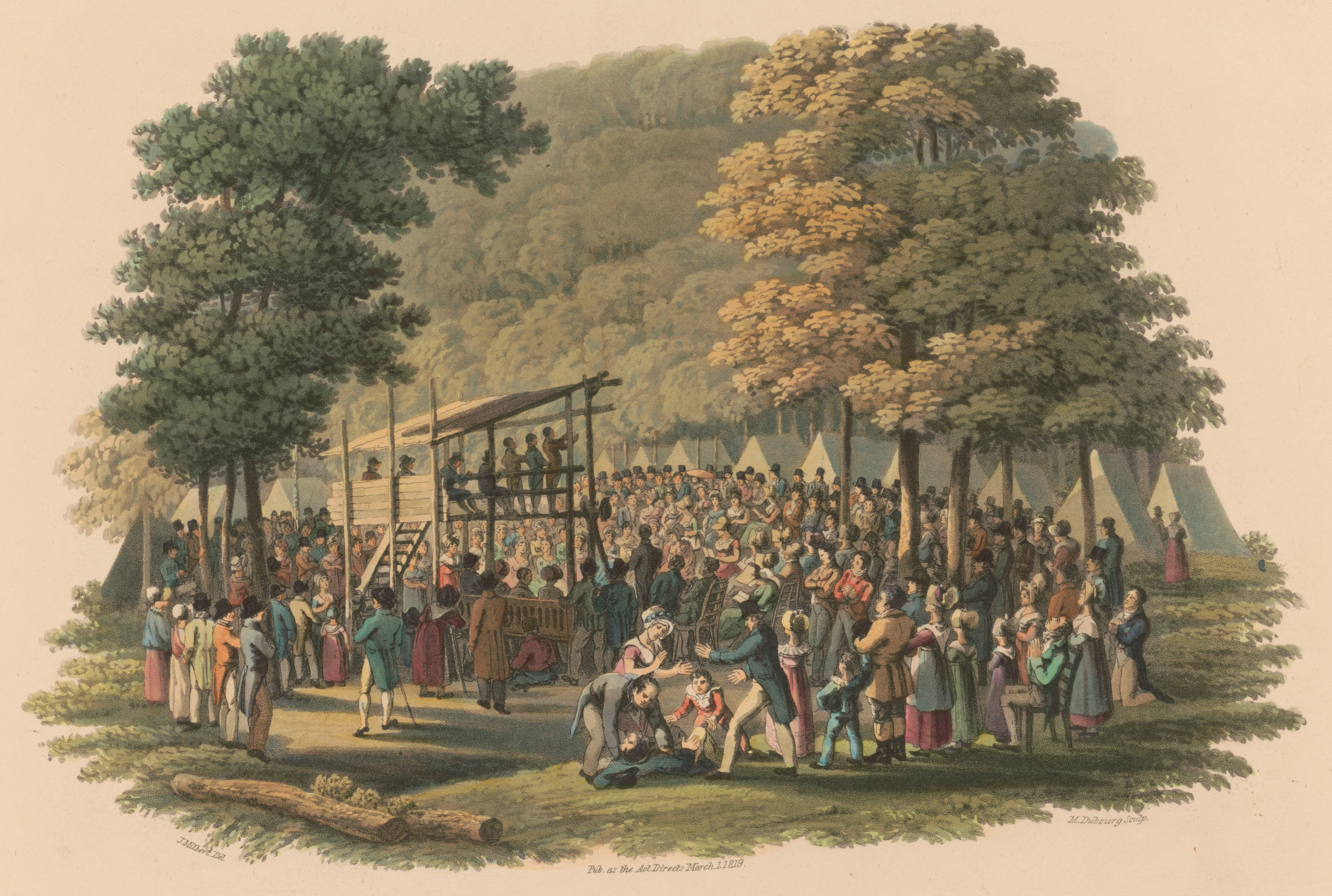
Camp meeting of the Methodists in N. America, M. Dubourg, 1819.

Methodists affirm a belief in the one holy catholic and apostolic Church, and they regard their own denominations as branches of Christ's broader universal church. Initially, Wesley did not intend to found a new denomination, but established Methodist societies as a renewal movement within the Church of England, functioning as a church within a church. Furthermore, John Wesley maintained that God had a missional purpose in raising up the Methodist movement, noting that its development was no human endeavor but the work of God that would be preserved. He identified the propagation of the doctrine of entire sanctification as the movement's principal theological deposit, holding that spreading this message of scriptural holiness was the reason the Methodists existed as a people in the world.

Regarding holy orders, Wesley held that bishops and presbyters constitute a single clerical order possessing ministerial authority to ordain. To support this view, he cited the practice of the Church of Alexandria. He also found justification for this view within the New Testament scriptures. Following the American Revolutionary War, the Bishop of London refused to ordain clergy for the growing Methodist societies in North America. This created a sacramental deprivation, as American Methodists could no longer receive Baptism or the Lord's Supper. Faced with this emergency, Wesley exercised his own presbyteral authority in 1784. Relying on the Alexandrian precedent, he ordained Richard Whatcoat and Thomas Vasey as presbyters. Additionally, he consecrated Thomas Coke as a general superintendent for the ministry in the United States.

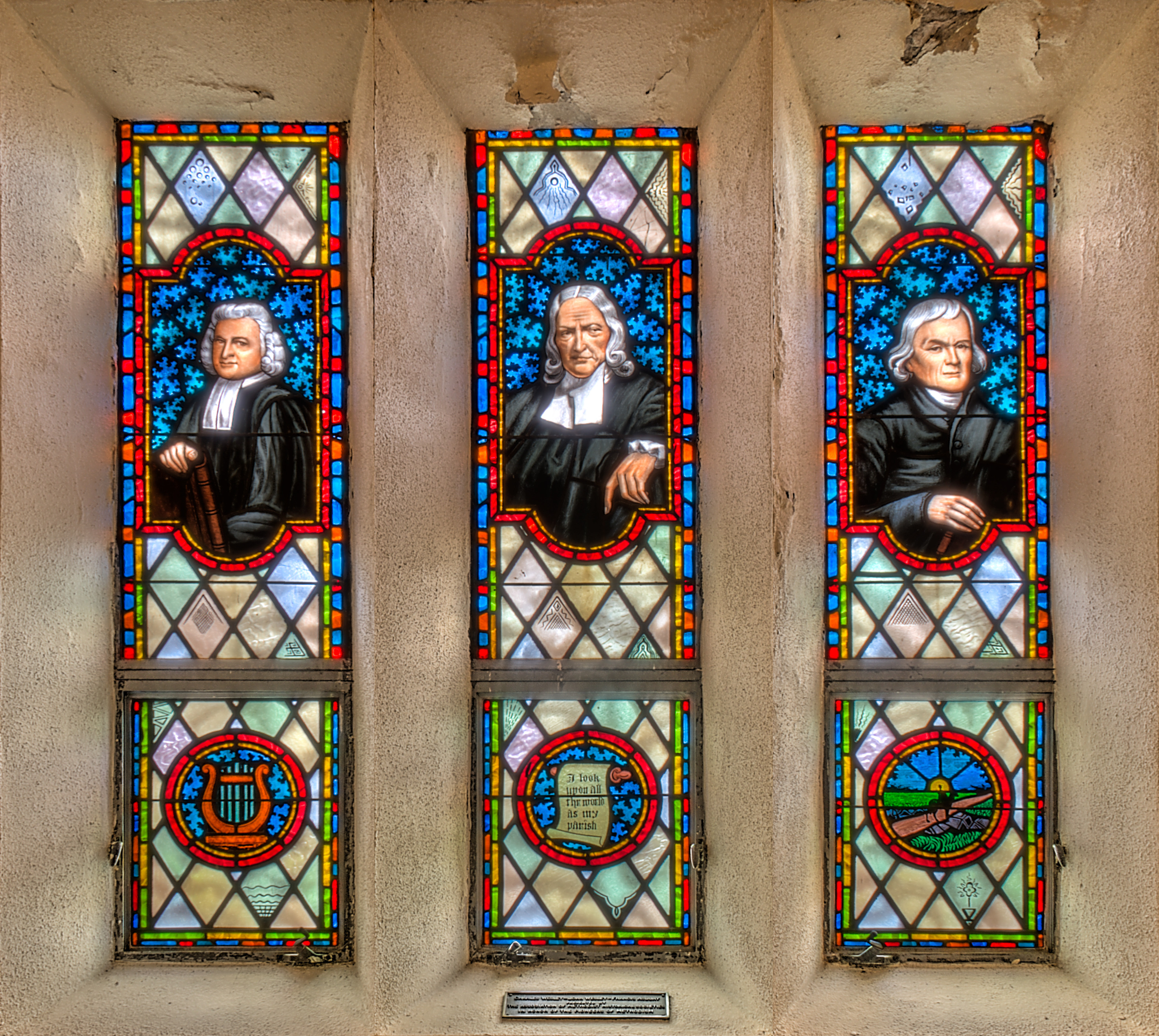
Stained glass of three Methodist ministers, Charles Wesley, John Wesley, and Francis Asbury, at Lake Junaluska

Due to this trajectory, Methodist episcopacy is understood as a consecrated office of general superintendency. It is not viewed as a third order of ministry separate from the presbyterate. Therefore, Methodists recognize other forms of ordination and ecclesiastical structures alongside their own system. Methodism locates apostolic succession primarily in the continuity of apostolic doctrine, mission, and spiritual life, rather than relying on a tactile succession of bishops.

Furthermore, Methodism has placed an emphasis on evangelism. To facilitate this mission, Wesley authorized laymen to serve as local preachers, allowing the movement to expand beyond the limitations of the ordained clergy. This commitment was outworked through door-to-door preaching and open-air preaching campaigns. The movement also relied on the production and distribution of religious literature and Gospel tracts to reach the masses. To ensure that this evangelism resulted in continuous spiritual growth, converts were integrated into a structure of classes and bands, providing pastoral care and accountability.

=== Sacraments and means of grace ===
==== Baptism ====
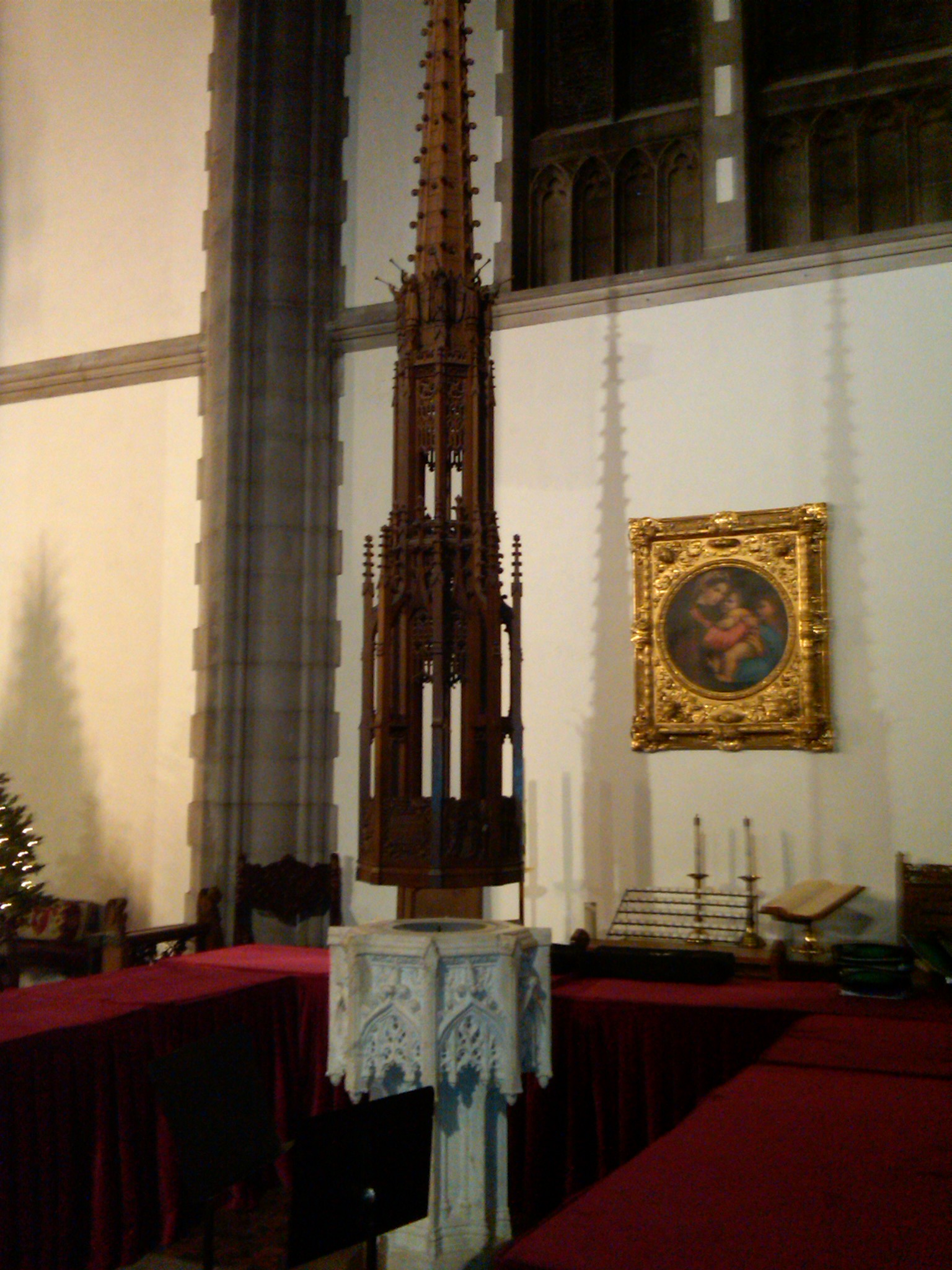
A baptistry in a Methodist church

Methodist theology recognizes two primary, dominical sacraments of the Gospel: Baptism and the Lord's Supper. Baptism formally serves as the sacrament of initiation into the visible Church. Theologically, it operates as a sign of inward regeneration and a seal of the covenant of grace. In Wesleyan covenant theology, baptism corresponds to the Old Testament rite of circumcision, confirming God's promises to the believer. Methodists practice both infant baptism and believer's baptism as valid expressions of faith. They recognize three modes of baptism, immersion, pouring (affusion), and sprinkling (aspersion), as valid when administered in the Trinitarian formula. However, the regenerating grace signified in baptism requires subsequent repentance and faith for salvation.

==== Real presence in the Lord's Supper ====
Wesleyan theology affirms the real spiritual presence of Jesus Christ in the Eucharist. Followers of the tradition have affirmed that the sacrament of the Lord's Supper is an instrumental means of grace through which the real presence of Christ is communicated to the believer. Methodism inherited the Reformed view of the Lord's Supper through the Twenty-five Articles. Article XVIII posits a spiritual presence of Christ in the Eucharist, noting that the body of Christ is given, taken, and eaten only after a heavenly and spiritual manner. Methodists assert that Jesus is spiritually present, and that the means of his presence is a holy mystery. The agent of this communication is the Holy Spirit.

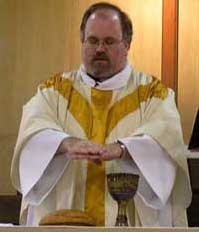
A United Methodist minister celebrating the Holy Eucharist.

In particular, Methodists reject the Catholic doctrine of transubstantiation, as outlined in the Articles of Religion. Similarly, denominations such as the Primitive Methodist Church discard theories of physical, localized presence such as the Lollardist doctrine of consubstantiation. Instead, Wesleyan traditions prefer to leave the metaphysical mode of Christ's presence undefined. The Church of the Nazarene reflects this perspective by declaring that the sacrament is a means of grace where Christ is present by the Spirit.

Historically, the Lord's Supper is regarded as a converting and sanctifying ordinance. In liturgical practice, it operates as a dynamic anamnesis. The United Methodist Church affirms this, recognizing anamnesis as a re-presentation of past gracious acts of God. This theology is illustrated in the language of the United Methodist Communion Liturgy, where the epiclesis of the Great Thanksgiving involves the minister praying over the elements for the Holy Spirit to transform them for the congregation. The congregation also participates in this mystery through song, such as Charles Wesley's hymn Come Sinners to the Gospel Feast inviting sinners to the gospel feast to partake of the flesh and blood of Christ. The belief is that believers partake of Christ's body and blood in a spiritual manner. The feature of the Methodist doctrine is that the manifestation remains a mystery, maintaining the focus that Christ is truly present.

==== Confession, lovefeasts, and feetwashing ====
Methodist theology teaches that the Christian life should be characterized by holy living, free from sin. However, for individuals who fall into sin or backslide, Wesleyan doctrine holds that these persons should confess the problem and restore their relationship with God. Methodists practice confession of their sin to God through prayer.

The private confession of sins to a pastor is defined by the Articles of Religion as a practice not to be counted for sacraments of the Gospel, also known as the five lesser sacraments. John Wesley assumed the validity of Anglican practice in his day as reflected in the 1662 Book of Common Prayer. He stated that confession to a spiritual guide is of use for disburdening the conscience and as a help to repentance. Additionally, per the recommendation of Wesley, Methodist class meetings, as well as penitent bands, met weekly in order to confess sins to one another.

Lovefeasts (in which bread and the loving-cup are shared between members of the congregation) are a means of grace and a converting ordinance that John Wesley believed to be an apostolic institution. An account from July 1776 expounded on the fact that people experienced entire sanctification at a Lovefeast.

In certain Methodist connexions, such as the Missionary Methodist Church and the New Congregational Methodist Church, feetwashing is practiced at the time that the Lord's Supper is celebrated. The Missionary Methodist Church states this in its Book of Discipline. In congregations of the Global Methodist Church and United Methodist Church that are descended from the Evangelical United Brethren Church, feetwashing is practiced when the Lord's Supper is celebrated. In other connexions such as the Free Methodist Church, feetwashing is practiced on Maundy Thursday.

== Christian life and ethical practice ==
=== Prayer ===
Methodism utilizes extemporaneous prayer alongside liturgical forms. Many Methodist churches devote a portion of their Sunday evening service and mid-week Wednesday evening prayer meeting to having congregants share their prayer requests, in addition to hearing personal testimonies about their faith and experiences in living the Christian life. After listening to various members of the congregation share their salvation testimonies, voice their prayer requests and offer praise reports, congregants often kneel for intercessory prayer.

Early Methodism was known for its observance of canonical hours of prayer. It inherited from its Anglican patrimony the rubrics of reciting the Daily Office, which Methodist Christians were expected to pray. The first prayer book of Methodism, The Sunday Service of the Methodists with other occasional Services thus included the canonical hours of both Morning Prayer and Evening Prayer; these services were observed everyday in early Christianity, though on the Lord's Day, worship included the Eucharist. Later Methodist liturgical books, such as The Methodist Worship Book (1999) provide for Morning Prayer and Evening Prayer to be prayed daily; the United Methodist Church encourages its communicants to pray the canonical hours as an essential practice of being a disciple of Jesus. Some Methodist religious orders publish the Daily Office to be used for that community, for example, The Book of Offices and Services of The Order of Saint Luke contains the canonical hours to be prayed traditionally at seven fixed prayer times: Lauds (6 am), Terce (9 am), Sext (12 pm), None (3 pm), Vespers (6 pm), Compline (9 pm) and Vigil (12 am). Some Methodist congregations offer daily Morning Prayer.

=== Outward holiness ===
Early Methodists wore plain dress, with Methodist clergy condemning costly clothing. John Wesley recommended that Methodists annually read his thoughts On Dress. In that sermon, John Wesley expressed his desire for Methodists to maintain this lifestyle. The 1858 Discipline of the Wesleyan Methodist Connection thus stated that they would enjoin plain dress. Peter Cartwright, a Methodist revivalist, stated that in addition to wearing plain dress, the early Methodists distinguished themselves from other members of society by fasting on Fridays, abstaining from alcohol, and devoutly observing the Sabbath. Methodist circuit riders were known for practicing the spiritual discipline of mortifying the flesh. The early Methodists did not participate in, and condemned, worldly habits.

Over time, many of these practices were relaxed in mainline Methodism, although practices such as teetotalism and fasting are encouraged, in addition to the prohibition of gambling. Denominations of the conservative holiness movement, such as the Allegheny Wesleyan Methodist Connection and Evangelical Wesleyan Church, continue to reflect the spirit of the historic Methodist practice of wearing plain dress. The Fellowship of Independent Methodist Churches, which continues to observe the ordinance of women's headcovering, stipulates renouncing vain pomp and glory and adorning oneself with modest attire. The General Rules of the Methodist Church in America, which are among the doctrinal standards of many Methodist churches, promote first-day Sabbatarianism as they require attending upon all the ordinances of God including the public worship of God and prohibit profaning the day of the Lord.

=== Teetotalism ===
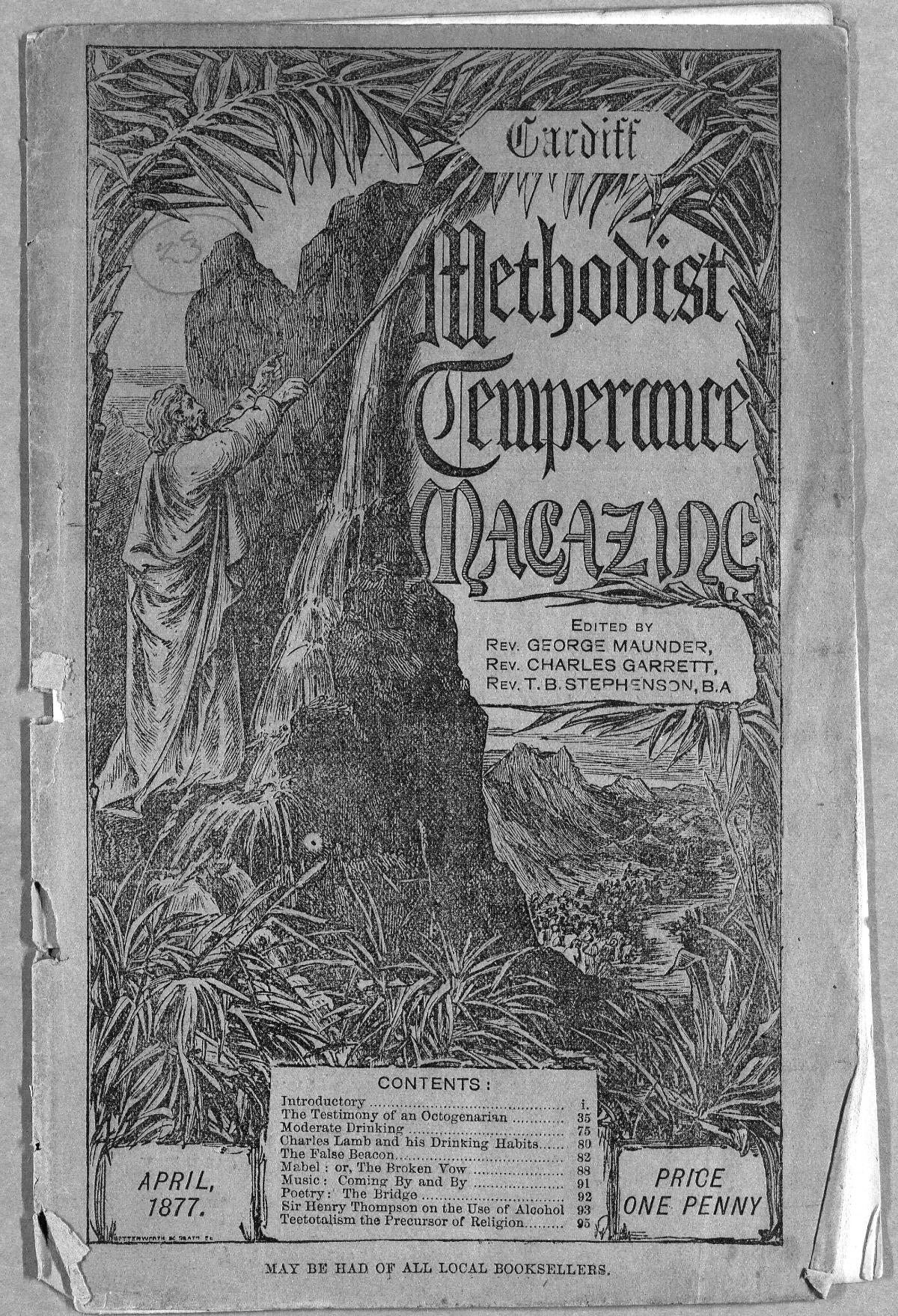
Methodist Temperance Magazine, a Wesleyan Methodist publication in Cardiff, Wales

John Wesley laid foundations for Methodism's call to abstain from beverage alcohol and its warnings about the use of drugs. He referred to liquors as poison and condemned those who sold it of leading people to hell. Methodist churches are aligned with the temperance movement and its call for teetotalism. In Great Britain, both Wesleyan Methodists and Primitive Methodists championed the cause of temperance. The Methodist Board of Temperance, Prohibition, and Public Morals was later established in the United States to further the movement.

The 2014 Discipline of the Allegheny Wesleyan Methodist Connection summarizes the practice of Methodists regarding their requirement of abstinence from alcohol and other drugs.

=== Fasting ===
Fasting is considered one of the works of piety. Methodism's principal liturgical book The Sunday Service of the Methodists, as well as The Directions Given to Band Societies by John Wesley, mandate fasting and abstinence from meat on all Fridays of the year in remembrance of the crucifixion of Jesus. Wesley himself also kept the Eucharistic fast, fasting before receiving Holy Communion, and asked other Methodist Christians to do the same.

=== Law and Gospel ===
John Wesley admonished Methodist preachers to emphasize both the Law and the Gospel. Methodism makes a distinction between the ceremonial law and the moral law that is the Ten Commandments given to Moses. In Methodist Christianity, the moral law is grounded in eternity. In contradistinction to the teaching of the Lutheran churches, the Methodist churches bring the Law and the Gospel together. John Wesley, the father of the Methodist tradition taught that there is no contrariety at all between the law and the gospel.

=== Sunday Sabbatarianism ===
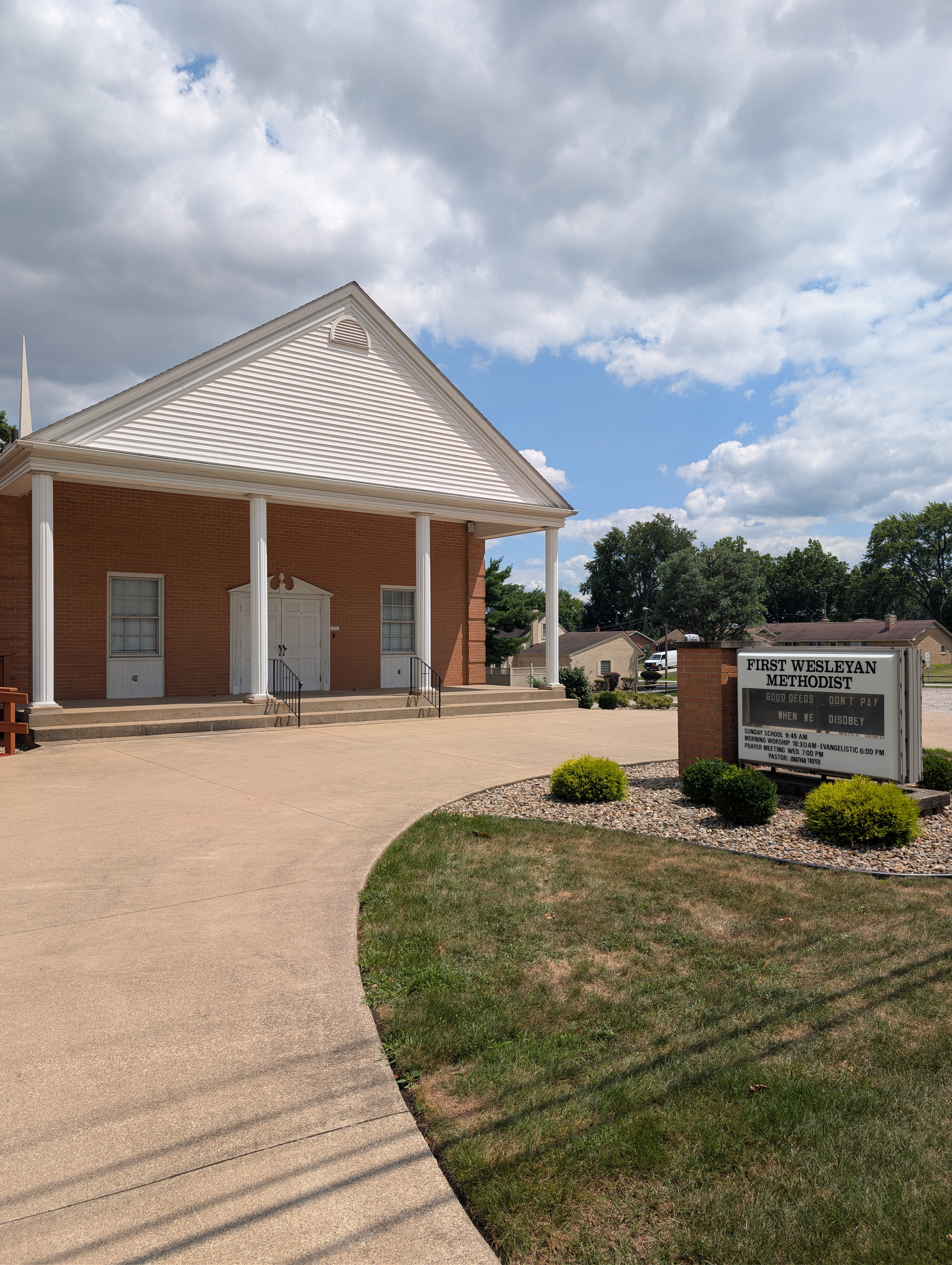
The sign of this Wesleyan Methodist church displays the times for the Sunday morning service of worship and Sunday evening service of worship, consistent with historical First-day Sabbatarian doctrine.

The early Methodists were known for keeping the Sabbath day. They regarded keeping the Lord's Day as a duty. The General Rules of the Methodist Church require attending upon all the ordinances of God and prohibit profaning the day of the Lord. The Sunday Sabbatarian practices of the earlier Wesleyan Methodist Church in Great Britain are described by Jonathan Crowther in A Portraiture of Methodism. Methodist churches have historically observed the Lord's Day devoutly with a morning service of worship, along with an evening service of worship.

== Eschatology and final destiny ==
=== Eschatology ===
John Wesley described his eschatological views on the Book of Revelation in his Explanatory Notes Upon the New Testament (1755). He struggled with how to interpret the middle of the book which describes heavenly and earthy conflict in very symbolic language. He relied heavily on the works of German theologian Johann Albrecht Bengel (1687-1752) for a mathematical interpretation of the numbers in the book to find a correspondence between church history and the events described in Revelation. For example, by Wesley's calculations, using Bengel's mathematical key, the story of the woman in the wilderness in Revelation 12 was the story of the Christian church in two overlapping periods of church history (847-1524 CE and 1058-1836 CE). Wesley's primary concern, however, was not so much with prophecy or chronology, but rather with how to use Revelation to help believers have strength in times of trial.

=== Four Last Things ===
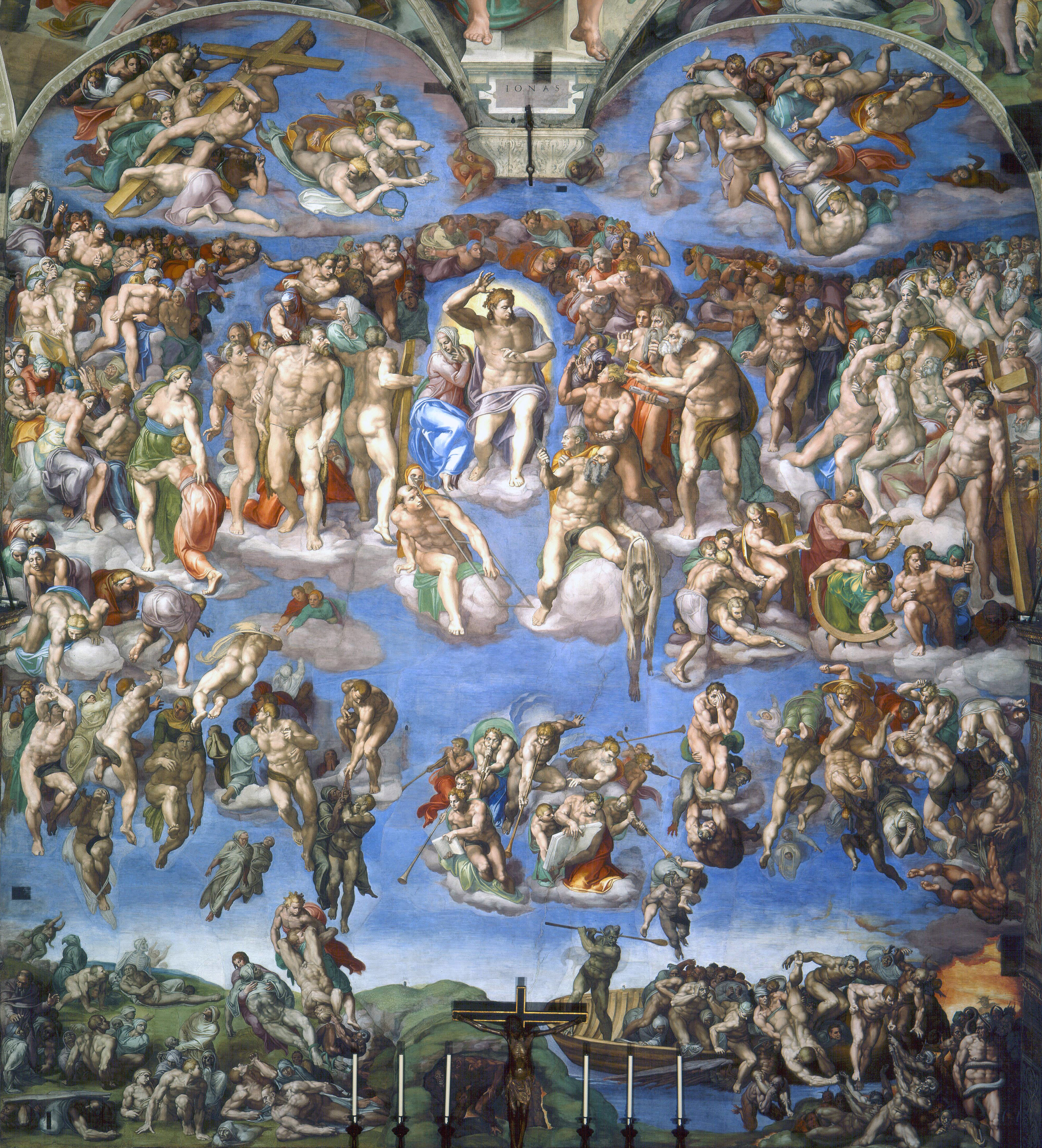
The Last Judgment determines the final destiny of souls.

With respect to the four last things, Wesleyan theology affirms the belief in Hades, the intermediate state of souls between death and the general resurrection, which is divided into Paradise for the righteous and Gehenna for the wicked. After the general judgment, Hades will be abolished. John Wesley made a distinction between hell as the receptacle of the damned and Hades as the receptacle of all separate spirits, and also between paradise as the antechamber of heaven and heaven itself. The dead will remain in Hades until the Day of Judgment when all will be bodily resurrected and stand before Christ as judge. After the Judgment, the Righteous will go to their eternal reward in Heaven and the Damned will depart to Hell. The Evangelical Methodist Church Discipline states that everyone that has a saving knowledge of Jesus Christ our Lord on departing from this life, goes to be in felicity with Him, and will share the eternal glories of His everlasting Kingdom; the fuller rewards and the greater glories, being reserved until the final Judgment. It also notes that while the saint goes from the judgment to enjoy eternal bliss, the impenitent sinner is turned away into everlasting condemnation, punishment and misery. Wesley stated that he believed it to be a duty to observe, to pray for the Faithful Departed. He taught the propriety of Praying for the Dead, practised it himself, provided Forms that others might. In a joint statement with the Catholic Church in England and Wales, the Methodist Church of Great Britain affirmed that Methodists who pray for the dead thereby commend them to the continuing mercy of God.

== Churches upholding Wesleyan theology ==
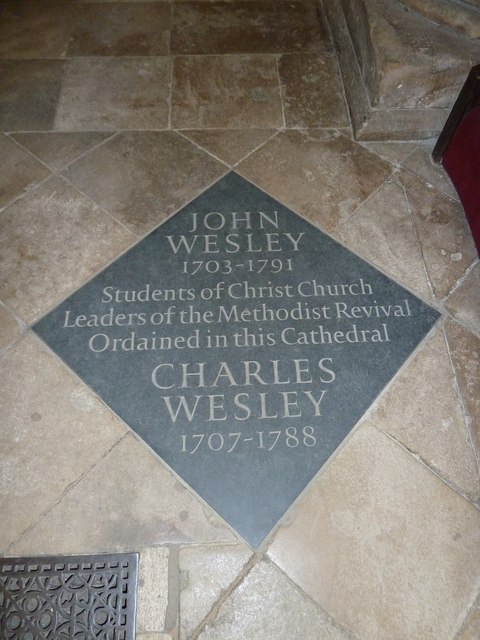
Memorial to John Wesley and Charles Wesley in Christ Church Cathedral, Oxford

Methodism began as a reform movement within the Church of England, and, for a while, it remained as such. The movement separated itself from its mother church and became known as the Methodist Episcopal Church in America and the Wesleyan Methodist Church in Britain (as distinguished from Calvinistic Methodism). Many divisions occurred within the Methodist Episcopal Church in the 19th century, mostly over attitudes towards slavery, though doctrinally, opposition to slavery is one of the works of mercy. Some of these schisms healed in the early 20th century, and many of the splinter Methodist groups came together by 1939 to form the Methodist Church. In 1968, the Methodist Church joined with the Radical Pietist Evangelical United Brethren Church to form The United Methodist Church, the largest Methodist church in America. Other groups include the African Methodist Episcopal Church, the African Methodist Episcopal Zion Church, Christian Methodist Episcopal Church, the Congregational Methodist Church, the Evangelical Methodist Church, the Free Methodist Church, the Global Methodist Church, the Holiness Methodist Church, the Methodist Protestant Church, the Primitive Methodist Church, and the Southern Methodist Church. There are also various Independent Methodist associations, such as the Fellowship of Independent Methodist Churches.

In 19th-century America, a dissension arose over the nature of entire sanctification. Those who believed that entire sanctification could occur both instantaneously or could result from progressive sanctification culminating in Christian perfection, remained within the mainline Methodist churches; others, however, emphasized the instantaneous nature of entire sanctification. The latter line of thought came to be known as the holiness movement and while many of those who supported it remained in mainline Methodism, such as at Asbury Theological Seminary. Others began the various holiness churches. Including the Free Methodist Church, Church of God (Holiness), the Church of God (Anderson), the Churches of Christ in Christian Union, and the Wesleyan Methodist Church, which later merged with the Pilgrim Holiness Church to form the Wesleyan Church, which is present today. Other holiness groups, which also rejected the competing Pentecostal movement, merged to form the Church of the Nazarene. The Salvation Army is another Wesleyan-Holiness group which traces its roots to early Methodism. The Salvation Army's founders Catherine and William Booth founded the organization to stress evangelism and social action when William was a minister in the Methodist Reform Church.

The conservative holiness movement, including denominations such as the Allegheny Wesleyan Methodist Connection, Bible Methodist Connection of Churches, Evangelical Methodist Church Conference, Evangelical Wesleyan Church and Fellowship of Independent Methodist Churches, emerged in the 19th and 20th centuries to herald many of the strict standards of primitive Methodism, including outward holiness, plain dress, and temperance. A modified form of Wesleyan theology became the basis for other distinct denominations as well, for example the Holiness Pentecostal movement launched by William J. Seymour and Charles Parham, represented by denominations such as the Apostolic Faith Church and International Pentecostal Holiness Church. These traditions incorporate the Wesleyan doctrine of a second work of grace prior to their belief in the baptism with the Holy Spirit.

== Relationship with other religions ==
Wesley assumed the superiority of Christianity vis-à-vis to Islam, based on his commitment to the biblical revelation as "the book of God". His theological interpretation of Christianity was seeking its imperative rather than considering other Abrahamic and Eastern religions to be equal. He regarded the righteous lifestyles of Muslims as an "ox goad" to prick the collective Christian conscience. Although his Letter to a Roman Catholic (1749), a conciliatory appeal for understanding and shared Christian faith, is sometimes seen as an act of religious tolerance, Wesley remained rooted in the anti-Catholicism characteristic of 18th-century England.

== See also ==
- Christian perfection
- Saints in Methodism

== Notes and references ==
=== Sources ===
- Abraham, William J. (2009). The Oxford Handbook of Methodist Studies. Oxford: Oxford University Press. ISBN 9780191607431.
- Abraham, William J. (25 August 2016). "The Birth Pangs of United Methodism as a Unique, Global, Orthodox Denomination".
- Adams, Michelle Medlock (7 January 2015). "God Don't Make No Junk!". Guideposts.
- Alexander, Donald L. (1988). Christian Spirituality: Five Views of Sanctification. Downers Grove, IL: InterVarsity Press. ISBN 978-0-8308-1278-3.
- Anderson, David (1985). Conditional Security. Nicholasville, KY: Schmul Publishing Co.
- AWMC (2014). The Discipline of the Allegheny Wesleyan Methodist Connection (Original Allegheny Conference). Salem, OH: Allegheny Wesleyan Methodist Connection.
- Banks, Stanley (2024). "Christian Perfection". The Asbury Journal. 79 (1): 30–45.
- Beard, Steve (30 January 2012). "The Spiritual Discipline of Fasting". Good News Magazine.
- Beckwith, Roger T. (2005). Calendar, Chronology And Worship: Studies in Ancient Judaism And Early Christianity. Leiden: Brill Academic Publishers. ISBN 978-90-04-14603-7.
- Bercot, David W. (2021). Dictionary of Early Christian Beliefs. Carol Stream, IL: Tyndale House Publishers. ISBN 978-1-61970-168-7.
- Black, Brian (2023). Properly Defining Sin. Middleburg, PA: Heritage Publications.
- Bloom, Linda (20 July 2007). "Vatican Stance "Nothing New" Say Church Leader". The United Methodist Church. Archived from the original on 2019-05-31.
- Blunt, John Henry (1891). Dictionary of Doctrinal and Historical Theology. London: Longmans, Green & Co.
- Bounds, Christopher T. (2011). "How are People Saved? The Major Views of Salvation with a Focus on Wesleyan Perspectives and their Implications". Wesley and Methodist Studies. 3: 31–54.
- Bratt, James D. (2012). By the Vision of Another World: Worship in American History. Grand Rapids, MI: Wm. B. Eerdmans Publishing. ISBN 9780802867100.
- Brown, Allan P. (1 June 2008). "Questions About Entire Sanctification". God's Bible School & College. Archived from the original on 2019-03-27.
- Bucher, Richard P. (2014). "Methodism". Lexington, KY: Lutheran Church Missouri Synod. Archived from the original on 2014-07-25.
- Burns, Stephen (2019). Liturgy with a Difference: Beyond Inclusion in the Christian Assembly. London: SCM Press. ISBN 978-0-334-05742-0.
- Campbell, Ted A. (2011). Methodist Doctrine: The Essentials. Nashville, TN: Abingdon Press. ISBN 9781426753473.
- Carroll, R. E. (2016). "The Witness of the Spirit". The Convention Herald. 69 (2): 10–12.
- Cartwright, Peter (1857). Autobiography of Peter Cartwright: The Backwoods Preacher. New York: Carlton & Porter.
- Caughey, James (1850). Methodism in Earnest. Boston: Charles H. Peirce.
- Collins, Kenneth J. (2025). "Worship and the Sacraments (Part 2)". Biblical Training.
- Cooke, Richard Joseph (1896). The Historic Episcopate: A Study of Anglican Claims and Methodist Orders. New York: Eaton & Mains.
- Cracknell, Kenneth; White, Susan J. (2005). An introduction to world Methodism. New York: Cambridge University Press.
- Crowther, Jonathan (1815). A Portraiture of Methodism: Or, The History of the Wesleyan Methodists. London: T. Blanshard.
- Curnock, Nehemiah (1938). Journals of Wesley. London: Epworth Press.
- Curtis, Harold (2006). Following the Cloud: A Vision of the Convergence of Science and the Church. Charleston, SC: Harold Curtis. ISBN 978-1-4196-4571-6.
- Danker, Ryan N. (15 February 2024). "A Wesleyan Account of Sanctifying Grace". Seedbed.
- Davies, Rupert E. (2017). A History of the Methodist Church in Great Britain. Vol. 3. Eugene, OR: Wipf & Stock Publishers. ISBN 9781532630507.
- Dayton, Donald W. (1991). "Law and Gospel in the Wesleyan Tradition". Grace Theological Journal. 12 (2): 233–243.
- Dayton, Donald W. (2021). "The Holiness and Pentecostal Churches: Emerging from Cultural Isolation". Religion Online.
- Dragos, Andrew (8 May 2012). "How Prevenient Grace Shapes Our Missional Presence". Seedbed.
- Elwell, Walter A. (2001). Evangelical Dictionary of Theology. Grand Rapids, MI: Baker Publishing Group. ISBN 9781441200303.
- EMCC (2017). Evangelical Methodist Church Discipline. Indianapolis, IN: Evangelical Methodist Church Conference.
- Emmanuel Association (2002). Guidebook of the Emmanuel Association of Churches. Logansport, IN: Emmanuel Association.
- Episcopius, Simon; Ellis, Mark A. (2005). "Introduction" (PDF). The Arminian confession of 1621. Eugene, Oregon: Pickwick Publications.
- EWC (2015). The Discipline of the Evangelical Wesleyan Church. Cooperstown, PA: Evangelical Wesleyan Church.
- Fahlbusch, Erwin (2008). The Encyclopedia of Christianity. Vol. 3. Grand Rapids, MI: Wm. B. Eerdmans Publishing. ISBN 9780802824172.
- FIMC (26 January 2022). "Brief Description". Fellowship of Independent Methodist Churches. Archived from the original on 2022-01-26.
- FMC (6 October 2019). "Wesleyan Quadrilateral: Tradition". Free Methodist Church of Santa Barbara.
- Forlines, F. Leroy (2011). Classical Arminianism: A Theology of Salvation. Nashville, TN: Randall House. ISBN 978-0-89265-607-3.
- Fowler, Robert Booth (2018). Religion and Politics in America: Faith, Culture, and Strategic Choices. New York: Taylor & Francis. ISBN 9780429972799.
- Gorrie, P. Douglass (1852). Episcopal Methodism, as It Was, and Is. Auburn, NY: Miller, Orton & Mulligan.
- Gould, James B. (2016). Understanding Prayer for the Dead: Its Foundation in History and Logic. Eugene, OR: Wipf and Stock Publishers. ISBN 9781620329887.
- Grider, J. Kenneth (1982). "The Nature of Wesleyan Theology". Wesleyan Theological Journal. 17 (2): 43–57.
- Gunter, William Stephen (2007). "John Wesley, a Faithful Representative of Jacobus Arminius" (PDF). Wesleyan Theological Journal. 42 (2): 65–82.
- Harvester Church of the Nazarene (2025). "What We Believe". Harvester Church of the Nazarene.
- Hastings, James (1928). Encyclopaedia of Religion and Ethics. Vol. 9. New York: Scribner.
- Heron, Alasdair I. C. (1999). "Arminianism". Encyclopedia of Christianity. Vol. 1. Grand Rapids, Michigan: Wm. B. Eerdmans. pp. 128–129.
- Hicks, Tom (13 May 2013). "Classical Arminianism: Imputed Sin and Total Inability". Founders Ministries.
- Hinson, E. Glenn (1995). The Church Triumphant: A History of Christianity Up to 1300. Macon, GA: Mercer University Press. ISBN 9780865544369.
- Hixon, Daniel McLain (5 September 2010). "Methodists and Apostolic Succession". Gloria Deo.
- Holden, Harrington William (1872). John Wesley in Company with High Churchmen. London: J. Hodges.
- Hurst, John Fletcher (1902). The History of Methodism. Vol. 2. New York: Eaton & Mains.
- Immanuel Missionary Church (1986). Discipline of the Immanuel Missionary Church. Shoals, IN: Immanuel Missionary Church.
- Jay, Eric G. (1980). The Church: Its Changing Image Through Twenty Centuries. Atlanta, GA: John Knox Press. ISBN 9780804209212.
- Jones, Scott J. (2002). United Methodist Doctrine: The Extreme Center. Nashville, TN: Abingdon Press. ISBN 9780687034857.
- Jones, Susan H. (2019). Everyday Public Worship. London: SCM Press. ISBN 978-0-334-05757-4.
- Joyner, F. Belton (2007a). United Methodist Questions, United Methodist Answers: Exploring Christian Faith. Louisville, KY: Westminster John Knox Press. ISBN 9780664230395.
- Joyner, F. Belton (2007b). United Methodist Answers. Louisville, KY: Westminster John Knox Press. ISBN 9780664230395.
- Knight, Henry H. III (2010). From Aldersgate to Azusa Street: Wesleyan, Holiness, and Pentecostal Visions of the New Creation. Eugene, OR: Cascade Books. ISBN 978-1630876562.
- Knight, Henry H. III (9 July 2013). "Wesley on Faith and Good Works". AFTE.
- Langford, Andy (2011). Living as United Methodist Christians: Our Story, Our Beliefs, Our Lives. Nashville, TN: Abingdon Press. ISBN 9781426711930.
- Lawrence, William B. (15 May 2021). "Slavery and the Founders of Methodism". United Methodist News Service.
- Long, D. Stephen (2012). Keeping Faith: An Ecumenical Commentary on the Articles of Religion and Confession of Faith in the Wesleyan Tradition. Eugene, OR: Wipf and Stock Publishers. ISBN 978-1-62189-416-2.
- Lyerly, Cynthia Lynn (1998). Methodism and the Southern Mind, 1770-1810. New York: Oxford University Press. ISBN 9780195354249.
- Mahoney, James (9 July 2024). "The Methodist's Duty: Wesley's "Constant Communion" and the 21st Century Methodist". Firebrand Magazine.
- Mallalieu, Willard Francis (1903). The Fullness of the Blessing of the Gospel of Christ. Cincinnati, OH: Jennings and Pye.
- McClintock, John (1894). Cyclopaedia of Biblical, Theological, and Ecclesiastical Literature. Vol. 6. New York: Harper & Brothers.
- McClintock, John (2024). "Methodists, Free". McClintock and Strong Biblical Cyclopedia Online.
- McKnight, Scot (2010). Fasting: The Ancient Practices. Nashville, TN: Thomas Nelson. ISBN 9781418576134.
- McLeod, Alexander W. (1899). The Methodist Ministry Defended. Halifax: General Books LLC.
- Mellor, G. Howard (2003). "The Wesleyan Quadrilateral". Methodist Evangelicals Together.
- Melton, J. Gordon (1987). The Encyclopedia of American Religions. Detroit, MI: Gale Research Company. ISBN 978-0-8103-2133-5.
- Melton, J. Gordon (2005). Encyclopedia of Protestantism. New York: Infobase Publishing. ISBN 9780816069835.
- Methodist Church of Great Britain (2023). "The Methodist Quadrilateral". Methodist Church of Great Britain.
- Methodist Episcopal Church (1888). Minutes of the New York East Conference. New York: New York East Conference of the Methodist Episcopal Church.
- Methodist Heritage (2016). "John Wesley's Conversion Place Memorial – The 'Aldersgate Flame'". Methodist Heritage.
- MMC (2004). Discipline of the Missionary Methodist Church. Forest City, NC: Missionary Methodist Church.
- Neal, Gregory S. (2010). "United Methodist Communion Liturgy: Word and Table 1". revneal.org. Archived from the original on 2009-04-17.
- Neal, Gregory S. (2014). Grace Upon Grace. Bloomington, IN: WestBow Press. ISBN 9781490860060.
- Nettles, Thomas J. (2009). Understanding Four Views on Baptism. Grand Rapids, MI: Zondervan. ISBN 9780310866985.
- Newman, Rocky (2024). "What Holiness is Not". The Allegheny Wesleyan Methodist. 86 (7): 11–12.
- Newton, William F. (1863). The Magazine of the Wesleyan Methodist Church. London: J. Fry & Company.
- Nichols, Bridget (2012). The Collect in the Churches of the Reformation. London: SCM Press. ISBN 978-0-334-04207-5.
- Oden, Thomas C. (1988). Doctrinal Standards in the Wesleyan Tradition. Grand Rapids, MI: Francis Asbury Press. ISBN 978-0-310-75240-0.
- Oden, Thomas C. (2008). Doctrinal Standards in the Wesleyan Tradition: Revised Edition. Nashville, TN: Abingdon Press. ISBN 9780687651115.
- Olson, Mark K. (4 June 2022). "John Wesley on Sin and Holiness". Wesley Scholar.
- Olson, Roger E. (2005). The SCM Press A-Z of Evangelical Theology. London: SCM Press. ISBN 978-0-334-04011-8.
- Olson, Roger E. (2009). Arminian Theology: Myths and Realities. Downers Grove, Illinois: InterVarsity Press.
- Order of Saint Luke (2012). The Book of Offices and Services. Cleveland, TN: Order of Saint Luke.
- Order of Saint Patrick (21 April 2017). "Methodist Christianity". The Order of Saint Patrick.
- Picirilli, Robert E. (2002). Grace, Faith, Free Will: Contrasting Views of Salvation. Nashville, TN: Randall House Publications. ISBN 978-0-89265-648-6.
- Pillar of Fire Church (1948). Catechism of the Pillar of Fire Church. Zarephath, NJ: Pillar of Fire Church.
- Pinson, J. Matthew (2002). Four Views on Eternal Security. Grand Rapids, MI: HarperCollins. ISBN 9780310234395.
- Plantagenet Publishing. The Cambridge Medieval History Series. Vol. 1–5. Plantagenet Publishing.
- Primitive Methodist Church (2013). Discipline of the Primitive Methodist Church in the United States of America. Wilkes-Barre, PA: Primitive Methodist Church.
- Pruitt, Kenneth (22 November 2013). "Where The Line Is Drawn: Ordination and Sexual Orientation in the UMC". Rethink Bishop. Archived from the original on 2014-04-28.
- Richey, Russell E. (1993). Perspectives on American Methodism: Interpretive Essays. Nashville, TN: Kingswood Books. ISBN 9780687307821.
- Richie, T. (2003). "John Wesley and Mohammed" (PDF). CORE.
- Rodes, Stanley J. (2014). From Faith to Faith: John Wesley's Covenant Theology and the Way of Salvation. Cambridge: James Clarke & Co. ISBN 9780227902202.
- Rothwell, Mel-Thomas (1998). A Catechism on the Christian Religion: The Doctrines of Christianity with Special Emphasis on Wesleyan Concepts. Nicholasville, KY: Schmul Publishing Co. ISBN 0880193867.
- Ruth, C. W. (29 June 2017). "Consecration: The Human Side of Sanctification". God's Bible School and College. Archived from the original on 2021-05-19.
- Sanders, Fred (2013). Wesley on the Christian Life: The Heart Renewed in Love. Wheaton, IL: Crossway. ISBN 978-1-4335-2487-5.
- Sawyer, M. James (2016). The Survivor's Guide to Theology. Eugene, OR: Wipf and Stock Publishers. ISBN 9781498294058.
- Sayer, M. James (2006). The Survivor's Guide to Theology. Grand Rapids, MI: Zondervan. ISBN 9780310257851.
- Schaff, Philip (1878). The Creeds of Christendom. Vol. 1. New York: Harper & Brothers.
- Schaff, Philip (1893). The Theological Propaedeutic: A General Introduction to the Study of Theology. New York: Charles Scribner's Sons.
- Seedbed (25 August 2016). "Wesley on Preaching Law and Gospel". Seedbed.
- Sidwell, Mark (2021). "Conservative Holiness Movement: A Fundamentalism File Report". Fundamentalism File.
- Smedley, R. C. (2005). History of the Underground Railroad: In Chester and the Neighboring Counties of Pennsylvania. Mechanicsburg, PA: Stackpole Books. ISBN 978-0-8117-3189-8.
- Smithson, William T. (1859). The Methodist Pulpit. Washington, DC: H. Polkinhorn.
- Southey, Robert (1820). The Life of Wesley: And the Rise and Progress of Methodism. New York: Evert Duyckinck and George Long.
- St. Paul's Free Methodist Church (2024). "Philosophy of St. Paul's". St. Paul's Free Methodist Church.
- Stanglin, Keith D. (2012). Jacob Arminius: Theologian of Grace. New York: Oxford University Press. ISBN 9780199755677.
- Stevens, Abel (1858). The History of the Religious Movement of the Eighteenth Century, Called Methodism. Vol. 1. London: Carlton & Porter.
- Stevens, Abel (1885). A Compendious History of American Methodism. New York: Scholarly Publishing Office.
- Stokes, Mack B. (1998). Major United Methodist Beliefs. Nashville, TN: Abingdon Press. ISBN 9780687082124.
- Stuart, George Rutledge (1922). What Every Methodist Should Know. Nashville, TN: Lamar & Barton.
- Summers, Thomas Osmond (1857). Methodist Pamphlets for the People. Nashville, TN: E. Stevenson & F. A. Owen.
- Swartz, Alan (20 April 2009). "United Methodists and the Last Days". Hermeneutic. Archived from the original on 2012-04-11.
- Synan, Vinson (1997). The Holiness-Pentecostal Tradition: Charismatic Movements in the Twentieth Century. Grand Rapids, MI: Wm. B. Eerdmans Publishing. ISBN 978-0-8028-4103-2.
- Tennent, Timothy (9 July 2011). "Means of Grace: Why I am a Methodist and an Evangelical". Asbury Theological Seminary.
- The Methodist Visitor (1876). The Methodist Visitor. London: Elliot Stock.
- The Methodist Who's Who (1915). The Methodist Who's Who, 1915. London: C.H. Kelly.
- Thorsen, Don (2005). The Wesleyan Quadrilateral: Scripture, Tradition, Reason, & Experience as a Model of Evangelical Theology. Lexington, KY: Emeth Press.
- Tillett, Wilbur Fisk (1907). A Statement of the Faith of World-wide Methodism. Nashville, TN: Publishing House of the M.E. Church, South.
- Tõniste, Külli (2021). "John Wesley on the Book of Revelation". The Asbury Journal. 17 (2): 227–245.
- Torpy, Arthur Alan (2009). The Prevenient Piety of Samuel Wesley, Sr. Lanham, MD: Scarecrow Press. ISBN 978-0-8108-7082-6.
- Tovey, Phillip (2016). The Theory and Practice of Extended Communion. London: Routledge. ISBN 9781317014201.
- Tucker, Karen B. Westerfield (2011). American Methodist Worship. New York: Oxford University Press. ISBN 9780199774159.
- UMC (1984). The Book of Discipline of the United Methodist Church. Nashville, TN: Abingdon Press.
- UMC (2004a). The Book of Discipline of the United Methodist Church. Nashville, TN: Abingdon Press. ISBN 0-687-02373-4.
- UMC (2004b). "This Holy Mystery: A United Methodist Understanding of Holy Communion" (PDF). General Conference of The United Methodist Church.
- UMC (2007a). "By Water and the Spirit: A United Methodist Understanding of Baptism". The United Methodist Church.
- UMC (2007b). "The Ministry of the Elder". General Board of Higher Education and Ministry. Archived from the original on 2013-05-28.
- UMC (2010). "Seven Days of Preparation - A Guide for Reading, Meditation and Prayer" (PDF). United Methodist Church.
- UMC GBOD (6 May 2007). "Praying the Hours of the Day: Recovering Daily Prayer". General Board of Discipleship.
- UMC GBOD (2012). "John Wesley and Spiritual Disciplines: The Works of Piety". General Board of Global Ministries. Archived from the original on 2014-11-10.
- Underwood, Ralph L. (1992). Pastoral Care and the Means of Grace. Minneapolis, MN: Fortress Press. ISBN 9781451416466.
- Wagner, Amy (20 January 2014). "Wesley on Faith, Love, and Salvation". AFTE.
- Walker, Walter James (1885). Chapters on the Early Registers of Halifax Parish Church. Halifax: Whitley & Booth. ISBN 9780665169434.
- Wee, Boon Hup (6 September 2013). "Must I Confess My Sins?". The Methodist Church in Singapore. Archived from the original on 2016-02-01.
- Wesley, John (1818). Explanatory Notes Upon the New Testament. New York: J. Soule and T. Mason.
- Wesley, John (1825). The Sunday Service of the Methodists. London: J. Kershaw.
- Wesley, John (1872a). The Works of John Wesley. Vol. 10. London: Wesleyan Methodist Book Room.
- Wesley, John (1872b). The Works of John Wesley. Vol. 12. London: Wesleyan Methodist Book Room.
- Wesley, John (1882). The Ghost of Wesley (Extracts from His Writings). London: W. Poole.
- Wesley, John (1999). "The Sermons of John Wesley". Wesley Center for Applied Theology.
- Wesleyan Church (2026). "Baptism of the Holy Spirit". Wesleyan Methodist Church.
- Wesleyan Methodist Connection (1858). The Discipline of the Wesleyan Methodist Connection, of America. Syracuse, NY: Wesleyan Methodist Connection of America.
- WHAC (2017). Declaration of Principles: Manual of the Wesleyan Holiness Association of Churches. Dayton, OH: Wesleyan Holiness Association of Churches.
- Whalen, William Joseph (2002). Separated Brethren: A Review of Protestant, Anglican, Eastern Orthodox & Other Religions in the United States. Huntington, IN: Our Sunday Visitor. ISBN 9781931709057.
- Wheeler, Henry (1882). Methodism and the Temperance Reformation. Cincinnati, OH: Walden and Stowe.
- Whidden, Woodrow W. (18 April 2005). "Adventist Theology: The Wesleyan Connection". Biblical Research Institute. Archived from the original on 2019-06-30.
- Whitaker, Sigur E. (2011). James Allison: A Biography of the Engine Manufacturer and Indianapolis 500 Cofounder. Jefferson, NC: McFarland. ISBN 9780786486397.
- White, Charles E. (2008). The Beauty of Holiness: Phoebe Palmer as Theologian, Revivalist, Feminist and Humanitarian. Eugene, OR: Wipf and Stock Publishers. ISBN 978-1-7252-2173-4.
- Williamson, Edward W. (2012). The Evangelical Methodist Church Catechism. Indianapolis, IN: Evangelical Methodist Church.
- Wilmore FMC (2024). "Prayer". Wilmore Free Methodist Church.
- Wilson, James Grant (1889). Appleton's Cyclopaedia of American Biography. Vol. 6. New York: D. Appleton & Company.
- Winn, Christian T. Collins (2007). From the Margins: A Celebration of the Theological Work of Donald W. Dayton. Eugene, OR: Wipf and Stock Publishers. ISBN 9781630878320.
- Withington, John Swann (1878). The United Methodist Free Churches' Magazine. London: Thomas Newton.
- Wood, Darren Cushman (2007). "John Wesley's Use of Atonement". The Asbury Journal. 62 (2): 55–70.
- World Council of Churches (2021). "Holiness Churches". World Council of Churches.
- Wynkoop, Mildred Bangs (1967). Foundations of Wesleyan-Arminian Theology. Kansas City, MO: Beacon Hill Press.
- Yates, Kelly Diehl (2023). The Limits of a Catholic Spirit: John Wesley, Methodism, and Catholicism. Cambridge: Lutterworth Press.
- Yrigoyen, Charles Jr. (2005). Historical Dictionary of Methodism. Lanham, MD: Scarecrow Press. ISBN 9780810865464.
- Yrigoyen, Charles Jr. (2010). John Wesley: Holiness of Heart and Life. Nashville, TN: Abingdon Press. ISBN 978-1-4267-2945-4.
