= Sanctification in Christianity =

Act or process of acquiring sanctity

In Christianity, sanctification (or in its verb form, sanctify) literally means "to set apart for special use or purpose", that is, to make holy or sacred (compare Latin: sanctus). Therefore, sanctification refers to the state or process of being set apart, i.e. "made holy", as a vessel, full of the Holy Spirit. The term can be used to refer to objects which are set apart for special purposes, but the most common use within Christian theology is in reference to the change brought about by God in a believer, begun at the point of salvation and continuing throughout the life of the believer. When used in this sense, sanctification is known as growth in grace. Many forms of Christianity believe that this process will only be completed in Heaven, but some (particularly conservative Quaker and Methodist traditions, inclusive of the Holiness movement) believe that entire sanctification is possible in this life. Several traditions refer to the goal and possibility of reaching Christian maturity.

== Teaching by Christian denomination ==
=== Roman Catholicism ===
The Catholic Church upholds the doctrine of sanctification, teaching that:

Sanctifying grace is that grace which confers on our souls a new life, that is, sharing in the life of God. Our reconciliation with God, which the redemption of Christ has merited for us, finds its accomplishments in sanctifying grace. Through this most precious gift we participate in the divine life; we have the right to be called children of God. This grace is the source of all our supernatural merits and bestows upon us the right of eternal glory.

Saint Paul of the Cross stated that "Prayer, good reading, the frequent reception of the sacraments, with the proper dispositions, and particularly the flight of idleness—these are, believe me, the means of sanctifying yourself."

According to the Catholic Encyclopedia, "sanctity" differs for God, individual, and corporate body. For God, it is God's unique absolute moral perfection. For the individual, it is a close union with God and the resulting moral perfection. It is essentially of God, by a divine gift. For a society, it is the ability to produce and secure holiness in its members, who display a real, not merely nominal, holiness. The Church's holiness is beyond human power, beyond natural power.

The Second Vatican Council referred to Christian maturity as the true goal of liturgy and fraternal life:

Ceremonies however beautiful, or associations however flourishing, will be of little value if they are not directed toward the education of men to Christian maturity.

=== Eastern Orthodoxy ===
Orthodox Christianity teaches the doctrine of theosis, whereby humans take on divine properties, and in a particular sense, participate in the being of God. A key scripture supporting this is 2 Peter 1:4. In the 4th century, Athanasius of Alexandria taught that God became Man that man might become God. Essentially, man does not become divine, but in Christ can partake of divine nature. This Church's version of salvation restores the likeness of God in man. One such theme is release from mortality caused by desires of the world.

=== Lutheranism ===
At the time of the justification of an individual, the Lutheran churches teach that the process of sanctification commences, which is defined as "the Holy Spirit's work which follows justification through faith and consists of renewing the believer and bringing forth in him works of renewal". In Lutheranism, sanctification has two components, including: "1.) The inner renewal of the Holy Spirit in the Christian, and 2.) the living out of that inner renewal in the Christian's new life of good works." The Lutheran Confessions hold that it is "necessary to exhort people to Christian discipline and good works, and to remind them how necessary it is that they exercise themselves in good words as an evidence of their faith and their gratitude toward God". For Christians, "good works are necessary fruits of faith in the life of a Christian and that they proceed from a renewed heart that is thankful to God for His mercy and love". These good works done by Christians are rewarded by God. Those individuals who commit mortal sin "render themselves subject to divine wrath and eternal death unless, turned again, they are reconciled to God through faith". The Formula of Concord summarizes salvation in Lutheran Christianity:

First the Holy Spirit kindles faith in us in conversion through the hearing of the Gospel. Faith apprehends the grace of God in Christ whereby the person is justified. After the person is justified, the Holy Spirit next renews and sanctifies him, and from this renewal and sanctification the fruits of good works will follow." (FC, Solid Declaration, Article III, Righteousness, 40,41 [Tappert])

The Lutheran Confessions state:

"After a person has been justified by faith, a true living faith becomes 'active through love' (Gal. 5:6). Thus good works always follow justifying faith and are certainly to be found with it, since such faith is never alone but is always accompanied by love and hope." (FC, Epitome, Article III. Righteousness. Tappert p. 474)

We also reject and condemn the teaching that faith and the indwelling of the Holy Spirit are not lost through malicious sin, but that the holy ones and the elect retain the Holy Spirit even though they fall into adultery and other sins and persist in them. (FC, Article IV, Good Works)

Martin Luther taught in his Large Catechism that Sanctification is only caused by the Holy Spirit through the powerful Word of God. The Holy Spirit uses churches to gather believers together for the teaching and preaching of the Word of God.

Sanctification is the Holy Spirit's work of making us holy. When the Holy Spirit creates faith in us, he renews in us the image of God so that through his power we produce good works. These good works are not meritorious but show the faith in our hearts (Ephesians 2:8-10, James 2:18). Sanctification flows from justification. It is an on-going process which will not be complete or reach perfection in this life.

In the process of sanctification, humans cooperate with God, enabled by prevenient grace "for the Holy Spirit is given credit for our faith and for the surrender of the will to God (Romans 3:21-28; Galatians 3:10-14; Luther's Works, Vo.26, p.106; Small Catechism, II.6)." The Formula of Concord teaches: "But the intellect and will of the unregenerate man are nothing else than subiectum convertendum, that is, that which is to be converted, it being the intellect and will of a spiritually dead man, in whom the Holy Ghost works conversion and renewal, towards which work man's will that is to be converted does nothing, but suffers God alone to work in him, until he is regenerate; and then he works also with the Holy Ghost [cooperates] that which is pleasing to God in other good works that follow, in the way and to the extent fully set forth above" (SD II.90). The Lutheran churches teach that God rewards good works done by Christians; the Apology of the Augsburg Confession teaches: "We also affirm what we have often said, that although justification and eternal life go along with faith, nevertheless, good works merit other bodily and spiritual rewards and degrees of reward. According to 1 Corinthians 3:8, 'Each will receive his wages according to his labor.'"

Luther viewed the Ten Commandments as a means by which the Holy Spirit sanctifies:

"Thus we have the Ten Commandments, a commend of divine doctrine, as to what we are to do in order that our whole life may be pleasing to God, and the true fountain and channel from and in which everything must arise and flow that is to be a good work, so that outside of the Ten Commandments no work or thing can be good or pleasing to God, however great or precious it be in the eyes of the world...whoever does attain to them is a heavenly, angelic man, far above all holiness of the world. Only occupy yourself with them, and try your best, apply all power and ability, and you will find so much to do that you will neither seek nor esteem any other work or holiness."

Pietistic Lutheranism heavily emphasizes the "biblical divine commands of believers to live a holy life and to strive for holy living, or sanctification".

=== Anabaptism ===
Anabaptist belief emphasizes that sanctification is initiated by being born again by the Spirit of God and then practiced by following or being a disciple of Christ. The role of the Spirit, Word of God, suffering, self-denial as well as the community of believers in sanctification is also considered essential. Sanctification is believed to be a process that begins with conversion and continues throughout the Christian life. Perfectionism or eradication of the flesh is rejected and it is considered necessary to take up the cross and deny yourself daily to truly be a disciple of Christ. When a believer steps out of the sanctification process, his salvation is seen as jeopardized. Sanctification is seen as mortifying the deeds of the flesh, cleansing impure motives and thoughts of the mind and heart as well as glorifying the Father through worship, obedience and faith working in love.

=== Anglicanism ===
A 2002 Anglican publishing house book states that "there is no explicit teaching on sanctification in the Anglican formularies". A glossary of the Episcopal Church (USA) gives some teaching: "Anglican formularies have tended to speak of sanctification as the process of God's work within us by means of which we grow into the fullness of the redeemed life." Outside official formularies sanctification has been an issue in the Anglican Communion since its inception.

The 16th century Anglican theologian Richard Hooker (1554–1600) distinguished between the "righteousness of justification" that is imputed by God and the "righteousness of sanctification" that comprises the works one does as an "inevitable" result of being justified.

Jeremy Taylor (1613–1667) argued that justification and sanctification cannot be separated; they are "two steps in a long process".

A 19th century Church of England work agreed with Jeremy Taylor that justification and sanctification are "inseparable". However, they are not the same thing. Justification is "found in Christ's work alone". "Sanctification is the work of the Holy Spirit in us, and is a progressive work."

=== Baptist ===
Baptists believe in progressive sanctification, the work of sanctification of the believer through grace and the decisions of the believer after the new birth.

=== Reformed ===
It is not clear that John Calvin, in his Institutes of the Christian Religion, conceives of sanctification as a doctrine separate from justification. There is no separate treatment there of a doctrine of sanctification. Instead, the clearest references he makes to the process of the Christian's growth in holiness appear in Book III of the Institutes, which concerns the work of the Holy Spirit. There he intermixes the grace by which justification is accomplished and the grace that empowers the Christian toward moral reform. Following Augustine, Calvin embraces a non-perfectionist account of sanctification as progressive but incomplete until eschatological consummation:

"I insist not that the life of the Christian shall breathe nothing but the perfect Gospel, though this is to be desired, and ought to be attempted. I insist not so strictly on evangelical perfection, as to refuse to acknowledge as a Christian any man who has not attained it. In this way all would be excluded from the church, since there is no man who is not far removed from this perfection, while many, who have made but little progress, would be undeservedly rejected."

Against those who "maintain the perfection of holiness in the present life", Calvin replies:

"...we deem it sufficient briefly to reply with Augustine, that the goal to which all the pious ought to aspire is, to appear in the presence of God without spot or blemish; but as the course of the present life is at best nothing more than progress, we shall never reach the goal until we have laid aside the body of sin, and been completely united to the Lord."

But the imperfection of sanctification in this life is not, for Calvin, an excuse for slackness in the search thereof. The grace of justification is not separable from the grace that makes one perform good works and the grace that perfects what is deficient in the works of the regenerate:

"Justification, moreover, we thus define: the sinner being admitted into communion with Christ is, for his sake, reconciled to God; when purged by his blood he obtains the remission of sins, and clothed with righteousness, just as if it were his own, stands secure before the judgment seat of heaven. Forgiveness of sins being previously given, the good works which follow have a value different from their merit, because whatever is imperfect in them is covered by the perfection of Christ, and all their blemishes and pollutions are wiped away by his purity, so as never to come under the cognizance of the divine tribunal. The guilt of all transgressions, by which men are prevented from offering God an acceptable service, being thus effaced, and the imperfection which is wont to sully even good works being buried, the good works which are done by believers are deemed righteous, or, which is the same thing, are imputed for righteousness."

=== Methodism ===
In Wesleyan–Arminian theology, which is upheld by the Methodist churches (inclusive of the holiness movement), Methodism teaches that sanctification has three components—initial, progressive, and entire:

We believe that sanctification is that work of the Holy Spirit by which the child of God is separated from sin unto God and is enabled to love God with all the heart and to walk in all His holy commandments blameless. Sanctification is initiated at the moment of justification and regeneration. From that moment there is a gradual or progressive sanctification as the believer walks with God and daily grows in grace and in a more perfect obedience to God. This prepares for the crisis of entire sanctification which is wrought instantaneously when believers present themselves as living sacrifices, holy and acceptable to God, through faith in Jesus Christ, being effected by the baptism with the Holy Spirit who cleanses the heart from all inbred sin. The crisis of entire sanctification perfects the believer in love and empowers that person for effective service. It is followed by lifelong growth in grace and the knowledge of our Lord and Savior, Jesus Christ. The life of holiness continues through faith in the sanctifying blood of Christ and evidences itself by loving obedience to God's revealed will. —Articles of Religion, The Wesleyan Church

As such, "sanctification, the beginning of holiness, begins at the new birth". With the Grace of God, Methodists "do works of piety and mercy, and these works reflect the power of sanctification". Examples of these means of grace (works of piety and works of mercy) that aid with sanctification include frequent reception of the sacrament of Holy Communion (work of piety), and visiting the sick and those in prison (work of mercy).

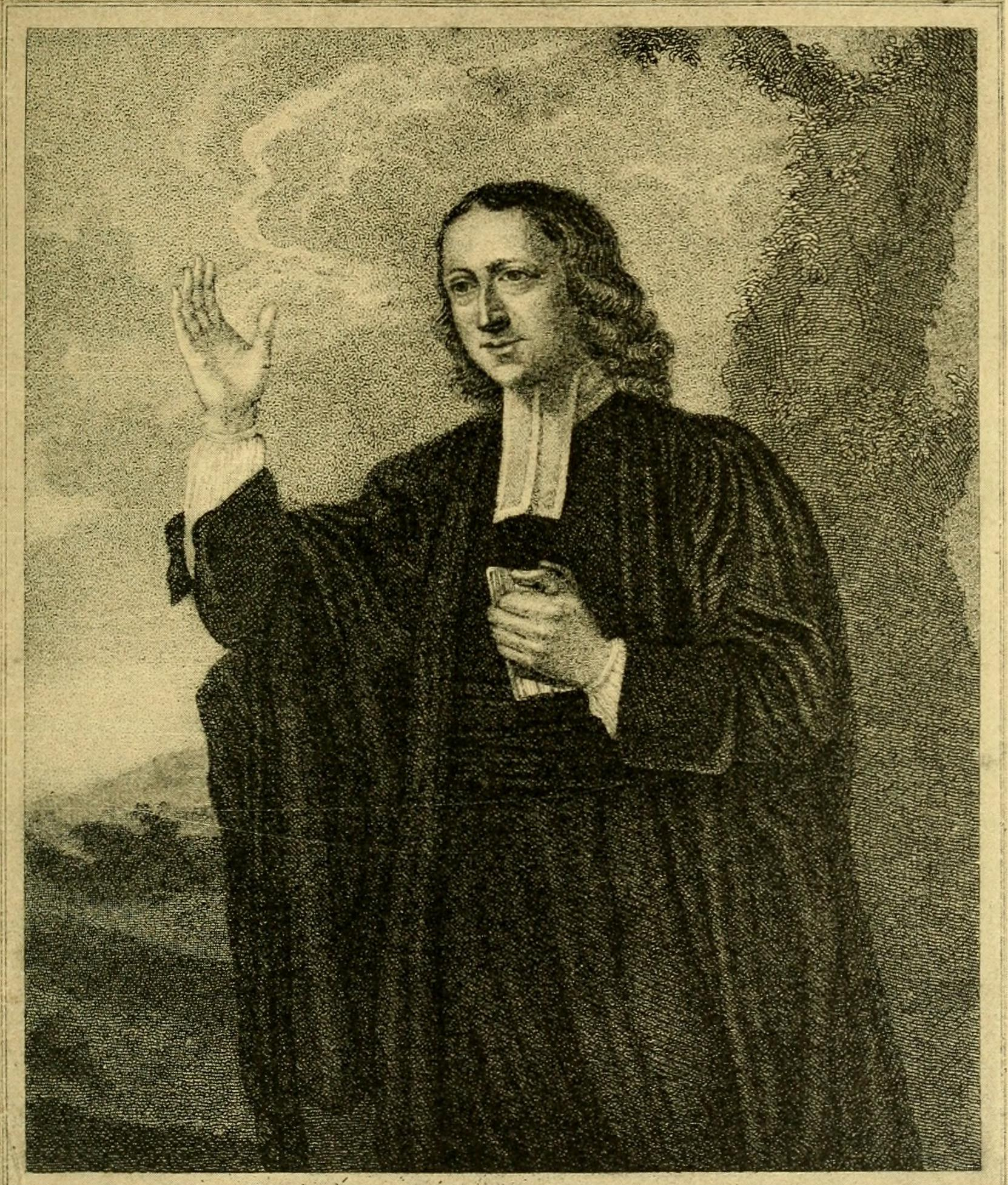
John Wesley held that the doctrine of entire sanctification was "the grand depositum" of Methodism.

Wesleyan covenant theology also emphasizes that an important aspect of sanctification is the keeping of the moral law contained in the Ten Commandments. As such, in "sanctification one grows to be more like Christ." This process of sanctification that begins at the new birth (first work of grace) has its goal as Christian perfection, otherwise known as entire sanctification (second work of grace), which John Wesley, the progenitor of the Methodist faith, described as a heart "habitually filled with the love of God and neighbor" and as "having the mind of Christ and walking as he walked". To John Wesley, the work of entire sanctification was distinctly separate from regeneration, and was "wrought instantaneously, though it may be approached by slow and gradual steps." A more complete statement of Wesley's position goes like this:

"It is that habitual disposition of soul which, in the sacred writings, is termed holiness; and which directly implies, the being cleansed from sin, 'from all filthiness both of flesh and spirit;' and, by consequence, the being endued with those virtues which were also in Christ Jesus; the being so 'renewed in the spirit of our mind,' as to be 'perfect as our Father in heaven is perfect.'"

This is the doctrine that by the power of God's sanctifying grace and attention upon the means of grace may cleanse a Christian of the corrupting influence of original sin in this life. It is expounded upon in the Methodist Articles of Religion:

Sanctification is that renewal of our fallen nature by the Holy Ghost, received through faith in Jesus Christ, whose blood of atonement cleanseth from all sin; whereby we are not only delivered from the guilt of sin, but are washed from its pollution, saved from its power, and are enabled, through grace, to love God with all our hearts and to walk in his holy commandments blameless.

Terming the experience of entire sanctification the baptism of the Holy Spirit, John William Fletcher, the systematic theologian of Methodism, emphasized that the experience of entire sanctification through the indwelling of the Holy Spirit cleanses the believer from original sin and empowers the believer for service to God.

Justification is seen as an initial step of acknowledging God's holiness, with sanctification as, through the grace and power of God, entering into it. A key scripture is Hebrews 12:14: "Follow after...holiness, without which no one shall see the Lord." The importance of "growth in grace", according to Methodist doctrine, is important before and after entire sanctification:

In order to maintain right relationship with God; it is necessary that we grow in grace (Eph. 4:15, 16; Col. 2:6, 7: I Pet. 1:5-10; II Pet. 3:18), both before and after sanctification. There is, however, a more abundant growth with increased fruitage after sanctification (John 15:2). To keep sanctified the soul must continually seek God's face and strength (Luke 21:36; Psalm 105:4). This is the maturing process of all Spirit-filled saints. —Articles of Religion, Immanuel Missionary Church

In the same vein, in addition to entire sanctification, the Kentucky Mountain Holiness Association affirms a belief in "the progressive growth in grace toward Christian maturity through a consistent Christian life of faith and good works".

Wesleyan theology teaches that the state of entire sanctification can be lost through willful sin:

After we have received the Holy Ghost, any careless attitude toward the covenant we entered into when we were sanctified shall cause us to depart from grace given, and to fall into sin. Only through deep repentance, which God may permit, shall we then turn to God and receive forgiveness of our sins. ―Principles of Faith, Emmanuel Association of Churches

If a person backslides but later decides to return to God, he or she must confess his or her sins and be entirely sanctified again (see conditional security).

John Wesley taught outward holiness as an expression of "inward transformation" and theologians in the Wesleyan/Methodist tradition have noted that the observance of standards of dress and behaviour should follow the new birth as an act of obedience to God.

=== Pentecostalism ===
There are two Pentecostal positions on sanctification, entire sanctification and progressive sanctification.

Entire sanctification as a second work of grace, is the position of Pentecostal denominations that originally had their roots in Wesleyan-Arminian theology, such as Apostolic Faith Church, Calvary Holiness Association, International Pentecostal Holiness Church, Church of God (Cleveland) and Church of God in Christ. These denominations differ from the Methodist churches (inclusive of the Holiness Movement) in that they teach the possibility of a third work of grace—glossolalia.

Progressive sanctification is the work of sanctification of the believer through grace and the decisions of the believer after the new birth. This is the position of other Pentecostal denominations, such as Assemblies of God and The Foursquare Church.

=== Quakerism ===
George Fox, the founder of Quakerism, taught Christian perfection, also known in the Friends tradition as "Perfectionism", in which the Christian believer could be made free from sin. In his Some Principles of the Elect People of God Who in Scorn are called Quakers, for all the People throughout all Christendome to Read over, and thereby their own States to Consider, he writes in section "XVI. Concerning Perfection":

HE that hath brought Man into Imperfection is the Devil, and his work who led from God; for Man was Perfect before he fell, for all God's Works are Perfect; So Christ that destroyes the Devil and his works, makes man Perfect again, destroying him that made him Imperfect, which the Law could not do; so by his Blood doth he cleanse from all Sin; And by one offering, hath he Perfected for ever them that are Sanctified; And they that do not Believe in the Light which comes from Christ, by which they might see the Offering, and receive the Blood, are in the unbelief concerning this. And the Apostles that were in the Light, Christ Jesus, (which destroyes the Devil and his works) spoke Wisdom among them that were Perfect, though they could not among those that were Carnal; And their Work was for the perfecting of the Saints, for that cause had they their Ministry given to them until they all came to the Knowledge of the Son of God, which doth destroy the Devil and his works, And which ends the Prophets, first Covenant, Types, Figures, Shadowes; And until they all came to the Unity of the Faith which purified their hearts, which gave them Victory over that which seperated [sic] from God, In which they had access to God, by which Faith they pleased him, by which they were Justified; And so until they came unto a Perfect Man, unto the Measure of the Stature of the fulness of Christ; and so the Apostle said, Christ in you we Preach the hope of Glory, warning every man, that we might present every Man Perfect in Christ Jesus.

The early Quakers, following Fox, taught that as a result of the New Birth through the power of the Holy Spirit, man could be free from actual sinning if he continued to rely on the inward light and "focus on the cross of Christ as the center of faith". George Fox emphasized "personal responsibility for faith and emancipation from sin" in his teaching on perfectionism. For the Christian, "perfectionism and freedom from sin were possible in this world".

Some Quaker denominations were founded to emphasize this teaching, such as the Central Yearly Meeting of Friends.

=== Keswickianism ===
Keswickian theology, which emerged in the Higher Life Movement, teaches a second work of grace that occurs through "surrender and faith", in which God keeps an individual from sin. Keswickian denominations, such as the Christian and Missionary Alliance, differ from the Wesleyan-Holiness movement in that the Christian and Missionary Alliance does not see entire sanctification as cleansing one from original sin, whereas holiness denominations espousing the Wesleyan-Arminian theology affirm this belief.

=== The Church of Jesus Christ of Latter-day Saints ===
In the Church of Jesus Christ of Latter-day Saints, sanctification is viewed as a process and gift from God which makes every willing member holy, according to their repentance and righteous efforts, through the Savior Jesus Christ's matchless grace. To become Sanctified, or Holy, one must do all that he can to live as Christ lived, according to the teachings of Christ. One must strive to live a holy life to truly be considered Holy. In the Church's scriptural canon, one reference to sanctification appears in Helaman 3:35, in the Book of Mormon:

Nevertheless they did fast and pray oft, and did wax stronger and stronger in their humility, and firmer and firmer in the faith of Christ, unto the filling their souls with joy and consolation, yea, even to the purifying and the sanctification of their hearts, which sanctification cometh because of their yielding their hearts unto God.

Elder Dallin H. Oaks, then of the Quorum of the Twelve Apostles, also expounded on the meaning of sanctity.

== See also ==
- Charisma
- Consecration
- Divine Grace
- Glorification
- Imparted righteousness
- Justification (theology)
- Means of Grace
- Righteousness
- Social Gospel
