= Repentance in Christianity =

Attitude of sorrow in Christianity involving turning away from sin

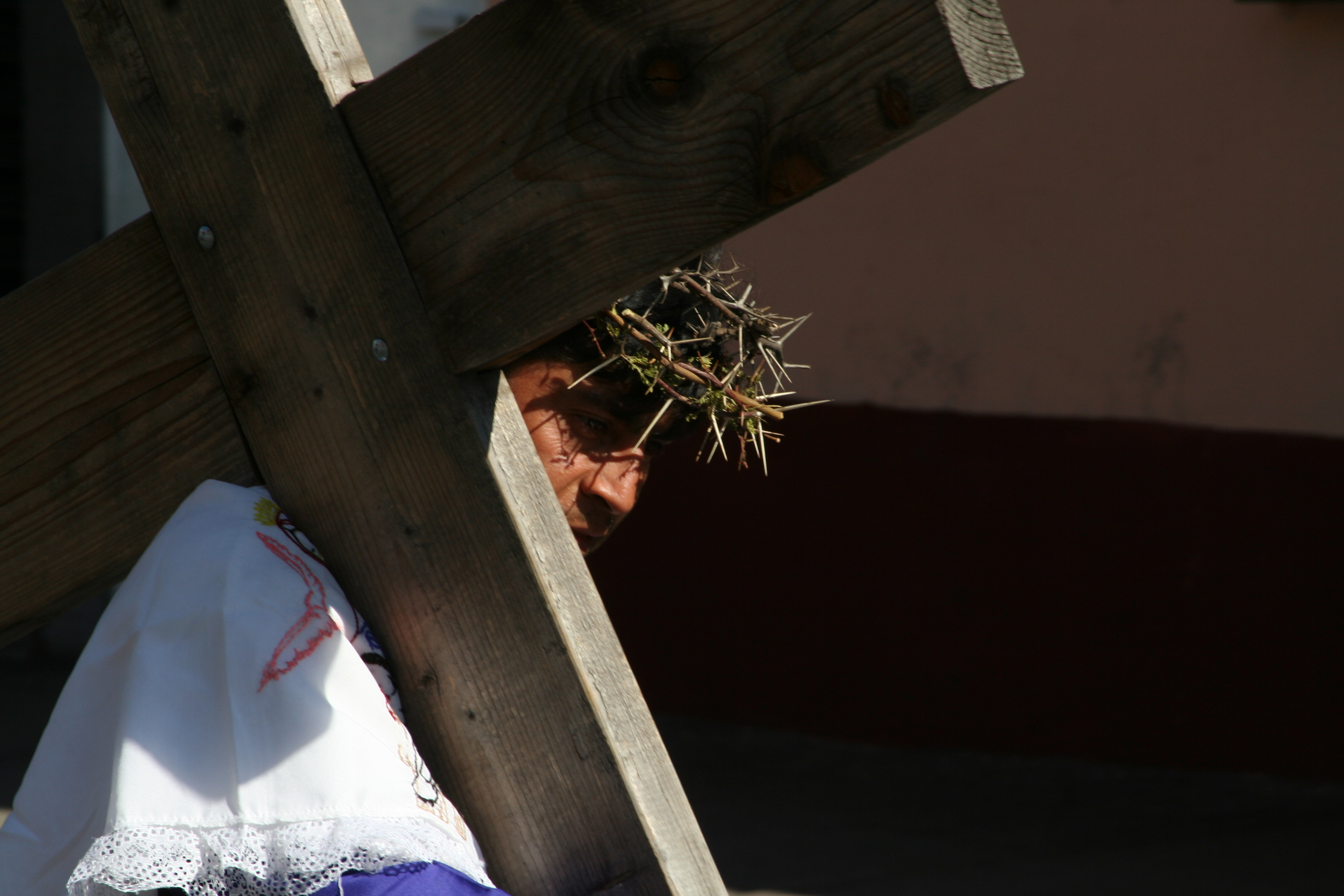
Some faithful manifest repentance through penance and mortification of the flesh.

Repentance (a term related to Greek: μετάνοια, romanized: metanoia), in Christianity, refers to being sorrowful for having committed sin and then turning away from sin toward a life of holiness.

In certain Christian traditions, such as Catholic theology, Lutheran theology, Orthodox theology and Anglican theology, repentance plays a key role in confession and absolution. It can specifically refer to a stage in Christian salvation in which an individual gains awareness of God's standard, acknowledges their past or present wrongdoings, and deliberately turns away from sin toward God; its numeration as a stage in the ordo salutis varies with the Christian denomination, with the Reformed theological tradition arguing it occurs after faith. Christian denominations that adhere to the liturgical kalendar, such as Catholicism, Lutheranism, Moravianism and Anglicanism, focus on repentance during the season of Lent, while emphasizing its importance in the life of the believer throughout the year.

== Origins ==
In the Hebrew Bible, the term repentance comes from the Hebrew word group that means "turn away from". David Lambert believes that "It is in the writings of rabbinic Judaism and early Christianity that it attains the status of a technical term, a basic item of an emerging religious lexicon".

In the New Testament, John the Baptist called for repentance during his speeches. Jesus also called for repentance when he proclaimed the gospel for salvation. It was a focal point in the preaching of the apostles Peter and Paul.

In the New Testament, metanoia (Biblical Greek: μετανοέω) can mean remorse but is generally translated as a turning away from sin (Matthew 3:2). Theologically, 'repentance', the turning away from sin is linked to a corresponding turn to faith in God.

Emanuel Swedenborg and Jonathan S. Rose explain how repentance in the church as a whole is used to take away the serious evils that God cannot overlook; Swedenborg and Rose explain how "acts of repentance include any and all actions that result in our not willing, and consequently not doing, evil things that are sins against God." For repentance to be achievable one must think of it using their will or real self and the thinking must be done by their will. Swedenborg and Rose refer to John the Baptist to describe how he was performing baptism of repentance. John the Baptist would preach repentance along with the other disciples and the Lord himself along with performing the baptisms. If people repented then their sins were forgiven and they were welcomed into the church.

== Theology ==
=== Catholicism ===
In Catholic theology, repentance is fundamental to forgiveness.

Jesus' call to conversion and penance ... does not aim first at outward works ... but at the conversion of the heart, interior conversion (1430). Interior repentance is a radical reorientation of our whole life, a return, a conversion to God with all our heart, an end of sin, a turning away from evil, ... the desire and resolution to change one's life, with hope in God's mercy and trust in the help of his grace (1431).

This is elaborated on by bishop George Hay, who in his catechism answers the question, What are the principal parts of which true repentance is composed?

The principal parts of true repentance are these three: (1.) A sincere regret and sorrow of heart for our having offended so good a God by sin. (2.) A firm and determined resolution of never offending Him again, followed by an effectual change of life and manners. (3.) A voluntary punishing of ourselves for the sins we have committed, in order to repair the injury done to God by sin, and to satisfy, in some measure, His offended justice."

For Catholics, where there is mortal sin, use of the Sacrament of Reconciliation must follow.

=== Protestantism ===
==== Lutheran ====
The Augsburg Confession (known in Latin as Confessio Augustana) is the primary confession of faith used in the Lutheran Church. It is one of the most important documents of the Protestant Reformation. It divides repentance into two parts:

- "One is contrition, that is, terrors smiting the conscience through the knowledge of sin;"
- "The other is faith, which is born of the Gospel, or of absolution, and believes that for Christ's sake, sins are forgiven, comforts the conscience, and delivers it from terrors."

==== Reformed ====
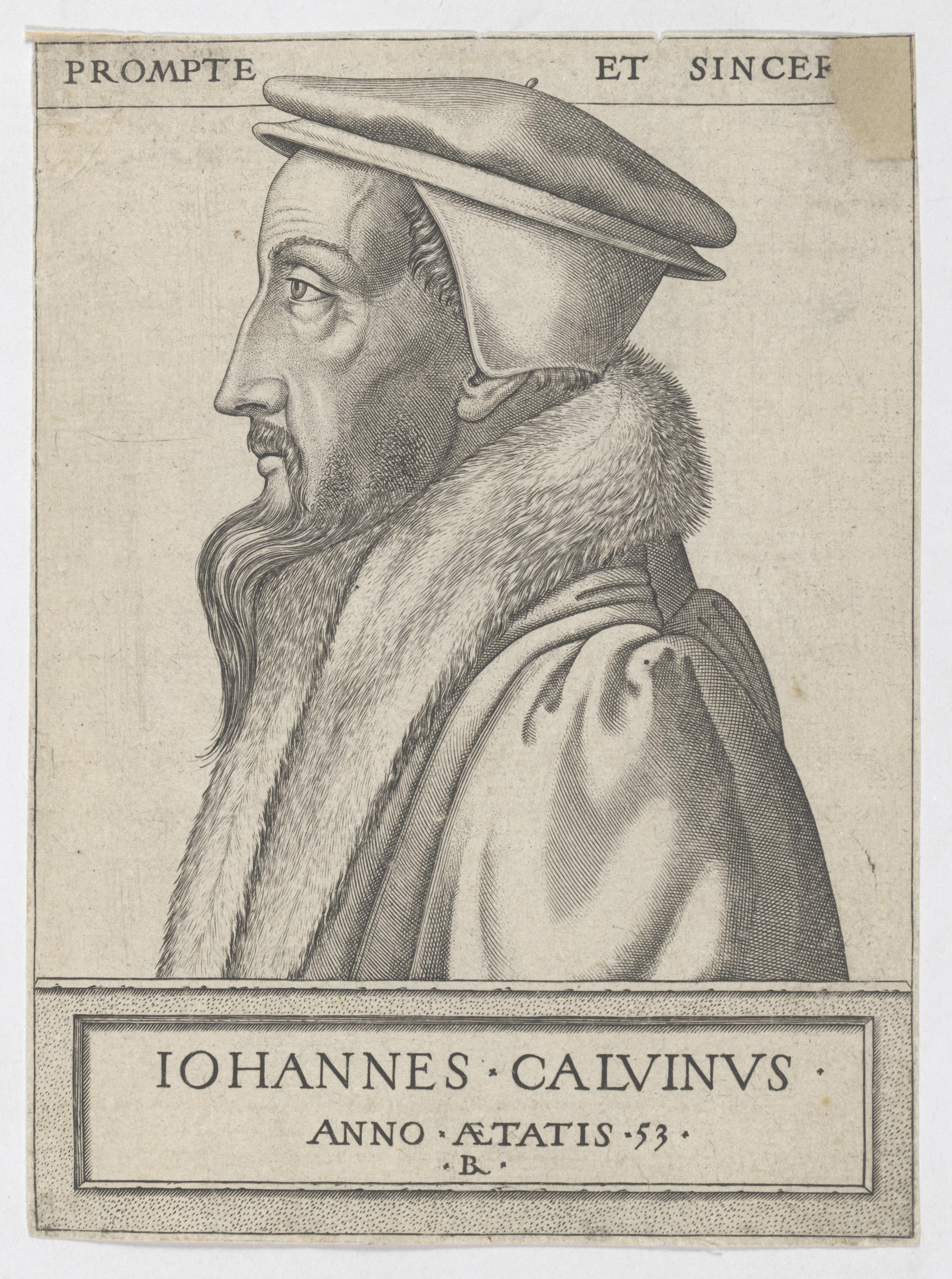
John Calvin in an engraving by René Boyvin.

In the Reformed tradition, John Calvin wrote that repentance "may be justly defined to be a true conversion of our life to God, proceeding from a serious fear of God, and consisting in the mortification of the flesh and of the old man, and in the vivification of the Spirit." He further said that "it will be useful to amplify and explain the definition we have given; in which there are three points to be particularly considered".

In the first place, when we call repentance 'a conversion of the life to God', we require a transformation, not only in the external actions, but in the soul itself; which, after having put off the old nature, should produce the fruits of actions corresponding to its renovation....

In the second place, we represented repentance as proceeding from a serious fear of God. For before the mind of a sinner can be inclined to repentance, it must be excited by the knowledge of the Divine judgment.

It remains for us, in the third place, to explain our position, that repentance consists of two parts—the mortification of the flesh and the vivification of the spirit.... Both these branches of repentance effects our participation of Christ. For if we truly partake of his death, our old man is crucified by its power, and the body of sin expires, so that the corruption of our former nature loses all its vigor.... If we are partakers of his resurrection, we are raised by it to a newness of life, which corresponds with the righteousness of God." [Quotes from A Compend of the Institutes of the Christian Religion by John Calvin edited by Hugh T. Kerr, The Westminster Press-Philadelphia 1939.]

==== Methodism ====
In Methodist theology:

Genuine repentance toward God consists in a knowledge of, a sorry for, and a confession and forsaking of sins, brought about by the knowledge of goodness and severity of God through the truth, by the convincing power of the Holy Spirit (Matt. 3:2; Acts 20:21; II Cor. 7:10, 11; I John 1:9; first clause). —Articles of Religion, Immanuel Missionary Church

Repentance is part of Christian life and the process of sanctification.

==== Free Grace theology ====
Free grace theology approaches repentance in a different way than most other Christian traditions; Free Grace theologians have generally held one of three views on repentance:

A major number of Free Grace theologians have taught that repentance (metanoia) should be treated as a change of mind not as a turning from sin or sorrow for sin. Thus, in this view repentance is viewed as a synonym for faith.

A second view was suggested by Zane C. Hodges in which repentance is defined as turning from one's sins, but repentance is not a requirement for eternal life, only faith in Christ. Zane Hodges presented this view in his book "Harmony with God", where he argued that repentance is not a condition of salvation, but is a condition of fellowship with God and sanctification. However, repentance may be preached to unbelievers, in which case it makes one more disposed to faith in Christ. In this view, passages such as Luke 13:3 are viewed temporarily and corporately, Zane Hodges argued that Jesus is warning the nation of Israel of the destruction of Judea by the Romans.

Joseph Dillow taught instead that repentance refers to remorse or regret for sin, in his view being a necessary pre-condition of faith. However, Dillow rejected the view that repentance should be viewed as commitment to Christ.

=== Nondenominational Christianity ===
In Nondenominational Christianity, especially such churches aligned with evangelicalism, repentance is held to be necessary for salvation and new birth. It is the subject of special invitations during sermons and services.

== See also ==
- Contrition
