= Means of grace =

Means through which God gives grace

The means of grace in Christian theology are those practices or instruments (the means) through which God bestows grace. The nature of this grace is understood in various ways: generally speaking, some interpret it as God's blessing upon humankind that sustains and strengthens the Christian life, while others understand it as forgiveness and salvation.

== Catholic theology ==
According to the Catholic Church, the means of grace that Christ entrusted to the Church are many. They include the entirety of revealed truth, the sacraments and the hierarchical ministry. Among the principal means of grace are the sacraments (especially the Eucharist), prayers and good works. The sacramentals also are means of grace.

The Church itself is used by Christ as a means of grace: "As sacrament, the Church is Christ's instrument. 'She is taken up by him also as the instrument for the salvation of all', 'the universal sacrament of salvation'." The conviction that the Church herself is the primary means of grace can be traced back to Irenaeus, who was expressing a common conviction when he said: "Where the church is, there is the Spirit of God; and where the Spirit of God is, there is the church, and every kind of grace." However, as the Second Vatican Council lamented, "although the Catholic Church has been endowed with all divinely revealed truth and with all means of grace, yet its members fail to live by them with all the fervor that they should". Catholics, Orthodox and some Protestants agree that grace is conferred through the sacraments, "the means of grace". It is the sacrament itself that is the means of grace, not the person who administers it nor the person who receives it, although lack of the required dispositions on the part of the recipient will block the effectiveness of the sacrament.

== Lutheran theology ==
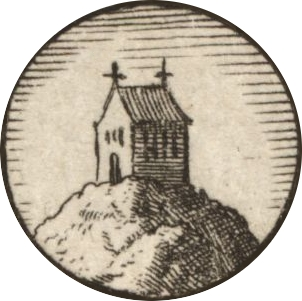
The Church is the congregation of saints, in which the gospel is taught and the sacraments are rightly administered. – Augsburg Confession

In Lutheranism, the means of grace are God's instruments by which all spiritual blessing are bestowed upon sinners. Lutheran churches teach that the means of grace are the ways that the Holy Spirit creates faith in the hearts of Christians, forgives their sins, and gives them eternal salvation. The efficacy of these means does not depend on the faith, strength, status, or good works of those who proclaim the Word of God or administer God's sacraments; rather, the efficacy of these means rests in God alone, who has promised to work through God's gift of these means to God's church.

For Lutherans, the means of grace include the gospel (both written and proclaimed) (Romans 10:17), as well as the sacrament of Holy Baptism, and the Sacrament of the Eucharist. Some Lutherans also include Confession and Absolution as sacraments and as such a means of grace, although they are not counted as such by others because no physical element is attached to Absolution, as is the case in both Baptism and the Lord's Supper.

=== Gospel in Word ===
Lutherans believe that through the gospel, the good news of Christ's atoning sacrifice for all sinners, the Holy Spirit creates and strengthens faith in people, whose hearts are by nature hostile to God (1 Peter 1:23). Lutheranism teaches that faith comes from hearing the word of Christ and that the Spirit-worked faith brings about a regeneration in humans and "makes them heirs of eternal life in heaven".

=== Baptism ===
Lutheranism teaches that also through the Sacrament of Baptism the Holy Spirit applies the gospel to sinners, giving them regeneration (Titus 3:5) and cleansing them from all sin (Acts 2:38). Lutherans believe that Jesus Christ points to the blessing of Holy Baptism when he promises that "whoever believes and is baptized will be saved" (Mark 16:16). Lutherans also believe that Baptism is for all people (Matthew 28:19), including infants.

=== Lord's Supper ===
Lutherans hold that within the Eucharist, also referred to as the Lord's Supper, the true body and blood of Christ are truly present "in, with, and under the forms" of the consecrated bread and wine for all those who eat and drink it. Lutheranism teaches that as Christians receive his body and blood, they also receive the forgiveness of sin (Matthew 26:28) and the comfort and assurance that they are truly his own. Unbelievers also receive Jesus Christ's body and blood, "but to their judgment" (1 Corinthians 11:29).

== Reformed theology ==
The Reformed churches refer to the ordinary means of grace as the Word (preached primarily, but also read) and the sacraments (baptism and the Lord's Supper). In addition to these means of grace recognized by the Continental Reformed (Dutch, etc.), the English Reformed also included prayer as a means of grace along with the Word and Sacraments (Westminster Larger Catechism 154; Westminster Shorter Catechism 88). The means of grace are not intended to include every means by which God may edify Christians, but are the ordinary channels he has ordained for this purpose and are communicated to Christians supernaturally by the Holy Spirit. For Reformed Christians divine grace is the action of God giving and Christians receiving the promise of eternal life united with Christ. The means of grace are used by God to confirm or ratify a covenant between himself and Christians. The words of the gospel and the elements of the sacraments are not merely symbols referring to the gospel, they actually bring about the reality of the gospel.

== Methodist theology ==
In Methodism, the means of grace are ways in which God works invisibly in disciples, quickening, strengthening and confirming faith. So, believers use them to open their hearts and lives to God's work in them. According to John Wesley, the founder of Methodism, the means of grace can be divided into two broad categories, with individual and communal components:

Works of Piety, such as:

Individual Practices--

Prayer
Fasting
Searching the Scriptures
Healthy Living

Communal Practices--

Worship
Holy Communion
Baptism
Christian Conferencing (or "community")

Works of Mercy, such as:

Individual practices--

Doing Good (Good works)
Visiting the Sick
Visiting the Imprisoned
Feeding and Clothing those in need
Earning, Saving, and Giving

Communal practices--

the Seeking of Justice; Opposition to slavery

Careful attention to the means of grace is, for Methodists, important in the process of sanctification as one is moved on toward Christian Perfection through the work of the Holy Spirit. In Methodist theology, the means of grace are necessary in the maintenance of the Christian faith; the Emmanuel Association, a Methodist denomination in the conservative holiness movement, thus teaches:

No one can remain a Christian without the aid of the various means of grace such as assembling together for prayer and worship; observing family and secret devotion; and giving liberally to the work of the church, the support of the ministry, the relief of the needy, and the spread of the gospel throughout the world.―Principles of Holy Living, Emmanuel Association of Churches

== See also ==
- Prevenient Grace
- Christian soteriology

== Printed resources ==
- Felton, Gayle. By Water and the Spirit. 1998. ISBN 0-88177-201-1
- Felton, Gayle. This Holy Mystery. 2005. ISBN 0-88177-457-X
- Neal, Gregory. Grace Upon Grace: Sacramental Theology and the Christian Life. 2014. ISBN 1490860061
- Pieper, Francis. Christian Dogmatics. Volume III. Theodore Engelder, trans. Concordia, 1953. ISBN 0-570-06714-6
- Underwood, Ralph. Pastoral Care and the Means of Grace. Augsburg Fortress, 1992. ISBN 0-8006-2589-7
- The Presence of God in the Christian Life: John Wesley and the Means of Grace, Henry H. Knight III (Metuchen, N.J., The Scarecrow Press, Inc. 1992)
