= Backsliding =

Abandonment of the practice of Christianity through sin

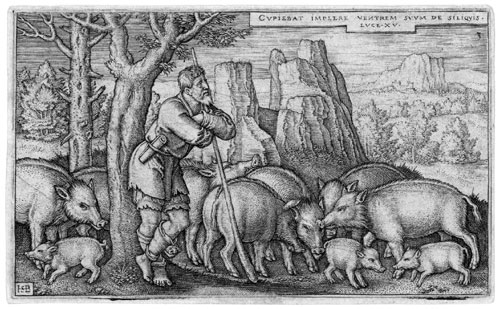
Engraving of the Prodigal Son as a swineherd by Hans Sebald Beham, 1538

Backsliding, also known as falling away or described as "committing apostasy", is a term used within Christianity to describe a process by which an individual who has converted to Christianity reverts to pre-conversion habits and/or lapses or falls into sin, when a person turns from God to pursue their own desire. To revert to sin or wrongdoing, especially in religious practice, someone lapses into previous undesirable patterns of behavior. To be faithful, thus to believe backsliding is a reversion, in principle upholds the Apostle Paul’s condition in salvation: "If you declare with your mouth, 'Jesus is Lord,' and believe in your heart that God raised him from the dead, you will be saved." (Romans 10:9)

In Christianity, within the Roman Catholic Church as well as those denominations which teach Arminianism (such as the Methodist churches), backsliding is a state which any free-willed believer is capable of adopting. This belief is rejected by Reformed Christians endorsing the perseverance of the saints doctrine. In these denominations, it is taught that the backslidden individual is in danger of eventually going to Hell if he does not repent (see conditional security). Historically, backsliding was considered a trait of the Biblical Israel which would turn from the Abrahamic God to follow idols. In the New Testament church (see Acts of the Apostles and Christianity in the 1st century), the story of the Prodigal Son has become a representation of a backslider who repented.

== Non-Christian religions ==
Backsliding, or sometimes entropa, is also used by Buddhists and Zen practitioners, there is optimism in making oneself resolved in following a way and in practice; "Making a resolve, even if we fall down, generates its own merit which will bear fruit in our future success if we do not give up."

== See also ==
- Antinomianism
- Apostasy in Christianity
- Conditional preservation of the saints
- Lapsi (Christianity)
- Perseverance of the saints
