= Works of piety =

Spiritual disciplines in Methodism

"Works of piety", in Methodism, are certain spiritual disciplines that along with the "works of mercy", serve as a means of grace, in addition to being manifestations of growing in grace and of having received Christian perfection (entire sanctification). All Methodist Christians, laity and ordained, are expected to employ them. The Works of Piety are:

1. Prayer
2. Searching the Scriptures
3. Holy Communion
4. Fasting
5. Christian community
6. Healthy living

The interior works of piety are paralleled by the external Works of Mercy. John Wesley insisted that the works of piety were important because they "further ensconced believers in a spiritual world of conflict in which humans needed to pursue holiness with the same vigor with which they sought their justification." In relation to soteriology, the grace of God was "all sufficient," and it issued in a universal atonement that made possible a saving "change of heart;" this change of heart required "the influences of divine grace," but it also required "constant exertions."
