= Aldersgate Day =

Methodist commemorative day

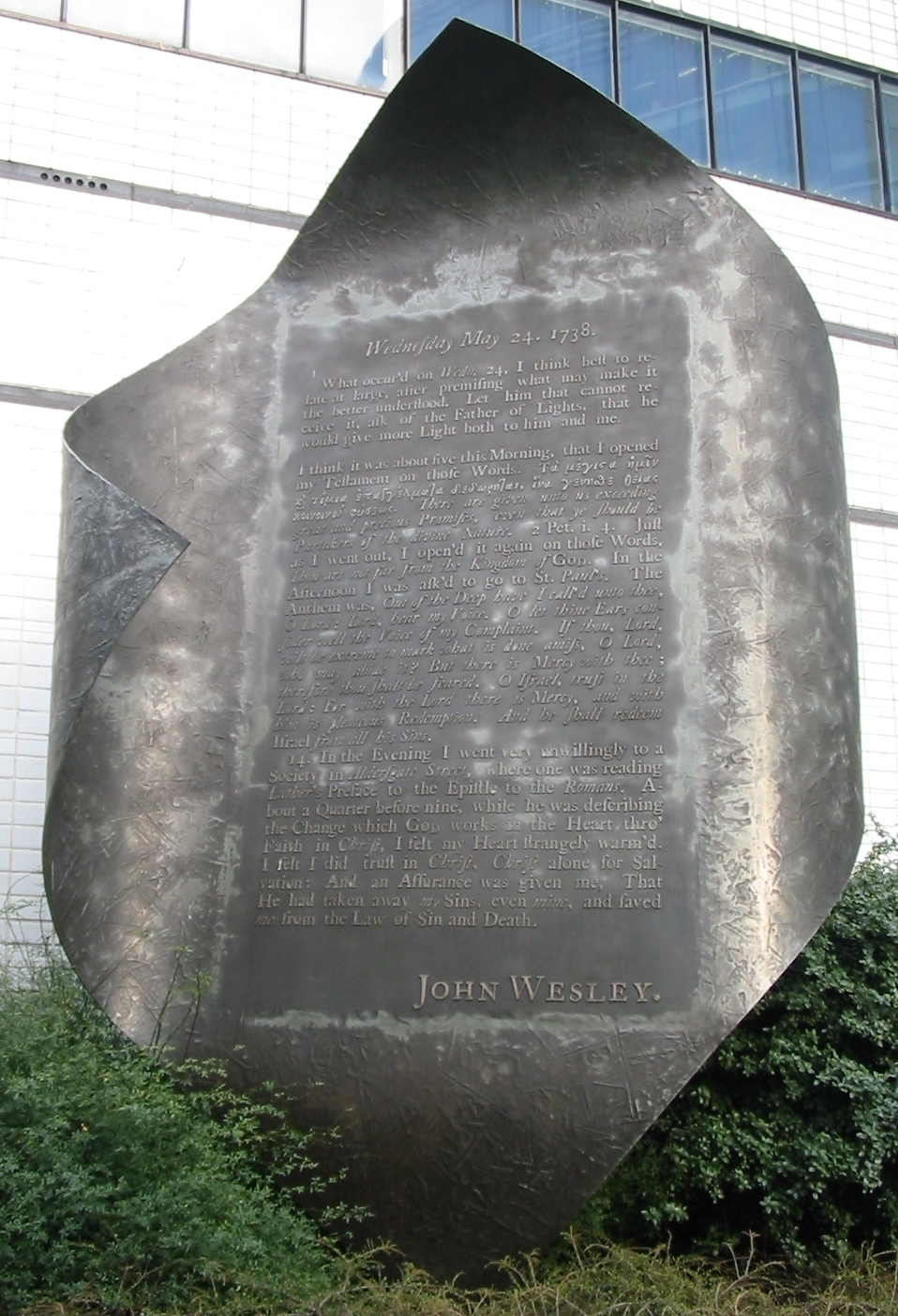
- This monument marks the approximate location of John Wesley's "Aldersgate experience", in London. It features Wesley's account of the experience, taken from his journal.
- Observed by: Methodists
- Type: Christianity
- Significance: Commemorates the founding of John Wesley's ministry and the Methodist movement
- Celebrations: Church services
- Date: 24 May
- Next time: 24 May 2027
- Frequency: Annual
- Related to: Aldersgate Sunday

Aldersgate Day, or Wesley Day, is an anniversary observed by Methodist Christians on 24 May. It recalls the day in 1738 when Church of England priest John Wesley attended a group meeting in Aldersgate, London, where he received an experience of assurance of his new birth. This was the pivotal event in Wesley's life that ultimately led to the development of the Methodist movement in Britain and America, with Wesley "preaching the Gospel to all who would listen with renewed vigour and evangelistic fervour".

In the calendars of several Methodist denominations, such as the Methodist Church in Singapore, the Methodist Church of Great Britain and the United Methodist Church, the event is publicly commemorated in church services on the Sunday before 24 May (or on the anniversary itself if that date falls on a Sunday), called Aldersgate Sunday.

== The "Aldersgate experience" ==
According to his journal, Wesley found that his enthusiastic gospel message had been rejected by his Anglican brothers. Heavy-hearted, he reluctantly attended a group meeting that evening in a Moravian meeting house (the Fetter Lane Society) on Aldersgate Street in London. It was there, while someone was reading from Martin Luther's Preface to the Epistle to the Romans, that he felt that his heart was "strangely warmed". He describes it as:

I felt I did trust in Christ, Christ alone, for salvation; and an assurance was given me that he had taken away my sins, even mine, and saved me from the law of sin and death.

Daniel L. Burnett called this event Wesley's "Evangelical Conversion", even though he was already a priest. In 1739 Wesley broke with the Moravians and founded a new society, which would become the Methodist movement.

== Date and commemoration ==
Methodists may privately commemorate the event on 24 May; churches will also mark it with services. The United Methodist Church has produced a special liturgy to be used for Aldersgate Day. The United Methodist Church also celebrates Heritage Sunday on Aldersgate Day or the preceding Sunday. Previously Heritage Sunday was held on 23 April (the date in 1968 of the church union which created the United Methodist Church) or the Sunday following that date, but in 2004 the United Methodist General Conference moved Heritage Day to coincide with Aldersgate Day. In Britain, Wesley's Aldersgate experience is celebrated publicly on the Sunday preceding 24 May if that day is not a Sunday.

John Wesley was a priest of the Church of England. In that church's Common Worship service book, published in 2000, Aldersgate Day was included in the calendar as a commemoration of both John Wesley and his brother, Charles.

Shirley Murray's hymn "How Small a Spark Has Lit a Living Fire!" celebrates Wesley's Aldersgate experience and was written in 1988 for the 250th anniversary of the event.
