= Justification from eternity =

Protestant concept

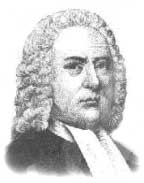
John Gill, an early proponent of the doctrine of justification from eternity.

Justification from eternity is a concept within Protestant theology asserting that the justification of a believer takes place at least partially in eternity past.

Justification from eternity is not part of mainstream Protestant theology, and is explicitly rejected by the Westminster Confession of Faith, which asserts,

God did, from all eternity, decree to justify all the elect, and Christ did, in the fullness of time, die for their sins, and rise again for their justification: nevertheless, they are not justified, until the Holy Spirit does, in due time, actually apply Christ unto them.

Reformed orthodox theologians taught that justification is part of an order of salvation, and that it follows effectual calling and a person actually believing. Francis Turretin in his Institutes of Elenctic Theology speaks of some who teach instead that justification was actually executed eternally. He agrees that justification was decreed eternally, but counters that actual execution occurs during people's lives. Justification from eternity is the teaching that justification itself is eternal rather than temporal, and that it occurs before faith rather than after it.

Justification from eternity has been described as a "chief tenet of Antinomian Hyper-Calvinism," Early antinomians John Eaton and John Saltmarsh taught that justification precedes faith, though they did not specifically teach the doctrine of justification from eternity, and William Twisse taught that at least in some sense justification precedes faith. Justification from eternity seems to have been taught by William Pemble, and it was one of the charges against Anne Hutchinson. Tobias Crisp was one of the most notorious teachers of this view. It was later propounded by John Gill. Referring to Ephesians 1:3-4, Gill argued that "justification is one of those spiritual blessings wherewith the elect are blessed in Christ according to election-grace, before the foundation of the world."

Another exponent of this doctrine was Abraham Kuyper. G. C. Berkouwer notes Kuyper's view came out of a belief that "justification does not originate through faith but that it is only accepted in and through faith."

Opponents of the doctrine have countered with the argument that it undermines justification by faith.

== See also ==
- Conclusions of Utrecht
