= John Eaton =

John Eaton may refer to:

- John Eaton (divine) (born 1575), English divine
- John Eaton (pirate) (fl. 1683–1686), English buccaneer
- Sir John Craig Eaton (1876–1922), Canadian businessman
- John Craig Eaton II (born 1937), Canadian businessman and grandson of Sir John Craig Eaton
- John David Eaton (1909–1973), Canadian businessman
- John Eaton (politician) (1790–1856), American politician and diplomat from Tennessee
- John Eaton (composer) (1935–2015), American composer
- John Eaton (pianist) (1934–2026), American music teacher and pianist
- John Eaton (educator) (1829–1906), U.S. Commissioner of education
- Jack Eaton (1888–1968), American film producer and director
- John Eaton (Royal Navy officer) (1902–1981), British admiral
- John Eaton (cricketer) (1902–1972), English cricketer who played for Sussex
- John P. Eaton (1926–2021), American author

== See also ==
- John Etton (died 1433), MP for Yorkshire
- John Eatton Le Conte (1784–1860), American naturalist
