= Carl Cameron =

American journalist

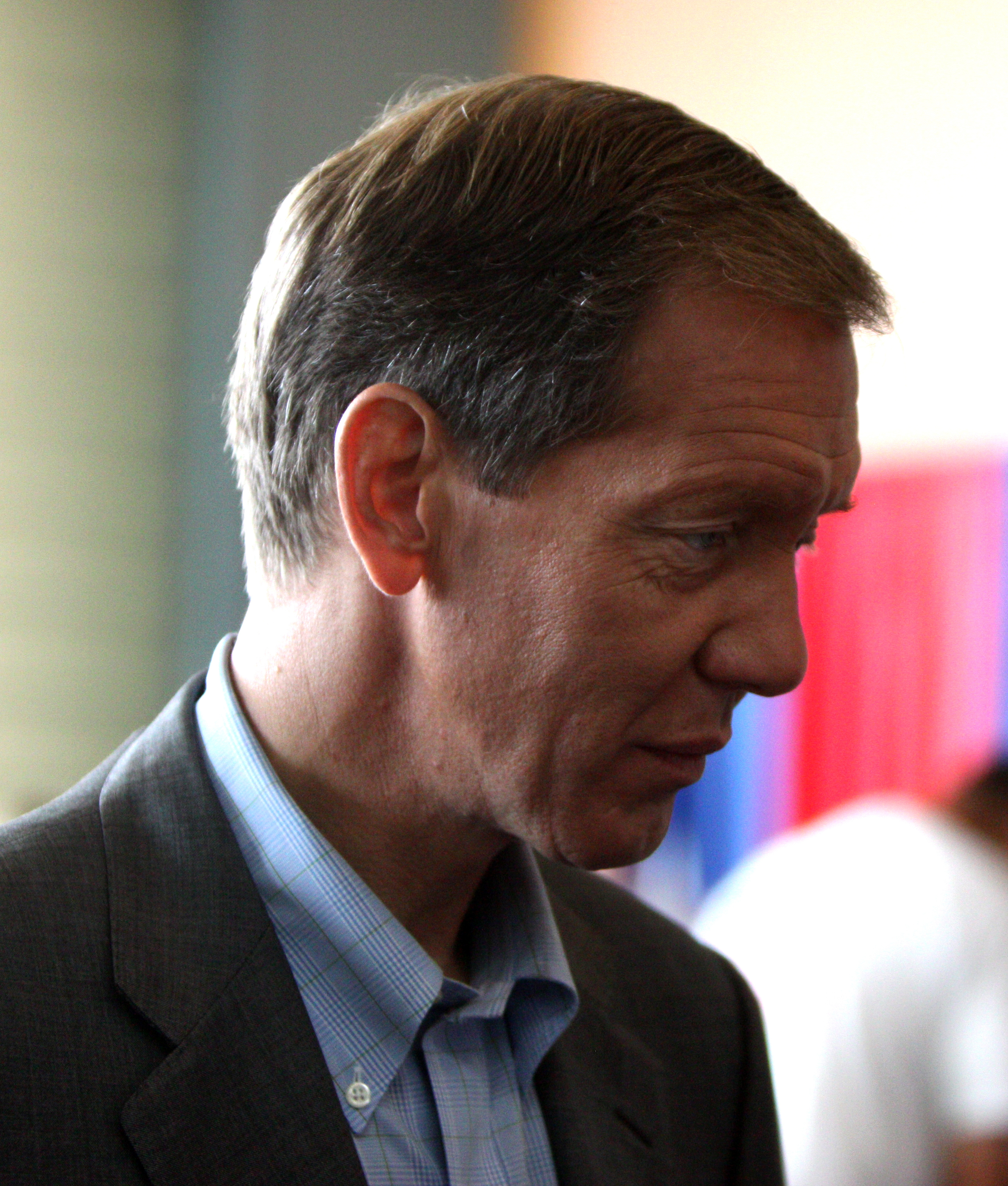
- Cameron in September 2011
- Born: September 22, 1961 (age 65); United States
- Occupations: Television personality, journalist
- Spouse: Moira Hopkins

Carl Cameron (born September 22, 1961, as Karl Emil Othmar Lamberg-Karlovsky) is an American journalist and was a reporter for Fox News for two decades. In 2019 he founded the progressive news aggregator, Front Page Live, where he was chief political correspondent.

== Life and career ==
As a child Cameron spent time in Iran, where his Jewish father C.C. Lamberg-Karlovsky, a distinguished member of the Harvard faculty, worked as an archaeologist. He grew up in New Hampshire and attended Bates College. He began his media career in 1985 at radio stations WFEA and WZID in Manchester, New Hampshire, first being hired as a salesman at WFEA and breaking into broadcasting when the weather man was sick one day. Later he worked as political director for WMUR-TV, the ABC affiliate in Manchester.

In 1995, Fox News hired Cameron, and he covered the 1996 presidential election. He joined Fox News full-time as its first Capitol Hill Correspondent in 1996 and has since covered every presidential election; Shepard Smith dubbed him "Campaign Carl" and he is often introduced on-air by that nickname.

After the 2000 elections, Fox News named Cameron its first Chief Political Correspondent, and after the 2004 elections, he was named its first Chief White House Correspondent. In June 2006, Cameron returned to his job as Chief Political Correspondent to cover the 2006 midterm elections and prepare for the 2008 presidential campaign.

Stories he has broken include George W. Bush's 1976 drunk driving arrest, as well as Israel's involvement in surveillance on US federal officials and agencies such as the Drug Enforcement Administration leading up to 9/11, including inconclusive reports of Israeli foreknowledge of al-Qa'ida activities prior to the attacks.

On August 22, 2017, Cameron announced his retirement from Fox News. In June 2019, he founded the progressive news aggregator, Front Page Live, together with Joe Romm, its Editor-in-Chief, Stacy Whittle, Dara Brewton, John Eaton, his wife Moira Hopkins, and others. Cameron is Chief Political Correspondent.

== Reception ==
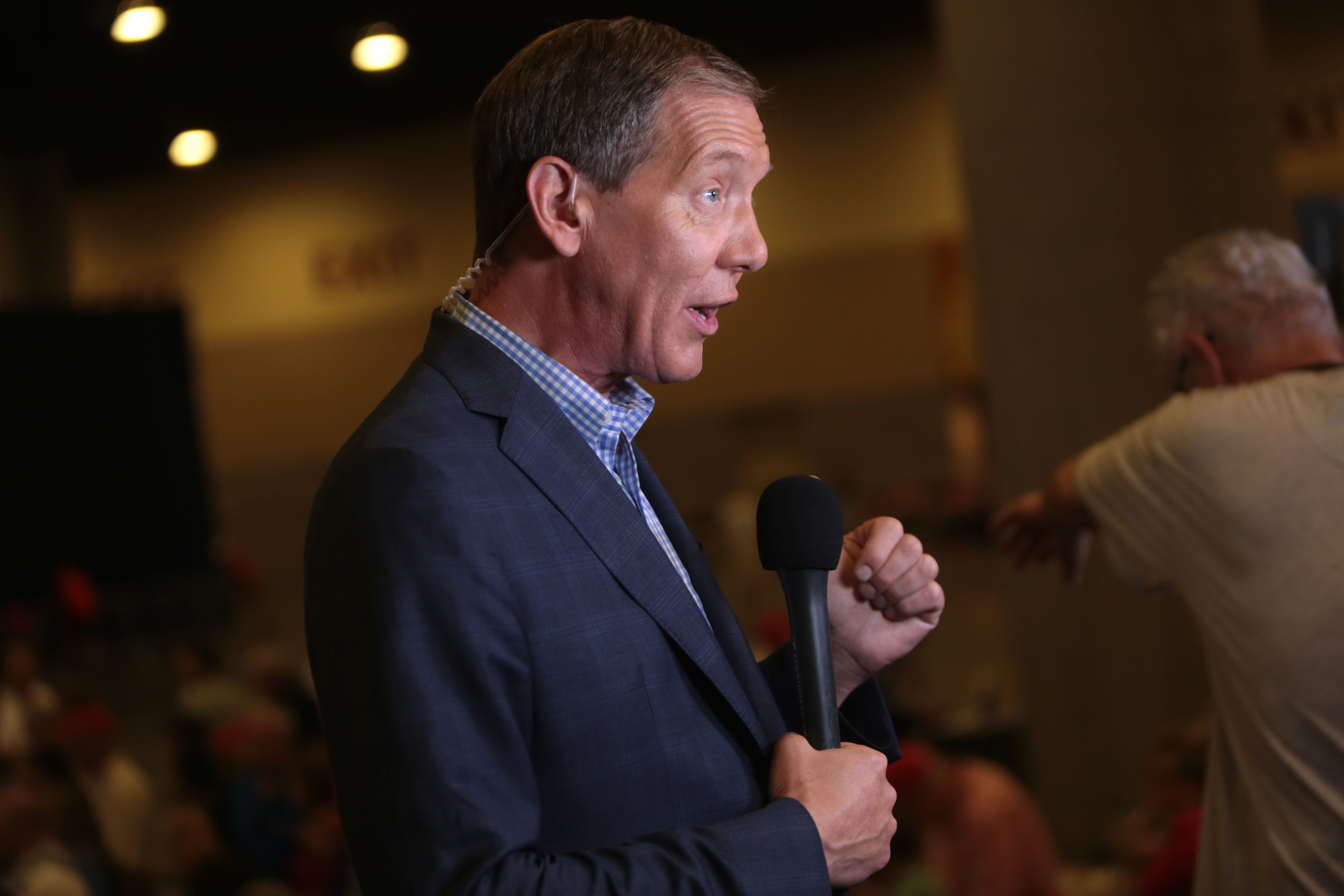
Cameron in August 2016

As a radio reporter in New Hampshire, Cameron was several times named a top reporter by the state Associated Press Broadcasters Association; both The Philadelphia Inquirer and The Washington Post described him as "smart" and "brash". In 2004, Cameron posted a news story on the Fox News website that included fabricated quotes from John Kerry, in which the Senator purportedly called himself a "metrosexual" and Bush a "cowboy". Fox News spokesman Paul Schur later said it was intended to be an internal joke not for publication, and the network apologized for the piece. Cameron was reprimanded.

In June 2009, Washingtonian Magazine named Cameron one of the top 50 journalists in the nation's capital, saying: "[P]layers on both sides of the aisle trust 'Campaign Carl' and know that his reporting is second to none." A 2012 profile in The New York Times described Cameron as a very hard-working journalist often considered "a member of the home team" at Republican campaign events, yet characterized by reporters from rival networks as collegial and unbiased in his reporting. His "less polished" appearance was said to contrast with that of other Fox reporters; NBC News' Chuck Todd, an avowed fan of Cameron, quipped, "[i]t’s nice to see that there are other guys in TV who didn't get there for their looks".

== Personal life ==
Cameron is married to Moira Hopkins, a former technician for Fox News who accompanied him on the campaign trail and now works with him as Executive Producer at Front Page Live.
