= John Saltmarsh (priest) =

English religious radical

John Saltmarsh (born East Riding, Yorkshire, died 1647) was an English religious radical, writer and preacher, described as "one of the most gentle tongued of controversialists". He supported the Covenant and was chaplain in Thomas Fairfax's army. The Dictionary of National Biography describes his theology as "Calvinistic in its base, but improved by practical knowledge of men". William Haller called him "that strange genius, part poet and part whirling dervish". He preached Free Grace theology, and published on the topics of peace, love and unity.

== Life ==
Saltmarsh matriculated Magdalene College, Cambridge in 1627, receiving a B.A. in 1633 and his M.A. in 1636. Having graduated from Cambridge he was ordained deacon at Durham in 1637 and rector of Heslerton c. 1637, where he remained until 1643. Holy discoveries and flames was published in 1640 and is dedicated to Charles I, inspired by the aesthetics of George Herbert. From 1641 Saltmarsh is thought to have begun incorporating notions of Free Grace theology into his sermons.

Departing from Heslerton in 1643, Saltmarsh took parish in Northampton, then Cranbrook in Kent. In July 1643 Saltmarsh heard Royalist churchman Thomas Fuller preach at The Savoy and responded to Fuller's views on ecclesiastical reform by publishing Examinations, or, A discovery of some dangerous positions delivered in A sermon of reformation preached in the church of the Savoy last fast day July 26 by Tho. Fuller, B.D., which Fuller replied to a few months later in August. In the same month Saltmarsh's notions of how conflict could be resolved between King and Parliament were vocally supported in Parliament by Henry Marten with such strength of conviction Marten was evicted from the Commons and imprisoned in the Tower of London. In September Saltmarsh published A peace but no pacification, or, An answer to that new designe of the oath of pacification and accommodation lately printed a subject for all that love true peace and liberty to consider in response to The Oath of Pacification by Henry Parker, Saltmarsh opposing hasty accommodation by Parliament of royalists and the king.

In 1645 Saltmarsh was placed by the parliamentary Committee for Plundered Ministers in Brasted, Kent. Whilst at Brasted Saltmarsh refused his annual stipend, believing tithes unchristian, a matter he would raise in his pamphlet dispute with fellow clergyman John Ley in 1646. During Saltmarsh's time at Brasted lay administration of sacraments and a woman preacher were noted, suggesting Saltmarsh was espousing, or at least facilitating, less than orthodox ideas within his parish.

Thomas Fairfax enlisted Saltmarsh as Army chaplain in the New Model Army from January 1646 and he was kept in pay by the army until November of 1647. There lacks sufficient evidence to gauge the extent of Saltmarsh's influence within the Army but Saltmarsh was certainly recruited for being exceptional, rather than traditional, in his approach. he was assigned no fixed regiment, preaching both to Fairfax personally and his train. Saltmarsh appears to have shared ideological views with William Dell, also a Chaplain in Fairfax's Army; the two clergymen are reported as having preached together on at least one occasion. Saltmarsh's rhetoric is laced with Irenicism and soteriological ideas; he was often accused of antinomianism, though he resolutely denied association with antinomian ideals. Saltmarsh published consistently on Free Grace and "Unitie, Peace, Love" throughout 1646 and 1647. Saltmarsh engaged in popular print discourse with Richard Baxter, Thomas Gataker and Thomas Edwards. Edwards responded to Saltmarsh in his second volume of Gangraena.

During a period of intensified preaching and print propaganda, when political debate entered the public sphere and protestations of correctitude were the norm, often widening the divide rather than bridging it with insight. John Saltmarsh notes the "intemperacy, and unnaturall heats" and begins addressing the division directly, "I saw so many plunged in the controversys of our times, that it had been good some of them were well out, or had never come in, for the disputes which before warmed us, have now set us all on flame". Saltmarsh outlines the importance of "free" and "peaceably bold" discussion, seeing the soul as "more at liberty for debating" than when limitations are placed upon expression. He endeavours not to preach determinate and conclusive ideals, yet not to preach what is popular, instead he relays the openings he is prompted to, from the truth he receives directly via God, "God's own notion".

Immediately after George Joyce seized King Charles I in 1647 Saltmarsh published a "Letter from the Army" defending Fairfax and the Army's actions, he also refuted having become involved in political matters: "I never made state-business any Pulpit work, I never yet preached anything but Christ." Saltmarsh was not present at the Putney Debates in October 1647 but wrote to the Council of War on 28 October exhorting them to righteous conclusion.

On 4 December of the same year Saltmarsh informed his wife, Mary, he had received a vision from God which the must deliver to the Army. He rode from his home in Ilford, Essex, to London, then to army headquarters at Windsor where he spoke both to Cromwell and Fairfax, without removing his hat, where he resigned his position as Army Chaplain, stating he could not honour them due to their imprisoning of the Levellers arrested at Corkbush Field. Saltmarsh conveyed God was angry with them but knew the Army had important work yet to do. Saltmarsh returned home to Laystreet, near Ilford, and died just a few days later, on 11 December 1647. He was buried at Wanstead on December 15th. Mary Saltmarsh posthumously published Englands friend raised from the grave in 1648.

== Views ==
He argued strongly for religious toleration and liberty of conscience. He considered that heaven on earth was possible. Samuel Rutherford accused Saltmarsh of antinomianism. Irenicism is evident throughout Saltmarsh's works. Peter Toon writes

Four of the most popular teachers of doctrinal antinomianism were John Saltmarsh, John Eaton, Tobias Crisp and Robert Lancaster. They explained the free grace of God to the elect in such a way as to neglect the Biblical teaching that a Christian has certain responsibilities to God such as daily humbling for sin, daily prayer, continual trust in God and continual love to men. One of their favourite doctrines was eternal justification, by which they meant that God not only elected the Church to salvation but actually justified the elect before they were born.

He believed in universal salvation, and agreed with John Bunyan on the lack of necessity for baptism. He also regarded observance of Sunday as the Sabbath as not required; his Reasons for Unitie, Peace, and Love (1646) states

Love is more excellent than ordinances

A controversy with Thomas Fuller brought forth his pamphlet Examinations. Fuller

publicly and, for him, pretty sharply rebuked Milton's anonymous tractate Of Reformation ... in England; was in his turn sharply taken to task by a Yorkshire puritan divine, John Saltmarsh; and was actually stopped (i.e. arrested) for a time by the Commons' orders, when proceeding to Oxford with a safe conduct from the Lords.

== Works ==
- Poemata sacra (1636)
- The practice of policie in a Christian life taught from the Scriptures (London: E. G. for Samuel Endarby, 1639)
- Holy Discoveries and Flames (1640)
- Examinations, or, A discovery of some dangerous positions (1643)
- A Peace but No Pacification' (1643)
- A solemn discourse upon the grand covenant, opening the divinity and policy of it (London: Laurence Blaiklock, 1643)
- New Quaeres of conscience, touching the late oath desiring resolution... (Oxford: William Webb, 1643)
- A solemn discourse vpon the sacred league and covenant of both kingdomes, opening the divinity and policy of it (London: Lawrence Blaiklock, 1644)
- A voice from Heaven: or, The words of a dying minister, Mr. Kayes (London: Robert White, 1644)
- The fountaine of free grace opened by questions and answers (London, 1645)
- The opening of Master Prynnes new book, called A vindication: or, light breaking out from a cloud of differences, or late controversies (London: G. Calvert, 1645)
- Some drops of the viall powred out in a season when it is neither night nor day: or, Some discoveries of Jesus Christ his glory in severall books (London, 1645)
- Dawnings of Light (1645)
- The divine right of Presbyterie (London: G. Calvert, 1646)
- An end of one controversie (London: Ruth Raworth, 1646)
- Free grace, or, The flowings of Christs blood free to sinners (London: Giles Calvert, 1646)
- A new quære at this time seasonably to be considered as we tender the advancement of trvth & peace (London: Giles Calvert, 1646)
- Groanes for Liberty (1646)
- Reasons for Unitie, Peace, and Love (1646)
- An End of One Controversie (1646)
- The Smoke in the Temple (1646)
- Some drops of the viall, powered out in a season when it is neither night nor day, or, Some discoveries of Iesus Christ His glory in severall books (London: Giles Calvert, 1646)
- A Letter from the Army (1647)
- Sparkles of Glory (1647)
- The fountaine of free grace opened by questions and answers proving the foundation of faith to consist only in Gods free love, in giving Christ to dye for the sins of all, and objections to the contrary answered by the congregation of Christ in London, constituted by baptisme upon the profession of faith, falsly called Anabaptists (London: Giles Calvert, 1648)
- Englands friend raised from the grave (London: Giles Calvert, 1649)
