= Presumptive regeneration =

Presumptive regeneration (also presupposed regeneration) is the idea often associated with Abraham Kuyper that parents should baptize their children based on a presumption of the child's being regenerate.

The 1905 synod of the Reformed Churches in the Netherlands, meeting in Utrecht (Conclusion of Utrecht), declared:

According to the confession of our churches, the seed of the covenant, by virtue of the promise of God, is to be considered regenerated and sanctified in Christ, until the contrary should become evident from their doctrine and conduct as they grow up.

— Acts, Article 158

These 1905 "Conclusions of Utrecht" were adopted by the Synod of the Christian Reformed Church in North America in 1908. They were challenged from time to time, given an "official interpretation" by the Synod of 1962, and finally set aside in 1968.

Theologians of the Liberated, Free Reformed, and Netherlands Reformed traditions oppose the doctrine. They charge this doctrine with providing parents and especially young adults with a false ground for the assurance of their salvation. Parents begin to regard their children as saved because they were baptized. Young adults begin to regard themselves as regenerate because they were baptized. Pastors begin to assume that everyone in their church is regenerate. Thus very little of the preaching is directed to unconverted persons and often neglects the necessity of repentance.

These theologians would point to a document like the Westminster Larger Catechism as teaching the true ground for one's assurance of their own salvation:

Question 80: Can true believers be infallibly assured that they are in the estate of grace, and that they shall persevere therein unto salvation?
Answer: Such as truly believe in Christ, and endeavor to walk in all good conscience before him, may, without extraordinary revelation, by faith grounded upon the truth of God's promises, and by the Spirit enabling them to discern in themselves those graces to which the promises of life are made, and bearing witness with their spirits that they are the children of God, be infallibly assured that they are in the estate of grace, and shall persevere therein unto salvation.
Question 81: Are all true believers at all times assured of their present being in the estate of grace, and that they shall be saved?
Answer: Assurance of grace and salvation not being of the essence of faith, true believers may wait long before they obtain it; and, after the enjoyment thereof, may have it weakened and intermitted, through manifold distempers, sins, temptations, and desertions; yet are they never left without such a presence and support of the Spirit of God as keeps them from sinking into utter despair.

Some Netherlands Reformed Church theologians might additionally point to a mystical revelation of God to the soul as providing the true ground for one's assurance. Such is their interpretation, for example, of Romans 8:16:

The Spirit himself testifies with our spirit that we are God's children. Now if we are children, then we are heirs – heirs of God and co-heirs with Christ, if indeed we share in his sufferings in order that we may also share in his glory.

The term "regeneration" is also affected by subtle shifts in meaning. John Calvin considered regeneration to represent the activity of New Birth – not its completion. While the current usage of the term looks back on New Birth, early on it meant the process of New Birth itself, that is that God is working in the life of His children. His commentary on John 3 and many of his defenses of infant baptism in the Institutes show this interest not to consider regeneration only as a single event in the believer's life.
