= Daniel Steele =

Methodist theologian

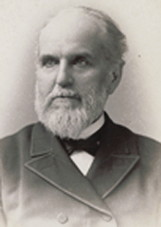
- Born: October 5, 1824; New York City, U.S.
- Died: 2 September 1914 (aged 89)
- Occupations: minister and theologian
- Known for: texts on the Methodist doctrine of entire sanctification

Daniel Steele (5 October 1824—2 September 1914) was a Wesleyan Methodist systematic theologian and minister, who served as a professor of theology at Boston University and the founding president of Syracuse University.

Steele wrote extensively on the Methodist doctrine of entire sanctification and was a leader of the Wesleyan-Holiness movement within the Methodist Episcopal Church. Daniel Steel's books have remained popular in Methodist circles to the present-day. Love Enthroned (1875) was the first of his texts on the topic of holiness.

== Early life and career ==
Daniel Steele was the son of a farmer, being born in rural New York state.

Daniel Steele graduated from Wesleyan University in 1848 with a Bachelor of Arts. Daniel Steele was ordained as a minister in the Methodist Episcopal Church in 1850. From Wesleyan University, he earned a Master of Arts in 1851 and a Doctor of Divinity degree in 1868.

Throughout his life, Daniel Steele served as the pastor of a number of Methodist churches in cities throughout the American state of Massachusetts. In 1884 and 1891, Daniel Steele was a professor of New Testament Greek at Boston University and from 1886 to 1889, Daniel Steele served as a professor of systematic theology; in 1892, he was chair of piratical theology at the same academic institution. Daniel Steele "possesssed a lifelong interest in foreign and home missions, which he gained from his mother, who was the great-niece of the famous missionary to the American Indians David Brainerd."

Daniel Steele criticized what he perceived was the antinomian heresy of the Plymouth Brethren in Substitute For Holiness: Antinomianism Revived.

== Works ==
- Steele, Daniel. Binney's Theological Compendium Improved: Containing a Synopsis of the Evidences, Doctrines, Morals, and Institutions of Christianity. Revised from Amos Binney. New York: Methodist Book Concern, 1875; rev. ed. 1902.
- Steele, Daniel. Love Enthroned: Essays on Evangelical Perfection. New York: Nelson & Phillips, 1875. Revised editions, 1884 and 1908.
- Steele, Daniel. Milestone Papers; or, Experiences of the Holy Spirit in the Life of the Believer. New York: Nelson & Phillips, 1878.
- Steele, Daniel. Half Hours with St. Paul. New York: Hunt & Eaton, 1882.
- Steele, Daniel. Half Hours with St. John’s Epistles. New York: Hunt & Eaton, 1886.
- Steele, Daniel. Antinomianism Revived; or, The Theology of the So-Called Plymouth Brethren Examined and Refuted. Toronto: William Briggs, 1887.
- Steele, Daniel. The Gospel of the Comforter: A Study in the Johannine Writings. New York: Hunt & Eaton, 1890.
- Steele, Daniel. A Defense of Christian Perfection; or, A Critique of Dr. William Pepper's "A Higher Life". New York: Hunt & Eaton, 1896.
- Steele, Daniel. Half Hours with the Greek Testament. New York: Eaton & Mains, 1896.
- Steele, Daniel. Jesus Exultant; or, The Everlasting Priesthood. New York: Eaton & Mains, 1902.
- Steele, Daniel. The Trinity Harmonized in the Perfection and Deity of Christ. New York: Eaton & Mains, 1902.
