= Conclusions of Utrecht =

The Conclusions of the Synod of Utrecht were the result of a 1905 synod of the Reformed Churches in the Netherlands.

The Synod addressed theological questions including justification from eternity, presumptive regeneration/immediate regeneration and Infralapsarian/Supralapsarian; this came after the publication of books by preacher Dr Abraham Kuyper and Herman Bavinck and theses by Professor Lucas Lindeboom. The men disagreed on several issues and there was much debate over these for the many years.

The consistory of the Reformed Church in Hoorn appealed to the 1905 Synod about Lindeboom's main five theses, urging that the RCN put a stop to their teachings, and a committee was put together to look at these. The committee agreed with Lindeboom's views, with some caveats, and the official "Conclusions of the Synod of Utrecht" were adopted.

The Conclusions were updated in 1942 and 1946.

== Official Conclusions ==
- The Synod adopted the infralapsarian presentation of election, but did not condemn the supralapsarian presentation.
- The Synod did not confirm or disprove eternal justification.
- The Synod confirmed both immediate regeneration (especially with regard to children), and the necessity of preaching from the Bible.
- Synod confirmed that the idea that every elect child is regenerated even before baptism cannot be proved from reading the Bible; it stated that every person must both believe in God and be baptized in order to be saved.

== US and Canada ==
The Christian Reformed Church in North America adopted the Conclusions of Synod Utrecht from 1908 to 1968.

In 1968, the CRC Synod stated that the Conclusions would no longer have the status of binding doctrinal deliverances.
