= John Eaton (cricketer) =

English cricketer

Vivian John Eaton (19 June 1902 – 31 December 1972) was an English cricketer active from 1926 to 1946 who played for Sussex. He was born in Steyning and died in Brighton. He appeared in 36 first-class matches as a righthanded batsman and wicketkeeper. He scored 465 runs with a highest score of 44 and claimed 52 catches with 29 stumpings.
