= Antinomianism =

View which rejects laws or legalism

Antinomianism (Ancient Greek: ἀντί [anti] 'against' and νόμος [nomos] 'law') is a term used to describe any view which rejects laws or legalism and argues against moral, religious or social norms (Latin: mores), or is at least considered to do so. The term has both religious and secular meanings.

In some Christian belief systems, an antinomian is one who takes the principle of salvation by faith and divine grace, to the point of asserting that the saved are not bound to follow the moral law contained in the Old Covenant laws.

The distinction between antinomian and other Christian takes on moral law is that antinomians believe that obedience to the law is motivated by an internal principle flowing from belief rather than from any external compulsion, devotion, or need. Antinomianism has been considered to teach that believers have a "license to sin" and that future sins do not require repentance. Johannes Agricola, to whom antinomianism was first attributed, stated that while non-Christians were still held to the Mosaic law, Christians were entirely free from it, being under the gospel alone.

Examples of antinomians being confronted by the religious establishment include Martin Luther's critique of antinomianism, the Ranters of the English Civil War, and the Antinomian Controversy of the seventeenth-century Massachusetts Bay Colony. The charge of antinomianism has been levelled at Presbyterians, Baptists, Congregationalists and some Evangelical churches.

By extension, the word "antinomian" is also used to describe views in religions other than Christianity:

- the 10th century Sufi mystic al-Hallaj was accused of antinomianism.
- the 17th century pseudo-kabbalistic rabbis Sabbatai Zevi and Nathan Benjamin Ashkenazi of Gaza were accused of antinomianism.
- the term is also used to describe certain practices or traditions in Frankism.
- aspects of Vajrayana and Tantra that include sexual rituals are sometimes described as "antinomian" in Buddhism and Hinduism.

== Christian views on antinomianism ==
Antinomianism has been a point of doctrinal contention in the history of Christianity. At its root is an argument between salvation through faith alone and on the basis of good works or works of mercy.

The term antinomianism was coined by Martin Luther during the Reformation to criticize extreme interpretations of the new Lutheran soteriology. In the 18th century, John Wesley, the founder of the Methodist tradition, severely attacked antinomianism.

According to some Christian denominations, moral laws (as opposed to civil or ceremonial laws) are derivative of what St. Paul indirectly refers to as natural law (Romans 2.14–15). According to this point of view, the Mosaic law has authority only insofar as it reflects the commands of Christ and the natural law. Christian sects and theologians who believe that they are less constrained by laws than critics consider customary are often called "antinomian" by those critics. Thus, classic Methodist commentator Adam Clarke held, "The Gospel proclaims liberty from the ceremonial law, but binds you still faster under the moral law. To be freed from the ceremonial law is the Gospel liberty; to pretend freedom from the moral law is Antinomianism."

=== Antinomianism in Gnosticism ===
The term antinomian came into use in the sixteenth century; however, the doctrine itself can be traced in the teaching of earlier beliefs. Early Gnostic sects were accused of failing to follow the Mosaic Law in a manner that suggests the modern term "antinomian". Most Gnostic sects did not accept the Old Testament moral law. For example, the Manichaeans held that their spiritual being was unaffected by the action of matter and regarded carnal sins as being, at worst, forms of bodily disease.

The Old Testament was absolutely rejected by most of the Gnostics. Even the so-called Judaeo-Christian Gnostics (Cerinthus), the Ebionite (Essenian) sect of the Pseudo-Clementine writings (the Elkesaites), take up an inconsistent attitude towards Jewish antiquity and the Old Testament. In this respect, the opposition to Gnosticism led to a reactionary movement. If the growing Christian Church, in quite a different fashion from Paul, laid stress on the literal authority of the Old Testament, interpreted, it is true, allegorically; if it took up a much more friendly and definite attitude towards the Old Testament, and gave a wider scope to the legal conception of religion, this must be in part ascribed to the involuntary reaction upon it of Gnosticism.

Marcion of Sinope was the founder of Marcionism which rejected the Hebrew Bible in its entirety. Marcion considered the God portrayed in the Bible to be a lesser deity, a demiurge, and he claimed that the law of Moses was contrived. (Note: He [Marcion] further maintained that the law of Moses, with its threats and promises of things terrestrial, was a contrivance of the evil principle in order to bind men still more to the earth.) Such deviations from the moral law were criticized by proto-orthodox rivals of the Gnostics, who ascribed various aberrant and licentious acts to them. A biblical example of such criticism can be found in Revelation 2:6–15, which criticizes the Nicolaitans, possibly an early Gnostic sect.

=== Lutheran views ===
The term "antinomianism" was coined by Martin Luther during the Reformation, to criticize extreme interpretations of the new Lutheran soteriology. The Lutheran Church benefited from early antinomian controversies by becoming more precise in distinguishing between law and gospel and justification and sanctification. Martin Luther developed 258 theses during his six antinomian disputations, which continue to provide doctrinal guidance to Lutherans today.

Upon hearing that he was being charged with the rejection of the Old Testament moral law, Luther responded: "And truly, I wonder exceedingly, how it came to be imputed to me, that I should reject the Law or Ten Commandments, there being extant so many of my own expositions (and those of several sorts) upon the Commandments, which also are daily expounded, and used in our churches, to say nothing of the Confession and Apology, and other books of ours." In his "Introduction to Romans", Luther stated that saving faith is

... a living, creative, active and powerful thing, this faith. Faith cannot help doing good works constantly. It doesn't stop to ask if good works ought to be done, but before anyone asks, it already has done them and continues to do them without ceasing. Anyone who does not do good works in this manner is an unbeliever. ... Thus, it is just as impossible to separate faith and works as it is to separate heat and light from fire!

The Lutheran churches teach that God rewards good works done by Christians; the Apology of the Augsburg Confession teaches: "We also affirm what we have often said, that although justification and eternal life go along with faith, nevertheless, good works merit other bodily and spiritual rewards and degrees of reward. According to 1 Corinthians 3:8, 'Each will receive his wages according to his labor.'"

The Lutheran churches label antinomianism as a heresy.

==== First antinomian controversy ====
As early as 1525, Johannes Agricola advanced his idea, in his commentary on Luke, that the law was a futile attempt of God to work the restoration of mankind. He maintained that non-Christians were still held to the Mosaic law, while Christians were entirely free from it, being under the Gospel alone. He viewed sin as a malady or impurity rather than an offense that rendered the sinner guilty and damnable before God. The sinner was the subject of God's pity rather than of his wrath. To Agricola, the purpose of repentance was to abstain from evil rather than the contrition of a guilty conscience. The law had no role in repentance, which came about after one came to faith, and repentance was caused by the knowledge of the love of God alone.

In contrast, Philipp Melanchthon urged that repentance must precede faith and that knowledge of the moral law is needed to produce repentance. He later wrote in the Augsburg Confession that repentance has two parts. "One is contrition, that is, terrors smiting the conscience through the knowledge of sin; the other is faith, which is born of the Gospel, or of absolution, and believes that for Christ's sake, sins are forgiven, comforts the conscience, and delivers it from terrors."

Shortly after Melanchthon drew up the 1527 Articles of Visitation in June, Agricola began to be verbally aggressive toward him, but Martin Luther succeeded in smoothing out the difficulty at Torgau in December 1527. However, Agricola did not change his ideas and later depicted Luther as disagreeing with him. After Agricola moved to Wittenberg, he maintained that the law must be used in the courthouse but it must not be used in the church. He said that repentance comes from hearing the good news only and does not precede but rather follows faith. He continued to disseminate this doctrine in books, despite receiving various warnings from Luther.

Luther, with reluctance, at last, believed that he had to make a public comment against antinomianism and its promoters in 1538 and 1539. Agricola apparently yielded, and Luther's book Against the Antinomians (1539) was to serve as Agricola's recantation. This was the first use of the term 'Antinomian'. But the conflict flared up again, and Agricola sued Luther. He said that Luther had slandered him in his disputations, Against the Antinomians, and in his On the Councils and churches (1539). But before the case could be brought to trial, Agricola left the city, even though he had bound himself to remain at Wittenberg, and moved to Berlin where he had been offered a position as preacher to the court. After his arrival there, he made peace with the Saxons, acknowledged his "error", and gradually conformed his doctrine to that which he had before opposed and assailed. He still used such terms as 'gospel' and 'repentance' in a different manner from Luther.

==== Second antinomian controversy ====
The antinomian doctrine, however, was not eliminated from Lutheranism. Melanchthon and those who agreed with him, called Philippists, were checked by the Gnesio-Lutherans in the Second Antinomian Controversy during the Augsburg Interim. The Philippists ascribed to the Gospel alone the ability to work repentance, to the exclusion of the law. They blurred the distinction between Law and Gospel by considering the Gospel itself to be a moral law. They did not identify Christ's fulfillment of the law with the commandments which humans are expected to follow.

As a result, the Book of Concord rejects antinomianism in the last confession of faith. The Formula of Concord rejects antinomianism in the fifth article, On the Law and the Gospel and in the sixth article, On the Third Use of the Law.

=== Reformed views ===
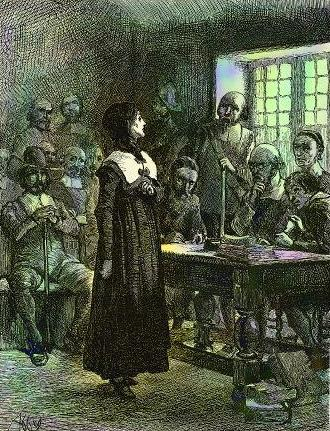
Anne Hutchinson on Trial (1901) by Edwin Austin Abbey depicts the civil trial of Anne Hutchinson during the Antinomian controversy of the Massachusetts Bay Colony on 7 November 1637.

The Thirty-nine Articles of the Church of England (revised and altered by the Westminster Assembly of Divines in 1643) condemn antinomianism, teaching that "no Christian man whatsoever is free from the obedience of the commandments which are called moral. By the moral law, we understand all the Ten Commandments taken to their full extent." The Westminster Confession, held by Presbyterian churches, holds that the moral law contained in the Ten Commandments "does forever bind all, as well justified persons as others, to the obedience thereof". The Westminster Confession of Faith further states: "Faith, thus receiving and resting on Christ and His righteousness, is the alone [sic] instrument of justification; yet it is not alone in the person justified, but is ever accompanied with all other saving graces, and is no dead faith, but works by love."

However, a number of seventeenth-century English writers in the Reformed tradition held antinomian beliefs. None of these individuals argued that Christians should not obey the law. Instead, they believed that believers would spontaneously obey the law without external motivation. Antinomianism during this period is likely a reaction against Arminianism, as it emphasized free grace in salvation to the detriment of any participation on the part of the believer. John Eaton (fl. 1619) is often identified as the father of English antinomianism. Tobias Crisp (1600–1643), a Church of England priest who had been Arminian, was later accused of being an antinomian. He was a divisive figure for English Calvinists, with a serious controversy arising from the republication of his works in the 1690s. Also lesser known was the Anglican priest John Saltmarsh.

From the latter part of the 18th century, critics of Calvinists accused them of antinomianism. Such charges were frequently raised by Arminian Methodists, who subscribed to a synergistic soteriology that contrasted with Calvinism's monergistic doctrine of justification. The controversy between Arminian and Calvinistic Methodists produced the notable Arminian critique of Calvinism: Fletcher's Five Checks to Antinomianism (1771–1775).

=== Methodist views ===
John Wesley, the founder of the Methodist tradition, harshly criticized antinomianism, considering it the "worst of all heresies". He taught that Christian believers are bound to follow the moral law and that they are to partake in the means of grace for their sanctification. Methodists teach the necessity of following the moral law as contained in the Ten Commandments, citing Jesus' teaching, "If ye love me, keep my commandments" (cf. John 14:15).

The Methodist churches consider antinomianism to be a heresy. Methodist systematic theologian Daniel Steele criticized what he perceived was the antinomian heresy of the Plymouth Brethren in Antinomianism Revived: or the Theology of the So-Called Plymouth Brethren Examined and Refuted (1887).

=== Quaker views ===
The Religious Society of Friends were charged with antinomianism due to their rejection of a graduate clergy and a clerical administrative structure, as well as their reliance on the Spirit (as revealed by the Inner Light of God within each person) rather than the Scriptures. They also rejected civil legal authorities and their laws (such as the paying of tithes to the state church and the swearing of oaths) when they were seen as inconsistent with the promptings of the Inner Light of God.

=== Antinomian charges against other groups ===
Other Protestant groups that have been accused of antinomianism include the Anabaptists and Mennonites. The Ranters of 17th century England were one of the most outright antinomian sects in the history of Christianity. New Covenant Theology has been accused of antinomianism for their belief that the Ten Commandments have been abrogated, but they point out that nine of these ten are renewed under the New Covenant's Law of Christ. John Eaton, a leader in the antinomian underground during the 1630s, interpreted Revelation 12:1 with a quote recorded by Giles Firmin: "I saw a Woman Clothed with the Sun" [That is, the Church Clothed with the righteousness of Christ, to her Justification] and the Moon, [that is, Sanctification] under her Feet." Scholars have speculated that the "sun" and "light" may have been code-words used to surreptitiously reveal antinomian sympathies. Sects such as the Ranters and Christian Science were accused of teaching that sin was nonexistent while New England Theology was accused of teaching that sin was beneficial.

=== Biblical law in Christianity ===
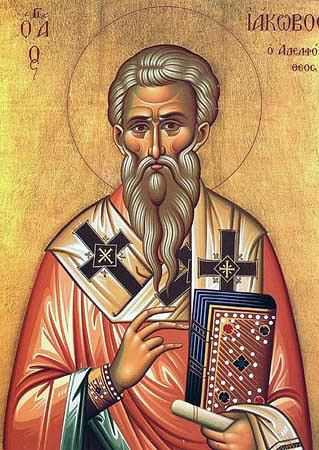
Icon of James the Just, whose judgment was adopted in the Apostolic Decree of Acts 15:19–29, c. 50 AD.

The question of the obligation to follow the Mosaic Law was a point of contention in the Early Christian Church. Many early converts were Greek and thus had less interest in adherence to the Law of Moses than did the earliest Christians, who were primarily Jewish and already accustomed to the Law. Thus, as Christianity spread into new cultures, the early church was pressured by Judaizers and Pharisees to decide which laws were still required of Christians, and which were no longer required under the New Covenant. The New Testament, (especially the book of Acts) is interpreted by some as recording the church slowly abandoning the "ritual laws" of Judaism, such as circumcision, Sabbath and kosher law, while remaining in full agreement on adherence to the "divine law", or Jewish laws on morality, such as the Ten Commandments. Thus, the early Christian church incorporated ideas sometimes seen as partially antinomian or parallel to Dual-covenant theology, while still upholding the traditional laws of moral behavior.

The apostles and elders met at Jerusalem, and after a spirited discussion, their conclusion, later called the Apostolic Decree, possibly a major act of differentiation of the Church from its Jewish roots (the first being the idea that Jesus was the messiah), was recorded in Acts 15:19–21:

Acts 15:(19) Wherefore my [James] sentence is, that we trouble not them, which from among the Gentiles are turned to God: (20) But that we write unto them, that they abstain from pollutions of idols, and from fornication, and from things strangled, and from blood. (21) For Moses of old time hath in every city them that preach him, being read in the synagogues every Sabbath day.

— KJV

Beginning with Augustine of Hippo, many have seen a connection to Noahide Law, while some modern scholars reject the connection to Noahide Law and instead see Leviticus 17–18 as the basis.

James sets out a preliminary list of commands which Gentiles should obey. Gentiles were not required to be circumcised but were required to obey the four beginning requirements to be part of the larger congregation. This passage shows that the remainder of the commandments would follow as they studied "Moses" in the Synagogues. If Gentiles did not follow this reduced requirement, they risked being put out of the Synagogue and missing out on a Torah education (in Leviticus 17 and 20). James's list still includes some dietary commands, but many of those also passed out of some Christian traditions quite early. Acts 10:9–16 describes the following vision, which was used to excuse early gentile Christians from the Mosaic dietary laws.

(9) ... Peter went up upon the housetop to pray about the sixth hour: And he became very hungry, and would have eaten: but while they made ready, he fell into a trance, And saw heaven opened, and a certain vessel descending unto him, as it had been a great sheet knit at the four corners, and let down to the earth: Wherein were all manner of fourfooted beasts of the earth, and wild beasts, and creeping things, and fowls of the air. And there came a voice to him, Rise, Peter; kill, and eat. But Peter said, Not so, Lord; for I have never eaten anything that is common or unclean. And the voice spake unto him again the second time, What God hath cleansed, that call not thou common. This was done thrice: and the vessel was received up again into heaven.

— KJV

Peter was perplexed about the vision in Acts 10. His subsequent explanation of the vision in Acts 11 gives no credence to antinomianism as it relates to the admission of Gentiles into covenant relationship with God.

Though the Apostolic Decree is no longer observed by many Christian denominations today, it is still observed in full by the Greek Orthodox. (Note: K. J. von Hefele notes: We further see that, at the time of the Synod of Gangra, the rule of the Apostolic Synod with regard to blood and things strangled was still in force. With the Greeks, indeed, it continued always in force as their Euchologies still show. Balsamon also, the well-known commentator on the canons of the Middle Ages, in his commentary on the sixty-third Apostolic Canon, expressly blames the Latins because they had ceased to observe this command. What the Latin Church, however, thought on this subject about the year 400, is shown by St. Augustine in his work Contra Faustum, where he states that the Apostles had given this command in order to unite the heathens and Jews in the one ark of Noah; but that then, when the barrier between Jewish and heathen converts had fallen, this command concerning things strangled and blood had lost its meaning, and was only observed by few. But still, as late as the eighth century, Pope Gregory the Third (731) forbade the eating of blood or things strangled under threat of a penance of forty days. No one will pretend that the disciplinary enactments of any council, even though it be one of the undisputed Ecumenical Synods, can be of greater and more unchanging force than the decree of that first council, held by the Holy Apostles at Jerusalem, and the fact that its decree has been obsolete for centuries in the West is proof that even Ecumenical canons may be of only temporary utility and may be repealed by disuse, like other laws.) The Ethiopian Orthodox Tewahedo Church also preserves many Judaic customs.

In the Letter to the Hebrews (Hebrews 7:11–28), it is written that under the Old Testament Law, priests had to be from the tribe of Levi, Aaron, and his sons:

Bring his sons and dress them in tunics and put headbands on them. Then tie sashes on Aaron and his sons. The priesthood is theirs by a lasting ordinance. In this way you shall ordain Aaron and his sons.

— Exodus 29:8–9

It is pointed out that Jesus was from the tribe of Judah, and thus Jesus could not be a priest under the Old Testament Law, as Jesus is not a descendant of Aaron. It states that the Law had to change for Jesus to be the High Priest: "For when there is a change of the priesthood, there must also be a change of the law." (Hebrews 7:12)

==== Supporting Pauline passages ====
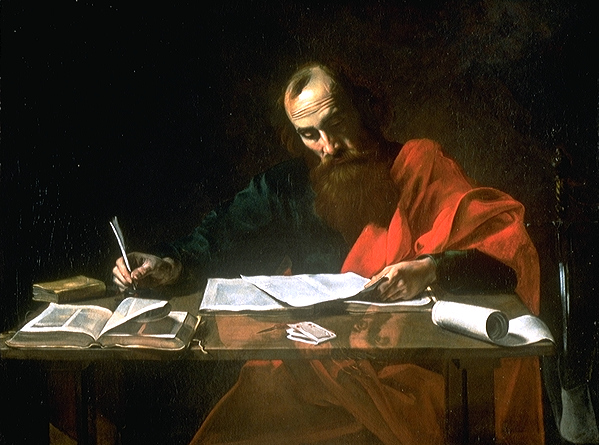
Saint Paul Writing His Epistles, 16th century (Blaffer Foundation Collection, Houston, Texas). Most scholars think Paul dictated his letters to a secretary.

The Apostle Paul, in his Letters, says that believers are saved by the unearned grace of God, not by good works, "lest anyone should boast", and placed a priority on orthodoxy (right belief) before orthopraxy (right practice). The soteriology of Paul's statements in this matter has long been a matter of dispute. In modern Protestant orthodoxy, this passage is interpreted as a reference to justification by trusting Christ.

Paul used the term freedom in Christ, for example, Galatians 2:4. Some understood this to mean "lawlessness" (i.e. not obeying Mosaic Law). For example, in Acts 18:12–16, Paul is accused of "persuading ... people to worship God in ways contrary to the law".

In Acts 21, James the Just explained his situation to Paul:

but they have been informed about you that you teach all the Jews who are among the Gentiles to forsake Moses, saying that they ought not to circumcise their children nor to walk according to the customs.

— Acts 21:21, New King James Version

Colossians 2:13–14 is sometimes presented as proof of Paul's antinomistic views. For example, the NIV translates these verses: "... he forgave us all our sins, having canceled the written code, with its regulations, that was against us and that stood opposed to us; he took it away, nailing it to the cross." But, the NRSV translates this same verse as: "... he forgave us all our trespasses, erasing the record that stood against us with its legal demands. He set this aside, nailing it to the cross." This latter translation makes it sound as though it is a record of trespasses, rather than the Law itself, that was "nailed to the cross". The interpretation partly depends on the original Greek word χειρόγραφον which, according to Strong's G5498, literally means "something written by hand"; it is variously translated as "the bond" (RSV, NAB), "written code" (NIV), or "record" (ESV, NRSV, CEB), as in a record of debt.

In 2 Corinthians 3, Paul writes,

who also made us sufficient as ministers of the new covenant, not of the letter but of the Spirit; for the letter kills, but the Spirit gives life. But if the ministry of death, written and engraved on stones, was glorious, so that the children of Israel could not look steadily at the face of Moses because of the glory of his countenance, which glory was passing away, how will the ministry of the Spirit not be more glorious? For if the ministry of condemnation had glory, the ministry of righteousness exceeds much more in glory. For even what was made glorious had no glory in this respect, because of the glory that excels. For if what is passing away was glorious, what remains is much more glorious. Therefore, since we have such hope, we use great boldness of speech—unlike Moses, who put a veil over his face so that the children of Israel could not look steadily at the end of what was passing away. But their minds were blinded. For until this day the same veil remains unlifted in the reading of the Old Testament, because the veil is taken away in Christ. But even to this day, when Moses is read, a veil lies on their heart. Nevertheless when one turns to the Lord, the veil is taken away. Now the Lord is the Spirit; and where the Spirit of the Lord is, there is liberty.

— 2 Corinthians 3:6–17, New King James Version

Some cite Acts 13:39: "And by him all that believe are justified from all things, from which ye could not be justified by the law of Moses." Romans 6 states twice that believers are not under the law: Romans 6:14, "For sin shall not have dominion over you: for ye are not under the law, but under grace", and Romans 6:15, "What then? shall we sin, because we are not under the law, but under grace? God forbid" (KJV).

In Galatians 3, Paul describes the Galatians as "foolish" for relying on being observant to the Law:

O foolish Galatians! Who has bewitched you that you should not obey the truth, before whose eyes Jesus Christ was clearly portrayed among you as crucified? This only I want to learn from you: Did you receive the Spirit by the works of the law, or by the hearing of faith? Are you so foolish? Having begun in the Spirit, are you now being made perfect by the flesh? Have you suffered so many things in vain—if indeed it was in vain? Therefore He who supplies the Spirit to you and works miracles among you, does He do it by the works of the law, or by the hearing of faith?

— Galatians 3:1–5, New King James Version

He goes on to say that the purpose of the Law was to lead people to Christ, so once people believe in Christ, they are no longer under the Law:

But before faith came, we were kept under guard by the law, kept for the faith which would afterward be revealed. Therefore the law was our tutor to bring us to Christ, that we might be justified by faith. But after faith has come, we are no longer under a tutor.

— Galatians 3:23–25, New King James Version

In Galatians 4:21–31, Paul compares the Old Covenant with the New Covenant. In this comparison, he equates each covenant with a woman, using the wives of Abraham as examples. The old covenant is equated with the slave woman, Hagar, and the new covenant is equated with the free woman Sarah (Galatians 4:22–26). He concludes this example by saying that we are not children of the slave woman, but children of the free woman. In other words, we are not under the old covenant, we are under the new covenant.

For it is written that Abraham had two sons: the one by a bondwoman, the other by a freewoman. But he who was of the bondwoman was born according to the flesh, and he of the freewoman through promise, which things are symbolic. For these are the two covenants: the one from Mount Sinai which gives birth to bondage, which is Hagar—for this Hagar is Mount Sinai in Arabia, and corresponds to Jerusalem which now is, and is in bondage with her children—but the Jerusalem above is free, which is the mother of us all.

— Galatians 4:22–26, New King James Version

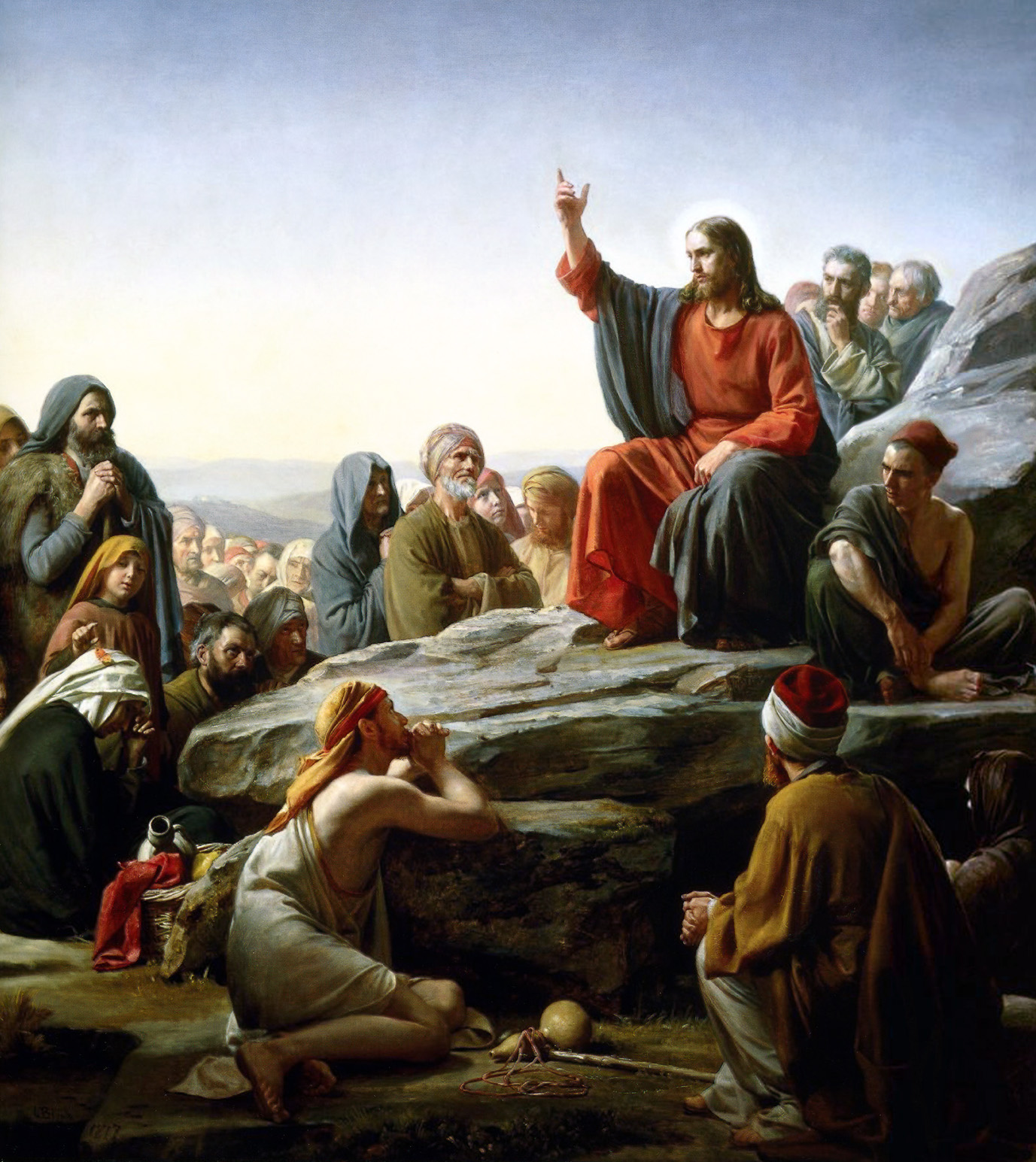
Christians believe that Jesus is the mediator of the New Covenant in Hebrews 8:6. Depicted is his Sermon on the Mount in which he commented on the Law.

Romans 10:4 is sometimes translated: "For Christ is the end of the law for righteousness to every one that believeth" (KJV), or "Christ is the end of the law so that there may be righteousness for everyone who believes" (NRSV). The key word here is τέλος telos (Strong's G5056). Robert Badenas argues that telos is correctly translated as 'goal', not 'end', so that Christ is the goal of the Law. N. T. Wright in his New Testament for Everyone translates this verse as: "The Messiah, you see, is the goal of the law, so that covenant membership may be available for all who believe." Andy Gaus' version of the New Testament translates this verse as: "Christ is what the law aims at: for every believer to be on the right side of [God's] justice."

Also cited is Ephesians 2:15: "He has abolished the law with its commandments and ordinances, that he might create in himself one new humanity in place of the two, thus making peace", NRSV. Another passage cited is Romans 7:1–7, especially Romans 7:4 "Wherefore, my brethren, ye also are become dead to the law by the body of Christ; that ye should be married to another, even to him who is raised from the dead, that we should bring forth fruit unto God"; and Romans 7:6 "But now we are delivered from the law, that being dead wherein we were held; that we should serve in newness of spirit, and not in the oldness of the letter" (KJV).

The first covenant (made with Israel, as recorded in the Old Testament) is compared with the new covenant in Hebrews 8–9. In Hebrews 8:6–7: "But the ministry Jesus has received is as superior to theirs as the covenant of which he is mediator is superior to the old one, and it is founded on better promises. For if there had been nothing wrong with that first covenant, no place would have been sought for another." It goes on to say that the problem with the first covenant was with the people who were supposed to keep it and that in the new covenant: "I will put my laws into their minds, and write them on their hearts, and I will be their God, and they shall be my people" (Hebrews 8:10).

The first covenant was said to be obsolete, and would soon disappear: "By calling this covenant 'new', he has made the first one obsolete; and what is obsolete and aging will soon disappear" (Hebrews 8:13). It identifies the first covenant which is disappearing in Hebrews 9:1–5. Particularly the "stone tablets of the covenant" in Hebrews 9:4 referred directly to the Ten Commandments.

Then indeed, even the first covenant had ordinances of divine service and the earthly sanctuary. For a tabernacle was prepared: the first part, in which was the lampstand, the table, and the showbread, which is called the sanctuary; and behind the second veil, the part of the tabernacle which is called the Holiest of All, which had the golden censer and the Ark of the Covenant overlaid on all sides with gold, in which were the golden pot that had the manna, Aaron's rod that budded, and the tablets of the covenant; and above it were the cherubim of glory overshadowing the mercy seat.

— Hebrews 9:1–5, New King James Version

However, the notion that the Ten Commandments have been abrogated, as found in New Covenant Theology, is challenged by some.

Some scholars consider Jesus' Sermon on the Mount (particularly the Antitheses) to be an antitype of the proclamation of the Ten Commandments or Mosaic Covenant by Moses from the Biblical Mount Sinai.

==== Opposing Pauline passages ====
Those who oppose antinomianism invoke Paul as upholding obedience to the law:

- "Because the carnal mind is enmity against God: for it is not subject to the law of God, neither indeed can be. So then they that are in the flesh cannot please God." Romans 8:7–8 KJV
- "But if any provide not for his own, and specially for those of his own house, he hath denied the faith, and is worse than an infidel." 1 Timothy 5:8 KJV
- "But now I have written unto you not to keep company, if any man that is called a brother be a fornicator, or covetous, or an idolater, or a railer, or a drunkard, or an extortioner; with such an one no not to eat." 1 Corinthians 5:11 KJV
- "Children, obey your parents in the Lord: for this is right. Honour thy father and mother; which is the first commandment with promise; ..." Ephesians 6:1–2 KJV
- "Do we then make void the law through faith? God forbid: yea, we establish the law." Romans 3:31 KJV
- "For as many as have sinned without law shall also perish without law: and as many as have sinned in the law shall be judged by the law; For not the hearers of the law are just before God, but the doers of the law shall be justified." Romans 2:12–13 KJV
- "For this ye know, that no whoremonger, nor unclean person, nor covetous man, who is an idolater, hath any inheritance in the kingdom of Christ and of God. Let no man deceive you with vain words: for because of these things cometh the wrath of God upon the children of disobedience." Ephesians 5:5–6 KJV
- "Know ye not that the unrighteous shall not inherit the kingdom of God? Be not deceived: neither fornicators, nor idolaters, nor adulterers, nor effeminate, nor abusers of themselves with mankind, Nor thieves, nor covetous, nor drunkards, nor revilers, nor extortioners, shall inherit the kingdom of God." 1 Corinthians 6:9–10:26 KJV
- "Let your women keep silence in the churches: for it is not permitted unto them to speak; but they are commanded to be under obedience, as also saith the law." 1 Corinthians 14:34 KJV
- "Mortify therefore your members which are upon the earth; fornication, uncleanness, inordinate affection, evil concupiscence, and covetousness, which is idolatry." Colossians 3:5 KJV
- "Neither be ye idolaters, as were some of them; as it is written, The people sat down to eat and drink, and rose up to play." 1 Corinthians 10:7 KJV
- "Now the works of the flesh are manifest, which are these; Adultery, fornication, uncleanness, lasciviousness, Idolatry, witchcraft, hatred, variance, emulations, wrath, strife, seditions, heresies, Envyings, murders, drunkenness, revellings, and such like: of the which I tell you before, as I have also told you in time past, that they which do such things shall not inherit the kingdom of God." Galatians 5:19–21 KJV
- "Say I these things as a man? or saith not the law the same also? For it is written in the law of Moses, Thou shalt not muzzle the mouth of the ox that treadeth out the corn. Doth God take care for oxen?" 1 Corinthians 9:8–9 KJV
- "The wife is bound by the law as long as her husband liveth; but if her husband be dead, she is at liberty to be married to whom she will; only in the Lord." 1 Corinthians 7:39 KJV
- "Wherefore, my dearly beloved, flee from idolatry." 1 Corinthians 10:14 KJV
- "While he answered for himself, Neither against the law of the Jews, neither against the temple, nor yet against Cæsar, have I offended any thing at all." Acts 25:8 KJV

==== Theology ====
The Catholic Encyclopedia (1910) article on the Judaizers notes:

Paul, on the other hand, not only did not object to the observance of the Mosaic Law, as long as it did not interfere with the liberty of the Gentiles, but he conformed to its prescriptions when occasion required (1 Corinthians 9:20). Thus he shortly after the Council of Jerusalem circumcised Timothy (Acts 16:1–3), and he was in the very act of observing the Mosaic ritual when he was arrested at Jerusalem (21:26 sqq.).

The Jewish Encyclopedia article "Gentile: Gentiles May Not Be Taught the Torah" notes the following reconciliation:

R. Emden, in a remarkable apology for Christianity contained in his appendix to "Seder 'Olam", gives it as his opinion that the original intention of Jesus, and especially of Paul, was to convert only the Gentiles to the seven moral laws of Noah and to let the Jews follow the Mosaic law – this explains the apparent contradictions in the New Testament regarding the laws of Moses and the Sabbath.

The Tübingen school of historians founded by F. C. Baur holds that in Early Christianity, there was a conflict between Pauline Christianity and the Jerusalem Church led by James the Just, Simon Peter, and John the Apostle, the so-called "Jewish Christians" or "Pillars of the Church". In many places Paul writes that he was an observant Jew and that Christians should "uphold the Law" (Romans 3:31). In Galatians 2:14, part of the Incident at Antioch, Paul publicly accused Peter of judaizing. Even so, he says sins remain sins and upholds by several examples the kind of behaviour that the church should not tolerate (e.g., Galatians 5:19–21, 1 Cor 6:9–10). In 1 Corinthians 7:10–16 he cites Jesus' teaching on divorce ("not I but the Lord") and does not reject it, but goes on to proclaim his own teaching ("I, not the Lord"), an extended counsel regarding a specific situation which some interpret as conforming to what the Lord said. But this may mean he received direct knowledge of what the Lord wanted him to teach through the Holy Ghost (Galatians 2:6–10).

==== Paul versus James ====
The Epistle of James, in contrast, states that we are to obey the Law of God and that "a person is justified by works and not by faith alone" (James 2:14–26). Historically, this statement has been difficult for Protestants to reconcile with their belief in justification by faith alone as it appears to contradict Paul's teaching that works do not justify (Romans 4:1–8). Martin Luther, believing that his doctrines were refuted by James's conclusion that works also justify, suggested that the Epistle might be a forgery, and relegated it to an appendix in his Bible. Literature which discusses this includes the article on James 2:20 in Law and Gospel, Romans 2:6, Ephesians 2:8–10, and Joint Declaration on the Doctrine of Justification.

James also wrote: "For whoever keeps the whole law and yet stumbles at just one point is guilty of breaking all of it. For he who said, 'Do not commit adultery', also said, 'Do not murder'. If you do not commit adultery but do commit murder, you have become a lawbreaker." (James 2:10–11) One interpretation is that people who want to keep the Old Testament Law must perfectly keep all of the Law—"an impossible task". James appeals to his readers to follow the "Royal Law of Love" instead of in the preceding verses (James 2:8–9). But the scholar Alister McGrath says that James was the leader of a Judaizing party that taught that Gentiles must obey the entire Mosaic Law.

Paul made a statement that appears to agree with James, saying that "both" faith produced as a result of repentance (the initial requirement for justification) "and" works (the evidence or proof of true faith) must exist together:

So then, King Agrippa, I was not disobedient to the vision from heaven. First to those in Damascus, then to those in Jerusalem and in all Judea, and to the Gentiles also, I preached that they should repent and turn to God and prove their repentance by their deeds.

— Acts 26:19–20 (NIV)

==== Jesus ====
The Torah prescribes the death penalty for desecrating the Sabbath by working (Exodus 31:14–17). To avoid any possibility of breaking the simple and few original Torah commands, the Pharisees formulated and added several thousand strict laws and numerous traditions which they treated as laws. According to the Christians, Jesus criticized the Pharisees for adding to the law (Mark 7:7–9). The Jewish Encyclopedia article on Jesus notes:

Jesus, however, does not appear to have taken into account the fact that the Halakah was at this period just becoming crystallized, and that much variation existed as to its definite form; the disputes of Bet Hillel and Bet Shammai were occurring about the time of his maturity.

In the Gospel of Mark, Jesus' disciples were picking grain for food on the Sabbath (Mark 2:23–28). This was against one of the Pharisaic laws that had been added to the original Torah law which prohibited work on the Sabbath day. When the Pharisees challenged Jesus over breaking their law, he pointed to Biblical precedent and declared that "the Sabbath was made for man, not man for the Sabbath". Some claim Jesus rejected complete adherence to the Torah. Most scholars hold that Jesus did not reject the law, but directed that it should be obeyed in context. E. P. Sanders notes, "No substantial conflict existed between Jesus and the Pharisees with regard to Sabbath, food, and purity laws. ... The church took some while to come to the position that the Sabbath need not be kept, and it is hard to think that Jesus explicitly said so." There may be passages where the words of Jesus have been misinterpreted and were not really in contradiction with the Jewish law. Jesus never once broke the Torah, yet he did denounce the added Pharisaic rules and openly defied the Pharisees.

In the Gospel of Matthew, Jesus is sometimes said to refer to wicked people with the term ergazomenoi tēn anomian (ἐργαζόμενοι τὴν ἀνομἰαν)—e.g., Matthew 7:21–23, Matthew 13:40–43. Due to this negative context, the term has almost always been translated as "evildoers", although it literally means "workers of lawlessness". In Hebrew, lawlessness would imply "Torahlessness". Matthew appears to present Jesus as equating wickedness with encouraging antinomianism. Scholars view Matthew as having been written by or for a Jewish audience, the so-called Jewish Christians. Several scholars argue that Matthew artificially lessened a claimed rejection of Jewish law so as not to alienate his intended audience. But Jesus called for full adherence to the commandments (Matthew 5:19–21). He declared: "Do not think that I have come to abolish the Law or the Prophets; I have not come to abolish them but to fulfill them" (Matthew 5:17). A parallel verse to Matthew 7:21 is James 1:22.

1 John 3:4 states: "Everyone who commits sin is guilty of lawlessness; sin is lawlessness."

== Islamic antinomianism ==
In Islam, the law – which applies not only to religion, but also to areas such as politics, banking, and sexuality – is called sharīʿah (شريعة), and traditionally draws from four primary sources:

1. the Quran, which is Islam's central religious text;
2. the Sunnah, which refers to actions practised during the time of the prophet Muḥammad, and is often thought to include the ḥadīth, or recorded words and deeds of Muḥammad;
3. Ijmāʿ, which is the consensus of the ʿulamāʾ, or class of Islamic scholars, on points of practice;
4. Qiyās, which – in Sunnī Islam – is a kind of analogical reasoning conducted by the ʿulamāʾ upon specific laws that have arisen through appeal to the first three sources; in Shia Islam, ʿaql ("reason") is used in place of qiyās.

Actions, behavior, or beliefs that are considered to violate any or all of these four sources – primarily in matters of religion – can be termed "antinomian". Depending on the action, behavior, or belief in question, a number of different terms can be used to convey the sense of "antinomian": shirk ("association of another being with God"); bidʻah ("innovation"); kufr ("disbelief"); ḥarām ("forbidden", a more generic term); etc.

As an example, the 10th century Sufi mystic al-Hallaj was executed for shirk for, among other things, his statement ana al-Ḥaqq (أنا الحق), meaning "I am the Truth". As الحق al-Ḥaqq ("the Truth") is one of the names of God in Islam, this would imply he was saying: "I am God." Expressions like these are known as šaṭḥiyyāt. Another individual who has often been termed antinomian is Ibn Arabi, a 12th and 13th-century scholar and mystic whose doctrine of waḥdat al-wujūd ("unity of being") has sometimes been interpreted as being pantheistic, and thus shirk.

Apart from individuals, entire groups of Muslims have also been called antinomian. One of these groups is the Nizārī Ismāʿīlī Shīʿa, who have always had strong millenarian tendencies arising partly from persecution directed at them by Sunnīs. Influenced to a certain extent by Gnosticism, the Ismāʿīlīs developed a number of beliefs and practices – such as their belief in the imamate and an esoteric exegesis of the Qurʾān – that orthodox Sunnī Muslims considered to be shirk and, hence, to be seen as antinomian. Certain other groups that evolved out of Shīʿah belief, such as the Alawites and the Bektashi Order, have also been considered antinomian. The Bektashis, particularly, have practices that diverge from conventional Islamic practice, such as the consumption of alcoholic beverages, the non-wearing of the ḥijāb ("veil") by women, and gathering in the cemevi in preference to the mosque.

== Hindu antinomianism ==
The Aghori engage in post-mortem and strongly antinomian practices. They often dwell in charnel grounds and cremation grounds, cover or smear their bodies with cremation ashes, and use human remains, including bones, to make jewellery and kapāla, or skull cups, of the kind Shiva and other Hindu deities are often iconographically depicted holding or using. Their antinomian practices include consuming ordure and human corpse-flesh. They practice this post-mortem cannibalism by eating flesh from foraged corpses, including bodies obtained from cremation ghats. Some Aghori also consume an intoxicating drink of bhaṅga.

== Nonreligious antinomianism ==
George Orwell was a frequent user of "antinomian" in a secular (and always approving) sense. In his 1940 essay on Henry Miller, "Inside the Whale", the word appears several times, including one in which he calls A. E. Housman a writer in "a blasphemous, antinomian, 'cynical' strain", meaning defiant of arbitrary societal rules.

The psychologist Nathan Adler defined the "antinomian personality type" as "manifested by one whose frame of reference is threatened or has been disrupted. He suffers from a breakdown in the balance of his control and release mechanisms and from the permeability of his body boundaries."

In his study of late-20th-century western society, The Age of Extremes, the historian Eric Hobsbawm used the term in a sociological sense.

== See also ==
- Abrogation of Old Covenant laws
- Antinomian controversy - 1630s Massachusetts
- Christian anarchism
- Christian liberty
- Christian–Jewish reconciliation
- Christian universalism
- Covenant (biblical)
- Do what thou wilt
- Frankism
- Free Grace theology
- Heterodoxy
- Historical reliability of the Acts of the Apostles
- Legalism (theology)
- Libertine
- Minuth
- Montanism
- Relativism (moral relativism)
- Neonomianism
- Sovereign citizen movement
- Supersessionism

== Sources ==
- Badenas, Robert. Christ the End of the Law, Romans 10.4 in Pauline Perspective. Sheffield (UK): JSOT Press, 1985 ISBN 0-905774-93-0 argues that telos is correctly translated as goal, not end, so that Christ is the goal of the Law, end of the law would be antinomianism.
- Bar-Asher, Me'ir Mikha'el and Kofsky, Aryeh. The Nuṣayrī-ʿAlawī Religion: An Enquiry into its Theology and Liturgy. Leiden: Koninklijke Brill NV, 2002. ISBN 90-04-12552-3.
- Chittick, William C. The Sufi Path of Knowledge: Ibn Al-Arabi's Metaphysics of Imagination. Albany: State University of New York Press, 1989. ISBN 0-88706-885-5.
- Clarence-Smith, W.G. Islam and the Abolition of Slavery. London: C. Hurst & Co. (Publishers) Ltd, 2006. ISBN 1-85065-708-4.
- Daftary, Farhad; ed. Mediaeval Ismaʿili History and Thought. Cambridge: Cambridge University Press, 1996. ISBN 0-521-45140-X.
- Dunn, James D.G. Jesus, Paul and the Law 1990 ISBN 0-664-25095-5
- Encyclopaedia of the Orient. "Isma'ilism Archived 2 January 2017 at the Wayback Machine". Retrieved 10 October 2006.
- Freedman, David Noel, editor. (1998). Anchor Bible Dictionary, article on Antinomianism by Hall, Robert W., ISBN 0-385-19351-3
- G. Kawerau, in A. Hauck's Realencyklopadie (1896)
- J. C. L. Gieseler, Ch. Hist. (New York ed. 1868, vol. iv.)
- J. H. Blunt Dict. of Doct. and Hist. Theol. (1872)
- Luther, Martin. Only the Decalogue Is Eternal: Martin Luther's Complete Antinomian Theses and Disputations. Minneapolis: Lutheran Press, 2008. ISBN 978-0-9748529-6-6
- Peter Linebaugh and Marcus Rediker. The Many-Headed Hydra. Beacon Press, Boston, 2000
- Pratt, Douglas. The Challenge of Islam: Encounters in Interfaith Dialogue. Aldershot, Hampshire: Ashgate Publishing Limited, 2005. ISBN 0-7546-5122-3.
- Riess, in I. Goschler's Dict. Encyclop. de la théol. cath. (1858)
- Schimmel, Annemarie. Mystical Dimensions of Islam. ISBN 0-8078-1271-4.
- Weir, Anthony. "Differences Between Bektashism and Islamic Orthodoxy" in The Bektashi Order of Dervishes Archived 28 July 2005 at the Wayback Machine. Retrieved 10 October 2006.
