= John Eaton (divine) =

English cleric

John Eaton (1575–1641) was an English divine and Antinomian. Along with Tobias Crisp, Eaton is considered one of the most important Antinomians of the 17th century. He is the author of The Honeycombe of Free Justificaiton.

== Early life ==
Eaton, born in Kent in or about 1575, was educated at Trinity College, Oxford, where he became the first recipient of the newly founded Blount exhibition in 1590. He proceeded B.A. 16 February 1595, and M.A. 7 July 1603. After serving several curacies, including that of St. Catherine, Coleman Street, London, he was presented about 1604 to the vicarage of Wickham Market, Suffolk, where he continued for fifteen years, 'being accounted by all the neighbouring ministers a grand Antinomian, if not one of the founders of the sect so called'.

== Mid-life ==
Eaton, though undoubtedly much of a fanatic, made an excellent vicar; 'in a few years the parish was generally reformed: insomuch that most children of twelve years old were able to give a good account of their knowledge in the grounds of religion'. At length his heterodox preaching gave offence to his diocesan, and he was deprived of his living 29 April 1619, as being 'an incorrigible divulger of errors and false opinions'. He persisted, however, in promulgating his doctrine, for which, as he says, he suffered 'much hurry' and 'divers imprisonments'. He bore his persecution with equanimity.

== Death ==
The time of his death is uncertain. Anthony a Wood, whose knowledge of his latter days was evidently founded on a misreading of the title-pages and prefaces of his works, erroneously states that Eaton, having been instituted 'in 1625 or thereabouts,’ continued vicar of Wickham Market until his death in '1641,’ and 'was there buried,’ and he has been followed by all subsequent writers. Strype, in citing portions of an undated letter from John Echard, vicar of Darsham, Suffolk, in 1616, in which mention is made of Eaton and the court of high commission, absurdly refers it to 1575.

== Writings ==
None of Eaton's writings were permitted to be published in his lifetime. After his death there appeared:

1. 'The Discovery of the most dangerous dead Faith,’ 12mo, London, 1641 (a second impression with an addition. of "Abraham's Steps of Faith" and "The True Treasure of the Heart",’ was issued, 12mo, London, 1642; a third edition in William Cudworth's tracts entitled 'Christ alone Exalted,’ 8vo, London, 1747).
2. 'The Honey-Combe of Free Justification by Christ alone. Collected out of the meere Authorities of Scripture, and common and unanimous Consent of the faithful Interpreters and Dispensers of God's Mysteries upon the same, especially as they expresse the Excellency of Free Justification,’ 4to, London, 1642, edited by Robert Lancaster, who in his 'Advertisement to the Reader' promised to publish at some future time a life of Eaton, but failed to do so. Brook says that Eaton 'committed some mistakes in his assertions about the doctrines of grace.'
