= List of Latin phrases (S) =

This page is one of a series listing English translations of notable Latin phrases, such as veni, vidi, vici and et cetera. Some of the phrases are themselves translations of Greek phrases, as ancient Greek rhetoric and literature started centuries before the beginning of Latin literature in ancient Rome.

Latin	Translation	Notes
saltus in demonstrando	leap in explaining	a leap in logic, by which a necessary part of an equation is omitted.
salus in arduis	a stronghold (or refuge) in difficulties	a Roman Silver Age maxim. Also the school motto of Wellingborough School.
salus populi suprema lex esto	the welfare of the people is to be the highest law	From Cicero's De Legibus, book III, part III, sub. VIII. Quoted by John Locke in his Second Treatise, On Civil Government, to describe the proper organization of government. Also the state motto of Missouri.
salva veritate	with truth intact	Refers to two expressions that can be interchanged without changing the truth value of the statements in which they occur.
Salvator Mundi	savior of the world	Christian epithet referring to Jesus; subject of iconography depicting Christ, e.g. Salvator Mundi by Leonardo da Vinci.
salvo errore et omissione (s.e.e.o.)	save for error and omission	Used as a reservation on statements of financial accounts. Often now given in English "errors and omissions excluded" or "e&oe".
salvo honoris titulo (SHT)	save for title of honor	Addressing oneself to someone whose title is unknown.
Sancta Sedes	Holy Chair	literally, "holy seat". Refers to the Papacy or the Holy See.
sancta simplicitas	holy innocence	Or "sacred simplicity".
sancte et sapienter	in a holy and wise way	Also sancte sapienter (holiness, wisdom), motto of several institutions, notably King's College London
sanctum sanctorum	Holy of Holies	referring to a more sacred and/or guarded place, within a lesser guarded, yet also holy location.
sapere aude	dare to know	From Horace's Epistularum liber primus, Epistle II, line 40. Made popular in Kant's essay Answering the Question: What Is Enlightenment? defining the Age of Enlightenment. The phrase is common usage as a university motto.
sapiens dominabitur astris	the wise man will master the stars	Astrological aphorism and motto of the Ukrainian Main Directorate of Intelligence.
sapiens qui prospicit	wise is he who looks ahead	Motto of Malvern College, England
sapienti sat	enough for the wise	From Plautus. Indicates that something can be understood without any need for explanation, as long as the listener has enough wisdom or common sense. Often extended to dictum sapienti sat est ("enough has been said for the wise", commonly translated as "a word to the wise is enough").
sapientia et doctrina	wisdom and learning	Motto of Fordham University, New York; of Hill House School Doncaster, England
sapientia et eloquentia	wisdom and eloquence	One of the mottos of the Ateneo schools in the Philippines
sapientia et veritas	wisdom and truth	Motto of Christchurch Girls' High School, New Zealand
sapientia et virtus	wisdom and virtue	Motto of the University of Hong Kong, Hong Kong
sapientia ianua vitae	wisdom is the gateway to life	Motto of the Wirral Grammar School for Boys, Bebington, England
sapientia melior auro	wisdom is better than gold	Motto of University of Deusto, Bilbao, San Sebastián, Spain
sapientia, pax, fraternitas	Wisdom, Peace, Fraternity	Motto of Universidad de las Américas, Puebla, Cholula, Mexico
scientia pennae	On Wings of Knowledge	Motto of Mombasa Academy, Mombasa, Kenya
sapientia potentia est	wisdom is power	Motto of the House of Akeleye, Sweden, Denmark, Czechoslovakia
sat celeriter fieri quidquid fiat satis bene	That which has been done well has been done quickly enough	One of the two favorite maxims of Augustus. The other is "festina lente" ("hurry slowly", i. e., if you want to go fast, go slow).
satius est impunitum relinqui facinus nocentis (quam innocentem damnari) (Note: Also as a transcription error latius est)	It is better to let the crime of the guilty go unpunished (than to condemn the innocent)	
scientia ac labore	By/from/with knowledge and labour	Motto of several institutions
scientia aere perennius	knowledge, more lasting than bronze	unknown origin, probably adapted from Horace's ode III (Exegi monumentum aere perennius).
scientia cum religione	religion and knowledge united	Motto of St Vincent's College, Potts Point
scientiae cedit mare	The sea yields to knowledge	Motto of the United States Coast Guard Academy.
scientia dux vitae certissimus	Science is the truest guide in life	Motto of the Middle East Technical University.
Scientiae et patriae	For science and fatherland	Motto of University of Latvia
scientia et labor	knowledge and work	motto of Universidad Nacional de Ingeniería
scientia et sapientia	knowledge and wisdom	motto of Illinois Wesleyan University
scientia imperii decus et tutamen	knowledge is the adornment and protection of the Empire	Motto of Imperial College London
scientia ipsa potentia est	knowledge itself is power	Stated originally by Sir Francis Bacon in Meditationes Sacrae (1597), which in modern times is often paraphrased as scientia est potestas or scientia potentia est (knowledge is power).
scientia, labor, libertas	science, labour, liberty	Motto of the Free University of Tbilisi.
scientia non olet	knowledge doesn't smell	A variation on Emperor Vespasian's pecunia non olet in Suetonius' De vita Caesarum. Used to say the way in which we learn something doesn't matter as long as it is knowledge acquired.
scientia vincere tenebras	conquering darkness by science	Motto of several institutions, such as the Brussels Free Universities (Université Libre de Bruxelles and Vrije Universiteit Brussel).
scilicet (sc. or ss.)	it is permitted to know	that is to say; to wit; namely; in a legal caption, it provides a statement of venue or refers to a location.
scio	I know	
scio me nihil scire	I know that I know nothing	
scire quod sciendum	knowledge which is worth having	motto of now defunct publisher Small, Maynard & Company
scribimus indocti doctique poemata passim	Each desperate blockhead dares to write	as translated by Philip Francis. From Horace, Epistularum liber secundus (1, 117) and quoted in Fielding's Tom Jones; lit: "Learned or not, we shall write poems without distinction."
scuto amoris divini	by the shield of God's love	The motto of Skidmore College
sectamini caritatem	pursue love	From 1 Corinthians 14:1, motto of the Roman Catholic Diocese of Motherwell
seculo seculorum	forever and ever	
secundum quid et simpliciter	[what is true] according to something, [is true] absolutely	"unqualified generalization" in Aristotle's Sophistical Refutations
sed ipse spiritus postulat pro nobis, gemitibus inenarrabilibus	But the same Spirit intercedes incessantly for us, with inexpressible groans	Romans 8:26
sed terrae graviora manent	But on earth, worse things await	Virgil, Aeneid 6:84.
sede vacante	with the seat being vacant	The "seat" refers to the Holy See; the vacancy refers to the interregnum between two popes.
sedes apostolica	apostolic chair	Synonymous with Sancta Sedes.
sedes incertae	seat (i.e. location) uncertain	Used in biological classification to indicate that there is no agreement as to which higher order grouping a taxon should be placed into. Abbreviated sed. incert.
sedet, aeternumque sedebit	sit, be seated forever	from Virgil's Aeneid 6:617: when you stop trying, then you lose
semel in anno licet insanire	once in a year one is allowed to go crazy	Concept expressed by various authors, such as Seneca, Saint Augustine and Horace. It became proverbial during the Middle Ages.
semper ad meliora	always towards better things	Motto of several institutions
semper anticus	always forward	Motto of the 45th Infantry Division (United States) and its successor, the 45th Infantry Brigade Combat Team (United States)
semper apertus	always open	Motto of University of Heidelberg
semper ardens	always burning	Motto of Carl Jacobsen and name of a line of beers by Danish brewery Carlsberg.
semper eadem	ever the same	personal motto of Elizabeth I, appears above her royal coat of arms. Used as motto of Elizabeth College, Guernsey, Channel Islands, which was founded by Elizabeth I, and of Ipswich School, to whom Elizabeth granted a royal charter. Also the motto of the City of Leicester and Prince George's County.
semper excelsius	always higher	Motto of the K.A.V. Lovania Leuven and the House of Wrigley-Pimley-McKerr
semper fidelis	always faithful	Motto of several institutions, e.g. United States Marine Corps
semper fortis	always brave	Unofficial motto of the United States Navy
semper idem	always the same	Motto of Underberg
semper in excretia sumus solim profundum variat	We're always in the manure; only the depth varies.	Lord de Ramsey, House of Lords, 21 January 1998
semper instans	always threatening	Motto of 846 NAS Royal Navy
semper invicta	always invincible	Motto of Warsaw
semper liber	always free	Motto of the city of Victoria, British Columbia
semper libertas	always freedom	Motto of Prince George County, Virginia
semper maior	always more, always greater	Motto of Ignatius of Loyola, founder of the Jesuits (Society of Jesus)
semper necessitas probandi incumbit ei qui agit	the necessity of proof always lies with the person who lays charges	Latin maxim often associated with the burden of proof in law or in philosophy
semper paratus	always prepared	Motto of several institutions, e.g. United States Coast Guard; see also nunquam non paratus (never unprepared)
semper primus	always first	Motto of several US military units
semper progrediens	always progressing	Motto of the island of Sint Maarten, of King City Secondary School in King City, Ontario, Canada and of Fairfax High School (Fairfax, Virginia)
semper reformanda	always in need of being reformed	A phrase deriving from the Nadere Reformatie movement in the seventeenth century Dutch Reformed Church and widely but informally used in Reformed and Presbyterian churches today. It refers to the conviction of certain Reformed Protestant theologians that the church must continually re-examine itself in order to maintain its purity of doctrine and practice. The term first appeared in print in Jodocus van Lodenstein, Beschouwinge van Zion (Contemplation of Zion), Amsterdam, 1674.
semper supra	always above	Motto of the United States Space Force
semper sursum	always aim high	Motto of several institutions
semper vigilans	always vigilant	Motto of several institutions including the Civil Air Patrol of the United States Air Force, the city of San Diego, California
semper vigilo	always vigilant	Motto of the Scottish Police Forces, Scotland
Senatus Populusque Romanus (SPQR)	The Senate and the People of Rome	The official name of the Roman Republic. "SPQR" was carried on battle standards by the Roman legions. In addition to being an ancient Roman motto, it remains the motto of the modern city of Rome.
sensu lato	with the broad, or general, meaning	Less literally, "in the wide sense".
sensu stricto cf. stricto sensu	"with the tight meaning"	Less literally, "in the strict sense".
sensus plenior	in the fuller meaning	In biblical exegesis, the deeper meaning intended by God, not intended by the human author.
sequere pecuniam	follow the money	In an effort to understand why things may be happening contrary to expectations, or even in alignment with them, this idiom suggests that keeping track of where money is going may show the basis for the observed behavior. Similar in spirit to the phrase cui bono (who gains?) or cui prodest (who advances?), but outside those phrases' historically legal context.
Sermo Tuus Veritas Est	Thy Word Is Truth	motto of the General Theological Seminary, Cornelius Fontem Esua
sero venientes male sedentes	those who are late are poorly seated	
sero venientibus ossa	those who are late get bones	
servabo fidem	Keeper of the faith	I will keep the faith.
serviam	I will serve	The answer of St. Michael the Archangel to the non serviam, "I will not serve" of Satan, when the angels were tested by God on whether they will serve an inferior being, a man, Jesus, as their Lord.
servus servorum Dei	servant of the servants of God	A title for the Pope.
sesquipedalia verba	words a foot and a half long	From Horace's Ars Poetica, "proicit ampullas et sesquipedalia verba" ("he throws down his high-flown language and his foot-and-a-half-long words"). A self-referential jab at long words and needlessly elaborate language in general.
Si comprehendis [,] non est Deus	if you understand [something], it is not God	Augustine of Hippo, Sermo 117.3.5; PL 38, 663
si dormiam capiar	If I sleep, I may be caught	Motto of HMS Wakeful (H88)
Si monumentum requiris circumspice	If you seek (his) monument, look around you	from the epitaph on Christopher Wren's tomb in St Paul's Cathedral.
Si non oscillas, noli tintinnare	If you can't swing, don't ring	Inscribed on a plaque above the front door of the Playboy mansion in Chicago.
si omnes... ego non	if all ones... not I	
si peccasse negamus fallimur et nulla est in nobis veritas	if we deny having made a mistake, we are deceived, and there's no truth in us	From Christopher Marlowe's The Tragical History of Doctor Faustus, where the phrase is translated "if we say that we have no sin, we deceive ourselves, and there's no truth in us." (cf. 1 John 1:8 in the New Testament)
si quaeris peninsulam amoenam circumspice	if you seek a delightful peninsula, look around	Said to have been based on the tribute to architect Christopher Wren in St Paul's Cathedral, London: si monumentum requiris, circumspice (see above). State motto of Michigan, adopted in 1835; the spelling of 'peninsulam' is used in the motto, although the correct ancient spelling is 'paeninsulam'.
si quid novisti rectius istis, candidus imperti; si nil, his utere mecum.	if you can better these principles, tell me; if not, join me in following them	Horace, Epistles I :6, 67–68
si tacuisses, philosophus mansisses	If you had kept your silence, you would have stayed a philosopher	This quote is often attributed to the Latin philosopher Boethius of the late fifth and early sixth centuries. It translates literally as, "If you had been silent, you would have remained a philosopher." The phrase illustrates a common use of the subjunctive verb mood.
si vales valeo (SVV)	if you are well, I am well (abbr)	A common beginning for ancient Roman letters. An abbreviation of si vales bene est ego valeo, alternatively written as SVBEEV. The practice fell out of fashion and into obscurity with the decline in Latin literacy.
si vis amari ama	If you want to be loved, love	This is often attributed to the Roman philosopher Seneca, found in the sixth of his letters to Lucilius.
si vis pacem, para bellum	if you want peace, prepare for war	From Publius Flavius Vegetius Renatus, De Re Militari. Origin of the name parabellum for some ammunition and firearms, such as the Luger Parabellum. (Similar to igitur qui desiderat pacem, praeparet bellum and in pace ut sapiens aptarit idonea bello.)
sic	thus	Or "just so". States that the preceding quoted material appears exactly that way in the source, despite any errors of spelling, grammar, usage, or fact that may be present. Used only for previous quoted text; ita or similar must be used to mean "thus" when referring to something about to be stated.
sic currite ut comprehendatis	Run to win	More specifically, So run, that ye may obtain, 1 Corinthians 24. Motto of Divine Word University, Madang, Papua New Guinea.
sic et non	thus and not	More simply, "yes and no".
sic gorgiamus allos subjectatos nunc	we gladly feast on those who would subdue us	Mock-Latin motto of The Addams Family.
sic infit	so it begins	
sic itur ad astra	thus you shall go to the stars	From Virgil, Aeneid book IX, line 641. Possibly the source of the ad astra phrases. Motto of several institutions, including the Royal Canadian Air Force.
sic parvis magna	greatness from small beginnings	Motto of Sir Francis Drake
sic passim	Thus here and there	Used when referencing books; see passim.
sic semper erat, et sic semper erit	Thus has it always been, and thus shall it ever be	
sic semper tyrannis	thus always to tyrants	Attributed to Brutus at the time of Julius Caesar's assassination and to John Wilkes Booth at the time of Abraham Lincoln's assassination; whether it was actually said at either of these events is disputed. State motto of Virginia, adopted in 1776.
sic transit gloria mundi	thus passes the glory of the world	A reminder that all things are fleeting. During Papal coronations, a monk reminds the Pope of his mortality by saying this phrase, preceded by pater sancte ("holy father") while holding before his eyes a burning paper illustrating the passing nature of earthly glories. This is similar to the tradition of a slave in a Roman triumphs whispering memento mori in the ear of the celebrant.
sic utere tuo ut alienum non laedas	use [what is] yours so as not to harm [what is] of others	Or "use your property in such a way that you do not damage others'". A legal maxim related to property ownership laws, often shortened to simply sic utere ("use it thus").
sic vita est	thus is life	Or "such is life". Indicates that a circumstance, whether good or bad, is an inherent aspect of living.
sic vos non vobis mellificates apes	Thus you not for yourselves make honey, bees.	Part of a verse written by Virgil after the poet Bathyllus plagiarized his work.
sidere mens eadem mutato	Though the constellations change, the mind is universal	Latin motto of the University of Sydney.
signetur (sig or S/)	let it be labeled	Medical shorthand
signum fidei	Sign of the Faith	Motto of the Institute of the Brothers of the Christian Schools.
silentium est aureum	silence is golden	Latinization of the English expression "silence is golden". Also Latinized as silentium est aurum ("silence is gold").
similia similibus curantur similia similibus curentur	similar things are taken care of by similar things let similar things be taken care of by similar things	"like is cured by like" and "let like be cured by like"; the first form ("curantur") is indicative, while the second form ("curentur") is subjunctive. The indicative form is found in Paracelsus (16th century), while the subjunctive form is said by Samuel Hahnemann, founder of homeopathy, and is known as the law of similars.
similia similibus solvuntur	similar substances will dissolve similar substances	Used as a general rule in chemistry; "like dissolves like" refers to the ability of polar or non polar solvents to dissolve polar or non polar solutes respectively.
simplex sigillum veri	simplicity is the sign of truth	expresses a sentiment akin to Keep It Simple, Stupid
sincere et constanter	sincere and constant	Motto of the Order of the Red Eagle
sine anno (s.a.)	without a year	Used in bibliographies to indicate that the date of publication of a document is unknown.
sine die	without a day	Originally from old common law texts, where it indicates that a final, dispositive order has been made in the case. In modern legal context, it means there is nothing left for the court to do, so no date for further proceedings is set, resulting in an "adjournment sine die".
Sine Cerere et Baccho friget Venus	without Ceres and Bacchus, Venus remains cold	without food and (alcoholic) drink, love will not ensue; from Terence's comedy Eunuchus (161 BC)
sine ira et studio	without anger and fondness	Thus, impartially. From Tacitus, Annals 1.1.
sine honoris titulo	without honorary title	Addressing oneself to someone whose title is unknown.
sine labore non erit panis in ore	without labour there will be no bread in mouth	
sine loco (s.l.)	without a place	Used in bibliographies to indicate that the place of publication of a document is unknown.
sine metu	"without fear"	Motto of Jameson Irish Whiskey
sine nomine (s.n.)	"without a name"	Used in bibliographies to indicate that the publisher of a document is unknown.
sine poena nulla lex	Without penalty, there is no law	Refers to the ineffectiveness of a law without the means of enforcement
sine prole	Without offspring	Frequently abbreviated to "s.p." or "d.s.p." (decessit sine prole – "died without offspring") in genealogical works.
sine prole superstite	Without surviving children	Without surviving offspring (even in abstract terms)
sine timore aut favore	Without Fear or Favor	St.George's School, Vancouver, British Columbia, Canada motto
sine qua non	without which not	Used to denote something that is an essential part of the whole. See also condicio sine qua non.
sine remediis medicina debilis est	without remedies medicine is powerless	Inscription on a stained glass in the conference hall of a pharmaceutical mill in Kaunas, Lithuania.
sine scientia ars nihil est	without knowledge, skill is nothing	Motto of The International Diving Society and of the Oxford Medical Students' Society.
sisto activitatem	I cease the activity	Phrase, used to cease the activities of the Sejm upon the liberum veto principle
sit nomen Domini benedictum	blessed be the name of the Lord	Phrase used in a pontifical blessing imparted by a Catholic bishop
sit nomine digna	may it be worthy of the name	National motto of Rhodesia, also motto of Durbanville, South Africa
sit pax in valle tamesis	Let there be peace in the Thames Valley	Motto of Thames Valley Police, English territorial police force for Berkshire, Buckinghamshire and Oxfordshire.
sit sine labe decus	let honour stainless be	Motto of the Brisbane Boys' College (Brisbane, Australia).
sit tibi terra levis	may the earth be light to you	Commonly used on gravestones, often contracted as S.T.T.L., the same way as today's R.I.P.
sit venia verbo	may there be forgiveness for the word	Similar to the English idiom "pardon my French".
Socratici viri	"Socrates' men" or "Disciples of Socrates"	Coined by Cicero to refer to any who owe philosophical reasoning and method to Socrates.
sol iustitiae illustra nos	sun of justice, shine upon us	Motto of Utrecht University.
sol lucet omnibus	the sun shines on everyone	Petronius, Satyricon Lybri 100.
sol omnia regit	the sun rules over everything	Inscription near the entrance to Frombork Museum
sola fide	by faith alone	The material principle of the Protestant Reformation and one of the five solas, referring to the Protestant claim that the Bible teaches that men are saved by faith even without works.
sola dosis facit venenum	the dose makes the poison	It is credited to Paracelsus who expressed the classic toxicology maxim "All things are poison and nothing is without poison; only the dose makes a thing not a poison."
sola gratia	by grace alone	A motto of the Protestant Reformation and one of the five solas, referring to the Protestant claim that salvation is an unearned gift (cf. ex gratia), not a direct result of merit.
sola lingua bona est lingua mortua	the only good language is a dead language	Example of dog Latin humor.
sola scriptura	by scripture alone	The formal principle of the Protestant Reformation and one of the five solas, referring to the Protestant idea that the Bible alone is the ultimate authority, not the Pope or tradition.
sola nobilitat virtus	virtue alone ennobles	Similar to virtus sola nobilitas
solamen miseris socios habuisse doloris	misery loves company	From Christopher Marlowe's The Tragical History of Doctor Faustus.
soli Deo gloria (S.D.G.)	glory to God alone	A motto of the Protestant Reformation and one of the five solas, referring to the idea that God is the creator of all good things and deserves all the praise for them. Johann Sebastian Bach often signed his manuscripts with the abbreviation S.D.G. to invoke this phrase, as well as with AMDG (ad maiorem Dei gloriam). The motto of the MasterWorks Festival, an annual Christian performing arts festival.
solus Christus	Christ alone	A motto of the Protestant Reformation and one of the five solas, referring to the Protestant claim that the Bible teaches that Jesus is the only mediator between God and mankind. Also rendered solo Christo ("by Christ alone").
solus ipse	I alone	
solvitur ambulando	it is solved by walking	The problem is solved by taking a walk, or by simple experiment.
sortes biblicae	biblical lots	method of divination where by the Bible is opened randomly and the first words which one sees or points to are interpreted as predictive
Spartam nactus es; hanc exorna	your lot is cast in Sparta, be a credit to it	from Euripides's Telephus, Agamemnon to Menelaus.
specialia generalibus derogant	special departs from general	
species nova	new species	Used in biological taxonomy
spectemur agendo	let us be judged by our acts	Motto of Hawthorn Football Club
Speculum Dinae	Diana's Mirror	Lake Nemi as referred to by poets and painters
speculum speculorum	mirror of mirrors	
spem gregis	the hope of the flock	from Virgil's Eclogues
spem reduxit	he has restored hope	Motto of New Brunswick.
spero meliora	I aspire to greater things	Also translated "I expect better" and "I hope for better things."
spes bona	good hope	Motto of University of Cape Town.
spes vincit thronum	hope conquers (overcomes) the throne	Refers to Revelation 3:21, "To him that overcometh will I grant to sit with me in my throne, even as I also overcame, and am set down with my Father in his throne." On the John Winthrop family tombstone, Boston, Massachusetts.
spiritus mundi	spirit of the world	From The Second Coming (poem) by William Butler Yeats. Refers to Yeats' belief that each human mind is linked to a single vast intelligence, and that this intelligence causes certain universal symbols to appear in individual minds. The idea is similar to Carl Jung's concept of the collective unconscious.
spiritus ubi vult spirat	the spirit spreads wherever it wants	Refers to The Gospel of Saint John 3:8, where he mentions how Jesus told Nicodemus "The wind blows wherever it wants, and even though you can hear its noise, you don't know where it comes from or where it goes. The same thing happens to whomever has been born of the Spirit." It is the motto of Cayetano Heredia University
splendor sine occasu	brightness without setting	Loosely "splendour without diminishment" or "magnificence without ruin". Motto of British Columbia and of Boise State University.
stamus contra malo	we stand against by evil	The motto of the Jungle Patrol in The Phantom. The phrase actually violates Latin grammar because of a mistranslation from English, as the preposition contra takes the accusative case. The correct Latin rendering of "we stand against evil" would be "stamus contra malum".
stante pede	with a standing foot	"Immediately".
stare decisis	to stand by the decided things	To uphold previous rulings, recognize precedent.
Stat crux dum volvitur orbis	The Cross is steady while the world turns	Motto of the Carthusian Order.
stat rosa pristina nomine, nomina nuda tenemus	the rose of old remains only in its name; we hold only empty names	An epigraph quoted at the end of Umberto Eco's The Name of the Rose. A verse by Bernard of Cluny (although likely mistranscribed in medieval times from an original stat Roma pristina nomine..., "primordial Rome remains only in its name...").
stat sua cuique dies	There is a day [turn] for everybody	Virgil, Aeneid, X 467
statim (stat)	"immediately"	Medical shorthand used following an urgent request.
statio bene fide carinis	A safe harbour for ships	Motto of Cork City, Ireland. Adapted from Virgil's Aeneid (II, 23: statio male fida carinis, "an unsafe harbour") but corrupted for unknown reasons to "fide".
status aparte	separate state	The special status of Aruba between 1986 and 2010 as a constituent country within the Kingdom of the Netherlands, separate from the Netherlands Antilles to which it belonged until 1986.
status quaestionis	the state of investigation	most commonly employed in scholarly literature to refer in a summary way to the accumulated results, scholarly consensus, and areas remaining to be developed on any given topic.
status quo	the state in which	The current condition or situation.
status quo ante	the state in which [things were] before	For other uses, see Status Quo Ante (disambiguation). The state of affairs prior to some upsetting event.
status quo ante bellum	the state before the war	A common term in peace treaties.
stet	let it stand	Marginal mark in proofreading to indicate that something previously deleted or marked for deletion should be retained.
stet fortuna domus	let the fortune of the house stand	First part of the motto of Harrow School, England, and inscribed upon Ricketts House, at the California Institute of Technology.
stipendium peccati mors est	the reward of sin is death	From Christopher Marlowe's The Tragical History of Doctor Faustus. (See Rom 6:23, "For the wages of sin is death, but the free gift of God is eternal life in Christ Jesus our Lord.")
strenuis ardua cedunt	the heights yield to endeavour	Motto of the University of Southampton.
stricto sensu cf. sensu stricto	with the tight meaning	Less literally, "in the strict sense".
stupor mundi	the wonder of the world	A title given to Frederick II, Holy Roman Emperor. More literally translated "the bewilderment of the world", or, in its original, pre-Medieval sense, "the stupidity of the world".
sua sponte	by its own accord	Legal term when a court takes up a motion on its own initiative, not because any of the parties to the case has made the motion. The regimental motto of the 75th Ranger Regiment of the U.S. Army.
suaviter in modo, fortiter in re	gently in manner, resolutely in execution	Motto of Essendon Football Club
sub anno	under the year	Commonly abbreviated s.a., it is used to cite events recorded in chronicles according to the year under which they are listed. For example, "ASC MS A, s.a. 855" means the entry for the year 855 in manuscript A of the Anglo-Saxon Chronicle.
sub cruce lumen	The Light Under the Cross	Motto of the University of Adelaide, Australia. Refers to the figurative "light of learning" and the Southern Cross constellation, Crux.
sub divo	under the wide open sky	Also, "under the sky", "in the open air", "out in the open" or "outdoors". Ablative "divo" does not distinguish divus, divi, a god, from divum, divi, the sky.
sub finem	toward the end	Used in citations to refer to the end of a book, page, etc., and abbreviated 's.f.' Used after the page number or title. E.g., 'p. 20 s.f. '
sub Iove frigido	under cold Jupiter	At night; from Horace's Odes 1.1:25
sub judice	under a judge	Said of a case that cannot be publicly discussed until it is finished. Also sub iudice.
sub poena	under penalty	Source of the English noun subpoena. Said of a request, usually by a court, that must be complied with on pain of punishment. Examples include sub poena duces tecum ("take with you under penalty"), a court summons to appear and produce tangible evidence, and sub poena ad testificandum ("under penalty to testify"), a summons to appear and give oral testimony.
sub rosa	under the rose	"In secret", "privately", "confidentially", or "covertly". In the Middle Ages, a rose was suspended from the ceiling of a council chamber to indicate that what was said in the "under the rose" was not to be repeated outside. This practice originates in Greek mythology, where Aphrodite gave a rose to her son Eros, and he, in turn, gave it to Harpocrates, the god of silence, to ensure that his mother's indiscretions—or those of the gods in general, in other accounts—were kept under wraps.
sub nomine (sub nom.)	under the name	"in the name of", "under the title of"; used in legal citations to indicate the name under which the litigation continued.
sub silentio	under silence	implied but not expressly stated.
sub specie aeternitatis	under the sight of eternity	Thus, "from eternity's point of view". From Spinoza, Ethics.
sub specie Dei	under the sight of God	"from God's point of view or perspective".
sub tuum praesidium	Beneath thy compassion	Name of the oldest extant hymn to the Theotokos (Blessed Virgin Mary). Also "under your protection". A popular school motto.
Sub umbra floreo	Under the shade I flourish	National Motto of Belize, referring to the shade of the mahogany tree.
sub verbo; sub voce		Under the word or heading; abbreviated s.v. Used to cite a work, such as a dictionary, with alphabetically arranged entries, e.g. "Oxford English Dictionary, s.v. 'horse.'""
sublimis ab unda	Raised from the waves	Motto of King Edward VII and Queen Mary School, Lytham
subsiste sermonem statim	stop speaking immediately	
Succisa virescit	Cut down, we grow back stronger	Motto of Delbarton School
Sudetia non cantat	One doesn't sing on the Sudeten Mountains	Saying from Hanakia
sui generis	Of its own kind	In a class of its own; of a unique kind. E.g. "The City of London is a sui generis entity, with ancient rights that differ from all other jurisdictions in the United Kingdom."
sui iuris	Of one's own right	Capable of responsibility. Has both legal and ecclesiastical use. Commonly rendered sui juris.
sum quod eris	I am what you will be	A gravestone inscription to remind the reader of the inevitability of death (cf. memento mori). Also rendered fui quod sis ("I have been what you are") and tu fui ego eris ("I have been you, you will be I").
sum quod sum	I am what I am	from Augustine's Sermon No. 76.
summa cum laude	with highest praise	
summa potestas	sum or totality of power	It refers to the final authority of power in government. For example, power of the Sovereign.
summa summarum	all in all	Literally "sum of sums". When a short conclusion is rounded up at the end of some elaboration.
summum bonum	the supreme good	Literally "highest good". Also summum malum ("the supreme evil").
summum ius, summa iniuria	supreme law, supreme injustice	From Cicero (De officiis, I, 10, 33). An acritical application of law, without understanding and respect of laws's purposes and without considering the overall circumstances, is often a means of supreme injustice. A similar sentence appears in Terence (Heautontimorumenos, IV, 5): Ius summum saepe summa est malitia ("supreme justice is often out of supreme malice (or wickedness)").
sumptibus auctoris	published [cost of printing paid] by author	Found in self-published academic books of the 17th to 19th century. Often preceded by Latin name of city in which the work is published.
sunt lacrimae rerum	there are tears for things	From Virgil, Aeneid. Followed by et mentem mortalia tangunt ("and mortal things touch my mind"). Aeneas cries as he sees Carthaginian temple murals depicting the deaths of the Trojan War. See also hinc illae lacrimae.
sunt omnes unum	they are all one	
sunt pueri pueri, pueri puerilia tractant	Children are children, and children do childish things	anonymous proverb
sunt superis sua iura	the gods have their own laws	From Ovid's Metamorphoses, book IX, line 500; also used by David Hume in The Natural History of Religion, chapter XIII
suo jure	in one's own right	Used in the context of titles of nobility, for instance where a wife may hold a title in her own right rather than through her marriage.
suo motu	upon one's own initiative	Also rendered suo moto. Usually used when a court of law, upon its own initiative, (i.e., no petition has been filed) proceeds against a person or authority that it deems has committed an illegal act. It is used chiefly in South Asia.
suos cultores scientia coronat	Knowledge crowns those who seek her	The motto of Syracuse University, New York.
super firmum fundamentum dei	On the firm foundation of God	The motto of Ursinus College, Pennsylvania.
super fornicam	on the lavatory	Where Thomas More accused the reformer, Martin Luther, of going to celebrate Mass.
superbia in proelia	pride in battle	Motto of Manchester City F.C.
superbus via inscientiae	proud of the way of ignorance	Motto of the Alien Research Labs of the fictional Black Mesa Research Facility in the video game Half-Life (1998)
supero omnia	I surpass everything	A declaration that one succeeds above all others.
surdo oppedere	to belch before the deaf	From Erasmus' collection of annotated Adagia (1508): a useless action.
surgam	I shall rise	Motto of Columbia University's Philolexian Society.
sursum corda	Lift up your hearts	Motto of Haileybury College, Hertfordshire. The opening dialogue to the preface of the Eucharistic Prayer or Anaphora in the liturgies of the Christian Church. Hymnal for the German diocese of Paderborn from 1874 to 1975.
sutor, ne ultra crepidam	Cobbler, no further than the sandal!	Thus, don't offer your opinion on things that are outside your competence. It is said that the Greek painter Apelles once asked the advice of a cobbler on how to render the sandals of a soldier he was painting. When the cobbler started offering advice on other parts of the painting, Apelles rebuked him with this phrase in Greek. It subsequently became a popular Latin expression and a proverb in several languages: cobbler, keep to your last, German: Schuster, bleib bei deinem Leisten.
suum cuique tribuere	to render to every man his due	One of Justinian I's three basic precepts of law. Also shortened to suum cuique ("to each his own").
s.v.		Abbreviation for sub verbo or sub voce (see above).

== Notes and references ==
Notes
