= Five solae =

Principles of Protestant Christianity

The three, four or five solae (Latin: quinque solae from the Latin sola, lit. "alone"; occasionally Anglicized to five solas) of the Protestant Reformation are a foundational set of Christian theological principles theorized to be central to the doctrines of justification and salvation as taught by the Lutheran, Reformed and Evangelical branches of Protestantism, as well as in some branches of Baptist and Pentecostalism.

Each sola represents a key belief in these Protestant traditions that is putatively distinct from the theological doctrine of the Catholic Church, although they were not assembled as a theological grouping until the 20th century. The Reformers are known to have only stated two of the five solae clearly. Even today there are differences as to what constitutes the solae, how many there are, and how to interpret them to reflect the Reformers' beliefs.

== History ==
According to theologian Volker Leppin, while the sola-formulations can be found in medieval theology, these did not imply the sharp exclusiveness or contrast that Martin Luther employed; they referred to a primary or activating component, for example "their sola gratia did not exclude the presence of meritorious human works."

Martin Luther's thelogical development in the 1510s has been characterized a progression of solae as logical consequences: first solus Christus, then sola gratia, then sola fide, finally sola scriptura.

The solae were not systematically articulated together as a set of five until the 20th century; however, sola gratia and sola fide were used in phrases by the Reformers themselves. In 1554, for example, Philip Melanchthon wrote, "sola gratia justificamus et sola fide justificamur" ("only by grace do we justify and only by faith are we justified"). All of the solae appear in writings by the Protestant Reformers, but they are not catalogued together by any.

In 1916, Lutheran scholar Theodore Engelder published an article titled "The Three Principles of the Reformation: Sola Scriptura, Sola Gratia, Sola Fides" ("only scripture, only grace, only faith"). In 1934, Swiss Reformed theologian Emil Brunner substituted Soli Deo gloriam for Sola Scriptura.

In 1957, Lutheran theologian Eberhard Jüngel proposed four: solus Christus, solus gratia, solo verbo and sola fide.

In 1958, historian Geoffrey Elton, summarizing the work of John Calvin, wrote that Calvin had "joined together" the "great watchwords". Elton listed sola fide with sola gratia as one term, followed by sola scriptura and soli Deo gloria. Later, in commenting on Karl Barth's theological system, Reformed theologian Emil Brunner added Christus solus to the litany of solas while leaving out sola scriptura. The five solae are taken from a comment on Luther and Calvin in Catholic theologian Johann Baptiste Metz's 1965, The Church and the World.

== The three solae ==
In most of the earliest articulations of the solae, three were typically specified: scripture over tradition, faith over works, and grace over merit. Each was intended to represent an important distinction compared with teachings claimed in Catholic doctrine.

=== Sola scriptura ("by scripture alone") ===
Sola scriptura is upheld by Lutheran and Reformed theologies and asserts that scripture must govern over church traditions and interpretations which are themselves held to be subject to scripture. All church traditions, creeds, and teachings must be in unity with the teachings of scripture as the divinely inspired Word of God.

The doctrine of sola scriptura affirms that scripture is the only source of normative, apostolic, infallible revelation and that "all things necessary for salvation and about faith and life are taught in the Bible with sufficient clarity so that the ordinary believer can find it there and understand it."

This particular sola is sometimes called the formal principle of the Reformation, since it is the source and norm of the material cause or principle, the gospel of Jesus Christ that is received sola fide (Latin ablative, sōlā fidē, meaning "by faith alone") and sola gratia (Latin ablative, sōlā grātiā, meaning "by grace alone" or by God's favor). The adjective (sola) and the noun (scriptura) are in the ablative case rather than in the nominative case to indicate that the Bible does not stand alone apart from God, but rather that it is the instrument of God by which he reveals himself for salvation through faith in Christ (solus Christus or solo Christo).

It should be emphasized that this doctrine in no way denies tradition, reason, or experience as sources of truth. There is nothing in Sola Scriptura that eliminates other authorities. What it does say is that there is only one authority that can absolutely bind the conscience, that authority is holy scripture and that all controversies about doctrine and theology must be resolved in the final analysis by scripture.

=== Sola fide ("by faith alone") ===
Sola fide is summarized in the Thirty-nine Articles of the Anglican church, specifically Article XI "Of the Justification of Man":

We are accounted righteous before God, only for the merit of our Lord and Saviour Jesus Christ by faith, and not for our own works or deservings. Wherefore that we are justified by faith only is a most wholesome doctrine, and very full of comfort...

— Thirty-nine Articles of Religion (1571)

Bishop Scott J. Jones in United Methodist Doctrine writes that in Methodist theology:

Faith is necessary to salvation unconditionally. Good works are necessary only conditionally, that is if there is time and opportunity. The thief on the cross in Luke 23:39-43 is Wesley's example of this. He believed in Christ and was told, "Truly I tell you, today you will be with me in Paradise." This would be impossible if the good works that are the fruit of genuine repentance and faith were unconditionally necessary for salvation. The man was dying and lacked time; his movements were confined and he lacked opportunity. In his case, faith alone was necessary. However, for the vast majority of human beings good works are necessary for continuance in faith because those persons have both the time and opportunity for them.

— Scott J. Jones, United Methodist Doctrine, page 190

For Luther, baptism is a work of God by which the forgiveness of sins and salvation earned by Christ's death, and confirmed by Christ's resurrection, are given to the baptized person who believes God's Word that says He is doing exactly that in baptism. Infant baptism is not only appropriate, but urged: "We bring the child in the conviction and hope that it believes, and we pray that God may grant it faith; but we do not baptize it upon that, but solely upon the command of God."

The Bible talks about the idea of being justified by faith opposed to "works of the law":

For we hold that one is justified by faith apart from works of the law. Romans 3:28 ESV For in the gospel the righteousness of God is revealed—a righteousness that is by faith from first to last,[a] just as it is written: "The righteous will live by faith." Romans 1:17

=== Sola gratia ("by grace alone") ===
Sola gratia, or "only grace", specifically excludes the merit done by a person as part of achieving salvation. Sola gratia is the teaching that salvation comes by divine grace or "unmerited favor" only, not as something merited by the sinner. A famous verse used to back up this doctrine is:

For it is by grace you have been saved, through faith—and this is not from yourselves, it is the gift of God—not by works, so that no one can boast. Ephesians 2:8-9

It is generally understood as expressing a monergist position, however Protestant Arminians, such as Methodists, which are synergists, may also claim the doctrine of sola gratia, though they understand it quite differently than Lutherans and Calvinists do. Arminians believe that God saves only by grace and not at all by merit, but man, enabled by what is referred to as "prevenient grace", is enabled by the Holy Spirit to understand the Gospel and respond in faith. Arminians believe that this is compatible with salvation by grace alone, since all the actual saving is done by grace. Arminians believe that humans are only capable of receiving salvation when first enabled to do so by prevenient grace, which they believe is distributed to everyone. Arminians therefore do not reject the conception of sola gratia expounded by Lutheran and Reformed theologians, although their interpretation of it is quite different.

John Owen, in A Display of Arminianism, rejects the implied belief that the understanding of the Reformed theology has any alliance between the two doctrines and Arminianism is but another form of pelagianism, known as semipelagianism.

== The four solae ==
Jüngel's four solae adds solus Christus and solo verbo to solo gratia and sola fide. For Jüngel, the purpose of the solae was to characterize the Protestant view of justification in particular, not to summarize Protestantism:

They ensure that the relationship between God and humanity in the process of justiﬁcation is deﬁned as precisely as possible. In each case alone excludes the human beings from a particular aspect of the process so as to include them correctly in the process. The question of whether and how individuals are involved in the process of their justiﬁcation was the real issue in the debate between Protestants and Roman Catholics over justiﬁcation.

— Eberhard Jüngel

=== Solus Christus or solo Christo ("Christ alone" or "through Christ alone") ===
Solus Christus, or "only Christ", excludes priests as necessary for sacraments, teaching that Christ is the only mediator between God and man, and that there is salvation through no other. For this reason, the phrase is sometimes rendered in the ablative case, solo Christo, meaning that salvation is "by Christ alone".

With regard to Lutheran theology, while rejecting all other mediators between God and man, classical Lutheranism continues to honor the memory of the Virgin Mary and other exemplary saints. This principle rejects sacerdotalism, the belief that there are no sacraments in the church without the services of priests ordained by apostolic succession. Martin Luther taught the "general priesthood of the baptized", which was modified in later Lutheranism and classical Protestant theology into "the priesthood of all believers", denying the exclusive use of the title "priest" (Latin sacerdos) to the clergy. This principle does not deny the office of the priest, responsible for the public proclamation of the Gospel and the administration of the sacraments. In this way, Luther in his Small Catechism could speak of the role of "a confessor" to confer sacramental absolution on a penitent; the section in this catechism known as "The Office of the Keys" (not written by Luther but added with his approval) identifies the "called ministers of Christ" as being the ones who exercise the binding and loosing of absolution and excommunication through Law and Gospel ministry.

This binding and loosing is laid out in the Lutheran formula of holy absolution: the "called and ordained servant of the Word" forgives the penitents' sins, speaking Christ's words of forgiveness: "I forgive you all your sins", without any addition of penances or satisfactions and not as an interceding or mediating "priest", but "by virtue of [his] office as a called and ordained servant of the Word" and "in the stead and by the command of [his] Lord Jesus Christ". In this tradition, absolution reconciles the penitent with God directly through faith in Christ's forgiveness, rather than with the priest and the church as mediating entities between the penitent and God.

=== Solo verbo (by the Word only) ===
Solo verbo, or "by the Word only", is the idea that justification, i.e. the restoration of the relationship between God and humans, is "communicated only as a verbal act, including the sacraments as the visible word". Solo verbo subsumes sola scriptura to an extent.

God will not deal with us except through His external Word and Sacrament, and whatever proudly introduces itself as the Spirit instead of the Word and Sacrament is the very devil.

— Smalcald Articles

== The five solae ==
Metz asserted Christus solus as Luther's summary of the common three solae of sola scriptura, solo gratia, and solo fide, but that John Calvin's theology added soli Deo gloria.

=== Soli Deo gloria ("glory to God alone") ===
Soli Deo gloria, or "glory to God alone", stands in opposition to the veneration of Mary, the saints, and angels. According to Soli Deo gloria, all glory is for God alone, since salvation is accomplished solely through Gods will and action – not only the atonement of Jesus on the cross, but also the gift of faith in that atonement, created in the believer by the Holy Spirit. Some Reformers believed that human beings – even saints canonized by the Roman Catholic Church, the popes, and the ecclesiastical hierarchy – are not worthy of the glory that was accorded them; that is, one should not exalt humans for their good works, but rather praise and give glory to God.

== Additional solae ==
More recently, certain scholars have suggested that there should be additional solae on the list:

- Sola ecclesia ("the Church alone"),
- Sola caritas ("Charitable-love alone") and
- Solu Spiritu (In the "Spirit alone").

At the other end of the spectrum, emerging from the Imiaslavie and Primitive Catholicism streams, some Christians now affirm the "Sōlum Nōmen" position that the Holy "Name Alone" is All-sufficient, based upon the insight Jesus is "the one name that contains everything".

== See also ==
- Ecclesia semper reformanda est
