= Solus Christus =

Christian theological doctrine

Solus Christus or In Christo solo (Latin in + ablative, sōlō Christō, meaning "in Christ alone") is one of the five solae that summarize the Protestant Reformers' basic belief that salvation is by faith in Christ alone.

== Doctrine ==
Through the atoning work of Jesus Christ alone, apart from individual works, and that Christ is the only mediator between God and man. It holds that salvation cannot be obtained without Christ.

=== Biblical arguments ===
As the foundation of the "solus christus" doctrine, various biblical verses can be invoked according to theologians.

- John 14:6 – "Jesus replied: I am the way, the truth and the life. No one comes to the Father except through me."
- First Epistle to Timothy 2:5 – "Because there is only one God, and only one mediator between God and men, the man Christ Jesus."
- Acts 4:10–12 – "May all of you and all the people of Israel know that this happened in the name of Jesus Christ of Nazareth [...] And there is no salvation in anyone else; for there is no other name under heaven given among men by which we must be saved"

== See also ==
- Salvation in Christianity
- Soteriology
