= Mombasa Academy =

Kenyan international school

- Nyali, Mombasa; Kenya

Information
- Motto: scientia pennae (On Wings of Knowledge)
- Age: 2 1/2 to 19
- Language: English
- Website: www.mombasaacademy.sc.ke

The Mombasa Academy is a private coeducational international school situated in the Nyali area of Mombasa, Kenya.

== School structure ==
It provides education to children aged from two and a half years (Play group) to nineteen years (A2 level). It follows the National Curriculum for England, with all the subjects being taught in English.

The school's motto is scientia pennae; Latin for "On Wings of Knowledge".
