= Ecclesia semper reformanda est =

Latin phrase about the Christian Church

Ecclesia semper reformanda est (Latin for "the Church must always be reformed", often shortened to Ecclesia semper reformanda) is a phrase first greatly popularized by the Swiss Reformed theologian Karl Barth in 1947, allegedly deriving from a saying of St. Augustine. It most often refers to the conviction of certain Reformed Protestant theologians that the Christian Church must continually re-examine itself in order to maintain its purity of doctrine and practice.

== History ==
An early example is Jodocus van Lodenstein, Beschouwinge van Zion (Contemplation of Zion), Amsterdam, 1674–1678, who claims the "truth... that also in the Church there is always much to reform" ("Sekerlijk de Gereformeerde Waarheyd... leert dat in de Kerke ook altijd veel te herstellen is".).

A variation of the term, Ecclesia reformata semper reformanda ("the reformed church [must] always be reformed"), also used by Karl Barth, refers to the desire of an "erudite man" cited by Jodocus van Lodenstein that the Church should not be called "Reformata", but "Reformanda".

== Protestantism ==
It is widely but informally used in Reformed and Presbyterian churches today (for example, the French Reformed Church use "Ecclesia reformata, semper reformanda" as motto).

== Catholic Church ==
The first term was used by Hans Küng and other ecclesiastical reformers of the Catholic Church who were influenced by the spirit of Vatican II of the 1960s.

The Catholic Church applied the idea to personal ad institutional (rather than doctrinal) reformation in the document Lumen gentium of the Second Vatican Council, nr. 8: "Dum vero Christus, "sanctus, innocens, impollutus" (Hebr 7,26), peccatum non novit (cf. 2Cor 5,21), sed sola delicta populi repropitiare venit (cf. Hebr 2,17), Ecclesia in proprio sinu peccatores complectens, sancta simul et semper purificanda, poenitentiam et renovationem continuo prosequitur": "While Christ, holy, innocent and undefiled knew nothing of sin, but came to expiate only the sins of the people, the Church, embracing in its bosom sinners, at the same time holy and always in need of being purified, always follows the way of penance and renewal."

This latter usage appears in a 2009 pastoral letter by Bishop Ralph Walker Nickless that encourages a hermeneutic of continuity in Catholic teaching and practice.

== In popular culture ==
The phrase (without the est) is also put into the mouth of the fictional Pope Gelasius III in Mary Doria Russell's 1998 novel Children of God.

The phrase semper reformanda was used as a recurring slogan of Reform Club members in the 2022 Filipino novel Revolution: 80 Days.

== See also ==
- Five solas
