= Jodocus Van Lodenstein =

Dutch minister and poet (1620–1677)

Dominee (Ds.) Jodocus van Lodenstein

Minister of the Word
- In office 1653–1677

Personal life
- Born: Jodocus van Lodensteyn; February 6, 1620 Delft, Dutch Republic
- Died: August 6, 1677 (aged 57) Utrecht, Dutch Republic
- Buried: Oude Kerk, Delft
- Parents: Joost Cornelisz van Lodenstein (Burgomaster of Delft) (father); Maria van Voorburch Dirksdochter (mother)
- Era: Nadere Reformatie
- Education: Utrecht University; University of Franeker

Religious life
- Religion: Christianity
- Denomination: Dutch Reformed Church
- Profession: Poet, Theologian

Senior posting
- Teacher: Gisbertus Voetius, Johannes Cocceius

Jodocus Van Lodenstein (/joʊˈdoʊkəsvɑːnˈloʊdənstaɪn/; Dutch: Jodocus van Lodensteyn [joːˈdoːkɵs vɑn ˈloːdə(n)stɛin]; Delft, Netherlands, 6 February 1620 - 6 August 1677 Utrecht, Netherlands) was a Dutch pastor and poet.

== Early life ==
Van Lodenstein was born in Delft on 6 February 1620 into a prominent regent family. His father, Joost Cornelisz van Lodenstein (1584–1660), was a member of the city's social elite and served as the Burgomaster (mayor) of Delft during the mid-17th century, including the year of the Delft Thunderclap gunpowder explosion in 1654. His mother, Maria van Voorburg (1588–1667), was also of aristocratic descent. Jodocus had a notable brother, Dirk van Lodensteyn (1610–1679), who followed a secular career path typical of their family's status. Dirk served as an alderman of Delft and held the position of director of the Dutch East India Company. Despite the affluence of his upbringing Jodocus was known from a young age for his piety and personal austerity, he reportedly took a vow of chastity in his pre-adolescent years to devote his life entirely to the service of God.

His path to the ministry was initially hindered by a severe speech impediment and chronic health issues, which led his parents to discourage his clerical ambitions. However, after what he described as a providential healing of his speech, he pursued theological studies.

=== Education ===
In 1636, at the age of sixteen, Van Lodenstein entered the Utrecht Academy. There, he became a dedicated student of Gisbertus Voetius, the primary architect of the Nadere Reformatie. Under Voetius, he was trained in experiential theology. Following his graduation from Utrecht, he moved to the University of Franeker for two years (1642–1644). At Franeker, he lived in the home of and studied Oriental languages under the scholar Johannes Cocceius. Although Van Lodenstein and Cocceius would later become theological opponents due to the Voetian-Cocceian controversy during the Reformed High Orthodoxy period, they maintained a lifelong personal friendship.

== Later life ==
=== Zoetermeer and Zegwaart (1644–1650) ===
In 1644, Van Lodenstein accepted a call to the joint congregation of Zoetermeer and Zegwaart. The church had been without a permanent pastor for two years, leading to internal factions. His tenure was marked by a vigorous attempt to reform the spiritual life of the village, which met with significant resistance from some members of the affluent congregation. Van Lodenstein introduced two major changes: a demand for stricter Sabbath observance and the institution of monthly repentance sermons, a practice he adopted from the English Puritans. These reforms led to a legal challenge, within three months of his arrival, he was brought before the regional classis on charges of heresy. While the classis initially ruled against him, the local church consistory supported him and refused to read the injunction against him. He eventually won over many of his detractors through a lifestyle of humility and significant charitable giving to the poor.

=== Sluis (1650-1653) ===
In 1650, he moved to Sluis in Zeeland. This region was already a stronghold of the Nadere Reformatie due to the earlier work of Willem Teellinck. His ministry in Sluis was less controversial and allowed him to focus on the foundation of spiritual renewal that would define his later work. During this time, he published his first work, Memoriale versen, a collection of mnemonic verses on Old Testament history.

=== Utrecht (1653-1677) ===
Van Lodenstein spent the final 24 years of his life in Utrecht, serving at the Domkerk. As a younger colleague of his former teacher Gisbertus Voetius, he became a central figure in the Utrecht Circle, a group of pietistic theologians and laypeople (including Anna Maria van Schurman) dedicated to church renewal. His preaching at the Domkerk attracted capacity crowds of several thousand listeners. He was known for his discriminatory preaching or experiential preaching style, which categorized the congregation into various spiritual states, ranging from the unregenerate to the established believer, to apply the Gospel specifically to each person's soul.

==== French Occupation and Hostage Crisis (1672–1674) ====
During the Franco-Dutch War, French forces occupied Utrecht in June 1672. The Domkerk, where Van Lodenstein preached, was seized and used for Roman Catholic masses, an event he interpreted as a divine chastisement of the Dutch people.

In November 1673, as the French prepared to retreat, they took several prominent citizens hostage to ensure the payment of a massive ransom of 450,000 guilders. Van Lodenstein was among those seized and was transported to Fort Rees in Cleves. He remained in captivity for three months until the ransom was paid in February 1674. Despite the physical toll of his imprisonment, he viewed this time as spiritually profitable, using the isolation to write his Meditatiën over eenige van 's Heeren Gods eygenschappen (Meditations on Some of the Lord God's Attributes).

==== The Hurricane of 1674 ====
Shortly after his return from captivity, Utrecht was struck by a massive hurricane on 1 August 1674. The storm caused the collapse of the nave of the Domkerk, physically separating the tower from the choir. Van Lodenstein used the destruction of the church building as a central theme in his subsequent sermons, calling the city to internal repentance and spiritual renewal rather than focusing solely on the physical ruins.

== Death and Burial ==
Van Lodenstein's health, which had been fragile throughout his life, declined sharply in the spring of 1677. Despite his illness, he continued to work with the assistance of a secretary until late July. He died in Utrecht on 6 August 1677 at the age of 57. His final recorded words were: "I am so full of thoughts!"

Following his death, his body was returned to his birthplace in Delft. He was buried on 16 August 1677 in the choir of the Oude Kerk, with sixteen pallbearers carrying his coffin into the church. His resting place is marked by an ornate floor slab featuring Baroque symbols of death and eternity, shared with his parents and his brother Dirk.

== Legacy ==
Van Lodenstein is remembered as one of the most influential figures of the Nadere Reformatie. His emphasis on the inwardness of faith and the necessity of personal transformation left a lasting mark on Dutch Reformed piety. He is often associated with the phrase Ecclesia reformata, semper reformanda (The church reformed, always being reformed) though he specifically expressed it as the need for the church to be continually purified in its practice and heart, not just its doctrine.

His collection of hymns and poems became a staple of Dutch devotional life and went through dozen of editions over the next two centuries.

The Van Lodenstein College, a prominent Reformed scholastic institution in the Netherlands with multiple campuses (including Amersfoort and Ede) is named in his honor.

== Poetry ==
Van Lodenstein's poetry is characterized by a sacred restlessness and a desire for mystical union with God. His most famous collection, Uyt-spanningen (1676), contains lyrics that were widely used in Dutch Reformed devotional life for centuries.

One of his most enduring poems, Ick soeck de rust (I Seek the Rest), reflects his personal asceticism and his rejection of worldly vanity:

Original Dutch

Ick soeck de rust,
Die nergens is te vinden,
Dan in de gunst
Van Godt, die ons beminde.
De wereld is
Een woeste zee van baren,
Gods gunst gewis
Sal ons in rust bewaren.

English Translation

I seek the rest,
Which nowhere can be found,
But in the grace
Of God, who loved us first.
The world is but
A wild sea of waves,
God's grace, for sure,
Shall keep us in His peace.

He also wrote extensively on the inwardness of faith, emphasizing the presence of God within the believer, as seen in O wat een schat:

Original Dutch

O wat een schat is ons gegeven!
Godt self te hebben in dit leven,
Godt in ons hart, en wy in Hem!
Dat is de ware vreugd van ’t leven,
De ware hemel hier op aard.

English Translation

O what a treasure we’ve been given!
To have God Himself in this life,
God in our heart, and we in Him!
That is the true joy of living,
The true heaven here on earth.

== Selected works ==
- Overdenkingen of Dagelijksche Meditatiën ("Reflections or Daily Meditations", 1659)
- Weeg-schale der onvolmaacktheden ("Scale of Imperfections", 1664)
- Beschouwinge van Zion ("Contemplation of Zion", 1674)
- Meditatiën over eenige van 's Heeren Gods eygenschappen ("Meditations on Some of the Lord God's Attributes", 1674)
- Uyt-spanningen, behelsende eenige stigtelyke liederen en andere gedigten ("Recreations, containing some edifying songs and other poems", 1676)

== Sources ==
- Schroeder, Carl J. (6 June 2001). In Quest of Pentecost: Jodocus van Lodenstein and the Dutch Second Reformation. United States of America: University Press of America. ISBN 978-0761819981.
