= Sapiens dominabitur astris =

Moral rule in Latin astrology and philosophy

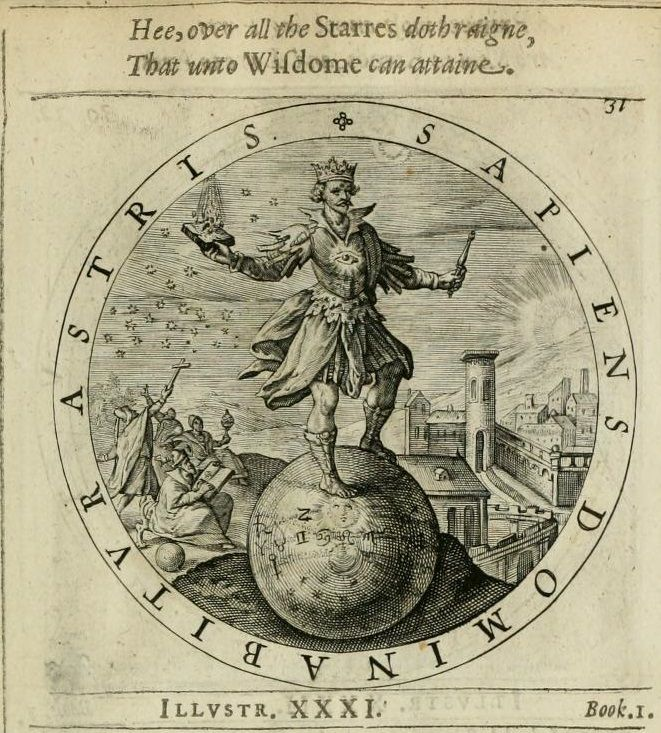
The phrase from A Collection of Emblemes Anciente and Moderne, 1635

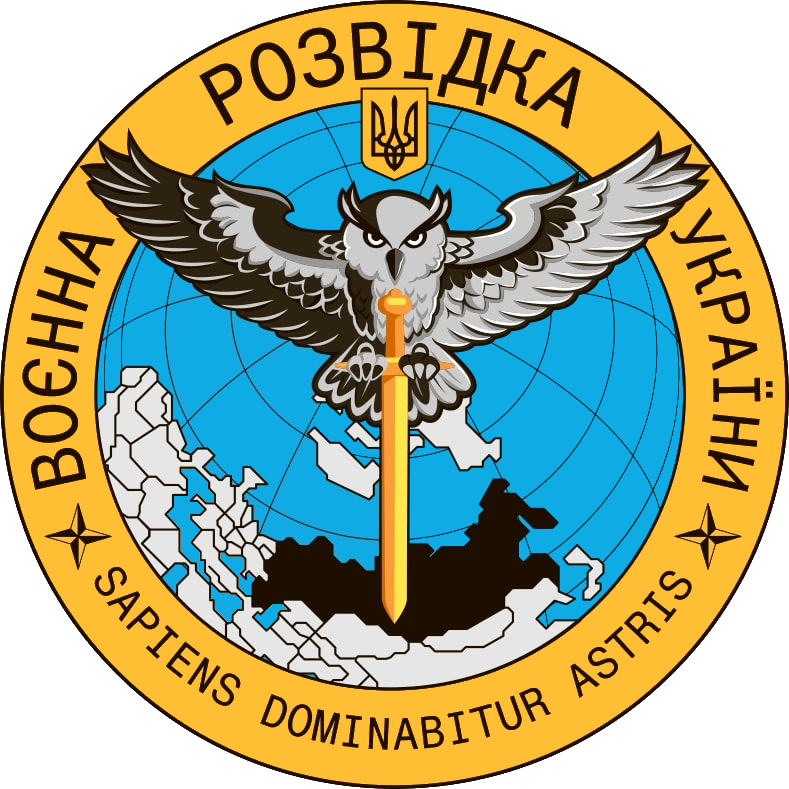
The emblem of the Ukrainian Main Directorate of Intelligence

Sapiens dominabitur astris (Latin for "The wise one will rule through the stars," but popularly taken to mean "The wise one will rule the stars") is a Latin maxim initially used in astrology, theology, philosophy and literature from the late 13th to late 17th centuries. The phrase has been traditionally attributed to Greco-Roman scientist Ptolemy, but modern scholarship views it as a compilation from two later sources. Presently, the phrase is featured on the emblem of the Main Directorate of Intelligence of Ukraine.

== History ==
The phrase began to be used in the late 13th century by both astrologers and their detractors. To astrologers, the phrase meant the mastery of astrological knowledge to predict destiny while for others it implied allegiance to Christian belief on free will and dominance of reason over fatalism and superstition.

Modern scholarship views the phrase as being likely derived from the pseudo-Ptolemaic work Centiloquium and passages from the introduction to the Introductorium maius in astrologiam (Kitāb al-mudkhal al-kabīr) by the Islamic astrologer Abu Ma'shar al-Balkhi. Both works were translated into Latin in the 1130s, making them available to most Western scholars of the time. One passage of the Centiloquium stated that "a skillful person acquainted with the nature of the stars is enabled to avert many of their effects and to prepare himself for those effects before they arrive", while another passage stated that "a sagacious mind improves the operation of the heavens, as a skillful farmer, by cultivation, improves nature". Al-Balkhi, in turn, mentioned "the benefit to the wise masters of stars through foreknowledge of the power of the conditions of the stars in this world which is evident to them".

While the phrase uses the word astrum for "star", which is synonymous with stella, in an astronomical and astrological context the word sidus (plural sidera) has been used more often. Online translations seem to favor the interpretation of astris as a dative noun with a direct-object meaning (as in "to rule the stars," "to master the stars"), but the original context and intent favor its interpretation as an instrumental ablative ("to rule through the stars," "to rule by means of the stars," "to rule with the stars"). It is through astrologers' knowledge of the cycles and repetitions of the celestial ecosystem that they are able to put themselves in command of the forces and effects these movements exert.

=== Modern usage ===
In 2016, sapiens dominabitur astris appeared on the new emblem of the Main Directorate of Intelligence of Ukraine. The phrase was chosen during the Russo-Ukrainian War in response to the Russian military intelligence's motto "above us only stars".

== See also ==
- Scientia potentia est
- List of Latin phrases
