= Knowledge is power =

Aphorism often attributed to Sir Francis Bacon

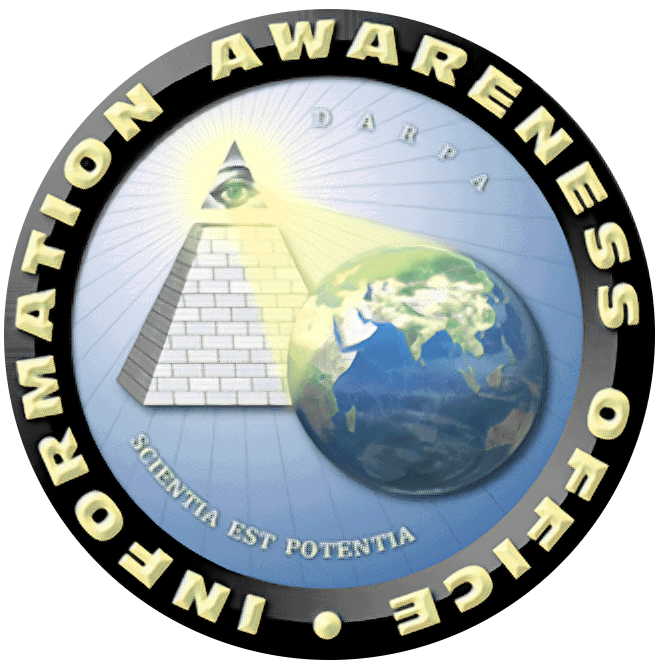
American Information Awareness Office seal with its motto scientia est potentia

Logos of the popular science magazine Znanie — sila (USSR/Russia) - in translation "Knowledge is power"

The phrase "scientia potentia est" (or "scientia est potentia" or also "scientia potestas est") is a Latin aphorism meaning "knowledge is power", commonly attributed to Sir Francis Bacon. The expression "ipsa scientia potestas est" ('knowledge itself is power') occurs in Bacon's Meditationes Sacrae (1597). The exact phrase "scientia potentia est" (knowledge is power) was written for the first time in the 1668 version of Leviathan by Thomas Hobbes, who was a secretary to Bacon as a young man. The related phrase "sapientia est potentia" is often translated as "wisdom is power".

== History ==
=== Origins and parallels ===
A proverb in practically the same wording is found in Hebrew, in the Biblical Book of Proverbs (24:5): גֶּבֶר-חָכָם בַּעוֹז; וְאִישׁ-דַּעַת, מְאַמֶּץ-כֹּחַ. This was translated in the Latin Vulgata as "vir sapiens fortis est et vir doctus robustus et validus" and in the King James Version as "A wise man is strong, a man of knowledge increaseth strength". The Persian poet Ferdowsi (940–1019/1025) wrote توانا بود هر که دانا بود (tavânâ bûd har ke dânâ bûd) "Mighty is the one who has knowledge."

=== Thomas Hobbes ===
The first known reference of the exact phrase appeared in the Latin edition of Leviathan (1668; the English version had been published in 1651). This passage from Part 1 ("De Homine"), Chapter X ("De Potentia, Dignitate et Honore") occurs in a list of various attributes of man which constitute power; in this list, "sciences" or "the sciences" are given a minor position:

Scientia potentia est, sed parva; quia scientia egregia rara est, nec proinde apparens nisi paucissimis, et in paucis rebus. Scientiae enim ea natura est, ut esse intelligi non possit, nisi ab illis qui sunt scientia praediti

In the English version this passage reads as thus:

The sciences are small powers; because not eminent, and therefore, not acknowledged in any man; nor are at all, but in a few, and in them, but of a few things. For science is of that nature, as none can understand it to be, but such as in a good measure have attained it.

On a later work, De Corpore (1655), also written in Latin, Hobbes expanded the same idea:

The end or scope of philosophy is, that we may make use to our benefit of effects formerly seen ... for the commodity of human life ... The end of knowledge is power ... lastly, the scope of all speculation is the performing of some action, or thing to be done.

In Hobbes and the social contract tradition (1988), Jean Hampton indicates that this quote is 'after Bacon' and in a footnote, that 'Hobbes was Bacon's secretary as a young man and had philosophical discussions with him' (Aubrey 1898, 331).

=== Francis Bacon ===
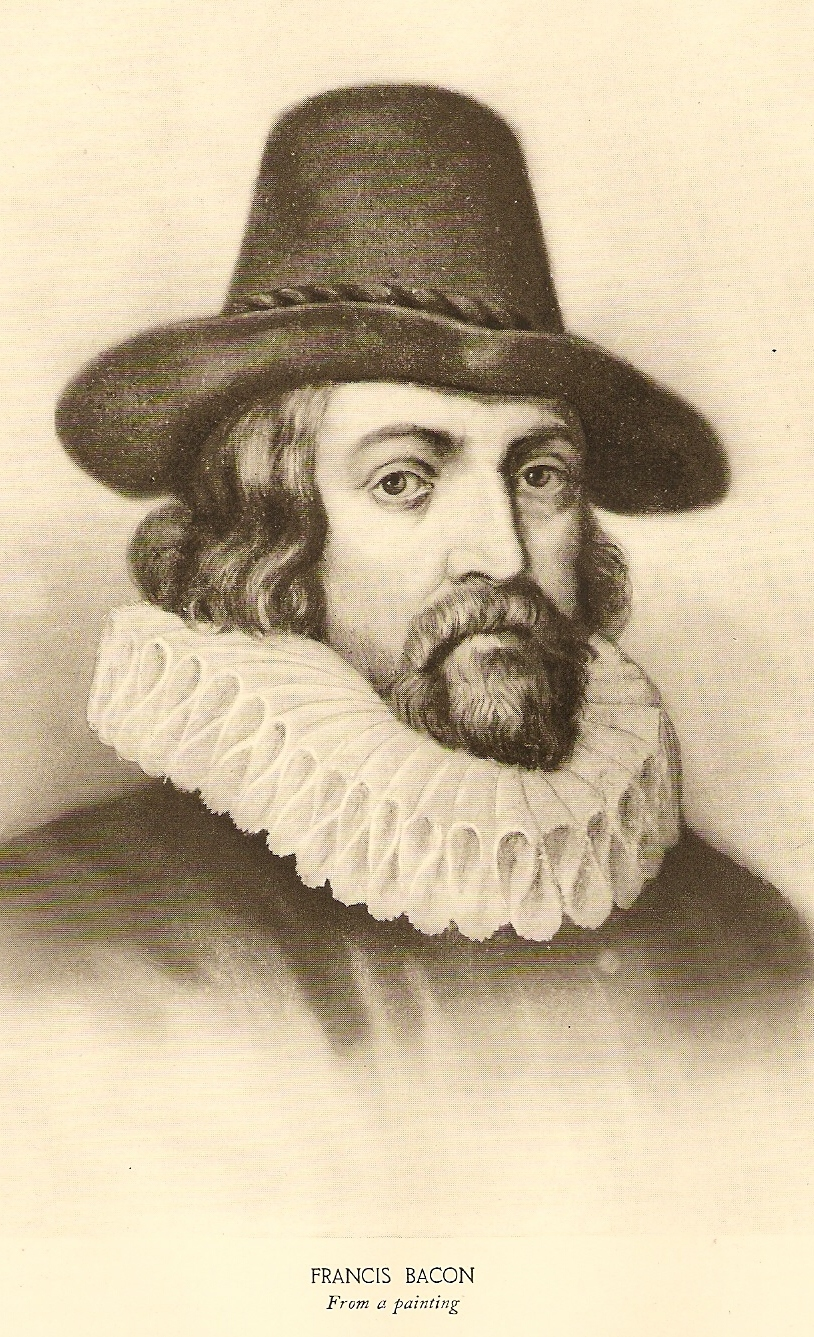
Sir Francis Bacon, "ipsa scientia potestas est" (knowledge itself is power). Meditationes Sacrae (1597).

The closest expression in Bacon's works is, perhaps, the expression "ipsa scientia potestas est", found in his Meditationes Sacrae (1597), which is translated as "knowledge itself is power":

statuuntque latiores terminos scientiae Dei quam potestatis, vel potius ejus partis potestatis Dei (nam et ipsa scientia potestas est) qua scit, quam ejus qua movet et agit: ut praesciat quaedam otiose, quae non praedestinet et praeordinet.

One of many differing English translations of this section includes the following:

This canon is the mother of all canons against heresies. The cause of error is twofold : ignorance of the will of God, and ignorance or superficial consideration of the power of God. The will of God is more revealed through the Scriptures… his power more through his creatures… So is the plenitude of God's power to be asserted, as not to involve any imputation upon his will. So is the goodness of his will to be asserted, as not to imply any derogation of his power. … Atheism and Theomachy rebels and mutinies against the power of God; not trusting to his word, which reveals his will, because it does not believe in his power, to whom all things are possible… But of the heresies which deny the power of God, there are, besides simple atheism, three degrees…

The third degree is of those who limit and restrain the former opinion to human actions only, which partake of sin: which actions they suppose to depend substantively and without any chain of causes upon the inward will and choice of man; and who give a wider range to the knowledge of God than to his power; or rather to that part of God's power (for knowledge itself is power) whereby he knows, than to that whereby he works and acts; suffering him to fore know some things as an unconcerned looker on, which he does not predestine and preordain : a notion not unlike the figment which Epicurus introduced into the philosophy of Democritus, to get rid of fate and make room for fortune; namely the sidelong motion of the Atom; which has ever by the wiser sort been accounted a very empty device.

— pp. 94–95; Works of Bacon, Vol XIV, Boston; Brown and Taggard, 1861

Interpretation of the notion of power meant by Bacon must therefore take into account his distinction between the power of knowing and the power of working and acting, the opposite of what is assumed when the maxim is taken out of context. Indeed, the quotation has become a cliche.

In the better-known Novum Organum, Bacon wrote, "Human knowledge and human power meet in one; for where the cause is not known the effect cannot be produced. Nature to be commanded must be obeyed; and that which in contemplation is as the cause is in operation as the rule."

=== Ralph Waldo Emerson ===
Ralph Waldo Emerson wrote in his essay Old Age, included in the collection Society and Solitude (1870):

Skill to do comes of doing; knowledge comes by eyes always open, and working hands; and there is no knowledge that is not power.

=== Wissen ist Macht in Germany ===
After the 1871 unification of Germany, "Wissen ist Macht, geographisches Wissen ist Weltmacht" (Knowledge is power, geographical knowledge is world power) was often used in German geopolitics and the public discussion to support efforts for a German colonial empire after 1880. Julius Perthes, for example, used the motto for his publishing house. However, this installation of geographical research followed popular requests and was not imposed by the government. In particular, Count Bismarck was not much interested in German colonial adventures; his envoy Gustav Nachtigal started with the first protectorates, but was more interested in ethnological aspects.

After World War I, German geopolitics tried to contribute to efforts to regain world power. Scholars like Karl Haushofer, a former general, and his son Albrecht Haushofer (both in close contact with Rudolf Hess) got worldwide attention with their concept of geopolitics. Associations of German geographers and schoolteachers welcomed the Machtergreifung and hoped to get further influence in the new regime.

Germany's postwar geopolitics was much more cautious; concepts of political geography and projection of power had not been widespread scholarly topics in Germany until 1989.

Geographical knowledge is however still of importance in Germany. Germans tend to mock US politicians' and celebrities' comparable lack of interest in the topic. A Sponti (Außerparlamentarische Opposition) version of the slogan is "Wissen ist Macht, nichts wissen macht auch nichts", a pun about the previous motto meaning "Knowledge is power, knowing nothing is no problem, either."

The German Bundeswehr Bataillon Elektronische Kampfführung 932, an electronic warfare unit based in Frankenberg (Eder), still uses the Latin version Scientia potentia est as its motto.

== Theories ==
In the modern and contemporary inquiries of the proposition, Stephen Gill furthered Robert Cox's deconstructive statement on the ontology of knowledge, with an objective epistemological statement that "any theory of knowledge production needs to have a power dimension".

== See also ==
- Information warfare
- Intelligence (information gathering)
- List of Latin phrases
- Power-knowledge
- Rationality and power
- Sapiens dominabitur astris

== Bibliography ==
- Thomas Hobbes, Opera philosophica, quae latine scripsit, omnia in unum corpus nunc primum collecta studio et labore Gulielmi Molesworth, Bart. (London: Bohn, 1839–45).
- Thomas Hobbes, The English Works of Thomas Hobbes of Malmesbury; Now First Collected and Edited by Sir William Molesworth, Bart. (London: Bohn, 1839–45). 11 vols.
- Ralph Waldo Emerson, Society and Solitude. Twelve Chapters, Boston, The Riverside Press, 1892.
