= Formal and material principles of theology =

Two principles that help in defining and understanding theology of Christian tradition

Formal principle and material principle are two categories in Christian theology to identify and distinguish the authoritative source of theology (formal principle) from the theology itself, especially the central doctrine of that theology (material principle), of a religion, religious movement, tradition, body, denomination, or organization. A formal principle tends to be texts or revered leaders of the religion; a material principle is its central teaching. Paul Tillich believes the identification and application of this pair of categories in theological thinking to have originated in the 19th century.

As early as 1845 the Protestant theologian and historian Philip Schaff discussed them in his The Principle of Protestantism. They were utilized by the Lutheran scholar F. E. Mayer in his 1961 The Religious Bodies of America in order to facilitate a comparative study of the faith and practice of Christian denominations in the United States. This is also treated in a theological pamphlet entitled Gospel and Scripture by the Commission on Theology and Church Relations of the Lutheran Church – Missouri Synod.

== F. E. Mayer's findings ==
=== Eastern Orthodoxy ===
- Formal Principle – the Bible and the "sacred tradition".
- Material Principle – Jesus Christ's work of theopoiesis or theosis (θέωσις), the ultimate deification of man. They cite Athanasius of Alexandria from his Incarnation of the Word: "Christ assumed humanity that we might become God."

=== Roman Catholicism ===
- Formal Principle – the Bible, Tradition, Reason, the Pope, and the Magisterium.
- Material Principle – "Man's soul, since it comes directly from God, is good and strives for reunion with God, realized in the beatific vision of God. Man's body is subject to sin and is alienated from God. Therefore man must be progressively justified, i.e., be made just. This result is effected when through the sacraments man enters into the 'state of grace' and observes the commandments which the church... by her 'divine commission,' imposes upon the 'faithful.'"

=== Lutheranism ===
- Formal Principle – the Bible alone (sola Scriptura)
- Material Principle – "a synopsis and summary of the Christian truth" that people are justified by God's grace through faith in Christ alone.

=== Anglicanism ===
- Formal Principle in general – The Bible, the authority of the church, and reason. Specifically, for individuals of different churchmanship:

- Low Church – the Bible as the only source and the all sufficient norm of religious truth.
- High Church – "doctrinal authority rested successively in Christ, in the teaching church, in the Scriptures, and in the councils." This is called the consensus fidelium ("agreement of the faithful").
- Broad Church – along with the Bible and the consensus fidelium is included "God's self-disclosure in the religious and moral development of the human race as a whole, in the religion of Israel, the person of Christ, and the life of His mystical body, the church".

- Material Principle:

- Low Church – "the doctrine of God's grace which faith apprehends without the addition of human works."
- High Church – the worship of the church and apostolic succession.
- Broad Church – a life which conforms to the ethical teachings of Jesus.

=== Zwinglianism ===
- Formal Principle – the Bible and direct revelation from the Holy Spirit.
- Material Principle – absolute divine causality.

=== Calvinism ===
- Formal Principle – the Bible as the sole standard of all truth (sola scriptura).
- Material Principle – sinful man is justified by faith alone (sola fide).

=== Methodism ===
- Formal Principle – the Bible, reason, teachings of the ancient church.
- Material Principle – the perfected man, i.e. entire sanctification.
