= Arminianism =

Protestant theological movement

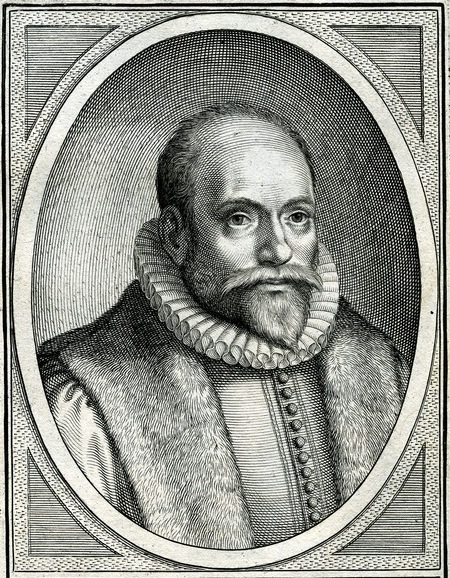
Jacobus Arminius in a 1625 engraving by W. Swanenburgh

Arminianism is a theological tradition within Protestantism that emerged in the early 17th century and is based on the ideas of the Dutch Reformed theologian Jacobus Arminius and his followers, known as the Remonstrants. Dutch Arminianism was one of the first structured responses to Calvinist doctrines, particularly their interpretation of predestination.

Central to Arminian theology is the belief that God extends prevenient grace to all people, thereby preparing them for regeneration. It also teaches that the grace that enables regeneration and ongoing sanctification can be resisted. The two main variants of Arminian thought are Classical Arminianism, principally associated with Arminius, and Wesleyan Arminianism, principally associated with John Wesley.

Many Protestant denominations have been influenced by Arminian views, notably the Baptists in the 17th century, the Methodists in the 18th century, and the Pentecostals in the 20th century.

== History ==
=== Precursor movements and theological influences ===
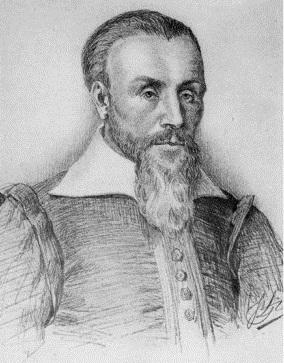
Theologian Sebastian Castellio, portrait by Jean-Paul Laurens (1892)

Arminius's beliefs later referred to as Arminianism did not begin with him. Before the Reformation, groups like the Waldensians similarly affirmed individual freedom over any predetermined predestination. Anabaptist theologian Balthasar Hubmaier (1480–1528) also promoted much the same view as Arminius would, nearly a century later. The soteriological doctrines of Arminianism and Anabaptism are roughly equivalent. In particular, Mennonites have been historically Arminian whether they distinctly espoused the Arminian viewpoint or not, and rejected Calvinist soteriology. Anabaptist theology seems to have influenced Jacobus Arminius. At least, he was "sympathetic to the Anabaptist point of view, and Anabaptists were commonly in attendance on his preaching." Similarly, Arminius mentions Danish Lutheran theologian Niels Hemmingsen (1513–1600) as holding the basic view of soteriology he held, and he may have been influenced by Hemmingsen. Another key figure, Sebastian Castellio (1515–1563), who opposed Calvin's views on predestination and religious intolerance, is known to have influenced both the Mennonites and certain theologians within Arminius's circle. Early critics of Arminians even cited Castellio as a primary inspiration behind the Arminian movement.

=== Dutch Arminianism ===
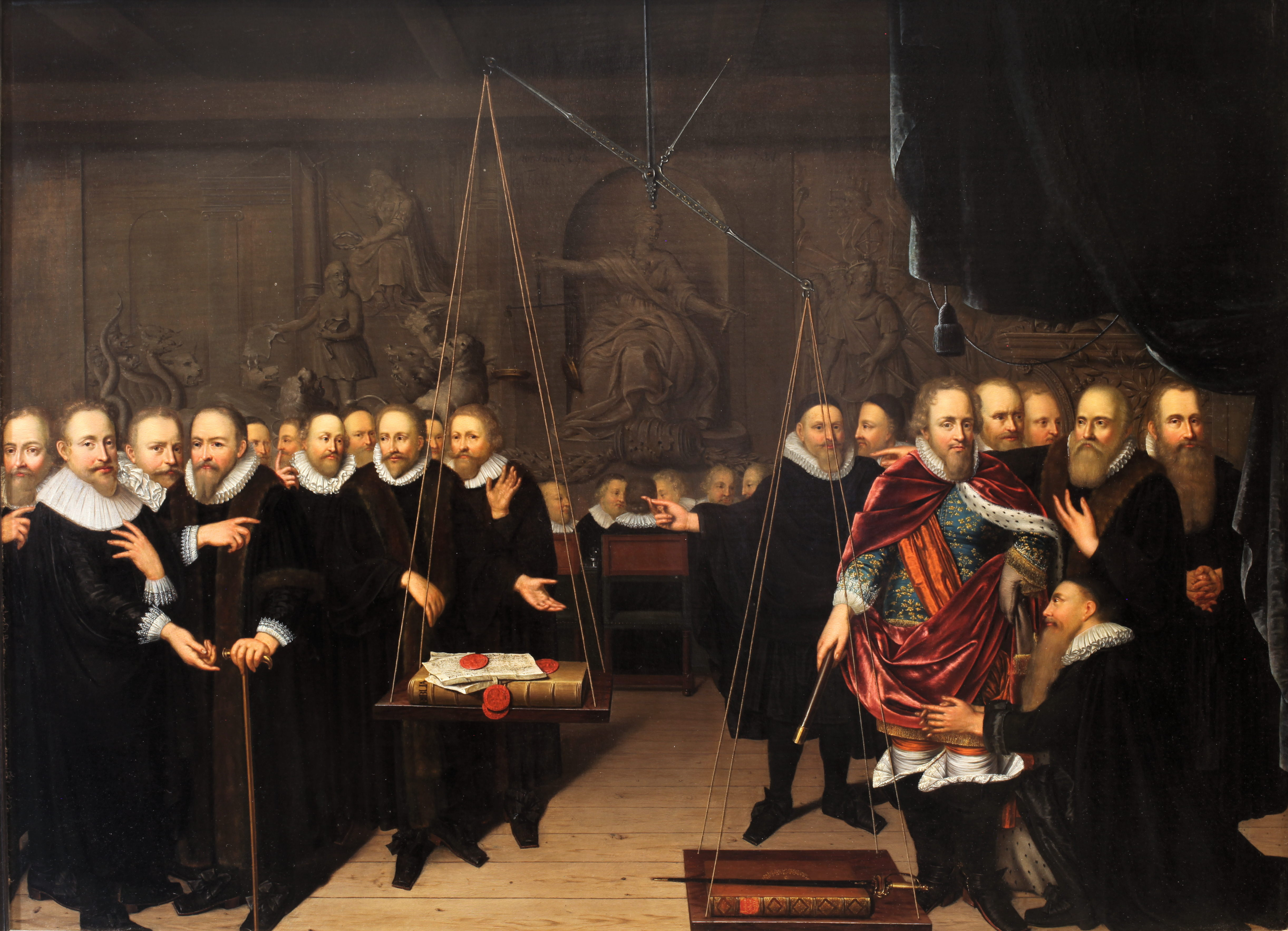
Eyk, Abraham van der (1721). Disputes Between Remonstrants and Counter-Remonstrants in 1618.

Jacobus Arminius (1560–1609) was a Dutch pastor and theologian. He was taught by Theodore Beza, Calvin's hand-picked successor, but after examination of the scriptures, he rejected his teacher's theology that it is God who unconditionally elects some for salvation. Instead Arminius proposed that the election of God was "of believers", thereby making it conditional on faith. Arminius's views were challenged by the Dutch Calvinists, especially Franciscus Gomarus.

In his Declaration of Sentiments (1608) Arminius presented his theology to magistrates of the States General of the Netherlands in The Hague. After his death, Arminius's followers continued to advance his theological vision, crafting the Five articles of Remonstrance (1610), in which they express their points of divergence from the stricter Calvinism of the Belgic Confession. This is how Arminius's followers were called Remonstrants, and following a Counter Remonstrance in 1611, Gomarus' followers were called Counter-Remonstrants.

After some political maneuvering, the Dutch Calvinists were able to convince Prince Maurice of Nassau to deal with the situation. Maurice systematically removed Arminian magistrates from office and called a national synod at Dordrecht. This Synod of Dort was open primarily to Dutch Calvinists (102 people), while the Arminians were excluded (13 people banned from voting), with Calvinist representatives from other countries (28 people), and in 1618 published a condemnation of Arminius and his followers as heretics. The Canons of Dort responded, among other topics, to Arminian doctrines, anticipating their later articulation as the Five Points of Calvinism.

Arminians across Holland were removed from office, imprisoned, banished, and sworn to silence. Twelve years later, Holland officially granted Arminianism protection as a religion, although animosity between Arminians and Calvinists continued. Most of the early Remonstrants followed a classical version of Arminianism. However, some of them such as Philipp van Limborch, moved in the direction of semi-Pelagianism and rationalism.

=== Arminianism in the Church of England ===
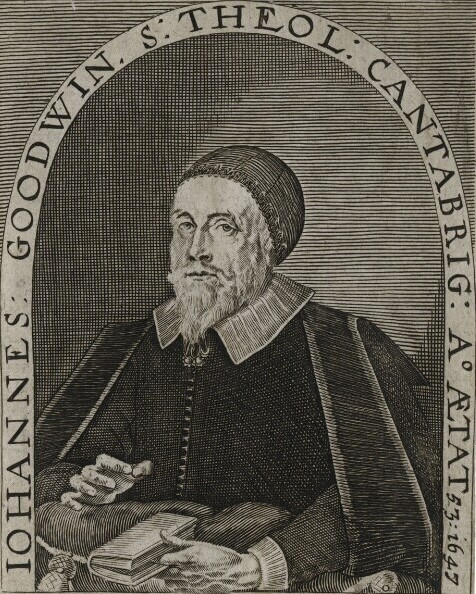
Portrait of John Goodwin by George Glover (1641)

In England, the so-labelled Arminian doctrines were held, in substance, before and in parallel with those of Arminius. The Thirty-nine Articles of Religion (finalised in 1571), were sufficiently ambiguous that they were compatible with either Arminian or Calvinistic interpretations. Arminianism in the Church of England was fundamentally an expression of negation of Calvinism, and only some theologians held to classical Arminianism, while the rest were either semi-Pelagian or Pelagian. In this specific context, contemporary historians prefer to use the term "proto-Arminians" rather than "Arminians" to designate the leanings of those divines who generally did not follow classical Arminianism. English Arminianism was represented by Arminian Puritans such as John Goodwin or High Anglican Arminians such as Jeremy Taylor and Henry Hammond. Anglican Arminians of the 17th century such as William Laud fought Calvinist Puritans. They saw Arminianism in terms of a state church, an idea that was alien to the views of Arminius. In many cases, "Arminianism" was a label applied by their enemies. This position became particularly evident under the reign (1625–1649) of Charles I. Following the Interregnum (1649–1660), King Charles II, who tolerated the Presbyterians, re-instituted Arminian thought in the Church of England. It was dominant there after the Restoration (1660) for some fifty years.

=== Baptists ===
The Baptist tradition emerged in the early 17th century in England. The first Baptists, led by the theologian Thomas Helwys, were later called "General Baptists" because of their doctrine of general atonement, an Arminian doctrine. Later General Baptists, such as John Griffith, Samuel Loveday, and Thomas Grantham, defended a soteriology similar to Classical Arminianism that reflected the original teaching of Arminius. The General Baptists encapsulated their views in numerous confessions, the most influential of which was the Standard Confession. In the 1640s the Particular Baptists were formed, diverging from any Arminian doctrine and embracing the strong Calvinism of the Presbyterians and Independents. Their robust Calvinism was publicized in such confessions as the First London Confession of Faith of 1644 and the Second London Confession of 1689. The Second London Confession was used by Calvinistic Baptists in America, and later revised in 1742, forming the Philadelphia Confession of Faith, whereas the Standard Confession of 1660 was used by the General Baptists and their American heirs known as Free Will Baptists.

=== Methodists ===
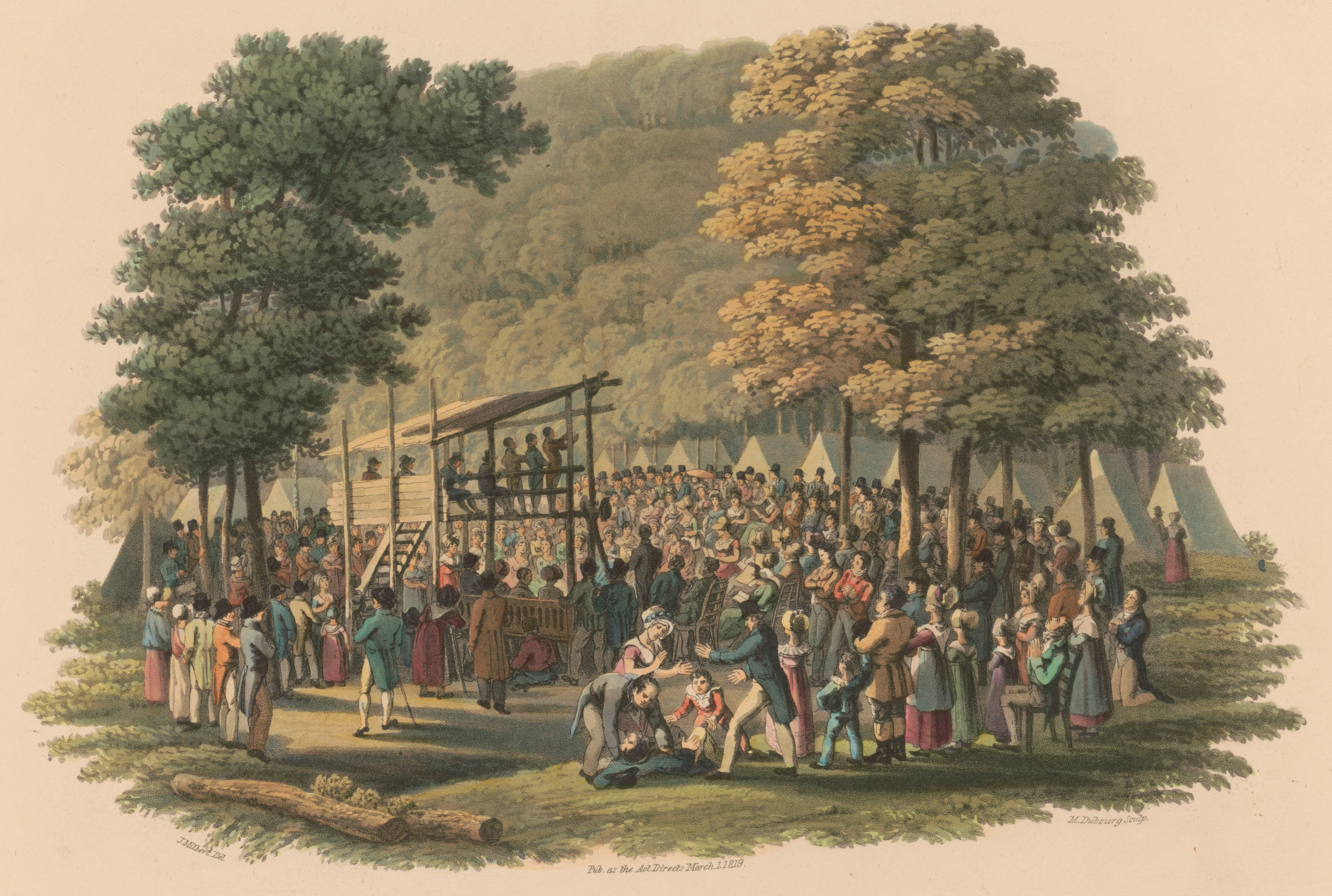
Milbert, Jacques Gérard. (c. 1819). Camp meeting of the Methodists in N. America

In the Methodist–Calvinist controversy of the early 1770s involving Anglican ministers John Wesley and George Whitefield, Wesley responded to accusations of semi-Pelagianism by embracing an Arminian identity. Wesley had limited familiarity with the beliefs of Arminius and largely formulated his views without direct reliance on Arminius's teachings. Wesley was notably influenced by 17th-century English Arminianism and by some Remonstrant spokesmen. However, he is recognized as a faithful representative of Arminius's beliefs. Wesley defended his soteriology through the publication of a periodical titled The Arminian (1778) and in articles such as Predestination Calmly Considered. To support his stance, he strongly maintained belief in total depravity while clarifying other doctrines, notably prevenient grace. At the same time, Wesley attacked the determinism that he claimed characterized Calvinist doctrines of predestination. He typically preached the notion of Christian perfection (fully mature, not "sinlessness"). His system of thought has become known as Wesleyan Arminianism, the foundations of which were laid by him and his fellow preacher John William Fletcher. Methodism also navigated its own theological intricacies concerning salvation and human agency. In the 1830s, during the Second Great Awakening, traces of Pelagian influence surfaced in the American Holiness Movement. Consequently, critics of Wesleyan theology have occasionally unfairly perceived or labeled its broader thought. However, its core is recognized to be Arminianism.

=== Pentecostals ===
Pentecostalism has its background in the activity of Charles Parham (1873–1929). Its origin as a movement was in the Azusa Street Revival in Los Angeles in 1906. This revival was led by William J. Seymour (1870–1922). Due to the Methodist and Holiness background of many early Pentecostal preachers, the Pentecostal churches usually possessed practices that arose from the Wesleyan Arminianism. During the 20th century, as Pentecostal churches began to settle and incorporate more standard forms, they started to formulate theology that was fully Arminian. Today, Pentecostal denominations such as the Assemblies of God hold to Arminian views such as resistible grace, conditional election, and conditional security of the believer.

== Contemporary Arminianism ==
=== Protestant denominations ===
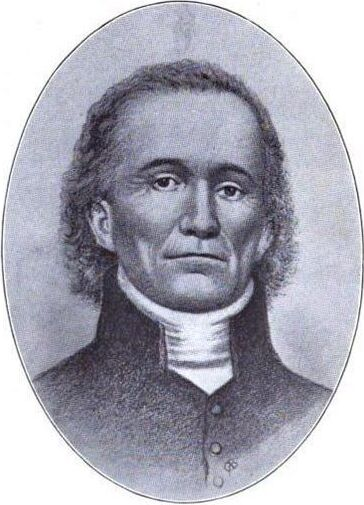
Anonymous (1915). Benjamin Randall (founder of the Free Baptist denomination).

Advocates of Arminianism find a home in many Protestant denominations, and sometimes other beliefs such as Calvinism exist within the same denomination. The Lutheran theological tradition bears certain similarities to Arminianism and there may be some Lutheran churches that are open to it. Newer Evangelical Anglican denominations also show a level of openness to Arminian theology. Anabaptist denominations, such as the Mennonites, Hutterites, Amish and Schwarzenau Brethren, adhere to Anabaptist theology, which espouses a soteriology that is similar to Arminianism "in some respects". Arminianism is found within the General Baptists, including the subset of General Baptists known as Free Will Baptists. The majority of Southern Baptists embrace a traditionalist form of Arminianism which includes a belief in eternal security. Though it is not the predominant, Calvinism is well represented within the convention. Certain proponents of Arminianism may be found within the Restoration movement in the Christian Churches and Churches of Christ. Additionally, it is found in the Seventh-day Adventist Church. Arminianism (specifically Wesleyan–Arminian theology) is taught in the Methodist churches, inclusive of those denominations aligned with the holiness movement such as the Evangelical Methodist Church, Church of the Nazarene, the Free Methodist Church, the Wesleyan Church, and the Salvation Army. It is also found in a part of the Charismatics, including the Pentecostals.

=== Scholarly support ===
Arminian theology has found support among theologians, Bible scholars, and apologists spanning various historical periods and theological circles. Noteworthy historical figures include Jacobus Arminius, Simon Episcopius, Hugo Grotius, John Goodwin, Thomas Grantham, John Wesley, Richard Watson, Thomas Osmond Summers, John Miley, William Burt Pope and Henry Orton Wiley.

In contemporary Baptist traditions, advocates of Arminian theology include Roger E. Olson, F. Leroy Forlines, Robert Picirilli and J. Matthew Pinson. Within the Methodist tradition, prominent supporters encompass Thomas Oden, Ben Witherington III, David Pawson, B. J. Oropeza, Thomas H. McCall and Fred Sanders. The Holiness movement boasts theologians like Carl O. Bangs, H. Ray Dunning and J. Kenneth Grider. Furthermore, scholars such as Keith D. Stanglin, Craig S. Keener and Grant R. Osborne also support Arminian perspectives.

== Theological developments ==
=== Theological legacy ===
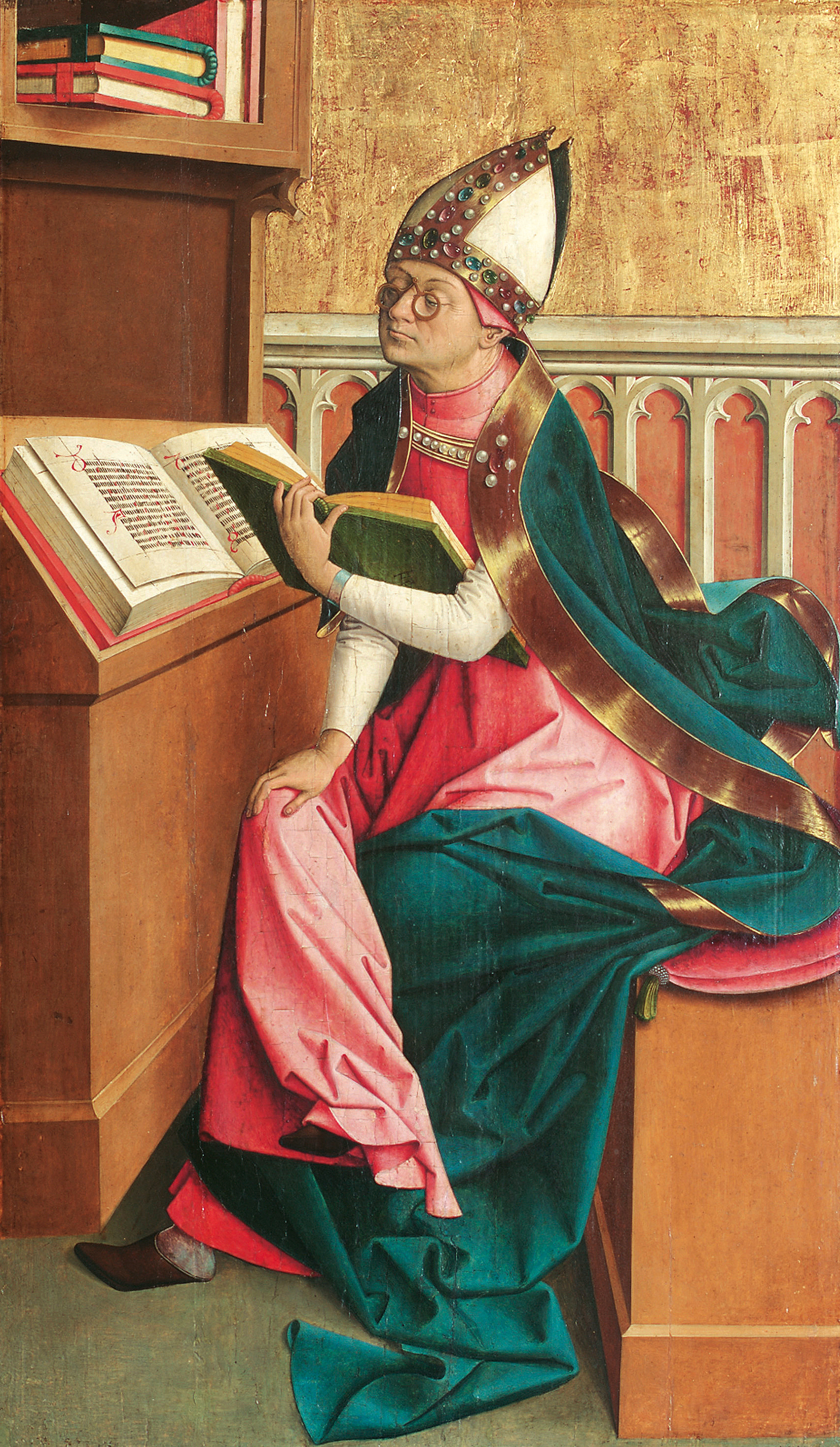
Master of Großgmain. (c. 1498). Augustinus.

The Pelagian-Augustinian framework can serve as a key paradigm for understanding Arminianism's theological and historical legacy. Before Augustine (354–430), the synergistic view of salvation was almost universally endorsed. Pelagius (c. 354–418), however, argued that humans could perfectly obey God by their own will. The Pelagian view is therefore referred to as "human monergism". This view was condemned at the Council of Carthage (418) and Ephesus (431). In response, Augustine proposed a view in which God is the ultimate cause of all human actions, a compatibilist form of theological determinism. The Augustinian view is therefore referred to as "divine monergism". However, Augustinian soteriology implied double predestination, which was condemned by the Council of Arles (475).

During this period, a moderate form of Pelagianism emerged, later termed semi-Pelagianism. This view asserted that human will initiates salvation, rather than divine grace. The Semi-Pelagian view is therefore described as "human-initiated synergism". In 529, the Second Council of Orange addressed Semi-Pelagianism and declared that even the inception of faith is a result of God's grace. This highlights the role of prevenient grace enabling human belief. This view, often referred to as "Semi-Augustinian", is therefore described as "God-initiated synergism". The council also rejected predestination to evil. As Arminianism aligns with key aspects of this view, some see it as a return to early Church theological consensus. Moreover, Arminianism can also be seen as a soteriological diversification of Calvinism or, more specifically, as a theological middle ground between Calvinism and semi-Pelagianism.

=== Theological main traditions ===
Arminian theology generally divides into two main variations: Classical Arminianism, based on the teachings of Jacobus Arminius, and Wesleyan Arminianism, a closely related variation shaped primarily by John Wesley.

==== Classical Arminianism ====
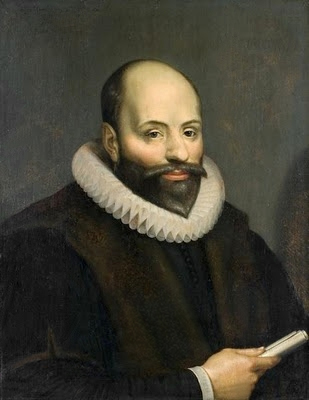
Bailly, David (1620). Jacobus Arminius.

Classical Arminianism is a Protestant theological position which affirms that God's prevenient grace for regeneration is universal and that the grace allowing both regeneration and ongoing sanctification is resistible. This theological system was developed from the Arminius's teachings and maintained by some of the Remonstrants, such as Simon Episcopius and Hugo Grotius.

The thought of Jacobus Arminius was first notably expressed in his Declaration of Sentiments (1608) and was later articulated in the Five Articles of Remonstrance. Arminian theology incorporates the language and framework of covenant theology. Some theologians have referred to this system as "classical Arminianism". Others prefer the terms "Reformation Arminianism" or "Reformed Arminianism", highlighting how Arminius upheld core principles of the Reformation such as sola fide and sola gratia.

==== Wesleyan Arminianism ====
John Wesley thoroughly agreed with the vast majority of what Arminius himself taught. Wesleyan Arminianism is therefore regarded as a closely related development of Arminian theology, shaped primarily by Wesley, essentially adding Wesleyan perfectionism to classical Arminianism. Methodism, in turn, lays greater stress on the subjective experience of conversion and regeneration, with its preaching centered on an immediate and radical change of heart and life.

== Theological positions ==
=== God's providence and human free will ===
Arminianism holds that God is both omnipotent and omniscient. His power and knowledge are not subject to any external limitation but are exercised in accordance with his own divine nature and character. This understanding of God gives rise to two fundamental principles. First, divine action must be conceived in such a way that God is never, even secondarily, the author of evil, since this would contradict his character, especially as fully revealed in Jesus Christ. Second, human responsibility for evil must be preserved. These two principles shape the Arminian understanding of divine sovereignty. God exercises a limited mode of providence, deliberately governing creation without determining every event, and his election is understood as a "predestination by foreknowledge". Consequently, God's foreknowledge is exhaustive and complete, fully compatible with human freedom of action.

=== Human free will ===
==== Philosophical view ====
Arminianism is aligned with classical free-will theism, adopting an incompatibilist position. It asserts that the free will essential for moral responsibility is inherently incompatible with determinism. In Arminian theology, human beings possess libertarian free will, making them the ultimate source of their choices and granting them the ability to choose otherwise. This philosophical framework upholds the concept of divine providence, allowing God's influence and supervision over creation. However, it permits the idea of God's absolute control over human actions, as long as such control does not involve human responsibility.

==== Spiritual view ====
Arminianism holds that all humans are deprived of the full presence of the Holy Spirit and, as a result, exist in a moral state of total depravity. In this condition, human free will is incapable of choosing spiritual good without the aid of divine grace. Arminius likely believed that every person is born in this depraved condition because Adam, as humanity's representative, sinned against God—a view later shared by several prominent Arminians. Like Augustine, Luther, and Calvin, Arminius agreed that human free will is spiritually "captive" and "enslaved". However, through the action of prevenient grace, human free will can be "freed", meaning it can be restored with the ability to choose the spiritual good, particularly the capacity to accept God's call to salvation.

=== Election of man ===
==== Election based on divine foreknowledge ====
The majority Arminian view is that election is individual and conditional upon God's foreknowledge of faith. According to Arminius, election is the decree by which God decides that all who believe in Jesus through faith will be justified. In a related sense, predestination in Arminian theology may be understood as the determination of the destiny of those who do believe. Thus, God predestines the elect to a glorious future: it does not refer to the act of coming to faith, but to the believer’s future inheritance. The elect are therefore predestined to sonship through adoption, glorification, and eternal life.

==== Corporate election view ====
In the corporate election view, God chose the believing church collectively for salvation rather than selecting individuals. In this view, Jesus is seen as the only person elected, and individuals join the elect through faith "in Christ". This view is supported by Old Testament and Jewish concepts, where identity is rooted more in group membership than individuality. Though not the traditional Arminian position, corporate election is nonetheless consistent with Arminian theology, since it makes election conditional upon faith in Christ.

=== Reconciliation with God ===
==== Unlimited atonement with conditional application to faith ====
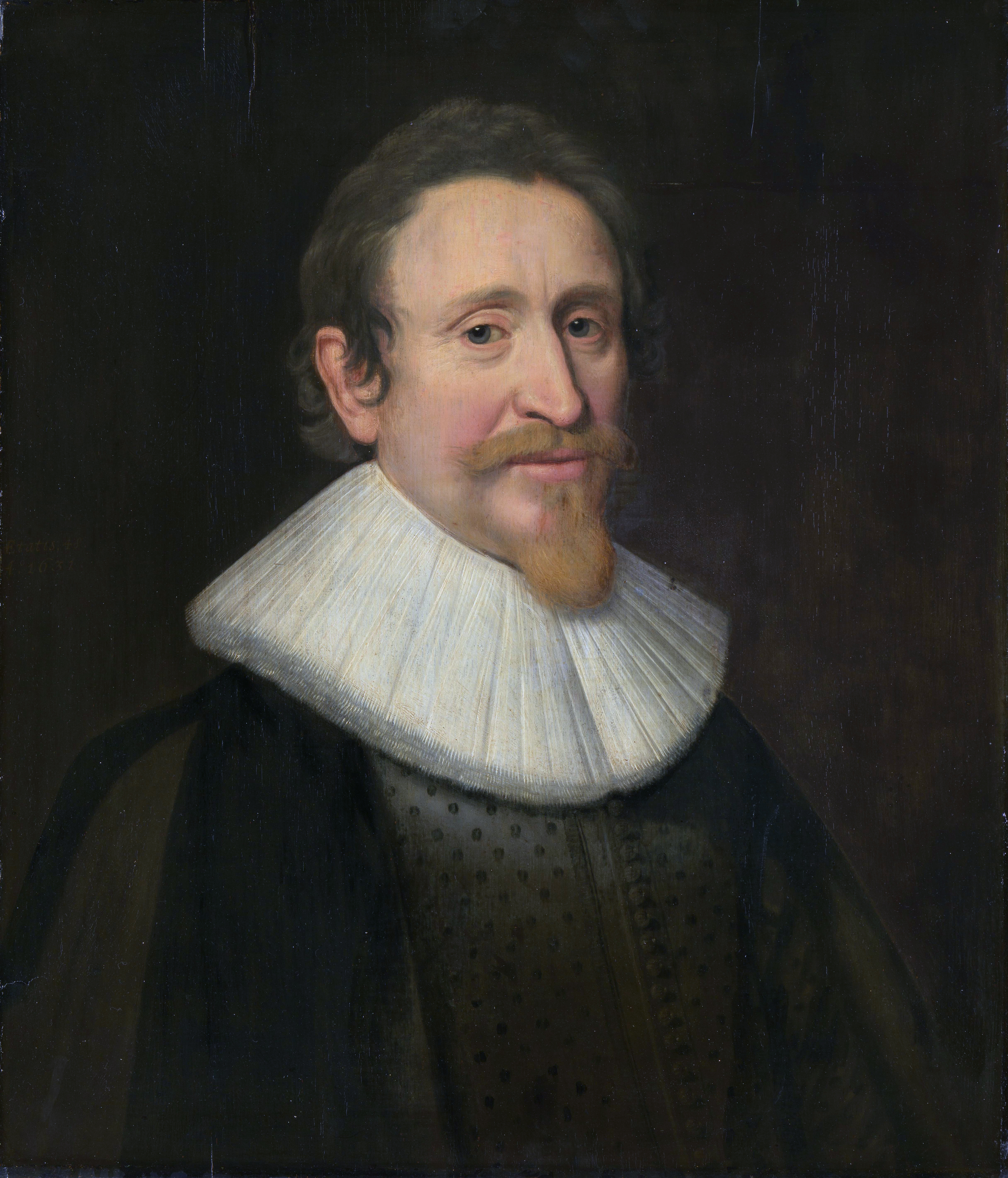
Michiel Jansz. van Mierevelt (1631). Hugo de Groot (1583–1645).

Historically, Arminius, in agreement with certain Reformed theologians, held that reconciliation with God is based in forgiveness made possible through an expiation grounded on penal substitution. In this view, at the crucifixion, Christ bears the penalty due to human sin, thereby satisfying divine justice. This atonement provides a universal provision of salvation, which is applied conditionally on the basis of faith and repentance. This understanding of penal substitution became the dominant view in classical Arminianism.

Other Arminians, following Hugo Grotius, argue that reconciliation with God is based on forgiveness made possible through an atonement grounded in the governmental theory. In this approach, Jesus is not strictly punished in the place of human beings. Nevertheless, his sufferings constitute an expiation intended to satisfy the justice of God. This universal provision of forgiveness is likewise applied on the basis of faith in God and repentance from sin. This position later exerted significant influence within Methodism.

Wesley's view of atonement is either understood as a hybrid of penal substitution and the governmental theory, or it is viewed solely as penal substitution. Historically, Wesleyan Arminians have adopted either penal substitution or the governmental theory of atonement.

==== Relational views of reconciliation ====
According to Gustaf Aulén, before Anselm's satisfaction theory, atonement was primarily understood as Christ's victory over enslaving powers rather than as satisfaction made to divine justice. Since the early 20th century, many theologians have rejected these satisfaction-based interpretations, emphasizing instead its interpersonal dimension. They adopted relational models in which reconciliation is grounded in God's sovereignty to forgive the repentant, instead of a juridical transaction. Several contemporary Wesleyan theologians are among them: Dunning adopts the Christus Victor model as his interpretative framework, arguing that the divine-human covenant must be read personally rather than legalistically; similarly, Michael J. Gorman finds inspiration in this framework. William J. Abraham argues that atonement is fundamentally about the restoration of a personal relationship, while Joel B. Green rejects the notion of divine appeasement through atoning sacrifice, viewing it as an obstacle to sanctification.

=== Conversion of man ===
In Arminianism, God initiates the process of salvation by extending his grace, commonly referred to as prevenient grace, to all people. This grace works within each individual, drawing them toward the Gospel and enabling sincere faith, leading to regeneration. It functions through a dynamic influence-and-response relationship, allowing individuals to accept or reject it freely. Thus, conversion is described as a "God-initiated synergism".

=== Justification and sanctification ===
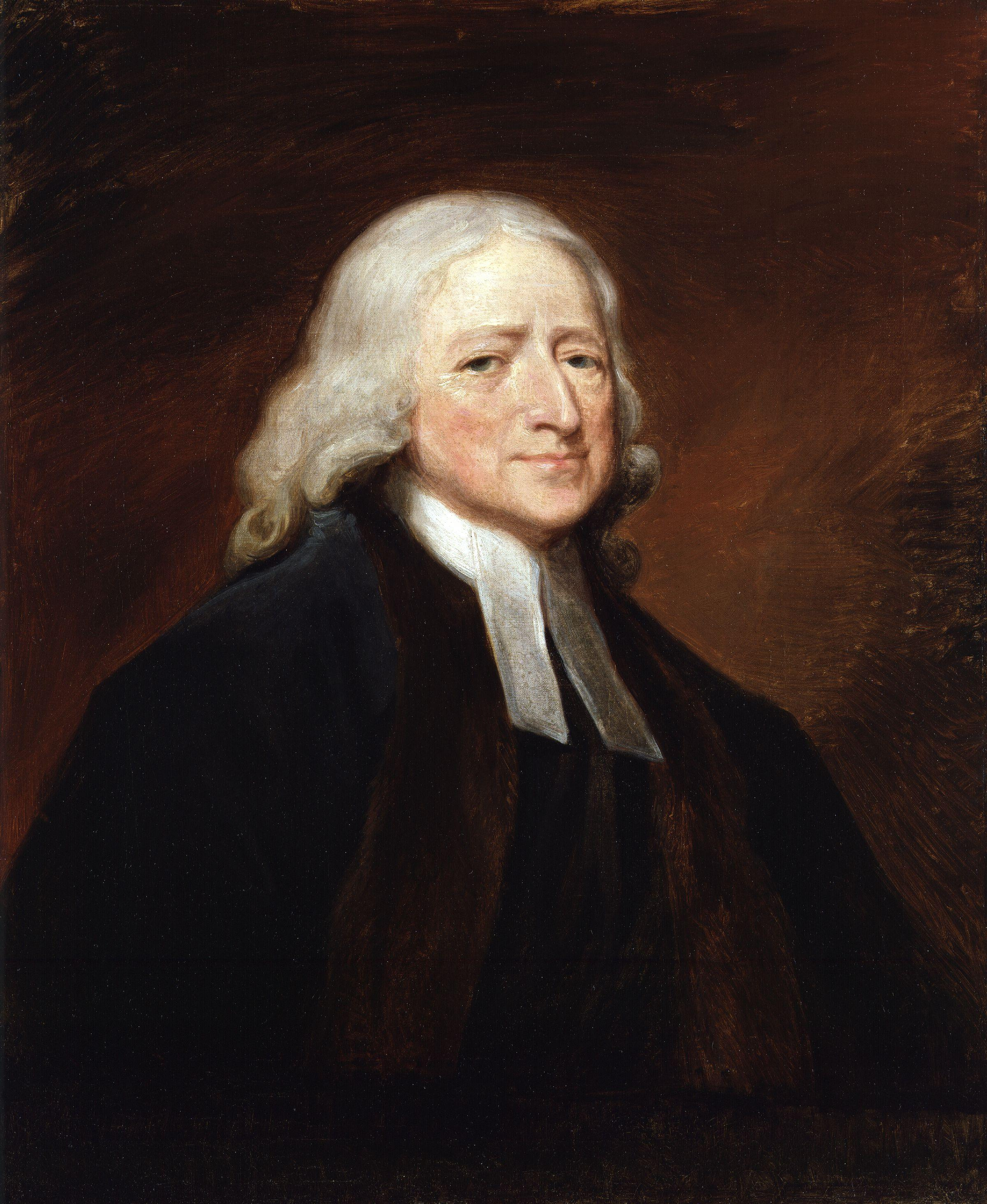
Rommey, George (n.d.). John Wesley.

==== Classical Arminian view ====
In classical Arminian theology, justification is grounded in Christ's imputed righteousness through faith. While not rigidly defined, Arminius view suggests that the righteousness of Christ is attributed to believers, emphasizing that union with Christ transfers his righteousness to them. Arminius understood sanctification as a cooperative work between the Holy Spirit and the believer. Arminius maintained that perfect obedience is theoretically possible through the aid of the Holy Spirit, though he did not claim that it had been attained by anyone other than Christ.

==== Wesleyan Arminian view ====
In Wesleyan theology, justification is understood as the forgiveness of sins rather than being made inherently righteous. Righteousness is achieved through sanctification, which involves the pursuit of holiness in one's life. Wesley taught that imputed righteousness, which refers to the righteousness credited to a believer through faith, must transform into imparted righteousness, where this righteousness becomes evident in the believer's life.

Wesley taught that through the Holy Spirit, Christians could achieve a state of practical perfection, or "entire sanctification", characterized by a lack of voluntary sin. This state involves embodying the love of God and neighbor. It does not mean freedom from all mistakes or temptations, as perfected Christians still need to seek forgiveness and strive for holiness; it is not an absolute perfection.

=== Preservation of man ===
==== Conditional preservation ====
Related to eschatological considerations, Jacobus Arminius taught that hell-fire is the punishment appointed for sin and the transgression of the law. The first Remonstrants, including Simon Episcopius, developed this line of thought further, affirming everlasting fire in which the wicked are cast by God at the final judgment. Building on these themes, Arminianism holds to a position of "conditional preservation," which refers to the divine action of protecting the believer’s relationship with Him against any external influence, while requiring the condition of continued faith on the part of the believer. Nevertheless, although salvation is conditioned on faith, Arminians maintain a present assurance of salvation in Christ.

==== Development of the classical Arminian view on apostasy ====
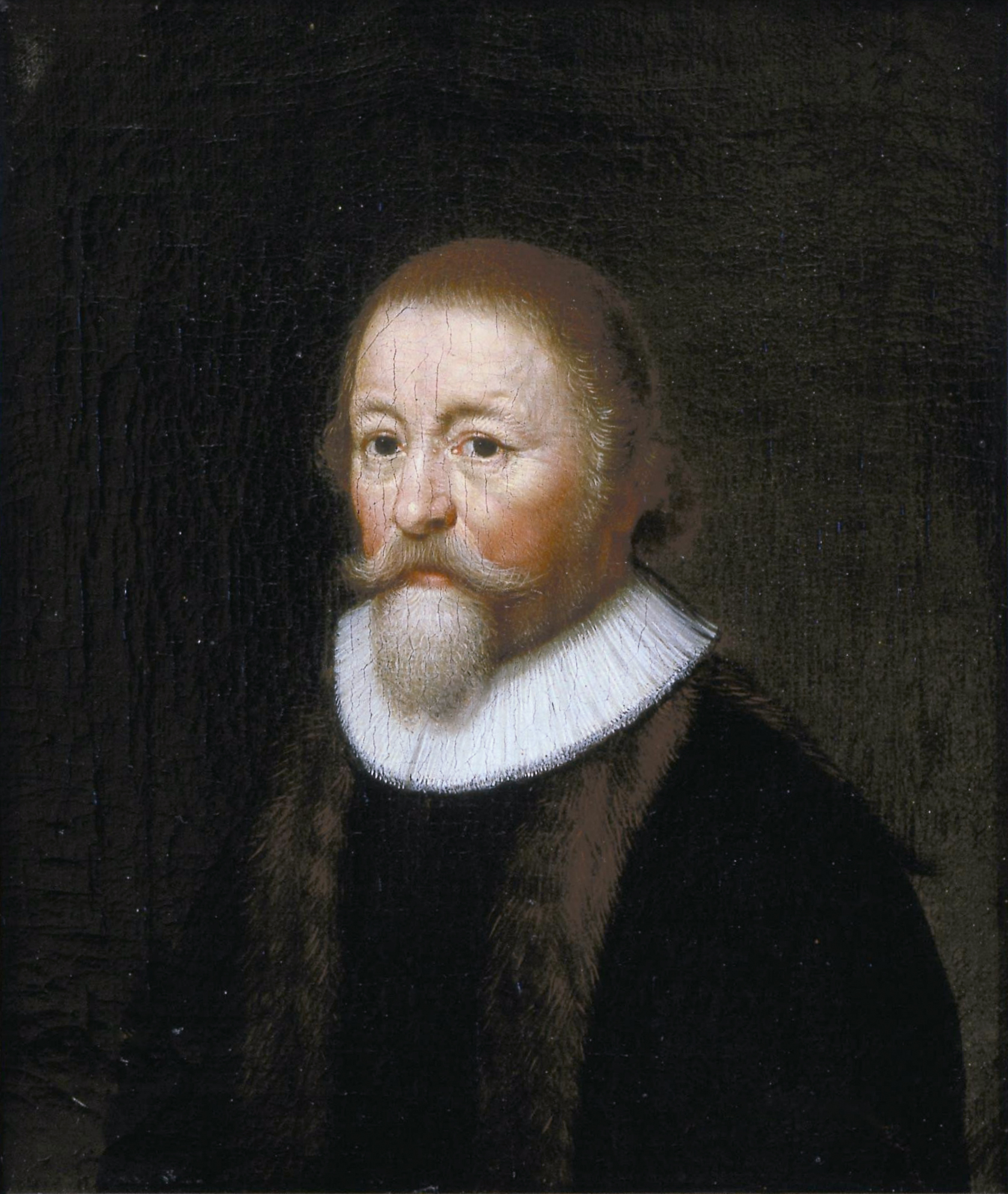
Anonymous (1743). Simon Episcopius.

Arminius believed in the possibility of apostasy. However, over the period of time he wrote on this question, he sometimes expressed himself more cautiously out of consideration for the faith of his readers. In 1599, he stated that the question required more scriptural examination. In his "Declaration of Sentiments" (1608), Arminius said, "I never taught that a true believer can, either totally or finally fall away from the faith, and perish; yet I will not conceal, that there are passages of scripture which seem to me to wear this aspect."

However, Arminius elsewhere expressed certainty about the possibility of falling away: In c. 1602, he noted that a person integrated into the church might resist God's work and that a believer's security rested solely on their choice not to abandon their faith. He argued that God's covenant did not eliminate the possibility of falling away but provided a gift of fear to keep individuals from defecting as long as it thrived in their hearts. He then taught that had David died in sin, he would have been lost. In 1602, Arminius also wrote: "A believing member of Christ may become slothful, give place to sin, and gradually die altogether, ceasing to be a member".

For Arminius, a certain class of sin would cause a believer to fall, especially sin motivated by malice. In 1605, Arminius wrote: "But it is possible for a believer to fall into a mortal sin, as is seen in David. Therefore, he can fall at that moment in which if he were to die, he would be condemned". Scholars observe that Arminius clearly identifies two paths to apostasy 1. "rejection", or 2. "malicious sinning". He suggested that strictly speaking, believers could not directly lose their faith but could cease to believe and thus fall away.

After the death of Arminius in 1609, his followers wrote a Remonstrance (1610) based quite literally on his Declaration of Sentiments (1608), which expressed prudence on the possibility of apostasy. In particular, its fifth article expressed the necessity of further study on the possibility of apostasy. Sometime between 1610 and the official proceeding of the Synod of Dort (1618), the Remonstrants became fully persuaded in their minds that the Scriptures taught that a true believer was capable of falling away from faith and perishing eternally as an unbeliever. They formalized their views in "The Opinion of the Remonstrants" (1618), which was their official stand during the Synod of Dort. They later expressed this same view in the Remonstrant Confession (1621).

Concerning the remediability of apostasy, Arminius maintained that apostasy resulting from "malicious" sin remained forgivable, whereas apostasy arising from a deliberate "rejection" of faith was not. Following Arminius, the Remonstrants held that, although apostasy was possible, it was not ordinarily regarded as irremediable. By contrast, other classical Arminians, including the Free Will Baptists, have regarded apostasy as irrevocable and therefore beyond remedy.

==== Wesleyan view on apostasy ====
Wesley believed that genuine Christians could apostatize. He emphasized that sin alone does not lead to the loss of salvation; instead, prolonged unconfessed sin and deliberate apostasy can result in a permanent fall from grace. Although Wesley acknowledged that some passages of Scripture may suggest that certain cases of apostasy are final and irrecoverable, he ultimately maintained that restoration remains possible in most cases. Accordingly, Wesleyan Arminians generally hold that apostasy remains remediable during earthly life.

==== Four-point Arminianism ====
A position emerged in the 19th century among Calvinist Southern Baptists, who abandoned "perseverance of the saints" in favor of "security of the believer", a term introduced by James Robinson Graves in 1873. Sometimes referred to as "four-point Arminianism," it combines the Arminian view of libertarian free will with the Calvinist concept of perseverance of the saints. A parallel development took place among the Plymouth Brethren, where dispensationalism, rooted in John Nelson Darby's Calvinism and popularized by Dwight L. Moody, reconciled libertarian free will with guaranteed final perseverance. The term "eternal security" was first attested among the Plymouth Brethren in 1913. Within these hybrid theologies, which incorporate a doctrinal form of eternal security, individuals remain free, in the libertarian sense, to choose faith through divine grace, but, once regenerated, regardless of whether they continue to believe or cease to do so, they will inevitably be restored to faith. Critics of this synthesis, primarily Arminian, argue that it is incoherent, because inevitable perseverance undermines libertarian freedom and, in turn, moral responsibility. They also generally regard the accompanying assurance as misplaced.

== Arminianism and other views ==
=== Divergence with Pelagianism ===
Pelagianism is a doctrine denying original sin and total depravity. No system of Arminianism founded on Arminius or Wesley denies original sin or total depravity; both Arminius and Wesley strongly affirmed that man's basic condition is one in which he cannot be righteous, understand God, or seek God. Arminius referred to Pelagianism as "the grand falsehood" and stated that he "must confess that I detest, from my heart, the consequences [of that theology]." This association is considered as libelous when attributed to Arminius's or Wesley's doctrine, and Arminians reject all accusations of Pelagianism.

=== Divergence with Semi-Pelagianism ===
Semi-Pelagianism holds that faith begins with human will, while its continuation and fulfillment depend on God's grace, giving it the label "human-initiated synergism". In contrast, both Classical and Wesleyan Arminianism affirm that prevenient grace from God initiates the process of salvation, a view sometimes referred to as "Semi-Augustinian", or "God-initiated synergism". Following the Reformation, Reformed theologians often categorized both "human-initiated synergism" and "God-initiated synergism" as "Semi-Pelagianism", often leading to mistaken belief that Arminianism aligned with Semi-Pelagianism.

=== Divergence with Calvinism ===
Calvinism and Arminianism, while sharing historical roots and many theological doctrines, diverge most notably on the concepts of divine predestination and election. Some view these differences as fundamental, while others consider them relatively minor distinctions within the broader spectrum of Christian theology.

Regarding human spiritual condition, Arminians agree with Calvinists on the doctrine of total depravity, but differ on how God addresses this condition. Regarding reconciliation with God, whether it is grounded in substitutive expiation or in a more subjective model of atonement, Arminians maintain that reconciliation is offered universally. Accordingly, through prevenient grace, God restores to every person the spiritual capacity to respond to him. Calvinists, by contrast, limit reconciliation to the elect, to whom alone God extends an effectual call.

Arminians affirm a divine providence that permits libertarian free will, whereas Calvinists hold a compatibilist divine determinism, under which God is considered the ultimate cause of everything, including human faith. Consequently, Arminians hold that election to final salvation is conditional on faith, whereas Calvinists consider it unconditional. As a result, Arminians believe that justifying grace is resistible, while Calvinists hold that converting grace is irresistible. Likewise, concerning perseverance, Arminians believe that preservation in final salvation is conditional on faith and can be lost through apostasy, while still affirming present security in Christ against external threats. Calvinists, on the other hand, hold to the perseverance of the saints, maintaining that the elect will persevere in faith until the end of their lives. This doctrine has given rise to two divergent interpretations, one rejecting and the other supporting an absolute assurance of salvation.

=== Divergence with open theism ===
The doctrine of open theism states that God is omnipresent, omnipotent, and omniscient, but differs on the nature of the future. Open theists claim that the future is not completely determined (or "settled") because people have not made their free decisions yet. God therefore knows the future partially in possibilities (human free actions) rather than solely certainties (divinely determined events). Some Arminians reject open theism, viewing it as a distortion of traditional Arminianism. They believe it shifts away from classical Arminianism toward process theology. Others view it as a valid alternative perspective within Christianity, despite not aligning it with Arminian doctrine.

== See also ==
- Apostasy in Christianity
- Covenant theology
- Decisional regeneration
- Free will in theology
- Grace in Christianity
- Justification
- Order of salvation
- Salvation in Christianity
- Synergism

== Notes and references ==
=== Sources ===
- Abasciano, Brian J. (2005). Paul's Use of the Old Testament in Romans 9.1–9: An Intertextual and Theological Exegesis. A&C Black. ISBN 978-0-567-03073-3.
- Abasciano, Brian J. (2009). "Clearing Up Misconceptions about Corporate Election". Ashland Theological Journal. 41.
- Abraham, William J. (2018). "Atonement and the Work of Christ". Divine Agency and Divine Action, Volume III: Systematic Theology. Oxford: Oxford University Press. pp. 84–97. doi:10.1093/oso/9780198786528.003.0007. ISBN 978-0-19-878652-8.
- AG (2017). "Assurance-Of-Salvation: Position paper". AG.
- Akin, James (1993). "A Tiptoe Through Tulip". EWTN.
- Alexander, David; Johnson, Daniel (2016). Calvinism and the Problem of Evil. Eugene, Oregon: Pickwick Publication.
- Arminius, Jacobus (1853a). The Works of James Arminius. Vol. 1. Translated by Nichols, James; Bagnall, W. R. Auburn, New York: Derby, Miller & Orton.
- Arminius, Jacobus (1853b). The Works of James Arminius. Vol. 2. Translated by Nichols, James; Bagnall, W. R. Auburn, New York: Derby & Miller.
- Arminius, Jacobus (1853c). The Works of James Arminius. Vol. 3. Translated by Nichols, James; Bagnall, W. R. Auburn, New York: Derby & Miller.
- Aulen, Gustaf (2003). Christus Victor: An Historical Study of the Three Main Types of the Idea of Atonement. Eugene, OR: Wipf and Stock.
- Bangs, Carl (1960). "Arminius: An Anniversary Report". Christianity Today. 5.
- Bangs, Carl (1985). Arminius: A Study in the Dutch Reformation. Eugene, Oregon: Wipf & Stock.
- Barrett, Matthew (2013). Salvation by Grace: The Case for Effectual Calling and Regeneration. Phillipsburg: P & R Publishing.
- Barth, Markus (1974). Ephesians. Garden City, New Jersey: Doubleday. ISBN 978-0-385-08037-8.
- Bender, Harold S. (1953). "Arminianism". Global Anabaptist Mennonite Encyclopedia Online.
- Bounds, Christopher. T. (2011). "How are People Saved? The Major Views of Salvation with a Focus on Wesleyan Perspectives and their Implications". Wesley and Methodist Studies. 3: 31–54. doi:10.5325/weslmethstud.3.2011.0031. JSTOR 42909800. S2CID 171804441.
- Brümmer, Vincent (December 1992). "Atonement and Reconciliation". Religious Studies. 28 (4). Cambridge University Press: 435–452. JSTOR 20019569.
- Cameron, Charles M. (1992). "Arminius–Hero or heretic?" (PDF). Evangelical Quarterly. 64 (3): 213–227. doi:10.1163/27725472-06403003. S2CID 252237177.
- Cross, F. L. (2005). The Oxford dictionary of the Christian church. New York: Oxford University Press.
- Davis, John Jefferson (1991). "The Perseverance of the Saints: A History of the Doctrine" (PDF). Journal of the Evangelical Theological Society. 34 (2).
- De Jong, Peter (1968). "The Opinions of the Remonstrants (1618)". Crisis in the Reformed Churches: Essays in Commemoration of the Great Synod of Dordt, 1618–1619. Grand Rapids, Michigan: Reformed Fellowship.
- Delumeau, Jean; Wanegffelen, Thierry; Cottret, Bernard (2012). "Chapitre XII: Les conflits internes du protestantisme". Naissance et affirmation de la Réforme (in French). Paris: Presses Universitaires de France.
- Demarest, Bruce A. (1997). The Cross and Salvation: The Doctrine of Salvation. Crossway Books. ISBN 978-0-89107-937-8.
- Denzinger, Henricus (1954). Enchiridion Symbolorum et Definitionum (30th ed.). Freiburg im Breisgau: Herder.
- Dorner, Isaak A. (2004). History of Protestant Theology. Eugene, Oregon: Wipf & Stock.
- Driscoll, Mark (2013). A Call to Resurgence: Will Christianity Have a Funeral or a Future?. Tyndale House. ISBN 978-1-4143-8907-3.
- Dunning, H. Ray (1988). Grace, Faith & Holiness: A Wesleyan Systematic Theology. Kansas City, Missouri: Beacon Hill Press of Kansas City. ISBN 978-0-8341-1219-3.
- Dunning, H. Ray (2005). "Toward a Personal Paradigm for the Atonement" (PDF). Wesleyan Theological Journal. 40 (2): 157–168.
- Elwell, Walter A. (2001). Evangelical Dictionary of Theology. Grand Rapids, MI: Baker Publishing Group. ISBN 9781441200303.
- Episcopius, Simon; Ellis, Mark A. (2005). "Introduction" (PDF). The Arminian confession of 1621. Eugene, Oregon: Pickwick Publications.
- Forlines, F. Leroy (2001). The Quest for Truth: Answering Life's Inescapable Questions. Randall House Publications. ISBN 978-0-89265-962-3.
- Forlines, F. Leroy (2011). Pinson, J. Matthew (ed.). Classical Arminianism: A Theology of Salvation. Randall House. ISBN 978-0-89265-607-3.
- Gann, Gerald (2014). "Arminius on Apostasy". The Arminian Magazine. 32 (2): 5–6.
- Garrett, James Leo; Hinson, E. Glenn; Tull (1983). Are Southern Baptists "Evangelicals"?. Macon, GA: Mercer University Press.
- Gause, R. Hollis (2007). Living in the Spirit: The Way of Salvation. Cleveland, Ohio: CPT Press.
- Gonzalez, Justo L. (2014). The Story of Christianity. Vol. 2: The Reformation to the Present Day. HarperOne. ISBN 978-0-06-236490-6.
- Gorman, Michael J. (2014). The Death of the Messiah and the Birth of the New Covenant: A New Covenant Model of Atonement. Eugene, OR: Cascade Books.
- Green, Joel B. (2008). "Must We Imagine the Atonement in Penal Substitutionary Terms?". In Tidball, Derek; Hilborn, David; Thacker, Justin (eds.). The Atonement Debate. Grand Rapids, MI: Zondervan.
- Grider, J. Kenneth (1982). "The Nature of Wesleyan Theology" (PDF). Wesleyan Theological Journal. 17 (2): 43–57.
- Grider, J. Kenneth (1994). A Wesleyan Holiness Theology. Kansas City, MO: Beacon Hill Press of Kansas City.
- Grudem, Wayne (1994). Systematic Theology. Grand Rapids, Michigan: IVP.
- Guggisberg, Hans R.; Gordon, Bruce (2017). Sebastian Castellio, 1515–1563: Humanist and Defender of Religious Toleration in a Confessional Age. Oxon: Taylor & Francis.
- Gunter, William Stephen (2007). "John Wesley, a Faithful Representative of Jacobus Arminius" (PDF). Wesleyan Theological Journal. 42 (2): 65–82.
- Harmon, Richard W. (1984). Baptists and Other Denominations. Nashville, Tennessee: Convention Press.
- Heron, Alasdair I. C. (1999). "Arminianism". In Fahlbusch, Erwin (ed.). Encyclopedia of Christianity. Vol. 1. Grand Rapids, Michigan: Wm. B. Eerdmans. pp. 128–129.
- James, Frank A. (1998). Peter Martyr Vermigli and Predestination: The Augustinian Inheritance of an Italian Reformer. Oxford: Clarendon.
- Kang, Paul ChulHong (2006). Justification: The Imputation of Christ's Righteousness from Reformation Theology to the American Great Awakening and the Korean Revivals. New York: Peter Lang. ISBN 978-0-8204-8605-5.
- Keathley, Kenneth D. (2010). Salvation and Sovereignty: A Molinist Approach. Nashville: B&H Publishing Group.
- Keathley, Kenneth D. (2014). "Ch 12. The Work of God: Salvation". In Akin, Daniel L. (ed.). A Theology for the Church. B&H. ISBN 978-1-4336-8214-8.
- Keefer, Luke (1987). "Characteristics of Wesley's Arminianism" (PDF). Wesleyan Theological Journal. 22 (1): 87–99.
- Kirkpatrick, Daniel (2018). Monergism or Synergism: Is Salvation Cooperative or the Work of God Alone?. Eugene, Oregon: Pickwick Publication.
- Knight, Henry H. (2010). From Aldersgate to Azusa Street: Wesleyan, Holiness, and Pentecostal Visions. Eugene, Oregon: Wipf & Stock.
- Knight, Henry H. (2018). John Wesley: Optimist of Grace. Eugene, Oregon: Wipf & Stock.
- Lange, Lyle W. (2005). God So Loved the World: A Study of Christian Doctrine. Milwaukee, Wisconsin: Northwestern Publishing House. ISBN 978-0-8100-1744-3.
- Lehman, Chester K. (1956). "Eternal Security". The Mennonite Encyclopedia: A Comprehensive Reference Work on the Anabaptist-Mennonite Movement. Vol. 2. Scottsdale: Mennonite Publishing House.
- Leonard, Bill J. (1990). God's Last and Only Hope: The Fragmentation of the Southern Baptist Convention. Grand Rapids, MI: W.B. Eerdmans.
- Levering, Matthew (2011). Predestination: Biblical and Theological Paths. New York: Oxford University Press. ISBN 978-0-19-960452-4.
- Loughlin, James Francis (1907). "Arminianism" . Catholic Encyclopedia. Vol. 1.
- Luther, Martin (1823). Martin Luther on the Bondage of the Will: Written in Answer to the Diatribe of Erasmus on Free-will. First Pub. in the Year of Our Lord 1525. Translated by Cole, Henry. London: T. Bensley.
- MacCulloch, Diarmaid (1990). The Later Reformation in England 1547–1603. New York: Macmillan International Higher Education.
- MacCulloch, Diarmaid (2009). A History of Christianity: The First Three Thousand Years. Allen Lane. ISBN 978-0-7139-9869-6.
- Magnusson, Magnus, ed. (1995). Chambers Biographical Dictionary. Chambers – via Cambridge University Press.
- Marberry, Thomas (1998). ""Matthew" in the IVP New Testament Commentary Series By Craig S. Keener". Contact: Official Publication of the National Association of Free Will Baptists. Vol. 45. The Association.
- Marko, Jonathan S. (2020). "Grace, Early Modern Discussion of". In Jalobeanu, Dana; Wolfe, Charles T. (eds.). Encyclopedia of Early Modern Philosophy and the Sciences. Cham: Springer International Publishing. ISBN 978-3-319-20791-9.
- Marsden, George M. (1982). Fundamentalism and American Culture: The Shaping of Twentieth Century Evangelicalism, 1870-1925. Oxford: Oxford University Press. ISBN 978-0-19-503083-9.
- McClintock, John; Strong, James (1880). "Arminianism". The Cyclopedia of Biblical, Theological, and Ecclesiastical Literature. New York: Harper and Brothers.
- Mcgonigle, Herbert (2001). Sufficient Saving Grace. Carlisle: Paternoster. ISBN 1-84227-045-1.
- Moody, Dale (1990). The Word of Truth: A Summary of Christian Doctrine Based on Biblical Revelation. Grand Rapids: Wm. B. Eerdmans Publishing.
- More, Ellen (1982). "John Goodwin and the Origins of the New Arminianism". Journal of British Studies. 22 (1). Cambridge University Press: 50–70. doi:10.1086/385797. JSTOR 175656.
- Muller, Richard A. (2012). Calvin and the Reformed Tradition: On the Work of Christ and the Order of Salvation. Baker Books. ISBN 978-1-4412-4254-9.
- Oakley, Francis (1988). The Medieval Experience: Foundations of Western Cultural Singularity. Toronto: University of Toronto Press.
- Oden, Thomas (2012). John Wesley's Teachings. Vol. 2. Grand Rapids, MI: Zondervan Academic.
- Olson, Roger E. (1999). The Story of Christian Theology: Twenty Centuries of Tradition & Reform. Downers Grove, IL: InterVarsity Press. ISBN 9780830815050.
- Olson, Roger E. (2004). The Westminster handbook to evangelical theology. Louisville, KY: Westminster John Knox Press.
- Olson, Roger E. (2008). "The Classical Free Will Theist Model of God". In Ware, Bruce (ed.). Perspectives on the Doctrine of God: Four Views. Nashville, TN: B&H Publishing Group.
- Olson, Roger E. (2009). Arminian Theology: Myths and Realities. Downers Grove, Illinois: InterVarsity Press.
- Olson, Roger E. (2010). "One more quick sidebar about clarifying Arminianism". Roger E. Olson: My evangelical, Arminian theological musings. Patheos.
- Olson, Roger E. (2012). "My List of "Approved Denominations"". Roger E. Olson: My evangelical, Arminian theological musings.
- Olson, Roger E. (2013a). "What's Wrong with Calvinism?". Roger E. Olson: My evangelical, Arminian theological musings. Patheos.
- Olson, Roger E. (2013b). "Must One Agree with Arminius to be Arminian?". Roger E. Olson: My evangelical, Arminian theological musings. Patheos.
- Olson, Roger E. (2014). Arminianism FAQ: Everything You Always Wanted to Know. Franklin, Tennessee: Seebed. ISBN 978-1-62824-162-4.
- Olson, Roger E. (2018). "Calvinism and Arminianism Compared". Roger E. Olson: My evangelical, Arminian theological musings. Patheos.
- Oropeza, B. J. (2000). Paul and Apostasy: Eschatology, Perseverance, and Falling Away in the Corinthian Congregation. Tübingen: Mohr Siebeck..
- Osborne, Grant R.; Trueman, Carl R.; Hammett, John S. (2015). Perspectives on the Extent of the Atonement: 3 views. Nashville, Tennessee: B & H Academic. ISBN 9781433669712. OCLC 881665298.
- Pawson, David (1996). Once Saved, Always Saved? A Study in Perseverance and Inheritance. London: Hodder & Stoughton. ISBN 0-340-61066-2.
- Peterson, Robert A.; Williams, Michael D. (2004). Why I am not an Arminian. Downers Grove, IL: Intervarsity Press. ISBN 0-8308-3248-3.
- Picirilli, Robert (2002). Grace, Faith, Free Will: Contrasting Views of Salvation. Nashville, Tennessee: Randall House. ISBN 0-89265-648-4.
- Pickar, C. H. (1981) [1967]. The New Catholic Encyclopedia. Vol. 5. Washington, DC: McGraw-Hill.
- Pinson, J. Matthew (2002). Four Views on Eternal Security. Grand Rapids, Michigan: Harper Collins.
- Pinson, J. Matthew (2003). "Will the Real Arminius Please Stand Up? A Study of the Theology of Jacobus Arminius in Light of His Interpreters" (PDF). Integrity: A Journal of Christian Thought. 2: 121–139.
- Pinson, J. Matthew (2011). "Thomas Grantham's Theology Of The Atonement And Justification" (PDF). Journal for Baptist Theology & Ministry. 8 (1): 7–21.
- Pokki, Timo (1999). America's Preacher and His Message: Billy Graham's View of Conversion and Sanctification. Lanham: University Press of America.
- Puchniak, Robert (2008). "Pelagius: Kierkegaard's use of Pelagius and Pelagianism". Kierkegaard and the Patristic and Medieval Traditions. Farnham: Ashgate Publishing. ISBN 978-0-7546-6391-1.
- Reasoner, Vic (2000). "An Arminian Covenant Theology". Arminian Magazine. 18 (2). Fundamental Wesleyan Publishers.
- Ridderbos, Herman (1997). Paul: An Outline of His Theology. Wm. B. Eerdmans. ISBN 978-0-8028-4469-9.
- Rogers, Katherin (2004). "Augustine's Compatibilism". Religious Studies. 40 (4): 415–435. doi:10.1017/S003441250400722X.
- Rogers, Ronnie W. (2022). If Only You Would Ask: Praying God’s Conditional Promises. Eugene, OR: Wipf & Stock.
- Rupp, Ernest Gordon; Watson, Philip Saville (1969). Luther and Erasmus: Free Will and Salvation. Louisville, Kentucky: Westminster John Knox Press. ISBN 978-0-664-24158-2.
- Sanders, John (30 July 2007). "An introduction to open theism". Reformed Review. 60 (2).
- Sayer, M. James (2006). The Survivor's Guide to Theology. Grand Rapids, MI: Zondervan.
- SBC (2000). "The Baptist Faith and Message". Southern Baptist Convention.
- Schaff, Philip (1997). History of the Christian Church. Vol. 3. Oak Harbor, WA: Logos Research Systems.
- Schaff, Philip (2007). The Creeds of Christendom. Vol. 3. Grand Rapids, Michigan: Baker Books. ISBN 978-0-8010-8232-0.
- Schwartz, William Andrew; Bechtold, John M. (2015). Embracing the Past—Forging the Future: A New Generation of Wesleyan Theology. Eugene, Oregon: Wipf & Stock.
- Smith, Damian J. (2010). Crusade, Heresy and Inquisition in the Lands of the Crown of Aragon: (c. 1167 - 1276). Leiden: Brill.
- Stanglin, Keith D. (2007). Arminius on the Assurance of Salvation. Boston, Massachusetts: Brill.
- Stanglin, Keith D.; Muller, Richard A. (2009). "Bibliographia Arminiana: A Comprehensive, Annotated Bibliography of the Works of Arminius". Arminius, Arminianism, and Europe. Boston, Massachusetts: Brill. pp. 263–290.
- Stanglin, Keith D.; McCall, Thomas H. (15 November 2012). Jacob Arminius: Theologian of Grace. New York: Oxford University Press USA. ISBN 978-0-19-975567-7.
- Stanglin, Keith D.; McCall, Thomas H. (2021). After Arminius: A Historical Introduction to Arminian Theology. New York: Oxford University Press.
- Stegall, Thomas Lewis (2009). The Gospel of the Christ: A Biblical Response to the Crossless Gospel Regarding the Contents of Saving Faith. Milwaukee: Grace Gospel Press.
- Studebaker, Steven M. (2008). Defining Issues in Pentecostalism: Classical and Emergent. Euguene, OR: Wipf and Stock Publishers.
- Sutton, Jerry (2012). "Anabaptism and James Arminius: A Study in Soteriological Kinship and Its Implications" (PDF). Midwestern Journal of Theology. 11 (2): 121–139.
- Teselle, Eugene (2014). "The Background: Augustine and the Pelagian Controversy". In Hwang, Alexander Y.; Matz, Brian J.; Casiday, Augustine (eds.). Grace for Grace: The Debates after Augustine and Pelagius. Washington, D.C.: Catholic University of America Press. pp. 1–13. ISBN 978-0-8132-2601-9.
- Thorsen, Don (2007). An Exploration of Christian Theology. Grand Rapids, Michigan: Baker Books.
- Torbet, Robert George (1963). A History of the Baptists (3rd ed.). Judson Press.
- Tyacke, Nicholas (1990). Anti-Calvinists: the rise of English Arminianism, c. 1590–1640. Oxford: Clarendon. ISBN 978-0-19-820184-7.
- Vickers, Jason E. (2009). Wesley: A Guide for the Perplexed. London: T & T Clark.
- Wallace, Dewey D. (2011). Shapers of English Calvinism, 1660–1714: Variety, Persistence, and Transformation. Oxford University Press.
- Walls, Jerry L.; Dongell, Joseph R. (2004). Why I Am Not a Calvinist. Downers Grove, Illinois: InterVarsity Press. ISBN 0-8308-3249-1.
- Wesley, John (1827). The Works of the Rev. John Wesley. Vol. 8. New York: J.& J. Harper.
- Wesley, John; Emory, John (1835). The Works of the Late Reverend John Wesley. Vol. 2. New York: B. Waugh and T. Mason.
- Wiley, H. Orton (1941). Christian theology. Vol. 2. Kansas City, MO: Beacon Hill Press.
- Wilson, Andrew J. (2017). The Warning-Assurance Relationship in 1 Corinthians. Tübingen: Mohr Siebeck.
- Witzki, Steve (2010). "The Arminian Confession of 1621 and Apostasy". Society of Evangelical Arminians.
- Wood, Darren Cushman (2007). "John Wesley's Use of the Atonement". The Asbury Journal. 62 (2): 55–70.
- Wynkoop, Mildred Bangs (1967). Foundations of Wesleyan-Arminian Theology. Kansas City, Missouri: Beacon Hill Press.
