= Roger E. Olson =

American theologian and academic

The Reverend Roger E. Olson
- Born: Roger Eugene Olson; February 2, 1952 (age 74); Des Moines, Iowa, US
- Spouse: Becky Sandahl (m. 1973)

Ecclesiastical career
- Religion: Christianity (Pentecostal · Baptist)
- Ordained: 1975

Academic background
- Education: North American Baptist Seminary; Rice University
- Alma mater: Rice University
- Thesis: Trinity and Eschatology (1984)
- Doctoral advisor: Niels Nielsen
- Influences: Donald G. Bloesch; Robert Jenson; Jürgen Moltmann; Bernard Ramm; Jack Rogers

Academic work
- Discipline: Theology
- Sub-discipline: Christian ethics
- School or tradition: Arminianism; Baptism; evangelicalism
- Institutions: Oral Roberts University; Bethel College; Baylor University
- Website: patheos.com/blogs/rogereolson

Roger Eugene Olson (born 1952) is an American theologian and Professor of Christian Theology of Ethics at Baylor University.

== Biography ==
=== Personal life ===
Olson was born on February 2, 1952, in Des Moines, Iowa. He is married and he and his wife have two daughters and one granddaughter. He is a member of Calvary Baptist Church in Waco.

=== Education ===
Olson studied at Open Bible College in Des Moines, North American Baptist Seminary, and Rice University, where he obtained his Ph.D. in Religious Studies in 1984, under the supervision of Nields Nielsen. He is also an ordained Baptist minister.

He was influenced by Donald G. Bloesch, Robert Jenson, Jürgen Moltmann, Bernard Ramm, and Jack Rogers.

=== Career ===
Since 1999, Olson has been Holder of the Foy Valentine Professor of Christian Theology of Ethics at George W. Truett Theological Seminary of Baylor University, Waco, Texas. Olson retired in December 2021.

== Theological contribution ==
=== Advocacy of Arminianism ===
Olson identifies himself as a classical Arminian, and is known for his stance in favor of Arminianism. He has written several books including Arminian Theology: Myths and Realities (2006) in which he defined and defended his vision of Arminianism. Olson fundamentally defines Arminianism by God's "limited" mode of providence and by God's "predestination by foreknowledge" mode of election.

According to him, adherence to classical Arminianism is defined by being classically Protestant, affirming total depravity, conditional election, unlimited atonement, prevenient grace, and that God is in no way, and by no means, the author of sin and evil but that these are only permitted by him. Olson's definition, without taking a position on the conditional preservation, is close to the view of the Remonstrants prior to 1618.

For Olson, "classical Arminianism" as defined is centered on God's grace and sovereignty, and is intrinsically an evangelical theology. Olson also refers to "classical Arminianism" as "evangelical synergism": 'synergism' referring to cooperation between God and creature and 'evangelical' to distinguish it from Catholic or Eastern Orthodox synergism.

Olson says that the first principle of Arminianism is "Jesus Christ as the full and perfect revelation of the character of God". This principle has a particular significance within the Calvinism–Armininian debate, where the character of God (and especially his love) as revealed by Jesus Christ is, for Olson, better represented by the Arminian view. Olson says that, as a consequence of this point, Arminians only believe in libertarian free will to avoid making God the author of sin and evil, and because it is an experienced reality necessary for responsibility.

=== Theology history and analysis ===
Olson wrote a popular and widely acclaimed survey of Christian theology titled The Story of Christian Theology (1999).

He is noted for a broad view of what constitutes Protestant "orthodoxy." For example, on annihilationism he commented in his 2002 book The Mosaic of Christian Belief that some evangelical theologians have "resurrected the old polemical labels of heresy and aberrational teaching" in order to marginalize other evangelicals holding the view.

Olson has described two "loose coalitions" developing within evangelical theology in response to postmodernism, which he referred to as "Traditionalists" and "Reformists."

Olson coined the label "Pannenberg's Principle" for Wolfhart Pannenberg's argument (1969) that God's deity is his rule – "The divinity of God and the reign of God in the world are inseparable."

He was the editor and author of the Handbook of Denominations in the United States, 14th edition (2018).

== Bibliography ==
=== Books ===
- Olson, Roger E. (1984). Trinity and eschatology : the historical being of God in the theology of Wolfhart Pannenberg (Ph. D). Houston, TX: Rice University.
- Grenz, Stanley J.; Olson, Roger E. (1992). 20th-Century Theology: God and the World in a Transitional Age. Downers Grove, IL: InterVarsity Press.
- Grenz, Stanley J.; Olson, Roger E. (1996). Who Needs Theology?: An Invitation to the Study of God's Word. Downers Grove, IL: InterVarsity Press.
- Olson, Roger E. (1999). The Story of Christian Theology: Twenty Centuries of Tradition & Reform. Downers Grove, IL: InterVarsity Press. ISBN 9780830815050.
- Olson, Roger E. (2002). The Mosaic of Christian Beliefs: Twenty Centuries of Unity & Diversity. Downers Grove, IL: InterVarsity Press.
- Olson, Roger E.; Hall, Christopher A. (2002). The Trinity. Grand Rapids, MI: William B. Eerdmans Publishing Company.
- Olson, Roger E. (2004). The Westminster handbook to evangelical theology. Louisville, KY: Westminster John Knox Press.
- Olson, Roger E.; English, Adam C. (2005). Pocket History of Theology. Downers Grove, IL: InterVarsity Press.
- Olson, Roger E. (2005). The SCM Press A-Z of evangelical theology. London: SCM.
- Olson, Roger E. (2006). Arminian Theology: Myths And Realities. Downers Grove, IL: IVP Academic.
- Olson, Roger E. (2007). Pocket history of evangelical theology. Downers Grove, IL: InterVarsity Press.
- Olson, Roger E. (2007). Reformed and always reforming : the postconservative approach to evangelical theology. Grand Rapids, MI: Baker Academic.
- Olson, Roger E. (2007). Questions to all your answers : a journey from folk religion to examined faith. Grand Rapids, MI: Zondervan.
- Olson, Roger E. (2008). How to Be Evangelical without Being Conservative. Grand Rapids, MI: Zondervan.
- Olson, Roger E. (2009). Finding God in The shack : seeking truth in a story of evil and redemption. Downers Grove, IL: IVP Books.
- Olson, Roger E. (2009). God in Dispute: "Conversations" among Great Christian Thinkers. Grand Rapids, MI: Baker Academic.
- Olson, Roger E. (2011a). Against Calvinism. Grand Rapids, MI: Zondervan.
- Olson, Roger E. (2013). The Journey of Modern Theology: From Reconstruction to Deconstruction. Downers Grove, IL: IVP Academic.
- Olson, Roger E. (2014a). Arminianism FAQ: Everything You Always Wanted to Know. [Franklin, TE]: Seedbed Publishing.
- Olson, Roger E.; Collins Winn, Christian T. (2015). Reclaiming pietism : retrieving an evangelical tradition. Grand Rapids, MI: William B. Eerdmans Publishing Company.
- Olson, Roger E. (2015). Counterfeit Christianity : the persistence of errors in the church. Nashville, TN: Abingdon Press.
- Olson, Roger E. (2017). The Essence of Christian Thought : Seeing Reality Through the Biblical Story. Grand Rapids, MI: Zondervan.
- Olson, Roger E.; Mead, Franck S. (2018b). Handbook of denominations in the United States (14th ed.). Nashville, TN: Abingdon Press.

=== Articles ===
- Olson, Roger E. (1990). "The Creative Suffering of God. By Paul S. Fiddes. Oxford, Clarendon Press, 1988. Pp. 281. £29.50". Scottish Journal of Theology. 43 (1): 114–115. doi:10.1017/S0036930600039727. S2CID 170795919.
- Olson, Roger E. (1992). "Metaphysics and the Idea of God . Wolfhart Pannenberg, Philip Clayton". The Journal of Religion. 72 (2): 285–286. doi:10.1086/488878.
- Olson, Roger E. (1995). "Whales and Elephants Both God's Creatures but can They Meet?: Evangelicals and Liberals in Dialogue". Pro Ecclesia: A Journal of Catholic and Evangelical Theology. 72 (2): 165–189. doi:10.1177/106385129500400206. S2CID 220286351.
- Olson, Roger E.; Fackre, Gabriel (1999). "FEATURES - Evangelical essentials? Reservations and reminders - Summing up the gospel". The Christian Century. 116 (23): 816.
- Olson, Roger E. (2001). "The Barthian Revolt in Modern Theology: Theology Without Weapons. By Gary Dorrien. Louisville, KY: Westminster John Knox Press, 1999. Pp. 239. $29.95". Scottish Journal of Theology. 54 (2): 260–263. doi:10.1017/S0036930600051498. S2CID 170800917.
- Olson, Roger E. (2001). "BOOK NOTES - The Story of Christian Theology: Twenty Centuries of Tradition and Reform". Theology Today. 58 (2): 276.
- Olson, Roger E.; Augsburger, Daniel (2002). "BOOK REVIEWS AND NOTES - The Story of Theology: Twenty Centuries of Tradition and Reform". Church History. 71 (2): 446.
- Olson, Roger E. (2003). "Tensions in Evangelical Theology". Dialog: A Journal of Theology. 42 (1): 76–85.
- Olson, Roger E. (2003). "The Tradition Temptation". Christianity Today.
- Olson, Roger E. (2004). "Christology: A Global Introduction By Veli-Matti Kärkkäinen Grand Rapids, Baker Academic, 2003. 300 pp. $21.99". Theology Today. 60 (4): 580–581. doi:10.1177/004057360406000422. S2CID 170214333.
- Olson, Roger E. (2005). "Alan P. F. Sell, Confessing and Commending the Faith: Historic Witness and Apologetic Method (Cardiff: University of Wales Press, 2002), pp. 550". Scottish Journal of Theology. 58 (3): 358–360. doi:10.1017/S0036930605241558. S2CID 170588495.
- Olson, Roger E. (2006b). "PENTECOSTALISM - Pentecostalism's dark side - Suspicions and scandals". The Christian Century. 123 (5): 276.
- Olson, Roger E. (2007). "Deification in Contemporary Theology". Theology Today. 64 (2): 186–200. doi:10.1177/004057360706400205. S2CID 170904062.
- Olson, Roger E. (2009). "'Theology' after 'God' - A conversation". The Christian Century. 36 (25): 32.
- Olson, Roger E. (2012). "Predestination: The American Career of A Contentious Doctrine - By Peter J. Thuesen". Religious Studies Review. 38 (2): 81–82. doi:10.1111/j.1748-0922.2012.01596_31.x.
- Olson, Roger E. (2012). "Pietism and Pentecostalism: Spiritual Cousins or Competitors?". Pneuma. 34 (3): 319–344. doi:10.1163/15700747-12341235.

== Notes and references ==
=== Sources ===
- Baylor (March 11, 2022). "Baylor University's Truett Seminary Appoints Dr. Daniel Lee Hill as Assistant Professor of Christian Theology". Baylor University.
- De Jong, Peter (1968). "The Opinions of the Remonstrants (1618)". Crisis in the Reformed Churches: Essays in Commemoration of the Great Synod of Dordt, 1618-1619 (PDF). Grand Rapids: Reformed Fellowship.
- Grenz, Stanley James (2001). The social God and the relational self : a trinitarian theology of the imago dei 7. Berrien Springs, MI: Westminster John Knox Press.
- Kirkpatrick, James (2018). Monergism or Synergism: Is Salvation Cooperative or the Work of God Alone?. Eugene, OR: Wipf and Stock Publishers.
- Knight, George R. (2003). Seventh-Day Adventists answer questions on doctrine. Berrien Springs, MI: Andrews University Press.
- McWilliams, Warren (2018). "Review of The Mosaic of Christian Belief: Twenty Centuries of Unity and Diversity (2nd ed.), by Roger E. Olson" (PDF). Journal for Baptist Theology and Ministry. 15 (1): 137–140.
- Olson, Roger E. (2010a). "One more quick sidebar about clarifying Arminianism". Roger E. Olson: My evangelical, Arminian theological musings. Patheos.
- Olson, Roger E. (2010b). "Open theism: a test case for evangelicals". Roger E. Olson: My evangelical, Arminian theological musings. Patheos.
- Olson, Roger E. (2010c). "Diversity of Calvinism/Reformed theology". Roger E. Olson: My evangelical, Arminian theological musings. Patheos.
- Olson, Roger E. (2010d). "Arminian theology is evangelical theology (long)". Roger E. Olson: My evangelical, Arminian theological musings. Patheos.
- Olson, Roger E. (2010e). "Arminianism is God-centered theology". Roger E. Olson: My evangelical, Arminian theological musings. Patheos.
- Olson, Roger E. (2011b). "Some Thoughts About Fathers on Fathers Day". Roger E. Olson: My Evangelical Arminian Theologian Musings. Patheos.
- Olson, Roger E. (2013a). "What's Wrong with Calvinism?". Roger E. Olson: My evangelical, Arminian theological musings. Patheos.
- Olson, Roger E. (2014b). "Wolfhart Pannenberg R.I.P." Roger E. Olson: My Evangelical Arminian Theologian Musings. Patheos.
- Olson, Roger E. (2014c). "Theologians I Have Known: Reflections on Their Personalities Part 1". Roger E. Olson: My Evangelical Arminian Theologian Musings. Patheos.
- Olson, Roger E. (2017a). "Arminianism Is Grace-Centered Theology". Roger E. Olson: My evangelical, Arminian theological musings. Patheos.
- Olson, Roger E. (2017b). "American Lutheran Theologians I Have Known". Roger E. Olson: My Evangelical Arminian Theologian Musings. Patheos.
- Olson, Roger E. (2018a). "Curriculum vitae" (PDF). Baylor University.
- Olson, Roger E. (2018c). "Calvinism and Arminianism Compared". Roger E. Olson: My evangelical, Arminian theological musings. Patheos.
- Olson, Roger E. (2019a). "A Great Evangelical Theologian to Read: Donald G. Bloesch". Roger E. Olson: My Evangelical Arminian Theologian Musings. Patheos.
- Olson, Roger E. (2019b). "The Key Difference Between Conservative and Postconservative Evangelicals". Roger E. Olson: My Evangelical Arminian Theologian Musings. Patheos.
- Stanglin, Keith D.; McCall, Thomas H. (2021). After Arminius: A Historical Introduction to Arminian Theology. New York: Oxford University Press.
- Thorsen, Don (2009). "A Review Essay: Olson's Arminian Theology". Catalyst.
- Toulouse, Mark G. (2006). God in public : four ways American Christianity and public life relate. Louisville: Westminster John Knox Press.
