= Remonstrant Confession =

Remonstrant creed

The Confession or Declaration of the Pastors which are called Remonstrants, or Remonstrant Confession, was the confession of faith of the Remonstrant brotherhood, published in 1621.

== Historical context ==
By the decrees of the Synod of Dort, the church services of the Remonstrants were prohibited. They united in 1619 at Antwerp, where the basis for a new church community was laid, under the name Remonstrant Reformed Brotherhood. Uytenbogaert and Episcopius, who had found a refuge in Rouen, and Grevinchoven, formerly a preacher of Rotterdam, now in Holstein, assumed the leadership of the Brotherhood while three exiled preachers secretly returned to their country to care for the congregations left there; for in spite of the unfavorable decree, there was still left a considerable number who would not hear the doctrine of absolute grace preached, and there were not wanting deposed preachers who dared to serve them. In 1621 Episcopius drew up a Confessio sive declaratio sententiæ pastorum qui Remonstrantes vocantur [Confession or Declaration of the Pastors which are called Remonstrants], which found a large circulation in its Dutch translation. Episcopius was actually the leading theologian of the Remonstrants.

Dr. Mark A. Ellis, states: "They intended it as a concise, easily understandable statement of their faith and a corrective to what they viewed as the misrepresentations published in the Acts of the Synod of Dort."

== The Confession of 1621 ==
=== Purpose ===
Concerning the purpose and the scope of the Confession Ellis, states:

"Many [Remonstrants] were hesitant, fearful of establishing the same type of creedalism which had resulted in their persecution and banishment. The Preface to the Confession, which the Remonstrants considered an integral part of the document, emphasized its non-binding character. The society eventually judged it more important to prove their orthodoxy to those who wanted to assist them, to silence the misrepresentations of their opposition, and most of all, to encourage and unite the now distressed and scattered Remonstrants. They selected Episcopius and two others to write it, but in the end, he did the work alone."

=== The text ===
The confession was completed and approved in 1620. The Dutch edition was published in 1621, the Latin in 1622. The text itself is composed of one preface and 25 chapters, which deal successively with:

- Chapter 1: The sacred scriptures
- Chapters 2-6: God nature, deeds and providence mode
- Chapters 7-10: Christ salvation deeds toward men
- Chapters 11-16: Christian spiritual life aspects
- Chapters 17-20: God's election mode, and eschatological considerations
- Chapters 21-25: Church and Christian ministry aspects

== Theological views ==
=== Theological legacy ===
Roger E. Olson notes that the Confession is substantially aligned with Jacobus Arminius' views.

Ellis adds that "the Confession does not reflect Arminius theology alone. It also represents those who were Arminian before Arminius (such as Wtenbogaert and older pastors), together with Episcopius' own creative impulses."

=== Refutation of Socinian charge ===
In the confession, the Remonstrants gave a clear repudiation of Socinianism‟s denials of the divinity of Christ and the trinity:

Therefore, the Son and the Holy Spirit, although both are divine with respect to their hypostasis, manner, and order, are truly distinct from the Father; yet they are truly partakers with the Father of the same deity or divine essence and nature absolutely and commonly considered [...]

=== Affirmation of total depravity ===
The remonstrants had denied Pelagianism in the original Five articles of Remonstrance of 1610, and repeated the same in the Confession, affirming again the total depravity of man:

Because Adam was the stock and root of the whole human race, he therefore involved and implicated not only himself, but also all his posterity (as if they were contained in his loins and went forth from him by natural generation) in the same death and misery with himself, so that all men without any discrimination, only our Lord Jesus Christ excepted, are by this one sin of Adam deprived of that primeval happiness, and destitute of true righteousness necessary for achieving eternal life, and consequently are now born subject to that eternal death of which we spoke, and manifold miseries.

It was from this that the highest necessity and also advantage of divine grace, prepared for us in Christ the Savior before the ages, clearly appeared. For without it we could neither shake off the miserable yoke of sin, nor do anything truly good in all religion, nor finally ever escape eternal death or any true punishment of sin. Much less could we at any time obtain eternal salvation without it or through ourselves.

=== Affirmation of prevenient grace ===
The Remonstrants had previously denied Semipelagianism and reaffirmed in the Confession the prevenient grace of God:

“We think therefore that the grace of God is the beginning, progress and completion of all good, so that not even a regenerate man himself can, without this preceding, or preventing, exciting, following and cooperating grace, think, will, or finish any good thing to be saved, much lest resist any attractions and temptations to evil.”

They differed with their opponents not over the necessity of grace, but in their belief that a person can “despise and reject the grace of God and resist its operation". Roger Olson sees here and elsewhere in the Confession a depiction of the prevenient grace, consistent with the one presented by Charles Wesley.

=== Affirmation of conditional preservation of the Saints ===
In the Five articles of Remonstrance, the Remonstrants proposed that the perseverance of the saints, may be conditional upon the faith and obedience. Sometime between 1610, and the official proceeding of the Synod of Dort (1618), the Remonstrants became persuaded of conditional preservation of the saints, and of the possibility of apostasy, which is that a true believer is capable of falling away from faith and perishing eternally as an unbeliever. They formalized their views in "The Opinion of the Remonstrants" (1618).

In the Confession, the Remonstrants simply confirmed that opinion in several ways. For instance they held that:

Even if it is true that those who are adept in the habit of faith and holiness can only with difficulty fall back to their former profaneness and dissoluteness of life, yet we believe that it is entirely possible, if not rarely done, that they fall back little by little and until they completely lack their prior faith and charity. And having abandoned the way of righteousness, they revert to their worldly impurity which they had truly left, returning like pigs to wallowing in the mud and dogs to their vomit, and are again entangled in lusts of the flesh which they had formerly, truly fled. And thus totally and at length also they are finally torn from the grace of God unless they seriously repent in time.

=== Rejection of scholasticism ===
Ellis says :

We find in the Confession a corollary to the rejection of Reformed scholasticism, the Remonstrant insistence that all true theology was entirely practical and not speculative or theoretical. Whatever the modern equivocations over the meaning of “speculative theology,” for Episcopius it signified theology which was derived from reason rather than from Scripture and served to satisfy theological curiosity rather than promote the worship of God. […] This emphasis on theology as a practical science became one of the hallmarks of Remonstrant theology.

== Reception ==
The reception of the Confession was mixed within the Dutch Reformed community. While some praised it, others criticized it as heterodox. In 1626, Johannes Polyander and several colleagues authored a Censure of the Confession, examining it section by section and expressing suspicions of Socinianism. In response, Episcopus published Apologia pro Confessione (1630), providing detailed clarifications. Several theologians from the Netherlands, France, England, Denmark and Germany in particular declared it to be orthodox and moderate. It also received approval from the Anabaptists.

== Revisions of 1940 and 2006 ==
The Remonstrant confession of 1621 was revised and published in a succinct form in 1940, losing most of its original details. This revision was made as a testimony against the spiritual pretensions of National Socialism at the start of the German occupation of the Netherlands (1940-1945).

Afterwards a revision was done in 2006. The text does not start with God the Father (as is customary) but with the person who realizes and accepts "that existence is infinitely greater than we can comprehend". Next, reference is made to the inspiration by the Holy Spirit; this leads to Jesus and Jesus refers to God. This change in the classical order of the Christian confession is remarkable, but it also characterizes the current remonstrants views: faith starts with people.

== See also ==
- Arminianism

== Notes and references ==
=== Sources ===
- Chisholm, Hugh, ed. (1911). "Remonstrants" . Encyclopædia Britannica. Vol. 23 (11th ed.). Cambridge University Press. p. 82.
- Brandt, Gerard (1726). Histoire Abregée De La Reformation Des Pais-Bas (in French). Amsterdam: Ledet.
- De Jong, Peter (1968). "The Opinions of the Remonstrants (1618)". Crisis in the Reformed Churches: Essays in Commemoration of the Great Synod of Dordt, 1618-1619 (PDF). Grand Rapids: Reformed Fellowship.
- Episcopius, Simon; Ellis, Mark A. (2005a). "Introduction" (PDF). The Arminian confession of 1621. Eugene: Pickwick Publications.
- Episcopius, Simon; Ellis, Mark A. (2005b). The Arminian confession of 1621 (PDF). Eugene: Pickwick Publications.
- Episcopius, Simon; Taylor, Thomas (1676). The confession or declaration of the ministers or pastors, which in the United Provinces are called Remonstrants (PDF). London: Printed for Francis Smith at the Elephant and Castle in Cornhil near the Royal Exchange.
- LBR (2019a). "Belijdenis" (in Dutch). Landelijk Bureau Remonstranten.
- LBR (2019b). "Wat geloven wij" (in Dutch). Landelijk Bureau Remonstranten.
- Olson, Roger E. (2015). "Review of Oliver Crisp's "Deviant Calvinism" Part Three". My evangelical, Arminian theological musings.
- Olson, Roger E. (2011). "J. I. Packer and Arminianism". My evangelical, Arminian theological musings.
- Schaff, Phillip; Herzog, Jakob (1953). "Remonstrants". The New Schaff-Herzog Encyclopedia of Religious Knowledge. Vol. 9. Grand Rapids: Baker.
- Stanglin, Keith D. (2014). "The Rise and Fall of Biblical Perspicuity: Remonstrants and the Transition toward Modern Exegesis". Church History. 83 (1): 38–59. doi:10.1017/S0009640713001674. JSTOR 24533140.
