= Augustinian soteriology =

Soteriological system of Augustine of Hippo

Augustinian soteriology refers to Augustine of Hippo's (354–430) view on human salvation and God's providence. His thinking was shaped by early encounters with Stoicism, Neoplatonism, and Manichaeism. Although initially opposing deterministic ideas, Augustine later incorporated elements of these philosophies, especially in his debates with the Pelagians. His doctrines, such as predestination by predeterminism, became foundational for later theological developments and had a lasting impact on Christian thought up to the Protestant Reformation. Augustine's influence on John Calvin (1509–1564) was particularly significant in shaping Calvinist soteriology and its understanding of divine providence.

== Developments of Augustinian soteriology ==
=== Theological influences in the early church ===
Manichaeism was a Gnostic sect founded in the 3rd century. It significantly influenced early Christian churches, promoting spiritual practices like asceticism and sacerdotalism. Manichaeism adopted a dualistic worldview, contrasting a spiritual realm of good with a material realm of evil, anticipating the gradual restoration of light from the material to the spiritual realm. In terms of soteriology, it maintained that God unilaterally selected the elect for salvation and the non-elect for damnation according to His will. For instance, in 392, a Manichean presbyter said that "God [...] has chosen souls worthy of Himself according to His own holy will. [...] that under His leadership those souls will return hence again to the kingdom of God according to the holy promise of Him who said: 'I am the way, the truth, and the door'; and 'No one can come unto the Father, except through me.'".

Early Church Fathers prior to Augustine of Hippo (354–430) refuted non-choice predeterminism as being pagan. Out of the fifty early Christian authors who wrote on the debate between free will and determinism, all fifty supported Christian free will against Stoic, Gnostic, and Manichean determinism.

=== Theological influences on Augustine ===
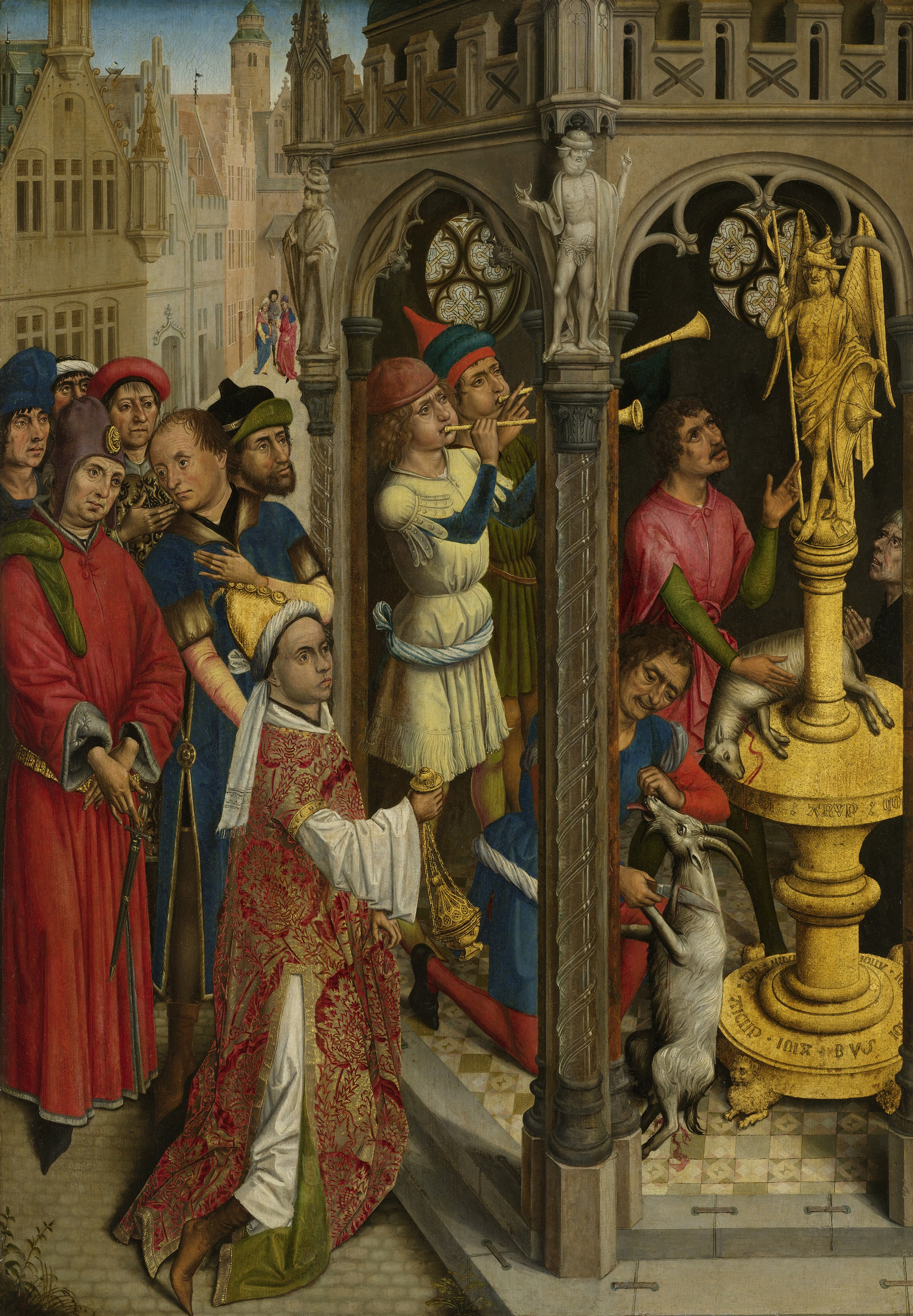
Anonymous (1480). Augustine sacrifices to an idol of the Manichaeans.

Before his conversion to Christianity in 387, Augustine adhered to three deterministic philosophies: Stoicism, Neoplatonism and Manichaeism. He was significantly influenced by them, especially during his decade-long association with the Manichaeans. He seemed to adopt Manichean perspectives on various theological aspects, notably on the nature of good and evil, the separation of groups into elect, hearers, and sinners, and the hostility to the flesh and sexual activity, and his dualistic theology.

After his conversion, he taught traditional Christian theology against forms of theological determinism until 412. However, during his conflict with the Pelagians, he seemed to reintroduce certain Manichean principles into his thought, and was accused by his opponents of doing so. For the rest of his life, he taught a soteriology where predestination is based on predeterminism. This soteriology can be articulated in the following points: human depravity, unconditional predestination, effectual calling, irresistible grace, limited atonement and final perseverance.

== Articulation of Augustinian soteriology ==
=== Total depravity and unconditional election in infant baptism ===
The controversy over infant baptism with the Pelagians contributed to Augustine's change. Tertullian (c. 155 – c. 220) was the first Christian to mention infant baptism. He argued against it by saying children should have their Baptism delayed (although he believed all should have baptism delayed.) Even by 400, there was no consensus regarding why infants should be baptized. The Pelagians taught infant baptism merely allowed children to enter the kingdom of God (viewed as different than heaven), so that unbaptized infants could still be in heaven. In response, Augustine responded that infants are baptized to remove Adam's original guilt (guilt resulting in eternal damnation). Inherited original sin was previously limited to physical death, moral weakness, and a sin propensity.

Another key element within infant baptism was Augustine's early training in Stoicism, an ancient philosophy in which a meticulous god predetermines every detailed event in the universe. This included the falling of a leaf from a tree to its exact location on the ground and the subtle movements of muscles in roosters' necks as they fight, which he explained in his first work, De providentia (On Providence).

Augustine taught that God foreordained, or predestined, newborn babies who were baptized by actively helping or causing the parents to reach the bishop for baptism while the baby lived. By baptism, these babies would be saved from damnation. Augustine reasoned further that God actively blocked the parents of other infants from reaching the baptismal waters before their baby died. These babies were condemned to hell due to lack of baptism (according to Augustine). His view remains controversial; even some Roman Catholic Augustinian scholars refute this idea, and scholars cite the view's origin as derived as from Platonism, Stoicism, and Manichaeism.

Augustine then expanded this concept from infants to adults. Since babies have no "will" to desire their baptisms, Augustine expanded the implication to all humans. He concluded that God must predestine by predeterminism all humans prior to them making any choice. Although earlier Christians taught original sin, the concept of total depravity (total inability to believe in Christ) was borrowed from Gnostic Manichaeism. Manichaeism taught that unborn babies and unbaptized infants were damned to hell because of a physical body. Like the Gnostics, the Manichaean god had to resurrect the dead will by infusing faith and grace. Augustine changed the cause of total depravity to Adam's guilt but kept the Stoic, Manichaean, and Neoplatonic concepts of the human dead will requiring God's infused grace and faith to respond.

=== Limited atonement ===
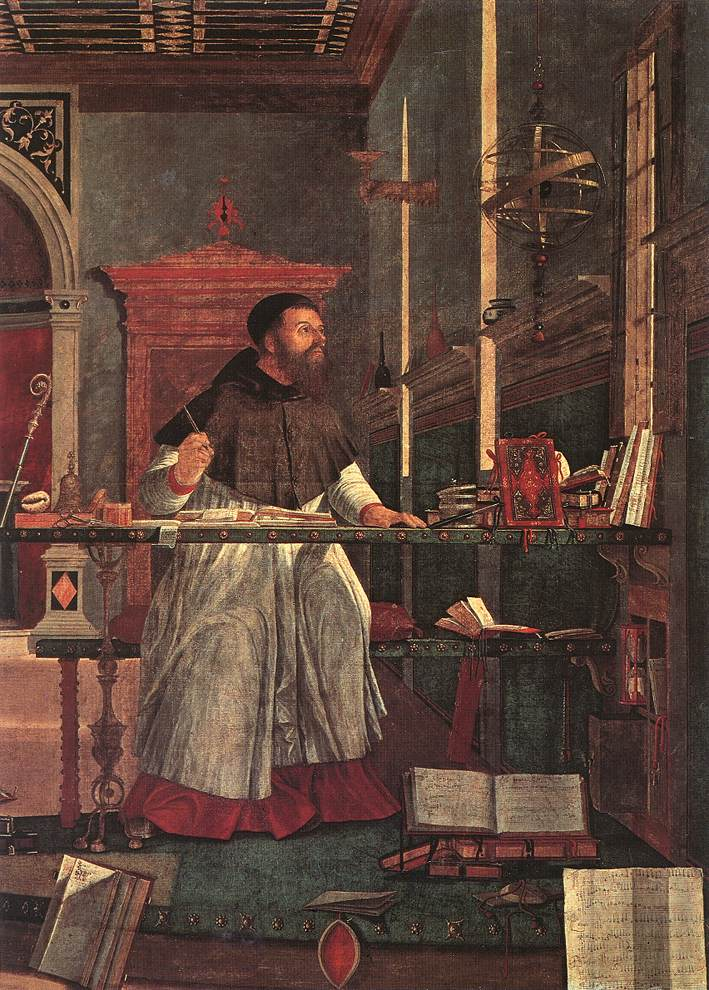
Vittore Carpaccio (1502). St. Augustine in His Study (detail)

Augustine attempted numerous explanations of 1 Timothy 2:4. The Pelagians assumed 1 Tim. 2:4 taught that God gave the gift of faith to all persons, which Augustine easily refuted by changing wills/desires to "provides opportunity". In 414, Augustine's new theology has "all kinds/classes" definitively replacing "all" as absolute. In 417, he repeated this change of "all" to "all kinds".

In 421 Augustine altered the text to read "all who are saved", meaning those who are saved are only saved by God's will, which he repeated the next year. People fail to be saved, "not because they do not will it, but because God does not". Despite their certain damnation, God makes other Christians desire their impossible salvation. John Rist identifies this as "the most pathetic passage". By 429, Augustine quotes 1 Corinthians 1:18 adding "such" to 1 Tim. 2:4, redefines "all" to mean as "all those elected", and implies an irresistible calling. Hwang noted,

Then the radical shift occurred, brought about by the open and heated conflict with the Pelagians. 'Desires' took on absolute and efficacious qualities, and the meaning of 'all' was reduced to the predestined. 1 Tim. 2:4 should be understood, then, as meaning that God saves only the predestined. All others, apparently, do not even have a prayer.

Augustine attempted at least five answers over a decade of time trying to explain 1 Tim. 2:4 regarding the extent of Christ's redeeming sacrifice. His major premise was the pagan idea that God receives everything he desires. Omnipotence (Stoic and Neoplatonic) is doing whatever the One desires, ensuring everything that occurs in the universe is exactly the Almighty's will and so must come to pass. Augustine's new theology has "all kinds/classes" definitively replacing "all" as absolute. In 417, he repeated this change of "all" to "all kinds". He concluded that because God gets everything he wants, God does not desire all persons to be saved, otherwise every human would be saved.

Henry Chadwick concluded that because Augustine's God does not desire and so refuses to save all persons, Augustine elevated God's sovereignty as absolute and God's justice was trampled. This also logically demanded that Christ could not have died for those who would not be saved. Therefore, Christ only died for the elect since God does not waste causation or energy.

=== Irresistible grace ===
Augustine developed the concept of "prevenient grace". In response to Pelagianism, he argued that prevenient grace is necessary to prepare the human will for conversion. When Pelagius appealed to St. Ambrose (c. 339 – c. 397) to support his view, Augustine replied with a series of quotations from Ambrose which indicated the need for prevenient grace. Augustine described free will without the spiritual aid of grace as, "captive free will" (Latin: liberum arbitrium captivatum).

Through the influence of grace, however, this will becomes a spiritually "freed will" or literally a "liberated free will" (Latin: liberum arbitrium liberatum). Prevenient grace first imparts essential spiritual enlightenment, after which the power to believe is granted exclusively to the elect. Augustine viewed the grace leading to justification as unfailing for the elect, though he did not explicitly call it "irresistible grace". Some Protestant theologians interpret Augustine's teachings as implying that justifying grace is indeed irresistible.

=== Perseverance of the saints ===
Since Augustine believed that the Holy Spirit is received at water baptism, producing regeneration, he had to explain why some baptized individuals continued in the faith while others fell away and lived immoral lives. Augustine taught that among those regenerated through baptism, some are given an additional gift of perseverance ("donum perseverantiae") which enables them to maintain their faith and prevents them from falling away. Without this second gift, a baptized Christian with the Holy Spirit would not persevere and ultimately would not be saved.

Augustine developed this doctrine of perseverance in De correptione et gratia (c. 426–427). While this doctrine theoretically gives security to the elect who receive the gift of perseverance, individuals cannot ascertain whether they have received it.

Hilary of Galeata (476–558) expressed concern that many Christians resisted Augustine's radical view of perseverance. Hilary complained, "[T]hey do not want this perseverance to be preached if it means that it can neither be merited by prayer nor lost by rebellion".

=== Double predestination ===
Double predestination, or the double decree, is the doctrine that God actively decrees both the damnation of some individuals and the salvation of those He has elected. After 411, Augustine made statements supporting this view. While his earlier writings are ambiguous on the matter, his later teachings more clearly affirm predestination by predeterminism.

Prosper of Aquitaine (c. 390 – c. 455) expressed concerns that many Christians resisted Augustine's new and controversial view of predestination. The opposition arose because Augustine's view rejected the traditional view of election based upon God's foreknowledge, replacing it with a predestination as "necessity based upon fate". Similarly, the Council of Arles (475) condemned the idea that "some have been condemned to death, others have been predestined to life". In 529, the Second Council of Orange explicitly rejected the notion of predestination to evil.

Catholic scholars tend to deny Augustine held double predestination while some Protestants and secular scholars have held that Augustine did believe in it. Current scholarly debates suggest that this doctrine is at least implied by his later thought.

== Later influence of Augustinian soteriology ==
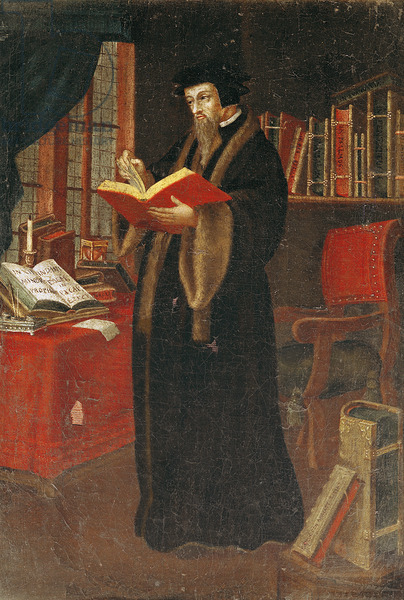
Anonymous (17th century) Portrait of John Calvin

=== Proponents of Augustinian soteriology before the Reformation ===
Between the 5th century and the Reformation in the 16th century, theologians who upheld Augustinian soteriology, included: Gottschalk of Orbais (c. 808–868), Ratramnus (died 868), Thomas Bradwardine (1300–1349), Gregory of Rimini (1300–1358), John Wycliffe (1320s – 1384), Johann Ruchrat von Wesel (died 1481), Girolamo Savonarola (1452–1498) and Johann von Staupitz (1460–1524).

=== Reformed and Lutheran proponents ===
In the centuries preceding the Reformation, an "Augustinian Renaissance" took place, reviving interest in Augustine’s thought. Augustine is widely regarded as the most influential patristic figure for the Reformation, which was shaped by theologians deeply rooted in his soteriology, including Martin Luther (1483–1546), Huldrych Zwingli (1484–1531), and John Calvin (1509–1564).

=== Augustine influence on Calvin ===
John Calvin wrote, "Augustine is so much at one with me that, if I wished to write a confession of my faith, it would abundantly satisfy me to quote wholesale from his writings."

Reformed theologian C. Matthew McMahon explained: "This is why one finds that every four pages written in the Institutes of the Christian Religion John Calvin quoted Augustine. Calvin, for this reason, would deem himself not a Calvinist, but an Augustinian. [...] Christian Calvinist, should they be more likely deemed an Augustinian-Calvinist?" Phillip Cary, a specialist on Augustine, concurs, writing, "As a result, Calvinism in particular is sometimes referred to as Augustinianism."

Twentieth-century Reformed theologian B. B. Warfield said, "The system of doctrine taught by Calvin is just the Augustinianism common to the whole body of the Reformers." Reformed theologian Paul Helm describes his perspective as "Augustinian-Calvinist" in the chapter "The Augustinian-Calvinist View" in Divine Foreknowledge: Four Views.

=== Summary of Calvinist soteriology ===
The soteriology of Calvin was further shaped and systematized by Theodore Beza and other theologians. It was then articulated during the Second Synod of Dort (1618–1619) in response to the opposing Five Articles of Remonstrance. A basic summary of the Canons of Dort is given by the five points of Calvinism: Total depravity, unconditional election, limited atonement, irresistible grace, and perseverance of the saints. Modern Reformed theologians continue to assert these points as a simple summary of the Calvinist soteriological doctrines.

John Calvin also held double predestination views. John Calvin states: "By predestination we mean the eternal decree of God, by which he determined with himself whatever he wished to happen with regard to every man. All are not created on equal terms, but some are preordained to eternal life, others to eternal damnation; and, accordingly, as each has been created for one or other of these ends, we say that he has been predestined to life or to death."

=== Jansenism ===
Jansenism was a theological movement within 17th- and 18th-century Roman Catholicism, rooted in Augustinian soteriology. The movement's teachings were ultimately condemned by the Church in 1713.

== See also ==
- Neoplatonism and Christianity
- Five Points of Calvinism
- Predestination in Calvinism
