= Five Points of Calvinism =

Fundamental teachings of Calvinism

The Five Points of Calvinism constitute a summary of soteriology in Reformed Christianity. Named after John Calvin, they largely reflect the teaching of the Canons of Dort. The five points assert that God saves every person upon whom he has mercy, and that his efforts are not frustrated by the unrighteousness or inability of humans. They are occasionally known in English by the acrostic TULIP: Total depravity, Unconditional election, Limited atonement, Irresistible grace, and Perseverance of the saints.

The five points are popularly said to summarize the Canons of Dort; however, there is no historical relationship between them, and some scholars argue that their language distorts the meaning of the Canons, Calvin's theology, and the theology of 17th-century Calvinistic orthodoxy, particularly in the language of total depravity and limited atonement. The five points were more recently popularized in the 1963 booklet The Five Points of Calvinism Defined, Defended, Documented by David N. Steele and Curtis C. Thomas. The origins of the five points and the acrostic are uncertain, but they appear to be outlined in the Counter Remonstrance of 1611, a lesser-known Reformed reply to the Arminian Five Articles of Remonstrance, which was written prior to the Canons of Dort. The acrostic TULIP was used by Cleland Boyd McAfee as early as circa 1905. An early printed appearance of the acrostic can be found in Loraine Boettner's 1932 book, The Reformed Doctrine of Predestination.

== The points ==
The five points are the following:

- Total depravity (also called radical corruption) asserts that as a consequence of the fall of man into sin, every person is enslaved to sin. People are not by nature inclined to love God, but rather to serve their own interests and to reject the rule of God. Thus, all people by their own faculties are morally unable to choose to trust God for their salvation and be saved (the term "total" in this context refers to sin affecting every part of a person, not that every person is as evil as they could be). This doctrine is derived from Calvin's interpretation of Augustine's explanation of original sin. While the phrases "totally depraved" and "utterly perverse" were used by Calvin, what was meant was the inability to save oneself from sin rather than being utterly devoid of goodness. Phrases like "total depravity" cannot be found in the Canons of Dort, and the Canons as well as later Reformed orthodox theologians arguably offer a more moderate view of the nature of fallen humanity than Calvin.
- Unconditional election (also called sovereign election) asserts that God has chosen from eternity those whom he will bring to himself not based on foreseen virtue, merit, or faith in those people; rather, his choice is unconditionally grounded in his mercy alone. God has chosen from eternity to extend mercy to those he has chosen and to withhold mercy from those not chosen. Those chosen receive salvation through Christ alone. Those not chosen receive the just wrath that is warranted for their sins against God.
- Limited atonement (also called definite atonement) asserts that Jesus's substitutionary atonement was definite and certain in its purpose and in what it accomplished. This implies that only the sins of the elect were atoned for by Jesus's death. Calvinists do not believe, however, that the atonement is limited in its value or power, but rather that the atonement is limited in the sense that it is intended for some and not all. Some Calvinists have summarized this as "The atonement is sufficient for all and efficient for the elect."
- Irresistible grace (also called effectual grace) asserts that the saving grace of God is effectually applied to those whom he has determined to save (that is, the elect) and overcomes their resistance to obeying the call of the gospel, bringing them to a saving faith. This means that when God sovereignly purposes to save someone, that individual will be saved. The doctrine holds that this purposeful influence of God's Holy Spirit cannot be resisted, but that the Holy Spirit, "graciously causes the elect sinner to cooperate, to believe, to repent, to come freely and willingly to Christ." This is not to deny the fact that the Spirit's outward call (through the proclamation of the Gospel) can be, and often is, rejected by sinners; rather, it is that inward call which cannot be rejected.
- Perseverance of the saints (also called preservation of the saints; the "saints" being those whom God has predestined to salvation) asserts that since God is sovereign and his will cannot be frustrated by humans or anything else, those whom God has called into communion with himself will continue in faith until the end. Those who apparently fall away either never had true faith to begin with (1 John 2:19), or, if they are saved but not presently walking in the Spirit, they will be divinely chastened (Hebrews 12:5–11) and will repent (1 John 3:6–9).

== Protestant comparison ==
Protestant beliefs about salvation
This table summarizes the classical views of three Protestant beliefs about salvation.
Topic	Calvinism	Lutheranism	Arminianism
Human will	Total depravity: Humanity possesses "free will", but it is in bondage to sin, until it is "transformed".	Total depravity: Humanity possesses free will in regard to "goods and possessions", but is sinful by nature and unable to contribute to its own salvation.	Total depravity: Humanity possesses freedom from necessity, but not "freedom from sin" unless enabled by "prevenient grace".
Election	Unconditional election.	Unconditional election.	Conditional election in view of foreseen faith or unbelief.
Justification and atonement	Justification by faith alone. Various views regarding the extent of the atonement.	Justification for all men, completed at Christ's death and effective through faith alone.	Justification made possible for all through Christ's death, but only completed upon choosing faith in Jesus.
Conversion	Monergistic, through the means of grace, irresistible.	Monergistic, through the means of grace, resistible.	Synergistic, resistible due to the common grace of free will.
Perseverance and apostasy	Perseverance of the saints: the eternally elect in Christ will certainly persevere in faith.	Holy Spirit strengthens the faith of the believer through the proclamation of the Word and participation in the sacraments; falling away is possible through loss of faith or mortal sin.	Preservation is conditional upon continued faith in Christ; with the possibility of a final apostasy.

English Reformed Baptist theologian John Gill (1697–1771) staunchly defended the five points in his work The Cause of God and Truth. The work was a lengthy counter to contemporary Anglican Arminian priest Daniel Whitby, who had been attacking Calvinist doctrine. Gill goes to great lengths in quoting numerous Church Fathers in an attempt to show that the five points and other Calvinistic ideas were held in early Christianity.

== See also ==
- Augustinian soteriology
- Five Articles of Remonstrance
- Predestination in Calvinism
