= Unlimited atonement =

Non-Calvinist Protestant doctrine

Unlimited atonement (also called general atonement, or universal atonement) is a doctrine in Protestant Christian theology which holds that Jesus Christ died as a propitiation for all humans without exception. It is understood that, although the atonement of Christ's death is sufficient for all humanity, its benefits are received only by those who freely respond in faith, enabled by God's prevenient grace.

The doctrine of unlimited atonement is particularly associated with Amyraldism (four-point Calvinism), Arminianism and other non-Calvinist traditions. It differs from the doctrine of limited atonement, one of the elements of the five points of Calvinism.

== Historical background ==
In response to the Remonstrants' Five articles of Remonstrance, the Synod of Dort published the Canons of Dort, which included limited atonement.

One of the stronger, more vocal proponents of unlimited atonement was Methodist leader John Wesley. Fellow Methodist leader George Whitefield opposed the view. The namesake of the Calvinist systematic theological viewpoint, John Calvin, seemingly expressed an unlimited atonement position in several passages from his published Commentaries.

== Doctrine ==
The terms unlimited, universal, and general are somewhat of a misnomer and have been adopted primarily to distinguish this doctrine from a Calvinist understanding of limited atonement. More accurately, the call of the Gospel is universal and there are no limits on who can believe through faith, but the legal payment is still regarded as limited only to those that respond through faith in Jesus. Thus, it is not the same as the doctrine of universal salvation, which holds that all souls will ultimately be reconciled to God, irrespective of faith.

The following statements regarding what it states and what it does not state are subject to close scrutiny of which many distinguished theologians on both sides of this issue disagree.

What it states

- The purpose of the atonement was universal—Jesus died on behalf of all people, not just the elect.
- The atonement makes a way for all to respond to the Gospel call—Part of the effect of the atonement is the restoration of the ability to respond to God's call of salvation (see Prevenient grace).
- Salvation is available for all—The doctrine of unlimited atonement rejects the predeterminism associated with Calvinism and states that every human has the opportunity to accept Jesus through faith.
- The atonement legally pays for the sins of those who believe on Jesus—Only those who believe on Jesus are forgiven—only the believers' sins are paid

What it does not state

- Jesus paid the penalty for those who deny faith in him, and His death was a substitutionary atonement for those who deny him—Though the term unlimited atonement can easily give the incorrect assumption that Jesus' payment encompassed all people, unlimited atonement maintains a limit on the legal effect. Jesus' death was indeed an offer of a substitutionary atonement to all, but this offer was resistible; though salvation is offered to all, not all are saved.

Amyraldism (commonly called "four-point Calvinism", holds a view of unlimited atonement similar but not synonymous with traditional Arminianism) teaches that God has provided Christ's atonement for all alike, but seeing that none would believe on their own, he then elects those whom he will bring to faith in Christ, thereby preserving the Calvinist doctrine of the unconditional election of individuals.

Lutheranism supports the idea of Jesus' atonement as unlimited in his extent.

Unlimited atonement has a number of important points in common with traditional formulations of limited atonement. Both positions affirm that:

- The call of salvation can genuinely be made universally
- Jesus paid the penalty only for those who have faith in him
- Jesus' death was a substitutionary atonement only for those who accept him

== Biblical passages ==
All quotes from the NKJV unless otherwise noted, emphasis added:

=== Scriptures used in support of unlimited atonement ===
These are Scriptures commonly used by those who support Unlimited atonement:

- John 1:29—"The next day John seeth Jesus coming unto him, and saith, Behold the Lamb of God, which taketh away the sin of the world."
- John 3:14–18—"And as Moses lifted up the serpent in the wilderness, even so must the Son of Man be lifted up, that whoever believes in Him should not perish but have eternal life. For God so loved the world that He gave His only begotten Son, that whoever believes in Him should not perish but have everlasting life. For God did not send His Son into the world to condemn the world, but that the world through Him might be saved. He who believes in Him is not condemned; but he who does not believe is condemned already, because he has not believed in the name of the only begotten Son of God."
- John 3:16—"For God so loved the world that he gave his one and only Son, that whoever believes in him shall not perish but have eternal life."
- Romans 3:23–24—"For all have sinned and fall short of the glory of God, and are justified by his grace as a gift, through the redemption that is in Christ Jesus"
- Romans 5:18—"Therefore, as one trespass led to condemnation for all men, so one act of righteousness leads to justification and life for all men."
- 2 Corinthians 5:14–15—"For the love of Christ compels us, because we judge thus: that if One died for all, then all died; and He died for all, that those who live should live no longer for themselves, but for Him who died for them and rose again."
- 2 Corinthians 5:19—"[I]n Christ God was reconciling the world to himself, not counting their trespasses against them, and entrusting to us the message of reconciliation."
- 1 Timothy 1:15—"Here is a trustworthy saying that deserves full acceptance: Christ Jesus came into the world to save sinners—of whom I am the worst."
- 1 Timothy 2:3–6—For this is good and acceptable in the sight of God our Savior, who desires all men to be saved and to come to the knowledge of the truth. For there is one God and one Mediator between God and men, the Man Christ Jesus, who gave Himself a ransom for all, to be testified in due time."
- 1 Timothy 4:10—"For to this end we both labor and suffer reproach, because we trust in the living God, who is the Savior of all men, especially of those who believe."
- Titus 2:11—"For the grace of God has appeared, bringing salvation for all people."
- Hebrews 2:9—"But we see Jesus, who was made a little lower than the angels, now crowned with glory and honor because he suffered death, so that by the grace of God he might taste death for everyone."
- 2 Peter 2:1—"They will secretly introduce destructive heresies, even denying the sovereign Lord who bought them." This appears to indicate that Christ "bought" some who are not among the elect.
- 2 Peter 3:9—"The Lord is not slack concerning his promise, as some men count slackness; but is longsuffering to us-ward, not willing that any should perish, but that all should come to repentance."
- 1 John 2:2—"And He [Christ] Himself is the propitiation for our sins, and not for ours only but also for the whole world."
- 1 John 4:14—"And we have seen and we testify that the Father has sent His Son as the world’s Savior."

=== Scriptures used to criticize unlimited atonement ===
These are Scriptures commonly used by those who deny Unlimited atonement:

- John 10:2–5,11,14–15"—But he who enters by the door is the shepherd of the sheep. To him the doorkeeper opens, and the sheep hear his voice; and he calls his own sheep by name and leads them out. And when he brings out his own sheep, he goes before them; and the sheep follow him, for they know his voice. Yet they will by no means follow a stranger, but will flee from him, for they do not know the voice of strangers...I am the good shepherd. The good shepherd gives His life for the sheep...I am the good shepherd; and I know My sheep, and am known by My own. As the Father knows Me, even so I know the Father; and I lay down My life for the sheep." This is usually reconciled by pointing out that Jesus died for everyone in theory, but He did it particularly for those who would follow Him.
- John 17:9—"...I do not pray for the world but for those whom You have given Me, for they are Yours." This is usually reconciled by claiming that this does not refer to the atonement itself.
- Acts 20:28—"Therefore take heed to yourselves and to all the flock, among which the Holy Spirit has made you overseers, to shepherd the church of God which He purchased with His own blood." This again is often reconciled by saying that Christ's death is only effective for those who come to the church, even though it is potentially effective for all.
- Romans 8:33–34—"Who shall bring a charge against God's elect? It is God who justifies. Who is he who condemns? It is Christ who died, and furthermore is also risen, who is even at the right hand of God, who also makes intercession for us." Attempts to reconcile this may point to the fact that in the unlimited view, Christ still only intercedes for those who follow Him.
- Ephesians 5:25—"Husbands, love your wives, just as Christ also loved the church and gave Himself for her." This is usually reconciled by saying that He did it particularly for those who would follow Him, although it was potentially effective for all.
- John 3:16—"“For God so loved the world, that he gave his only Son, that whoever believes in him should not perish but have eternal life." This clearly shows that only those who believe in Jesus will receive eternal life, which essentially limits the atonement to those who believe.

== See also ==
- Atonement in Christianity
- Conditional election
- Unconditional election
- Prevenient grace
- Universal reconciliation
