= Simon Episcopius =

Dutch theologian (1583–1643)

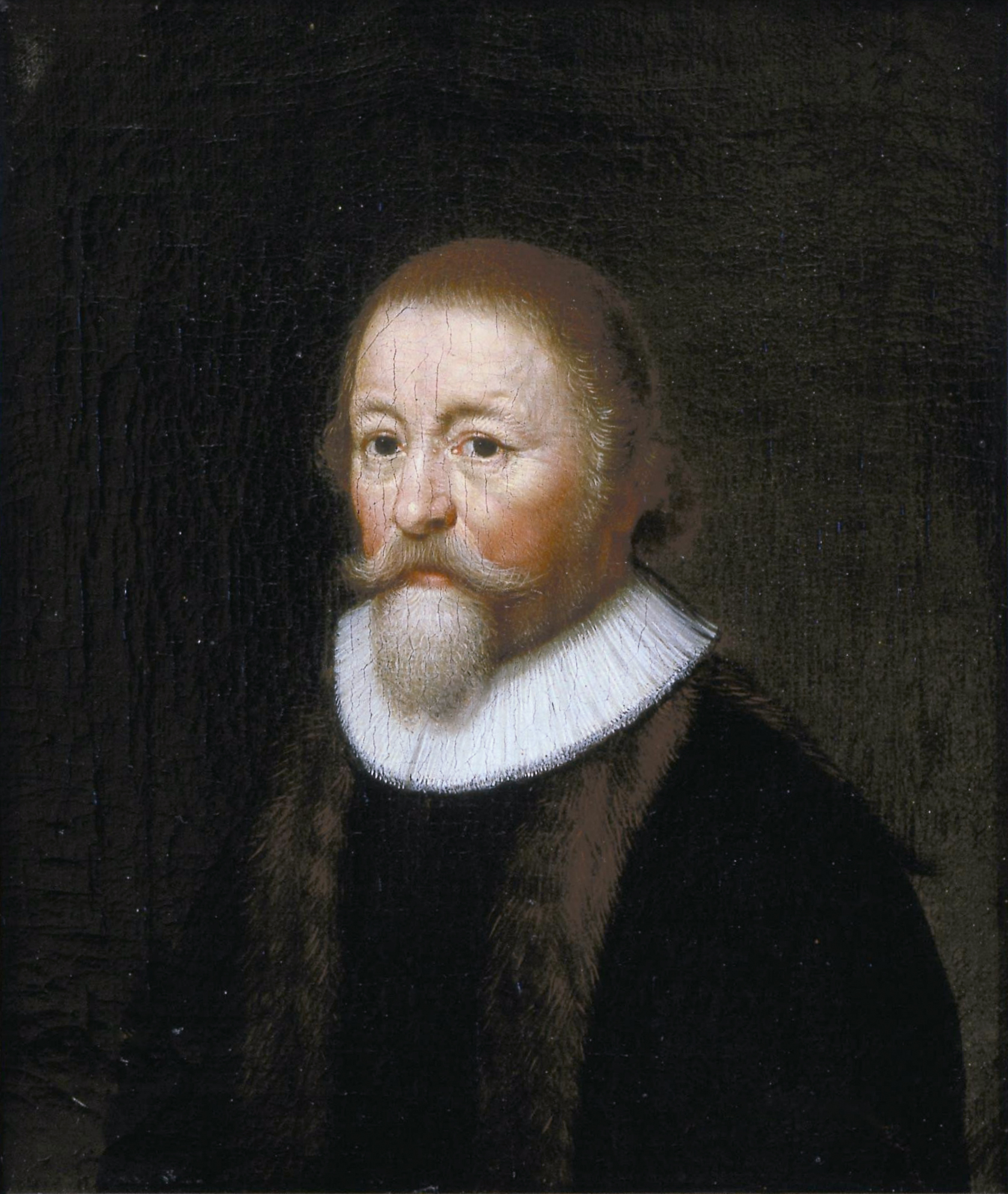
- Born: 8 January 1583; Amsterdam
- Died: 4 April 1643 (aged 60); Amsterdam
- Occupation: University teacher
- Employer: Remonstrants seminary (1634–1643); Leiden University (1612–1619)

Simon Episcopius (8 January 1583 – 4 April 1643) was a Dutch theologian and Remonstrant who played a significant role at the Synod of Dort in 1618. His name is the Latinized form of his Dutch name Simon Bisschop.

== Life ==
Born in Amsterdam, in 1600 he entered the University of Leiden, where he studied theology under Jacobus Arminius, whose teaching he followed, and Franciscus Gomarus. He graduated M.A. in 1606, but his appointment as a minister was questioned from the Calvinist side. He went to the University of Franeker, where he heard Johannes Drusius. In 1610, the year in which the Arminians presented the Remonstrance to the states of Holland, he became pastor at Bleyswick, a village near Rotterdam; in the following year he advocated the cause of the Remonstrants at The Hague conference (1611), and again at Delft in 1613.

In 1612 he succeeded Francis Gomarus as professor of theology at Leiden; his appointment awakened the bitter enmity of some of the Calvinists. He was attacked by Festus Hommius in Specimen controversiarum Belgicarum (1618).

At the Synod of Dort in 1618, Episcopius was chosen as the spokesman of the thirteen representatives of the Remonstrants before the synod; but he was refused a hearing. At the end of the Synod's sittings in 1619, Episcopius and the other twelve Arminian representatives were deprived of their offices and expelled from the country.

Episcopius retired to Antwerp and ultimately to France, where he lived partly at Paris, partly at Rouen. He devoted most of his time to writings in support of the Arminian cause. He notably wrote the Remonstrant Confession (1621). But the attempt of Luke Wadding to convert him to Catholicism involved him also in a controversy. After the death (1625) of Maurice, prince of Orange, the violence of the Arminian controversy began to abate, and Episcopius was permitted in 1626 to return to his own country. In 1630, he was appointed preacher at the Remonstrant church in Rotterdam. In 1634 he became rector of the Remonstrant college in Amsterdam, where he died in 1643.

== Views ==
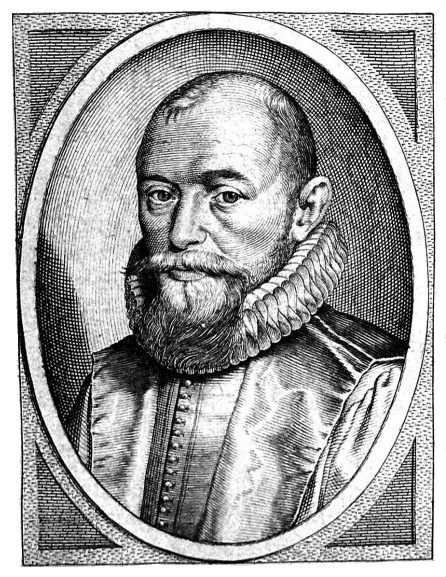
Simon Episcopius, ca. 1630

Episcopius may be regarded as in great part the theological founder of Arminianism, since he developed and systematized the principles tentatively enunciated by Arminius. Besides opposing at all points the peculiar doctrines of Calvinism, Episcopius protested against the tendency of Calvinists to lay so much stress on abstract dogma, and argued that Christianity was practical rather than theoretical – not so much a system of intellectual belief as a moral power – and that an orthodox faith did not necessarily imply the knowledge of and assent to a system of doctrine which included the whole range of Christian truth, but only the knowledge and acceptance of so much of Christianity as was necessary to effect a real change on the heart and life.

== Works ==
Here are some notable works of Episcopius:

- Episcopius, Simon (1612). Disputatio theologica de autoritate S. Scripturæ (in Latin). Lugduni Batavorum: Ex officina Ioannis Patij.
- Episcopius, Simon (1620). Antidotum continens pressiorum declarationem ... sententiae quae in Synodo Nationali Dordracena asserta est et stabilita (in Latin). Herder-vviici: ex officina typographi Synodalis.
- Episcopius, Simon (1620). Acta et scripta Synodalia Dordracena ministrorum remonstrantium in foederato Belgio (in Latin). Herder-vviici: ex officina typographi Synodalis.
- Episcopius, Simon (1621). Belijdenisse ofte verklaringhe van 't ghevoelen der leeraren, die in de gheunieerde Neder-landen Remonstranten worden ghenaemt, over de voornaemste articulen der christelijcke religie (in Dutch). s. l.: s. l. (Remonstrant Confession)
- Episcopius, Simon (1622). Confessio declaratio sententiae pastorum gui in foederato Beiglo Remonstrantes vocantur super praecipuis artscuf is religionis Christianae (in Latin). s. l.: s. l. (Remonstrant Confession)
- Episcopius, Simon (1629). Apologia Pro Confessione Sive Declaratione Sententiae eorum, Qui in Foederato Belgio vocantur Remonstrantes, super praecipuis Articulis Religionis Christianae Contra Censvram Quatuor Professorum Leidensium (in Latin). s. l.: s. l.
- Episcopius, Simon (1633). Vedelivs Rhapsodvs, sive Vindiciae Doctrinæ Remonstrantium a criminationibus & calumnijs Nicolai Vedelii ... : quas Rhapsodiarum in morem congessit & inscripsit arcana Arminianismi (in Latin). Hardervici: Ex Officina Typographorum Remonstrantium.
- Episcopius, Simon (1644). Paraphrasis et observationes in caput VIII, IX, X & XI epistolæ S. Pauli ad Romanos (in Latin). Amstelædami: Excudit Petrus Walschaert.
- Episcopius, Simon; de Courcelles, Étienne; van Limborch, Philippus (1650). M. Simonis Episcopii S.S. theologiae in Academia Leydensi quondam professoris Opera theologica : Quorum catalogum versa pagina exhibet (in Latin). 2 volumes. Amstelædami: Ex typographeio Ioannis Blaev.
- Episcopius, Simon (1650). M. Simonis Episcopii institutiones theologicae, privatis lectionibus Amstelodami traditae (in Latin). Amstelaedami: Ex typographico Ioannis Blaeu.

== Notes and references ==
=== Sources ===
- Episcopius, Simon; Ellis, Mark A. (2005). "Introduction" (PDF). The Arminian confession of 1621. Eugene: Pickwick Publications.
- Episcopius, Simon; Ellis, Mark A. (2005b). The Arminian confession of 1621 (PDF). Eugene: Pickwick Publications.
- Rogget, H. C. (1909). "Episcopius (Bisschop), Simon". The New Schaff-Herzog Encyclopedia of Religious Knowledge: Embracing Biblical, Historical. Vol. 4. New York: Funk and Wagnalls Company.

Academic offices
Preceded by Conrad Vorstius	Chair of theology at the University of Leiden; 1612–1619	Succeeded by André Rivet
