= Five Articles =

Five Articles may refer to:

- Five Articles of Perth, 1618
- Five Articles of Remonstrance, 1610
