= Samuel Loveday =

English Londoner Baptist minister

Samuel Loveday (1619–1677) was an English General Baptist minister in London.

== Life ==
Samuel Loveday was born in 1619 to William Loveday. Loveday was an important Nonconformist Baptist church leader at the City of London in the first half of the 17th century. He was a signer of the Standard Confession of Faith in 1660. Loveday died on 15 December 1677.

== Works ==
Samuel Loveday published:

- An Answer to the Lamentation of Cheapside Crosse; together with the reasons why so many doe desire the downfall of it, and all such Popish Reliques; also the downfall of Antichrist, 4to, London, 1642 (in doggerel verse).
- The Hatred of Esau and the Love of Jacob unfoulded, being a brief and plain exposition of the 9 chapter of Pauls Epistle to the Romanes, 12mo, London, 1650.
- Personal Reprobation reprobated: being a plain exposition upon the nineth chapter to the Romans, 8vo, London, 1676 (a different work from the above).

He also published two sermons on Matthew XXV. and Revelation III., and discourses on Isaiah III.
