= Election in Christianity =

In Christianity, particularly within the theological framework of Calvinism, election involves God choosing a particular person or group of people to a particular task or relationship, especially eternal life.

Election to eternal life is viewed by some as conditional on a person's faith, and by others as unconditional. According to Calvinist theology, before the foundation of the world, God chose certain individuals, known as the "elect", to receive his saving grace and be predestined for eternal salvation; Calvinists view this election as unconditional, based not on human merit or works but solely on God's sovereign will and purpose.

== In the Old Testament ==
The Old Testament applies the term "elect" (Biblical Greek: ἐκλεκτος; Biblical Hebrew: בָּחִיר) to the Israelites insofar as they are called to be the chosen people, people of God, or faithful to their divine call. The idea of such an election is common in Deuteronomy and in Isaiah 40-66.

== In the New Testament ==
The New Testament transfers the meaning of the term from its connection with the people of Israel to the members of the body of Christ (Christian church), either militant on earth or triumphant in heaven.

Based on the statement of Jesus Christ that one should, "enter in at the narrow gate, for wide is the gate, and broad is the way, that leads to destruction, and many there are that go in thereat. How narrow is the gate and strait the way that leads to life, and few there are that find it," (Matt. 7:13,14) many have inferred that there are very few elect, who are saved. However the number of the elect is generally an open question with no conclusive answer, as evidenced by the fact that there is no Catholic dogma concerning the matter.

== See also ==
- Predestination
- Corporate election
