= Five Articles of Remonstrance =

Theological propositions in opposition to Calvinism

The Five Articles of Remonstrance or the Remonstrance were theological propositions advanced in 1610 by followers of Jacobus Arminius who had died in 1609, in disagreement with interpretations of the teaching of John Calvin, then current in the Dutch Reformed Church. Those who supported them were called "Remonstrants".

== Background ==
Forty-three or so (the exact number is debated) Dutch reformed pastors and theologians met in The Hague on 14 January 1610, to state in written form their views concerning all disputed doctrines. The document in the form of a remonstrance was drawn up by Jan Uytenbogaert and after a few changes was endorsed and signed by all.

The Remonstrants did not reject confession and catechism, but did not acknowledge them as permanent and unchangeable canons of faith. They ascribed authority only to the word of God in Holy Scripture and were averse to all formalism. They also maintained that the secular authorities have the right to interfere in theological disputes to preserve peace and prevent schisms in the Church.

The Remonstrants' Five Articles of Remonstrance was met with a response written primarily by Festus Hommius, called The Counter-Remonstrance of 1611. This text defended the Belgic Confession against theological criticisms from the followers of late Jacob Arminius, although Arminius himself claimed adherence to the Belgic Confession and Heidelberg Catechism till his death.

Finally, the Five Articles of Remonstrance were subject to review by the Dutch National Synod held in Dordrecht in 1618–19 (see the Synod of Dort). The judgements of the Synod, known as the Canons of Dort (Dordrecht), opposed the Remonstrance with Five Heads of Doctrine, with each one set as an answer to one of the five Articles of the Remonstrance. It was this response which gave rise to what has since become known as the Five Points of Calvinism. Modified to form the acrostic TULIP they covered the soteriological topics within Calvinism, summarizing the essence of what they believe constitutes an orthodox view.

== The five articles ==
=== Article 1 ===
This article asserts that election is conditional upon faith in Christ, and that God elects to salvation those He knows beforehand will have faith in Him. It rejects the concept that election into Christ is unconditional.

=== Article 2 ===
This article asserts that Christ died for all, but that salvation is limited to those who believe in Christ. It rejects the concept of limited atonement, which asserts that Christ only died for those God chooses to be saved.

=== Article 3 ===
This article affirms the total depravity of man, that man is unable to do the will of God, and cannot save himself, unless spiritually enabled by the prevenient grace of God.

=== Article 4 ===
This article asserts that once God's prevenient grace has enabled a man to believe, man can resist God's grace by exercising his free will. It rejects the idea that justifying grace is irresistible.

=== Article 5 ===
This article, rather than outright rejecting the notion of perseverance of the saints, argues that it may be conditional upon the believer remaining in Christ. The writers explicitly stated that they were not sure on this point, and that further study was needed.

Between 1610 and the official proceeding of the Synod of Dort in 1618, the Remonstrants determined that the Scriptures teach that a true believer is capable of falling away from faith and perishing as an unbeliever. They formalized their views in "The Opinion of the Remonstrants" (1618), which was their official position during the Synod of Dort. They later expressed this same view in the Remonstrant Confession (1621).
