= Peter Y. De Jong =

American Reformed minister (1915–2005)

Peter Ymen De Jong (October 28, 1915 – August 28, 2005) was an American Reformed minister and professor.

De Jong studied at Calvin College, Calvin Theological Seminary, and Hartford Theological Seminary (Ph.D.). He served as minister in a number of congregations in the Christian Reformed Church before becoming Professor of Practical Theology at Calvin Theological Seminary. De Jong's Ph.D. thesis, published in 1945, was on The Covenant Idea in New England Theology, 1620–1847. In it he accused Jonathan Edwards of departing from classic covenant theology due to his "Anabaptist individualistic piety".

De Jong wrote a commentary of the Belgic Confession (The Church's Witness to the World, 1960), and edited a volume on the Synod of Dort: Crisis in the Reformed Churches: Essays in Commemoration of the Great Synod of Dordt, 1618–1619. He also wrote Taking Heed to the Flock: A Study of the Principles and Practice of Family Visitation.

De Jong was one of the founders of Mid-America Reformed Seminary and joined the United Reformed Churches after his retirement. W. Robert Godfrey notes that De Jong was "very conservative in the essentials of the faith," but "recognized the need to communicate effectively in the language of the modern world."
