= Unconditional election =

Calvinist doctrine

Unconditional election (also called sovereign election or unconditional grace) is a Calvinist doctrine relating to predestination that describes the actions and motives of God prior to his creation of the world, when he predestined some people to receive salvation, the elect, and the rest he left to continue in their sins and receive the just punishment, eternal damnation, for their transgressions of God's law as outlined in the Old and New Testaments of the Bible.

The alternative view to unconditional election is the Arminian doctrine of conditional election, the belief that God predestinates for eternal salvation those whom he foreknows will respond to God's prevenient grace with given faith in Christ's atonement. God's election was for a clear unalterable purpose, to elect those who will believe.

== Summary ==
In Calvinist theology, unconditional election is considered to be one aspect of predestination in which God chooses certain individuals to be saved. Those elected receive mercy, while those not elected, the reprobates, receive justice without condition. This unconditional election is essentially related to the rest of the TULIP (five points of Calvinism) doctrinal outline and hinges upon the supreme belief in the absolute sovereignty of God over the affairs of humans. God unconditionally elects certain people even though they are sinful as an act of his saving grace apart from the shortcomings or will of man. Those chosen have done nothing to deserve this grace.

In Calvinist and some other churches (Waldensians, Katharoi, Anabaptists, Particular Baptists, etc.) this election has been called "unconditional" because his choice to save the elect does not depend on anything inherent in any person chosen, on any act that a person performs or on any belief that a person exercises.

According to the doctrine of total depravity (the first of the five points of Calvinism), the influence of sin has so inhibited the individual's volition that no one is willing or able to come to or follow God apart from God first regenerating the person's soul to give them the ability to love him and take part in the salvation process. Hence, God's choice in election is, and can only be based solely on, God's own independent and sovereign will and [not] upon the foreseen actions of man.

Scholastic Calvinists have sometimes debated precisely when, relative to the decree for the fall of man, God did his electing – see supralapsarianism and infralapsarianism – though such distinctions are not often emphasized in modern Calvinism.

The Reformed position is frequently contrasted with the Arminian doctrine of conditional election in which God's eternal choice to save a person is conditioned on God's certain foreknowledge of future events, namely, that certain individuals would freely exercise faith and trust in response to God's offer of salvation. The Arminian doctrine agrees that the influence of sin has so inhibited the individual's volition that no one is willing or able to come to or follow God, but the Arminian doctrine of prevenient (or "enabling") grace is considered sufficient to enable a person to repent and believe before regeneration. Based upon God's foreknowledge of each individual human response to the gospel of Jesus Christ, God justly and sovereignly elects to salvation those he foresees exercising free will to repent, believe in the gospel of Jesus Christ and follow God.

== History ==
The doctrine was first articulated and popularized by 4th century Church Father Augustine of Hippo during his debates with Pelagius, and he taught that saving grace is bestowed by God on the elect according to his sovereign decrees. Few later theologians prior to the Reformation would take up this idea. However, prominent exceptions include Thomas Aquinas.

Unconditional election was first codified in the Belgic Confession (1561), re-affirmed in the Canons of Dort (1619), which arose from the Quinquarticular Controversy, and is represented in the various Reformed confessions such as the Westminster Standards (1646). Today, it is most commonly associated with the Reformation teachings of John Calvin as one of the five points of Calvinism and is often linked with predestination.

== Biblical passages ==
A number of passages are put forth to support the doctrine, including (quotations are from the KJV):

- Isaiah 42:1: "Behold my servant, whom I uphold; mine elect Chosen One, in whom my soul delighteth; I have put my spirit upon him: he shall bring forth judgment to the Gentiles."
- John 1:12,13: "But as many as received him, to them gave he power to become the sons of God, even to them that believe on his name: Which were born, not of blood, nor of the will of the flesh, nor of the will of man, but of God."
- Acts 13:48: "And when the Gentiles heard this, they were glad, and glorified the word of the Lord: and as many as were ordained to eternal life believed."
- Romans 9:15–16: "For he saith to Moses, I will have mercy on whom I will have mercy, and I will have compassion on whom I will have compassion. So then it is not of him that willeth, nor of him that runneth, but of God that sheweth mercy."
- Romans 9:22–24: "What if God, willing to shew his wrath, and to make his power known, endured with much longsuffering the vessels of wrath fitted to destruction: And that he might make known the riches of his glory on the vessels of mercy, which he had afore prepared unto glory, Even us, whom he hath called, not of the Jews only, but also of the Gentiles?"
- Ephesians 1:4–5: "According as he hath chosen us in him before the foundation of the world, that we should be holy and without blame before him in love: Having predestinated us unto the adoption of children by Jesus Christ to himself, according to the good pleasure of his will,"
- Ephesians 1:11: "In whom also we have obtained an inheritance, being predestinated according to the purpose of him who worketh all things after the counsel of his own will:"
- Philippians 1:29: "For unto you it is given in the behalf of Christ, not only to believe on him, but also to suffer for his sake;"
- 1 Thessalonians 1:4–5: "Knowing, brethren beloved, your election of God. For our gospel came not unto you in word only, but also in power, and in the Holy Ghost, and in much assurance; as ye know what manner of men we were among you for your sake."
- 2 Thessalonians 2:13: "But we are bound to give thanks alway to God for you, brethren beloved of the Lord, because God hath from the beginning chosen you to salvation through sanctification of the Spirit and belief of the truth:"
- 2 Timothy 1:9: "Who hath saved us, and called us with an holy calling, not according to our works, but according to his own purpose and grace, which was given us in Christ Jesus before the world began,"

Some biblical passages are put forth as evidence that human volition, not just divine action, plays a central role in salvation (see conditional election):

- Deuteronomy 30:19: "I call heaven and earth to record this day against you, that I have set before you life and death, blessing and cursing: therefore choose life, that both thou and thy seed may live:"
- Joshua 24:15: "And if it seem evil unto you to serve the Lord, choose you this day whom ye will serve; whether the gods which your fathers served that were on the other side of the flood, or the gods of the Amorites, in whose land ye dwell: but as for me and my house, we will serve the Lord."

Calvinists generally understand the former passages as giving a window into the divine perspective and the latter passages as speaking from the human perspective in calling people to work out the salvation God has given them.

== See also ==
- Corporate election
- Predestination
