= Conditional election =

Christian theological doctrine

In Christian theology, conditional election is the belief that God chooses for eternal salvation those whom he foresees will have faith in Christ. This belief emphasizes the importance of a person's free will. The counter-view is known as unconditional election, and is the belief that God chooses whomever he will, based solely on his purposes and apart from an individual's free will. It has long been an issue in Calvinist–Arminian debate.

== Arminian doctrine ==
The doctrine of conditional election is most often associated with the Arminian churches. The Arminians have defended their belief against the doctrine of other Calvinist churches since the early 17th century when they submitted the following statement of doctrine to the Reformed Churches of the Low Countries:

That God, by an eternal, unchangeable purpose in Jesus Christ His Son, before the foundation of the world, hath determined, out of a fallen, sinful race of men, to save in Christ, for Christ's sake, and through Christ, those who, through the grace of the Holy Spirit, shall believe on this his Son Jesus, and shall persevere in this faith and obedience of faith, through this grace, even to the end; and, on the other hand, to leave the incorrigible and unbelieving in sin and under wrath, and to condemn them as alienate from Christ, according to the word of the gospel in John 3:36: "He that believeth on the Son hath everlasting life: and he that believeth not the Son shall not see life; but the wrath of God abideth on him," and according to other passages of Scripture also.

== See also ==
- Corporate election, an alternative Arminian view
- Conditional security, a related doctrine
- Predestination
