= Apostasy in Christianity =

Abandonment or renunciation of the Christian faith

Apostasy in Christianity is the deliberate abandonment or renunciation of the Christian faith by someone who formerly professed it. The term derives from the Greek apostasia, meaning rebellion or defection. Warnings against apostasy appear throughout the New Testament, particularly in the Epistle to the Hebrews. Early Christian writers also discussed unbelief, false teaching, persecution, failures of perseverance, and the possibility of repentance and restoration.

Most Christian traditions have historically regarded apostasy as a real possibility for believers. Catholic, Eastern Orthodox, Anabaptist, Lutheran, Arminian and related Protestant traditions have generally affirmed that a genuinely regenerate believer can finally fall away, while Calvinism has notably rejected this possibility. These differences also affect how churches distinguish renouncing the Christian faith from leaving a particular denomination. Historically, apostasy has carried ecclesiastical sanctions and, in some legal systems, civil penalties. Contemporary discussions distinguish formal departures from churches from broader patterns of religious disaffiliation.

== Definition and contributing factors ==
Apostasy in Christianity is the abandonment or renunciation of Christianity by someone who was formerly a Christian. The term apostasy comes from the Ancient Greek noun apostasia ("ἀποστασία"), formed from apo- ("away from") and stasis ("standing" or "position"), literally denoting a "standing away", "stepping away from", "rebellion", "state of apostasy", "abandonment", or "defection". It has been described as a willful departure from Christianity or rejection of Christ by someone who previously professed the faith. It is a theological category describing those who have voluntarily and consciously abandoned their faith in the God of the covenant, who manifests himself most completely in Jesus Christ. In this sense, apostasy is the opposite of conversion and may be described as deconversion.

In his three-volume study of apostasy in the New Testament, B. J. Oropeza identifies several factors that can lead to apostasy. These factors can overlap, and some Christian communities may be affected by several at once. One major factor he identifies is unbelief. Other contributing factors include persecution, suffering and hardship, false teachings and factions, malaise, indifference and neglect of religious commitments, and sinful conduct ("vice-doing") or assimilation to attitudes and practices viewed as ungodly in a non-Christian culture.

== Biblical perspectives ==
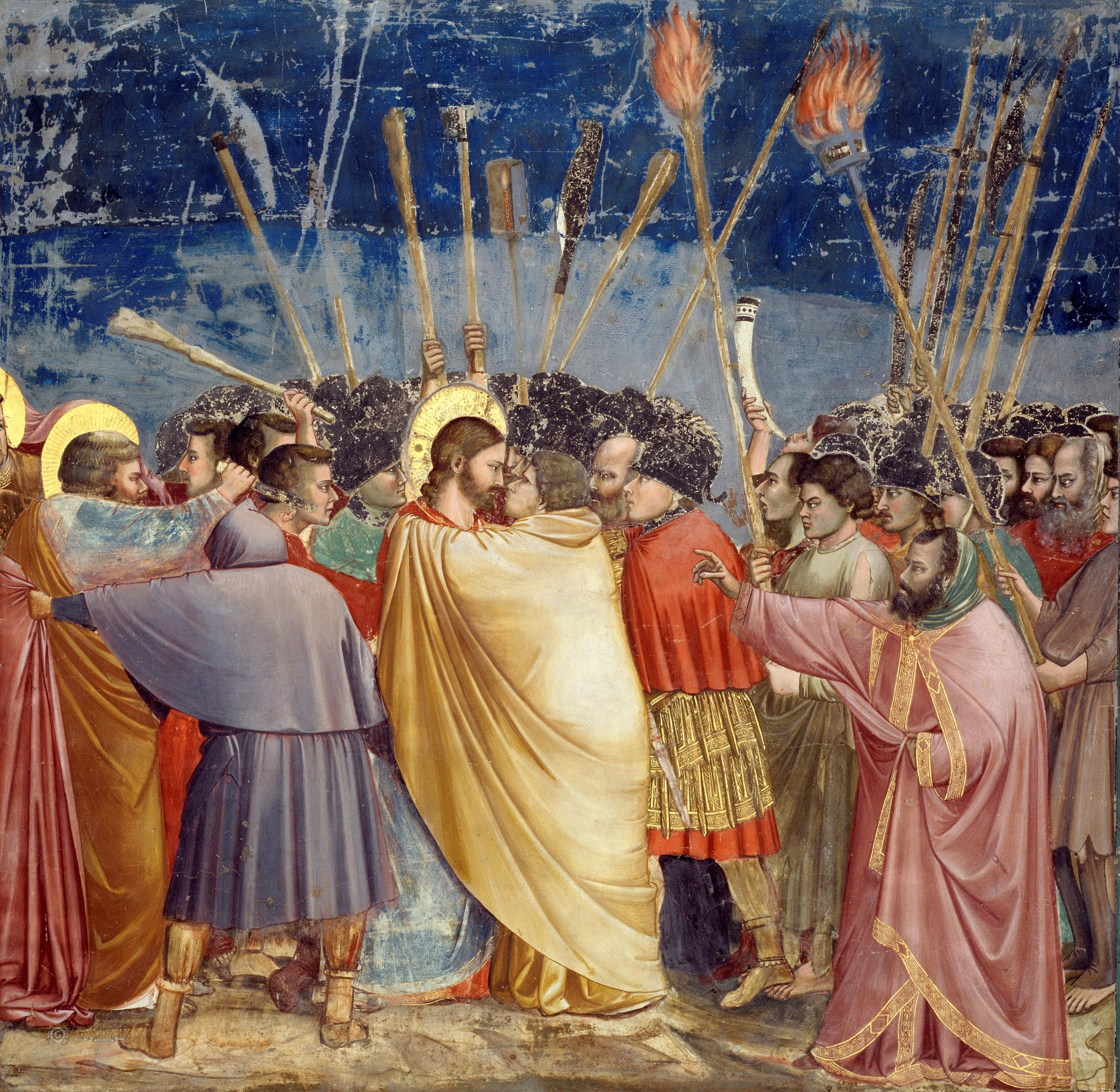
The Kiss of Judas, Giotto, 1304–1306. Judas's apostasy is debated among scholars.

=== Biblical terminology and warnings against apostasy ===
The Koine Greek noun apostasia (rebellion, abandonment, or defection) occurs only twice in the New Testament (Acts 21:21 and 2 Thessalonians 2:3), although the broader concept appears throughout Scripture. The related verb aphistēmi also appears in passages such as Luke 8:11–13, where Jesus compares seed on rocky ground to those who receive the word joyfully but fall away when tested, and 1 Timothy 4:1, which warns that some will later abandon the faith by following deceitful spirits and the teachings of demons. Similarly, Hebrews 3:12–14 cautions believers against an evil, unbelieving heart that leads one to fall away from the living God, urging believers to encourage one another daily against the hardening effects of sin. In the Old Testament tradition reflected in Deuteronomy (13:6, 17:2–7), turning away from God to serve other deities was regarded as a covenant-breaking transgression subject to strict judicial purging, a principle recalled in Hebrews 10:28 regarding those who broke the law of Moses without mercy.

In The New International Dictionary of New Testament Theology, Wolfgang Bauder notes that the First Epistle to Timothy associates falling away from faith with heretical beliefs, while the Gospel of Luke links apostasy to eschatological temptation and persecution. The Epistle to the Hebrews portrays apostasy as a movement away from God through unbelief. In these contexts, the verb aphistēmi conveys separation from the living God after an earlier turning toward him. Bauder further interprets figurative language of falling in the New Testament as referring to the loss of salvation, rather than a temporary lapse, and thus to a catastrophic fall ending in eternal ruin.

Related language includes the verb skandalizō (to fall away from faith) and the noun skandalon (an enticement to unbelief or a cause of spiritual downfall). Jesus uses these terms in Gospel warnings against personal sin (Matthew 5:27–30), in describing seed sown on rocky ground that falls away during persecution (Matthew 13:20–21; Mark 4:16–17), and in proclaiming eschatological judgments against those who cause believers to stumble or practice lawlessness (Matthew 13:40–42, 18:6–9, 24:4–13; Mark 9:42–48; Luke 17:1–2). In the Johannine farewell discourses, Jesus also warns his disciples against falling away in the face of the world’s hatred (John 15:18–27, 16:1). In Paul's epistles, skandalon and skandalizō describe obstacles that destroy a weak brother's conscience or lead church members away from sound doctrine (Romans 14:13–20, 16:17–18; 1 Corinthians 8:9–13), while Johannine and apocalyptic writings use the terms to portray hatred, false prophetism, and idolatrous seduction leading to spiritual fall (1 John 2:9–11; Revelation 2:14).

In his analysis of these Greek terms, Heinz Giesen observes that the passive voice often denotes falling away from faith under persecution or eschatological pressure, with the loss of salvation as its consequence. In the active voice, the verb describes causing someone else to reject the faith; apostolic exhortations therefore urge believers to avoid becoming stumbling blocks to others.

Paul Barnett observes that the Epistle of James warns that temptation can lead to apostasy. James attributes temptation not to God but to a person’s own desires (James 1:13–15). Barnett adds that the letter depicts a path of belief and conduct from which individuals can stray by their own choice, endangering their salvation (James 5:19–20). He also points to the Second Epistle of Peter, which associates apostasy with immorality and the influence of false teachers who deny the master who bought them (2 Peter 2:1–3, 14–22). In the Book of Revelation, Barnett identifies persecution, false teaching, and satanic deception as threats faced by the churches of Asia, whose members are urged to overcome them.

=== Apostasy in the Letter to the Hebrews ===
The Epistle to the Hebrews is a major New Testament text addressing the danger of apostasy. Scot McKnight proposes that its five major warning sections (2:1–4; 3:7–4:13; 5:11–6:12; 10:19–39; 12:1–29) form a coherent rhetorical pattern with four recurring elements: the community at risk, the specific transgression, the pastoral call to perseverance, and the ultimate divine judgment. McKnight concludes that the author addresses genuine Christian converts who risk deliberately renouncing Christ and rejecting the Holy Spirit. The letter urges them to remain faithful to the new covenant to avoid eternal perdition. B. J. Oropeza likewise observes that the community addressed in Hebrews faced both external mistreatment and internal spiritual fatigue, reflected in a growing reluctance to accept pastoral exhortation.

=== Biblical imagery of apostasy ===
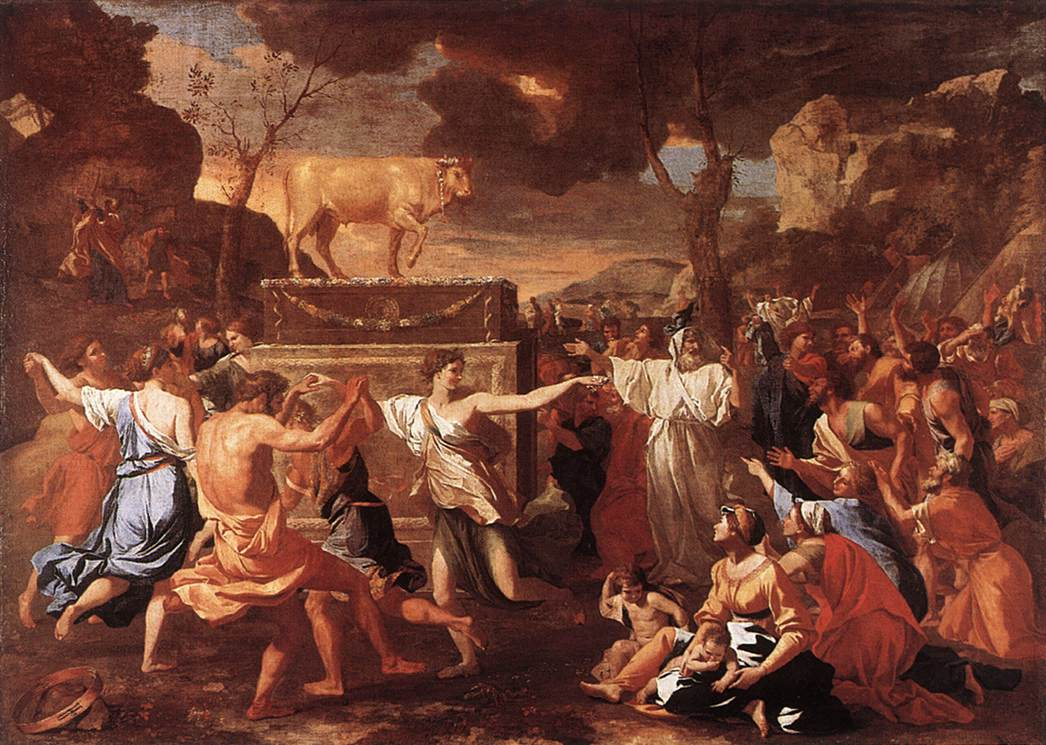
The Adoration of the Golden Calf, Nicolas Poussin, 1633–1634.

Biblical texts use varied metaphors for the deliberate abandonment of faith, notably revolt, departure from a path, collapse, and marital infidelity. In classical Greek usage and throughout the Septuagint, the term apostasia evokes the political sphere of a military coup or an insurrection against divine authority (Joshua 22:22; 2 Chronicles 29:19). In the Old Testament, rebellion is also portrayed as a change of direction, with the human heart turning from righteousness toward other deities, a concept captured by the Hebrew root swr, which illustrates stepping off the rightful path established by the covenant (Jeremiah 2:19; Ezekiel 3:20). In the New Testament, images of stumbling and catastrophic collapse become prominent, as in Christ's parable of the house constructed on sand that shatters amidst tempestuous trials (Matthew 7:24–27), highlighting the spiritual peril of moral failure or causing fellow believers to stumble (Mark 9:42–49). Prophetic writings frequently use the metaphor of adultery to portray idolatry as a betrayal of the covenant with Yahweh (Jeremiah 2:1–3, 5:7; Ezekiel 16). Other images across the two testaments include stubborn oxen, wild vines, and indelible stains in the prophetic books (Jeremiah 2:19–28), to Gospel and epistolary depictions of crops withering in shallow soil, severed branches burned in the fire (John 15:6), and animals reverting to mire and vomit (2 Peter 2:20–22).

== Apostasy in early Christianity ==
Christians of the post-apostolic era faced pressure from imperial authorities and religious opponents. Early writers highlighted three principal threats to perseverance: a return to former pagan vices, heretical teaching, and persecution. Their pastoral writings therefore emphasized fidelity to Christian ethics and apostolic teaching.

=== Moral conduct and spiritual perseverance ===
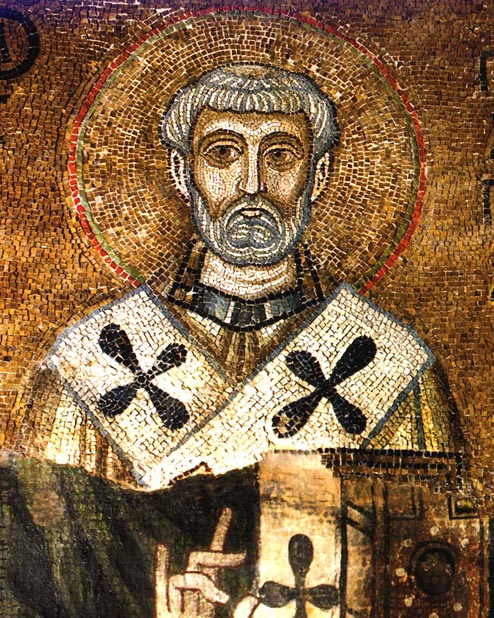
Portrayal of Clement of Rome, mosaic, 11th century, Saint Sophia Cathedral, Kyiv.

Clement of Rome (c. 96) traced divisions in Corinth to envy and worldly desires, warning that they endangered spiritual life (1 Clement 1–3). He also urged humility and perseverance (1 Clement 4–14, 21, 28, 35). He condemned schism as a source of doubt and a threat to communal faith (1 Clement 46, 57). Ignatius of Antioch (c. 107) warned that following schismatic leaders could exclude believers from the kingdom of God, while repentance could restore communion (Philadelphians 3, 8). The Epistle of Barnabas (c. 100) warns believers that unchecked vice and negligence can cost them eternal life (Barnabas 2, 4). Its account of the "Two Ways" contrasts love and obedience with idolatry, hypocrisy, and destructive conduct (Barnabas 18–21). Likewise, the Didache (c. 100) contrasts love of God and neighbor with the immoralities of the way of death (Didache 1–6).

Polycarp (2nd century) condemned greed as idolatry and called for self-restraint and faithful conduct (Philippians 5–6, 11). The anonymous homily 2 Clement (c. 150) similarly taught that professing Christ without righteous conduct was insufficient and warned against a return to worldly desires (4–8). Whereas Hebrews can appear to portray apostasy as final, The Shepherd of Hermas presents the possibility of restoration through repentance before the eschaton, symbolized by stones removed from or returned to a tower. Irenaeus (c. 180) treated Israel’s past failures as warnings that Christians who return to vice may be excluded from the kingdom despite knowing Christ (Against Heresies 4:27).

=== Heresy and doctrinal fidelity ===
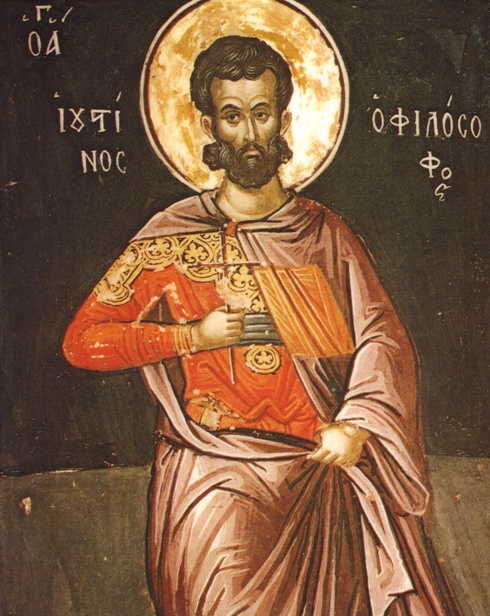
Icon of Justin Martyr by Theophanes the Cretan, 16th century.

Early Christian writers regarded false doctrine as a threat to salvation. Ignatius warned against teachers concealing heresy beneath Christ’s name, associating their doctrines with perdition (Ephesians 6–9, 16–17; Magnesians 8, 11; Trallians 6–9). The Didache likewise predicts that end-time false prophets would lead many astray, while those who endured would be saved (Didache 16).

Tertullian regarded heresies as trials foretold by the apostles (Prescription Against Heretics 1, 4). He argued that fidelity to apostolic tradition offered protection against doctrinal error (Prescription Against Heretics 2, 13, 37). He contrasted persecution, which produces martyrs, with heresy, which produces apostates (Prescription Against Heretics 3–4, 17, 38). Justin Martyr cited groups such as the Marcionites and Valentinians as examples of false teaching that should strengthen orthodox believers’ resolve (Dialogue with Trypho 35). Clement of Alexandria also warned against returning to sensual living or abandoning church tradition for heresy (Stromata 7:16).

Cyprian (c. 251) warned that heresies could masquerade as Christianity and fracture church unity (The Treatises of Cyprian 1:1–3). He urged adherence to Christ’s commandments. Eusebius later traced heretical deceptions from Simon Magus onward, describing them as threats to salvation. Such concerns helped establish excommunication as an institutional response to heresy. A notable later example of an apostate was the Roman emperor Julian (r. 361–363), who was raised Christian but later embraced traditional polytheism and sought to restore pagan worship.

=== Persecution and martyrdom ===
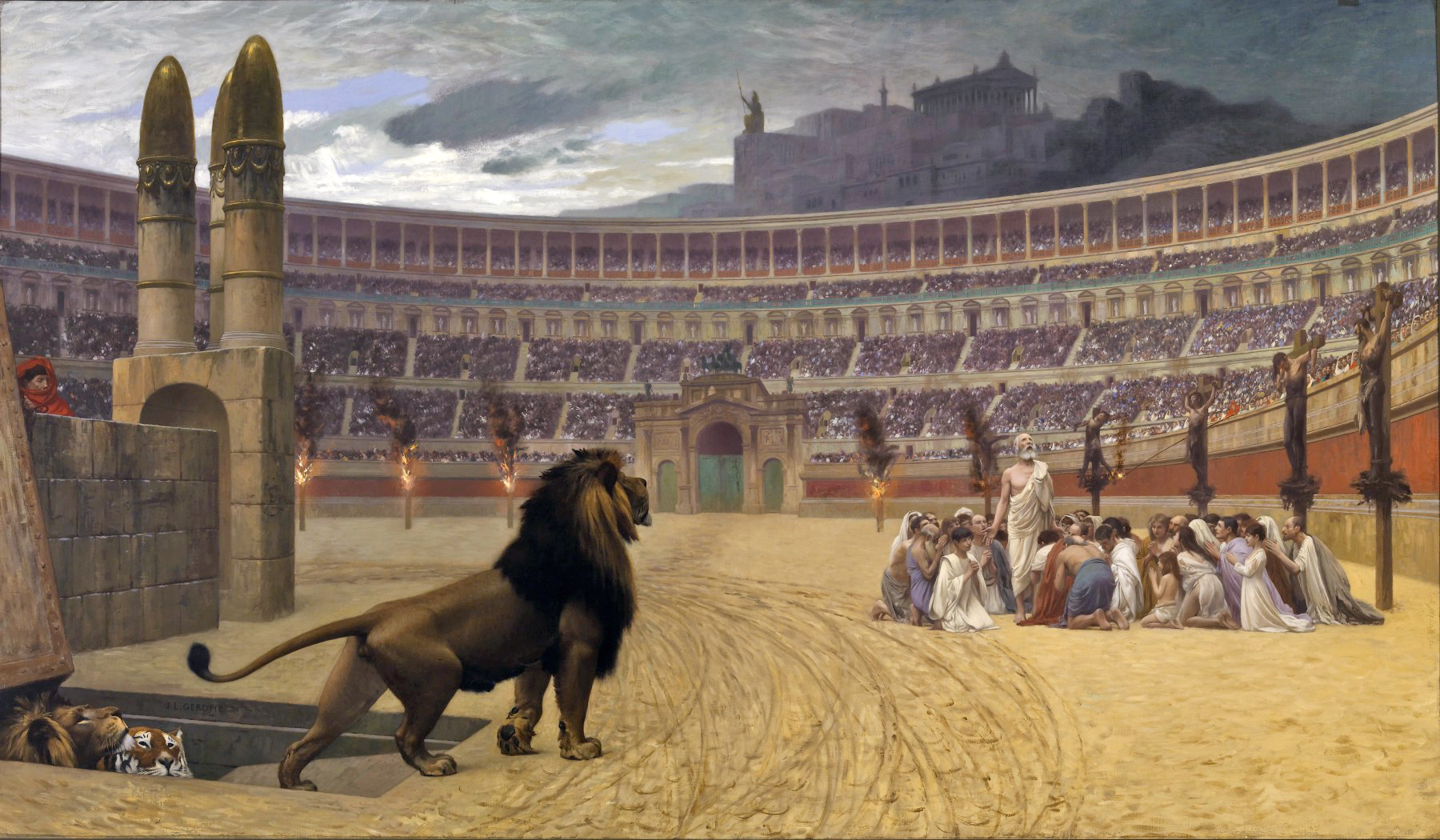
The Christian Martyrs' Last Prayer, Jean-Léon Gérôme, 1883.

Accounts of persecution in the Roman Empire contrast martyrs such as Polycarp with Christians who offered pagan sacrifices or renounced Christ. 2 Clement urged endurance for the reward of resurrection (19). Cyprian likewise exhorted imprisoned believers to remain humble and faithful until death (The Epistles of Cyprian 5–6).

Ignatius presented death by wild beasts as preferable to worldly honor (Romans 1–6). Tertullian treated martyrdom as resistance to idolatry that preserved salvation (Scorpiace 4–5, 9–12). Historians of early Christianity have emphasized the belief that even baptized Christians needed to persevere to avoid falling away.

=== Augustine of Hippo and the gift of perseverance ===
The teaching of Augustine of Hippo (354–430) differs from that of many earlier church fathers, reflecting the influence of theological determinism on his understanding of salvation. Augustine accepted that those who had received baptismal regeneration could apostatize, but held that final salvation depended on the gift of perseverance, granted only to some of the regenerated who belonged to the elect. He also maintained that believers cannot know with certainty whether they have received this gift. Later theologians influenced by Augustinian soteriology, such as Aquinas and Luther, adopted the same view, maintaining that those without the gift of perseverance could lose the grace of baptismal regeneration and justification.

== Theological interpretations and historical responses ==
=== Theological debates and pastoral responses ===
Although apostasy is a recognized biblical concept, Christian traditions differ in how they interpret its implications, particularly in relation to divine sovereignty and human freedom. These differences reflect distinct hermeneutical approaches. Some commentators advise against using biblical warnings as constant pastoral threats, instead emphasizing their role in encouraging self-examination and reliance on the Holy Spirit. Pastoral theologians also suggest that continued concern about one’s salvation may itself indicate that the person has not become hardened in apostasy.

=== Canonical and civil penalties in Catholic history ===
In 529, Justinian I prohibited apostasy under penalty of death. Medieval canonists distinguished apostasia a fide, the complete repudiation of the Christian faith, from heresy, although decretist jurists associated both with severe penalties, including death by burning. The 13th-century canonist Hostiensis distinguished three forms of apostasy: conversion to another religion, which could lead to confiscation of property or execution; violation of major commandments; and abandonment of religious vows, with the latter offences potentially subject to expulsion or imprisonment. Thomas Aquinas likewise distinguished renunciation of the Christian faith from departure from religious life or holy orders, which did not necessarily imply unbelief.

Later canon law continued to impose overlapping sanctions for apostasy and heresy. A decretal of Boniface VIII placed apostates alongside heretics for certain penalties, a framework employed by the Spanish Inquisition in cases involving converted Jews and Muslims suspected of returning to their former religions. The early modern jurist Prospero Farinacci also discussed apostasy and heresy as distinct but closely related offences. Cases of forced apostasy, however, raised questions about consent and culpability. During the 16th and 17th centuries, Christians captured by Barbary pirates in the Mediterranean and taken to North Africa could be compelled to convert to Islam. When such captives returned to Spain, canon lawyers and inquisitors assessed the degree of fear and coercion involved when deciding on penance and reconciliation with the Church.

Under the 1983 Code of Canon Law, a person who publicly defects from the Catholic faith or the communion of the Church loses any ecclesiastical office held; however, this loss can be enforced only after a declaration by the competent authority. Ecclesiastical funerals are denied to notorious apostates unless they showed signs of repentance before death. Catholic marriage law once provided exemptions for people who had formally defected from the Church, but Benedict XVI removed these in 2009. In 2010, the Congregation for the Doctrine of the Faith included apostasy, alongside heresy and schism, among the delicta contra fidem covered by its revised procedural norms.

=== Doctrinal controversies and church membership in Protestantism ===
Nineteenth-century evangelical revivalism helped shape the fundamentalist movements that opposed theological liberalism in early twentieth-century Protestantism. During the fundamentalist–modernist controversies, some conservatives sought to exclude liberals from established denominations, regarding their teachings as departures from traditional Christianity. Some Pentecostal interpretations of the Great Apostasy have likewise identified theological liberalism or other Christian traditions, including Roman Catholicism, with apostasy.

Definitions of individual apostasy also depend on how Protestant communities understand church membership. Historically, Lutheran churches have regarded baptized persons as Christians, whereas revivalist and Pentecostal groups emphasize personal and active faith; Baptists generally practice believer's baptism. Thus, the distinction between leaving a church and renouncing Christianity varies among traditions.

=== Restrictions on leaving Orthodoxy in the Russian Empire ===
In the Russian Empire, the privileged legal status of the Russian Orthodox Church meant that leaving Orthodoxy could carry both civil and ecclesiastical consequences. The Sobornoye Ulozheniye of 1649 prescribed execution by burning for those who induced Christians to convert to Islam, and in 1738 a man accused of inducing a conversion to Judaism was executed. The decree of 17 April 1905 legalized conversion from Orthodoxy to other Christian denominations, easing longstanding restrictions on religious affiliation.

== Theological perspectives across Christian traditions ==
=== Eastern Orthodoxy ===
Eastern Orthodox liturgical and theological traditions have been cited in support of conditional security and the possibility of apostasy.

=== Catholicism ===
In Catholicism, apostasy is the total repudiation of the Christian faith, distinct from heresy or schism under canon 751. It incurs automatic latae sententiae excommunication under canon 1364. The sacramental character of baptism, however, is regarded as indelible. Thomas Aquinas held that justified believers continually need divine grace and can lose salvation through mortal sin.

=== Anabaptism ===
Within the Anabaptist tradition, denominations such as the Mennonite Church and the Missionary Church teach that believers retain free moral agency and may therefore turn away from salvation.

=== Lutheranism ===
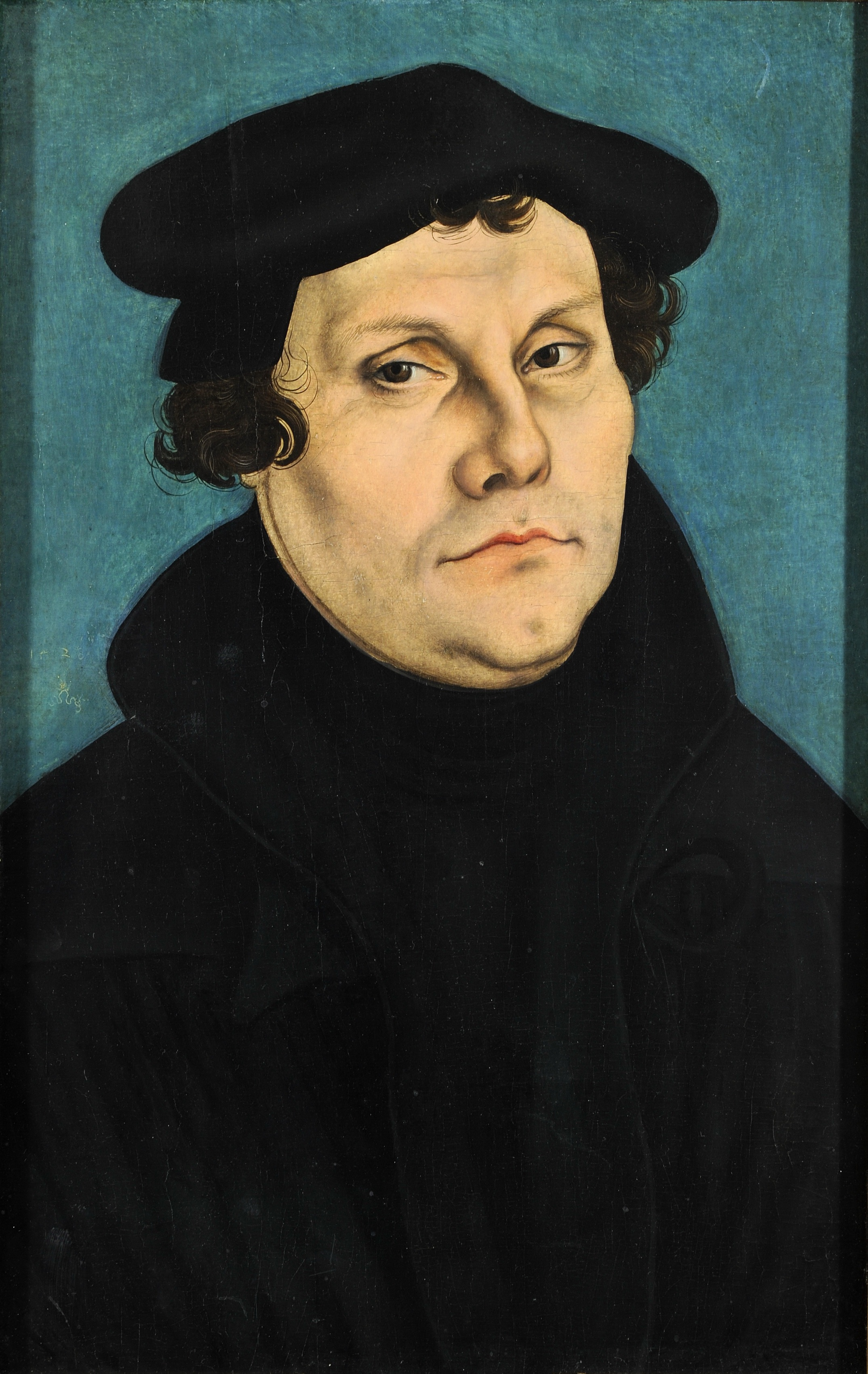
Portrait of Martin Luther, Lucas Cranach the Elder, 1529.

Martin Luther affirmed that baptismal grace can be lost, warning that falling from grace subjects backsliders to divine wrath. The Smalcald Articles teach that justifying faith and the indwelling Holy Spirit cannot coexist with unrepented mortal sin. They therefore affirm that even regenerate believers who fall into manifest wickedness can forfeit their state of grace. In the Apology of the Augsburg Confession, Philip Melanchthon rejects the idea that faith is merely historical knowledge that can coexist with deliberate sin. Melanchthon further argued that persisting in mortal sin without repentance drives out the Holy Spirit and destroys justifying faith. The Formula of Concord likewise affirms, within Confessional Lutheranism, that justifying faith is forfeited when individuals willfully turn away from God’s commandments.

=== Anglicanism ===
Anglicanism recognizes sin after baptism and the genuine possibility of departing from divine grace.

=== Calvinism ===
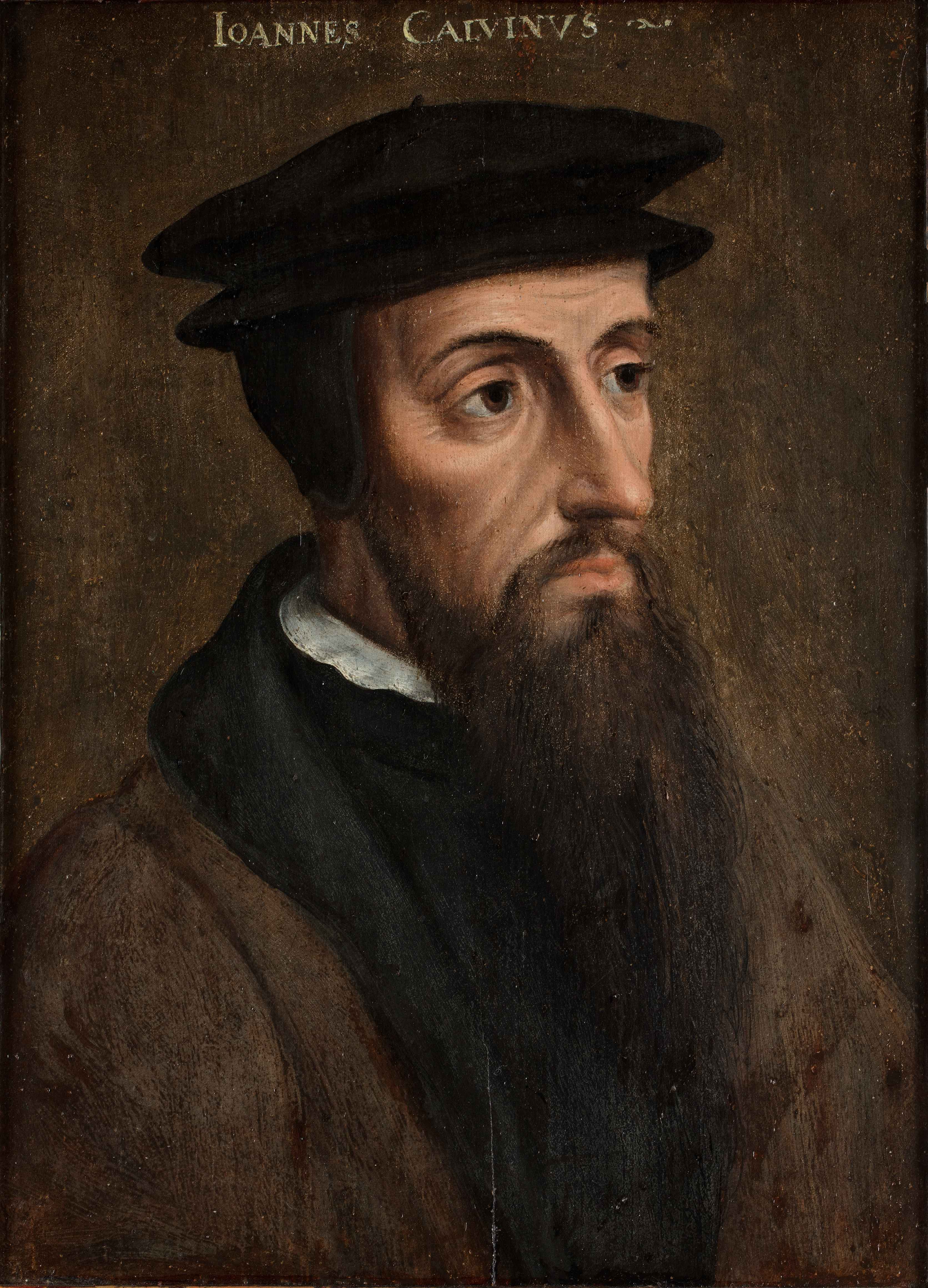
Portrait of John Calvin, anonymous, 16th century.

In Calvinist soteriology, regeneration by the Holy Spirit is permanent and ultimately leads to salvation. In Calvin's theology, divine predestination unconditionally elects some to eternal life while passing over others, so that the elect cannot ultimately be lost (Calvin's Institutes 3.21:5; cf. 3.2:15–40, 14.6–9, 18–20, 24.6f.). Consequently, apostasy is not possible for true believers. True believers may nevertheless experience temporary moral lapses, from which divine grace eventually restores them. Calvin understood scriptural warnings against apostasy as providential means of cultivating vigilance among the elect. He therefore interpreted the severe warnings in Hebrews (6:4–6; 10:26–29) as referring exclusively to reprobate members of the church who lacked genuine regeneration. To account for apparent apostasy, Calvin suggested that common grace could produce effects resembling effectual calling and irresistible grace. He therefore described a temporary grace, sometimes called "evanescent grace", that operates for a time among the reprobate before fading. On this account, the Holy Spirit may produce effects resembling those of irresistible grace in some people, including visible "fruit" in their lives. The doctrine of temporary grace, which explains apostasy as only apparent, was also upheld by later Calvinist theologians such as Theodore Beza, William Perkins, John Owen, A. W. Pink and Loraine Boettner. Within this understanding of the perseverance of the saints, genuine faith is ultimately demonstrated by perseverance to the end. The Calvinist doctrine of unconditional perseverance was articulated in Reformed confessions of faith including the Canons of the Synod of Dort (1619) and the Westminster Confession of Faith (1646).

=== Arminian traditions ===
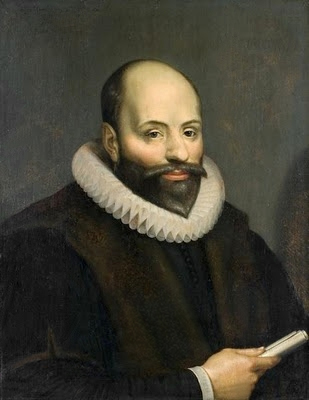
Bailly, David (1620). Jacobus Arminius.

Arminianism teaches that continued faith is necessary for salvation and that regenerate believers can fall back into sin and ultimately perish. This perspective was developed by Jacobus Arminius (1560–1609). After Arminius’s death, his followers drafted the Remonstrance (1610), drawing on his Declaration of Sentiments (1608) and taking a cautious position on the possibility of apostasy. Its fifth article explicitly called for further study of the question. Between 1610 and the convening of the Synod of Dort (1618), the Remonstrants became convinced that the Scriptures taught that a true believer was capable of falling away from faith and perishing eternally as an unbeliever. Simon Episcopius (1583–1643) formalized their views in "The Opinion of the Remonstrants" (1618), which served as their official position during the Synod of Dort. They later expressed this same view in the Remonstrant Confession (1621). Puritan John Goodwin (1594–1665) also presented the Arminian position in Redemption Redeemed (1651), defending conditional security. Arminian theology subsequently influenced several Protestant denominational families that affirm conditional security.

==== General Baptists ====
Early General Baptists, including figures such as Thomas Helwys (1575–1616) and Thomas Grantham (1634–1692), explicitly taught conditional security. Groups such as the General Association of General Baptists and the National Association of Free Will Baptists continue to emphasize that regenerate individuals must watch and pray lest they make shipwreck of their faith.

==== Methodism ====
John Wesley rejected the doctrine of unconditional final perseverance. This Arminian understanding of conditional preservation was later defended by Methodist thinkers such as Thomas O. Summers and William Burt Pope. It continued to influence Wesleyan and Holiness traditions, such as the United Methodist Church, the Salvation Army, the Church of God (Anderson, Indiana), and the Church of the Nazarene.

==== Pentecostalism ====
Pentecostal denominations such as the Assemblies of God maintain that believers remain free to depart from grace and lose their status in Christ.

=== Quakerism ===
Some churches in the Quaker tradition, including the Evangelical Friends Church – Eastern Region, affirm conditional security and the possibility of apostasy.

=== Restorationist traditions ===
Within Restorationist traditions, including the Churches of Christ, scholars have defended conditional security and the possibility of apostasy.

=== Free grace theology ===
Emerging in the 1980s, Free grace theology advocates an absolute form of eternal security: a person who has genuinely experienced regeneration cannot lose eternal salvation, regardless of later conduct or beliefs.

== Statistics and practices of religious disaffiliation ==
=== United States ===
According to the 2014 Pew Religious Landscape survey, 41% of religiously unaffiliated Americans, including atheists and agnostics, were raised Protestant and 28% were raised Catholic.

=== United Kingdom ===
In Great Britain, 37% of people raised Catholic later reported having no religion. Among people raised Catholic, this proportion reached 48% for those born in 1985–1998, compared with 36% for those born in 1945–1964.

=== France ===
In France, a 2019–2020 survey found that 31% of adults raised in Catholic families reported having no religion, while 67% still identified as Catholic.

=== Argentina ===
In Argentina, the Coalición Argentina por un Estado Laico (CAEL) organized a campaign for collective formal apostasy after the Senate rejected a bill to legalize abortion in August 2018. By September, the organization had collected approximately 4,500 requests to leave the Catholic Church; this figure reflects applications rather than confirmed completed departures.

=== Poland ===
In Poland, individuals seeking formal apostasy must follow the procedures established by their religious organization. In the Catholic Church in Poland, a decree that took effect in 2016 requires a written declaration to be submitted personally to the parish priest. Formal apostasy attracted increased public attention during the October 2020 Polish protests, although the number of departures remained small relative to the Church’s reported membership. The Catholic Church does not publish official nationwide statistics on apostasy, although Church records documented approximately 1,050 cases between 2006 and 2009. The procedure does not remove an individual's baptismal record. Instead, a notation of apostasy is added to the register. This has no effect under civil law, while the Church continues to regard the individual as Catholic under canon law.

== See also ==
- Apostasy in Islam
- Apostasy in Judaism
- Backsliding
- Christian atheism
- Christian heresy
- Conditional Preservation of the Saints
- Eternal sin
- Excommunication
- Great Apostasy
- List of former Christians

== Notes and references ==
=== Sources ===
- Acosta Rainis, Federico (13 September 2018). "Apostasía colectiva: por qué creció el interés de renunciar al catolicismo y qué interpretación le da la Iglesia". La Nación (in Spanish).
- Aleteia Polska (28 June 2018). "Apostazja ma poważne konsekwencje. Co oznacza formalne odejście z Kościoła?". Aleteia Polska.
- AG (2017). "Assurance-Of-Salvation: Position paper". AG.
- Aquinas, Thomas (2000). Somme théologique (in French). Vol. 3 (II–II). Paris: Éditions du Cerf. ISBN 9782204022316.
- Barnett, Paul W. (1997). "Apostasy". In Martin, Ralph P.; Davids, Peter H. (eds.). Dictionary of the Later New Testament and its Developments. Downers Grove: InterVarsity Press.
- Bauder, Wolfgang (1975). "Fall, Fall Away". In Brown, Colin (ed.). The New International Dictionary of New Testament Theology. Vol. 1. Grand Rapids: Zondervan.
- Benedict XVI (26 October 2009). "Omnium in mentem". The Holy See.
- Bercot, David W. (1989). Will the Real Heretics Please Stand Up: A New Look at Today's Evangelical Church in the Light of Early Christianity. Amberson: Scroll Publishing Company.
- Bercot, David W. (1998). A Dictionary of Early Christian Beliefs: A Reference Guide to More Than 700 Topics Discussed by the Early Church Fathers. Peabody: Hendrickson Publishers.
- Boettner, Lorraine (1932). The Reformed Doctrine of Predestination. Philadelphia: The Presbyterian and Reformed Publishing Company.
- Bracey, Matthew Steven (25 August 2022). "A Historical Sketch of Thomas Helwys". Helwys Society Forum.
- Bratcher, Robert G. (1983). A Translator's Guide to the Gospel of Luke. London: United Bible Societies.
- Bromiley, Geoffrey W. (1985). Theological Dictionary of the New Testament: Abridged in One Volume. Grand Rapids: Eerdmans.
- Bullivant, Stephen (2019). Mass Exodus: Catholic Disaffiliation in Britain and America since Vatican II. Oxford: Oxford University Press. ISBN 9780198837947.
- Calvin, John (1845). Institutes of the Christian Religion; a New Translation by Henry Beveridge. Vol. 2. Translated by Henry Beveridge. Edinburgh: Calvin Translation Society. books 2, 3.
- Calvin, John (1961). Concerning the Eternal Predestination of God. London: James Clarke & Co. Limited.
- Calvin, John (1963). The Epistle of Paul the Apostle to the Hebrews and the First and Second epistles of St Peter. Translated by W. B. Johnston. Grand Rapids, MI: William B. Eerdmans Publishing Company.
- Catholic Church (1983a). "Code of Canon Law: Book III, canon 751". The Holy See.
- Catholic Church (1983b). "Code of Canon Law: Book I, canon 194". The Holy See.
- Catholic Church (1983c). "Code of Canon Law: Book IV, canon 1184". The Holy See.
- Catholic Church (2021). "Code of Canon Law: Book VI, canon 1364". The Holy See.
- Chadwick, Henry (2001). "Julian and the Church". The Church in Ancient Society: From Galilee to Gregory the Great. Oxford: Oxford University Press. doi:10.1093/0199246955.003.0037.
- Church of England (1571a). "Articles of Religion". The Church of England.
- Church of England (1547). "Homily VIII: Of the Declining from God". Anglican Heritage.
- Church of the Nazarene (2025). "Articles of Faith". Church of the Nazarene.
- Congregation for the Doctrine of the Faith (21 May 2010). "A brief introduction to the modifications made in the Normae de gravioribus delictis, reserved to the Congregation for the Doctrine of the Faith". The Holy See.
- Cottrell, Jack (1996). Romans: Volume 1 & 2 (The College Press NIV Commentary). Joplin: College Press.
- Cottrell, Jack (2002). The Faith Once for All: Bible Doctrine for Today. Joplin: College Press.
- Crisp, Oliver D. (2014). Deviant Calvinism: Broadening Reformed Theology. Minneapolis, MN: Fortress Press.
- Davis, John Jefferson (1991). "The Perseverance of the Saints: A History of the Doctrine" (PDF). Journal of the Evangelical Theological Society. 34 (2): 213–228.
- De Jong, Peter Y. (1968). "The Opinions of the Remonstrants (1618)". Crisis in the Reformed Churches: Essays in Commemoration of the Great Synod of Dordt, 1618–1619. Grand Rapids: Reformed Fellowship.
- Drouhot, Lucas; Simon, Patrick; Tiberj, Vincent (2023). "La diversité religieuse en France : transmissions intergénérationnelles et pratiques selon les origines". Immigrés et descendants d’immigrés en France (PDF). Insee Références (in French). Insee. ISBN 9782111623835.
- Dillow, Joseph C. (1992). The Reign of the Servant Kings: A Study of Eternal Security and the Final Significance of Man. Miami Springs: Schoettle Publishing Company.
- Early, Joe Jr. (2009). The Life and Writings of Thomas Helwys. Macon: Mercer University Press.
- Ellis, Mark A. (2005a). "Introduction". The Arminian Confession of 1621. Eugene: Pickwick Publications.
- Episcopius, Simon (2005). The Arminian Confession of 1621. Translated by Mark A. Ellis. Eugene: Pickwick Publications.
- Evangelical Friends Church - Eastern Region (2018). Faith and Practice. Canton: EFC-ER.
- Farinacci, Prospero (1616). Tractatus de haeresi (in Latin). Antwerp: Joannes Keerbergius.
- Fink, Michael (2003). "Apostasy". In Draper, Charles W.; Brand, Chad; England, Archie (eds.). Holman Illustrated Bible Dictionary. Nashville: Holman Bible Publishers.
- GAGB (1970). "Statements of Faith" (PDF). General Baptist.
- Giesen, Heinz (1993). "σκανδαλίζω / σκάνδαλον". In Balz, Horst; Schneider, Gerhard (eds.). Exegetical Dictionary of the New Testament. Vol. 3. Grand Rapids: Eerdmans.
- Gilbrant, Thoralf (1986). The Complete Biblical Library: Greek-English Dictionary. Vol. 10. Springfield: The Complete Biblical Library.
- Goodwin, John (1840). Redemption Redeemed. London: Thomas Tegg.
- Grantham, Thomas (1678). Christianismus Primitivus. Vol. 2. London: Francis Smith.
- Grantham, Thomas (1691). A Dialogue Between the Baptist and the Presbyterian. London: n.p.
- Gribben, Crawford; Tweeddale, John W. (2022). T&T Clark Handbook of John Owen. London: T&T Clark.
- Grudem, Wayne (1994). Systematic Theology: An Introduction to Biblical Doctrine. Leicester, England & Grand Rapids, MI: Inter-Varsity Press & Zondervan.
- Hodges, Zane C. (1989). Absolutely Free! A Biblical Reply to Lordship Salvation. Grand Rapids: Zondervan.
- Horton, Michael (2011). The Christian Faith: A Systematic Theology for Pilgrims on the Way. Grand Rapids, MI: Zondervan Academic.
- Jacobs, Henry Eyster, ed. (1911). The Book of Concord: Or the Symbolical Books of the Evangelical Lutheran Church. Vol. 1. Philadelphia: United Lutheran Publication House.
- John Paul II (1993). Catechism of the Catholic Church. Vatican City: Libreria Editrice Vaticana.
- Kallestrup, Louise Nyholm; Toivo, Raisa Maria (2017). Contesting Orthodoxy in Medieval and Early Modern Europe: Heresy, Magic and Witchcraft. Cham: Springer.
- Keathley, Kenneth D. (2010). Salvation and Sovereignty: A Molinist Approach. Nashville: B&H Publishing Group.
- Luther, Martin (1921). "The Smalcald Articles". Triglot Concordia: The Symbolical Books of the Evangelical Lutheran Church. Translated by Bente, F.; Dau, W. H. T. St. Louis: Concordia Publishing House.
- Luther, Martin (1949). Commentary on the Epistle to the Galatians (1535). Translated by Theodore Graebner. Grand Rapids: Zondervan.
- Mantsinen, Teemu T.; Tervo-Niemelä, Kati (2020). "Leaving Christianity". In Enstedt, Daniel; Larsson, Göran; Mantsinen, Teemu T. (eds.). Handbook of Leaving Religion. Leiden: Brill. doi:10.1163/9789004331471_007.
- Marsden, George M. (2022). Fundamentalism and American Culture (3rd ed.). New York: Oxford University Press. ISBN 9780197599488.
- Marshall, I. Howard (1969). Kept by the Power of God: A Study of Perseverance and Falling Away. Minneapolis: Bethany Fellowship.
- McKnight, Scot (1992). "The Warning Passages of Hebrews: A Formal Analysis and Theological Conclusions". Trinity Journal. 13 (1): 21–59.
- McKnight, Scot (2005). "Apostasy". In Vanhoozer, Kevin J. (ed.). Dictionary of Theological Interpretation of the Bible. Grand Rapids: Baker Book House.
- Melanchthon, Philip (1995). Annotations on the First Epistle to the Corinthians. Translated by John Patrick Donnelly. Milwaukee: Marquette University Press.
- Melanchthon, Philip (2010). Commentary on Romans. Translated by Fred Kramer. St. Louis: Concordia Publishing House.
- Mennonite Church (1921). Christian Fundamentals. Scottdale: Mennonite General Conference.
- Missionary Church (2011). "The Assurance of the Believer" (PDF). Missionary Church USA.
- Mounce, William D. (2006). Mounce's Complete Expository Dictionary of Old and New Testament Words. Grand Rapids: Zondervan.
- Muller, Richard A. (1985). Dictionary of Greek and Latin Theological Terms: Drawn Principally from Protestant Scholastic Theology. Grand Rapids: Baker Book House.
- NAFWB (2013). A Treatise of the Faith and Practices of the National Association of Free Will Baptists, Inc (PDF). Antioch: NAFWB.
- Oropeza, B. J. (2000). Paul and Apostasy: Eschatology, Perseverance, and Falling Away in the Corinthian Congregation. Tübingen: Mohr Siebeck.
- Oropeza, B. J. (2011). In the Footsteps of Judas and Other Defectors: Apostasy in the New Testament Communities (Vol. 1). Eugene: Cascade Books.
- Oropeza, B. J. (2012a). Churches under Siege of Persecution and Assimilation: Apostasy in the New Testament Communities (Vol. 3). Eugene: Cascade Books.
- Oropeza, B. J. (2012b). Jews, Gentiles, and the Opponents of Paul: Apostasy in the New Testament Communities (Vol. 2). Eugene: Cascade Books.
- Owens, Jesse (23 June 2014). "Thomas Grantham's Christianismus Primitivus". Helwys Society Forum.
- Peck, Anthony A. (2026). "Baptism". In Fiddes, Paul S.; Bebbington, David; Flowers, Elizabeth H.; Harmon, Steven R. (eds.). The Oxford Handbook of Baptist Studies. Oxford University Press. doi:10.1093/9780191946141.003.0016. ISBN 9780192855633.
- Pew Research Center (12 May 2015). "America's Changing Religious Landscape" (PDF). Pew Research Center.
- Pfürtner, Stephen (1964). Luther and Aquinas on Salvation. New York: Sheed and Ward.
- Picirilli, Robert E. (2002). Grace, Faith, Free Will: Contrasting Views of Salvation. Nashville: Randall House Publications.
- Pink, Arthur W. (2001). Eternal Security. Lafayette, IN: Sovereign Grace Publishers, Inc. ISBN 1589601955.
- Pink, Arthur W. (2009). Studies on Saving Faith. Zeeland, MI: Reformed church Publications.
- Polack, Gillian; Kania, Katrin (2015). The Middle Ages Unlocked: A Guide to Life in Medieval England, 1050–1300. Stroud: Amberley Publishing Limited.
- Polish Episcopal Conference (27 September 2008). "Zasady postępowania w sprawie formalnego aktu wystąpienia z Kościoła". Konferencja Episkopatu Polski (in Polish).
- Polish Episcopal Conference (2016). "Dekret Ogólny Konferencji Episkopatu Polski w sprawie wystąpień z Kościoła oraz powrotu do wspólnoty Kościoła" (PDF). Akta Konferencji Episkopatu Polski (in Polish) (27/2015): 101–104.
- Polsat News (26 October 2020). "Apostazja – czym jest i jak wiele osób dokonuje jej w Polsce?". Polsat News.
- Pope, William Burt (1879). A Compendium of Christian Theology. Vol. 3. London: Wesleyan Conference Office.
- Pope, William Burt (1883). A Higher Catechism of Theology. London: T. Woolmer.
- Poutrin, Isabelle (2010). "L'Église et les consentements arrachés. Violence et crainte dans le baptême et l'apostasie (Espagne, XVIe–XVIIe siècle)". Rivista di Storia del Cristianesimo (in French). 7 (2): 489–508.
- Pratt, D. M. (1979). "Apostasy". In Bromiley, Geoffrey W. (ed.). International Standard Bible Encyclopedia. Vol. 1. Grand Rapids: Eerdmans.
- Prawo.pl (26 October 2022). "Apostazja - co chrzest złączył, człowiek łatwo nie rozdzieli". Prawo.pl.
- Roberts, Alexander (1994). Donaldson, James (ed.). Ante-Nicene Fathers. Vol. 1–9. Peabody: Hendrickson Publishers.
- Robertson, Gregory (2005). "Eternal Security: A Biblical and Theological Appraisal" (PDF). Anderson University School of Theology.
- Ryken, Leland; Wilhoit, Jim; Longman, Tremper, eds. (1998). Dictionary of Biblical Imagery. Downers Grove: InterVarsity Press.
- Saliou, Catherine (2020). "Polythéisme, monothéismes : multiplicité des cultes et innovations religieuses". Le Proche-Orient: De Pompée à Muhammad, Ier s. av. J.-C. – VIIe s. apr. J.-C. Mondes anciens (in French). Paris: Belin. ISBN 978-2-7011-9286-4.
- Salvation Army (2010). The Salvation Army Handbook of Doctrine. London: Salvation Books.
- Schaff, Philip (1997). History of the Christian Church. Vol. 3. Oak Harbor, WA: Logos Research Systems.
- Schaff, Philip (2007). "The Five Arminian Articles, A.D. 1610". The Creeds of Christendom. Vol. 3. Grand Rapids, Michigan: Baker Books. ISBN 978-0-8010-8232-0.
- Schreiner, Thomas R.; Caneday, Ardel B. (2001). The Race Set Before Us: A Biblical Theology of Perseverance and Assurance. Downers Grove: InterVarsity Press.
- Scott, Leland (1974). "Perseverance, Final". In Harmon, Nolan B. (ed.). Encyclopedia of World Methodism. Vol. 2. Nashville: The United Methodist Publishing House.
- Simpson, Matthew (1882). Cyclopaedia of Methodism. Philadelphia: Louis H. Everts.
- Stählin, Gustav (1971). "σκάνδαλον / σκανδαλίζω". In Kittel, Gerhard; Friedrich, Gerhard (eds.). Theological Dictionary of the New Testament. Vol. 7. Grand Rapids: Eerdmans.
- Stanglin, Keith D. (2009). "Arminius and Arminianism: An Overview". In Van Lieburg, Fred (ed.). Arminius, Arminianism, and Europe: Jacobus Arminius (1559/60–1609). Leiden: Brill.
- Stanglin, Keith D.; McCall, Thomas H. (15 November 2012). Jacob Arminius: Theologian of Grace. New York: Oxford University Press USA. ISBN 978-0-19-975567-7.
- Stanley, Charles F. (1990). Eternal Security: Can I Be Sure That I'm Going to Heaven?. Zondervon. ISBN 9781418530150.
- Stauffer, J. L. (1933). The Eternal Security Teaching (2nd rev. ed.). Harrisburg: Tract Press.
- Stokes, Mark B. (1990). Major United Methodist Beliefs. Nashville: Abingdon Press.
- Summers, Thomas O. (1888). Systematic Theology: A Complete Body of Wesleyan Arminian Divinity. Vol. 2. Nashville: Methodist Episcopal Church, South.
- Tappert, Theodore G. (1959). The Book of Concord: The Confessions of the Evangelical Lutheran Church. Philadelphia: Fortress Press.
- Thompson, James (2008). Hebrews (Paideia: Commentaries on the New Testament). Grand Rapids: Baker Academic.
- TOK FM (26 October 2020). "Apostazja. W jaki sposób można wypisać się z Kościoła katolickiego?". TOK FM.
- Van Hove, A. (1907). "Apostasy". The Catholic Encyclopedia. New York: Robert Appleton Company.
- Wenger, John Christian (1954). Introduction to Theology: A Brief Introduction to the Doctrinal Content of Scripture Written in the Anabaptist-Mennonite Tradition. Scottdale: Herald Press.
- Werth, Paul W. (2014). The Tsar's Foreign Faiths: Toleration and the Fate of Religious Freedom in Imperial Russia. Oxford: Oxford University Press. ISBN 9780199591770.
- Wilhite, Shawn J. (2019). The Didache: A Commentary. Eugene: Cascade Books.
- Witzki, Steve (2010a). "The Orthodox Church Affirms Conditional Security" (PDF). Society of Evangelical Arminians.
- Witzki, Steve (2010b). "The Arminian Confession of 1621 and Apostasy". Society of Evangelical Arminians.
- Yrigoyen, Charles Jr. (2001). Belief Matters: United Methodism's Doctrinal Standards. Nashville: Abingdon Press.
