= Eternal security =

Christian belief

Eternal security, also known as "once saved, always saved", is the belief providing Christian believers with absolute assurance of their final salvation. Its development, particularly within Protestantism, has given rise to diverse interpretations, especially in relation with the defining aspects of theological determinism, libertarian free will and the significance of personal perseverance.

Before the Reformation, belief in forms of eternal security were anecdotal. In the early 5th century, the Augustinian view of predestination by predetermination emerged as a clearly distinct position, though it did not endorse eternal security. By the 16th century, this concept became integrated into the theology of John Calvin and other reformers. Calvinist circles initially embraced eternal security as one of the practical interpretations of the doctrine of "perseverance of the saints". Over time, the term became a synonym of the Calvinist doctrine of perseverance independently of its practical interpretations.

In the early 20th century, eternal security started to become a defining doctrine of the Southern Baptist traditionalism. Around the same period, it also became part of Plymouth Brethren theology. Those two forms represents its predominant forms today. In the 1980s, the Free Grace movement voiced this doctrine independently of the notion of personal perseverance, with subsequent variations emerging such as the "Hyper-Grace" teaching.

== Definition and terminology ==
=== Definition ===
Eternal security is a doctrine providing believers with absolute assurance of their ineluctable final salvation.

The concept of "eternal security" emerging around 1900 within different Evangelical groups, represents its current prevailing form within Protestantism. Indeed, the first documented occurrences of the terms supporting this concept were "security of the believers" in 1873 within Southern Baptist circles and "eternal security" in 1913 within Plymouth Brethren circles. This predominant form entails an unconditional eternal security which is not grounded on a Calvinist theology.

=== Views ===
This doctrine's development within Protestantism has led to various interpretations, especially related to the significance of theological determinism, libertarian free will, and personal perseverance:

1. Eternal security based on the faith that the believer is an elect by divine determination. (Calvinist circles, minority view).
2. Eternal security based on the faith that regeneration leads to unconditional perseverance and then salvation. (Non-Calvinist circles, majority view).
3. Eternal security based on the faith that regeneration leads to salvation independently of perseverance. (Non-Calvinist circles, currently growing Free Grace view).

Alternative perspectives on eternal security have been proposed, some within classical theism, such as Karl Barth's implicit Christian universalism, while others lie outside of classical theism, as seen in Process Theism.

=== Terminology ===
Because one practical interpretation of the Calvinist doctrine of "perseverance of the saints" leads to "eternal security", over time, the term became synonymous with the doctrine itself. By the early 20th century, "eternal security" was used as a strict synonym for "perseverance of the saints". However, given the theological significance of the term "eternal security" in common usage, it's important to distinguish them. Indeed, some Calvinist theologians reject the use of "eternal security" for their doctrine, as do proponents of non-Calvinist forms of eternal security.

The non-Calvinist forms of eternal security have been categorized by some theologians as "sub-Calvinist", or "neo-Calvinist". This terminology reflects their more recent emergence and their historical connection to Calvinist theology.

== Historical influences and developments ==
=== Manichean theological influences ===
Manichaeism was a Gnostic sect founded in the 3rd century. It significantly influenced early Christian churches, promoting spiritual practices like asceticism and sacerdotalism. Manichaeism adopted a dualistic worldview, contrasting a spiritual realm of good with a material realm of evil, anticipating the gradual restoration of light from the material to the spiritual realm. In terms of soteriology, it maintained that God unilaterally selected the elect for salvation and the non-elect for damnation according to His will. For instance, in 392, a Manichean presbyter said that "God [...] has chosen souls worthy of Himself according to His own holy will. [...] that under His leadership those souls will return hence again to the kingdom of God according to the holy promise of Him who said: “I am the way, the truth, and the door”; and “No one can come unto the Father, except through me.”".

=== Augustine's doctrine of election by predetermination ===
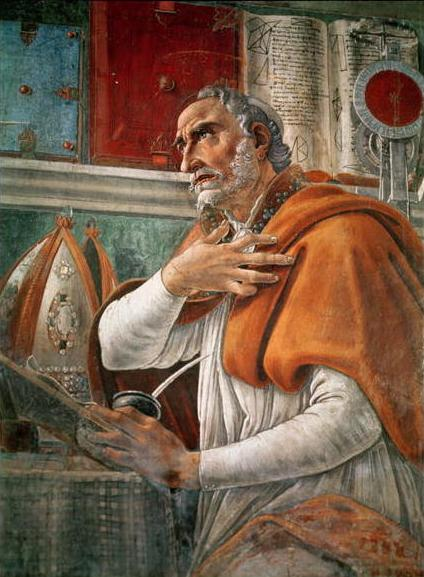
Botticelli, Sandro. (c. 1480) Saint Augustine in His Study

Before his conversion to Christianity in 387, Augustine of Hippo (354–430), adhered to three deterministic philosophies: Stoicism, Neoplatonism and Manichaeism, being significantly influenced by them. In particular, he seemed to adopt Manichean perspectives on various theological aspects, notably on the nature of good and evil, the separation of groups into elect, hearers, and sinners, the hostility to the flesh and sexual activity, and his dualistic theology. After his conversion, he taught traditional Christian theology against forms of theological determinism until 412.

However, during his conflict with the Pelagians, he seemed to reintroduce certain Manichean principles into his thought, and was accused by his opponents for so doing. Augustine's change in stance was notably influenced by the controversy over infant baptism with the Pelagians. Augustine's early exposure to Stoicism, which emphasized meticulous divine predeterminism, further shaped his views on infant baptism. Moreover, according to Manichean doctrine, unborn and unbaptized infants were condemned to hell due to their physical bodies. He asserted that God predetermined parents to seek baptism for their newborns, thereby linking water baptism to regeneration. It is then God who ultimately predetermines which infants are damned and which are justified.

Augustine had to explain why some baptized individuals continued in the faith while others fell away and lived immoral lives. He taught that among those regenerated through baptism, some are given an additional gift of perseverance (donum perseverantiae) which enables them to maintain their faith and prevents them from falling away. Without this second gift, a baptized Christian with the Holy Spirit would not persevere and ultimately would not be saved. Augustine developed this doctrine of perseverance in De correptione et gratia (c. 426–427). While this doctrine theoretically gives security to the elect who receive the gift of perseverance, individuals cannot ascertain whether they have received it.

=== Views asserting eternal security independently of perseverance ===
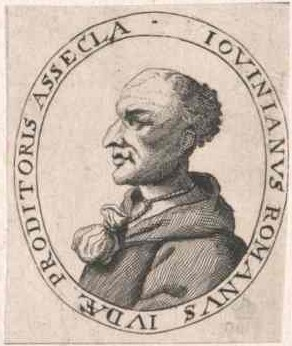
Portrait of Jovinian, c. 1700

Origen (185 – c. 253) in his day mentioned individuals who denied any future judgement based on works. He refers to them in his commentary on Romans 10:9. While not considered heretical, he rejected their views, emphasizing that faith must be expressed through the actions of believers to be meaningful.

In Augustine's day, multiple viewpoints on the possibility of eternal damnation were discussed. One viewpoint posited that being baptized and partaking in the Lord's body within the Church served as absolute assurance of salvation, extending even to those who became heretics. Another viewpoint, emerging in the early church, advocated for forgiveness in salvation despite moral failings. According to this view, even if a Christian lived a life marked by significant disobedience, their salvation could still be guaranteed as long as they remained within the Church. Augustine disputed these ideas, suggesting they arose from a misunderstanding of God's compassion and a misinterpretation of 1 Corinthians 3:11–15. This passage was used to argue that faith alone could secure salvation, even if one's actions were morally evil. Augustine in his criticism of these views does not mention exact names. Nevertheless, both Jerome (c. 342–347 – 420) and Ambrose (c. 339–397) shared in the doctrine that all those who have trusted in Christ would eventually be reunited to God and saved sooner or later, even if they have sinned and fallen away. An alternative interpretation suggests that Ambrose held Christian universalist beliefs.

Jovinian (died c. 405) maintained that a genuinely regenerated person who undergoes baptism cannot be lost, writing: "Those, who are once with full faith born again by baptism, cannot be overcome by the devil". His theory is not directly tied to the Augustinian idea of perseverance but rather stems from his denial of works having merit. A Pseudo-Chrysostom author from the 5th to 6th century suggested that Christians could enter heaven though without experiencing Christ's glory, even if they break his commandments, as implied by a commentary on Matthew 5:19.

=== Proponents of Augustinian view of predestination ===
Between the 5th century and the Reformation in the 16th century, theologians who upheld the belief in election by predetermination, following the Augustinian teaching, included: Gottschalk (c. 808–868), Ratramnus (died 868), Thomas Bradwardine (1300–1349), Gregory of Rimini (1300–1358), John Wycliffe (1320s – 1384), Johann Ruchrat von Wesel (died 1481), Girolamo Savonarola (1452–1498) and Johannes von Staupitz (1460–1524).

== Eternal security based on election by predetermination ==
=== The Calvinist doctrine of perseverance of the saints ===
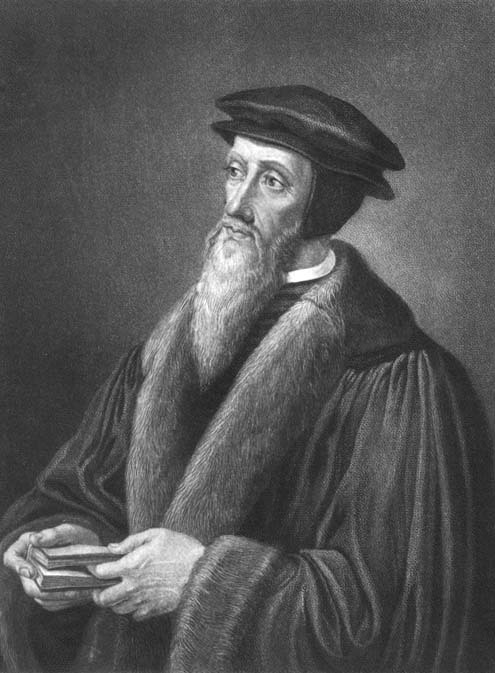
Portrait of John Calvin. In: (1909) Iconographie calvinienne: ouvrage dédié à l'Université de Genève

Orthodox forms of Calvinism view God's providence as expressed through theological determinism. This means that every event in the world is determined by God. Concerning salvation, Calvin expressly taught that it is God's decision to determine whether an individual is saved or damned. Indeed, human actions leading to this end are also predetermined by God. In accordance, he held to the doctrine of perseverance of the saints, contending for the unconditional preservation of the elect.

=== Practical interpretations of the doctrine of perseverance of the saints ===
==== Practical interpretation rejecting an absolute assurance of salvation ====
According to Calvinism, apostasy is not possible for those who are true Christians. However, being a true Christian is only demonstrated by perseverance to the end. This arises because there are instances where individuals appear to come to God but later display definitive apostasy. To address this phenomenon, Calvinist theologians have postulated that common grace might include effects that cannot be distinguished from effectual calling and subsequent irresistible grace. About that issue, Calvin formulated the concept of a temporary grace (sometimes called "evanescent grace") that appears and works for only a while in the reprobate but then to disappears. According to this concept, the Holy Spirit can create in some people effects which are indistinguishable from those of the irresistible grace of God, producing also a visible "fruit" in their life. Temporary grace was also supported by later Calvinist theologians such as Theodore Beza, William Perkins, John Owen, A. W. Pink and Loraine Boettner. This suggests that the knowledge of being a true Christian is theoretically not accessible during life. Thus a first interpretation of the doctrine of perseverance of the saints acknowledges explanations of apparent apostasy like "evanescent grace," which avoids offering to the believer absolute assurance of salvation during life. Several Reformed theologians have expressed a non-absolute assurance of salvation view.

==== Practical interpretation supporting an eternal security view ====
Calvin heavily drew upon Augustinian soteriology. However, both Augustine and Luther, an Augustinian friar, held that believers, based on their own understanding, cannot definitively know if they are among the "elect to perseverance." Despite Calvin's inability to offer a clear rationale, he was more optimistic than Luther regarding this possibility. Calvin suggested that some assurance of being an elect might be possible. This possibility of assurance, based on personal introspection, was also expressed by later Calvinist theologians. It was mentioned in the Heidelberg Catechism (1563) and the Westminster Confession of Faith (1646). In the 18th century, Hyper-Calvinism encouraged introspection as a means for adherents to determine their election. The concept persisted into the 19th century. This assurance forms the foundation of unconditional eternal security within Calvinist circles.

The process leading to eternal security unfolds as follows: Initially, the believer must embrace the Calvinist system, emphasizing unconditional election and irresistible grace. Subsequently, through self-examination, they must discern the spiritual influence of the Holy Spirit. This introspection may lead to a faith in their own predetermined election. In this context, the concept of the perseverance of the saints may prompt the believer to believe in their irresistible perseverance.

Because this practical interpretation of the doctrine of "perseverance of the saints" leads to "eternal security", within Reformed Christianity, the term has become synonymous with the doctrine itself over time. By the early 20th century, "eternal security" was used as a strict synonym for "perseverance of the saints". Besides, in broader Protestantism, "eternal security" often carries a distinct meaning. It's then important to differentiate the two due to their respective theological significance.

==== Historical acknowledgment of the interpretations ====
In Calvinist circles, thus, two practical interpretations emerge regarding "perseverance of the saints": One interpretation accept explanations of apparent apostasy such as "evanescent grace," which does not offer believers absolute assurance of salvation during life. The other interpretation rejects these explanations, asserting that believers, through introspection, can know with absolute certainty that they are elect, thus allowing belief in eternal security. These two perspectives were already observed in the 16th century. Jacobus Arminius (1560–1609), a pastor of the Reformed Church, encountered both perspectives stemming from the doctrine of perseverance of the saints. He labeled the first perspective "despair" (Latin: desperatio) and the second "security" (Latin: securitas). This "eternal security" interpretation of perseverance of the saints was also explicitly condemned by the Council of Trent (1545–1563).

=== Groups adhering to the view ===
The "eternal security" view related to perseverance of the saints globally persists within Calvinist circles to this day. The Primitive Baptists, originating in Georgia in the early 20th century, officially embraced this form of eternal security due to their strong Calvinist beliefs. Eternal security is also defended in variations of Calvinist theology, such as its recent Molinist forms.

=== Objections to the view ===
The doctrine of eternal security stemming from the perseverance of the saints, has faced criticism for its perceived inconsistency. According to orthodox Calvinism, though an elect possesses "eternal security," believers cannot know they are elect until they persevere to the end. Regardless of the rationale given for the phenomenon of definitive apostasy, this reality undermines the practical utility of perseverance of the saints in a believer's life, hindering the assurance of salvation and eternal security. This critique has been advanced by proponents of non-Calvinistic forms of eternal security, as well as various Christian groups opposing any form of eternal security, such as Arminians.

== Eternal security based on inevitable perseverance due to regeneration ==
=== Southern Baptism theology ===
==== Departure from the Calvinist paradigm ====
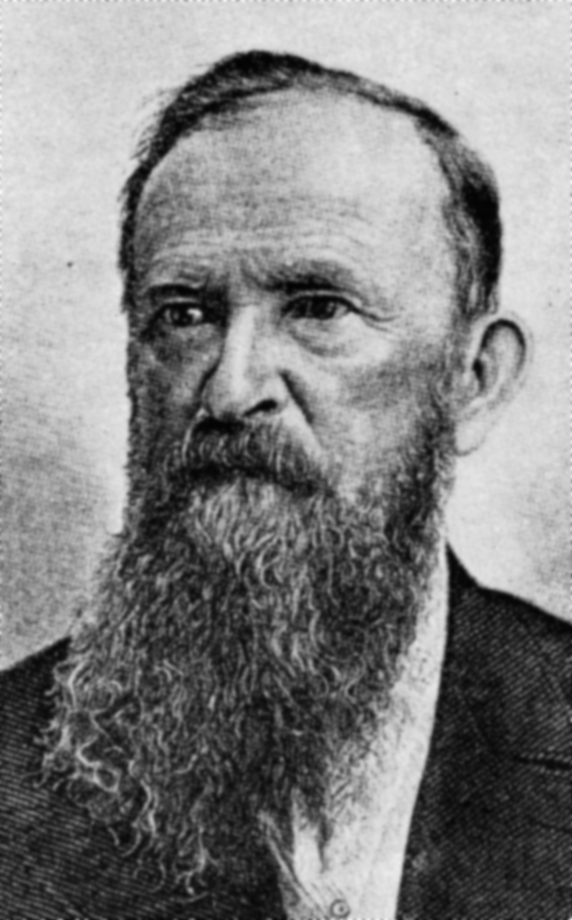
James Robinson Graves. In: (1900) Pillars of orthodoxy.

In the 19th century, due to the rise of evangelism and missionary work, the doctrine of "perseverance of the saints" fell out of favor. From the 1830s, a departure from strict Calvinism began in the Southern Baptist circles. In this context, the first uses of the term "security of the believer" can be found as early as 1841. In 1845, the Southern Baptist Convention (SBC), was founded. Southern Baptist theology started to be modeled, notably by men such as James Robinson Graves and W. P. Bennett, who first used the terminology of "security of the believers" related to a non-Calvinist worldview, in 1873 and 1895. Actually, Graves, initially a strong Calvinist, later leaned toward libertarianism. He also adopted dispensationalism and began to write on it in the 1870s.

==== Further developments ====
Similarly, other SBC theologians from the early twentieth century also moved away from Calvinism theology, maintaining only the determinist concept of "perseverance of the saints" within a libertarian worldview. This shift led to the popular phrase "once saved, always saved" to describe the idea of "security of the believer". In the resulting hybrid theology, individuals have the libertarian freedom to choose faith through divine grace. However, regardless of subsequent actions after regeneration, whether they continue to believe or cease, they will always end up being restored in their faith. Consequently, many Southern Baptists align with a "four-point Arminianism" perspective. Furthermore, many Southern Baptists believe that the Holy Spirit preparation for faith, is exclusively through the gospel. This narrower view than the Arminian one is included in the notion of Southern Baptist traditionalism. Nevertheless, traditionalism is essentially characterized by a soteriology asserting eternal security for the regenerated individual.

==== Adhesion to the view ====
The majority of Southern Baptists embrace a traditionalist form of Arminianism which includes a belief in eternal security, though many see Calvinism as growing in acceptance.

=== Plymouth Brethren theology ===
==== Calvinistic dispensationalism ground ====
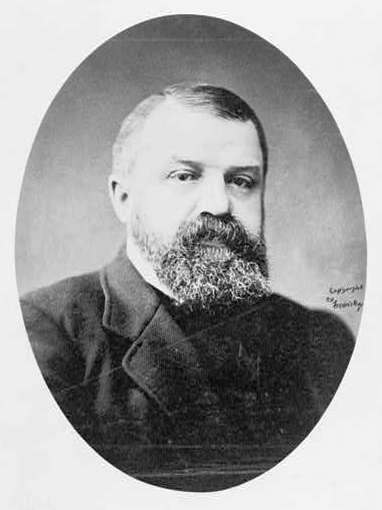
Dwight L. Moody (c. 1900)

Dispensationalism emerged within the Reformed community, and the majority of its followers during its first century were from Calvinist backgrounds. It developed as a system from the teachings of John Nelson Darby (1800–1882), himself an Anglican Calvinist, and leader of the Plymouth Brethren group. It was then diffused through the Bible of C. I. Scofield (1843–1921), a Presbyterian minister, with Calvinist leanings. Dwight L. Moody (1837–1899) adopted Brethren eschatology, contributing to the initial popularity of dispensationalism in America during the revival linked to him.

==== Emergence of eternal security ====
Dispensationalism provided a framework for reconciling the Calvinistic concept of perseverance of the saints with libertarian free will. According to Henry Orton Wiley, the Plymouth Brethren's doctrine of sanctification, emphasizes believers being declared righteous and sanctified. Holiness is therefore imputed rather than imparted. This eternal "position" logically leads to the doctrine of "eternal security." While initially embraced by Calvinists, dispensationalism was later adopted by Arminians, who retained the concept of "eternal security." Moody's theology exemplified this specific synthesis between Calvinism and Arminianism.

In this context, the term "eternal security" first appeared among the Plymouth Brethren in 1913. In the 1920s, amidst the fundamentalist–modernist controversy, dispensationalism gained traction as a conservative, Bible-centered defense against liberal criticism, appealing to fundamentalists, Pentecostals, and others seeking to uphold traditional beliefs in the face of modern challenges. One of the first non-Calvinist groups to adopt a dispensational orientation can be found among some Pentecostals in the mid-1920s. Started in the late 1930s, by the 1980s, the purge of dispensationalism from Reformed Christianity was largely completed.

==== Adhesion to the view ====
After 1845, internal disputes split the Brethren into Exclusive and Open Brethren. The majority of Exclusive Brethren are moderate Calvinists. Open Brethren are four-point Arminians, upholding the concept of eternal security. This doctrine asserts that those genuinely regenerated will ultimately persevere. Harry A. Ironside can be mentioned as a notable advocate of this perspective.

=== Objection to the views ===
This perspective on eternal security asserts the existence of libertarian free will, alongside the inevitability of the final perseverance. However, the concept of inevitable perseverance raises concerns about human free will, potentially negating its libertarian nature and associated responsibility, a critique voiced by Arminians. Calvinists view divine control as respecting human responsibility while ensuring final preservation, aligning with their semicompatibilist theological determinism, and affirming its more logical legitimacy.

== Eternal security based on regeneration independently of perseverance ==
=== Free Grace theology ===
==== Modern movement view ====
Lewis Sperry Chafer (c. 1929)

The modern Free Grace movement originated primarily from the perspective of some faculty members at Dallas Theological Seminary, notably through the writings of Lewis Sperry Chafer (1871–1952) and the influential advocacy of Zane C. Hodges (1932–2008). It is commonly associated with the Lordship salvation controversy which began in the late 1970’s to early 1980’s. However, earlier individuals such as Robert Sandeman (1718–1771) and Robert Govett (1813–1901) are often seen as having had similar views prior to the modern form of Free Grace theology. This view has been associated with numerous dispensational theologians, such as Charles Ryrie, Norman Geisler and Charles Stanley. Some prominent Independent Baptists, including Jack Hyles and Curtis Hutson, have also advocated similar views.

Free Grace theology teaches that regeneration leads to salvation independently of personal perseverance. Free Grace theologians generally interpret warnings such as is found in Hebrews as either referring to temporary discipline for disobedient Christians or to a loss of eternal reward at the judgement seat of Christ, instead of as referring to a loss of salvation. Free Grace doctrine views the person's character and life after receiving the gift of salvation as independent from the gift itself, or in other words, it asserts that justification does not necessarily result in sanctification. Some advocates of the Free Grace perspective argue that while works may always accompany saving faith, they are not necessarily its direct consequence, while others maintain that works are neither automatic nor essential.

==== Groups adhering to the view ====
Free Grace theology has been mainly taught by individuals among: Southern Baptists, Independent Baptists, Plymouth Brethren, Calvary Chapel churches, non-Denominational churches, Churches affiliated with Florida Bible College, Bible churches, Local churches influenced by Watchman Nee, Doctrinal Churches influenced by R. B. Thieme and other Independent churches.

=== Hyper-Grace theology ===
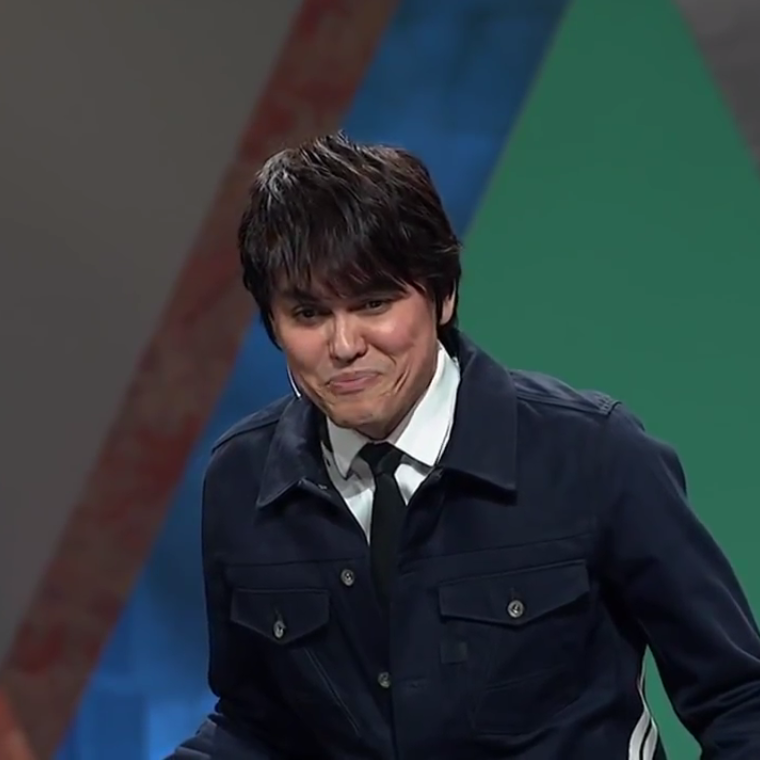
Joseph Prince at the Grace Revolution Conference (2015)

The term "Hyper-Grace" has been applied to a doctrine taught by some Charismatic Christians today, such as Joseph Prince. Although the term was made by critics of the view, it has been embraced by some of those who teach it. Hyper-Grace teaches a strong form of eternal security, views fellowship with God as unconditional and denies that Christians in eternity will have different degrees of rewards. While resembling Free Grace theology, the latter differs by acknowledging the possibility of significant temporal consequences for sins experienced by Christians.

=== Objection to the views ===
Views that downplay the importance of perseverance, holding that eternal security is solely ensured by initial faith regardless of one's actions, are indicative of antinomianism. Many Christians argue that this perspective weakens the gospel message by neglecting the call for unbelievers to repent of their sins, thereby offering a false promise of eternal life. This criticism has been voiced across various Christian denominations, including by both Arminians and Calvinists within Protestantism.

== Theologies generally rejecting eternal security views ==
=== Early Church theology ===
In early Christianity spanning up to the First Council of Nicaea in 325, various perspectives on salvation existed. However, the prevailing view among many early Christian figures such as Clement of Rome (c. 35–99), Polycarp (69–155), Epistle of Barnabas (Between 70 and 132), Ignatius of Antioch (died c. 108/140), Hermas (2nd century), Justin Martyr (100 – c. 165), Clement of Alexandria (150 – c. 215), Tertullian (c. 155 – c. 220), Hippolytus of Rome (c. 170 – c. 235), Origen (c. 185 – c. 253), Cyprian (c. 210 - 258), Lactantius (c. 250 – c. 325) and Eusebius (c. 260/265 – 339) emphasized the importance of works and obedience for salvation. According to this view, believer's faith leads to righteous deeds, while the absence of faith results in apostasy. This perspective contrasts with the notion of eternal security.

=== Catholic theology ===
In Catholicism, Christians do not have eternal security because they can commit a mortal sin. The Church teaches that Christians may undergo the cleansing process of purgatory to attain the required holiness for entry into heaven.

=== Orthodox theology ===
The Eastern Orthodox Churches and the Oriental Orthodox Churches teach "the conditional security of the believer". "According to [...] all of the Church’s spiritual writers, a man must be humble in order to stay on the right path and attain that for which he seeks."

=== Lutheran theology ===
The Lutheran Churches teach that true Christian believers can fall away from the faith into apostasy.

=== Anabaptist theology ===
Anabaptist theology shares certain soteriological similarities with Arminianism. It traditionally teaches conditional security. In particular, Mennonite soteriology has been historically consistent with Arminianism, whereas the doctrines of Calvinist soteriology have been rejected. However in the 20th century, particularly in North America, some Mennonites, have adopted the doctrine of eternal security.

=== Arminian theology ===
Arminianism upholds conditional security, affirming the possibility of apostasy. Arminians believe that a true Christian can fall from grace and be damned and oppose any concept of eternal security. Moreover, they stress that justification alone is insufficient during Christian journey. This viewpoint, especially emphasized by Wesleyan-Arminians, underscores the necessary transformative process of sanctification. In this framework, the believer's assurance rests solely on their present relationship with Christ by grace through faith. In other words, for Arminians, assurance is grounded in the evidence of ongoing sanctification.

== General objections ==
=== Tension in the subject of faith ===
In the different views on eternal security, Arminians often note a tension between present faith in Jesus and faith in a past event. In the Calvinist version, this event seems to be election. In the non-Calvinist versions, the past event is regeneration. Both types of faith in a past event appear to hold equal significance in ensuring final salvation alongside the present faith in Jesus. Arminians contend that genuine faith should be unique and focused solely on Jesus.

=== A form of Christian universalism ===
The different views on eternal security affirm the universal forgiveness of sins from birth to death, grounded in faith in a single past event (election or regeneration). This parallels the concept of Christian universalism, suggesting a universal forgiveness of sins from birth to death.

== See also ==
- Backsliding
- Conditional preservation of the saints
- Five Crowns
- Perseverance of the saints

== Notes and references ==
=== Sources ===
- Adam, Alfred (1968). Das Fortwirken des Manichäismus bei Augustin (in German). Gütersloh: Mohn.
- Alexander, David; Johnson, Daniel (2016). Calvinism and the Problem of Evil. Eugene, OR: Pickwick Publication.
- Anderson, David R. (2017). "The Faith that Saves". In Chay, Fred (ed.). A Defense of Free Grace Theology: With Respect to Saving Faith, Perseverance, and Assurance. The Woodlands, TX: Grace Theology Press. ISBN 978-0-9981385-4-1.
- Arendzen, John (1913). "Manichæism" . In Herbermann, Charles (ed.). Catholic Encyclopedia. Vol. 9. New York: Robert Appleton Company.
- Ashby, Stephen M. (2002). Pinson, J. Matthew (ed.). Four Views on Eternal Security. Grand Rapids, MI: Zondervan.
- Augustine; Lombardo, Gregory J. (1988). On Faith and Works. New York, NY: Paulist Press. ISBN 978-0-8091-0406-2.
- Augustine (1994). The Works of Saint Augustine: A New Translation for the 21st Century. Translated by Hill, Edmund. Hyde Park, NY: New City Press.
- Bangs, Carl (1985). Arminius: A Study in the Dutch Reformation. Eugene: Wipf & Stock.
- Bender, Harold S. (1953). "Arminianism". Global Anabaptist Mennonite Encyclopedia Online.
- Bercot, David W. (1989). Will the Real Heretics Please Stand Up: A New Look at Today's Evangelical. Tyler, TX: Scroll Publishing Co.
- Boettner, Lorraine (1932). The Reformed Doctrine of Predestination. Philadelphia: The Presbyterian and Reformed Publishing Company.
- Bonner, Gerald (1999). Bright, Pamela (ed.). Augustine and the Bible. Notre Dame, IN: University of Notre Dame Press.
- Bowman, Donna (2009). "Eternal Security from the Perspective of Process Theology". Perspectives on Eternal Security: Biblical, Historical, and Philosophical. Eugene, OR: Wipf and Stock Publishers.
- Britain, Joseph F. (1827). "Election". The Calvinistic Magazine. 1–2.
- Burnell, Peter (2005). The Augustinian Person. Washington, D.C.: The Catholic University of America Press.
- Brown, Michael L. (2014). Hyper-Grace: Exposing the Dangers of the Modern Grace Message. Lake Mary: Charisma Media.
- Brown, Michael L. (2016). The Grace Controversy: Answers to 12 Common Questions. Lake Mary: Charisma Media. ISBN 978-1-62998-920-4.
- Calvin, John (1845). Institutes of the Christian Religion; a New Translation by Henry Beveridge. Vol. 2. Translated by Henry Beveridge. Edinburgh: Calvin Translation Society. books 2, 3.
- Calvin, John (1961). Concerning the Eternal Predestination of God. London: James Clarke & Co. Limited.
- Calvin, John (1963). The Epistle of Paul the Apostle to the Hebrews and the First and Second epistles of St Peter. Translated by W. B. Johnston. Grand Rapids, MI: William B. Eerdmans Publishing Company.
- Chadwick, Henry (1965). "Justin Martyr's Defence of Christianity". Bulletin of the John Rylands Library. 47 (2): 275–297. doi:10.7227/BJRL.47.2.3.
- Chadwick, Henry (1986). Augustine: A Very Short Introduction. Oxford, UK: Oxford University Press.
- Chadwick, Henry (1993). The Early Church. London: Penguin books.
- Chay, Fred (2017). "The Perennial Problem for Protestants". In Chay, Fred (ed.). A Defense of Free Grace Theology: With Respect to Saving Faith, Perseverance, and Assurance. The Woodlands, TX: Grace Theology Press. ISBN 978-0-9981385-4-1.
- Christie-Murray, David (1989). A history of heresy. Oxford; New York: Oxford University Press.
- CRC (1988). "The Heidelberg Catechism". Ecumenical Creeds and Reformed Confessions. Grand Rapids: CRC Publications.
- Cross, F. L. (2005). The Oxford dictionary of the Christian church. New York: Oxford University Press.
- Davis, John Jefferson (1991). "The Perseverance of the Saints: A History of the Doctrine" (PDF). Journal of the Evangelical Theological Society. 34 (2).
- dePrater, William A. (2015). God Hovered Over the Waters: The Emergence of the Protestant Reformation. Eugene, OR: Wipf and Stock Publishers. ISBN 978-1-4982-0454-5.
- Dillow, Joseph (2014). Final Destiny: The Future Reign of the Servant Kings. Colorado Springs, CO: Paniym Group.
- Eby, Edwin R. (2020). "How Secure Is a Believer?". Anabaptist Resources.
- Ellis, Jim (2008). "What is Hyper-Calvinism?". Reformed Perspectives Magazine. 10 (15).
- Ellis, Paul (2014-04-02). The Hyper-Grace Gospel: A Response to Michael Brown and Those Opposed to the Modern Grace Message. Birkenhead [Auckland]: KingsPress. ISBN 978-1-927230-40-4.
- EncyclopaediaE (2024a). "Gregory Of Rimini". Encyclopædia Britannica.
- EncyclopaediaE (2024b). "Ratramnus". Encyclopædia Britannica.
- Garrett, James Leo Jr. (2009). Baptist Theology: A Four-Century Study. Macon, GA: Mercer University Press. ISBN 978-0-88146-129-9.
- Garrett, James Leo; Hinson, E. Glenn; Tull (1983). Are Southern Baptists "Evangelicals"?. Macon, GA: Mercer University Press.
- Geisler, Norman L. (2002). Pinson, J. Matthew (ed.). Four Views on Eternal Security. Grand Rapids, MI: Zondervan.
- Geisler, Norman L. (August 2010). Chosen But Free: A Balanced View of God's Sovereignty and Free Will. Bloomingston: Bethany House. ISBN 978-0-7642-0844-7.
- Geisler, Norman (2021). Systematic Theology: In One Volume. Minneapolis: Bastion Books. ISBN 978-1-7376546-0-5.
- Goddard, John Howard (1948). The Contribution of John Nelson Darby to Soteriology, Ecclesiology, and Eschatology. [s.l.]: Dallas Theological Seminary.
- Gribben, Crawford; Tweeddale, John W. (2022). T&T Clark Handbook of John Owen. London: T&T Clark.
- Grudem, Wayne (1994). Systematic Theology: An Introduction to Biblical Doctrine. Leicester, England & Grand Rapids, MI: Inter-Varsity Press & Zondervan.
- Grudem, Wayne (2016). "Free Grace" Theology: 5 Ways it Diminishes the Gospel. Wheaton, IL: Crossway.
- Hägglund, Bengt (2007) [1968]. Teologins historia [History of Theology] (4 ed.). St. Louis, MO: Concordia Publishing House. ISBN 978-0758613486.
- Haight, Roger D. (1974). "Notes on the Pelagian Controversy". Philippine Studies. 22 (1): 26–48. doi:10.13185/2244-1638.1913. JSTOR 426345413.
- Hanegraaf, Wouter J., ed. (2005). Dictionary of Gnosis and Western Esotericism. Vol. 2. Leiden: Brill.
- Hanson, J. W. (1899). "18. Additional Authorities". Universalism: The Prevailing Doctrine of The Christian Church During Its First Five Hundred Years. Boston and Chicago: Universalist Publishing House.
- Harwood, Adam (2016). "Is the traditional Statement Semi-Pelagian". In Allen, David L. (ed.). Anyone Can Be Saved: A Defense of "Traditional" Southern Baptist Soteriology. Eugene, OR: Wipf and Stock Publishers. ISBN 978-1-4982-8516-2.
- Helm, Paul (2010). Calvin at the Center. Oxford: Oxford University Press.
- Henkins, Eric (2016). "Southern Baptists' Core Soteriological Conviction and Contributions". In Allen, David L. (ed.). Anyone Can Be Saved: A Defense of "Traditional" Southern Baptist Soteriology. Eugene, OR: Wipf and Stock Publishers. ISBN 978-1-4982-8516-2.
- Horton, Michael (2002). Pinson, J. Matthew (ed.). Four Views on Eternal Security. Grand Rapids, MI: Zondervan.
- Hummel, Daniel G. (2023). The Rise and Fall of Dispensationalism: How the Evangelical Battle over the End Times Shaped a Nation. Grand Rapids, MI: Eerdmans. ISBN 978-0-802-87922-6.
- Hunt, Dave (2002). What Love is This?: Calvinism's Misrepresentation of God. Sisters, OR: Loyal Pub.
- Hunt, Dave; White, James (2009). Debating Calvinism: Five Points, Two Views. Colorado Springs, CO: Crown Publishing Group.
- Hunter, David G. (2007-01-26). Marriage, Celibacy, and Heresy in Ancient Christianity: The Jovinianist Controversy. Oxford: Oxford University Press. ISBN 978-0-19-153553-6.
- Ice, Thomas (2009). "The Calvinistic Heritage of Dispensationalism". Article Archives (11). Liberty University.
- Ironside, H. A. (1934). Eternal Security of the Believer (PDF). Neptune, NJ: Loizeaux Br.
- Jacobs, Henry Eyster, ed. (1911). The Book of Concord: Or the Symbolical Books of the Evangelical Lutheran Church. Vol. 1. Philadelphia: United Lutheran Publication House.
- James, Frank A. III (1998). Peter Martyr Vermigli and Predestination: The Augustinian Inheritance of an Italian Reformer. Oxford: Clarendon.
- John Paul II (1993). Catechism of the Catholic Church Second Edition Apostolic Constitution Fidei Depositum. Citta del Vaticano: Libreria Editrice Vaticana.
- Johnson, Greg (2008). "67. Is perseverance of the saints the same thing as eternal security?". Monergism.
- Keathley, Kenneth D. (2010). Salvation and Sovereignty: A Molinist Approach. Nashville: B&H Publishing Group.
- Kelly, J. N. D. (2000). Early Christian Doctrines. London: A&C Black. ISBN 978-0-8264-5252-8.
- Kurian, George Thomas; Day, Sarah Claudine (2017). The Essential Handbook of Denominations and Ministries. Grand Rapids, MI: Baker Books.
- Latourette, Kenneth Scott (1945). A History of the Expansion of Christianity. New York: Harper & Bros. OCLC 277266105.
- Lazar, Shawn (2017-10-18). "Wrath and Righteousness". Grace Evangelical Society.
- Lazar, Shawn (24 August 2021). "Are There Any Free Grace Denominations?". Grace Evangelical Society.
- Lehman, Chester K. (1956). "Eternal Security". The Mennonite Encyclopedia: A Comprehensive Reference Work on the Anabaptist-Mennonite Movement. Vol. 2. Scottsdale: Mennonite Publishing House.
- Lemke, Steve (2010). "Salvation and Sovereignty: A Review Essay". Journal for Baptist Theology and Ministry. 7 (1).
- Leonard, Bill J. (1990). God's Last and Only Hope: The Fragmentation of the Southern Baptist Convention. Grand Rapids, MI: W.B. Eerdmans.
- MacGregor, Kirk R. (2023). "Fallen Humanity and Its Redemption: Mainstream Sixteenth-Century Anabaptist Views vis-à-vis Arminian Baptist and Traditional Baptist Positions" (PDF). The Journal for Baptist Theology and Ministry. 20 (2): 173–188.
- Makidon, Michael D. (2002). "From Perth to Pennsylvania: The Legacy Of Robert Sandeman". Journal of the Grace Evangelical Society. 15 (1).
- Marsden, George M. (1982). Fundamentalism and American Culture: The Shaping of Twentieth Century Evangelicalism, 1870-1925. Oxford: Oxford University Press. ISBN 978-0-19-503083-9.
- Marshall, I. Howard (1969). Kept by the power of God : a study of perseverance and falling away. London: Epworth Publishing.
- McCann, Christine (2009). "The Influence of Manichaeism on Augustine of Hippo as a Spiritual Mentor". Cistercian Studies Quarterly. 44 (3): 255–277.
- McGrath, Alister (1998). Iustitia Dei : a history of the Christian doctrine of justification. Cambridge: Cambridge University Press.
- McKinley, O. Glenn (1965). Where Two Creeds Meet (PDF). Kansas City, MO: Beacon Hill Press of Kansas City.
- McKnight, Scot (2013). A Long Faithfulness: The Case For Christian Perseverance. Colorado Springs, CO: Patheos Press. ISBN 978-1-629-21469-6.
- McMahon, C. Matthew (2012). Augustine's Calvinism: The Doctrines of Grace in Augustine's Writings. Coconut Creek, FL: Puritan Publications.
- Moody, Dale (1990). The Word of Truth: A Summary of Christian Doctrine Based on Biblical Revelation. Grand Rapids: Wm. B. Eerdmans Publishing.
- Morrison, Joseph Grant (1940). A Dialogue on Eternal Security (PDF). Kansas city: Nazarene Publishing House.
- Mozley, James Bowling (1855). A Treatise on the Augustinian Doctrine of Predestination. London: J. Murray.
- Newman, Albert Henry (1904). Manual of Church History. Philadelphia: American Baptist Publication Society.
- Olson, Roger E. (2004). The Westminster handbook to evangelical theology. Louisville, KY: Westminster John Knox Press.
- Olson, Roger E. (2009). Arminian Theology: Myths and Realities. Downers Grove, Illinois: InterVarsity Press.
- Olson, Roger E. (2013). "What's Wrong with Calvinism?". Roger E. Olson: My evangelical, Arminian theological musings. Patheos.
- O'Donnell, James (2005). Augustine: A New Biography. New York, NY: HarperCollins.
- Oort, Johannes van (2006). "Augustine and Manichaeism: New Discoveries, New Perspectives". Verbum et Ecclesia. 27 (2): 710–728. doi:10.4102/VE.V27I2.172. hdl:2263/2551. S2CID 170573550.
- Origen; Scheck, Thomas P. (2009). Commentary on the Epistle to the Romans, Books 1-5. Washington, DC: CUA Press. ISBN 978-0-8132-1736-9.
- Oropeza, B. J. (2000). Paul and Apostasy: Eschatology, Perseverance, and Falling Away in the Corinthian Congregation (2 ed.). Tübingen, Germany: J. C. B. Mohr (Paul Siebeck).
- Paton, C. Michael (2013b). "Doubting Calvinists". Credo House.
- Paton, Jeff (2013). "A historical examination of the doctrine of eternal security". Eternal Security.
- Patterson, James A. (2012). James Robinson Graves: Staking the Boundaries of Baptist Identity. Nashville: B&H Publishing Group.
- Peters, Ted (2015). God--The World's Future: Systematic Theology for a New Era, Third Edition. Minneapolis, MN: Augsburg Fortress Publishers. ISBN 978-1506400419.
- Picirilli, Robert E. (2002). Grace, Faith, Free Will: Contrasting Views of Salvation: Calvinism and Arminianism. Nashville: Randall House Publications.
- Pink, Arthur W. (2001). Eternal Security. Lafayette, IN: Sovereign Grace Publishers, Inc. ISBN 1589601955.
- Pink, Arthur W. (2009). Studies on Saving Faith. Zeeland, MI: Reformed church Publications.
- Pokki, Timo (1999). America's Preacher and His Message: Billy Graham's View of Conversion and Sanctification. Lanham: University Press of America.
- Purkiser, W. T. (1972). Conflicting Concepts of Holiness (PDF). Kansas City, MO: Beacon Hill Press of Kansas City.
- Purkiser, W. T. (1974). Security The False and the True (PDF). Kansas City, MO: Beacon Hill Press of Kansas City.
- Routledge, Geoerge, ed. (1851). Canons and Decrees of the Council of Trent. Translated by Buckley, Theodore Alois. London: George Routledge And Co.
- Schaff, Philip (1997). History of the Christian Church. Vol. 3. Oak Harbor, WA: Logos Research Systems.
- Schaff, Philip (1997b). History of the Christian Church. Vol. 6. Oak Harbor, WA: Logos Research Systems.
- Stacey, John (2024). "John Wycliffe". Encyclopædia Britannica.
- Shank, Robert (1989). Life in the Son. Minneapolis, MN: Bethany House Publishers. ISBN 1556610912.
- Sherling, Keith (2015). Evangelical Bible Doctrine: Articles in Honor of Dr. Mal Couch. Liberty Drive: AuthorHouse.
- South, Thomas Jacob (1993). The response of Andrew Fuller to the Sandemanian view of saving faith (Thd Thesis). Mid-America Baptist Theological Seminary.
- Sproul, R. C. (2011). Essential Truths of the Christian Faith. Carol Stream, IL: Tindale House Publishers, Inc.
- Stanglin, Keith D. (2007). Arminius on the Assurance of Salvation. Boston, Massachusetts: Brill.
- Stanley, Charles (1990). Eternal Security: Can You Be Sure?. Nashville: Oliver Nelson. ISBN 978-0840790958.
- Street, Nathan L. (2019). On the Frontlines: Exposing Satan's Tactics to Destroy a Generation. Eugene, OR: Wipf and Stock Publishers.
- Strong, James; McClintock, John (1880). "Augustine". The Cyclopedia of Biblical, Theological, and Ecclesiastical Literature. New York: Haper and Brothers.
- Sutton, Jerry (2012). "Anabaptism and James Arminius: A Study in Soteriological Kinship and Its Implications" (PDF). Midwestern Journal of Theology. 11 (2): 121–139.
- USBC (1941). Census of Religious Bodies, 1936. Washington: U.S. Government Printing Office.
- Toon, Peter (2011). The Emergence of Hyper-Calvinism in English Nonconformity 1689-1765. Eugene, OR: Wipf and Stock Publishers.
- Walls, Jerry L.; Dongell, Joseph (2004). Why I am not a Calvinist. Downers Grove, IL: InterVarsity Press.
- Westminster Assembly (1946) [1646]. S. W., Carruthers (ed.). The Confession of Faith of the Assembly of Divines at Westminster. London: Presbyterian Church of England.
- Wiley, H. Orton (1940). Christian theology. Vol. 1. Kansas City, MO: Beacon Hill Press.
- Wilkin, Robert N. (2022). "What Denominations Hold to Free Grace?". Grace Evangelical Society.
- Wilkin, Robert N. (2024). "Repentance Versus the Heresies of Curtis Hutson & Jack Hyles". Grace Evangelical Society.
- Wilson, Kenneth (2017). "A theological and Historical Investigation". In Chay, Fred (ed.). A Defense of Free Grace Theology: With Respect to Saving Faith, Perseverance, and Assurance. The Woodlands, TX: Grace Theology Press. ISBN 978-0-9981385-4-1.
- Wilson, Kenneth (2018). Augustine's Conversion from Traditional Free Choice to "Non-free Free Will: A Comprehensive Methodology. Tübingen: Mohr Siebeck.
- Witzki, Steve (2010a). "The Orthodox Church Affirms Conditional Security" (PDF). Society of Evangelical Arminians.
- Wynkoop, Mildred Bangs (1967). Foundations of Wesleyan-Arminian Theology. Kansas City, Missouri: Beacon Hill Press.
- Yates, Kenneth (2024-04-16). "A Victorian Dissenter: Robert Govett and the Doctrine of Millennial Reward". Grace Evangelical Society.
