= Perseverance of the saints =

Calvinist doctrine

Perseverance of the saints, sometimes called preservation of the saints, is a Calvinist doctrine that asserts that the elect will persevere in faith and ultimately attain salvation. This concept was first developed by Augustine of Hippo in the early 5th century, based on the idea of predestination by predeterminism. In the 16th century, John Calvin and other reformers incorporated this idea into their theological framework. The doctrine of the perseverance of the saints is rooted in this specific understanding of predestination and remains a central tenet of Reformed theology today.

== Definition and terminology ==
=== Definition ===
The doctrine of perseverance of the saints asserts that the elect will persevere in faith until the end of their lives and ultimately achieve salvation. Those who are truly born again are the elect who will persevere to the end.

=== Terminology ===
The alternative term "preservation of the saints" emphasizes God's role in determining the elect's perseverance. Conversely, "perseverance of the saints" highlights the human act of perseverance, which is a consequence of God's preservation. However, "preservation of the saints" is a broader concept that can describe how God preserves the elect, whether deterministically or not. The non-deterministic view, known as "conditional preservation," refers to God protecting the believer’s relationship with Him from external forces, contingent upon the believer’s continued faith.

Because one practical interpretation of the Calvinist doctrine of "perseverance of the saints" leads to "eternal security", over time, the term became synonymous with the doctrine itself. By the early 20th century, "eternal security" was used as a strict synonym for "perseverance of the saints". However, given the theological significance of the term "eternal security" in common usage, it's important to distinguish them. Indeed, some Calvinist theologians reject the use of "eternal security" for their doctrine of perseverance, as do proponents of non-Calvinist forms of eternal security.

== History ==
=== Augustine's doctrine of perseverance ===
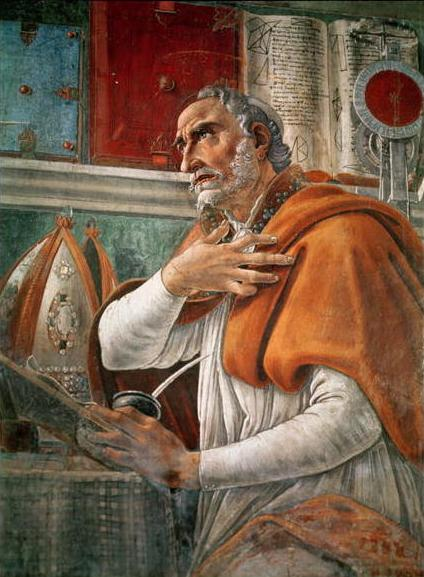
Botticelli, Sandro. (c. 1480) Saint Augustine in His Study

Before his conversion to Christianity in 387, Augustine of Hippo (354–430), adhered to three deterministic philosophies: Stoicism, Neoplatonism and Manichaeism. After his conversion, he taught traditional Christian theology against forms of theological determinism until 412.

During his conflict with the Pelagians, however Augustine seemed to reintroduce certain Manichean principles into his thought, a shift notably influenced by the controversy over infant baptism. His early exposure to Stoicism, with its emphasis on meticulous divine predeterminism, also shaped his views. According to Manichean doctrine, unborn and unbaptized infants were condemned to hell due to their physical bodies. Augustine asserted that God predetermined parents to seek baptism for their newborns, linking water baptism to regeneration, and ultimately predetermining which infants are damned and which are justified.

Augustine had to explain why some baptized individuals continued in the faith while others fell away and lived immoral lives. He taught that among those regenerated through baptism, some receive an additional gift of perseverance (donum perseverantiae) enabling them to maintain their faith and preventing them from falling away. Without this second gift, a baptized Christian with the Holy Spirit would not persevere and ultimately would not be saved. Augustine developed this doctrine of perseverance in De correptione et gratia (c. 426–427). While this doctrine theoretically gives security to the elect who receive the gift of perseverance, individuals cannot ascertain whether they have received it.

=== Proponents of Augustinian soteriology before the Reformation ===
Between the 5th century and the Reformation in the 16th century, theologians who upheld Augustinian soteriology, included: Gottschalk (c. 808–868), Ratramnus (died 868), Thomas Bradwardine (1300–1349), Gregory of Rimini (1300–1358), John Wycliffe (1320s – 1384), Johann Ruchrat von Wesel (died 1481), Girolamo Savonarola (1452–1498) and Johannes von Staupitz (1460–1524).

=== Development of the Calvinist doctrine of perseverance ===
John Calvin (1509–1564) among other Reformers, was deeply influenced by Augustinian soteriology. The soteriology of Calvin was further shaped and systematized by Theodore Beza and other theologians. It was then articulated during the Second Synod of Dort (1618–1619) in response to the opposing Five Articles of Remonstrance. The Calvinist doctrine of perseverance is present in Reformed confessions of faith such as the Lambeth Articles (1595), the Canons of Dort (1618–1619) and the Westminster Confession of Faith (1646).

== Doctrine ==
=== A consequence of the Calvinist doctrine of predestination ===
Orthodox forms of Calvinism view God's providence as expressed through theological determinism. This means that every event in the world is determined by God. As the Westminster Confession of Faith put it: "God, from all eternity, did, by the most wise and holy counsel of His own will, freely, and unchangeably ordain whatever comes to pass."

Concerning salvation, Calvin expressly taught that it is God's sovereign decision to determine whether an individual is saved or damned. He writes "By predestination we mean the eternal decree of God, by which he determined with himself whatever he wished to happen with regard to every man. All are not created on equal terms, but some are preordained to eternal life, others to eternal damnation; and, accordingly, as each has been created for one or other of these ends, we say that he has been predestinated to life or to death." Indeed, human actions leading to this end are also predetermined by God. In accordance, Calvin held to the doctrine of perseverance of the saints, contending for the unconditional preservation of the elect.

=== Practical interpretations of the doctrine of perseverance of the saints ===
==== Practical interpretation rejecting an absolute assurance of salvation ====
According to Calvinism, apostasy is not possible for those who are true Christians. However, being a true Christian is only demonstrated by perseverance to the end. This arises because there are instances where individuals appear to come to God but later display definitive apostasy. To address this phenomenon, Calvinist theologians have postulated that common grace might include effects that cannot be distinguished from effectual calling and subsequent irresistible grace. About that issue, Calvin formulated the concept of a temporary grace (sometimes called "evanescent grace") that appears and works for only a while in the reprobate but then to disappears. According to this concept, the Holy Spirit can create in some people effects which are indistinguishable from those of the irresistible grace of God, producing also a visible "fruit" in their life. Temporary grace was also supported by later Calvinist theologians such as Theodore Beza, William Perkins, John Owen, A. W. Pink and Loraine Boettner. This suggests that the knowledge of being a true Christian is theoretically not accessible during life. Thus a first interpretation of the doctrine of perseverance of the saints acknowledges explanations of apparent apostasy like "evanescent grace," which avoids offering to the believer absolute assurance of salvation during life. Several Reformed theologians have expressed a non-absolute assurance of salvation view.

==== Practical interpretation supporting an absolute assurance of salvation ====
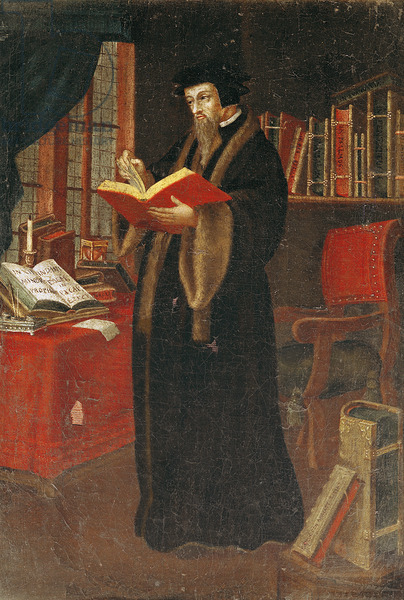
Anonymous (17th century) Portrait of John Calvin

Calvin heavily drew upon Augustinian soteriology. However, both Augustine and Luther, an Augustinian friar, held that believers, based on their own understanding, cannot definitively know if they are among the "elect to perseverance." Despite Calvin's inability to offer a clear rationale, he was more optimistic than Luther regarding this possibility. Calvin suggested that some assurance of being an elect might be possible. This possibility of assurance, based on personal introspection, was also expressed by later Calvinist theologians. It was mentioned in the Heidelberg Catechism (1563) and the Westminster Confession of Faith (1646). In the 18th century, Hyper-Calvinism encouraged introspection as a means for adherents to determine their election. The concept persisted into the 19th century. This assurance forms the foundation of unconditional eternal security within Calvinist circles.

The process leading to eternal security unfolds as follows: Initially, the believer must embrace the Calvinist system, emphasizing unconditional election and irresistible grace. Subsequently, through self-examination, they must discern the spiritual influence of the Holy Spirit. This introspection may lead to a faith in their own predetermined election. In this context, the concept of the perseverance of the saints may prompt the believer to believe in their irresistible perseverance.

Because this practical interpretation of the doctrine of "perseverance of the saints" leads to "eternal security", within Reformed Christianity, the term has become synonymous with the doctrine itself over time. By the early 20th century, "eternal security" was used as a strict synonym for "perseverance of the saints". However, in broader Protestantism, "eternal security" often carries a distinct meaning. It's then important to differentiate the two due to their respective theological significance.

Groups such as the Primitive Baptists, originating in Georgia in the early 20th century, officially embraced this form of eternal security due to their strong Calvinist beliefs.

==== Historical acknowledgment of the interpretations ====
In Calvinist circles two practical interpretations emerge regarding "perseverance of the saints": One interpretation accepts explanations of apparent apostasy such as "evanescent grace," which does not offer believers absolute assurance of salvation during life. The other interpretation rejects these explanations, asserting that believers, through introspection, can know with absolute certainty that they are elect, thus allowing belief in eternal security. These two perspectives were already observed in the 16th century. Jacobus Arminius (1560-1609), a pastor of the Reformed Church, encountered both perspectives stemming from the doctrine of perseverance of the saints. He labeled the first perspective "despair" (Latin: desperatio) and the second "security" (Latin: securitas). This "eternal security" interpretation of perseverance of the saints was also explicitly condemned by the Council of Trent (1545-1563).

== Objections ==
=== Perseverance of the saints hinders assurance of salvation ===
The doctrine of perseverance of the saints can suggest that a believer have some assurance of final salvation. However, this interpretation faces criticism for its perceived inconsistency. In orthodox Calvinism, while the elect will persevere to the end, believers cannot know they are elect until they persevere to the end. This reality, regardless of explanations for definitive apostasy, undermines the practical utility of "perseverance of the saints," hindering assurance of salvation. This critique has been advanced by various non-Calvinist sources, including proponents of free grace theology, and advocates of conditional preservation of the saints, such as Arminians.

=== Inconsistencies in explaining definitive apostasy ===
Within the perseverance of the saints framework, the phenomenon of definitive apostasy is generally explained by Calvinist theologians by the "evanescent grace" concept. This concept implies that the Holy Spirit voluntarily gives temporary faith and related "fruits". Non-Calvinist Christians find this explanation contrary to the revealed character of God and inconsistent with the overall revelation.

=== The eternal security interpretation introduces a tension in the subject of faith ===
The "eternal security" practical interpretation of perseverance of the saints asserts that an individual can believe he is an elect and will thus irresistibly persevere. Arminians often highlight a tension in this view between present faith in Jesus and faith in a past event, namely, election. They argue that such faith in a past event is given equal significance in ensuring final salvation as present faith in Jesus. Arminians contend that genuine faith should be unique and focused solely on Jesus.

=== The eternal security interpretation can lead to antinominianism ===
The "eternal security" practical interpretation of perseverance of the saints asserts that an individual can believe he is an elect and will thus irresistibly persevere. Such an interpretation can lead an individual to abandon a dynamic understanding of sanctification in favor of a static, antinomian perspective.

== Debated exegetical aspects ==
=== Warning passages of the book of Hebrews ===
Several warning passages in the book of Hebrews, especially Hebrews 6:4–6 and Heb 10:26–39 seem to contradict the Calvinistic doctrine of the unconditional preservation of the elect. The debate over these passages centers around the identity of the persons in question, with the following main interpretations proposed:

- The hypothetical view: The warnings are genuine but hypothetical, intended to jar believers into moral rectitude and perseverance.
- The phenomenological-false believer view: The warnings are real and directed toward people who can genuinely commit the sin, but those who can do so are not true believers.
- The phenomenological-true believer view: The warnings are given to true believers who can genuinely commit the sin.
- The covenant community view: The warnings concern the rejection of a covenant community by God when the community as a whole turns away from God's will, rather than individual believers.

There are several less common interpretations. One suggests that the warnings do not refer to a loss of salvation but rather a loss of eternal rewards. Another posits that the warnings could refer to Jewish Christians reverting to Judaism.

=== Hebrew 6:4-6 interpretations supporting Calvinist unconditional preservation ===
"Hypothetical view": Hebrews 6:4-6 can describe those who temporarily backslide in their faith but does not address the issue of permanent loss of faith. This reading has been criticized for its tendency to weaken the force of the passage.

"Phenomenological-false believer view": Hebrews 6:4-6 does not refer to regenerated individuals, but to unbelievers who have received God's gifts and benefited from His grace yet remained skeptics. This distinction attracts recurring criticism due to its artificial nature.

=== Hebrew 6:4-6 interpretation contradicting Calvinist unconditional preservation ===
"Phenomenological-true believer view": Oropeza asserts that the recipients of the letter to the Hebrews had faced persecutions, and the author acknowledges that some members had become apostates despite their genuine conversion experiences. The author warns the current audience that despite their past benefits and experiences confirming their faith, they too could fall away if they continue in their state of malaise and neglect, with dire consequences for apostasy. While some argue for an irremediable apostasy interpretation, others, contend that apostasy by a regenerated Christian is possible but not systematically irremediable as long as they are alive. According to this view, McKnight suggests that the author of Hebrews describes an apostasy that exceeds the grace period given by God, which is irremediable, not the remediable apostasy that can occur during a person's life.

== Other Protestant views ==
=== Anabaptist view ===
Anabaptist theology traditionally teaches conditional preservation of the saints.

=== Lutheran view ===
Lutherans believe that a true Christian can lose his or her salvation.

=== Arminian view ===
Arminians teaches conditional preservation of the saints.

=== Free grace view ===
Free grace advocates believe that believers are promised eternal security, but not guaranteed perseverance. Those who do not persevere will face temporal discipline and loss of rewards.

== See also ==
- Assurance of salvation
- Eternal security
- Apostasy in Christianity
- Backsliding
- Eternal sin
- Conditional preservation of the saints
