= Texas Trust CU Theatre =

Concert hall in Grand Prairie, Texas

Coordinates: 32.7667°N 96.9822°W

- The Theatre of the Future
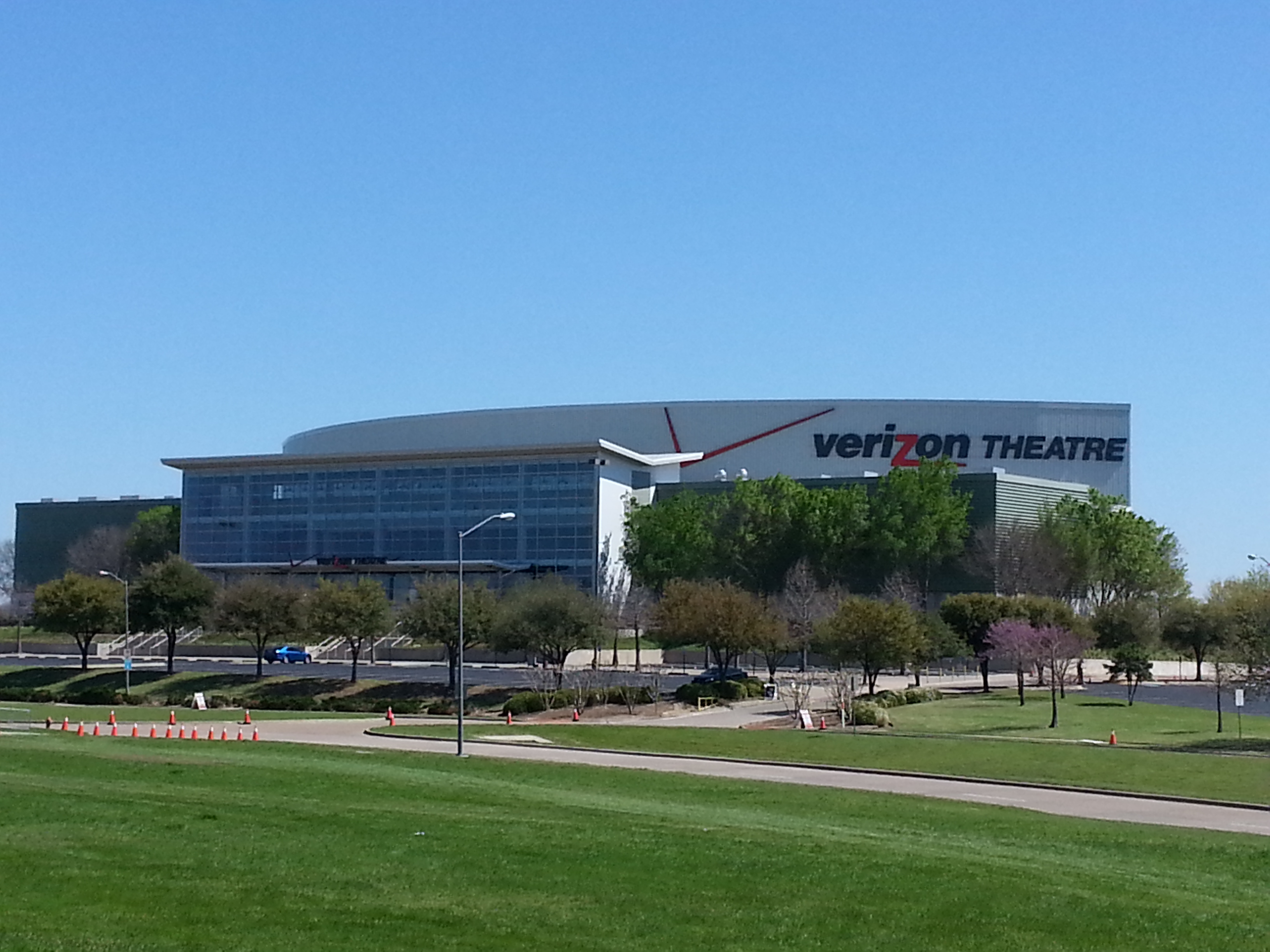
- Exterior view of venue in 2016
- Former names: Texas ShowPlace (planning/construction); NextStage Performance Theater (2002–04); Nokia Live (2004–10); Verizon Theatre (2010–18); The Theatre at Grand Prairie (2018-21)
- Address: 1001 Performance Pl; Grand Prairie, TX 75050-7965
- Location: Dallas–Fort Worth metroplex
- Owner: City of Grand Prairie
- Operator: AEG Live
- Capacity: 6,350

Construction
- Built: 1999–2002
- Opened: February 2002
- Cost: $63 million ($122 million in 2025 dollars)

Website
- Venue Website

Texas Trust CU Theatre is an American concert hall located in Grand Prairie, Texas, 16 miles (26 km) west of Dallas and 24 miles (39 km) east of Fort Worth. It is near Lone Star Park and Grand Prairie Stadium. The theatre is currently operated by AEG and owned by the City of Grand Prairie.

== History ==
The theatre was proposed in 1998 as an alternative to the now demolished Reunion Arena in Dallas. Owned by NextStage Entertainment Corporation, the theatre was built in Grand Prairie to boost the economy of the city and lead to possible tourism. Construction began in the summer of 1999; however, it was delayed 14 months due to an increase in budget. The final construction cost was about $63 million. Originally known as "Texas ShowPlace", the venue was meant to house concerts and theatrical performances for the Dallas–Fort Worth area. The theatre opened in February 2002 as the "NextStage Performance Theater" with a capacity of 6,350.

In May 2002, the theatre hired Dallas artist Cabe Booth to paint oil portraits of the visiting acts and personalities. The portraits are signed by the performers and then hung on display in the backstage area and administrative office area. In 2007, the venue moved a small portion of the now over 300 (and growing) 4'×4' paintings into the main foyer along the downstairs entry to the private suites. In 2004, Nokia Corporation purchased the naming rights to the theatre for six years, changing its title to "Nokia Live". In February 2010, Verizon Wireless acquired naming rights for ten years, changing the title to the "Verizon Theatre". On July 27, 2018, the venue dropped the Verizon from its name and changed its moniker to The Theatre at Grand Prairie. On April 27, 2021, Texas Trust Credit Union signed a naming rights agreement, changing the title to Texas Trust CU Theatre at Grand Prairie.

== Noted performances ==
Since the venue has opened, it has hosted several Broadway productions and family shows including Sesame Street Live, Yo Gabba Gabba! Live! and The Doodlebops Live!. Concert performers have included The Scorpions, Fifth Harmony, Ratt, Demi Lovato, Janet Jackson, Phish, "Weird Al" Yankovic, Toni Braxton, Jennifer Hudson, The Killers, Paramore, Nicki Minaj, Mannheim Steamroller, Justin Bieber, Michael Bublé, Alicia Keys, Kylie Minogue, Alanis Morissette, Roger Daltrey, Bob Dylan, The Black Crowes, Van Morrison, Duran Duran, Coldplay, Robert Plant, Stevie Nicks, David Gray, Guster, Death Cab for Cutie, The Postal Service, Ben Folds Five, Barenaked Ladies, Jimmy Eat World, Arctic Monkeys, The Smashing Pumpkins, ZZ Top, Marilyn Manson, Gorillaz, Kelly Clarkson, TobyMac, Reba McEntire, Peter Frampton, South Korean boy groups BTS, VIXX, 2PM, B.A.P, B1A4, GOT7, DAY6, Boyfriend, EXO, SHINee, Monsta X, Seventeen, Wanna One, NCT 127, NCT Dream, Astro, Stray Kids, Tomorrow X Together, The Boyz, and Ateez, South Korean girl groups Red Velvet, Le Sserafim and (G)I-DLE, and Christian worship services have also taken place here by groups such as Hillsong United and Joseph Prince Ministries. The music parties surrounding Super Bowl XLV (as part of the Pepsi Super Bowl Fan Jam) were held there as well on Thursday, Friday, and Saturday night before the actual game on Sunday. Kid Rock, Duran Duran, and Jason Derulo performed in the VH1 Pepsi Super Bowl Fan Jam (again with parts live). Latin artists Jenni Rivera, Chino Y Nacho, and Dulce Maria performed at the NFL Pepsi Musica Super Bowl Fan Jam. Finally, there was a CMT Crossroads - Live featuring the Pretenders and Faith Hill. Most recently, as part of 2024 Major League Baseball All-Star Game festivities, Jimmy Fallon brought The Tonight Show for a week of shows.
