= Southern Baptist traditionalism =

Theological view within Southern Baptists

Southern Baptist traditionalism, also called Traditional Southern Baptist soteriology, Traditionalism or Provisionism are terms used to refer to the view of salvation commonly held within the Southern Baptist Convention. This view aligns neither with Classical Arminianism or Calvinism as it is distinguished from Arminianism by denying the Arminian doctrine of prevenient grace and the plausibility of losing one's salvation by teaching eternal security, while it differs from Calvinism by affirming libertarian free will and due to a denial of unconditional election. The view thus teaches that every man is able to respond positively to God's provision for mankind without a necessary internal change of man's nature happening prior to conversion, viewing the work of the Spirit through the preaching of the gospel as sufficient to enable a person to respond to positively to God.

The terminology of it being "Traditional" Southern Baptist soteriology has been criticized due to there already being Calvinist influences within the Southern Baptist Convention early on within its development. However, advocates of the view such as David L. Allen have argued that even though there has always been a Calvinist presence within the SBC, the majority have historically rejected it.
