= Gift of perseverance =

Ancient Christian doctrine

The Gift of perseverance is a doctrine developed by Augustine of Hippo, according to which perseverance in the Christian faith is a distinct gift granted by God. Although this gift ensures final salvation for those who receive it, Augustine maintains that individuals cannot know whether they have been granted it. Consequently, even baptized and regenerated Christians may ultimately be lost if they lack this gift.

== Philosophical influences and origins ==
Before his conversion to Christianity in 387, Augustine of Hippo (354–430), adhered to three deterministic philosophies: Stoicism, Neoplatonism and Manichaeism. After his conversion, he taught traditional Christian theology against forms of theological determinism until 412.

During his conflict with the Pelagians, however Augustine seemed to reintroduce certain Manichean principles into his thought, a shift notably influenced by the controversy over infant baptism. His early exposure to Stoicism, with its emphasis on meticulous divine predeterminism, also shaped his views. According to Manichean doctrine, unborn and unbaptized infants were condemned to hell due to their physical bodies. Augustine asserted that God predetermined parents to seek baptism for their newborns, linking water baptism to regeneration, and ultimately predetermining which infants are damned and which are justified.

Augustine had to explain why some baptized individuals continued in the faith while others fell away and lived immoral lives. He formulates the problem by linking perseverance to predestination:

"Therefore, of two infants, equally bound by original sin, why the one is taken and the other left; and of two wicked men of already mature years, why this one should be so called as to follow Him that calleth, while that one is either not called at all, or is not called in such a manner – the judgments of God are unsearchable. But of two pious men, why to the one should be given perseverance unto the end, and to the other it should not be given, God’s judgments are even more unsearchable. Yet to believers it ought to be a most certain fact that the former is of the predestinated, the latter is not."

== Theological formulation ==
Augustine taught that among those regenerated through baptism, some receive an additional gift of perseverance (donum perseverantiae) enabling them to maintain their faith and preventing them from falling away. Augustine developed this doctrine of perseverance in De correptione et gratia (c. 426–427). There, he wrote:

"To the saints predestinated to the kingdom of God by God’s grace, the aid of perseverance that is given is not such as the former, but such that to them perseverance itself is bestowed; not only so that without that gift they cannot persevere, but, moreover, so that by means of this gift they cannot help persevering. For not only did He say, “Without me ye can do nothing,” but He also said, “Ye have not chosen me, but I have chosen you, and ordained you that ye should go and bring forth fruit, and that your fruit should remain.” By which words He showed that He had given them not only righteousness, but perseverance therein."

Without this second gift, a baptized Christian with the Holy Spirit would not persevere and ultimately would not be saved. While this doctrine theoretically gives security to the elect who receive the gift of perseverance, individuals cannot ascertain whether they have received it. Moreover, Augustine believed that this gift can be sought and received through prayer.

== Historical reception and influences ==
Augustine himself believed that Cyprian held a similar view of perseverance being a work of God, thereby foreshadowing the Augustinian view. Hilary of Galeata (476–558) expressed concern that many Christians resisted Augustine's radical view of perseverance. Hilary complained, "[T]hey do not want this perseverance to be preached if it means that it can neither be merited by prayer nor lost by rebellion".

The Augustinian view also influenced the development of the Calvinist doctrine of perseverance of the saints. In response to later developments toward an “eternal security” interpretation within Calvinist theology, the Council of Trent (1545–1563) explicitly condemned the idea that anyone could claim to have received the “gift of perseverance”.

== See also ==
- Augustinian soteriology
- Eternal security
- Perseverance of the saints
