= B. J. Oropeza =

American theologian

- Born: 1961
- Occupations: Theologian, biblical scholar, religious studies scholar, university teacher
- Website: www.patheos.com/blogs/inchrist/

Brisio Javier Oropeza (born 1961) is an American biblical scholar and theologian who is best known for his studies in Pauline literature, intertextuality, apostasy and perseverance. He is professor of Biblical and Religious Studies at Azusa Pacific University and Seminary in Azusa, California.

== Education and personal life ==
Oropeza was born in 1961. He earned his bachelor's degree in biblical studies from Northern California Bible College, Pleasanton, California (1989). He earned a master's degree in apologetics at Simon Greenleaf School of Law (now Trinity Law School) (1991), and a second master's degree in theology from Fuller Theological Seminary in Pasadena, California (1993). He earned his Ph.D. in New Testament Theology at Durham University (England) in 1998 under the supervision of Drs. James D. G. Dunn and Loren T. Stuckenbruck.

== Career ==
From 1990 to 1995, Oropeza worked for the Christian Research Institute (then in Irvine, California), an apologetics organization oriented toward researching and countering cults and new religious movements, as a Research Associate and assistant for the Christian Research Journal. After completing his Ph.D., Oropeza taught at George Fox University (Newberg, Oregon) as Visiting assistant professor of Religious Studies (1998-2001).

He is professor of Biblical studies position at Azusa Pacific University starting in 2003. He has been a scholar in residence at the University of Tübingen (Germany) (2009), and visiting scholar in residence at the Princeton Theological Seminary (2017). He does supervising for students working on their Ph.D., currently through St. Andrews University, Scotland/Trinity College (Bristol, England).

Oropeza started the Intertextuality in the New Testament section of the Society of Biblical Literature (SBL) (2008-2013), co-chaired the Scripture and Paul seminar (2020-2022). He was on the editorial board of the Rhetoric of Religious Antiquity series (SBL Press) (2015-present).

In 2018, he was elected to membership of the Studiorum Novi Testamenti Societas (SNTS). He has contributed to Bible translations for the New Revised Standard Edition (NRSVue), the Common English Bible (CEB), and the Lexham English Septuagint (LES). He is an internationally published author, including contributions in The Oxford Encyclopedia of Biblical Interpretation (2013) and The Oxford Encyclopedia of the Bible and Theology (2015). He is also a columnist for the blog In Christ at Patheos.com.

== Theology ==
Oropeza is affiliated with the Free Methodist Church. He is Wesleyan-Armininan in his theology. He made notable contributions concerning the possibility of apostasy of the believers in New Testament writings. He believes in conditional preservation and the possible restoration of the apostate. He is a proponent of the corporate election view. He is known for his studies in Pauline literature and intertextuality. He contributed also on superheroes theology.

== Publications ==
=== Books ===
- Oropeza, B. J. (1994). Ninety-Nine Reasons Why No One Knows When Christ Will Return (2 ed.). Downers Grove, Illinois: InterVarsity Press.
- Oropeza, B. J. (1995). A Time to Laugh: The Holy Laughter Phenomenon Examined. Peabody, Massachusetts: Hendrickson.
- Oropeza, B. J. (1997). Ninety-Nine Answers to Questions about Angels, Demons, and Spiritual Warfare (2 ed.). Eastbourne, United Kingdom/Downers Grove, Illinois: Kingsway Publications.
- Oropeza, B. J. (2000). Paul and Apostasy: Eschatology, Perseverance, and Falling Away in the Corinthian Congregation (2 ed.). Tübingen, Germany: J. C. B. Mohr (Paul Siebeck).
- Oropeza, B. J. (2005). The Gospel According to Superheroes: Religion and Popular Culture (3 ed.). New York: Peter Lang Publishers.
- Oropeza, B. J. (2009). Jesus and Paul: Global Perspectives in Honor of James D. G. Dunn. Library of New Testament Studies. Vol. 414. London: T. & T. Clark.
- Oropeza, B. J. (2011). In the Footsteps of Judas and Other Defectors: Apostasy in the New Testament Communities. Vol. 1. Eugene: Cascade/Wipf & Stock.
- Oropeza, B. J. (2012). Jews, Gentiles, and the Opponents of Paul: Apostasy in the New Testament Communities. Vol. 2. Eugene: Cascade/Wipf & Stock.
- Oropeza, B. J. (2012). Churches under Siege of Persecution and Assimilation: Apostasy in the New Testament Communities. Vol. 3. Eugene: Cascade/Wipf & Stock.
- Oropeza, B. J. (2016). Exploring Second Corinthians: Death and Life, Hardship and Rivalry. Socio-Rhetorical Exploration Commentary. Vol. 3. Atlanta: Society of Biblical Literature.
- Oropeza, B. J. (2016). Exploring Intertextuality: Diverse Strategies for the New Testament Interpretation of Texts. Eugene.: Cascade/Wipf & Stock.
- Oropeza, B. J. (2017). 1 Corinthians. Eugene.: Wipf & Stock/Cascade.
- Oropeza, B. J. (2019). Scripture, Texts, and Tracings in 1 Corinthians. Lanham, MD: Fortress Academic/Lexington Books.
- Oropeza, B. J. (2020). New Studies in Textual Interplay. SSEJC 20, Library of New Testament Studies 632. London: Bloomsbury.
- Oropeza, B. J. (2020). Perspectives on Paul: Five Views. Grand Rapids: Baker Academic.
- Oropeza, B. J. (2021). Practicing Intertextuality: Ancient Jewish and Greco-Roman Exegetical Techniques. Eugene: Cascade.
- Oropeza, B. J. (2022). Scripture, Texts, and Tracings in 2 Corinthians and Philippians. Lanham, MD: Fortress Academic/Lexington Books.

=== Articles and chapters ===
- Oropeza, B. J. (1999). "Apostasy in the Wilderness: Paul's Message to the Corinthians in a State of Eschatological Liminality". Journal for the Study of the New Testament. 75: 69–86.
- Oropeza, B. J. (2002). Robbins, Vernon; Watson, Duane (eds.). "Echoes of Isaiah in the Rhetoric of Paul: New Exodus, Wisdom, and the Humility of the Cross in Utopian-Apocalyptic Expectations". The Intertexture of Apocalyptic Discourse. Society of Biblical Literature Symposium Series. Scholars Press/Leiden: E. J. Brill: 87–113.
- Oropeza, B. J. (2006). Robertson, C. K. (ed.). Religion and Sexuality: Conflicts and Controversies. New York: Peter Lang. pp. 27–63.
- Oropeza, B. J. (2007). "Paul and Theodicy: Intertextual Thoughts on God's Justice and Faithfulness to Israel in Romans 9–11". New Testament Studies. 53: 57–80. doi:10.1017/S0028688507000045. S2CID 170616497.
- Oropeza, B. J. (2010). "Judas' Death and Final Destiny in the Gospels and Earliest Christian Writings". Neotestamentica. 44 (2): 342–62.
- Oropeza, B. J. (2011). "The Warning Passages in Hebrews: Revised Theologies and New Methods of Interpretation". Currents in Biblical Research. 10: 1–21. doi:10.1177/1476993X10391138. S2CID 170628561.
- Oropeza, B. J. (2015). Balentine, Samuel E. (ed.). The Oxford Encyclopedia of Bible and Theology. Vol. 1. New York/Oxford: Oxford University Press.
- Oropeza, B. J. (2018). "Apostasie in den Schriften des Neuen Testaments: Auf den Spuren des Judas und anderer Abtrünniger in den Evangelien, den johanneischen Schriften und der Apostelgeschichte". Zeitschrift für Neues Testament (in German). 41 (21): 61–77.
- Oropeza, B. J. (2019). Belleville, Linda L.; Oropeza, B. J. (eds.). Scripture, Texts, and Tracings in 1 Corinthians. Lanham: Fortress Academic/Lexington Books.
- Oropeza, B. J. (2019). Stuckenbruck, Loren T.; Gurtner, Daniel M. (eds.). "Apostasy". T&T Clark Companion to Second Temple Judaism. 2. London: 46–48.
- Oropeza, B. J. (2020). Furey, Constance M.; Matz, Brian; McKenzie, Steven L.; Römer, Thomas Chr.; Schroeter, Jens; Walfish, Barry Dov; Ziolkowski (eds.). Encyclopedia of the Bible and Its Reception. Vol. 18. Berlin: De Gruyter. pp. 251–72.
- Oropeza, B. J. (2020). McKnight, Scot; Oropeza, B. J. (eds.). Perspectives on Paul: Five Views. Grand Rapids: Baker Academic. pp. 1–23.
- Oropeza, B. J. (2021–22). "Justification by Faith in Christ or Faithfulness of Christ? Updating the πίστις Χριστοῦ Debate in Light of Paul's Use of Scripture". Journal of Theological Studies. 72 pt.1: 102–24.
- Oropeza, B. J. (2022). Das, A. Andrew; Oropeza, B. J. (eds.). Scripture, Texts, and Tracings in 2 Corinthians and Philippians. Lanham: Fortress Academic/Lexington. pp. 85–105.
- Oropeza, B. J. (2022). Das, A. Andrew; Oropeza, B. J. (eds.). "Reconciliation in 'Light' of Isaiah 8:22–9:6[7]: Confirming Isaianic Influence on Paul's Use of καταλλαγή in 2 Corinthians 5:17–21". Scripture, Texts, and Tracings in 2 Corinthians and Philippians. Lanham: 85–105.
- Oropeza, B. J. (2023). "Grace as the Ground of Obedience in Romans 6". Sacrum Testamentum. 3: 1–35.
