= Joseph Prince =

Singaporean evangelist and pastor

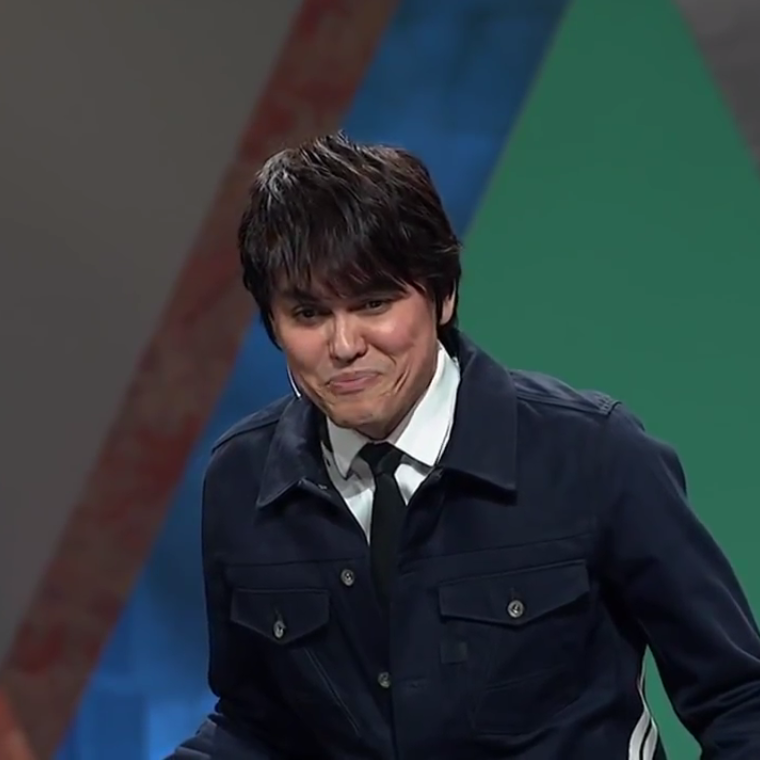
- Joseph Prince in 2015
- Title: Senior pastor

Personal life
- Born: Xenonamandar Jegahusiee Singh; 15 May 1963 (age 63) Singapore
- Spouse: Wendy Prince (m. 1995)
- Children: 2
- Website: www.josephprince.com www.josephprince.org

Religious life
- Religion: Christianity (Nondenominational)
- Church: New Creation Church

Joseph Prince (born Xenonamandar Jegahusiee Singh; 15 May 1963) is a Singaporean evangelist and the senior pastor of New Creation Church, which is based in Singapore. He was one of the church's founders in 1983.

== Early life and education ==
Prince was born in Singapore, the son of a Sikh of Indian origin and a Chinese mother. He converted to Christianity at age 12. Prince studied at Commonwealth Secondary School and completed his A levels at a private school, Our Lady of Lourdes. He adopted the name Joseph Prince while serving as an IT consultant, just before being appointed senior pastor in 1990.

== Teachings and ministry ==
Prince's preaching is particularly associated with the themes of grace, the believer's righteousness through faith in Jesus Christ, and the completed or "finished" work of Christ on the cross. He teaches that righteousness is received as a gift through faith rather than earned through moral effort, and that Christian living should proceed from an assurance of acceptance by God rather than from an attempt to obtain it.

Prince has described the "abundance of grace" and the "gift of righteousness", drawing on Romans 5:17, as central themes of his ministry. His teaching commonly contrasts receiving through faith with reliance on self-effort and presents Christ's death and resurrection as the basis of the believer's forgiveness, acceptance and identity in Christ.

Academic Daniel P. S. Goh has examined the centrality of grace to Prince's ministry and New Creation Church within the wider development of independent, non-denominational Pentecostal megachurches in Singapore.

Prince's interpretation of grace has also attracted theological debate. Some Christian commentators have commended his emphasis on salvation by grace and his criticism of attempts to merit acceptance from God through religious works, while questioning aspects of his interpretation of biblical law, repentance and confession.

== Compensation ==
On 5 October 2008, in an interview with the Sunday Times, Prince, also the executive chairman of the church council, acknowledged that he was "well-paid" with his salary going up $50,000 a month.

On 30 March 2009, The Straits Times reported that the church had paid one employee between $500,001 and $550,000 in its last financial year. Under the recommendations of the Code of Governance for charities then, all charities and non-profit organisations in Singapore were encouraged to disclose the salary bands of their top executives to the Commissioner of Charities. While not confirming the identity of the employee, the church responded that its policy is to "recognize and reward key contributors to the church and Senior Pastor Prince is the main pillar of our church's growth and revenue."

On 15 April 2009, Deacon Matthew Kang, the church chairman, responded that it was not a public charity and did not solicit public donations, asserting that "there is absolutely no compulsion to give whether in tithes or offerings, and any giving is done out of a willing heart", and that "every giver is appreciated and it is taken in good faith that he believes in the elected leadership and will trust them to make good decisions for the particular church he has chosen to attend, whether as a member or a visitor."

In October 2014, New Creation Church denied a report that alleged Prince's net worth as S$6.4 million, claiming that his actual net worth was "substantially lower" than the reported figure and that it regarded Prince's net worth as "personal in nature". On 28 October 2014, The Straits Times reported that according to a 2012 tax document filed, Prince had not received any compensation from Joseph Prince Ministries or any related organisations. The report further stated that the New Creation Church council had stated that Prince had not received any salary from the organisation since 2009.

== Personal life ==
Joseph Prince is married to Wendy Prince. They have a daughter and a son.
