= Conditional preservation of the saints =

Arminian religious doctrine

The conditional preservation of the saints, or conditional perseverance of the saints, or commonly conditional security, is the Arminian Christian belief that believers are kept safe by God in their saving relationship with him upon the condition of a persevering faith in Christ. This doctrine asserts that while believers are secure in their union with Christ and cannot be separated from him by external forces, they retain the freedom to turn away from God and commit apostasy.

Rooted in the teachings of the early church, Jacobus Arminius, and John Wesley, this view is supported by extensive biblical warnings against falling away. In contrast notably to the Calvinist doctrine of the perseverance of the saints, Arminians hold that saving faith must continually express itself in love and obedience. To prevent the forfeiture of salvation, the doctrine emphasizes ongoing spiritual maturity, mutual encouragement, and prayerful dependence on the Holy Spirit. It is widely affirmed across various Christian traditions.

== Theological overview ==
The conditional preservation of the saints is the Arminian Christian belief that believers are kept safe by God in their saving relationship with him upon the condition of a persevering faith in Christ. Arminians find the Scriptures describing both the initial act of faith in Christ and the persevering faith in him. For Arminians, the relationship of the believer to Christ is never a static relationship existing as the irrevocable consequence of a past decision, act, or experience. Rather, it is a living union proceeding upon a living faith in a living Savior. This living union is captured in the simple command by Christ to "remain in me" (John 15:4).

According to Arminians, biblical saving faith expresses itself in love and obedience to God. In the Remonstrant Confession of 1621, the first Remonstrants affirmed that true or living faith operates through love, and that God chooses to give salvation and eternal life through his Son, ultimately glorifying those who persevere in faith.

Arminians believe that it is abundantly evident from the Scriptures that the believer is secure. Furthermore, believers have assurance in knowing there is no external power or circumstance that can separate them from the love of God they enjoy in union with Christ. Nevertheless, Arminians see numerous warnings in Scripture directed to genuine believers about the possibility of falling away in unbelief and thereby becoming severed from their saving union with God through Christ. Arminians hold that if a believer becomes an unbeliever, committing apostasy, they necessarily cease to partake of the promises of salvation and eternal life made to believers who continue in faith and remain united to Christ.

Therefore, Arminians seek to follow the biblical writers in warning believers about the real dangers of committing apostasy. A sure and Biblical way to avoid apostasy is to admonish believers to mature spiritually in their relationship with God in union with Christ and through the power of the Spirit. Maturity takes place as Christ-followers keep on meeting with fellow believers for mutual encouragement and strength, exhorting each to love God and others, continuing to grow in the grace and knowledge of their Lord and Savior Jesus Christ, and persevering in faith in prayerful dependence upon God through various trials and temptations.

== Historical background ==
Scholars note that the tension between Calvinism and Arminianism traditionally culminates in the question of whether those who have been regenerated must necessarily persevere or may apostatize and be lost. Prior to the time of the debate between Calvinists and the Arminians at the Synod of Dort (1618-1619), the view in the early church appears to be on the side of conditional security, where continued faith and obedience are necessary for salvation.

=== Arminius and the Remonstrants ===
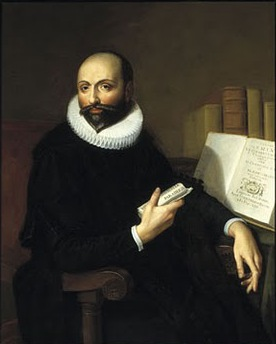
James Arminius, Krzysztof Lubieniecki, c. 1705.

Arminianism teaches that ongoing faith is necessary, and regenerate individuals can fall back into sin and perish. This perspective was developed by Jacobus Arminius (1560-1609). In his theological writings, Arminius observed that the early church fathers overwhelmingly supported the view that believers could fall away, noting that conditional security was never reckoned as a heretical opinion, but had always had more supporters in the church than the opposing view. He affirmed that believers possess sufficient strength to fight against Satan and gain victory, provided they stand prepared for battle and implore Christ's help. Consequently, he taught that God resolves to save those who persevere in faith, but leaves unbelieving and impenitent backsliders under condemnation.

After the death of Arminius, his followers wrote a Remonstrance (1610) closely based on his Declaration of Sentiments (1608), which expressed caution regarding the possibility of apostasy. In particular, its fifth article expressed the necessity of further study on the possibility of apostasy, while still maintaining that believers have full power to strive against sin and win the victory. Sometime between 1610 and the official proceeding of the Synod of Dort (1618), the Remonstrants became convinced that the Scriptures taught that a true believer was capable of falling away from faith and perishing eternally as an unbeliever. Simon Episcopius (1583-1643) formalized their views in "The Opinion of the Remonstrants" (1618), which was their official stand during the Synod of Dort. They later expressed this same view in the Remonstrant Confession (1621).

=== Other Arminians who affirmed conditional security ===
Numerous theologians spanning centuries have maintained the conditional security perspective. John Goodwin (1593-1665) was a Puritan who presented the Arminian position of falling away in his work Redemption Redeemed (1651), which drew considerable attention from Calvinists. In his book, English bishop Laurence Womock (1612-1685) provides numerous scriptural references supporting the fifth article concerning perseverance delivered by the later Remonstrants. Philipp van Limborch (1633-1712) penned the first complete Remonstrant systematic theology in 1702 that included a dedicated section on apostasy. In 1710, a minister in the Church of England, Daniel Whitby (1638-1726), published a major work criticizing the five points of Calvinism, which involved their doctrine of unconditional perseverance.

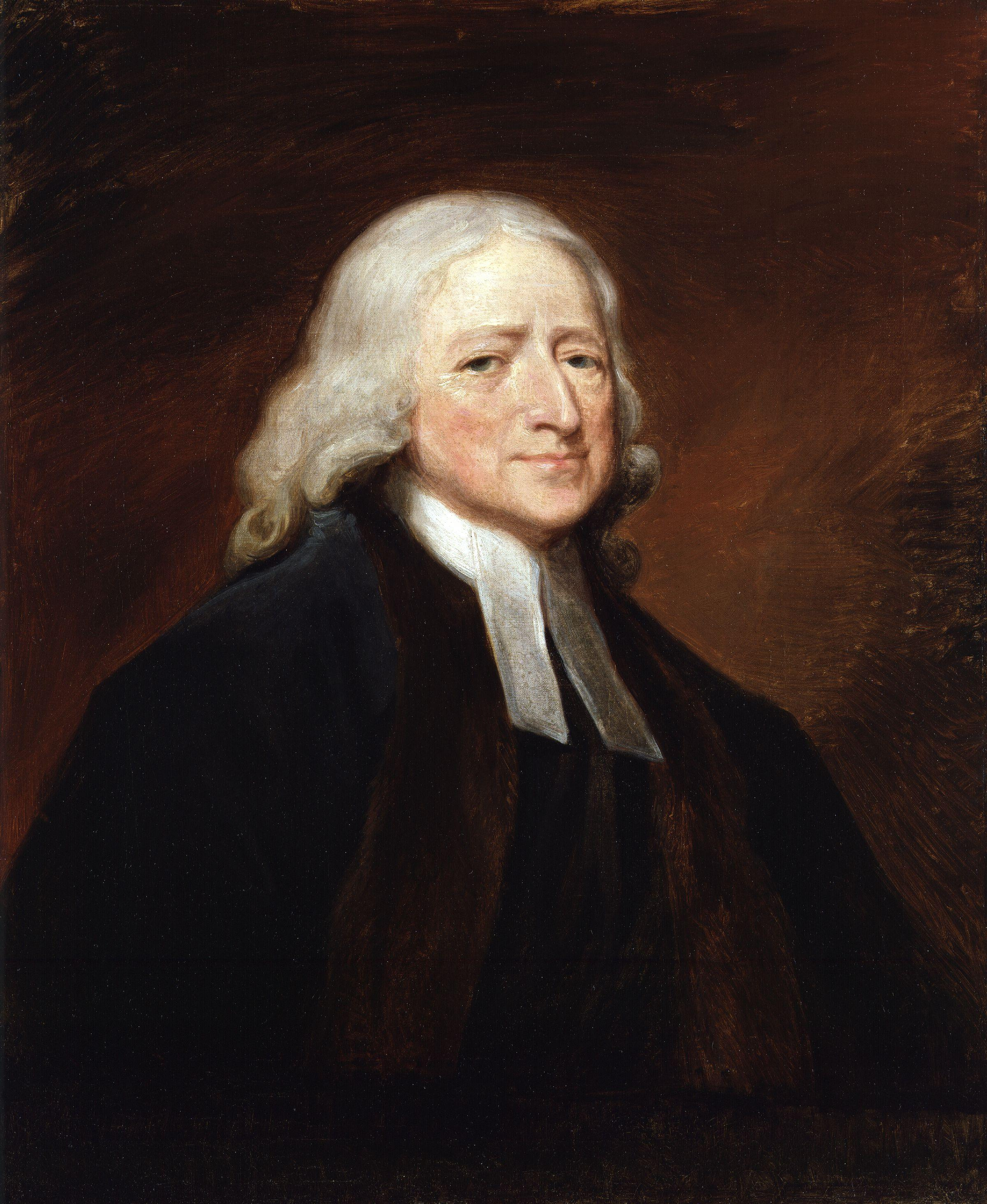
John Wesley, George Romney, 1789.

John Wesley (1703-1791), the founder of Methodism, was an outspoken defender of conditional security and critic of unconditional security. In 1751, Wesley defended his position in a work titled "Serious Thoughts Upon the Perseverance of the Saints." In it, he argued that a believer remains in a saving relationship with God if they continue in faith or endure in faith unto the end. Wesley affirmed that a child of God cannot go to hell while they continue as a true believer. However, if a believer makes a shipwreck of the faith, then a man that believes now may be an unbeliever some time hence and become a child of the devil. He then adds that God is the Father of them that believe so long as they believe, but the devil is the father of them that believe not, whether they did once believe or no. Like his Arminian predecessors, Wesley was convinced from the testimony of the Scriptures that a true believer may abandon faith and the way of righteousness, and fall from God as to perish everlastingly.

From John Wesley onward, it looks as if every Methodist and Wesleyan pastor, scholar, or theologian in print has opposed unconditional perseverance, including John William Fletcher (1729-1783), Adam Clarke (1762-1832), Nathan Bangs (1778-1862), Thomas C. Thornton (1794-1860), Samuel Wakefield (1799-1895), Luther Lee (1800-1889), Amos Binney (1802-1878), Thomas N. Ralston (1806-1891), Thomas O. Summers (1812-1882), John Miley (1813-1895), Philip Pugh (1817-1871), Randolph Sinks Foster (1820-1903), William Burt Pope (1822-1903), B. T. Roberts (1823-1893), Daniel Steele (1824-1914), Benjamin Field (1827-1869), John Shaw Banks (1835-1917), and Joseph Agar Beet (1840-1924).

== Apostasy: definition and dangers ==
=== Definition ===
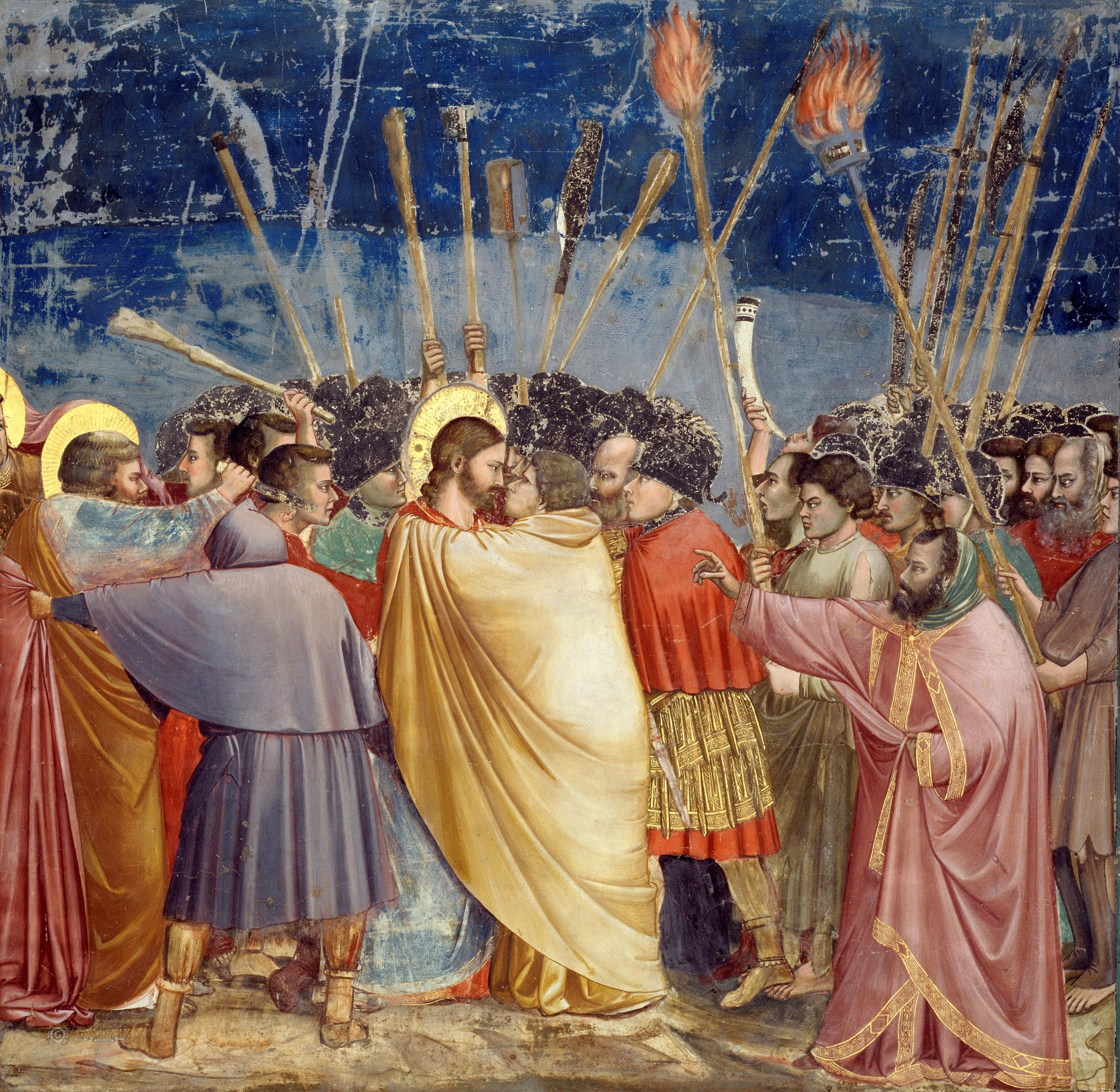
The Kiss of Judas, Giotto, 1304-1306.

Apostasy is defined as the deliberate disavowal of Christian faith made by a formerly believing Christian. The English word is derived from the Greek noun apostasia, which dictionaries define as a falling away or defection from true religion. It is related to the word apostasion, meaning divorce or a contract of renunciation, and the verb aphistēmi, which means to depart, desert, or withdraw. Apostasy represents a dissolution of the union with God subsisting through faith in Christ, and involves a willful falling away from Christian truth. Consequently, an apostate is someone who has severed their union with Christ by withdrawing from an actual saving relationship with Him.

Linguistically, the New Testament uses words conveying falling away, drifting, and stumbling to express the failure to persist in faith. Further theological significance is attached to the verb skandalizō (to fall away from faith) and the noun skandalon (an enticement to unbelief or seduction). Apostasy is an intelligent decision to renounce one's public association with Jesus Christ. Ultimately, this act is viewed not merely as a loss of a state of grace, but as the forsaking of a personal relationship with God.

=== Dangers ===
Scholars identify four primary biblical dangers that serve as precursors to apostasy: persecution by unbelievers, accepting false doctrine, the temptation to sin, and weariness in faith. The New Testament warnings regarding these threats are real, not hypothetical. A believer is not eternally secure until securely in eternity, and apostasy represents a conscious rebellion rather than an accidental falling away.

Since Arminians view sin as an attitude constituting a denial of faith, persistent sin can eventually lead a believer to become an unbeliever and share in their same doom. The warnings to persevere are therefore directed exclusively to believers, as they alone have something to persevere toward or apostatize from. These warnings function as moral injunctions to strengthen one's commitment to holiness, demonstrating that trusting in Christ starves off apostasy.

== Biblical support ==
=== Old Testament ===
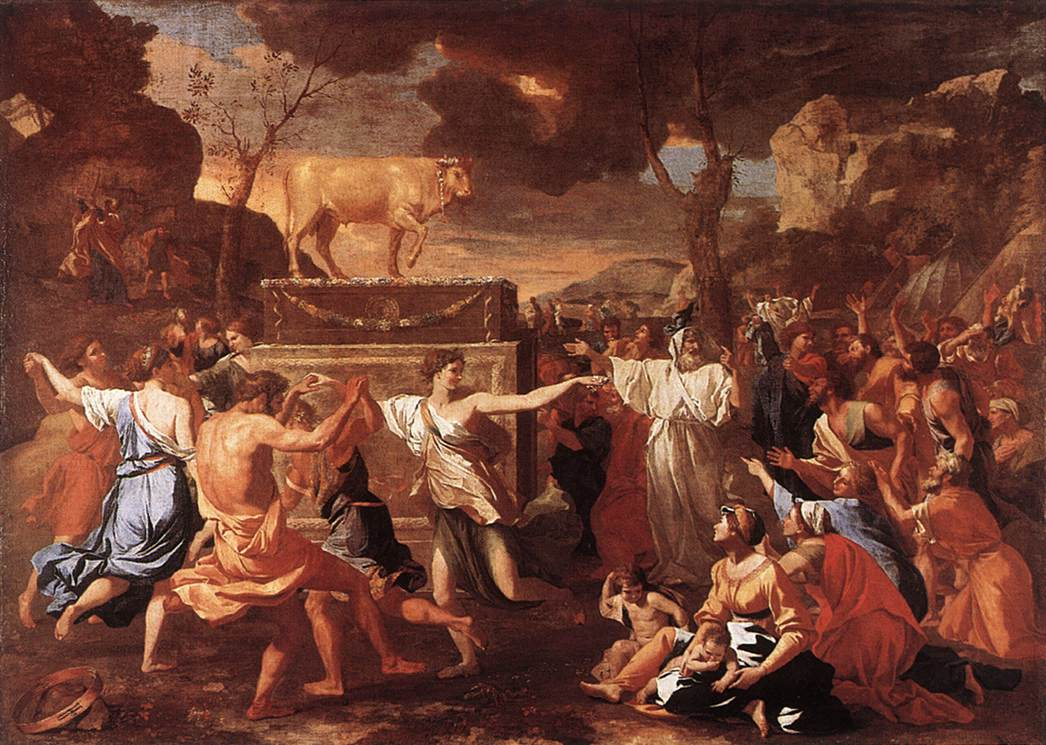
The Adoration of the Golden Calf, Nicolas Poussin, 1633-1634.

Arminians find support for conditional security in the Old Testament by pointing to divine warnings against idolatry and rebellion. In passages like Deuteronomy 29:18-20, Moses warns the Israelites that any person whose heart turns away from the Lord to worship other gods will face the curses written in the book, emphasizing that an apostate cannot presume safety while persisting in their own way. Furthermore, in 2 Chronicles 15:1-2, it is demonstrated that God remains with his people while they seek him, but will forsake those who abandon him. Finally, Ezekiel 18:20-24 demonstrates that if a righteous person turns away from their righteousness to commit iniquity, their past righteous deeds will not be remembered, and they will die in their sin.

=== Teachings of Jesus ===
In the Synoptic Gospels, Jesus frequently warns his disciples about the dangers of apostasy. He emphasizes that living in obedience is a necessity for entering the kingdom (Matthew 7:21). Jesus uses stark metaphors, such as severing a hand or an eye (Matthew 5:27-30), to describe the extreme measures believers must take to avoid falling away and facing eternal judgment in Gehenna. Denying Christ before others constitutes an open apostasy, bringing a strong warning that Christ will deny such individuals before the Father (Matthew 10:32-33).

In Matthew 18:6-9, Jesus warns that anyone causing a vulnerable believer to stumble is threatened with perdition, while the parable of the lost sheep illustrates God's concern that disciples not wander off into sin or false belief. They must be rescued before they commit apostasy, lest they face eternal doom and eternal perdition. The parable implies that going astray is possible, and the stray sheep may not always be recovered. Furthermore, parables such as the unfaithful servant demonstrate that believers entrusted with responsibilities can become apostates by violating Jesus' commands, thereby being assigned a place with hypocrites in hell. Jesus also predicts that many Christians will be deceived and fall away (Matthew 24:9-14), demonstrating that followers must persevere to avoid the loss of eternal salvation.

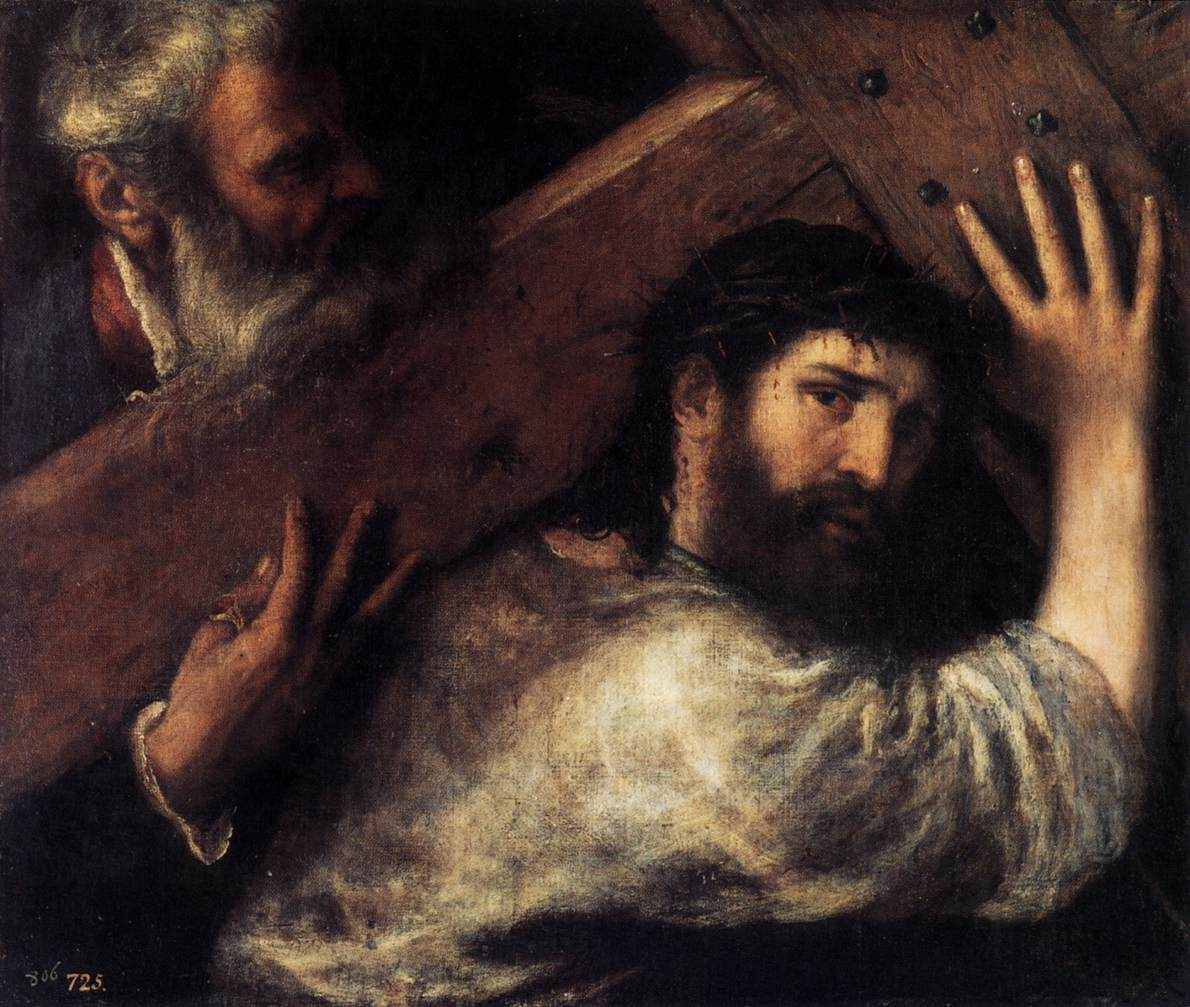
Christ Carrying the Cross, Titian, c. 1565.

Jesus' teachings in Mark and Luke echo these warnings, requiring believers to take up their crosses in self-denial. He encourages disciples to look beyond temporal life to receive eternal life, warning them not to forfeit their souls (Mark 8:34-38). Jesus pronounces an ominous warning against influencing a believing child to commit apostasy, emphasizing that yielding to temptations and sin can result in being cast into Gehenna (Mark 9:42-50). The parable of the sower in Luke highlights that while some receive the word with joy, they lack root and fall away in times of testing, indicating apostasy (Luke 8:11-13). Furthermore, the unfaithful manager in Luke 12:42-46 represents a true disciple who persists in acting like an unbeliever during the master's absence, ultimately sharing the fate of unbelievers in eternal damnation.

In the Gospel of John, Jesus compares believers to branches in the True Vine. He warns that branches that do not remain in Him and cease bearing fruit will be severed and cast into the fire, symbolizing ultimate apostasy and final judgment. He similarly warns disciples that loving their lives in this world will cause them to forfeit eternal life (John 12:24-26).

=== Book of Acts ===
In the Book of Acts, Paul warns new Christians that they must endure hardships to enter the kingdom, showing that remaining true to the faith is a condition for future salvation. Furthermore, Paul's tearful warning to the Ephesian elders anticipates that false teachers, some arising from the elders themselves, would draw disciples into spiritual apostasy (Acts 20:28-32).

=== Writings of the apostle Paul ===
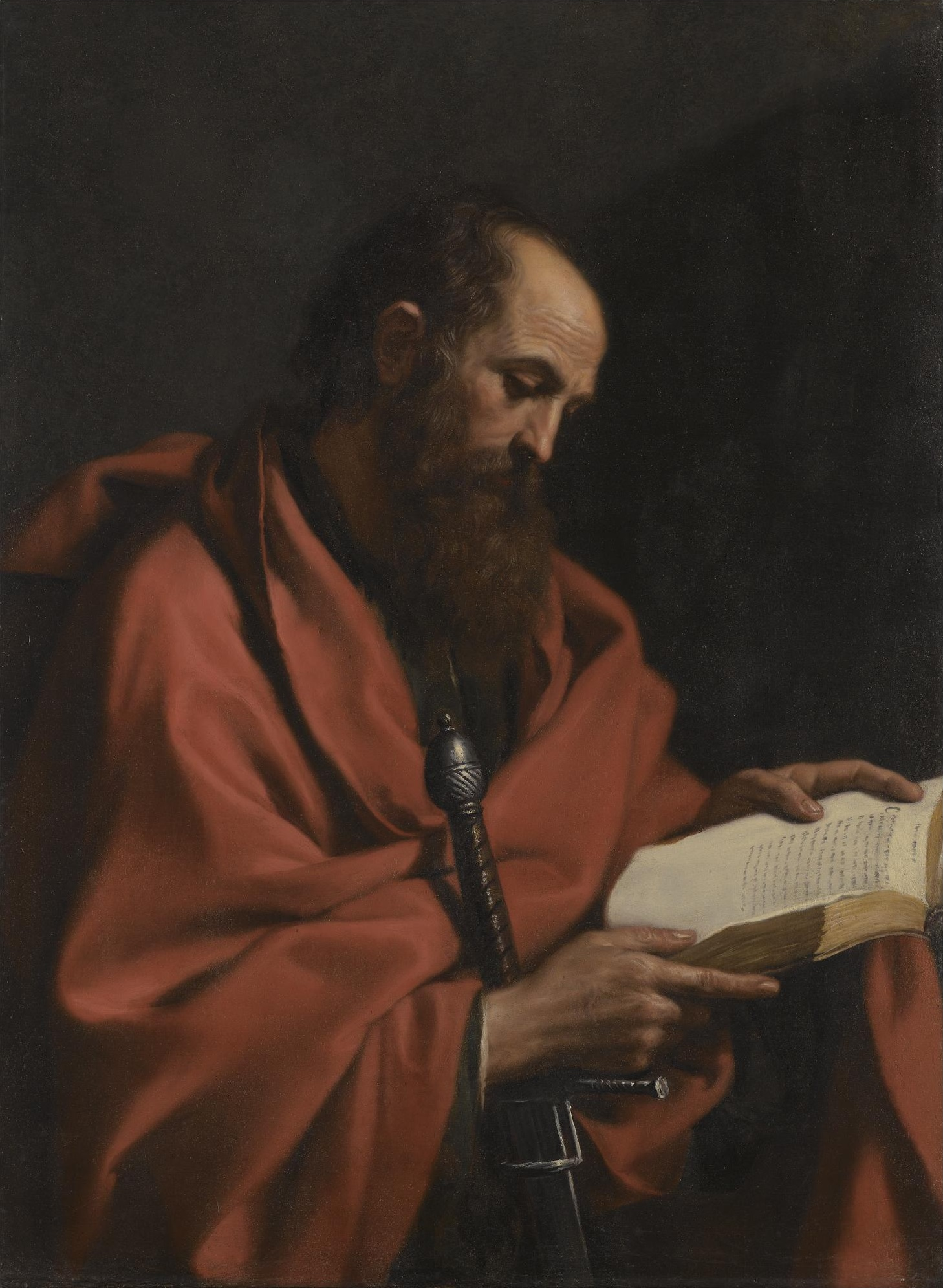
Saint Paul, Guercino.

In his epistles to the Romans and Corinthians, Paul repeatedly warns believers that if they live according to the flesh, return to idolatry, or violate their consciences, they face eternal ruin. Believers exercising their freedom unlovingly can destroy the weak for whom Christ died, leading to actual loss of salvation. Paul states that false teachers can destroy one's faith, causing apostasy (Romans 16:17-20). Inside the church, destructive behavior places salvation at risk (1 Corinthians 3:16-17), and believers persisting in wickedness will not inherit the kingdom (1 Corinthians 6:7-11).

Paul employs the metaphor of an athletic race to demonstrate the danger of being disqualified from eternal life due to a lack of self-control (1 Corinthians 9:24-27). By pointing to the wilderness generation of Israel who perished due to idolatry, Paul warns the Corinthians to take heed lest they fall (1 Corinthians 10). He stresses that their standing is not permanent but depends on continuing faithfulness, warning that they will not achieve final salvation if they persist in disobedience. The metaphor of falling clearly designates apostasy from the faith, and Paul reminds them they are being saved only if they hold fast to the gospel (1 Corinthians 15:1-2). He also expresses fear that the Corinthians might be seduced by a false gospel, risking damnation (2 Corinthians 11:1-15).

In Galatians, Paul warns Gentile believers that yielding to false teachers and returning to the works of the Law means they are severed from Christ and have fallen from grace (Galatians 5:1-6). This constitutes a reversal of justification and a cessation of faith in Christ. He stresses that if they sow to the flesh, they will reap corruption, which represents eternal destruction and exclusion from God's kingdom. Paul likewise warns the Ephesians that participating in the sins of unbelievers will cause them to forfeit their inheritance in the kingdom of Christ. He teaches the Colossians that reconciliation is conditioned upon continuing in faith (Colossians 1:21-23), and fears that the Thessalonians might commit apostasy due to Satan's temptations.

Paul repeatedly instructs Timothy to wage spiritual warfare and preserve a good conscience, referencing Hymenaeus and Alexander, who made shipwreck of their faith and became apostates (1 Timothy 1:18-20). He prophesies that some faithful church members will fall away by devoting themselves to demonic teachings (1 Timothy 4:1-5), urging Timothy to persevere to ensure salvation for himself and his hearers. A trustworthy saying warns that if believers deny Christ, He will permanently deny them, highlighting the absolute necessity of enduring faith (2 Timothy 2:10-13).

=== Book of Hebrews ===
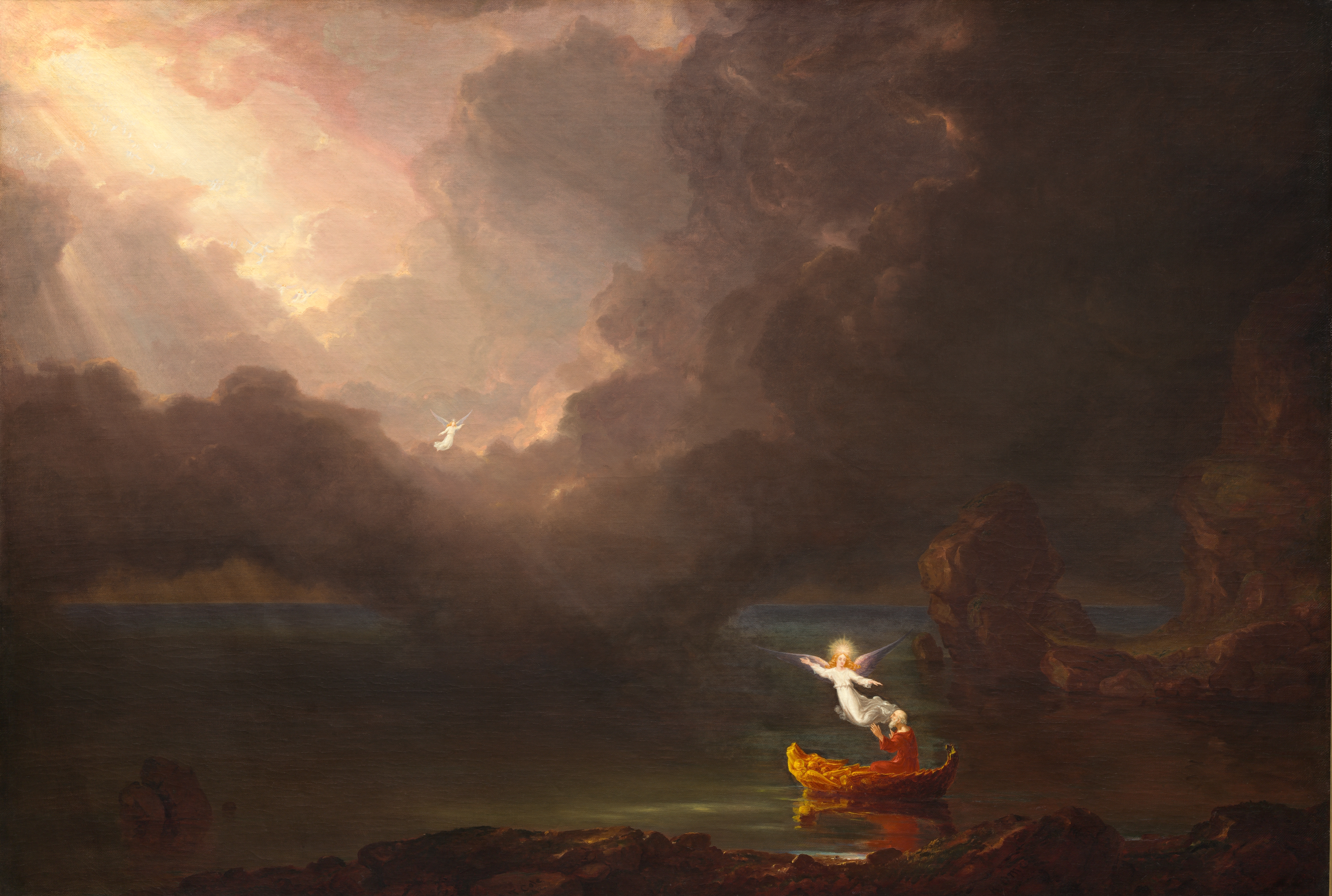
The Voyage of Life: Old Age, Thomas Cole, 1842.

In the Epistle to the Hebrews, the author systematically uses the rebellions of Israel in the wilderness as a cautionary parallel for Christians under the new covenant, warning that an evil, unbelieving heart leads to departing from the living God (Hebrews 3:12). The epistle contains what are perhaps the most severe warnings against apostasy in the entire New Testament.

The author cautions his audience to pay careful attention to the gospel so they do not drift away, employing the Greek verb pararreō, which carries nautical overtones that suggest a believer could be spiritually shipwrecked or lost at sea (Hebrews 2:1-4). Ignoring this great salvation leaves no possibility of escape from punishment in hellfire, demonstrating that Christian apostates stand to lose their eternal salvation. By using inclusive pronouns like "we," the author implies that he too is susceptible to these dangers of apostasy.

In Hebrews 3:7-19, the text describes how the wilderness generation shared in the initial Passover deliverance by faith, but afterward hardened their hearts and perished. The warning against unbelief frames the admonition to maintain faith, illustrating that apostasy is not merely a sudden decision but the culmination of a process of hardening the heart in unbelief. While suffering or temptation may provoke this defection, the root cause is always unbelief. To prevent this, believers must participate in a loving, nurturing community that encourages one another daily.

Drawing from this example of disobedience, believers are urged to fear falling short of God's promised rest (Hebrews 4:1-11). The author enlists the audience to share his concern that some of them might apostatize and fail to enter this rest. This promised rest (katapausis) requires a diligent faith and is not an earthly destination like Canaan, but a heavenly rest representing eternal salvation or life with God after death. It correlates with other future and transcendent images of salvation in Hebrews, such as the heavenly Jerusalem and the unshakable kingdom. The loss of this rest remains a true possibility if a believer falls into apostasy, leading to eschatological ruin. Falling (piptō) in this context is the result of disobedience and means apostasy.

The author notes that Jesus is the source of eternal salvation exclusively to those who obey him (Hebrews 5:8-9), utilizing a Greek present participle that implies continuous obedience. This implies that believers who cease to obey forfeit this Messianic and spiritual salvation. Later, severe warnings address those who have been enlightened and shared in the Holy Spirit but then fall away, asserting it is impossible to restore them to repentance because they crucify the Son of God once again (Hebrews 6:4-8). Similarly, if believers deliberately go on sinning after receiving the knowledge of the truth, they face a fearful expectation of judgment and a fury of fire (Hebrews 10:26-31). The author contrasts living by faith with shrinking back (Hebrews 10:37-39), clarifying that shrinking back out of timidity or cowardice leads to apostasy. This results in eternal destruction (apōleia), the definitive opposite of the soul's salvation.

Employing the metaphor of an athletic footrace, believers are exhorted to lay aside every weight and the sin that clings closely, which represents pre-conversion impediments (Hebrews 12:1-13). The runners must keep their eyes focused on Jesus to avoid spiritual fatigue. Enduring divine discipline (paideia) is required, functioning as non-punitive training that fosters virtuous living. If a believer submits to this discipline, they will receive life (zaō), enjoying admission to Christ's eternal kingdom. Conversely, a dislocated joint (ektrepō) implies apostasy as the negative outcome if the spiritually fatigued runner is not healed and fails to reach the finish line.

Believers must pursue holiness, without which no one will see the Lord in the beatific vision, and watch continually (episkopeo) lest anyone fall short of the grace of God (Hebrews 12:14-17). The author lists three dangers: missing the grace of God, a bitter root defiling many, and godless behavior. The example of Esau exchanging his spiritual inheritance for temporary physical gratification represents apostate persons who turn their backs on God's promises. His tears of regret show that after such apostasy, God may not grant a second opportunity for repentance. Finally, the epistle culminates in a warning not to refuse God's voice from heaven. Because God is a consuming fire, if the Christian community commits apostasy by turning away (apostrephō) from His message, they will be consumed by a fiery punishment at the eschaton (Hebrews 12:18-29). Thus, believers are exhorted to worship God acceptably with reverence and awe.

=== Book of James ===
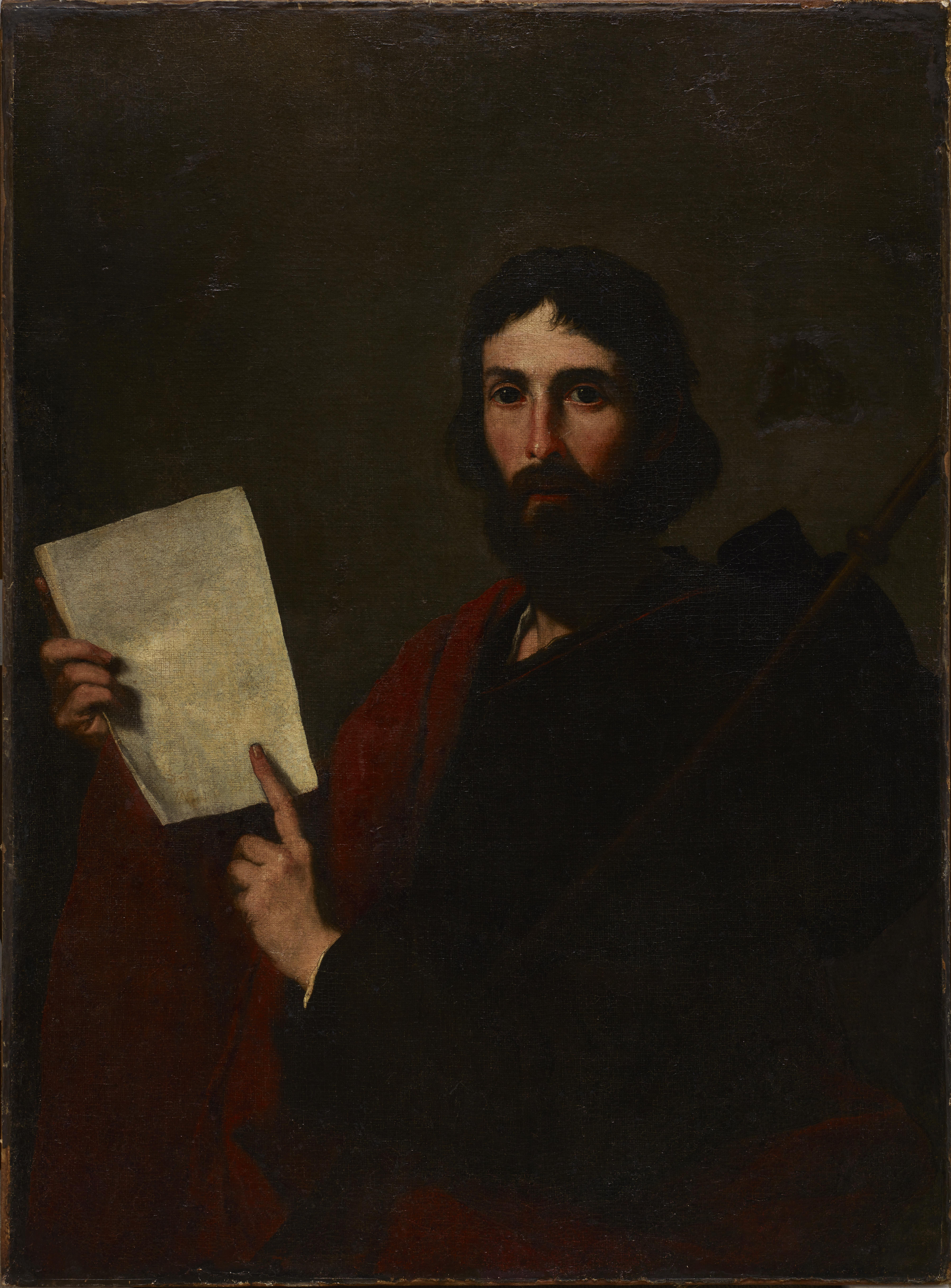
Saint James the Greater, Jusepe de Ribera.

In James chapter 1, the text indicates that the person who perseveres under trial is blessed because they will receive the crown of life (James 1:12). The word "blessed" carries both present and future connotations. Those who have persevered in trusting and loving the Lord in the face of trials are qualified to be called blessed. The promised "crown of life" is a metaphorical expression for eternal life, representing the life of the age to come and inheriting the kingdom of God (James 2:5). This love for God is the outcome of their faith, which produces willing endurance, since trials test a Christian's love as well as faith.

Furthermore, James 5:19-20 states that if a Christian wanders from the truth, the one who brings this sinner back will save their soul from death. The text addresses a situation where a Christian brother or sister has fallen into sins, such as greed or partiality, going the wrong way toward the broad path of death. The death from which the erring believer is saved is not merely physical death, but spiritual and eternal death. Both testaments view death as the ultimate result of sin, culminating in eternal condemnation at the last judgment, a concept already mentioned in James 1:15 where desire gives birth to sin, resulting in death. Greek lexicons confirm that the verb "save" (sōzō) in this context refers to preserving a person from eternal death. Therefore, James warns that a Christian may err from the way of life, but a successful rescue effort will deliver that erring person from eternal damnation by covering their multitude of sins.

=== Books of 2 Peter and Jude ===
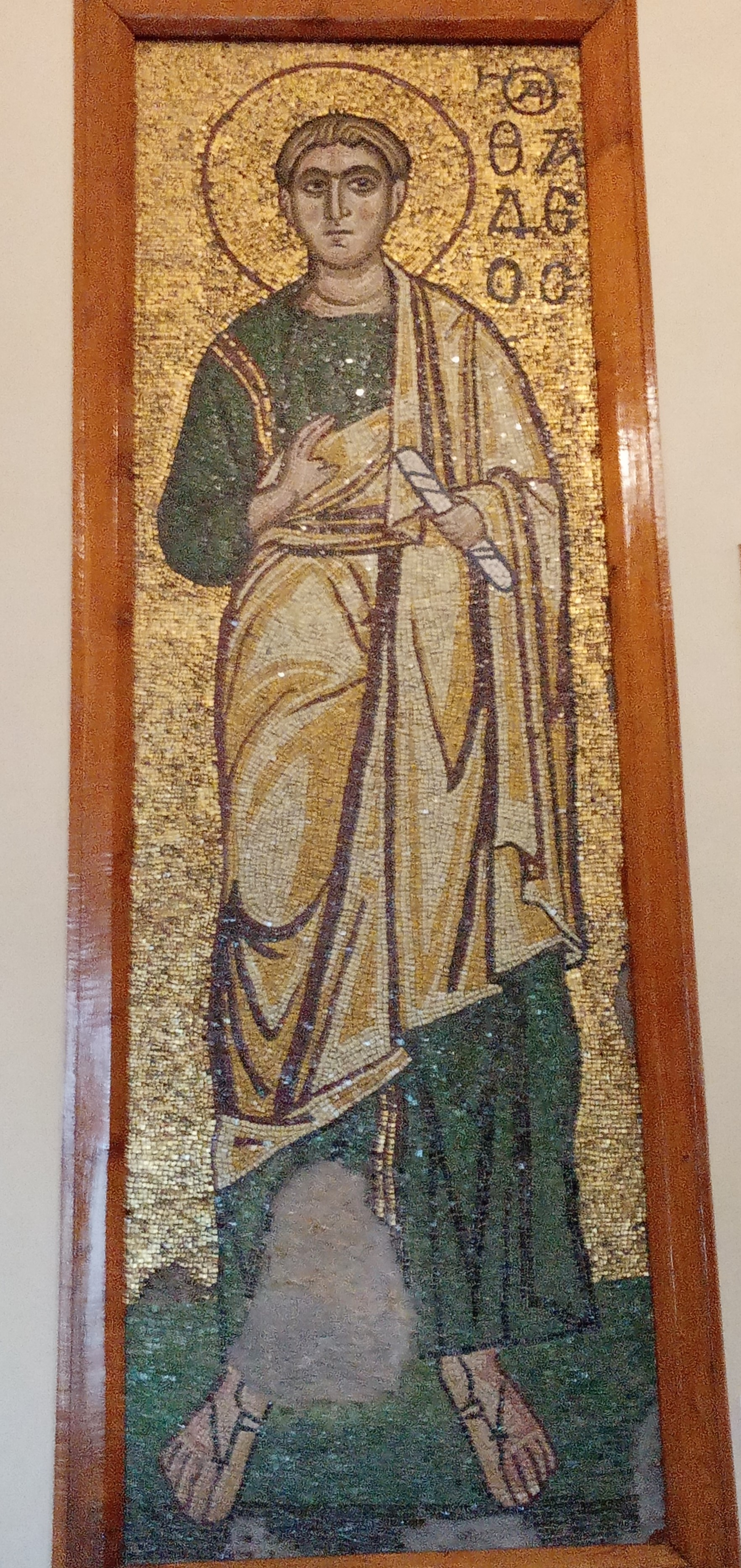
Apostle Thaddeus, Anonymous, c. 1108.

In 2 Peter 1:5-11, believers are strongly encouraged to develop a chain of Christian virtues. Trusting God is the root from which all these virtues spring, functioning as the basis for a life of active obedience. The apostle states that if believers practice these qualities, they will never fall, and will receive a rich welcome into the eternal kingdom of their Lord. Conversely, a believer who fails to grow in grace becomes spiritually blind and forgets they were cleansed from their past sins. The implication is that without this moral living, one will not enter the kingdom. Peter points out that a wrong moral example from false teachers might encourage Christians to follow in their footsteps, making apostasy a real danger.

In chapter 2, Peter uses the analogies of a dog returning to its vomit and a washed sow returning to the mire to describe individuals who escaped the defilements of the world through the knowledge of Christ, but later became entangled in them again and were overcome (2 Peter 2:20-22). This implies they had fully embraced the way of righteousness, which is the moral life demanded of those who belong to God, but subsequently abandoned it. Because they turned their backs on the sacred command passed on to them, their latter state is worse than their former state. This text illustrates a real apostasy from genuine Christianity, demonstrating that those who were truly saved can fall into a worse condition of spiritual ruin.

Jude similarly warns believers against the influence of ungodly individuals who pervert the grace of God into a license for immorality. He reminds his readers that God delivered a people out of Egypt, but later destroyed those who did not believe (Jude 5). He parallels this with the angels who did not keep their proper domain but abandoned their own abode, who are now kept in eternal chains for judgment (Jude 6). By comparing these events, Jude emphasizes that past deliverance does not guarantee future security if one rebels or falls into unbelief. Jude urges his audience to build themselves up in their most holy faith and to keep themselves in God's love (Jude 20-21). In 2 Peter 3:17, Peter echoes this by warning believers to be on their guard so that they are not carried away by the error of the lawless and fall from their secure position (ekpiptō). He concludes that the strongest antidote against the destructive lures of false teachers and apostasy is a Christian life that is constantly growing in the grace and knowledge of the Lord.

=== Epistles of John ===
In his epistles, John addresses the threat of false teachers and antichrists who have gone out from the community, demonstrating that they did not truly belong to it (1 John 2:18-19). However, he issues a direct warning to the remaining believers: they must ensure that what they have heard from the beginning remains in them. If it does, they will remain in the Son and in the Father (1 John 2:24). This indicates that their ongoing relationship with God is contingent on their continuing to hold to the apostolic truth. John emphasizes that anyone who runs ahead and does not continue in the teaching of Christ does not have God; whoever continues in the teaching has both the Father and the Son (2 John 9).

Furthermore, John describes a "sin that leads to death" (1 John 5:16). While interpretations of this difficult verse vary, Arminians often understand this sin not merely as a moral lapse, but as a deliberate apostasy or total repudiation of faith. Committing such a sin leads to spiritual death, definitively severing the individual's relationship with God, distinguishing it from other sins for which believers can seek and receive forgiveness.

=== Book of Revelation ===
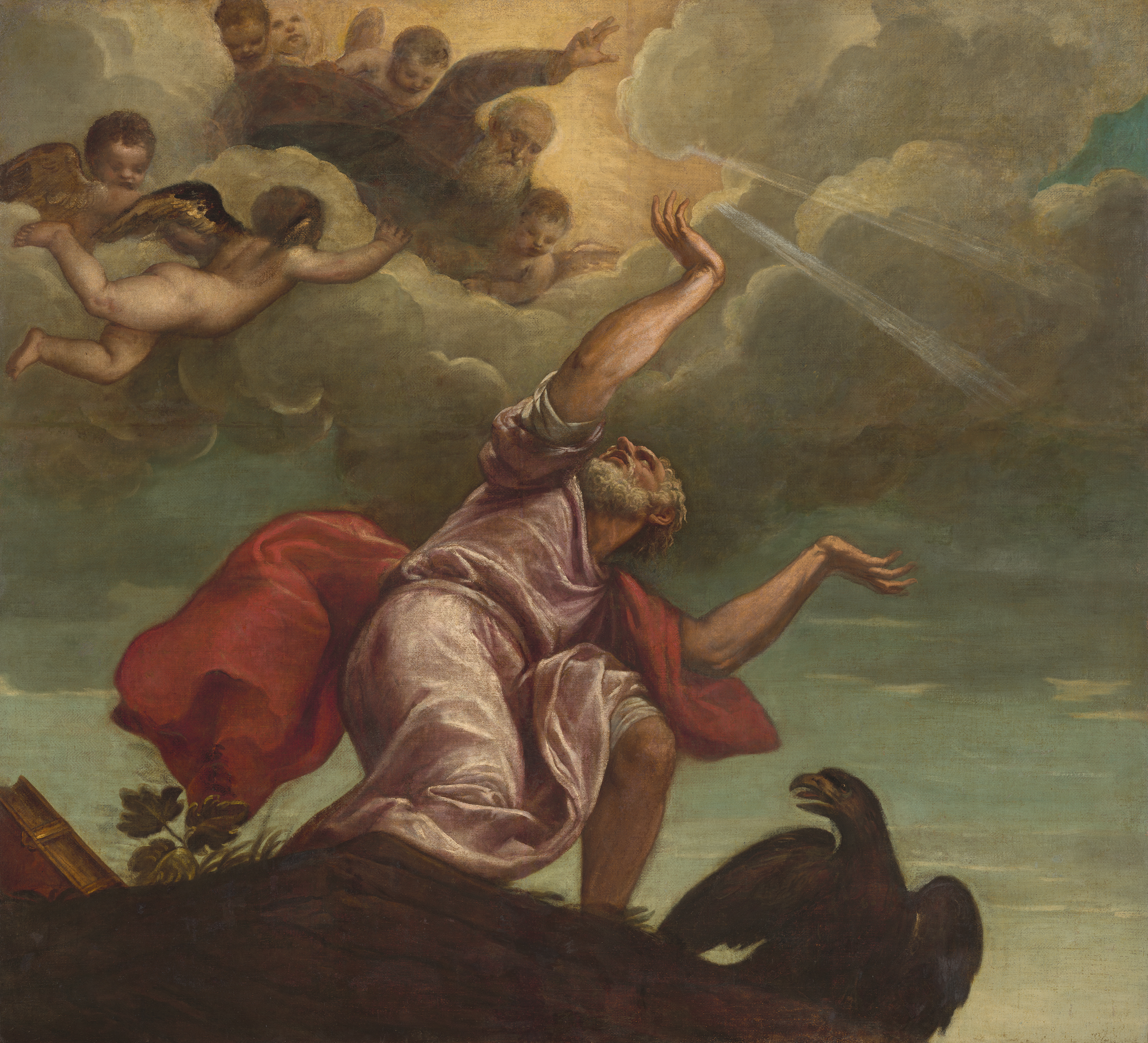
Saint John the Evangelist on Patmos, Titian and workshop, c. 1553-1555.

A major theme in the book of Revelation concerns the Greek verb "nikaō", which means to conquer, overcome, or get the victory. It appears eight times as a present participle, literally translated as "the one overcoming", which suggests a timeless demand for continuous victory on the part of the believer. Thus, Christians are in the process of conquering, and they will receive the promises only if they carry out this process to its completion. Overcoming implies persevering in faith and holding fast to it against the power of foes, temptations, and persecutions.

Each of the seven churches is given a conditional promise that contains some form of the anticipation of eternal life or final salvation in the new Jerusalem. The final promise in Revelation 21:7 confirms this, stating that the one overcoming will inherit the blessings of eschatological salvation. These promises illustrate the primary motivational strategy of the author, because final salvation is dependent upon a human response of overcoming, which is the only way for Christians to reach their eschatological destiny. Conversely, failure to overcome necessarily entails failure to receive the promises and the resultant exclusion from God's new creation.

For example, Jesus encourages the church in Smyrna to be faithful until death to receive the crown of life, and to avoid being hurt by the second death (Revelation 2:10-11). This requires believers to continually prove faithful in the midst of the devil's efforts to lead them into apostasy. The crown of life represents eternal life in the coming Kingdom, granted to those who are persevering in faith against antichristian powers.

Similarly, the Philadelphian Christians are praised for their patient endurance, but they are warned to hold fast to what they have so that no one may take away their crown (Revelation 3:10-11). This athletic metaphor of being disqualified warns that the crown of eternal life is a present possession that can be taken away if a believer fails to remain faithful. Believers must be on guard against imperial pressure, false doctrine, and spiritual inertia, which might overcome them and cause them to forfeit eternal life.

The section of Revelation 21:1-8 concludes with a stark warning, contrasting the conqueror who inherits all things with the cowardly and unfaithful who are cast into the lake of fire. Christians must decide whether to be conquerors or cowards. In this context, the cowardly are Christians who lack the courage to offer faithful witness during times of persecution, ultimately relinquishing their faith and becoming apostate unbelievers. The term "unfaithful" stands opposite to faith, describing those who turn their backs on Jesus. Placing them in the lake of fire intentionally warns the faithful against the extreme danger of spiritual and moral apostasy.

Finally, the book ends with a severe warning against adding to or taking away from the words of the prophecy (Revelation 22:18-19). This condemns distorting the message to justify disobedience, idolatry, or immorality. If a believer changes the message to allow disobedience, they commit apostasy and are treated as unbelievers who suffer the plagues described in the book. Their share in the tree of life and the holy city is taken away, demonstrating that failure to keep the prophecy disqualifies one from eternal salvation. This final warning indicates that the author believed a person could commit apostasy and have their privilege of eternal salvation revoked.

=== New Testament Greek evidence ===
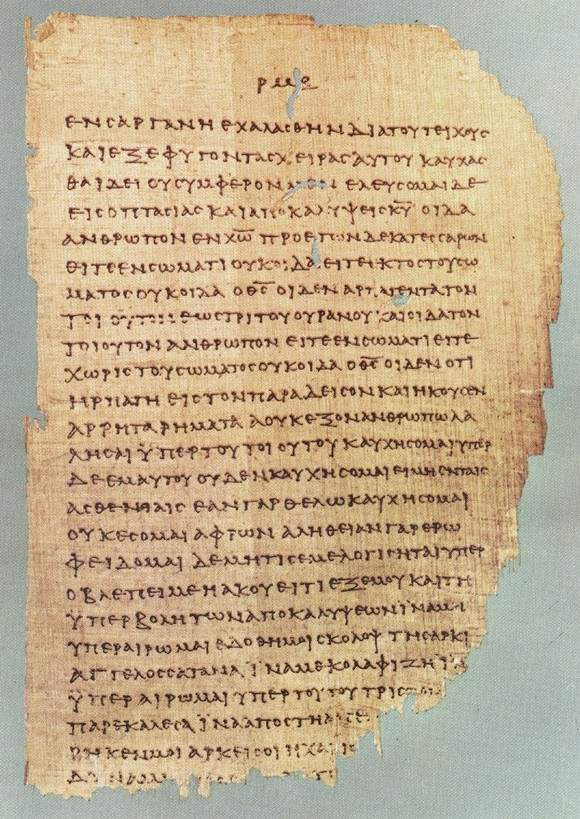
Papyrus 46, Anonymous.

Arminians find further support for conditional security from the numerous instances where the Greek verb for "believes" occurs in the present tense, specifically as a present participle. Many Greek scholars, spanning various theological traditions, confirm that present tense verbs in soteriological contexts denote an ongoing action rather than a singular event.

Calvinist grammarians also recognize this distinction. For example, the Greek present participle for "the one believing" (ho pisteuōn) is used significantly more often in soteriological contexts than the aorist participle for "the one having believed" (ho pisteusas). The present tense was likely the tense of choice because the New Testament writers largely saw continual belief as a necessary condition of salvation. Consequently, the promise of salvation is almost exclusively given to the one who is actively believing, and rarely to the one who merely believed in the past.

This grammatical reality is evident in numerous literal translations of passages concerning eternal life. Texts such as John 3:15-16, John 3:36, John 5:24, and Romans 1:16 utilize the present participle to emphasize "the one believing". Furthermore, the results of this belief are often presented in a continuous tense, meaning that as a person keeps believing, they keep on having eternal life.

Based on this linguistic evidence, Arminians conclude that eternal assurance is firmly promised to the person who continues to trust in Christ, but not to someone who merely exercised a single act of faith at a point in the past. Ultimately, just as becoming saved is conditioned upon faith, staying saved is conditioned upon a living and continuing belief.

== Theological perspectives and opposing views ==
=== Calvinist view ===
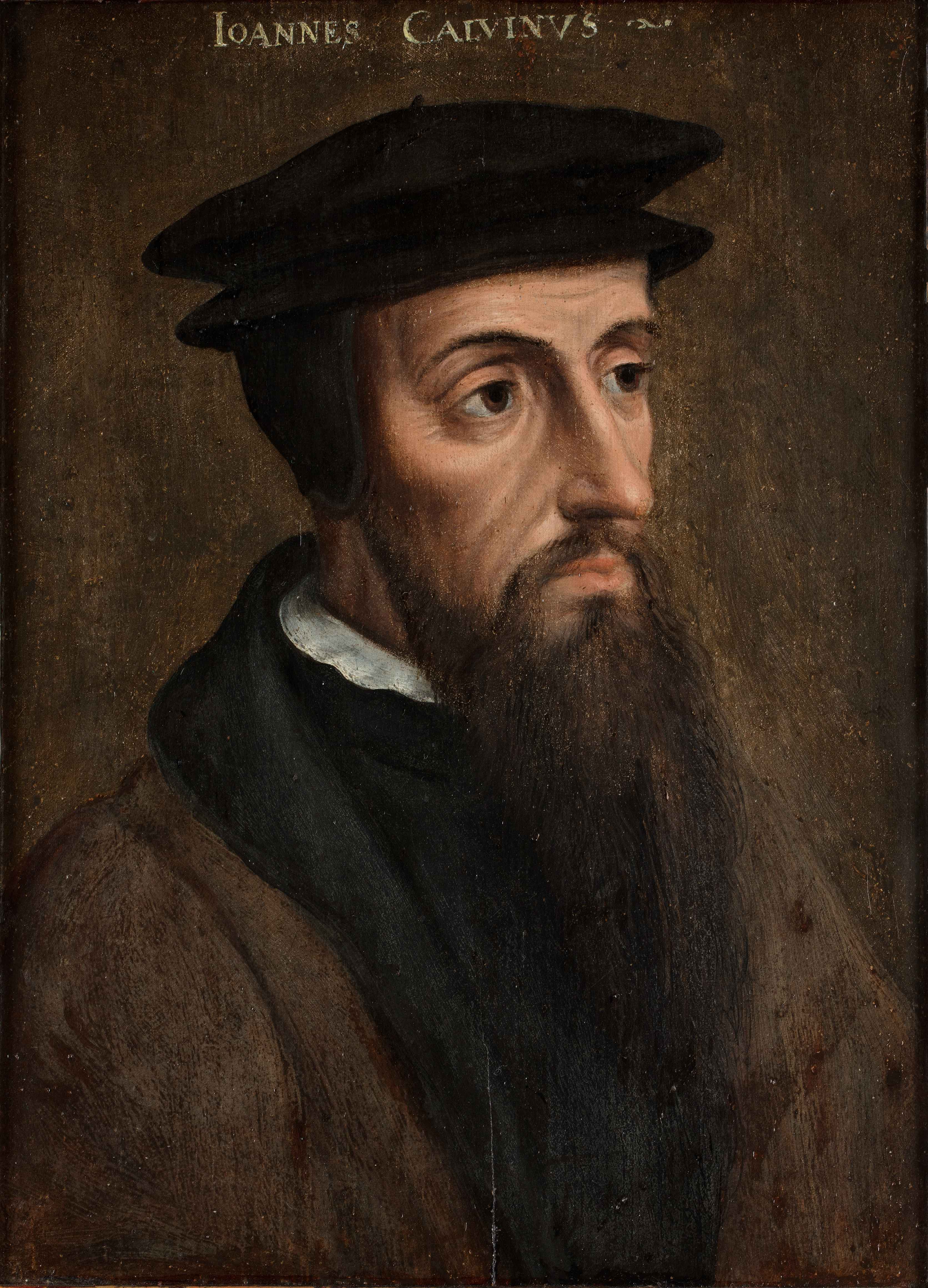
Portrait of John Calvin, Anonymous, 16th century.

Within Calvinist soteriology, spiritual regeneration wrought by the Holy Spirit is permanent and necessarily culminates in final salvation. In Calvin's theology, divine predestination unconditionally elects some to eternal life while passing over others, thereby ensuring that the truly elect cannot experience final perdition (Calvin's Institutes 3.21:5; cf. 3.2:15-40, 14.6-9, 18-20, 24.6f.). Consequently, apostasy is not possible for true believers. Although true believers may experience temporary moral lapses, divine grace ensures their eventual restoration. Calvin understood scriptural warnings against apostasy as providential means of cultivating vigilance among the elect. He therefore interpreted the severe warnings in Hebrews (6:4-6; 10:26-29) as referring exclusively to reprobate members of the church who lacked genuine regeneration. To explain this phenomenon of apparent apostasy, he postulated that common grace might include effects indistinguishable from effectual calling and subsequent irresistible grace. Thus, Calvin formulated the concept of a temporary grace, sometimes called "evanescent grace", that appears and works for only a while in the reprobate before fading away. According to this concept, the Holy Spirit can produce in some people effects which are indistinguishable from those of the irresistible grace of God, also producing a visible "fruit" in their life. The doctrine of temporary grace, which explains apostasy as only apparent, was also upheld by later Calvinist theologians such as Theodore Beza, William Perkins, John Owen, A. W. Pink and Loraine Boettner. A common corollary is that, within this framework of perseverance of the saints, one's status as a true Christian is demonstrated only by perseverance to the end. The Calvinist doctrine of unconditional perseverance was articulated in various Reformed confessions of faith such as the Canons of the Synod of Dort (1619) and the Westminster Confession of Faith (1646).

Both traditional Calvinists and Arminians agree that continuing faith is necessary for final salvation; they simply differ on whether all true believers will actually persist.

=== Free Grace view ===
Originating in the 1980s, Free grace theology advocates an absolute form of eternal security, positing that an individual who has genuinely experienced regeneration can never forfeit eternal salvation, regardless of subsequent conduct or beliefs. Instead of losing their saving relationship with God, an unfaithful believer merely forfeits the opportunity to reign with Christ in his coming kingdom or to receive a special place of reward.

== Cross-denominational support ==
=== Orthodoxy ===
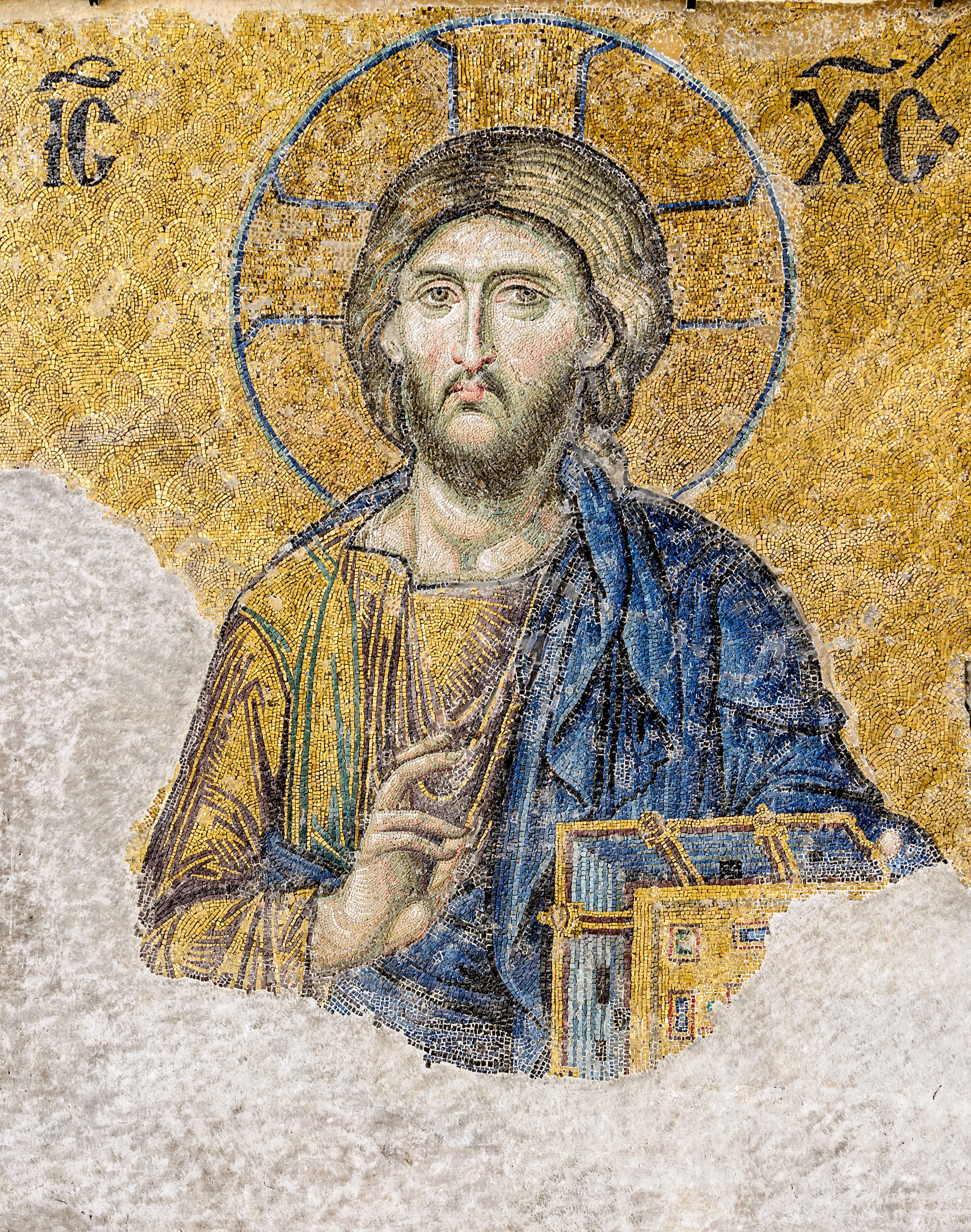
Christ Pantocrator, Anonymous, 13th century.

The Eastern Orthodox Church supports conditional security and the potential for defection through its traditional liturgical and theological resources.

=== Catholicism ===
In Catholicism, apostasy constitutes the total repudiation of the Christian faith, incurring a latae sententiae excommunication. Theologians like Thomas Aquinas concurred that justified believers require ongoing divine grace, without which they can fall into mortal sin and lose their salvation.

=== Anabaptism ===
Within the Anabaptist tradition, bodies such as the Mennonite Church and the Missionary Church maintain that believers retain free moral agency and can consequently turn away from salvation.

=== Lutheranism ===
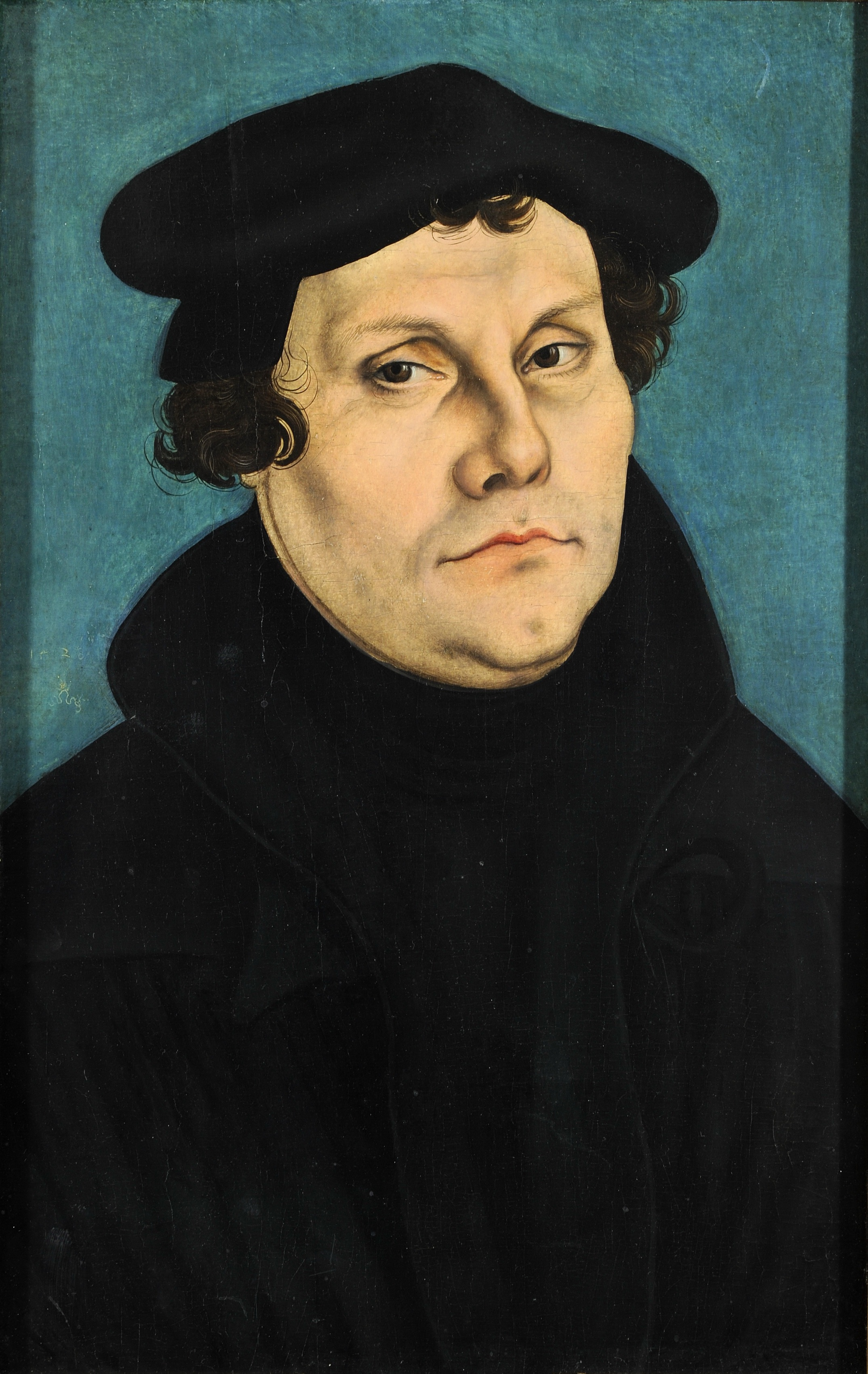
Portrait of Martin Luther, Lucas Cranach the Elder, 1529.

Martin Luther affirmed that baptismal grace can be lost, warning that falling from grace subjects backsliders to divine wrath. The Smalcald Articles of Lutheranism establish that justifying faith and the indwelling Holy Spirit cannot coexist with unrepented mortal sin, affirming that a genuinely regenerate believer can finally fall away, teaching that even regenerate saints who fall into manifest wickedness forfeit their state of grace. In the Apology of the Augsburg Confession, Philip Melanchthon rejects the notion that faith is mere historical knowledge coexist with deliberate sin. Melanchthon articulated that willingly indulging mortal sin without repentance inevitably drives out the Holy Spirit and destroys justifying faith. Confessional Lutheranism affirms through the Formula of Concord that justifying faith is forfeited whenever individuals willfully turn away from God's commandments.

=== Anglicanism ===
Anglicanism recognizes sin after baptism and the genuine possibility of departing from divine grace.

=== Arminian traditions ===
Arminian theology heavily influenced subsequent Protestant traditions, leading to several distinct denominational families that affirm conditional security.

==== General Baptists ====
Early General Baptists, through figures like Thomas Helwys (1575-1616) and Thomas Grantham (1634-1692), explicitly taught conditional security. Groups like the General Association of General Baptists and the National Association of Free Will Baptists continue to emphasize that regenerate individuals must watch and pray lest they make shipwreck of their faith.

==== Methodism ====
John Wesley firmly rejected the doctrine of unconditional final perseverance. This Arminian understanding of conditional preservation was later defended by Methodist thinkers such as Thomas O. Summers, and William Burt Pope. It continued to influence Wesleyan and Holiness traditions, such as the United Methodist Church, the Salvation Army, the Church of God (Anderson, Indiana), and the Church of the Nazarene.

==== Pentecostalism ====
Pentecostal denominations like the Assemblies of God maintain that believers remain free to depart from grace and lose their status in Christ.

=== Quakerism ===
In the Quaker tradition, some churches affirm conditional security and the threat of apostasy, such as the Evangelical Friends Church - Eastern Region.

=== Restorationist traditions ===
Within Restorationist traditions, including the Churches of Christ, recognized scholars affirm conditional security and the possibility of apostasy.

== See also ==
- Antinomianism
- Apostasy in Christianity
- Arminianism
- Backsliding
- Eternal security
- Eternal sin
- Perseverance of the saints
- Synergism

== Notes and references ==
=== Sources ===
- AG (2017). "Assurance-Of-Salvation: Position paper". AG.
- Abbott-Smith, G. (1922). A Manual Greek Lexicon of the New Testament. New York, NY: Scribner.
- Adams, J. Wesley (1992). "Hebrews". Life in the Spirit New Testament Commentary. Grand Rapids, MI: Zondervan.
- Adamson, James B. (1989). James: The Man & His Message. Grand Rapids, MI: Eerdmans.
- Alford, Henry (1874). The New Testament for English Readers. Boston, MA: Lee and Shepard.
- Anderson, Kevin L. (2001). Hebrews: A Commentary in the Wesleyan Tradition. Kansas City, MO: Beacon Hill Press.
- Arminius, James (1956a). The Works of Arminius. Grand Rapids, MI: Baker Book House.
- Arrington, French L. (2005). Unconditional Eternal Security: Myth or Truth?. Cleveland, TN: Pathway Press.
- Ashby, Stephen M. (2002). "Reformed Arminianism". In Pinson, J. Matthew (ed.). Four Views on Eternal Security. Grand Rapids, MI: Zondervan.
- Attridge, Harold (1989). Hebrews. Philadelphia, PA: Fortress Press.
- Aune, David E. (1966). "St John's Portrait of the Church in the Apocalypse". The Evangelical Quarterly. 38 (3): 131–149.
- Aune, David E. (1997). Revelation 1-5. Dallas, TX: Word Books.
- Aune, David E. (1998). Revelation 17-22. Nashville, TN: Thomas Nelson.
- Bangs, Nathan (1815). The Errors of Hopkinsianism Detected and Refuted. New York, NY: John C. Totten.
- Bangs, Nathan (1818). The Reformer Reformed. New York, NY: John C. Totten.
- Banks, John Shaw (1902). A Manual of Christian Doctrine. London: Charles H. Kelly.
- Barnes, Albert (1884). Notes on the New Testament: Hebrews to Jude. New York, NY: Harper & Brothers.
- Barnett, Paul (1997). "Apostasy". Dictionary of the Later New Testament and Its Developments. Downers Grove, IL: InterVarsity Press.
- Bassler, Jouette M. (1996). 1 & 2 Timothy and Titus. Nashville, TN: Abingdon Press.
- Bauckham, Richard (1983). Jude, 2 Peter. Word Biblical Commentary. Waco, TX: Word Books.
- Bauckham, Richard (1993). The Theology of the Book of Revelation. Cambridge: Cambridge University Press.
- Bauder, Wolfgang (1975). "Fall Away". In Brown, Colin (ed.). The New International Dictionary of New Testament Theology. Grand Rapids, MI: Zondervan.
- Bauer, Johannes B. (1970). Encyclopedia of Biblical Theology. London: Sheed and Ward.
- Beale, G. K. (2015). Revelation: A Shorter Commentary. Grand Rapids, MI: Eerdmans.
- Beare, Francis W. (1981). The Gospel according to Matthew. San Francisco, CA: Harper & Row.
- Beasley-Murray, G. R. (1997). "Revelation, Book of". Dictionary of the Later New Testament & Its Developments. Downers Grove, IL: InterVarsity Press.
- Beet, Joseph Agar (1906). A Manual of Theology. London: Hodder and Stoughton.
- Belleville, Linda L. (2009). 1 Timothy. Grand Rapids, MI: Zondervan.
- Benson, Joseph (2002). The Old Testament of our Lord and Savior Jesus Christ. Rio, WI: Ages Software Inc.
- Bercot, David W. (1989). Will the Real Heretics Please Stand Up: A New Look at Today's Evangelical Church in the Light of Early Christianity. Tyler, TX: Scroll Publishing.
- Binney, Amos (1875). Binney's Theological Compend: Improved. New York, NY: Nelson & Phillips.
- Blomberg, Craig L. (1992). Matthew. New American Commentary. Nashville, TN: Broadman Press.
- Bloomfield, S. T. (1841). A Greek and English Lexicon to the New Testament. London: Longman, Orme, Brown, Green, & Longmans.
- Boettner, Loraine (1932). The Reformed Doctrine of Predestination. Grand Rapids, MI: Eerdmans.
- Bracey, Matthew Steven (25 August 2022). "A Historical Sketch of Thomas Helwys". Helwys Society Forum.
- Bratcher, Robert G. (1984). A Translator's Guide to the Revelation to John. New York, NY: United Bible Societies.
- Brighton, Louis A. (1999). Revelation. Concordia Commentary. St. Louis, MO: Concordia Publishing House.
- Bruce, F. F. (1990). The Epistle to the Hebrews. Grand Rapids, MI: Eerdmans.
- Bruner, Frederick Dale (2004). Matthew: A Commentary. Grand Rapids, MI: Eerdmans.
- Butler, Paul T. (1965). The Gospel of John. Joplin, MO: College Press.
- Calvin, John (1961). Concerning the Eternal Predestination of God. London: James Clarke & Co. Limited.
- Calvin, John (1963). The Epistle to the Hebrews. Grand Rapids, MI: Eerdmans.
- Calvin, John (1845). Institutes of the Christian Religion; a New Translation by Henry Beveridge. Vol. 2. Translated by Henry Beveridge. Edinburgh: Calvin Translation Society. books 2, 3.
- Chrysostom, John (2006). "On the Epistle to the Hebrews". Ancient Christian Commentary on Scripture: Hebrews. Downers Grove, IL: InterVarsity Press.
- Church of England (1571a). "Article XVI: Of Sin after Baptism (Part 1)". The North American Anglican.
- Church of England (1571b). "Homily VIII: Of the declining from GOD". Anglican Library.
- Church of the Nazarene (2025). "Articles of Faith". Church of the Nazarene.
- Clarke, Adam (1831). A Commentary and Critical Notes on the Holy Bible Old and New Testaments. Rio, WI: Ages Software Inc.
- Clarke, Adam (1835). Christian Theology. New York, NY: Lane & Scott.
- Claybrook, Frederick W. Jr. (2003). Once Saved, Always Saved? A New Testament Study of Apostasy. Lanham, MD: University Press of America.
- Cockerill, Gareth Lee (2012). The Epistle to the Hebrews. New International Commentary on the New Testament. Grand Rapids, MI: Eerdmans.
- Colijn, Brenda (2010). Images of Salvation in the New Testament. Downers Grove, IL: InterVarsity Press.
- Cottrell, Jack (1996). Romans: Volume 1 & 2 (The College Press NIV Commentary). Joplin, MO: College Press.
- Cottrell, Jack (2002). The Faith Once for All: Bible Doctrine for Today. Joplin, MO: College Press.
- Crabtree, Jeffrey (2002). Matthew. Joplin, MO: College Press.
- Cremer, Hermann (1892). Biblico-Theological Lexicon of the New Testament Greek. Edinburgh: T. & T. Clark.
- Crouch, Owen (1983). Expository Preaching and Teaching: Hebrews. Joplin, MO: College Press.
- Curtis, Heath (8 July 2015). "Things you may have forgotten you believed in: Mortal Sin and the Loss of Salvation". Gottesdienst: The Journal of Lutheran Liturgy.
- Danker, Frederick W. (2000). A Greek-English Lexicon of the New Testament. Chicago, IL: University of Chicago Press.
- Das, A. Andrew (2014). Galatians. St. Louis, MO: Concordia Publishing House.
- Davids, Peter H. (1982). The Epistle of James. Grand Rapids, MI: Eerdmans.
- Davids, Peter H. (1984). "Crown". In Elwell, Walter A. (ed.). Evangelical Dictionary of Theology. Grand Rapids, MI: Baker Book House.
- Davids, Peter H. (1996). Hard Sayings of the Bible. Downers Grove, IL: InterVarsity Press.
- Davids, Peter H. (2006). The Letters of 2 Peter and Jude. Grand Rapids, MI: Eerdmans.
- Davids, Peter H. (2014). A Theology of James, Peter, and Jude. Grand Rapids, MI: Zondervan.
- Davies, W. D. (2004). Matthew: A Shorter Commentary. London: T & T Clark.
- Davis, John Jefferson (1991). "The Perseverance of the Saints: A History of the Doctrine" (PDF). Journal of the Evangelical Theological Society. 34 (2): 213–228.
- De Jong, Peter Y. (1968). "The Opinions of the Remonstrants (1618)". Crisis in the Reformed Churches: Essays in Commemoration of the Great Synod of Dordt, 1618-1619. Grand Rapids, MI: Reformed Fellowship. pp. 220–228.
- Delitzsch, Franz (1871). Commentary on the Epistle to the Hebrews. Edinburgh: T. & T. Clark.
- Dillow, Joseph C. (1992). The Reign of the Servant Kings: A Study of Eternal Security and the Final Significance of Man. Miami Springs, FL: Schoettle Publishing Company.
- Dowd, Sharyn (2000). Reading Mark. Macon, GA: Smyth & Helwys.
- Early, Joe Jr. (2009). The Life and Writings of Thomas Helwys. Macon, GA: Mercer University Press.
- Ellingworth, Paul (1993). The Epistle to the Hebrews. Grand Rapids, MI: Eerdmans.
- Ellis, Mark A. (2005). "Introduction". The Arminian Confession of 1621. Eugene, OR: Pickwick Publications. pp. vii–xviii.
- Episcopius, Simon (2005). The Arminian Confession of 1621. Translated by Mark A. Ellis. Eugene, OR: Pickwick Publications.
- Evangelical Friends Church - Eastern Region (2018). Faith and Practice. Canton, OH: EFC-ER.
- Farley, Lawrence R. (2001). The Apocalypse of St. John. Ben Lomond, CA: Conciliar Press.
- Fee, Gordon D. (1987). The First Epistle to the Corinthians. Grand Rapids, MI: Eerdmans.
- Fee, Gordon D. (1988). 1 and 2 Timothy, Titus. Peabody, MA: Hendrickson.
- Fee, Gordon D. (2007). Galatians. Blandford Forum, UK: Deo Publishing.
- Fernando, Ajith (1998). Acts. NIV Application Commentary. Grand Rapids, MI: Zondervan.
- Field, Benjamin (1870). The Student's Handbook of Christian Theology. London: Hodder and Stoughton.
- Findlay, George (1888). The Epistle to the Galatians. London: Hodder and Stoughton.
- Fletcher, John William (1851). The Works of the Reverend John Fletcher. Vol. 2. New York, NY: Lane & Scott.
- Foster, Randolph S. (1854). Calvinism As It Is. Cincinnati, OH: Swormstedt & Poe.
- France, R. T. (2002). The Gospel of Mark. Grand Rapids, MI: Eerdmans.
- France, R. T. (2005). "Hebrews". The Expositor's Bible Commentary. Grand Rapids, MI: Zondervan.
- France, R. T. (2007). The Gospel of Matthew. Grand Rapids, MI: Eerdmans.
- Frey, Jörg (2018). The Letter of Jude and the Second Letter of Peter. Waco, TX: Baylor University Press.
- GAGB (1970). "Statements of Faith" (PDF). General Baptist.
- Garland, David E. (1996). Mark. Grand Rapids, MI: Zondervan.
- Garland, David E. (1999). 2 Corinthians. New American Commentary. Nashville, TN: Broadman & Holman.
- Garland, David E. (2001). Reading Matthew. Macon, GA: Smyth & Helwys.
- Garland, David E. (2003). 1 Corinthians. Grand Rapids, MI: Baker Academic.
- Garlington, Don (2003). Exegetical Essays. Eugene, OR: Wipf and Stock.
- Garrett, James Leo (1995). Systematic Theology. Vol. 2. Grand Rapids, MI: Eerdmans.
- Giesen, Heinz (1990). Exegetical Dictionary of the New Testament. Grand Rapids, MI: Eerdmans.
- Goodwin, John (1840). Redemption Redeemed. London: Thomas Tegg.
- Gorman, Michael J. (2004). Apostle of the Crucified Lord. Grand Rapids, MI: Eerdmans.
- Gorman, Michael J. (2011). Reading Revelation Responsibly. Eugene, OR: Cascade Books.
- Grantham, Thomas (1678). Christianismus Primitivus. Vol. 2. London: Francis Smith.
- Grantham, Thomas (1691). A Dialogue Between the Baptist and the Presbyterian. London: n.p.
- Green, Gene L. (2002). The Letters to the Thessalonians. Grand Rapids, MI: Eerdmans.
- Green, Gene L. (2008). Baker Exegetical Commentary on the New Testament: Jude and Peter. Grand Rapids, MI: Baker Academic.
- Green, Michael (1987). The Second Epistle of Peter and the Epistle of Jude. Grand Rapids, MI: Eerdmans.
- Greenlee, J. Harold (1983). Words from the Word. Grand Rapids, MI: Eerdmans.
- Gribben, Crawford; Tweeddale, John W. (2022). T&T Clark Handbook of John Owen. London: T&T Clark.
- Grudem, Wayne (1994). Systematic Theology: An Introduction to Biblical Doctrine. Leicester, England & Grand Rapids, MI: Inter-Varsity Press & Zondervan.
- Gundry, Robert H. (2010). Commentary on the New Testament. Peabody, MA: Hendrickson.
- Haarbeck, H. (1975). "Crown". In Brown, Colin (ed.). New International Dictionary of New Testament Theology. Grand Rapids, MI: Zondervan.
- Hailey, Homer (1979). Revelation: An Introduction and Commentary. Grand Rapids, MI: Baker Book House.
- Hanson, G. Walter (1989). Galatians. Downers Grove, IL: InterVarsity Press.
- Hare, Douglas R. A. (2009). Matthew. Louisville, KY: Westminster John Knox Press.
- Harrison, Everett F. (1976). Baker's Dictionary of Theology. Grand Rapids, MI: Baker Book House.
- Harrison, Paul N. (1992). James. Peabody, MA: Hendrickson.
- Hartin, Patrick J. (2003). James. Collegeville, MN: Liturgical Press.
- Hays, Richard B. (1997). First Corinthians. Louisville, KY: John Knox Press.
- Hester, James (2020). Paul's Concept of Inheritance. Edinburgh: T&T Clark.
- Hiebert, D. Edmond (1992). James. Chicago, IL: Moody Press.
- Hodges, Zane C. (1989). Absolutely Free! A Biblical Reply to Lordship Salvation. Grand Rapids, MI: Zondervan.
- Hodges, Zane C. (2010). The Grace New Testament Commentary. Vol. 2. Denton, TX: Grace Evangelical Society.
- Hoehner, Harold (2002). Ephesians. Grand Rapids, MI: Baker Academic.
- Hofius, Otfried (1990). Exegetical Dictionary of the New Testament. Grand Rapids, MI: Eerdmans.
- Horton, Michael (2011). The Christian Faith: A Systematic Theology for Pilgrims on the Way. Grand Rapids, MI: Zondervan Academic.
- Horton, Stanley M. (29 October 1972). "Another Word Study From the Greek: Keep on Believing". Pentecostal Evangel.
- Hurtado, Larry W. (1989). Mark. Peabody, MA: Hendrickson.
- Jacobs, Henry Eyster, ed. (1911). The Book of Concord: Or the Symbolical Books of the Evangelical Lutheran Church. Vol. 1. Philadelphia, PA: United Lutheran Publication House.
- Jessop, Harry E. (1938). That Burning Question of Final Perseverance. Winona Lake, IN: Light and Life Press.
- John Paul II (1993). Catechism of the Catholic Church. Vatican City: Libreria Editrice Vaticana.
- Just, Arthur A. Jr. (1997). Luke 9:51-24:52. St. Louis, MO: Concordia Publishing House.
- Keathley, Kenneth D. (2010). Salvation and Sovereignty: A Molinist Approach. Nashville: B&H Publishing Group.
- Keener, Craig S. (2000). Revelation. NIV Application Commentary. Grand Rapids, MI: Zondervan.
- Keener, Craig S. (2019). Galatians. Grand Rapids, MI: Baker Academic.
- Kelly, J. N. D. (1963). A Commentary on the Pastoral Epistles. London: A. & C. Black.
- Knight, George W. (1992). The Pastoral Epistles. Grand Rapids, MI: Eerdmans.
- Koester, Craig R. (2014). Revelation. New Haven, CT: Yale University Press.
- Kretzmann, Paul E. (1921a). Popular Commentary of the Bible. Vol. 1. St. Louis, MO: Concordia Publishing House.
- Kretzmann, Paul E. (1921b). Popular Commentary of the Bible. Vol. 2. St. Louis, MO: Concordia Publishing House.
- Kuske, David P. (2001). A Commentary on 1 & 2 Peter, Jude. Milwaukee, WI: Northwestern Publishing House.
- Lampe, G. W. H. (1970). "Grievous wolves". Christ and Spirit in the New Testament. Cambridge: Cambridge University Press.
- Lane, William L. (1985). Hebrews: A Call to Commitment. Peabody, MA: Hendrickson.
- Lane, William L. (1991). Hebrews 1-8. Dallas, TX: Word Books.
- Larkin, William J. (1995). Acts. Downers Grove, IL: InterVarsity Press.
- Laws, Sophie (1980). A Commentary on the Epistle of James. San Francisco, CA: Harper & Row.
- Layman, Fred D. (1981). "Salvation in the Book of Revelation". An Inquiry into Soteriology From a Biblical Theological Perspective. ?: ?.
- Lee, Luther (1856). Elements of Theology: or an Exposition of the Divine Origin, Doctrines, Morals and Institutions of Christianity. New York, NY: Miller, Orton & Mulligan.
- Lenski, R. C. H. (1943). The Interpretation of St. John's Revelation. Columbus, OH: Wartburg Press.
- Lenski, R. C. H. (1946). The Interpretation of the Epistles of St. Peter, St. John and St. Jude. Columbus, OH: Wartburg Press.
- Levin, Amy-Jill (2018). The Gospel of Luke. Cambridge: Cambridge University Press.
- Lightfoot, Neil R. (2003). Jesus Christ Today: A Commentary on the Book of Hebrews. Grand Rapids, MI: Baker Books.
- Limborch, Philipp van (1702). A Complete System, or Body of Divinity. London: J. Taylor.
- Lockwood, Gregory J. (2000). 1 Corinthians. St. Louis, MO: Concordia Publishing House.
- Luthardt, Christoph E. (1878). St. John's Gospel. Vol. 3. Edinburgh: T. & T. Clark.
- Luther, Martin (1949). Commentary on the Epistle to the Galatians (1535). Translated by Theodore Graebner. Grand Rapids, MI: Zondervan.
- Luz, Ulrich (2001). Matthew 8-20. Minneapolis, MN: Augsburg Fortress.
- Lyons, George (2012). Galatians: A Commentary in the Wesleyan Tradition. Kansas City, MO: Beacon Hill Press.
- Mackie, Scott D. (2012). "Early Christian Eschatological Experience in the Warnings and Exhortations of the Epistle to the Hebrews". Tyndale Bulletin. 63 (1): 91–110.
- Marshall, I. Howard (1974). Kept by the Power of God: A Study of Perseverance and Falling Away. Minneapolis, MN: Bethany Fellowship.
- Martin, Ralph P. (1988). James. Waco, TX: Word Books.
- Mbuvi, Andrew M. (2015). Jude and 2 Peter. Grand Rapids, MI: Zondervan.
- McCartney, Dan G. (2009). James. Grand Rapids, MI: Baker Academic.
- McKnight, Scot (2005). "Apostasy". Dictionary of Theological Interpretation of the Bible. Grand Rapids, MI: Baker Academic.
- McKnight, Scot (2011). The Letter of James. Grand Rapids, MI: Eerdmans.
- McKnight, Scot (2013). A Long Faithfulness: The Case for Christian Perseverance. Nottingham, UK: Apollos.
- Melanchthon, Philip (1995). Annotations on the First Epistle to the Corinthians. Translated by John Patrick Donnelly. Milwaukee, WI: Marquette University Press.
- Melanchthon, Philip (2010). Commentary on Romans. Translated by Fred Kramer. St. Louis, MO: Concordia Publishing House.
- Mennonite Church (1921). Christian Fundamentals. Scottdale, PA: Mennonite General Conference.
- Michaels, J. Ramsey (2009). Hebrews. Cornerstone Biblical Commentary. Carol Stream, IL: Tyndale House.
- Miley, John (1894). Systematic Theology. Vol. 2. New York, NY: Hunt & Eaton.
- Milligan, Robert (1875). The Epistle to the Hebrews. Cincinnati, OH: Central Book Concern.
- Missionary Church (2011). "The Assurance of the Believer" (PDF). Missionary Church USA.
- Moo, Douglas J. (2000). The Letter of James. Grand Rapids, MI: Eerdmans.
- Moody, Dale (1990). Apostasy: A Study in the Epistle to the Hebrews and in Baptist History. Greenville, SC: Smyth & Helwys.
- Mounce, Robert H. (1997). The Book of Revelation. Grand Rapids, MI: Eerdmans.
- Mounce, William D. (1993). Basics of Biblical Greek Grammar. Grand Rapids, MI: Zondervan.
- Mounce, William D. (2000). Pastoral Epistles. Nashville, TN: Thomas Nelson.
- Mounce, William D. (2006). Mounce's Complete Expository Dictionary of Old & New Testament Words. Grand Rapids, MI: Zondervan.
- Muller, Richard A. (1985). Dictionary of Greek and Latin Theological Terms. Grand Rapids, MI: Baker Book House.
- Muller, Ruth (1997). "Perseverance". Dictionary of the Later New Testament and its Developments. Downers Grove, IL: InterVarsity Press.
- NAFWB (2013). A Treatise of the Faith and Practices of the National Association of Free Will Baptists, Inc (PDF). Antioch, TN: NAFWB.
- Nighswander, Dan (2017). 1 Corinthians. Harrisonburg, VA: Herald Press.
- Nolland, John (1989). Luke 1-9:20. Dallas, TX: Word Books.
- Nystrom, David P. (1997). James. Grand Rapids, MI: Zondervan.
- Oakes, Peter (2015). Galatians. Grand Rapids, MI: Baker Academic.
- Oecumenius (2006). "Fragment on the Epistle to the Hebrews". Ancient Christian Commentary on Scripture: Hebrews. Downers Grove, IL: InterVarsity Press.
- Olsson, Birger (2013). A Commentary on the Letters of John. Pisa: Peeters.
- Oropeza, B. J. (2000). Paul and Apostasy: Eschatology, Perseverance, and Falling Away in the Corinthian Congregation. Tübingen: Mohr Siebeck.
- Oropeza, B. J. (2011). In the Footsteps of Judas and Other Defectors: The Gospels, Acts, and Johannine Letters. Eugene, OR: Cascade Books.
- Oropeza, B. J. (2012). Churches Under Siege of Persecution and Assimilation: The General Epistles and Revelation. Eugene, OR: Cascade Books.
- Oropeza, B. J. (2012a). Jews, Gentiles, and the Opponents of Paul. Eugene, OR: Cascade Books.
- Osborne, Grant R. (2002). Revelation. Grand Rapids, MI: Baker Academic.
- Osborne, Grant R. (2004). Romans. Downers Grove, IL: InterVarsity Press.
- Osborne, Grant R. (2010). Matthew. Grand Rapids, MI: Zondervan.
- Osborne, Grant R. (2012). James. Carol Stream, IL: Tyndale House.
- Osborne, Grant R. (2016). Revelation: Verse by Verse. Bellingham, WA: Lexham Press.
- Outlaw, Stanley (2005). Hebrews. Nashville, TN: Randall House.
- Owens, Jesse (23 June 2014). "Thomas Grantham's Christianismus Primitivus". Helwys Society Forum.
- Pawson, David (2021). Once Saved, Always Saved? A Study in Perseverance and Inheritance. London: Anchor Recordings.
- Pfürtner, Stephen (1964). Luther and Aquinas on Salvation. New York, NY: Sheed and Ward.
- Picirilli, Robert E. (1975). Romans. Nashville, TN: Randall House.
- Picirilli, Robert E. (1987). 1, 2 Corinthians. Nashville, TN: Randall House.
- Picirilli, Robert E. (1992). Ephesians. Nashville, TN: Randall House.
- Picirilli, Robert E. (2002). Grace, Faith, Free Will: Contrasting Views of Salvation. Nashville, TN: Randall House Publications.
- Picirilli, Robert E. (2003). Mark. Nashville, TN: Randall House.
- Pink, Arthur W. (1954). An Exposition of Hebrews. Grand Rapids, MI: Baker Book House.
- Pink, Arthur W. (2001). Eternal Security. Lafayette, IN: Sovereign Grace Publishers, Inc. ISBN 1589601955.
- Pink, Arthur W. (2009). Studies on Saving Faith. Zeeland, MI: Reformed church Publications.
- Pope, William Burt (1879). A Compendium of Christian Theology. Vol. 3. London: Wesleyan Conference Office.
- Pope, William Burt (1883). A Higher Catechism of Theology. London: T. Woolmer.
- Prigent, Pierre (2004). Commentary on the Apocalypse of St. John. Tübingen: Mohr Siebeck.
- Pugh, Philip (1871). Arminianism v. Hyper-Calvinism. London: Simpkin, Marshall, & Co.
- Pugh, Gwyn (2008). The Book of Revelation. St. Louis, MO: Concordia Publishing House.
- Purkiser, W. T. (1956). Security: The False and the True. Kansas City, MO: Beacon Hill Press.
- Ralston, Thomas N. (1851). Elements of Divinity: or, A Course of Lectures, Comprising a Clear and Concise View of the System of Theology as Taught in the Holy Scriptures. Louisville, KY: Morton & Griswold.
- Reasoner, Vic (2007). A Fundamental Wesleyan Commentary on 1-2 Peter. Evansville, IN: Fundamental Wesleyan Publishers.
- Reasoner, Vic (2012). A Fundamental Wesleyan Commentary on Revelation. Evansville, IN: Fundamental Wesleyan Publishers.
- Reddish, Mitchell G. (2001). Revelation. Macon, GA: Smyth & Helwys.
- Renn, Stephen D. (2005). Expository Dictionary of Bible Words. Peabody, MA: Hendrickson.
- Richardson, Alan (1969). The Dictionary of Christian Theology. Philadelphia, PA: Westminster Press.
- Roberts, B. T. (1882). "To Perdition". The Earnest Christian. 43 (2). Rochester, NY: Earnest Christian Publishing House: 37–39.
- Roberts, B. T. (1885). "Kept from Falling". The Earnest Christian. 50 (6). Rochester, NY: Earnest Christian Publishing House: 165–168.
- Roberts, B. T. (1893). Holiness Teachings: The Life and Works of B.T. Roberts. North Chili, NY: Earnest Christian Publishing House.
- Robertson, A. T. (1933). Word Pictures in the New Testament. Vol. 6. Nashville, TN: Broadman Press.
- Robertson, Gregory (2005). "Eternal Security: A Biblical and Theological Appraisal" (PDF). Anderson University School of Theology.
- Robinson, Edward (1850). A Greek and English Lexicon of the New Testament. New York, NY: Harper & Brothers.
- Salvation Army (2010). The Salvation Army Handbook of Doctrine. London: Salvation Books.
- Scaer, David P. (1983). James the Apostle of Faith. St. Louis, MO: Concordia Publishing House.
- Schenck, Kenneth (2003). Understanding the Book of Hebrews. Louisville, KY: Westminster John Knox Press.
- Schnabel, Eckhard J. (2015). NIV Zondervan Study Bible. Grand Rapids, MI: Zondervan.
- Schreiner, Thomas R. (2001). The Race Set Before Us. Downers Grove, IL: InterVarsity Press.
- Schreiner, Thomas R. (2003). 1, 2 Peter, Jude. Nashville, TN: Broadman & Holman.
- Schreiner, Thomas R. (2015). Hebrews. Nashville, TN: Holman Reference.
- Schreiner, Thomas R. (2018). 1 Corinthians. Downers Grove, IL: InterVarsity Press.
- Schreiner, Thomas R. (2018a). Revelation. Wheaton, IL: Crossway.
- Scott, Leland (1974). "Perseverance, Final". In Harmon, Nolan B. (ed.). Encyclopedia of World Methodism. Vol. 2. Nashville, TN: The United Methodist Publishing House. pp. 1888–1889.
- Serrao, C. Jeanne Orjala (2010). James. Kansas City, MO: Beacon Hill Press.
- Shank, Robert (1989). Life in the Son: A Study of the Doctrine of Perseverance. Minneapolis, MN: Bethany House.
- Simpson, E. K. (1970). The Pastoral Epistles. Grand Rapids, MI: Eerdmans.
- Simpson, Matthew (1882). Cyclopaedia of Methodism. Philadelphia, PA: Louis H. Everts.
- Sloyan, Gerard S. (2004). Walking in the Truth: Perseveres and Deserters. Collegeville, MN: Liturgical Press.
- Smalley, Stephen S. (1994). The Revelation to John. Downers Grove, IL: InterVarsity Press.
- Spano, Eric (2018). Erasure and Endurance: Aspects of Soteriology in Revelation. London: T&T Clark.
- Spicq, Ceslas (1994). Theological Lexicon of the New Testament. Vol. 1. Peabody, MA: Hendrickson.
- Stamps, Donald (2003). Life in the Spirit Study Bible. Grand Rapids, MI: Zondervan.
- Stanglin, Keith D. (2009). "Arminius and Arminianism: An Overview". In Van Lieburg, Fred (ed.). Arminius, Arminianism, and Europe: Jacobus Arminius (1559/60-1609). Leiden: Brill. pp. 11–26.
- Stanglin, Keith D.; McCall, Thomas H. (15 November 2012). Jacob Arminius: Theologian of Grace. New York, NY: Oxford University Press USA.
- Stanley, Charles (1990). Eternal Security: Can You Be Sure?. Nashville, TN: Oliver-Nelson Books.
- Stauffer, J. L. (1933). The Eternal Security Teaching (2nd rev. ed.). Harrisburg, PA: Tract Press.
- Steele, Daniel (1878). Mile-Stone Papers: Doctrinal, Ethical, and Experimental on Christian Progress. New York: Nelson and Phillips.
- Steele, Daniel (1887). Antinomianism Revived or the Theology of the So-Called Plymouth Brethren Examined and Refuted. Boston: McDonald, Gill & Co.
- Steele, Daniel (1912). Steele's Answers. Chicago: Christian Witness Co.
- Stefanovic, Ranko (2002). Revelation of Jesus Christ: Commentary on the Book of Revelation. Berrien Springs, MI: Andrews University Press.
- Stein, Robert H. (2001). Mark. Grand Rapids, MI: Baker Academic.
- Stewart, Alexander (2015). Soteriology as Motivation in the Apocalypse of John. Piscataway, NJ: Gorgias Press.
- Stokes, Mark B. (1990). Major United Methodist Beliefs. Nashville, TN: Abingdon Press.
- Stott, John R. W. (1979). Ephesians. Downers Grove, IL: InterVarsity Press.
- Strauss, James D. (1992). The Seer, The Savior, and The Saved. Joplin, MO: College Press.
- Streett, Daniel R. (2011). They Went Out From Us: The Identity of the Opponents in First John. Berlin: De Gruyter.
- Strong, James (2001). Expanded Edition Strong's Complete Word Study Concordance. Chattanooga, TN: AMG Publishers.
- Summers, Thomas O. (1888). Systematic Theology: A Complete Body of Wesleyan Arminian Divinity. Vol. 2. Nashville, TN: Methodist Episcopal Church, South.
- Tappert, Theodore G. (1959). The Book of Concord: The Confessions of the Evangelical Lutheran Church. Philadelphia, PA: Fortress Press.
- Thayer, Joseph H. (1889). A Greek-English Lexicon of the New Testament. New York, NY: Harper & Brothers.
- Thomas, John Christopher (2016). Revelation. Grand Rapids, MI: Eerdmans.
- Thompson, James (2008). Hebrews (Paideia: Commentaries on the New Testament). Grand Rapids, MI: Baker Academic.
- Thornton, Thomas C. (1837). Theological Colloquies. Baltimore: Lewis and Coleman.
- Tolle, James M. (1969). Notes on 1 and 2 Peter. San Fernando, CA: Tolle Publications.
- Trebilco, Paul; Rae, Simon (2006). 1 Timothy. Manila: Asia Theological Association.
- Turner, George A.; Mantey, Julius R. (1964). The Gospel According to John. The Evangelical Commentary. Grand Rapids, MI: Eerdmans.
- Wakefield, Samuel (1869). A Complete System of Christian Theology: or a Concise, Comprehensive, and Systematic View of the Evidences, Doctrines, Morals, and Institutions of Christianity. Cincinnati: Hitchcock and Walden.
- Wall, Robert W. (1991). Revelation. Peabody, MA: Hendrickson.
- Wall, Robert W. (1993). Colossians & Philemon. Downers Grove, IL: InterVarsity Press.
- Wallace, Daniel B. (1996). Greek Grammar Beyond the Basics. Grand Rapids, MI: Zondervan.
- Weaver, Dorothy Jean (1990). Matthew's Missionary Discourse. Sheffield: JSOT Press.
- Wenger, John Christian (1954). Introduction to Theology: A Brief Introduction to the Doctrinal Content of Scripture Written in the Anabaptist-Mennonite Tradition. Scottdale, PA: Herald Press.
- Wesley, John (1872). The Works of John Wesley. Grand Rapids, MI: Zondervan.
- Whitby, Daniel (1710). A Discourse on the Five Points. London: A. and J. Churchill.
- Williams, John Rodman (1996). Renewal Theology: Systematic Theology from a Charismatic Perspective. Harper Collins. ISBN 978-0-310-20914-0.
- Williamson, Peter S. (2015). Revelation. Grand Rapids, MI: Baker Academic.
- Willis, Wendell (1985). Idol Meat in Corinth. Chico, CA: Scholars Press.
- Wilson, Andrew (2007). The Warning-Assurance Relationship in 1 Corinthians. Tübingen: Mohr Siebeck.
- Winger, Thomas M. (2015). Ephesians. St. Louis, MO: Concordia Publishing House.
- Witherington, Ben (1995). John's Wisdom: A Commentary on the Fourth Gospel. Louisville, KY: Westminster John Knox Press.
- Witherington, Ben (1995a). Conflict and Community in Corinth. Grand Rapids, MI: Eerdmans.
- Witherington, Ben (1998). Grace in Galatia. Grand Rapids, MI: Eerdmans.
- Witherington, Ben (2003). Revelation. Cambridge: Cambridge University Press.
- Witherington, Ben (2006). Matthew. Macon, GA: Smyth & Helwys.
- Witherington, Ben (2007). Letters and Homilies for Jewish Christians. Downers Grove, IL: InterVarsity Press.
- Witherington, Ben (2009). The Indelible Image. Vol. 1. Downers Grove, IL: InterVarsity Press.
- Witherington, Ben (2010). The Indelible Image. Vol. 2. Downers Grove, IL: InterVarsity Press.
- Witzki, Steve (2010a). "The Orthodox Church Affirms Conditional Security" (PDF). Society of Evangelical Arminians.
- Witzki, Steve (2010b). "The Arminian Confession of 1621 and Apostasy". Society of Evangelical Arminians.
- Womock, Laurence (1638). The Examination of Tilenus Before the Triers. London: ?.
- Womock, Laurence (1659). The Calvinists Cabinet Unlock'd. London: Richard Royston.
- Yrigoyen, Charles Jr. (2001). Belief Matters: United Methodism's Doctrinal Standards. Nashville, TN: Abingdon Press.
- Zerwick, Maximillian (1963). Biblical Greek. Rome: Scripta Pontificii Instituti Biblici.
