= Claudius B. Spencer =

American pastor and editor

Claudius B. Spencer (born 1856 in Michigan, died 14 July 1934) was a pastor of the Methodist Episcopal Church and an editor of Christian publications.

Spencer attended Northwestern University and Garrett Seminary, and served as a pastor of the Methodist Episcopal Church in the Detroit Conference from 1881 to 1892. He was then transferred to the Colorado Conference, where he was appointed editor of the Rocky Mountain Christian Advocate. When that publication merged with the Central Christian Advocate, Spencer moved to Kansas City, Missouri, to assume the editorship of that publication. He served in that capacity until his death in 1934.

Spencer served on many denominational boards and conferences. He received an honorary Doctor of Divinity degree from Lawrence University in 1896. As eulogized by University of Denver Chancellor Frederick M. Hunter, he "generated a spirit of enthusiasm and optimism because of what he himself was, as well as because of what he did and said." After a short illness, Spencer died on July 14, 1934.

The Claudius B. Spencer Papers at the University of Denver include articles from newspapers and magazines concerning Mormonism and the Methodist response to the Church of Jesus Christ of Latter-day Saints (LDS Church).

Also included are letters written to Spencer in his capacity as editor of the Central Christian Advocate. Many of these letters concern Mormonism, but there are also letters regarding controversies within the Methodist church and other church matters. Half of the collection is typescript pages and handwritten notes from a manuscript titled Holiness and Mormonism. The author of the manuscript is unknown. The manuscript describes the origins of Mormonism and, through lengthy discussion, refutes the legitimacy of the LDS Church.
