= Early American Methodist newspapers =

Newspapers and news magazines have always been an important source of information for Methodist churches and their members and constituents. In the US, there have been a variety of instruments published over the years, some by General Conferences, others by annual conferences, others by individuals.

These are some of the early papers published by various Methodist denominations.

- The Christian Advocate was the first paper published weekly under the authority of the General Conference of the Methodist Episcopal Church. It was commenced in New York City, 9 September 1826. It continued publication for many years as the first official and leading paper of the ME denomination.
- Zion's Herald, published in Boston, actually preceded The Christian Advocate, but was not officially owned by the General Conference. It was later merged with The Missionary Journal. Later, Methodists in New England re-established Zion's Herald as a separate publication.
- The Missionary Journal, published in Charleston, was another publication which preceded The Christian Advocate. Neither, however, was owned by the General Conference.
- The Christian Advocate and Journal and Zion's Herald was a merger of The Christian Advocate with the earlier Zion's Herald and The Missionary Journal.
- The Western Christian Advocate was another early publication of the ME General Conference. It was published in Cincinnati especially to serve the needs of the Methodist Church as it spread westward with the frontier.
- The Christian Recorder was the title of an early official periodical of the African Methodist Episcopal Church, begun in 1863. It was published in Philadelphia.
- The Ladies' Repository was the monthly magazine founded in 1841 by Cincinnati Methodists.
- The Nashville Christian Advocate was a weekly newspaper, founded in 1836, that served as the official organ and preeminent weekly of the Methodist Episcopal Church, South.
