= Oscar Penn Fitzgerald =

American politician

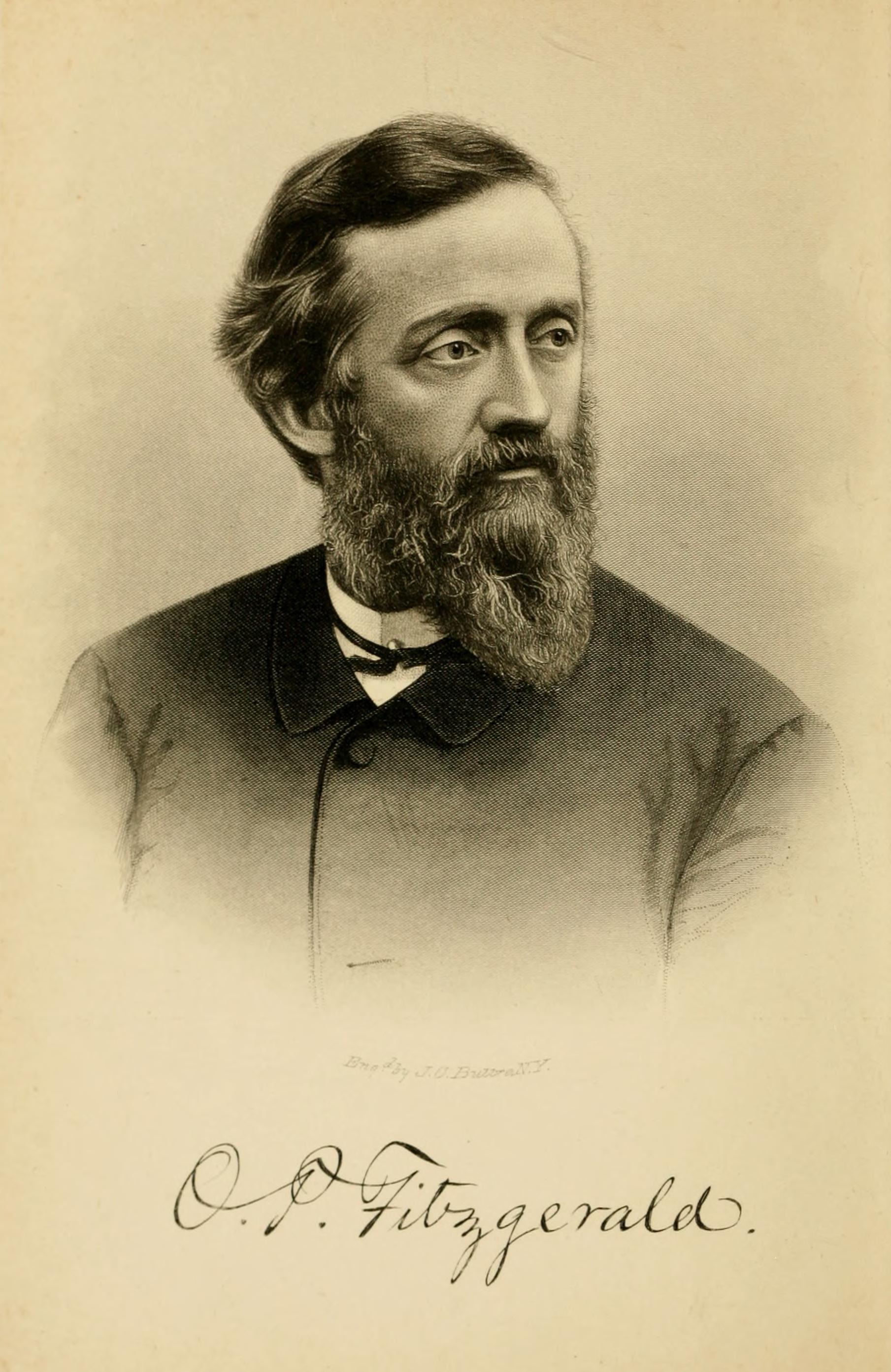

5th California State Superintendent of Public Instruction
- In office December 2, 1867 – December 4, 1871
- Governor: Frederick Low; Henry H. Haight
- Preceded by: John Swett
- Succeeded by: Henry N. Bolander

Personal details
- Born: August 24, 1829 Caswell County, North Carolina
- Died: 1911
- Party: Democratic
- Spouse: Sarah Banks
- Profession: Clergy

Oscar Penn Fitzgerald (August 24, 1829 – August 5, 1911) was a Methodist clergyman, journalist and educator. He served as California Superintendent of Public Instruction (1867–1871) and was elected a Bishop of the Methodist Episcopal Church, South in 1890.

== Birth and family ==
He was born August 24, 1829, in Caswell County, North Carolina, near Ruffin, the son of Richard and Martha Jones Hooper Fitzgerald. Fitzgerald was of an old Virginia family, of Nottoway County, where many relatives lived respectably. In 1855 he married Sarah Banks of Georgia.

== Education ==
His early education was such as could be obtained in the average country schools of that time. His first real educational opportunity came at the Oak Grove Academy in Rockingham County, North Carolina. His teacher, Booker Doss, was a rigid disciplinarian, though his instruction was thorough.

== Early journalism experience ==
When Fitzgerald was thirteen he went to Lynchburg, Virginia, to work for the Lynchburg Republican, following an irresistible bent. There his deep aptitude for journalism was confirmed. By the age of twenty he had already acquired a local reputation as a writer. When his father enlisted during the Mexican–American War, Fitzgerald was forced to return home to help support his mother. He taught in a country school in Rockingham County for a time. Meanwhile, being an earnest student, he continued writing for the press, becoming connected with the Richmond Examiner shortly thereafter. Upon his father's return, Fitzgerald continued working in newspaper offices in Richmond, Virginia, Columbia, South Carolina, and Macon, Georgia (removing from Virginia to Georgia for the sake of the climate at the age of twenty-one). At Macon he also assisted in the preparation of the school history of the United States and other textbooks. He was on the eve of taking the editorship of a journal when in 1853 a great change in his plans took place and he entered the ministry of the M.E. Church, South.

== Ordained ministry and missionary service ==
He entered the Traveling Ministry of the Georgia Annual Conference, appointed to Andrews Chapel in Savannah. In 1855, he and his wife left for California on a missionary assignment. They spent the first two years in Sonora, Tuolumne County. From there they went to San Jose, then to San Francisco, where he became the Editor of the Pacific Methodist (the official paper of the M.E. Church, South in the region) and of the Christian Spectator (the two papers subsequently merged).

== Educational and elected service ==
In 1867, Fitzgerald was elected Superintendent of Public Instruction of the State of California, serving in this position for four years. During his administration he was instrumental in the establishment of an institution that has since become the University of California, Berkeley. The State Normal School was permanently located and equipped at this time, as well. Various reforms were made in California education and great advancement was realized in the same. During this period, Fitzgerald also offered himself for the Democratic nomination for the U.S. Senate. He was also a Regent of the University of California for four years, and the Chairman of the Committee on Instruction.

Fitzgerald also filled the Chair of Homiletics in the Pacific Methodist College, and was for a time the President of that institution. In 1867, Fitzgerald was originator and treasurer of a movement in California for the relief of sufferers in the South following the American Civil War. Nearly $100,000 in gold was raised and forwarded to the relief committees of the several Southern States.

== Resumed journalistic career ==
In 1878, Fitzgerald went to the headquarters of the (Southern) Methodist Publishing House in Nashville, Tennessee, to become editor of the Nashville Christian Advocate, the official periodical of the Southern Church, with over 25,000 subscribers. He also edited and published Fitzgerald's Home Newspaper and Educational Journal.

== Episcopal ministry ==
After twelve years in his present editorship, Fitzgerald was elected a Bishop of the M.E. Church, South. He presided over Annual Conferences from Maryland to California.

== Selected writings ==
- John B. McFerrin: A Biography (1888)
- Judge Longstreet: A Life-Sketch (1891)
- Landon Cabell Garland, LL.D. (1896)
- Lovick Pierce, D.D. (1896)
- Whetstone: The Day and the Word (1897)
- California Sketches (1912)

== See also ==
- List of bishops of the United Methodist Church
