= Thomas Osmond Summers =

American theologian (1812–1882)

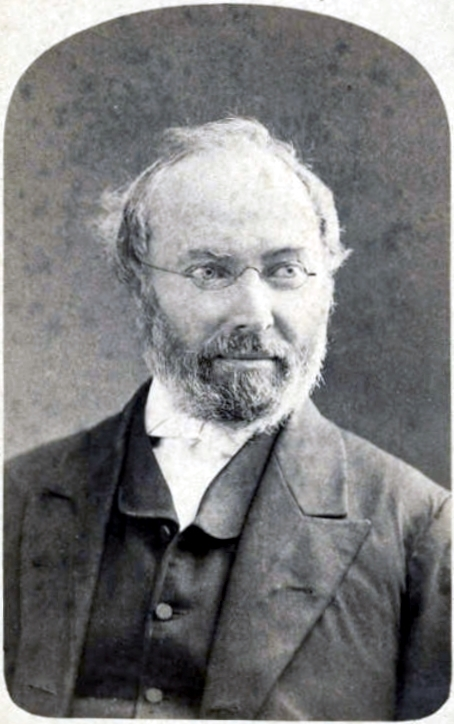
- Born: 11 October 1812
- Died: 6 May 1882
- Occupations: Minister, theologian, liturgist, university teacher, editor
- Employer: Vanderbilt University
- Awards: Doctor of Divinity (1847, Emory University); Doctor of Law (honorary)

Thomas Osmond (or Osgood) Summers (11 October 1812 – 6 May 1882) was an English-born American Methodist theologian, clergyman, hymnist, editor, liturgist and university professor. He is considered one of the most prominent Methodist theologians of the nineteenth century.

== Biography ==
=== Early life ===
Thomas Osmond Summers was born the 11 October 1812 in Swanage, Dorset, England. Summers was orphaned at six year old and cared for by his Calvinist grandmother His only sister also died around this time. At age seven, along with his brother, he moved under the care of a great aunt named Sarah Havilland, who had a lasting influence on him. She taught Summers in the doctrine and the practices of the Congregational church, until she died in 1828. Following her death, he was placed in the guardianship of three deacons of the Independent Church who taught him the catechism, selected Bible passages for memorizing, and saw that he attended church five times each Sunday, and at mid-week services. In 1830, he emigrated to the United States. In 1832, he joined Ebenezer Methodist Episcopal Church in Washington, D.C. In 1833, he had a conversion experience. In 1834, he was licensed to preach, and admitted as a member on trial to the Baltimore Conference.

=== Career ===
In 1835, Summers was appointed to the Augusta circuit in rural Virginia. He gained a reputation on the circuit as the preeminent experts in hymnody. In 1837, He was ordained deacon in 1837 and was appointed to the Baltimore City station church. In 1839, he was ordained elder and appointed to the West River Circuit in Texas. In 1840, he established a Methodist community on Galveston Island in Texas. In 1844, he moved to the Alabama Conference, and married Miss N. B. Sexton. He also served as a Methodist clergyman in Mississippi.

In 1845, Summers was elected secretary of the Methodist Episcopal Church. He was selected to chair the committee tasked with creating a new hymnal for the Methodist Episcopal Church, South. He was chosen as the assistant editor of the Southern Christian Advocate, Charleston, South Carolina. In 1847, Summers was conferred an honorary D.D. degree by Emory College.

In 1850, he moved to Nashville, Tennessee and worked as a book editor for the Methodist Episcopal Church, South. From 1851 to 1856, he served as the editor of the Sunday School Visitor. In 1855, he relocated to Nashville, as general editor of the Southern Christian Advocate and also supervising all of the Methodist Episcopal Church, South's Sunday School publications. From 1858 to 1861, he served as editor of the Quarterly Review of the Methodist Church, South. From 1868 to 1878, he was the editor of the Nashville Christian Advocate.

Summers published over 500 books from church history to medicine. However, the actual number is difficult to determine because he often did not indicate his own authorship. In addition to his honorary D.D. degree from Emory, Summers also received an honorary LL.D. degree for his work.

In 1875, Summers served as Professor of Systematic Theology at Vanderbilt University, a newly established university in Nashville which was started as a Methodist institution by Holland Nimmons McTyeire (1824-1889), Bishop of the Methodist Episcopal Church, South. By 1878, he became Dean of the Biblical Department at Vanderbilt University, later known as the Vanderbilt University Divinity School. He became known as "one of the leading Methodist theologians of the nineteenth century."

=== Theology and views ===
In 1856, a few years before the American Civil War of 1861-1865, and together with William Andrew Smith (1802–1870), the President of his alma mater Randolph–Macon College, he published an essay about domestic slavery in the United States. Later, in The Ladies' Repository, he justified punishment of the sinful as tough love. Throughout the Civil War, Summers continued to publish materials for Confederate soldiers, lamenting once that his poor eyesight prevented him from serving in the Confederate army.

Summers was a systematic theologian in the Wesleyan tradition. His views on soteriology are representative of classical Arminianism.

=== Death ===
Summers died after collapsing during a meeting of General Conference on the 6th of May,1882 in Nashville, Tennessee. He is buried in the Bishop’s Grave (also known as Bishop’s Monument) on Vanderbilt’s campus alongside Bishop Joshua Soule, Bishop William McKendree, Bishop Holland Nimmons McTyeire, his wife Amelia, and Chancellor Landon Garland.

== Works ==
=== Books ===
- Summers, Thomas O. (1850). Christian patriotism (Sermon). Charleston, SC: Printed by C. Canning.
- Summers, Thomas O. (1851). Holiness a treatise on sanctification, as set forth in the New Testament. Richmond, Louisville: J. Early, for the Methodist Episcopal church, South.
- Summers, Thomas O. (1891) [1852]. Baptism : a treatise on the nature, perpetuity, subjects, administrator, mode, and use of the initiating ordinance of the Christian Church [...] (PDF). Nashville, TN: Southern Methodist Publishing House.
- Summers, Thomas O. (1858). The preachers' text-book. Nashville, TN: Southern Methodist Publishing House.
- Summers, Thomas O. (1859). The golden censer : an essay on prayer, with a selection of forms of prayer, designed to aid in the devotions of the sanctuary, family, and closet (PDF). Nashville, TN: Southern Methodist Publishing House.
- Summers, Thomas O. (1864). The Gospel message. Richmond: Macfarlane & Fergusson.
- Summers, Thomas O. (1869). Commentary on the gospels (PDF). Vol. 1, St. Matthew. Nashville, TN: Southern Methodist Publishing House.
- Summers, Thomas O. (1872). Commentary on the gospels (PDF). Vol. 2, St. Mark. Nashville, TN: Southern Methodist Publishing House.
- Summers, Thomas O. (1872). Commentary on the gospels (PDF). Vol. 3, St. Luke. Nashville, TN: Southern Methodist Publishing House.
- Summers, Thomas O. (1872). Commentary on the gospels (PDF). Vol. 4, St. John. Nashville, TN: Southern Methodist Publishing House.
- Summers, Thomas O. (1872). The way of salvation. Nashville, TN: Southern Methodist Publishing House.
- Summers, Thomas O. (1874). Commentary on the Acts of the Apostles (PDF). Nashville, TN: Southern Methodist Publishing House.
- Summers, Thomas O. (1881). The Epistle of Paul, the Apostle to the Romans (PDF). Nashville, TN: Southern Methodist Publishing House.
- Summers, Thomas O. (1888). Systematic Theology: A Complete Body of Wesleyan Arminian Divinity (PDF). Vol. 1. Nashville, TN: Southern Methodist Publishing House.
- Summers, Thomas O. (1888). Systematic Theology: A Complete Body of Wesleyan Arminian Divinity (PDF). Vol. 2. Nashville, TN: Southern Methodist Publishing House.

=== Edited by ===
[Summers' edited books are numerous. Here is only a selection]

- Summers, Thomas O. (1851). Songs of Zion : a supplement to the hymn book of the Methodist Episcopal Church, South. Richmond, Louisville: Southern Methodist Publishing House.
- Smith, William Andrew; Summers, Thomas O.; Americana, Sabin (1856). Lectures On the Philosophy and Practice of Slavery, As Exhibited in the Institution of Domestic Slavery in the United States: With the Duties of Masters of Slaves. Nashville, TN: Southern Methodist Publishing House.
- Summers, Thomas O. (1857). Methodist pamphlets for the people. Nashville, TN: Southern Methodist Publishing House.
- Summers, Thomas O. (1858). Biographical sketches of eminent itinerant ministers distinguished, for the most part, as pioneers of Methodism within the bounds of the Methodist Episcopal Church, South. Nashville, TN: Southern Methodist Publishing House.
- Summers, Thomas O. (1860). Catechisms of the Methodist Episcopal Church, South. Nashville, TN: Southern Methodist Publishing House.
- Summers, Thomas O. (1873). Commentary on the ritual of the Methodist Episcopal Church, South. Nashville, TN: Southern Methodist Publishing House.
- Summers, Thomas O. (1881). Sermons by Southern Methodist preachers. Nashville, TN: Southern Methodist Publishing House.

== Notes and references ==
=== Sources ===
- CDH (2020). "Thomas O. Summers". The Canterbury Dictionary of Hymnology. Canterbury Press.
- Fornell, Earl Wesley (2011). The Galveston Era: The Texas Crescent on the Eve of Secession. Austin, TX: University of Texas Press. p. 83. ISBN 9780292789197.
- Hannan, Caryn (1998). Georgia Biographical Dictionary. St. Clair Shores, MI: State History Publications. p. 362. ISBN 9781878592422.
- Holder, Ray (1984). The Mississippi Methodists, 1799-1983: a moral people "born of conviction". Jackson, MS: Maverick Prints.
- Johnson, Andrew (1976). The Papers: 1822-1851. Knoxville, TN: University of Tennessee Press. pp. 320–321. ISBN 9780870492730.
- NCC (2013). "Removals from City Cemetery to Other Cemeteries" (PDF). The Nashville City Cemetery.
- Olson, Roger E. (2010). "Arminian teaching regarding original sin". Roger E. Olson: My evangelical, Arminian theological musings. Patheos.
- Phillips, L. Edward (1989). "Thomas Osmond Summers, Methodist Liturgist of the Nineteenth Century" (PDF). Methodist History. 27 (4).
- Ripley, George; Dana, Charles A. (1879). "Vanderbilt University" . The American Cyclopædia. Vol. XVI.
- SEU (2025). "Chronological Listing of Honorary Degree Recipients" (PDF). Secretary, Emory University. Atlanta, Georgia.
- Sigler, R. Matthew (2018). Methodist Worship: Mediating the Wesleyan Liturgical Heritage. London: Taylor & Francis. ISBN 9780429959929.
- Williams, Jeffrey (2010). Religion and Violence in Early American Methodism: Taking the Kingdom by Force. Bloomington, Indiana: Indiana University Press. p. 146. ISBN 978-0253004239.
- Wilson, James Grant; Fiske, John (1891). "Summers, Thomas Osmond". Appletons' Cyclopædia of American Biography. Vol. V. New York, New York: D. Appleton and Company. p. 744.
