= Christian Advocate =

Defunct publication in New York

- First issue: 1826; 200 years ago
- Final issue: 1973
- Company: United Methodist Publishing House
- Country: United States
- Language: English

The Christian Advocate was a weekly newspaper published in New York City by the Methodist Episcopal Church. It began publication in 1826 and by the mid-1830s had become the largest circulating weekly in the United States, with more than 30,000 subscribers and an estimated 150,000 readers. After changes of name and a split into two publications, publication ceased in 1975.

== Overview ==
The Methodist Book concern was authorized by the General Conference to publish The Christian Advocate for 147 years. Its publishing location would change as the Methodist Church expanded westward and the slavery issue divided the church in 1844. After the church united again, what had become a monthly magazine was finally edited in Chicago and printed in Nashville, Tennessee, in 1939. It was first a weekly broadsheet, and later a monthly magazine for Methodist families. In the intervening years, The Advocate name was part of the name of numerous Methodist journals published by local conferences and jurisdictions of the church.

== Proliferation ==
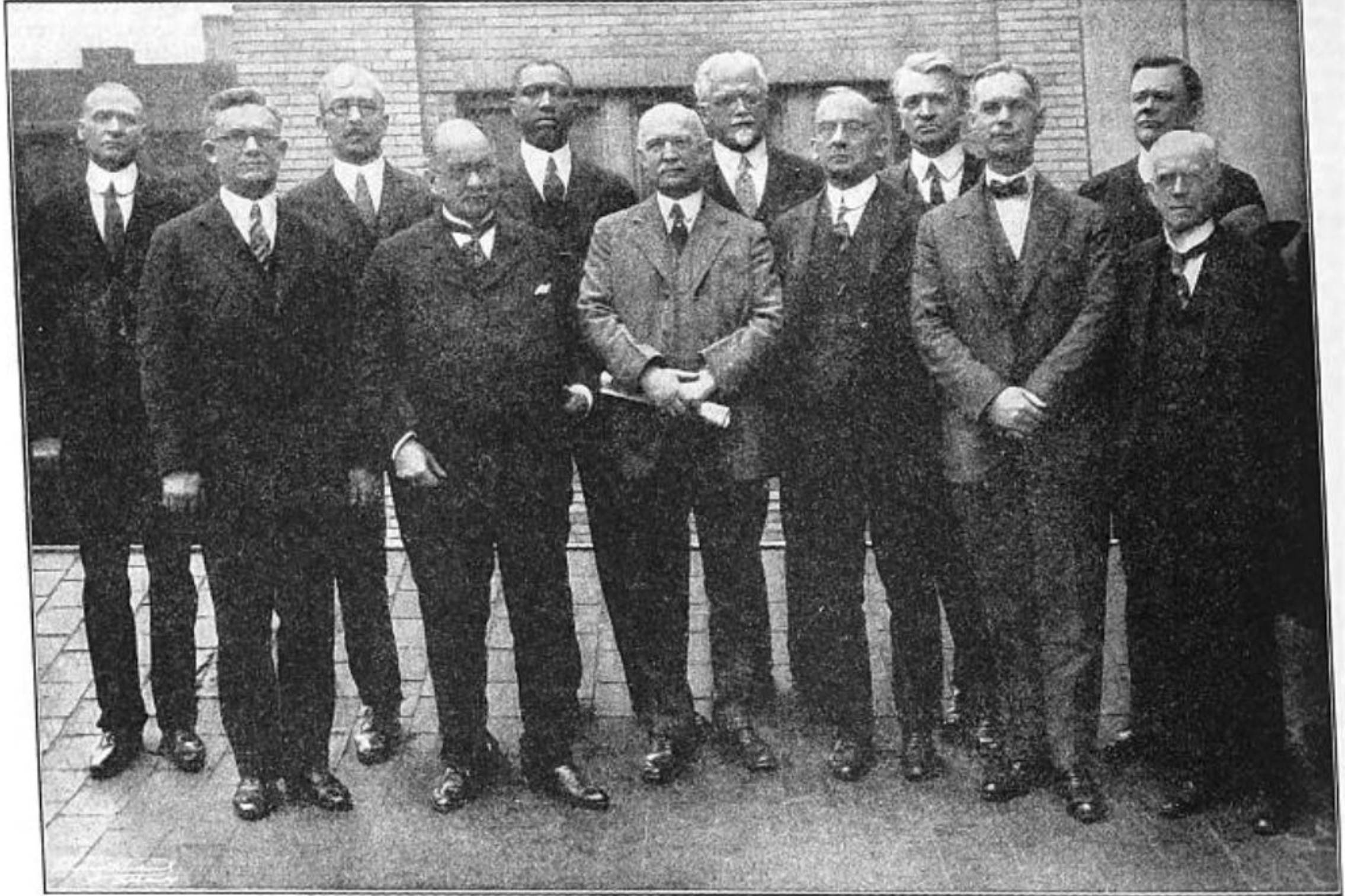
Editors of the official Advocates, 1926

The various Christian Advocates came into existence for reasons which could be appreciated only as the conditions of the time of their establishment were recalled. All of the Christian Advocates were established either before the advent of the railroad or at a time when the railroad had not brought the sections of the country together to anything like the extent which prevailed later. In the 1830s and 1840s, the Methodists of the Ohio Valley and westward could not be served by a newspaper published in New York City. If the churches of the territory were to have the stimulation and unifying influence of a Methodist Church paper, it had to be published in the midst of that territory.

When the number of Advocates was taken into account, there was also a tendency to consolidate some of them. Two non-official papers -the Omaha Christian Advocate and the Rocky Mountain Advocate- were combined with the Central Christian Advocate in 1900; the Northern Christian Advocate, after an existence of more than 60 years, was combined with the New York Christian Advocate in 1917.

In considering the history of the many different Advocates, a large part was played by The Methodist Book Concern. The existence and strength of the Book Concern made it possible to establish Church papers in different sections of the United States at a time when the local resources would not have permitted the establishment and self-support of the papers. Thus the Book Concern was able to strengthen the Church in the early years in a strategic way.

Eighteen years after the establishment of the Western Christian Advocate at Cincinnati, the Northwestern Christian Advocate was begun in Chicago. Its establishment was necessary to the development of the Church in the opening of the west and northwest country. The Central Christian Advocate was begun in 1856. It began its existence in the days which preceded the Civil War. It was located in the center of the turmoil and discussion on the border between North and South. This paper rendered service not only to the Church but to the anti-slavery movement as well. During the war, all of the Christian Advocates were influential agencies, making for the support of the Union cause and the abolition of slavery. The General Conference of 1860 saw to it that strong anti-slavery editors were elected.

In 1864, the circulation of the Western Christian Advocate was 33,787; that of the Northwestern Christian Advocate was 25,000; that of the Central Christian Advocate was 8,204. In 1856, the Pacific Christian Advocate, which had begun as an independent paper, was officially adopted by the General Conference. From 1880 to 1892, the paper was unofficial. Though the General Conference had withdrawn its support, it continued to be published. It served the special interest of the Conferences in the Pacific Northwest.

The Southwestern Christian Advocate was begun as an independent paper published in New Orleans in the interest of the African American work of the Church. It was taken over by the General Conference in 1876. It was widely known as one of the best representatives of African American journalism.

The Southeastern Christian Advocate was first published in Atlanta, Georgia and was adopted by the General Conference in 1868. After 1884, the paper was discontinued for a while and later resurrected and published in Athens, Tennessee. The name for many years was The Methodist Advocate Journal, which was changed to the later style in 1925.

Der Christliche Apologete was, since its establishment in 1839, a member in the family of Methodist Church papers. This paper was published in the interest of Methodists among the German people of the U.S. and also circulated to some extent in Germany. William Nast, the first editor, had one of the longest editorial careers in the history of the Church, being editor for 53 years, from 1839 to 1892. He was succeeded in 1892 by his son, A. J. Nast, who served until 1917.

== Area, Conference, and personal organs not owned by the General Conference ==
In addition to the Church papers under the control of the General Conference, there are three papers with different degrees of "non-officialism". The Pittsburgh Christian Advocate was established in 1833. It is controlled by a publishing committee from four adjoining Conferences, but the editors were elected by the General Conference.

Zion's Herald was a semi-official paper. It was not responsible to the General Conference but was devoted to the interests of Methodism, particularly in New England. It had a large and long history of influence. The first Zion's Herald was organized by a private association in New England in 1823 and was purchased by The Methodist Book Concern in 1828 and became part of The Christian Advocate, the new title being the Christian Advocate and Journal and Zion's Herald. In 1833, the name Zion's Herald was dropped from the title of The Christian Advocate and taken up by the Wesleyan Association in Boston and given to the New England Christian Herald. Dr. L. O. Hartman was its editor.

The Michigan Christian Advocate was started as a monthly by the Rev. Orrin Whitmore of Adrian, Michigan in 1873, and appeared as a weekly from Detroit since January 1875. The Methodist Publishing Company which owned it (1874-1919) turned it over to the joint ownership of the Detroit and Michigan Conferences. Among its editors were Joseph F. Berry, James H. Potts, and Dr. William H. Phelps. It circulated 19,000 copies.

== Later years ==
The last chapter of the Christian Advocate magazine was reported in Time magazine's Religion section (October 11, 1956):

The 1826 prospectus described the Christian Advocate as "an entertaining, instructive and profitable family visitor." This week, in one of the most ambitious ventures in the history of church publishing, the U.S. Methodist Church split the 130-year-old Christian Advocate into two visitors—one entertaining (Together) and one instructive. The instructive visitor is for ministers: a trim, digest-sized monthly called The New Christian Advocate, packed with 22 pithy articles under such headings as Church Administration, Architecture & Building, Pastor & Parsonage. Illustrations and features enliven the pages between pastoral shoptalk ranging from "Preaching on Controversial Issues" to "Psychiatry Needs Religion."

In 1959 editors of The New Christian Advocate changed the name back to The Christian Advocate and its format from pocket size to full size, with circulation bi-monthly. In 1973, due to declining circulation, the United Methodist Board of Publishing authorized the replacement of both magazines with a pocket-sized magazine entitled United Methodists Today. A supplement for pastors was published, Today's Ministry. Both magazines ended in 1975.

== In popular culture ==
The Christian Advocate featured in the third episode of the 2022 HBO series The Gilded Age, as an example of the prejudice black writers faced in the 1880s.

== Notable editors and writers ==
- Nathan Bangs
- James Monroe Buckley
- William Curnow
- John Price Durbin
- Charles Henry Fowler
- George Peck

== See also ==
- Early American Methodist newspapers
- Nashville Christian Advocate
- The Progressive Christian
- Wesleyan Christian Advocate
