= Nashville Christian Advocate =

19th-century Methodist newspaper in Tennessee, US

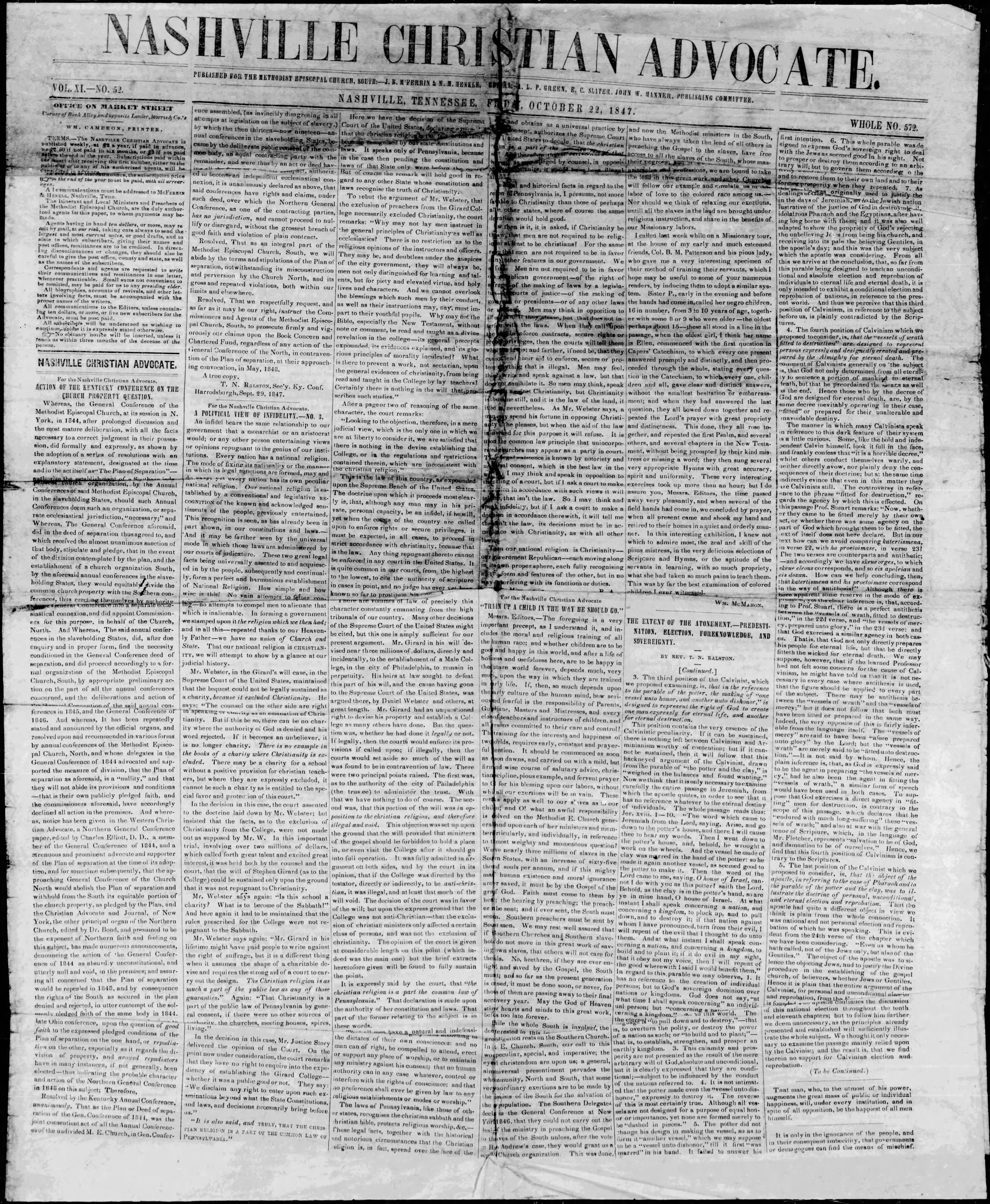
Front page of the Nashville Christian Advocate, a newspaper of the Methodist Episcopal Church, South, on October 22, 1847

The Nashville Christian Advocate was a weekly newspaper of the Methodist Episcopal Church, South. It served as the central organ of the denomination as well as the official paper of the Tennessee Conference. It was the largest and most influential of the Methodist newspapers in the South. It was founded under the name Southwestern Christian Advocate in 1836. and remained the "leading weekly" of the church after the Civil War. Prominent editors included Thomas Osgood Summers (1812-1882), Oscar Penn Fitzgerald and Elijah Embree Hoss. It continued until 1941.

== Sources ==
- Circuit Rider Dismounts: Social History of Southern Methodism, 1865-1900, by Hunter Dickinson Farish, 1938.
- Hands on the Ark: The Struggle For Change in the Methodist Episcopal Church, South, 1914-1939, by Robert Watson Sledge, 1975.
- The Sacred Flame of Love: Methodism and Society in Nineteenth Century Georgia, by Christopher H. Owen (University Press of Georgia, 1999).
- Rebuilding Zion: The Religious Reconstruction of the South, 1863-1877, by Daniel W. Stowell (Oxford University Press, 1998).
- God's Almost Chosen Peoples: A Religious History of the American Civil War, by George C. Rable (University of North Carolina Press, 2010).
