= Contingency =

Contingency or Contingent may refer to:

- Contingency (philosophy), in philosophy and logic
- Contingency plan, in planning
- Contingency (electrical grid), in electrical grid engineering
- Contingency table, in statistics
- Contingency theory, in organizational theory
- Contingency (evolutionary biology)
- Contingency management, in medicine
- Contingent claim, in finance
- Contingent fee, in commercial matters
- Contingent liability, in law
- Contingent vote, in politics
- Contingent work, an employment relationship
- Cost contingency, in business risk management
- "Contingency" (Prison Break), a television series episode
- Military contingent, a group within an army
- "Contingency Song", a song by Jane Remover

== See also ==
- Contractual term, upon which agreed outcomes are contingent
