= Treatise on Relics =

1543 theological book by John Calvin

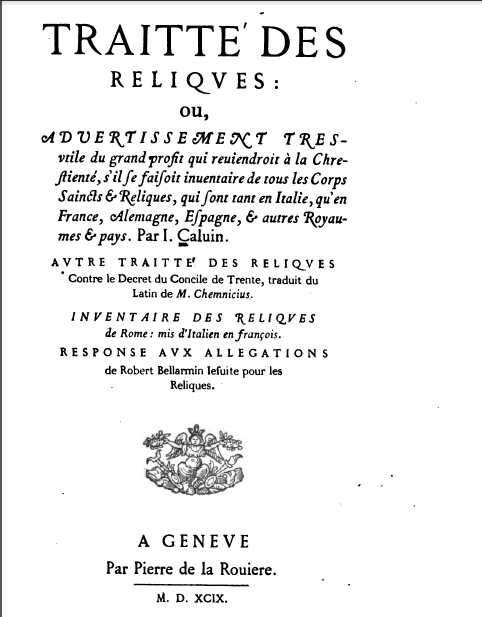
- Front page of the 1599 Geneva edition
- Author: John Calvin
- Original title: Traitté des reliques: ou, advertissement tres-utile du grand profit qui reviendrait a la chrestiente s'il se faisait inventaire de tous les corps saincts & reliques qui sont tant en Italie qu'en France, Alemagne, Espagne & autres royaumes & pays
- Translator: Stephen Wyther (1561), Henry Beveridge and M. M. Backus (1844), Valerian Krasinski (1854)
- Language: French
- Publisher: Pierre de la Rouiere
- Publication place: Switzerland
- Media type: Print

Treatise on Relics or Tract on Relics (French: Traitté des reliques) is a theological book by theologian John Calvin, written in 1543 in French about the authenticity of many Christian relics. Calvin harshly criticizes the relics' authenticity, and suggests the rejection of relic worship. The book was published in Geneva, and was included in the Index Librorum Prohibitorum.

== Background ==
The veneration of saints and their relics has its origins in early Christianity by means of honoring martyrs. The earliest attestion is Polycarp's martyrdom in 156 A.D. described in the 2nd century The Martyrdom of Polycarp, whose bones were called "more valuable than precious stones and finer than refined gold" by the Smyrnaean church and were kept to recall and celebrate the anniversary of his martyrdom. Widespread cults of saints began in cemeteries outside of Roman cities in the digging up, dismembering, and public display of the bodies of dead Christians; in turn, many of those places became centers of worship.

In the 4th century, veneration of relics in the west had become a "newly-formed" attitude towards the dead, distinct from pagan cultural norms of the deceased, found especially in Christian communities in Africa, Italy, Spain, and Gaul. Augustine of Hippo, for example, described these devotions to the martyrs as "signs of respect to their memory, not sacred rites or sacrifices to the dead as if to gods ... We do not, then, worship our martyrs with divine honors of human crimes as the Egyptian pagans worship their gods." The late antiquity belief in the significance of the saints was shaped by an understanding of their "deeply immanent presences" on earth. By the end of the 4th and 5th centuries, the cult of relics had grown to include secondary objects such as clothing. Relics were kept in churches, monasteries and royal houses, and were widely traded; the trade in relics increased after the Crusades. Even fake relics were richly decorated with gold, silver, and precious stones for display to pilgrims who considered them authentic. At the onset of the early Middle Ages, relic veneration had an "all-pervasive influence" in Latin Christendom that has "no parallel" to any other society.

By the mid-16th century, the number of relics was enormous and it was nearly impossible to determine a relic's authenticity. Guibert of Nogent's early 12th century On Saints and Their Relics (Latin: De sanctis et pigneribus eorum) was a critique of popular religion and the alleged relics in the Abbey of Saint-Médard de Soissons, a Benedictine monastery which was destroyed during the French Revolution. The Reformation criticized the veneration of saints and relics, and in 1543 Calvin published his Tract on Relics in response to Albert Pighius' 1542 "De libero hominis arbitrio et divina gratia libri X" (which opposed Calvin and Martin Luther).

== Contents ==
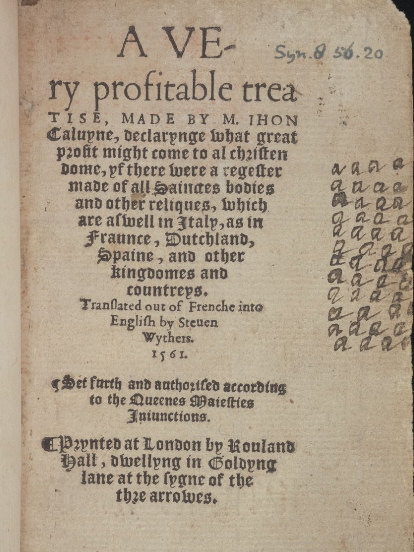
Front page of the first English translation, by Stephen Wythers (published in 1561 by Sir Rowland Hill)

Calvin described relics from 12 cities in Germany, three cities in Spain, 15 cities in Italy, and 30–40 cities in France. He asserted that fake relics had been traded since Augustine's lifetime, and had increased as the world inevitably became more corrupt. Calvin proposed to abandon the veneration of relics, citing God's hiding of Moses' burial place in the Old Testament book of Deuteronomy (34:6). According to Calvin, God hid Moses' body so the Jews would not fall into idolatry (which he equated with the veneration of relics).

Calvin listed in detail the falsified Christian relics known to him, which were kept in churches and monasteries. According to him, saints had two, three or more bodies with arms and legs; extra limbs and heads also existed. Calvin did not understand where the relics of the Biblical Magi, the Bethlehem babies, the stones which killed Stephen, the Ark of the Covenant, or Aaron's two rods (instead of one) came from. Objects of worship included Jesus' robe and a towel with which he wiped himself. The relics had several copies, in different places. Others included a piece of fish which Christ ate after the resurrection, Christ's footprint on a stone, and his tears. Cults of hair and the Milk of the Virgin were widespread. The combined quantity of Mary's milk was so great that, according to Calvin, only a cow could produce that much. Other objects of Marian worship were a very large shirt, two combs, a ring, and slippers. Relics associated with the Archangel Michael were a small sword and shield with which the disembodied Michael defeated the disembodied spirit of the Devil.

At the end of the treatise, Calvin warned the reader:

And so completely are they all mixed up and huddled together, that it is impossible to have the bones of any martyr without running the risk of worshipping the bones of some thief or robber, or, it may be, the bones of a dog, or a horse, or an ass. Nor can the Virgin Mary's ring, or comb, or girdle, be venerated without the risk of venerating some part of the dress of a strumpet. Let every one, therefore, who is inclined, guard against this risk. Henceforth no man will be able to excuse himself by pretending ignorance

— John Calvin (translated by Henry Beveridge, 1844), An Admonition showing, the Advantages which Christendom might derive from an Inventory of Relics

== Translations ==
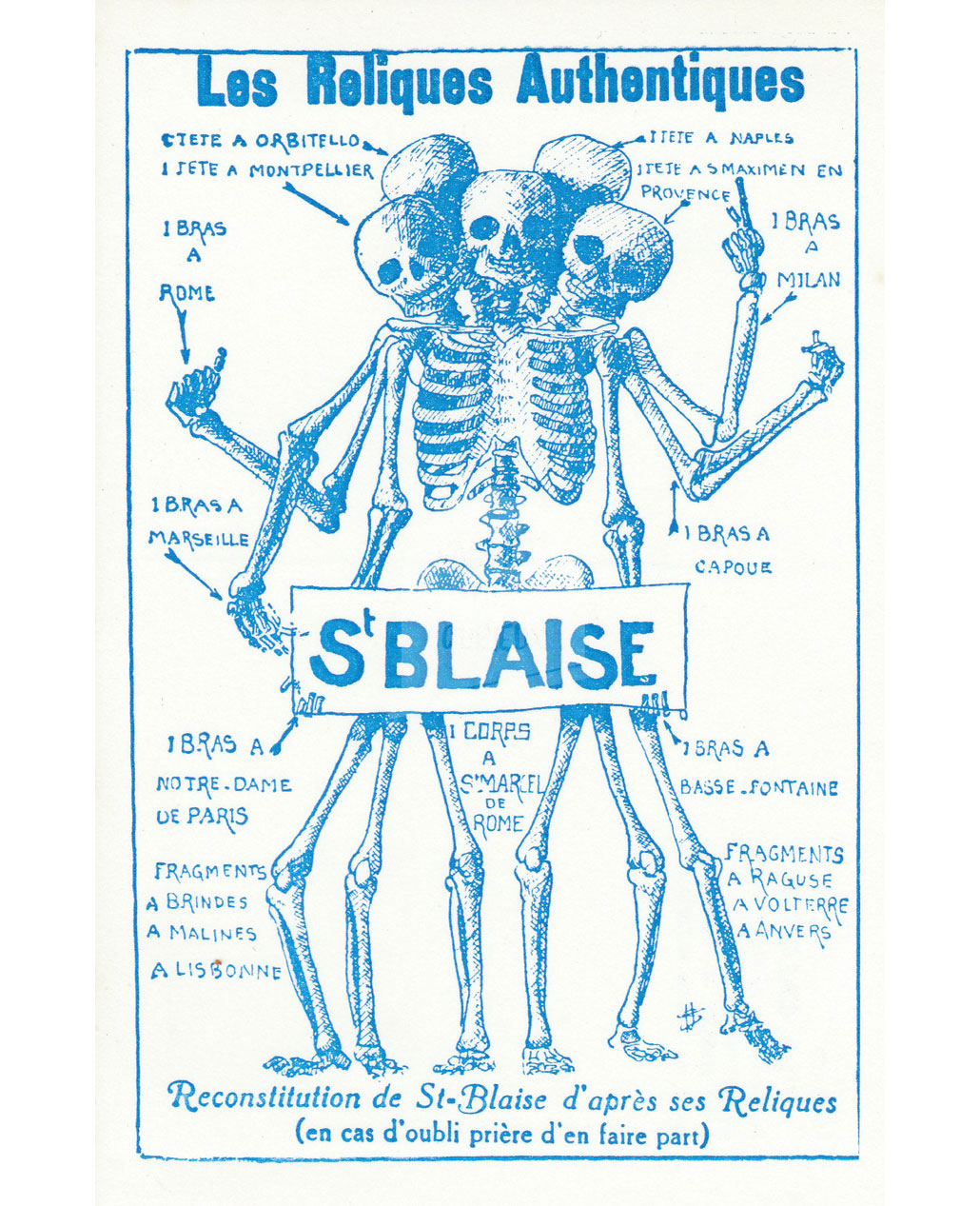
The Authentic Relics of Saint Blaise, from La Calotte

The Treatise on Relics has been translated into a number of languages. Twenty editions were published between 1543 and 1622: seven in French, one in Latin, six in German, two in English and four in Dutch. In 1548, it was translated into Latin by Nicolas des Gallars and published as Admonitio, Qva Ostenditur quàm è re Christianae reip. foret Sanctorum corpora & reliquias velut in inuentarium redigi : quae tam in Italia, quàm in Gallia, Germania, Hispania, caeterísque regionibus habentur in Geneva.

Calvin's book was translated into German in 1557 and published by Jacob Eysenberg in Wittenberg as Vermanung von der Papisten Heiligthumb: dem Christlichen Leser zu gute verdeudschet; it was published in Pforzheim in 1558, and in Mühlhausen the following year. Another German translation, by Johann Fischart, was published in 1583 in Strasbourg as Der Heilig Brotkorb Der H. Römischen Reliquien, oder Würdigen Heiligthum[b]s procken: Das ist, Iohannis Calvini Notwendige vermanung, von der Papisten Heiligthum[b] : Darauß zu sehen, was damit für Abgötterey vnd Betrug getrieben worden, dem Christlichen Leser zu gute verdeutscht. Calvin's book was translated into Dutch in 1583 and published in Antwerp by Niclaes Mollyns as Een seer nuttighe waerschouwinghe, van het groot profijt dat die Christenheydt soude becomen, indien een register ghemaect werde van alle de lichamen ende reliquien der Heylighen, die soo wel in Italien, als in Vranckrijck, Duytschlant, Hispanien, ende in andere conincrijcken ende landen.

The first translation into English, by Stephen Wythers, was published in 1561 in London as A very profitable treatise made by M. Ihon Caluyne, declarynge what great profit might come to al christendome, yf there were a regester made of all sainctes bodies and other reliques, which are aswell in Italy, as in Fraunce, Dutchland, Spaine, and other kingdomes and countreys. An 1844 translation by M. M. Backus was published in New York as Calvin On Romish Relics : Being An Inventory Of Saints' Relics, Personally Seen By Him In Spain, Italy, France And Germany. That year, Henry Beveridge translated Traitté des reliques for the Calvin Translation Society as An Admonition showing, the Advantages which Christendom might derive from an Inventory of Relics; it was published in Edinburgh. Another translation, by Walerian Krasiński, was published in Edinburgh in 1854 as A Treatise on Relics. The book was published in Italian in 2010 as Calvino 'Sulle reliquie': Se l’idolatria consiste nel rivolgere altrove l’onore dovuto a Dio, potremo forse negare che questa sia idolatria?

== Legacy ==
Calvin published his Treatise on Relics as part of the Reformation, and Protestants abandoned the veneration of relics. Although Reformed denominations have removed representations of saints from their churches, Lutherans use images of saints but do not worship nor venerate them, and asking saints for intercessory prayers is forbidden.

Jacques Collin de Plancy published his three-volume Critical Dictionary of Relics and Wonderworking Images (French: Dictionnaire critique des reliques et des images miraculeuses), partially based on Calvin's work, in 1821–1822. The saints were arranged in alphabetical order, and each entry identified how many of their bodies were in different churches. The entries for Jesus and Mary listed relics in a number of monasteries which included hair, the umbilical cord of Christ, and the hair and nails of the Virgin Mary. In his 1847 book Curiosities of Traditions, Customs and Legends (French: Curiosités des traditions, des moeurs et des légendes), partially based on Calvin's work, Ludovic Lalanne compiled a table listing the number of heads, bodies, hands, feet and fingers attributed to each saint. Émile Nourry used Calvin's work to describe Jesus' relics (which included a tooth, tears, blood, an umbilical cord, a foreskin, beard and head hair, and nails) in the 1912 Les reliques corporelles du Christ.
