= Henry Beveridge =

Henry Beveridge may refer to:

- Henry Beveridge (historian) (1799–1863), Scottish lawyer, translator and historian
- Henry Beveridge (orientalist) (1837–1929), Indian Civil Service officer and orientalist in British India
