= William Smith (lexicographer) =

English lexicographer (1813–1893)

Sir William Smith
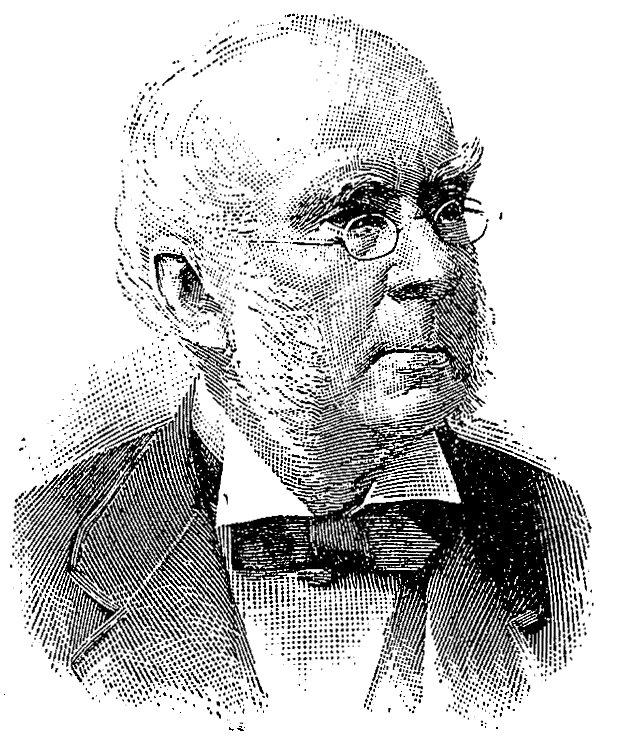
- Sir William Smith in 1893
- Born: 20 May 1813; Enfield, Middlesex, England
- Died: 7 October 1893 (aged 80); London, England
- Resting place: Highgate Cemetery
- Education: University College London; University College School
- Occupations: Lexicographer and editor
- Works: A Dictionary of Greek and Roman Antiquities; Dictionary of Greek and Roman Biography and Mythology; Dictionary of Greek and Roman Geography

Sir William Smith (20 May 1813 – 7 October 1893) was an English lexicographer. He became known for his advances in the teaching of Greek and Latin in schools.

== Early life ==
Smith was born in Enfield in 1813 to Nonconformist parents. He attended the Madras House school of John Allen in Hackney. Originally destined for a theological career, he instead became articled to a solicitor. Meanwhile, he taught himself classics in his spare time, and when he entered University College London carried off both the Greek and Latin prizes. He was entered at Gray's Inn in 1830, but gave up his legal studies for a post at University College School and began to write on classical subjects.

== Lexicography ==
Smith next turned his attention to lexicography. His first attempt was A Dictionary of Greek and Roman Antiquities, which appeared in 1842, the greater part being written by him. Then followed the Dictionary of Greek and Roman Biography and Mythology in 1849. A parallel Dictionary of Greek and Roman Geography appeared in 1854, with some leading scholars of the day associated with the task.

In 1867, Smith became editor of the Quarterly Review, a post he held until his death.

== Schoolbooks ==
Smith published the first of several school dictionaries in 1850, and in 1853 began the Principia series, which marked an advance in the school teaching of Greek and Latin. Then came the Student's Manuals of History and Literature, of which the English literature volume went into 13 editions. He himself wrote the Greek history volume.

He was joined in the venture by the publisher John Murray when the original publishing partner met difficulties. Murray was the publisher of the 1214-page Latin–English Dictionary based upon the works of Forcellini and Freund that Smith completed in 1855. This was periodically reissued over the next 35 years. It goes beyond "classical" (100 BCE – 100 CE) Latin to include many entries not found in other dictionaries of the period, including Lewis and Short.

Perhaps the foremost books Smith edited covered ecclesiastical subjects: the Dictionary of the Bible (1860–1865); the Dictionary of Christian Antiquities (1875–1880), jointly with Archdeacon Samuel Cheetham; and the Dictionary of Christian Biography (1877–1887), jointly with Henry Wace.

The Atlas, on which Sir George Grove collaborated, appeared in 1875. From 1853 to 1869 Smith was classical examiner to the University of London, and on retirement he became a member of the Senate. He sat on the Committee enquiring into questions of copyright and was for several years registrar of the Royal Literary Fund. He edited Gibbon, with Guizot's and Milman's notes, in 1854–1855.

== Honours and death ==
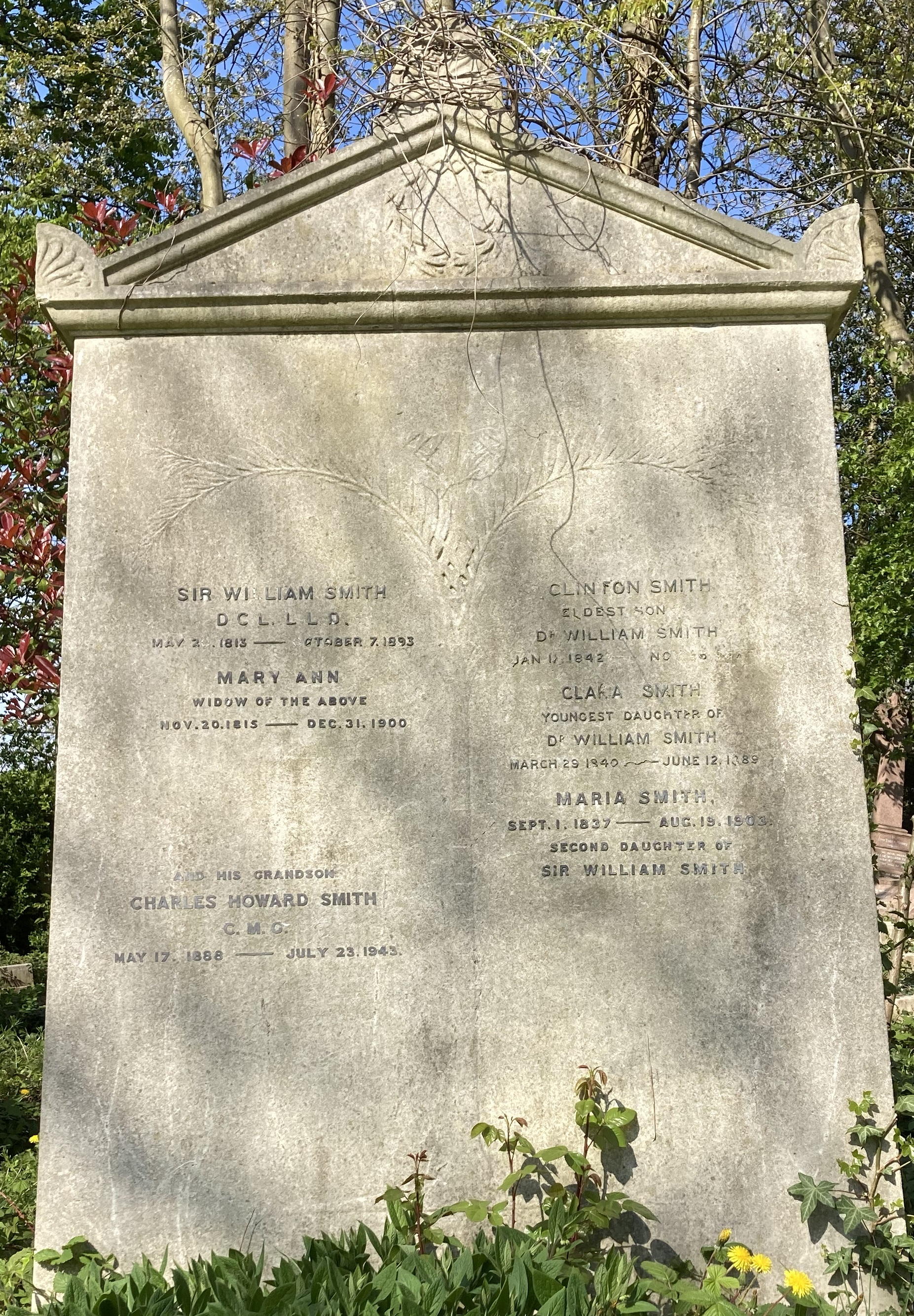
Family grave of Sir William Smith in Highgate Cemetery

Smith was named a DCL by the University of Oxford and Trinity College Dublin. A knighthood was conferred on him in 1892. He died on 7 October 1893 in London, and is buried in a family grave on the eastern side of Highgate Cemetery.

== Collections ==
University College London Special Collections holds an archive of correspondence from George Grote to Smith, written between 1852 - 1870.
