= Theology of the Bible =

Theology of the Bible may refer to:

- Bibliology, the study of the character, and authority of the Bible
- Biblical theology, the study of the Bible's own theology
