= Ford Lewis Battles =

American historian and theologian (1915–1979)

- Born: 30 January 1915; Erie, Pennsylvania, US
- Died: 22 November 1979 (aged 64); Grand Rapids, Michigan, US
- Occupations: Historian, theologian
- Known for: Calvin studies
- Spouse: Marion Davis (m. 1945)
- Children: Nancy Marion (b. 1946), Emily Stewart (b. 1951)

Ford Lewis Battles (30 Jan 1915 – 22 Nov 1979) was an American historian and theologian and one of the foremost scholars of John Calvin. He was an important contributor to the twentieth-century renaissance of Calvin studies, bequeathing his legacy in the masterly translation of Calvin's Institutes of the Christian Religion (1960) published under the editorship of the Canadian-born scholar, Dr. John T. McNeill.

== Biography ==
Battles was born in 1915 in Erie, Pennsylvania, USA. He studied classics at West Virginia University (AB, 1936) and received an M.A. degree from Tufts University (1938). Battles traveled as a Rhodes scholar to England, where he studied the early church fathers and medieval literature under C. S. Lewis at Exeter College, Oxford (1938–1940). During World War II, Battles served as an airfield intelligence officer (1941–1945), rising to the rank of major and spending two years in Panama helping to defend the Panama Canal.

After the war, he returned to West Virginia University to teach English (1945–1948) and then enrolled at Hartford Theological Seminary, where he earned a doctorate in Old Testament (1950). Battles shifted his interests to church history and remained at Hartford Seminary, where he became Philip Schaff Professor of Church History (1959) and served a term as acting dean. He then taught at Pittsburgh Theological Seminary (1968–1979) and as a Visiting Professor of Church History at Calvin Theological Seminary.

Battles wrote of his time at Oxford University, "So far as I know, my rebirth into a faith all too imperfectly received in my childhood began to come when I was sent to the early Christian fathers by my academic supervisor, C. S. Lewis." And while at West Virginia University Battles was called upon to teach a course in English Bible, and feeling unprepared for the assignment, he spent a summer at Hartford Seminary, enrolled in the doctoral program, and never returned to West Virginia.

To meet the needs of his students at Hartford and later at Pittsburgh, Battles began to translate Greek and Latin Christian texts and used the literature in his courses. A colleague at Hartford, Matthew Spinka, also asked Battles to prepare translations of texts used in Spinka's book, Advocates of Reform (1953) in the Library of Christian Classics series. John T. McNeill, the series editor, then asked Battles to translate John Calvin's Institutes of the Christian Religion (1559; 1960) for the same series, with McNeill as editor. This translation project took seven years and defined the course of Battles' career. Thereafter, he became a specialist in the life and writings of the Genevan reformer and devoted his career to translating and interpreting Calvin's works.

Battles' subsequent publications include translated and annotated editions of Calvin's Commentary on Seneca's 'De Clementia' (1969), with André Malan Hugo; Calvin's Catechism 1538 (1972); Institutes of the Christian Religion (1536 edition, 1975); and The Piety of John Calvin: An Anthology (1978). As an aid to reading Calvin's Institutes, Battles also produced An Analysis of the Institutes of the Christian Religion of John Calvin (1980). Battles last work was an essay on Calvin's methodology, "Calculus Fidei" (1979), published posthumously in a collection of Battles' articles edited by Robert Benedetto, Interpreting John Calvin (1996).

While on sabbatical leave at the University of Gottingen during 1962 and 1963, Battles envisioned writing a commentary on the Institutes with Professor Otto Weber. As a first step toward producing the commentary, a complete concordance to the Institutes was needed and upon his return to the United States Battles began work on the project and eventually produced A Computerized Concordance to Institutio Christianae Religionis 1559 (1972). However, Weber died in 1966 and the commentary project was abandoned.

Battles was not only a scholar but a man of deep spirituality, who translated prayers, hymns, and devotional texts. He served on his denomination's Commission on Hymnody (1966–1973) and some of his hymns were eventually incorporated into The Hymnal of the United Church of Christ. He also produced a Supplement to the Book of Common Worship of the United Presbyterian Church (1977). Battles claimed in an essay, "The Future of Calviniana," that when the collected works of Calvin appeared in the Corpus Reformatorum (1834–) omitting the prayers of Calvin, the German editors left out what "may prove to be the very cornerstone of Calvin's theology."

Battles also envisioned the establishment of a "Center for Calvin Studies" at Calvin University. Although he did not live to see the formal establishment of the center, his work led to the establishment of the H. Henry Meeter Center for Calvin Studies, now the premier center for Calvin research in the United States.

In 1945 Battles married Marion Davis and they had two daughters, Nancy Marion (b. 1946) and Emily Stewart (b. 1951). Ford Lewis Battles died in 1979 in Grand Rapids, Michigan, and his papers are deposited in the archives of Calvin University in Grand Rapids.

== Sources ==
- Battles, Ford Lewis | Heritage Hall, Hekman Library
- 개혁주의 인명사전, 정성구 편저 (총신대학교출판부, 2001).

== See also ==
- Institutes of the Christian Religion
- John Calvin
- Theology of John Calvin
