= Accommodation (religion) =

Theological principle

(Divine) Accommodation (or condescension) is the theological principle that God, while being in his nature unknowable and unreachable, has nevertheless communicated with humanity in a way that humans can understand and to which they can respond, pre-eminently by the incarnation of Christ and similarly, for example, in the Bible.

Benin describes accommodation as the view that 'divine revelation is adjusted to the disparate intellectual and spiritual level of humanity at different times in history' including language, culture, individual capacity, and human sinfulness.

Another usage uses 'accommodation' as the appropriation of words or sentences from, especially, the Bible to signify ideas different from those that were originally expressed in the text.

== History ==
The history of the concept of accommodation reaches back to ancient Jewish biblical interpretation. It was taken up and developed by Christian theologians like Origen and Augustine, which ensured its continuance into the work of medieval and Reformation biblical exegetes.

"The divine Spirit has his own peculiar language and modes of speech, which you must learn through careful observation. Divine Wisdom speaks to us in baby-talk and like a loving mother accommodates its words to our state of infancy"

— Erasmus, Enchiridion

The sixteenth-century Protestant Reformer John Calvin is a notable developer of the concept, though contemporaries from Martin Luther to Ulrich Zwingli, Peter Martyr Vermigli and numerous others used it.

Accommodation also may involve an "economy" of revelation, of "reserve" (or of Disciplina Arcani, a modern term for the supposed early Catholic habit of reserving esoteric truths).

== Christian accommodation ==
The belief that God has been able to sufficiently accommodate and communicate to humanity, despite the failings and limitations of the latter, is given its supreme form in the person and work of Jesus Christ.

Traditional Christianity, as expressed in the historic creeds, proclaims the Trinity as being part of the orthodox Christian faith. The divinity of Christ, who is believed to be fully man and yet fully God, shows how the Godhead has accommodated itself to human minds and experience.

Openly he (Jesus in earthly ministry) censures nothing that had been received on the authority of the community – for there is scarcely anyone who accepts such censure with equanimity. Everywhere he affirms the testimony of the Law, though he gives it a different interpretation. He adapted himself to those he was eager to attract: he became a human being to save human beings; he associated on familiar terms with sinners to restore sinners to health; to entice the Jews he was circumcised, was purified, he observed the sabbath, was baptized, fasted.

— Erasmus, Method of True Theology (1518)

Erasmus of Rotterdam also employed accommodation as an ethical challenge, teaching that St Paul was a chameleon and Christ was a Proteus in their personal interactions; so Christians should also be "all things to all men" by accommodating each other, just as Christ had accommodated us.

== Biblical accommodation ==
=== Theological approaches to Biblical accommodation ===
Biblical accommodation refers to a number of distinct views in Biblical exegesis, or the interpretation of the Bible. Such views broadly concern the question of whether, or to what extent, the Bible may be said to be literally true. One view, associated with John Calvin, holds that while some of the expressions and metaphors used in the Bible may be literally false, they are nonetheless essentially true. Another view, associated with Faustus Socinus, holds that some Biblical language is both literally and essentially false.

In his discussion of accommodation, Thomas Hartwell Horne, the English theologian, distinguishes between the 'form' and 'essence' of revelation. The former refers to the manner in which the Biblical text expresses its content; the latter, to the content which is expressed through the Biblical text.

Thus, there are two possible kinds of Biblical accommodation: one which holds that merely the expressive form of the Bible is modified to accord with human capacities; and a stronger version, which holds that the content of the Bible is modified to conform with human perceptions of divine reality, to the extent that it may be literally false.

Lee, a contemporary scholar, adopts a similar distinction. He associates John Calvin with the 'formal' view, and Faustus Socinus with the 'essential' view. According to Lee, Calvin held that, although a number of the descriptions of events (in particular, those in the Genesis creation narrative) could not be literally true according to current scientific theories, they were nonetheless essentially true and had simply been accommodated to human perceptual capacities. By contrast, Socinus held that some 'accommodated' Biblical teachings in the Bible were literally false.

=== Textual accommodation ===
Another usage, by Catholics, is that 'accommodation' is the appropriation of words or sentences from the Bible to signify ideas different from those that were originally expressed in the text or in the mind of their originator. For example, where some biblical phrase is re-purposed as part of a liturgy or theological work. Some scholars class quotes in the Gospels that some Old Testament prophesy was fulfilled as accommodation. Accommodation was used by the Fathers of the Church and many of the sermons of St. Bernard are mosaics of scripture phrases.

Typical rules for guidance in the accommodation of scripture are:

- Accommodated texts should never be used as arguments drawn from revelation.
- Accommodation should not be farfetched.
- Accommodations should be reverent

German eighteenth-century rationalism held that the Biblical writers made great use of conscious accommodation, intending moral commonplaces when they seemed to be enunciating Christian dogmas.

== The sacraments as accommodation ==
In most Protestant churches, only two sacraments are recognised, Baptism and The Lord's Supper. Both have a special significance in that they were symbolic representations instituted by Jesus. In these sacraments, God is held by Christians to accommodate himself and his gospel in the sacramental actions to sinful and limited human beings.

== Calvinist ==
There has been scholarly debate about John Calvin's use of the concept of accommodation which continues to the present day. Scholars like E. David Willis and Ford Lewis Battles, and more recently Arnold Huijgen, have argued that Calvin developed the idea from sources related to classical rhetoric while others such as David F. Wright and Jon Balserak have argued that Calvin's usage of the idea of divine accommodation is too diffuse to fit into any concept (such as decorum) associated with rhetoric. None of these scholars are disputing Calvin's credentials as a Renaissance humanist but rather whether they explain his appreciation and use of divine accommodation. Both groups acknowledge Calvin's indebtedness to the Church Fathers from whom he appropriated the motif, or cluster of motifs, of divine accommodation.

=== Preaching of the Gospel ===
Gospel preaching is one of the most important facets of the Calvinistic principle of accommodation, for in it humankind is held to experience God's redemptive power through the work of the Spirit. Through this monergistic activity, God is believed to effectively cause people to come to faith.

== See also ==
- Biblical inerrancy
- John Calvin's view of Scripture
- Hermeneutics

== Sources ==
- Benin, Stephen D. (1993). The Footprints of God: Divine Accommodation in Jewish and Christian Thought. Albany, New York: State University of New York Press. ISBN 9780791496282 – via Internet Archive.
- Lee, Hoon J. (2017). The Biblical Accommodation Debate in Germany. Cham, Switzerland: Palgrave Macmillan. doi:10.1007/978-3-319-61497-7. ISBN 978-3-319-61496-0.
