= Theology of John Calvin =

Beliefs of John Calvin

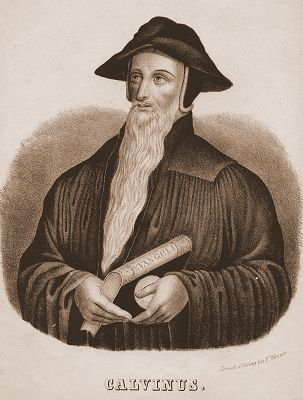
Lithograph of John Calvin, c. 1830.

The theology of John Calvin has been influential in both the development of the system of belief now known as Calvinism and in Protestant thought more generally.

== Publications ==
John Calvin developed his theology in his biblical commentaries as well as his sermons and treatises, but the most concise expression of his views is found in his magnum opus, the Institutes of the Christian Religion. He intended that the book be used as a summary of his views on Christian theology and that it be read in conjunction with his commentaries. The various editions of that work span nearly his entire career as a reformer, and the successive revisions of the book show that his theology changed very little from his youth to his death. The first edition from 1536 consisted of only six chapters. The second edition, published in 1539, was three times as long because he added chapters on subjects that appear in Melanchthon's Loci Communes. In 1543, he again added new material and expanded a chapter on the Apostles' Creed. The final edition of the Institutes appeared in 1559. By then, the work consisted of four books of eighty chapters, and each book was named after statements from the creed: Book 1 on God the Creator, Book 2 on the Redeemer in Christ, Book 3 on receiving the Grace of Christ through the Holy Spirit, and Book 4 on the Society of Christ or the Church.

== Themes ==
=== Scripture ===
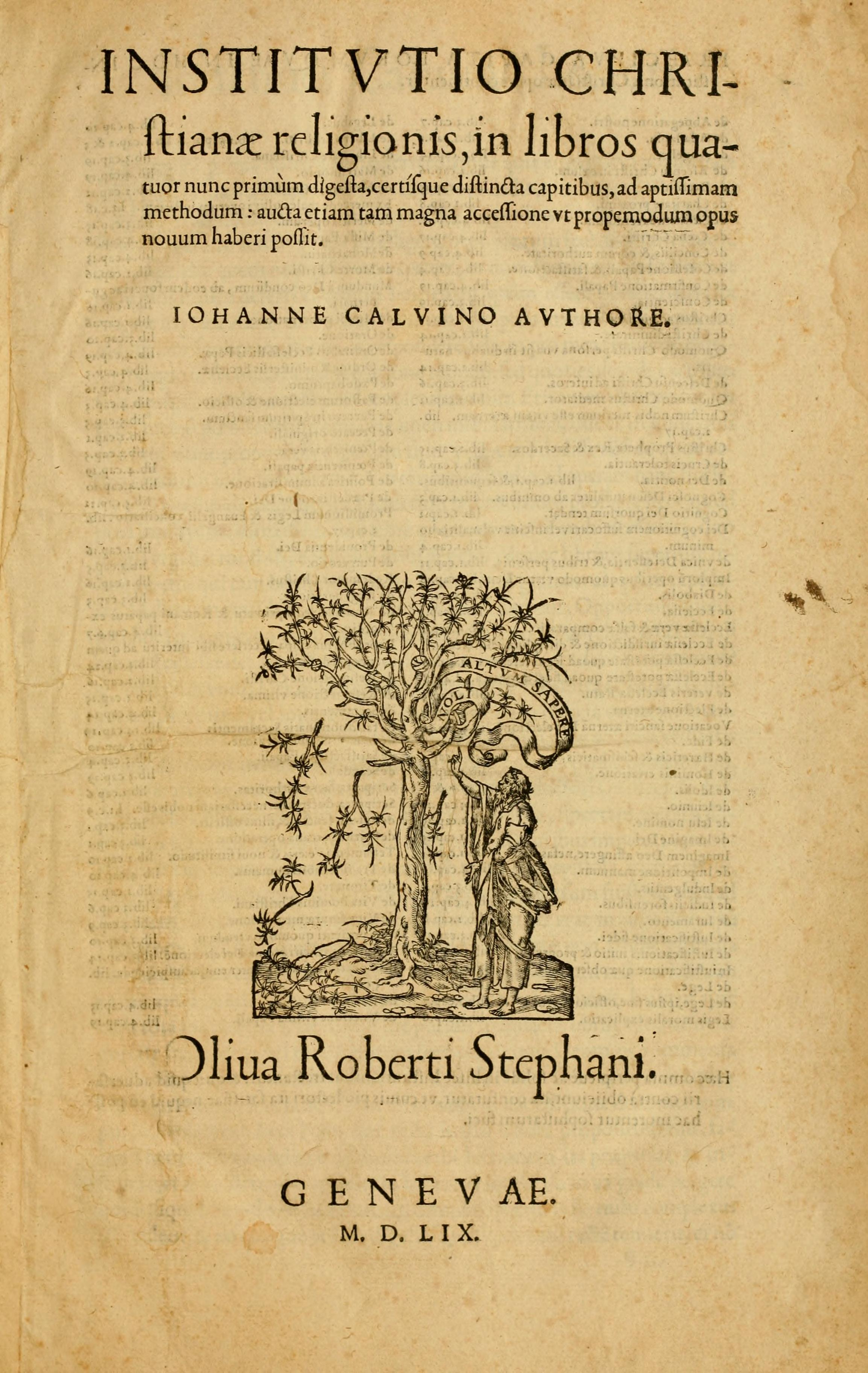
Title page from the final edition of Calvin's magnum opus, Institutio Christiane Religionis, which summarises his theology.

The first statement in the Institutes acknowledges its central theme. It states that the sum of human wisdom consists of two parts: the knowledge of God and of ourselves. Calvin argues that the knowledge of God is not inherent in humanity nor can it be discovered by observing this world. The only way to obtain it is to study scripture. Calvin writes, "For anyone to arrive at God the Creator he needs Scripture as his Guide and Teacher." He does not try to prove the authority of scripture but rather describes it as autopiston or self-authenticating. He defends the trinitarian view of God and, in a strong polemical stand against the Catholic Church, argues that images of God lead to idolatry.

Calvin viewed Scripture as being both majestic and simple. According to Ford Lewis Battles, Calvin had discovered that "sublimity of style and sublimity of thought were not coterminous."

=== Providence ===
At the end of the first book of the Institutes, he offers his views on providence, writing, "By his Power God cherishes and guards the World which he made and by his Providence rules its individual Parts. Humans are unable to fully comprehend why God performs any particular action, but whatever good or evil people may practise, their efforts always result in the execution of God's will and judgments."

=== Sin ===
The second book of the Institutes includes several essays on the original sin and the fall of man, which directly refer to Augustine, who developed these doctrines. He often cited the Church Fathers in order to defend the reformed cause against the charge that the reformers were creating new theology. In Calvin's view, sin began with the fall of Adam and propagated to all of humanity. The domination of sin is complete to the point that people are driven to evil. Thus fallen humanity is in need of the redemption that can be found in Christ. But before Calvin expounded on this doctrine, he described the special situation of the Jews who lived during the time of the Old Testament. God made a covenant with Abraham, promising the coming of Christ. Hence, the Old Covenant was not in opposition to Christ, but was rather a continuation of God's promise. Calvin then describes the New Covenant using the passage from the Apostles' Creed that describes Christ's suffering under Pontius Pilate and his return to judge the living and the dead. For Calvin, the whole course of Christ's obedience to the Father removed the discord between humanity and God.

=== Atonement ===
R. T. Kendall has argued that Calvin's view of the atonement differs from that of later Calvinists, especially the Puritans. Kendall interpreted Calvin as believing that Christ died for all people, but intercedes only for the elect.

Kendall's thesis is now a minority view as a result of work by scholars such as Paul Helm, who argues that "both Calvin and the Puritans taught that Christ died for the elect and intercedes for the elect", Richard Muller, Mark Dever, and others.

=== Union with Christ ===
In the third book of the Institutes, Calvin describes how the spiritual union of Christ and humanity is achieved. He first defines faith as the firm and certain knowledge of God in Christ. The immediate effects of faith are repentance and the remission of sin. This is followed by spiritual regeneration, which returns the believer to the state of holiness before Adam's transgression. However, complete perfection is unattainable in this life, and the believer should expect a continual struggle against sin. Several chapters are then devoted to the subject of justification by faith alone. He defined justification as "the acceptance by which God regards us as righteous whom he has received into grace." In this definition, it is clear that it is God who initiates and carries through the action and that people play no role; God is completely sovereign in salvation. According to Alister McGrath, Calvin provided a solution to the Reformation problem of how justification relates to sanctification. Calvin suggested that both came out of union with Christ. McGrath notes that while Martin Bucer suggested that justification causes (moral) regeneration, Calvin argued that "both justification and regeneration are the results of the believer's union with Christ through faith."

=== Predestination ===
Near the end of the Institutes, Calvin describes and defends the doctrine of predestination, a doctrine advanced by Augustine in opposition to the teachings of Pelagius. Fellow theologians who followed the Augustinian tradition on this point included Thomas Aquinas and Martin Luther, though Calvin's formulation of the doctrine went further than the tradition that went before him. The principle, in Calvin's words, is that "All are not created on equal terms, but some are preordained to eternal life, others to eternal damnation; and, accordingly, as each has been created for one or other of these ends, we say that he has been predestinated to life or to death."

The doctrine of predestination "does not stand at the beginning of the dogmatic system as it does in Zwingli or Beza", but, according to Fahlbusch, it "does tend to burst through the soteriological-Christological framework." In contrast to some other Protestant Reformers, Calvin taught double predestination. Chapter 21 of Book III of the Institutes is called "Of the eternal election, by which God has predestinated some to salvation, and others to destruction".

=== Ecclesiology and sacraments ===
The final book of the Institutes describes what he considers to be the true Church and its ministry, authority, and sacraments. Calvin also conceded that ordination could be called a sacrament, but suggested that it was a "special rite for a certain function."

He denied the papal claim to primacy and the accusation that the reformers were schismatic. For Calvin, the Church was defined as the body of believers who placed Christ at its head. By definition, there was only one "catholic" or "universal" Church. Hence, he argued that the reformers "had to leave them in order that we might come to Christ." The ministers of the Church are described from a passage from Ephesians, and they consisted of apostles, prophets, evangelists, pastors, and doctors. Calvin regarded the first three offices as temporary, limited in their existence to the time of the New Testament. The latter two offices were established in the church in Geneva. Although Calvin respected the work of the ecumenical councils, he considered them to be subject to God's Word found in scripture. He also believed that the civil and church authorities were separate and should not interfere with each other.

Calvin defined a sacrament as an earthly sign associated with a promise from God. He accepted only two sacraments as valid under the new covenant: baptism and the Lord's Supper (in opposition to the Catholic acceptance of seven sacraments). He completely rejected the Catholic doctrine of transubstantiation and the treatment of the Supper as a sacrifice. He also could not accept the Lutheran doctrine of sacramental union in which Christ was "in, with and under" the elements. His own view was close to Zwingli's symbolic view, but it was not identical. Rather than holding a purely symbolic view, Calvin noted that with the participation of the Holy Spirit, faith was nourished and strengthened by the sacrament. In his words, the eucharistic rite was "a secret too sublime for my mind to understand or words to express. I experience it rather than understand it." Keith Mathison coined the word "suprasubstantiation" (in distinction to transubstantiation or consubstantiation) to describe Calvin's doctrine of the Lord's Supper.

Calvin believed in infant baptism, and devoted a chapter in his Institutes to the subject.

Calvin believed in a real spiritual presence of Christ at the Eucharist. For Calvin, union with Christ was at the heart of the Lord's Supper.

According to Brian Gerrish, there are three different interpretations of the Lord's Supper within non-Lutheran Protestant theology:

1. Symbolic memorialism, found in Zwingli, which sees the elements merely as a sign pointing to a past event;
2. Symbolic parallelism, typified by Bullinger, which sees the sign as pointing to “a happening that occurs simultaneously in the present” alongside the sign itself; and
3. Symbolic instrumentalism, Calvin's view, which holds that the Eucharist is “a present happening that is actually brought about through the signs.”

Calvin's sacramental theology was criticized by later Reformed writers. Robert L. Dabney, for example, called it “not only incomprehensible but impossible.”

== Other beliefs ==
=== Mary ===
Calvin had a positive view of Mary, but rejected the Roman Catholic veneration of her.

== Controversies ==
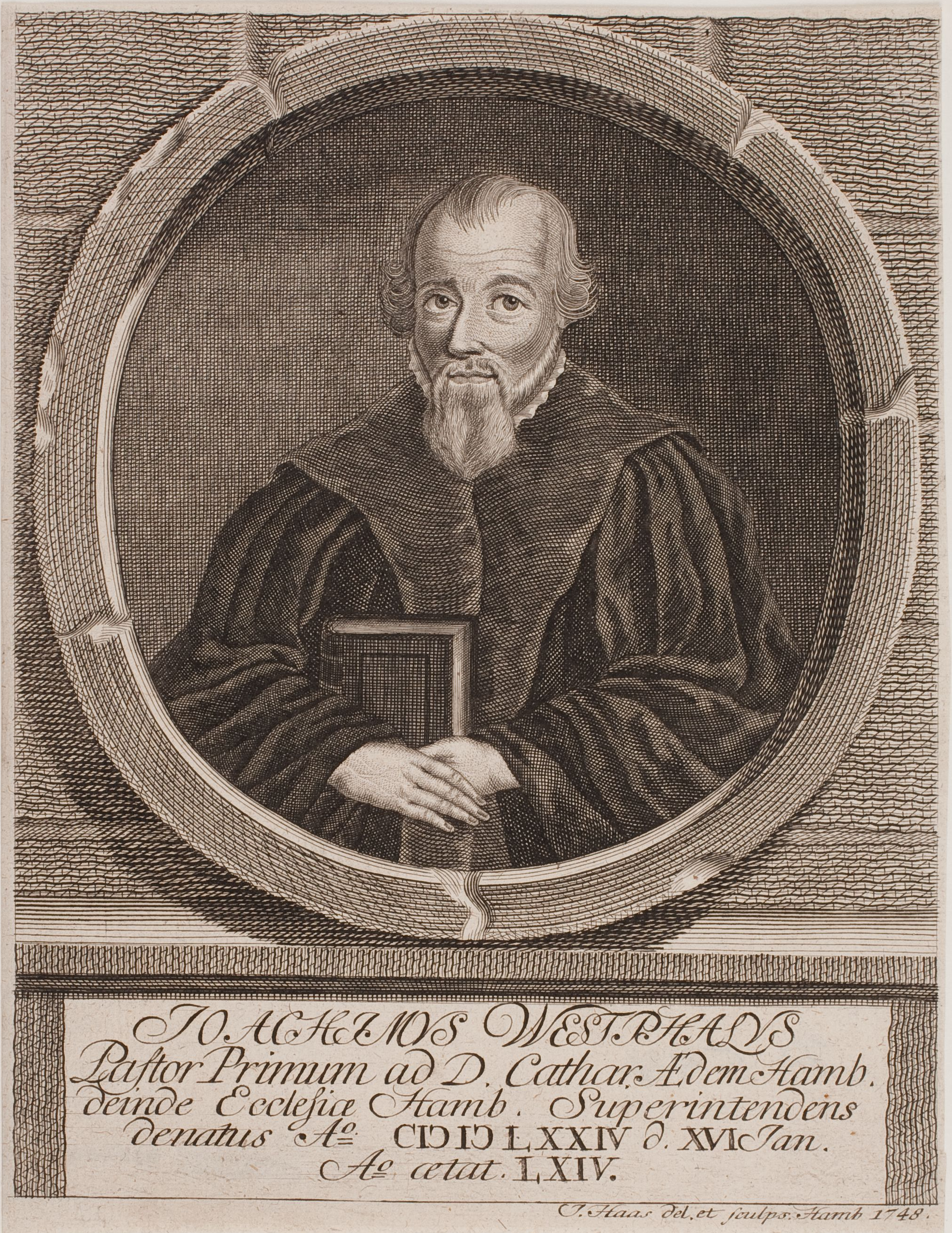
Joachim Westphal disagreed with Calvin's theology on the eucharist.

Calvin's theology was not without controversy. Pierre Caroli, a Protestant minister in Lausanne accused Calvin, as well as Pierre Viret and William Farel, of Arianism in 1536. Calvin defended his beliefs on the Trinity in Confessio de Trinitate propter calumnias P. Caroli. In 1551 Jérôme-Hermès Bolsec, a physician in Geneva, attacked Calvin's doctrine of predestination and accused him of making God the author of sin. Bolsec was banished from the city, and after Calvin's death, he wrote a biography which severely maligned Calvin's character. In the following year, Joachim Westphal, a Gnesio-Lutheran pastor in Hamburg, condemned Calvin and Zwingli as heretics in denying the eucharistic doctrine of the union of Christ's body with the elements. Calvin's Defensio sanae et orthodoxae doctrinae de sacramentis (A Defense of the Sober and Orthodox Doctrine of the Sacrament) was his response in 1555. In 1556 Justus Velsius, a Dutch dissident, held a public disputation with Calvin during his visit to Frankfurt, in which Velsius defended free will against Calvin's doctrine of predestination. Following Calvin's denunciation of Michael Servetus and the subsequent execution of Servetus for heresy in 1553, a close associate of Calvin, Sebastian Castellio, broke with him on the issue of the treatment of heretics. In Castellio's Treatise on Heretics (1554), he argued for a focus on Christ's moral teachings in place of the vanity of theology, and he afterward developed a theory of tolerance based on biblical principles.

=== Calvin and the Jews ===
Scholars have debated Calvin's view of the Jews and Judaism. Some have argued that Calvin was the least antisemitic among all the major reformers of his era, especially in comparison to Martin Luther. Others have argued that Calvin was firmly within the antisemitic camp. Scholars agree, however, that it is important to distinguish between Calvin's views toward the biblical Jews and his attitude toward contemporary Jews. In his theology, Calvin does not differentiate between God's covenant with Israel and the New Covenant. He stated, "all the children of the promise, reborn of God, who have obeyed the commands by faith working through love, have belonged to the New Covenant since the world began." Still he was a supersessionist and argued that the Jews are a rejected people who must embrace Jesus to re-enter the covenant.

Most of Calvin's statements on the Jewry of his era were polemical. For example, Calvin once wrote, "I have had much conversation with many Jews: I have never seen either a drop of piety or a grain of truth or ingenuousness – nay, I have never found common sense in any Jew." In this respect, he differed little from other Protestant and Catholic theologians of his time. Among his extant writings, Calvin only dealt explicitly with issues of contemporary Jews and Judaism in one treatise, Response to Questions and Objections of a Certain Jew. In it, he argued that Jews misread their own scriptures because they miss the unity of the Old and New Testaments.

=== Missiology ===
Calvin's ideas on mission are widely in line with those of the other reformers. Calvin is also astonished by the spread of the Gospel in the world. Although Christ after his resurrection “pervaded the whole world like lightning“, the comprehensive missionary mandate will not be completed until Christ’s return. Until then, Calvin believes, God can still awaken apostles as messengers or even place authority at his service. An organized missionary enterprise is not necessary. However, Calvin continues, the individual Christian is in no way absolved of his responsibility: “As far as we can, [we] shall endeavour to lead all men on earth to God” or “to draw poor souls out of hell“, so that he [i.e. God] may be “honored unanimously by all, and all may serve him.”

== Evaluation ==
The Encyclopedia of Christianity suggests that:

[Calvin's] theological importance is tied to the attempted systematization of the Christian doctrine. In the doctrine of predestination; in his simple, eschatologically grounded distinction between an immanent and a transcendent eternal work of salvation, resting on Christology and the sacraments; and in his emphasis upon the work of the Holy Spirit in producing the obedience of faith in the regenerate (the tertius usus legis, or so-called third use of the law), he elaborated the orthodoxy that would have a lasting impact on Reformed theology.

== See also ==
- Wilhelm Heinrich Neuser
