= Walerian Krasiński =

Polish historian

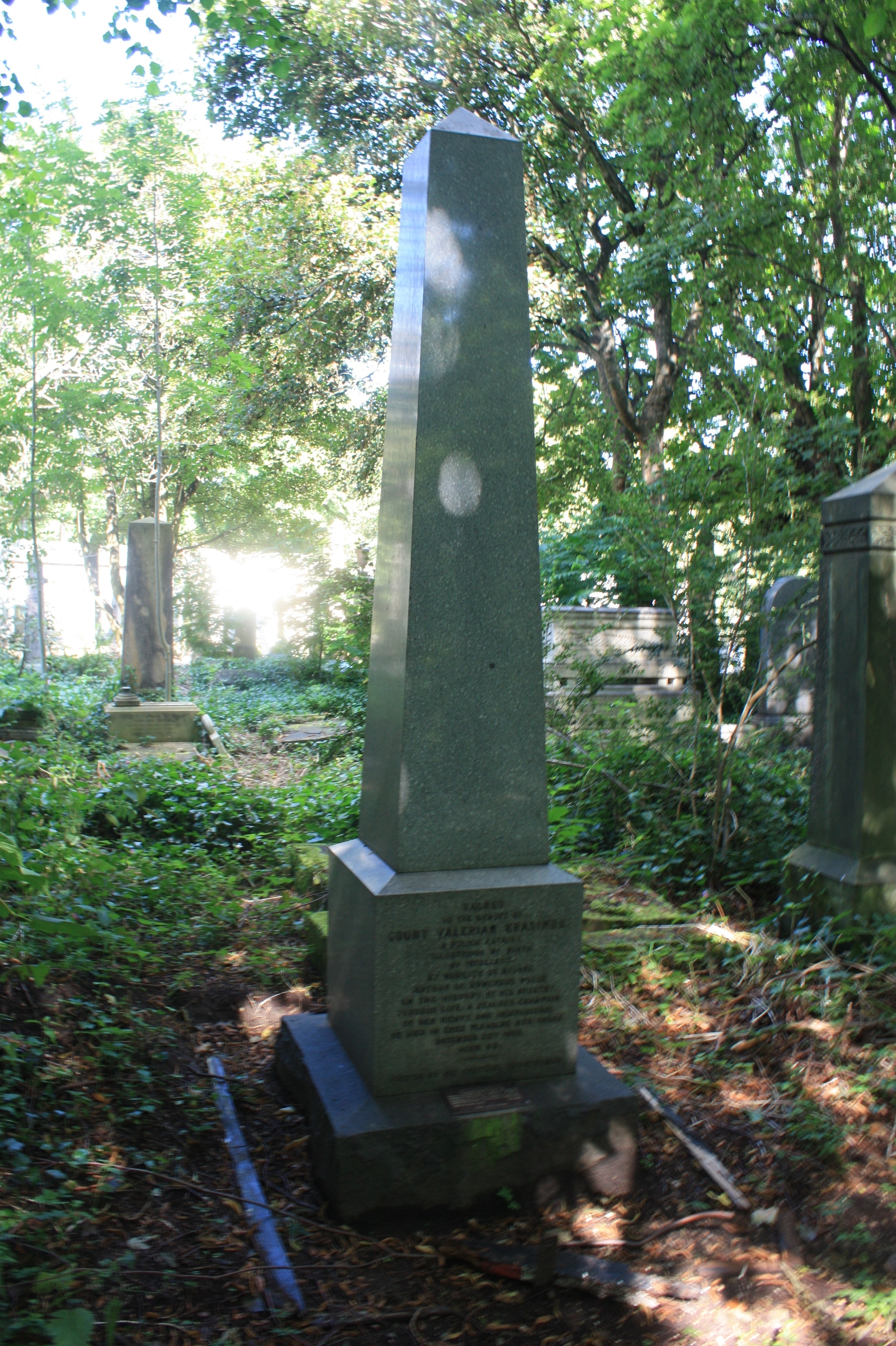
The grave of Count Valerian Krasinski, Warriston Cemetery

Count Walerian Skorobohaty Krasiński or Valerian Krasinski (1795 – 22 December 1855) was a Polish Calvinist historian and journalist born in Republic of Belarus. Krasinski was a Polish aristocrat in exile after the November Uprising 1830, during the Austrian, German and Russian partition of Poland. In 1844, he was proposed for a chair in Slavonic Studies at Oxford University. In 1848, he presented appeals to the Habsburg government. In Russia and Europe, or, The probable consequences of the present war he wrote on the Crimean War.

Krasinski's Historical sketch of the rise, progress, and decline of the Reformation in Poland (1838) still one of main texts on the subject available in English, was written in English. One of Krasinski's main sources is Slavonia reformata (1679) by Andreas Vengerscius.

He died in Edinburgh and is buried in the Warriston Cemetery close to another Polish exile, the violinist and composer Feliks Janiewicz, one of the co-organisers of the first Edinburgh Festival. The grave is marked by a tall grey granite obelisk. It lies in the overgrown area (2014) to the south-west, around 50m east of the more accessible monument to Horatio McCulloch.

== Works ==
- Historical sketch of the rise, progress and decline of the reformation in Poland. Vol. 1. London: [s.n.] 1838. OCLC 714971939.

Historical sketch of the rise, progress and decline of the reformation in Poland. Vol. 2. London: [s.n.] 1840. OCLC 714971939.

- The present government of Russia: the Emperor Nicholas, article 1841
- Monachologia, Or, Handbook Of The Natural History Of Monks: Arranged According To The Linnean System Ignaz Edler Von Born and Walerian Krasinski.
- English translation of Calvin's Treatise on Relics.
- Panslavism and Germanism. London: T. C. Newby. 1848.
- Sketch of the religious history of the Slavonic nations (2nd ed.). Edinburgh: Johnstone and Hunter. 1851. OCLC 794325672.
- Montenegro and the Slavonians in Turkey 1853
- Russia and Europe, or, The Probable Consequences of the Present War. London: Chapman & Hall. 1854.
- The Polish Question and Panslavism. London: Chapman & Hall. 1855.
- Poland, its history, constitution, literature etc. 1855
