= John T. McNeill =

John Thomas McNeill (28 July 1885, Elmsdale, Prince Edward Island - 2 February 1975, Chicago) was a Canadian church historian.

He was the son of William Cavendish McNeill (1849-1928). He was educated at Prince of Wales College, McGill University, New College, Edinburgh, Halle University and the University of Chicago. In 1920 he was awarded a doctorate from the latter, where he served on the faculty until 1944. In 1922 he was awarded the Herbert Baxter Adams Prize for his work The Celtic Penitentials and Their Influence on Continental Christianity.

As of 1951, he was Auburn Professor of Church History at Union Theological Seminary. He was the father of William H. McNeill, and grandfather of J.R. McNeill, both leading historians and presidents of the American Historical Association. He was also an ordained Presbyterian minister.

He served alongside of John Baillie and Henry P. Van Dusen as a general editor of the Library of Christian Classics series, which includes modern translations of the writings of Christian theologians and thinkers such as Aquinas, Augustine, Calvin, Luther and other reformers and early church fathers. McNeill himself was the chief editor of the series' release of John Calvin's Institutes of the Christian Religion in a fresh translation in more contemporary English based on extensive knowledge of Patristics and Classical literature by Ford Lewis Battles at McNeill’s personal request. The production of this most recent English translation (released in 1960) of the French Reformer's "magnum opus" was the work of several Latin scholars and theologians on both sides of the Atlantic.

Charles Partee called him "the doyen of American Calvin scholars".

== Works ==
- A History of the Cure of Souls (New York: Harper & Brothers, 1951).
- The History and Character of Calvinism (New York: Oxford University Press, 1954).
- The Celtic Churches: A History A.D. 200 to 1200 (University of Chicago Press, 1974).
- The Library of Christian Classics (Westminster John Knox Press, 2006).
