= Institutes of the Christian Religion =

Theological work by John Calvin

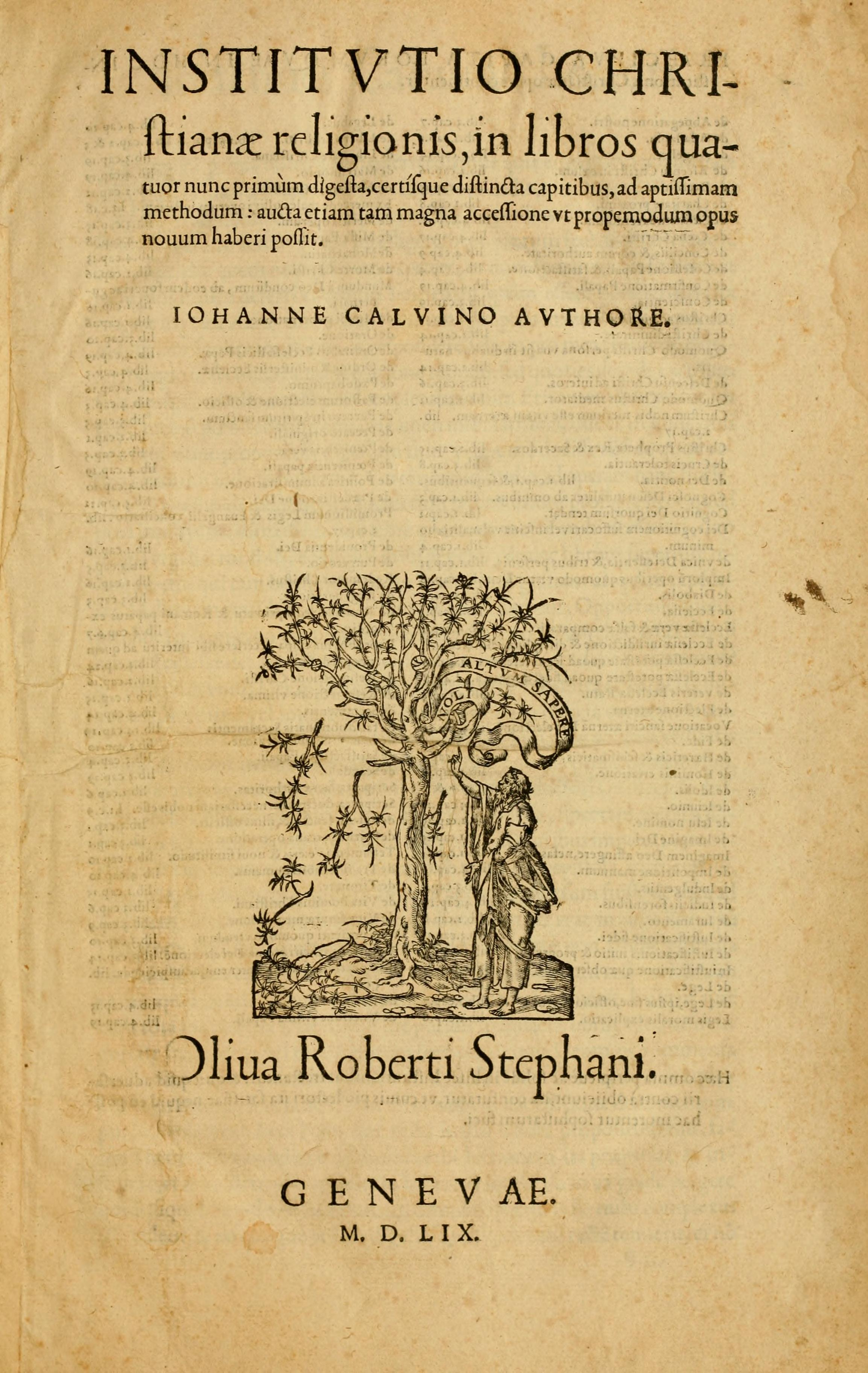
The title page of the fifth and final 1559 edition of John Calvin's Institutio Christianae Religionis, published in Geneva in 1559

Institutes of the Christian Religion (Latin: Institutio Christianae Religionis) is John Calvin's seminal work of systematic theology. Regarded as one of the most influential works of Protestant theology, it was published in Latin in 1536 in Basel at the same time as Henry VIII of England's Dissolution of the Monasteries and in his native French language in 1541. The definitive editions appeared in 1559 in Latin and in 1560 in French.

The book was written as an introductory textbook on the Protestant creed for those with some previous knowledge of theology and covered a broad range of theological topics from the doctrines of church and sacraments to justification by faith alone and Christian liberty. It vigorously attacked the teachings of those Calvin considered unorthodox, particularly Roman Catholicism, to which Calvin says he had been "strongly devoted" before his conversion to Protestantism.

The Institutes is a core reference for the system of doctrine adopted by the Reformed churches, usually called Calvinism.

== Background ==
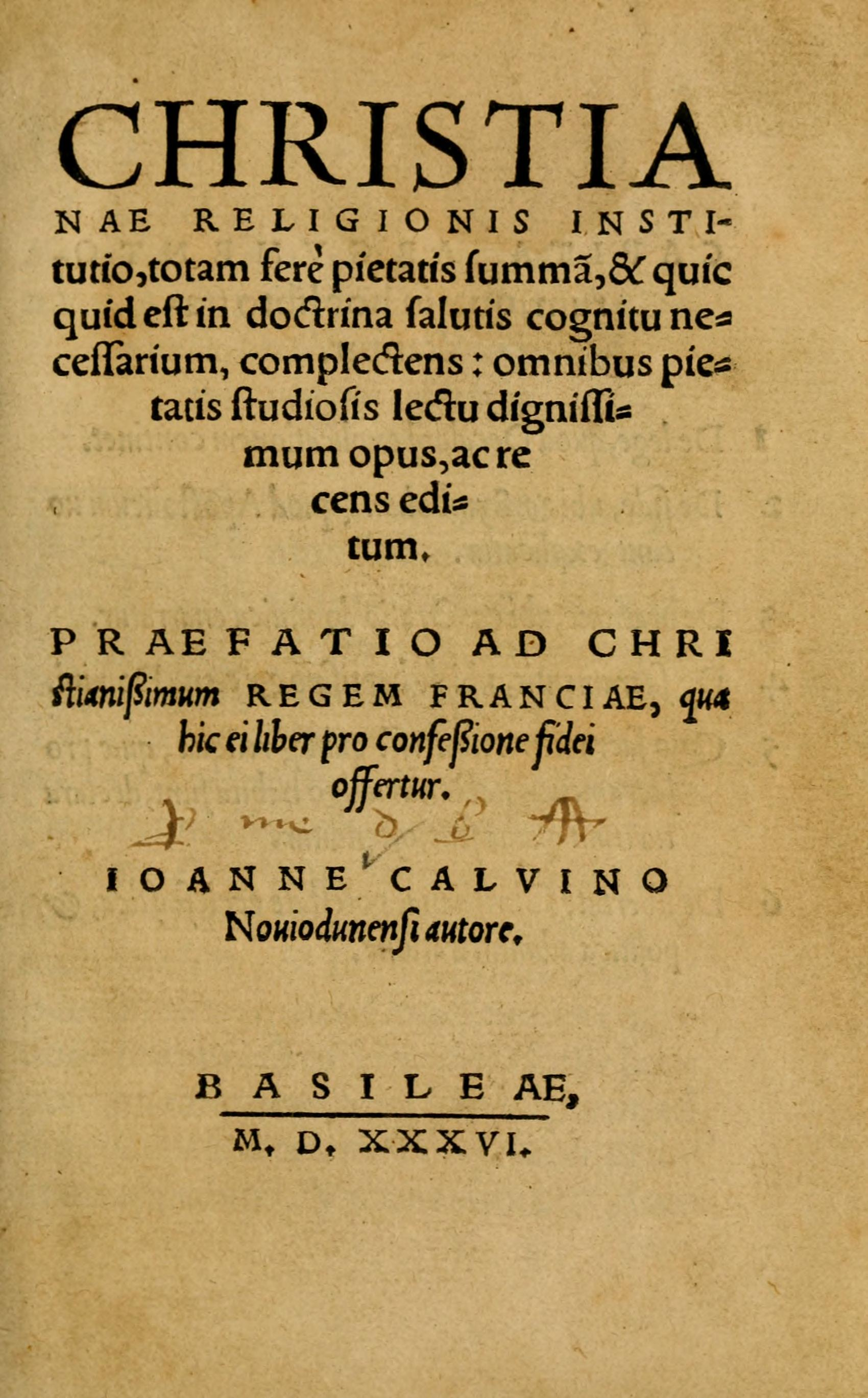
Title page of the first edition (1536, published in Basel

John Calvin was a student of law and then classics at the University of Paris. Around 1533 he became involved in religious controversies and converted to Protestantism, a new Christian reform movement which was persecuted by the Catholic Church in France, forcing him to go into hiding. He moved to Basel, Switzerland for safety in 1535, and around this time he must have begun writing a summary of theology which would become the Institutes. His Catholic opponents sought to tie him and his associates (known as Huguenots in France) to groups of radical Anabaptists, some of which had been put down by persecution. He decided to adapt the work he had been writing to the purpose of defending Protestants suffering from persecution from false accusations that they were espousing radical and heretical doctrines. The work, written in Latin, was published in Basel in March 1536 with a preface addressed to King Francis I of France, entreating him to give the Protestants a hearing rather than continue to persecute them. It is six chapters long, covering the basics of Christian creed using the familiar catechetical structure of the Ten Commandments, the Apostles' Creed, the Lord's Prayer, and the sacraments, as well as a chapter on Christian liberty and political theology. Soon after publishing it, Calvin began his ministry in Geneva, Switzerland.

The Institutes proved instantly popular, with many asking for a revised edition. In 1539, Calvin published a much larger work, with seventeen chapters of about the same length as the six chapters of the first edition. It includes many references to classical authors and Church Fathers, as well as many additional references to the Bible. Calvin's epistle to the reader indicates that the new work is intended for theological students preparing for ministry. Four chapters were added in a third edition in 1543, and a 1550 edition was published with only minor changes. The fifth and final edition with which Calvin was involved, and which is used by scholars as the authoritative text, is 80% larger than the previous edition and was published in Geneva in 1559.

Calvin's theology did not change substantially throughout his life, and so while he expanded and added to the Institutes, he did not change their main ideas.

== Title ==
The Latin word "institutio", translated in the title as "institutes", may also be translated "instruction", as it was in titles of German translations of the work, and was commonly used in the titles of legal works as well as other summary works covering a large body of knowledge. The title of Desiderius Erasmus's Institutio principis Christiani (1516), with which Calvin would have been familiar, is usually translated The Education of a Christian Prince. The form of the short title of the first edition of Calvin's work, published in 1536 is Christianae religionis institutio. The full title of this edition may be translated The Institute of the Christian Religion, Containing almost the Whole Sum of Piety and Whatever It is Necessary to Know in the Doctrine of Salvation. A Work Very Well Worth Reading by All Persons Zealous for Piety, and Lately Published. A Preface to the Most Christian King of France, in Which this Book is Presented to Him as a Confession of Faith. Author, John Calvin, Of Noyon. Basel, MDXXXVI. In the 1539 edition, the title is Institutio Christianae Religionis, possibly to emphasize the fact that this is a new, considerably expanded work. This is followed by "at length truly corresponding to its title", a play on the grandiosity of the title and an indication that the new work better lives up to the expectation created by such a title.

== Contents ==
Institutes in its first form was not merely an exposition of Reformation doctrine; it proved the inspiration to a new form of Christian life for many. It is indebted to Martin Luther in the treatment of faith and sacraments, to Martin Bucer in what is said of divine will and predestination, and to the later scholastics for teaching involving unsuspected implications of freedom in the relation of church and state.

The book is prefaced by a letter to Francis I. As this letter shows, Institutes was composed, or at least completed, to meet a present necessity, to correct an aspersion on Calvin's fellow reformers. The French king, wishing to suppress the Reformation at home, yet unwilling to alienate the reforming princes of Germany, had sought to confound the teachings of the French reformers with the attacks of Anabaptists on civil authority. "My reasons for publishing the Institutes," Calvin wrote in 1557, "were first that I might vindicate from unjust affront my brethren whose death was precious in the sight of the Lord, and next that some sorrow and anxiety should move foreign people, since the same sufferings threaten many." "The hinges on which our controversy turns," says Calvin in his letter to the king, "are that the Church may exist without any apparent form" and that its marks are "pure preaching of the word of God and rightful administration of the sacraments."

Despite the dependence on earlier writers, Institutes was felt by many to be a new voice, and within a year there was demand for a second edition. This came in 1539, amplifying especially the treatment of the fall of man, of election, and of reprobation, as well as that of the authority of scripture. It showed also a more conciliatory temper toward Luther in the section on the Lord's Supper.

The first chapter of the Institutio Christianae Religionis read in the original Latin, with English subtitles

The opening chapter of the Institutes is perhaps the best known, in which Calvin presents the basic plan of the book. There are two general subjects to be examined: the creator and his creatures. Above all, the book concerns the knowledge of God the Creator, but "as it is in the creation of man that the divine perfections are best displayed", there is also an examination of what can be known about mankind. After all, it is mankind's knowledge of God and of what He requires of his creatures that is the primary issue of concern for a book of theology. In the first chapter, these two issues are considered together to show what God has to do with mankind (and other creatures) and, especially, how knowing God is connected with human knowledge.

To pursue an explanation of the relationship between God and man, the edition of 1559, although Calvin claimed it to be "almost a new work", in fact completely recast the old Institutes into four sections and 80 chapters, on the basis of the Apostles' Creed, a traditional structure of Christian instruction used in Western Christianity. First, the knowledge of God is considered as knowledge of the Father, the creator, provider, and sustainer. Next, it is examined how the Son reveals the Father, since only God is able to reveal God. The third section of the Institutes describes the work of the Holy Spirit, who raised Christ from the dead, and who comes from the Father and the Son to affect a union in the Church through faith in Jesus Christ, with God, forever. And finally, the fourth section speaks of the Christian church, and how it is to live out the truths of God and Scriptures, particularly through the sacraments. This section also describes the functions and ministries of the church, how civil government relates to religious matters, and includes a lengthy discussion of the deficiencies of the papacy.

== Translations ==
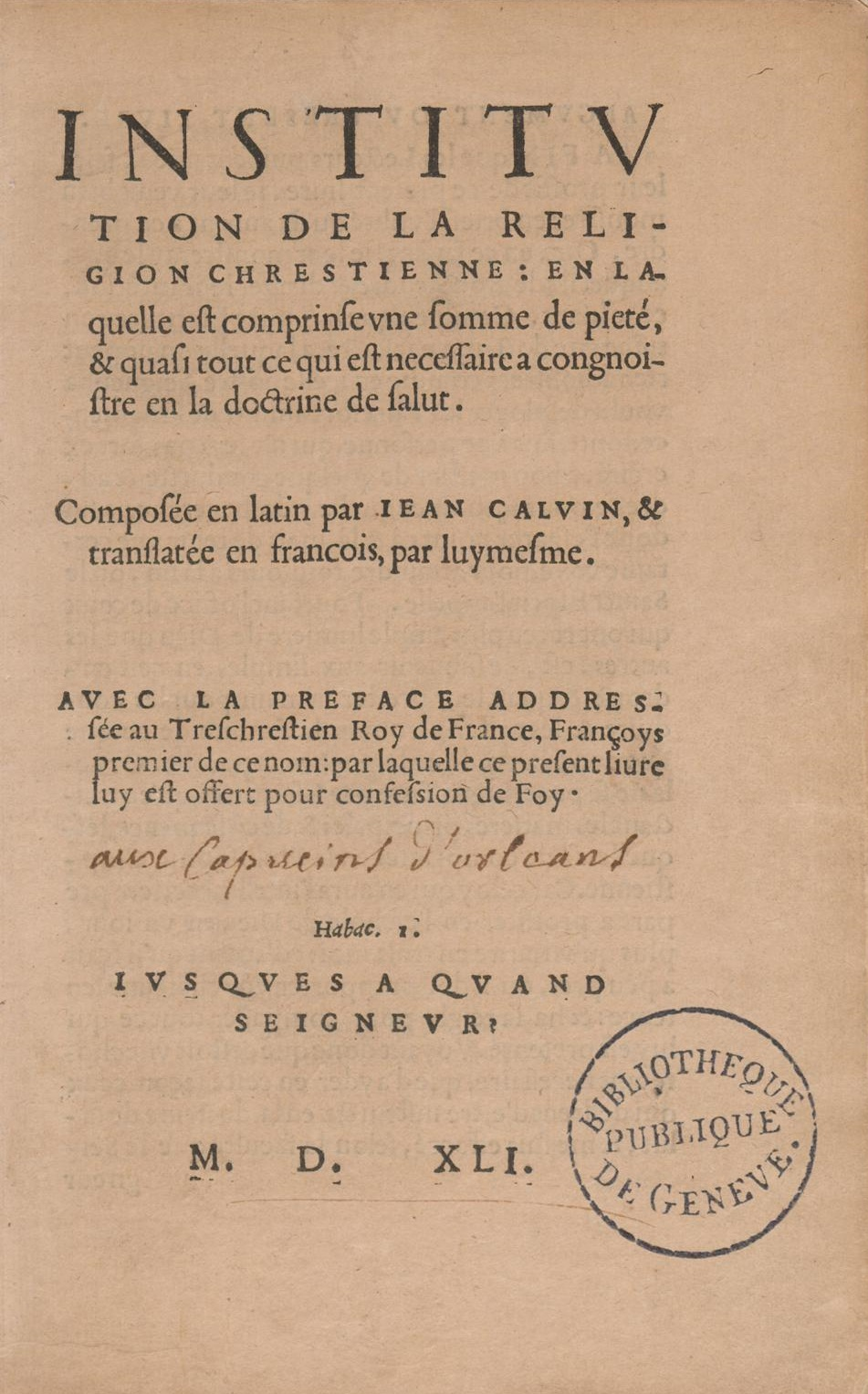
Title page of the first French edition (1541)

There is some speculation that Calvin may have translated the first edition (1536) into French soon after its publication, but the earliest edition which has survived is Calvin's 1541 translation. It was primarily intended for French-speaking Swiss, since very few copies were able to be smuggled into France. Some of these were publicly burned in front of Notre-Dame Cathedral soon after their publication. Calvin published French editions of the Institutes in 1541, 1545, 1551, and 1560. They follow the expansion and development of the Latin editions, but they are not strictly translations, instead being adapted for use by a lay readership, though retaining the same doctrine.

The French translations of Calvin's Institutes helped to shape the French language for generations, not unlike the influence of the King James Version for the English language. There are differences in translations of one of the more famous passages. First, from Calvin's 1560 French edition, Institution, III, 7:

Nous ne sommes point nôtres: que donc notre raison et volonté ne dominent point en nos conseils et en ce que nous avons à faire. Nous ne sommes point nôtres: ne nous établissons donc point cette fin, de chercher ce qui nous est expédient selon la chair. Nous ne sommes point nôtres; oublions-nous donc nous-mêmes tant qu'il sera possible, et tout ce qui est à l'entour de nous. Au contraire, nous sommes au Seigneur: que sa volonté et sa sagresse président en toutes nos actions. Nous sommes au Seigneur: que toutes les parties de notre vie soient référées à lui comme à leur fin unique.

The Institutes were translated into many other European languages. A Spanish translation by Francisco de Enzinas of the 1536 Latin text was published in 1540, before Calvin even published his first French edition. An Italian translation of Calvin's French text was made in 1557. Later translations were of the final 1559 Latin text: Dutch (1560), German (1572), Spanish (1597), Czech (1617), Hungarian (1624), and Japanese (1934). Scholars speculate that the seventeenth-century orientalist Johann Heinrich Hottinger translated it into Arabic, but this has not been confirmed. A complete translation by H. W. Simpson of the 1559 Latin text into Afrikaans was published in four volumes between 1984 and 1992, following an earlier abridged translation by A. Duvenhage in 1951.

In English, five complete translations have been published – four from the Latin and one from the French. The first was made in Calvin's lifetime (1561) by Thomas Norton, the son-in-law of the English Reformer Thomas Cranmer. The Norton translation of the passage above, Institutes, III, 7:

We are not our owne: therefore let neither our owne reason nor our owne will beare rule in our counselles and doinges. We are not our owne: therefore let us not make this the ende for us to tend unto, to seke that which may be expediét for us according to the flesh. We are not our owne: therefore so much as we may, let us foreget our selves and all things that are our owne. On the other side, we are God's: therefore let us live and dye to him.

In the nineteenth century there were two translations, one by John Allen (1813). The same passage in the Allen translation, Institutes, III, 7:

We are not our own; therefore neither our reason nor our will should predominate in our deliberations and actions. We are not our own; therefore let us not propose it as our end, to seek what may be expedient for us according to the flesh. We are not our own; therefore, let us, as far as possible, forget ourselves and all things that are ours. On the contrary, we are God's; to him, therefore, let us live and die.

Also from the nineteenth century, the Henry Beveridge (1845) translation, Institutes, III, 7:

We are not our own; therefore, neither is our own reason or will to rule our acts and counsels. We are not our own; therefore, let us not make it our end to seek what may be agreeable to our carnal nature. We are not our own; therefore, as far as possible, let us forget ourselves and the things that are ours. On the other hand, we are God's; let us, therefore, live and die to him.

The most recent from Latin is the 1960 edition, translated by Ford Lewis Battles and edited by John T. McNeill, currently considered the most authoritative edition by scholars. The Battles translation of the same passage, Institutes, III, 7:

We are not our own: let not our reason nor our will, therefore, sway our plans and deeds. We are not our own: let us therefore not set it as our goal to seek what is expedient for us according to the flesh. We are not our own: in so far as we can, let us therefore forget ourselves and all that is ours. Conversely, we are God's: let us therefore live for him and die for him.

— Jean Calvin, Institutes of the Christian Religion

Calvin's first French edition (1541) has been translated by Elsie Anne McKee (2009) and by Robert White (2014). Due to the length of the Institutes, several abridged versions have been made. The most recent is by Tony Lane and Hilary Osborne; the text is their own alteration and abridgment of the Beveridge translation.

== Legacy ==
The Institutes overshadowed the earlier Protestant theologies such as Melanchthon's Loci Communes and Zwingli's Commentary on the True and False Religion. According to historian Philip Schaff, it is a classic of theology at the level of Origen's On First Principles, Augustine's The City of God, Thomas Aquinas's Summa Theologica, and Schleiermacher's The Christian Faith. (Schaff himself was an adherent of Reformed Christianity, which traces its roots to John Calvin.)

== List of editions ==
=== Latin ===
- Calvino, Ioanne (1536). Christianae religionis institutio, totam fere pietatis summam, & quicquid est in doctrina salutis cognitu necessarium: complectens: omnibus pietatis studiosis lectu dignissimum opus, ac recens editum: Praefatio ad Christianissimum regem Franciae, qua hic ei liber pro confessione fidei offertur (in Latin). Basel, Switzerland: Thomam Platteru & Balthasarem Lasium.
- ——— (1539). Institutio Christianae Religionis Nunc vere demum suo titulo respondens (in Latin) (2nd ed.). Strassburg: Wendelinum Rihelium.
- ——— (1543). Institutio Christianae Religionis Nunc vere demum suo titulo respondens (in Latin) (3rd ed.). Strassburg: Wendelinum Rihelium.
- ——— (1550). Institutio totius christianae religionis, nunc ex postrema authoris recognitione, quibusdam locis auctior, infinitis vero castigatior. Joanne Calvino authore. Additi sunt indices duo locupletissimi (in Latin) (4th ed.). Genève, Switzerland: Jean Girard.
- ——— (1559). Institutio christianae religionis, in libros quatuor nunc primum digesta, certisque distincta capitibus, ad aptissimam methodum: aucta etiam tam magna accessione ut propemodum opus novum haberi possit (in Latin) (5th ed.). Genevae, Switzerland: Robert I. Estienne.

=== French ===
- Calvin, Jean (1541). Institution de la religion chrestienne: en laquelle est comprinse une somme de pieté, et quasi tout ce qui est necessaire a congnoistre en la doctrine de salut [Institution of the Christian Religion: in which is comprised a summary of piety, and almost all that is necessary to know in the doctrine of salvation] (in French). Genève, Switzerland: Michel Du Bois.
- ——— (1545). Institution de la religion chrestienne: composée en latin par Jehan Calvin, et translatée en francoys par luymesme: en laquelle est comprise une somme de toute la chrestienté [Institution of the Christian Religion: composed in Latin by John Calvin, and translated into French by himself: in which is comprised a summary of all Christianity] (in French). Genève, Switzerland: Jean Girard.
- ——— (1551). Institution de la religion chrestienne: composée en latin par Jean Calvin, et translatée en françoys par luymesme, et puis de nouveau reveuë et augmentée: en laquelle est comprinse une somme de toute la chrestienté [Institution of the Christian Religion: composed in Latin by John Calvin, and translated into French by himself, and again revised & augmented: in which is comprised a summary of all Christianity] (in French). Genève, Switzerland: Jean Girard.
- ——— (1553). Institution de la religion chrestienne: composée en latin par Jean Calvin, et translatée en françoys par luymesme, et encores de nouveau reveuë et augmentée: en laquelle est comprinse une somme de toute la chrestienté [Institution of the Christian Religion: composed in Latin by John Calvin, and translated into French by himself, and yet again revised & augmented: in which is comprised a summary of all Christianity] (in French). Genève, Switzerland: Jean Girard.
- ——— (1554). Institution de la religion chrestienne: composée en latin par Jean Calvin, et translatée en françoys par luymesme, et encores de nouveau reveuë et augmentée: en laquelle est comprinse une somme de toute la chrestienté [Institution of the Christian Religion: composed in Latin by John Calvin, and translated into French by himself, and again revised & augmented: in which is comprised a summary of all Christianity] (in French). Genève, Switzerland: Philbert Hamelin.
- ——— (1560). Institution de la religion chrestienne [Institution of the Christian Religion] (in French). Genève, Switzerland: Jean Crespin.

=== German ===
- Calvin, Iohann (1572) [1572]. Institutio Christianae Religionis, Das ist/Underweisung inn Christlicher Religion. Heydelberg, Germany: Johannes Meyer.
- Unterricht in der christlichen Religion – Institutio Christianae Religionis, Institutes of the Christian Religion based on the last (1559) edition translated and edited by Otto Weber, edited and reissued by Matthias Freudenberg. 2nd edition, Neukirchener Verlag (publisher) located in Neukirchen-Vluyn, Germany, released in 2008. ISBN 978-3-7887-2327-9

=== Italian ===
- Calvino, Giovanni (1557). Institutione della religion christiana di messer Giovanni Calvino, in volgare italiano tradotta per Giulio Cesare P [Institutes of the Christian Religion by master John Calvin, translated into vulgar Italian by Giulio Cesare P] (in Italian). Translated by Giulio Cesare Paschali. Genève, Switzerland: François Jaquy, Antoine Davodeau & Jacques Bourgeois.

=== Korean ===
- 칼빈, 존(2003)[1559]. 기독교 강요: 크리스찬 다이제스트, Korea, 원광연 옮김 ISBN 89-447-0045-1.
- 칼빈, 존(2020)[1559]. 기독교 강요: 생명의 말씀사, Korea, 문병호 옮김 ISBN 89-04-700604.

=== Spanish ===
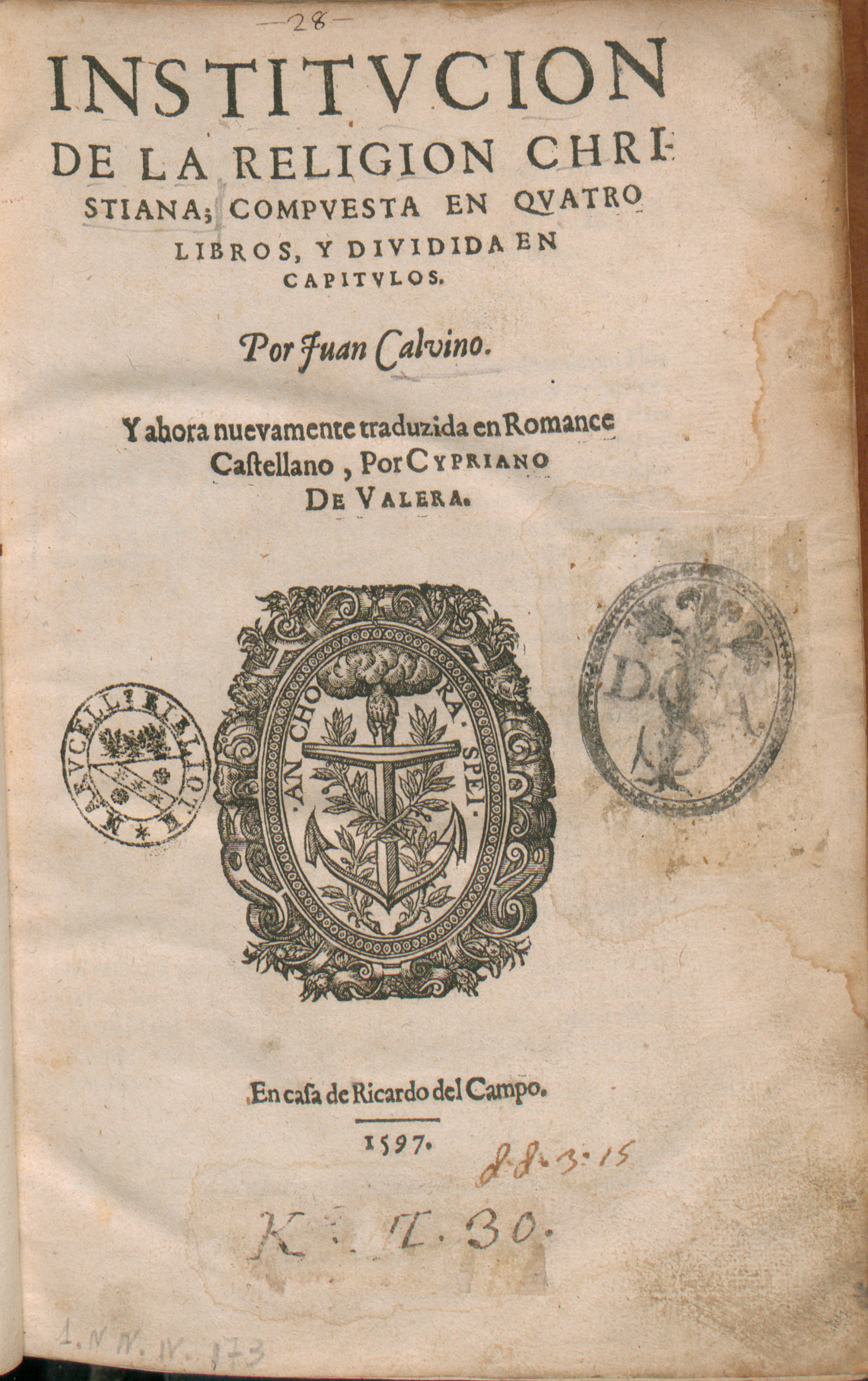
Institutio christianae religionis, 1597

- Institucion de la religion Cristiana, 1597, translation by Cipriano de Valera.

=== Czech ===
- Zpráva a vysvětlení náboženství křesťanského, ca. 1615, translation by Jiří Strejc.

=== English ===
- Caluin, Ihon (6 May 1561) [1559]. The Institvtion of Christian Religion, VVrytten in Latine by Maister Ihon Caluin, and Translated into Englysh according to the Authors Last Edition. Translated by Thomas Norton. London, England: Reinolde Vvolfe & Richarde Harison.
- Calvin, John (1813). Institutes of the Christian Religion. Vol. 1. Translated by John Allen. Philadelphia, Pennsylvania: Presbyterian Board of Publication.
  - ——— (1813). Institutes of the Christian Religion. Vol. 2. Translated by John Allen. Philadelphia, Pennsylvania: Presbyterian Board of Publication.
- ——— (1845). Institutes of the Christian Religion; a New Translation by Henry Beveridge. Vol. 1. Translated by Henry Beveridge. Edinburgh, Scotland: Calvin Translation Society.
  - ——— (1845). Institutes of the Christian Religion; a New Translation by Henry Beveridge. Vol. 2. Translated by Henry Beveridge. Edinburgh, Scotland: Calvin Translation Society.
  - ——— (1845). Institutes of the Christian Religion; a New Translation by Henry Beveridge. Vol. 3. Translated by Henry Beveridge. Edinburgh, Scotland: Calvin Translation Society.
- ——— (1960) [1559]. Institutes of the Christian Religion: in Two Volumes. Translated by Ford Lewis Battles. Philadelphia, Pennsylvania: Westminster Press. ISBN 978-0-66422028-0.
- ——— (1959) [1536]. Institutes of the Christian Religion. Translated by Ford Lewis Battles (1536 ed.). Grand Rapids, Michigan: Wm. B. Eerdmans Publishing Co. ISBN 978-0-80284167-4.
- ——— (2009) [1541]. Institutes of the Christian Religion. Translated by Elsie Anne McKee (1541 French ed.). Grand Rapids, Michigan: Wm. B. Eerdmans Publishing Co. ISBN 978-0-80280774-8.
- ——— (2014) [1541]. Institutes of the Christian Religion. Translated by Robert White (1541 French ed.). Carlisle, Pennsylvania: Banner of Truth. ISBN 978-1-84871-463-2.

=== Afrikaans ===
- Calvyn, Johannes (1984) [1559]. Institusie van die Christelike Godsdiens. Vol. 1. Translated by HW Simpson (1559 Latin ed.). Potchefstroom: Calvyn Jubileum Boekefonds. ISBN 0-86990-746-8.
  - ——— (1986) [1559]. Institusie van die Christelike Godsdiens. Vol. 2. Translated by HW Simpson (1559 Latin ed.). Potchefstroom: Calvyn Jubileum Boekefonds. ISBN 0-86990-860-X.
  - ——— (1988) [1559]. Institusie van die Christelike Godsdiens. Vol. 3. Translated by HW Simpson (1559 Latin ed.). Potchefstroom: Calvyn Jubileum Boekefonds. ISBN 0-86955-064-0.
  - ——— (1992) [1559]. Institusie van die Christelike Godsdiens. Vol. 4. Translated by HW Simpson (1559 Latin ed.). Potchefstroom: Calvyn Jubileum Boekefonds. ISBN 0-86955-106-X.

=== Polish ===
No full translation has been made to Polish. However, four important pieces were published:

- O zwierzchności świeckiej, porządne, według sznuru Pisma Świętego opisanie. Zaraz o pożytkach i powinnościach urzędu jej. Z łacinskiego wiernie przetłumaczone, a 1599 anonymous translation of Chapter XX of Book IV. It was reissued in 2005.
- Nauka o sakramenciech świętych Nowego testamentu. Wzięta z czwartych ksiąg Instytucji nabożeństwa krześcijańskiego Jana Kalwina, y na polskie wiernie przetłumaczone a 1626 translation by Piotr Siestrzencewicz of Chapters XIV to XIX of Book IV. Published in Lubecz and dedicated to Duke Janusz Radziwiłł. The edition is extremely rare with three copies known to have survived.
- Book 4, Chapter 19, translated by Rafał Leszczyński sr, in the volume by Rafał Marcin Leszczyński, entitled: Jan Kalwin. Studia nad myślą Reformatora, ed. Jednota, Warszawa 2017, in the annex, pp. 183–219, 220–222.
- Istota religii chrześcijańskiej, księga 1 a 2020, by Towarzystwo Upowszechniania Myśli Reformowanej HORN, Świętochłowice, translation from Latin by Janusz Kucharczyk, Rafał Leszczyński sr, Piotr Wietrzykowski, Przemysław Gola (part of the Letter to the King) and Alina Lotz (differences from the French version). All books will be published.
- Istota religii chrześcijańskiej, księga 2 a December 2021, by Towarzystwo Upowszechniania Myśli Reformowanej HORN, translation from Latin by Janusz Kucharczyk and Rafał Leszczyński sr and Alina Lotz (differences from the French version). All books will be published.

=== Chinese ===
- 加尔文, 约翰 (2010) [1559]. 孙毅, 游冠辉 (ed.). 基督教要义 = Institutes of the Christian religion. Vol. 1. Translated by 钱曜诚 等 (1960 English ed.). Beijing: 三联书店. ISBN 978-7-10803-370-3.

== See also ==
- John Calvin bibliography
- Ford Lewis Battles
