= Bibliology =

Branch of systematic theology that deals with the Bible

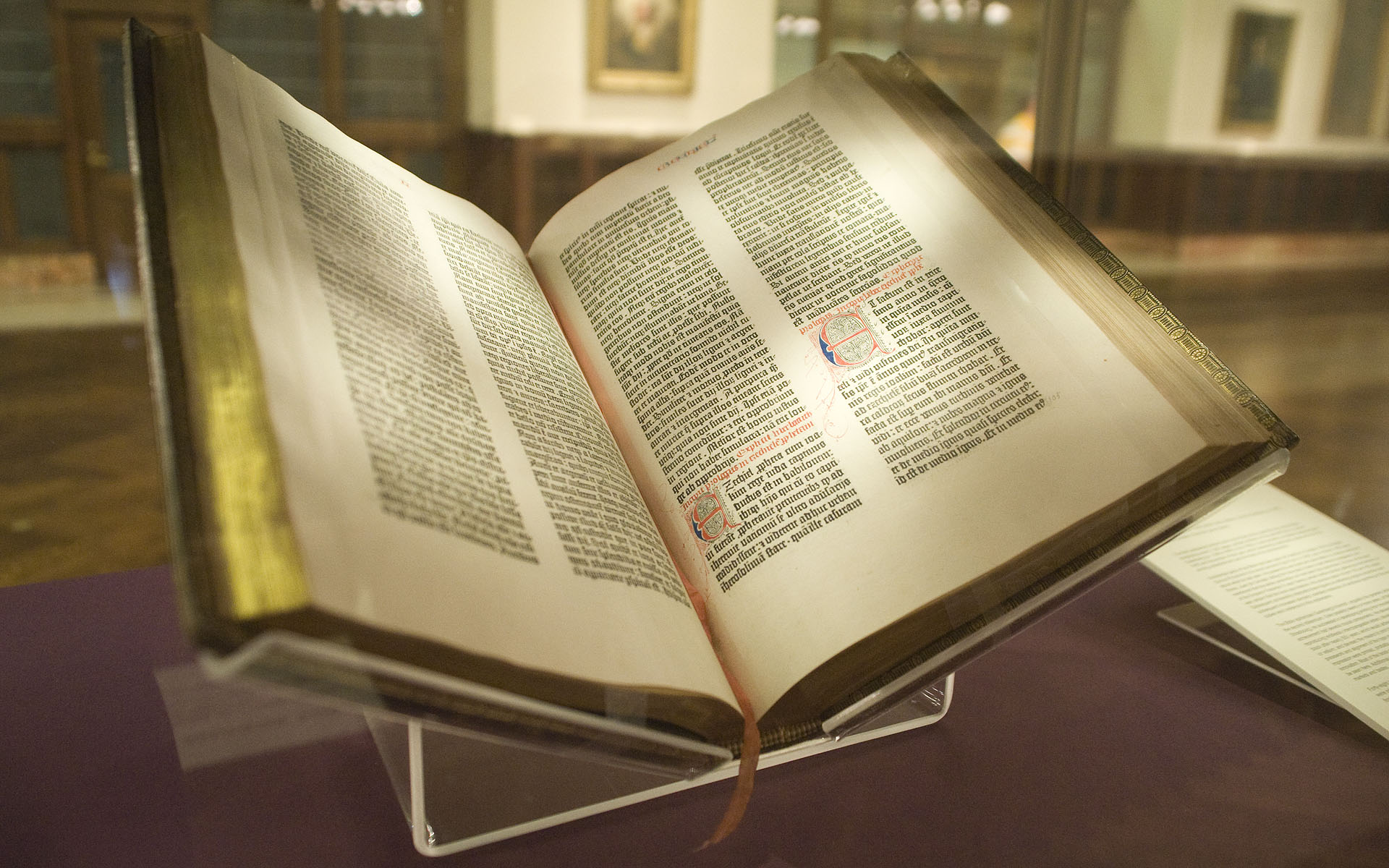
Gutenberg Bible, ca. 1455

Bibliology, also known as the Doctrine of Scripture, is a branch of systematic theology that deals with the nature, character, and authority of the Bible.

== Issues ==
The Doctrine of Scripture includes several key issues. The most basic issue is how Scripture's divine and human authors relate to one another. The inspiration of Scripture may entail that Scripture is infallible and even inerrant. Another set of concerns is whether the Bible is clear. The perspicuity or clarity of Scripture is the extent to which the Bible can be understood. Finally, the degree to which the Bible is authoritative for Christian life and doctrine is called the Sufficiency of Scripture. The Bible is either the only source of authority (Sola scriptura) or the highest of several related sources of authority (Prima scriptura), or one authority among equals.

== Roman Catholic views ==
The Second Vatican Council published the document Dei Verbum to summarize the Roman Catholic view of Scripture. According to the Council, the Biblical authors were inspired by God to write their texts, so that while their writing is human, they also teach "solidly, faithfully and without error that truth which God wanted put into sacred writings for the sake of salvation." However, because the writers are humans, living in certain times and places and speaking certain languages, readers of Scripture need to "carefully investigate what meaning the sacred writers really intended, and what God wanted to manifest by means of their words" by looking at ancient literary forms, styles, and customs. Scripture must also be interpreted in the context of the entirety of Scripture, and the entirety of the "living tradition of the Church." Finally, Dei Verbum connects the human and divine authorship of Scripture using an analogy with Christ' incarnation: God's "eternal wisdom" has "condescended" to human form by the human authors: "the words of God, expressed in human language, have been made like human discourse, just as the word of the eternal Father, when He took to Himself the flesh of human weakness, was in every way made like men."

The Catechism of the Catholic Church reiterates the teaching in Dei Verbum that the Bible is written by both God and humans and so is inspired and true. The Catechism also adds that "Christian faith is not a "religion of the book"" because the meaning of Scripture requires illumination by the Spirit. Most recently, Pope Benedict XVI expounded the Roman Catholic view of Scripture in a document titled Verbum Domini.

== Eastern Orthodox views ==
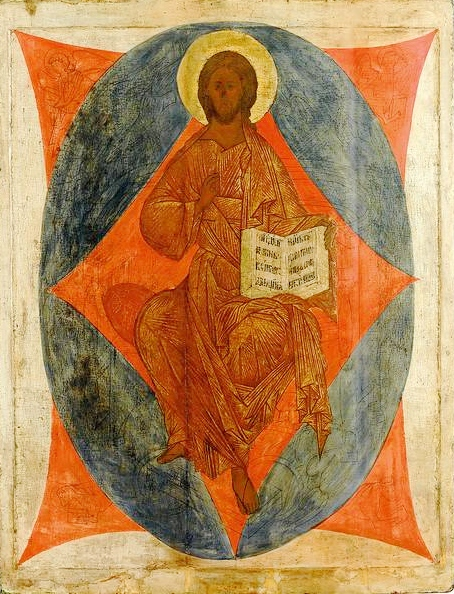
Christ Pantocrator with open Bible

According to the Orthodox Church of America (an Eastern Orthodox church), the Bible was written by humans and so contains "all of the marks of the men who wrote them, and of the time and the culture in which they were written. Nevertheless, in the full integrity of their human condition and form, the words of the Bible are truly the very Word of God." The OCA takes a moderate position on inerrancy, writing that the Bible "contains no formal errors or inner contradictions concerning the relationship between God and the world. There may be incidental inaccuracies of a non-essential character in the Bible. But the eternal spiritual and doctrinal message of God, presented in the Bible in many different ways, remains perfectly consistent, authentic, and true."

Another group, the Greek Orthodox Archdiocese of America, highly values the Bible and writes that while "the Bible is treasured as a valuable written record of God's revelation, it does not contain wholly that revelation. The Bible is viewed as only one expression of God's revelation in the ongoing life of His people. Scripture is part of the treasure of Faith which is known as Tradition." In this view, the Bible, the Creeds, and the Councils are all mutually interpreting, guarded by the Church and illuminated by the Spirit of God.

== Conservative Protestant views ==
Conservative Protestants and Liberal Protestants diverged during the fundamentalist–modernist controversy over topics related to the truthfulness and authority of Scripture. It became important to conservatives in the wake of the controversy to stress the total inerrancy of Scripture. For example, in 1932 the Lutheran Church Missouri Synod wrote that the Scriptures are the Word of God and therefore "contain no errors or contradictions, but that they are in all their parts and words the infallible truth, also in those parts which treat of historical, geographical, and other secular matters." According to the same document, the view that the Bible might contain an error is "horrible and blasphemous" and "overthrows the foundation" of Christianity. In 1978 a group of Evangelical scholars published the Chicago Statement on Biblical Inerrancy. Its authors maintain that the Bible is "wholly and verbally God-given, Scripture is without error or fault in all its teaching, no less in what it states about God’s acts in creation, about the events of world history, and about its own literary origins under God, than in its witness to God’s saving grace in individual lives."

== Liberal Protestant views ==
Liberal Protestants tend to see Scripture as one source among several (others being tradition, reason, history, and experience). For example, the Episcopal Church believes that the Bible, "understood through tradition and reason," is the foundation of the faith. Meanwhile a document from the Presbyterian Church (USA) lists a variety of views that its members hold. This document then highlights what is at stake in these disagreements: whether Scripture governs "every possible issue or truth" or is limited to non-scientific truths (or other limits), and how to rightly interpret the Bible and make judgements for today based on that interpretation. Finally, the Protestant Church in Germany, as a composite denomination, has no single view on the Bible but writes that church "have the task of studying further these differences of doctrine" including "hermeneutical questions concerning the understanding of Scripture, confession of faith, and Church."

== See also ==
- Biblical inerrancy
- Catholic theology of Scripture
- John Calvin's view of Scripture
