= John Calvin bibliography =

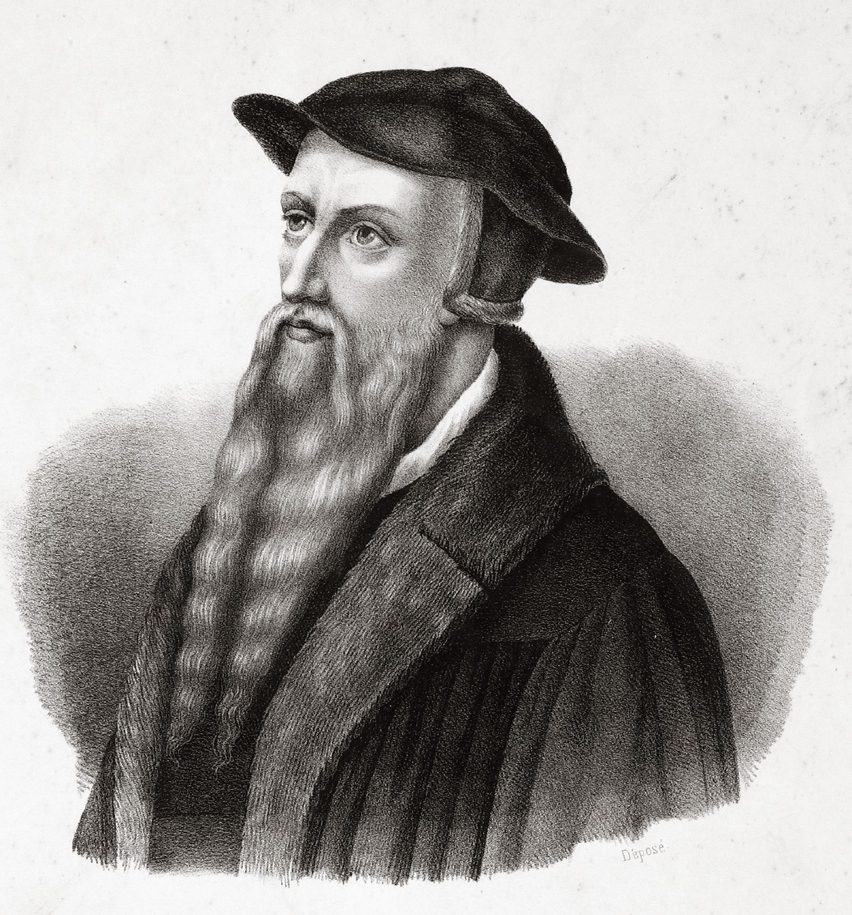
Lithograph of John Calvin

The French Reformer John Calvin (1509–1564) was a theological writer who produced many sermons, biblical commentaries, letters, theological treatises, and other works. Although nearly all of Calvin's adult life was spent in Geneva, Switzerland (1536–1538 and 1541–1564), his publications spread his ideas of a properly reformed church to many parts of Europe and from there to the rest of the world. It is especially on account of his voluminous publications that he exerts such a lasting influence over Christianity and Western history.

Calvin's first published work was an edition of the Roman philosopher Seneca's De Clementia, accompanied by a commentary demonstrating a thorough knowledge of antiquity. His first theological work, the Psychopannychia, attempted to refute the doctrine of soul sleep as promulgated by Christians whom Calvin called "Anabaptists." He finished it in 1534 but, on the advice of friends, didn't publish it until 1542. The work demonstrates that since his conversion, Calvin had undertaken serious study and now showed a mastery of the Bible, and he had become, using Karl Barth's words, a "theological Humanist" and a "biblicist"—that is, "no matter how true a teaching might be, he was not ready to lend an ear to it apart from the Word of God."

At the age of twenty-six, Calvin published the first edition of his Institutes of the Christian Religion (Latin title: Institutio Christianae Religionis), a seminal work in Christian theology that is still read by theological students today. It was published in Latin in 1536 and in his native French in 1541, with the definitive editions appearing in 1559 (Latin) and in 1560 (French). The book was written as an introductory textbook on the Protestant faith for those with some learning already and covered a broad range of theological topics from the doctrines of church and sacraments to justification by faith alone and Christian liberty, and it vigorously attacked the teachings of those Calvin considered unorthodox, particularly Roman Catholicism to which Calvin says he had been "strongly devoted" before his conversion to Protestantism. The overarching theme of the book – and Calvin's greatest theological legacy – is the idea of God's total sovereignty, particularly in salvation and election.

Calvin also produced many volumes of commentary on most of the books of the Bible. For the Old Testament, he published commentaries for all books except the histories after Joshua (though he did publish his sermons on First Samuel) and the Wisdom literature other than the Book of Psalms. For the New Testament, he omitted only the brief second and third Epistles of John and the Book of Revelation. These commentaries, too, have proved to be of lasting value to students of the Bible, and they remain in print after over 400 years.

Calvin also wrote more than 1,300 letters on a wide range of topics.

== Institutes of the Christian Religion ==
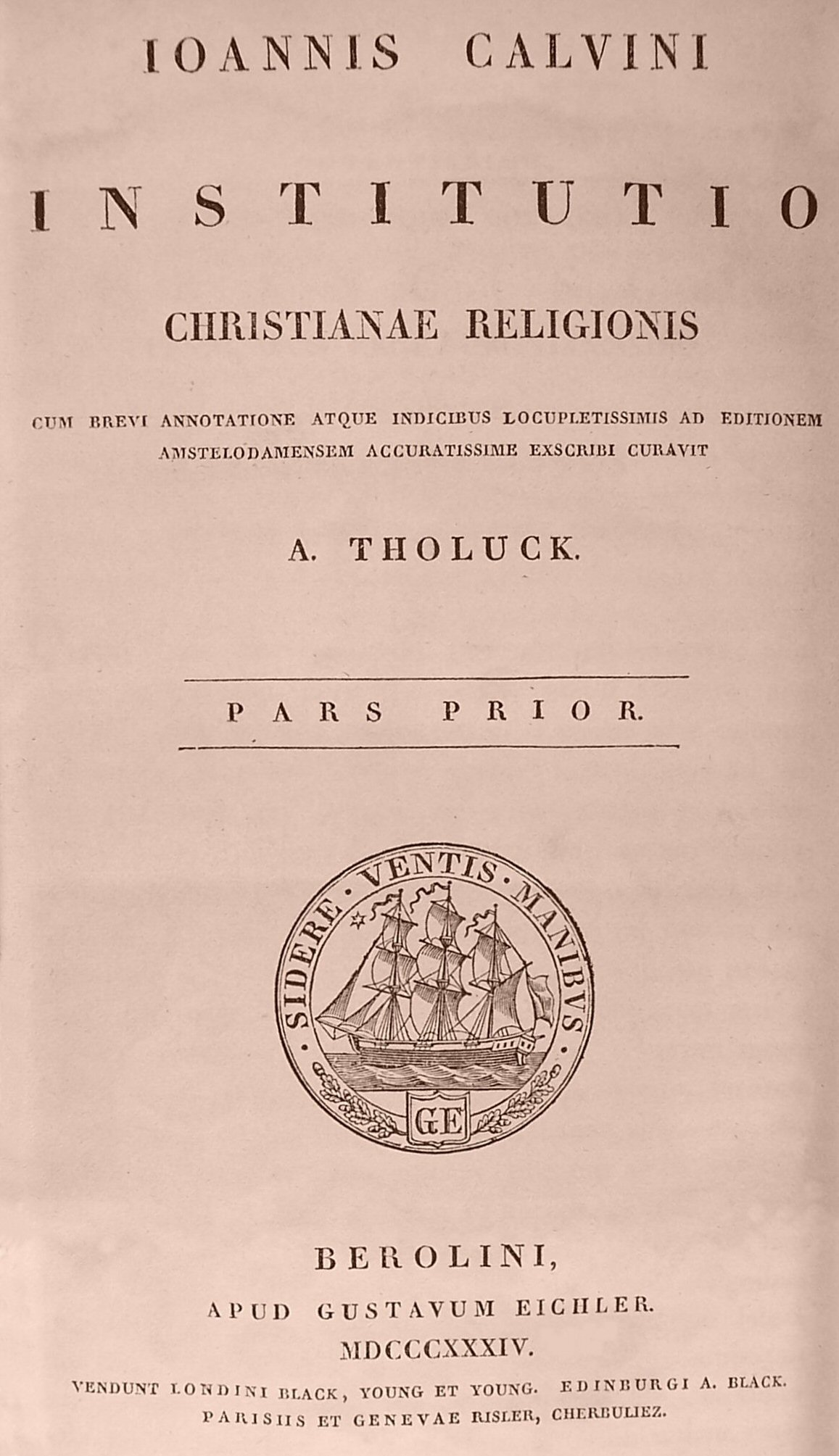
The title page from the 1834 edition of John Calvin's Institutio Christiane Religionis

Calvin developed his theology, the most enduring component of his thought, in his biblical commentaries as well as his sermons and treatises, and he gave the most concise expression of his views on Christian theology in his magnum opus, the Institutes of the Christian Religion. The various editions of that work span nearly his entire career as a reformer, and the successive revisions of the book show that his theology changed very little from his youth to his death. The first edition from 1536 consisted of six chapters. The second edition, published in 1539, was three times as long because he added chapters on subjects that appear in Melanchthon's Loci Communes. In 1543, he again added new material and expanded a chapter on the Apostles' Creed. The final edition of the Institutes appeared in 1559. By then, the work consisted of four books of eighty chapters, and each book was named after statements from the creed: Book 1 on God the Creator, Book 2 on the Redeemer in Christ, Book 3 on receiving the Grace of Christ through the Holy Spirit, and Book 4 on the Society of Christ or the Church.

== Commentaries ==
Calvin produced commentaries on most of the books of the Bible. His first commentary on Romans was published in 1540, and he planned to write commentaries on the entire New Testament. However, it took six years before he wrote his second, a commentary on I Corinthians. Within four years he had published commentaries on all the Pauline epistles, and he also revised the commentary on Romans. He then turned his attention on the general epistles, dedicating them to the English King Edward VI. By 1555 he had completed his work on the New Testament, finishing with the Acts and the Gospels (he did omit the brief second and third Epistles of John and the Book of Revelation).

For the Old Testament, he wrote commentaries on Isaiah, the books of the Pentateuch, the Psalms, and Joshua. The material for the commentaries often originated from lectures to students and ministers that he would re-work for publication. However, from 1557 onwards, he could not find the time to continue this method, and he gave permission for his lectures to be published from stenographers' notes. These Praelectiones covered the minor prophets, Daniel, Jeremiah, Lamentations, and part of Ezekiel.

In the controversial matter of interpreting prophecy such as that in the Book of Daniel, Calvin proposed a preterist view, which is to say that he believed that the prophecies in the book of Daniel apply only to the history between prophet Daniel (530 BC) and Jesus' first coming (30 AD). In this view he was out of line with the early church and the Reformers who came before him, who maintained more fully to historical-continuous view. Calvin is also in distinction to many of his later successors who took a future fulfillment interpretation.

Dutch theologian Jacobus Arminius, after whom the anti-Calvinistic movement Arminianism was named, says with regard to the value of Calvin's writings:

Next to the study of the Scriptures which I earnestly inculcate, I exhort my pupils to peruse Calvin’s Commentaries, which I extol in loftier terms than Helmich himself (a Dutch divine, 1551–1608); for I affirm that he excels beyond comparison in the interpretation of Scripture, and that his commentaries ought to be more highly valued than all that is handed down to us by the library of the fathers; so that I acknowledge him to have possessed above most others, or rather above all other men, what may be called an eminent spirit of prophecy. His Institutes ought to be studied after the (Heidelberg) Catechism, as containing a fuller explanation, but with discrimination, like the writings of all men.

== Letters ==
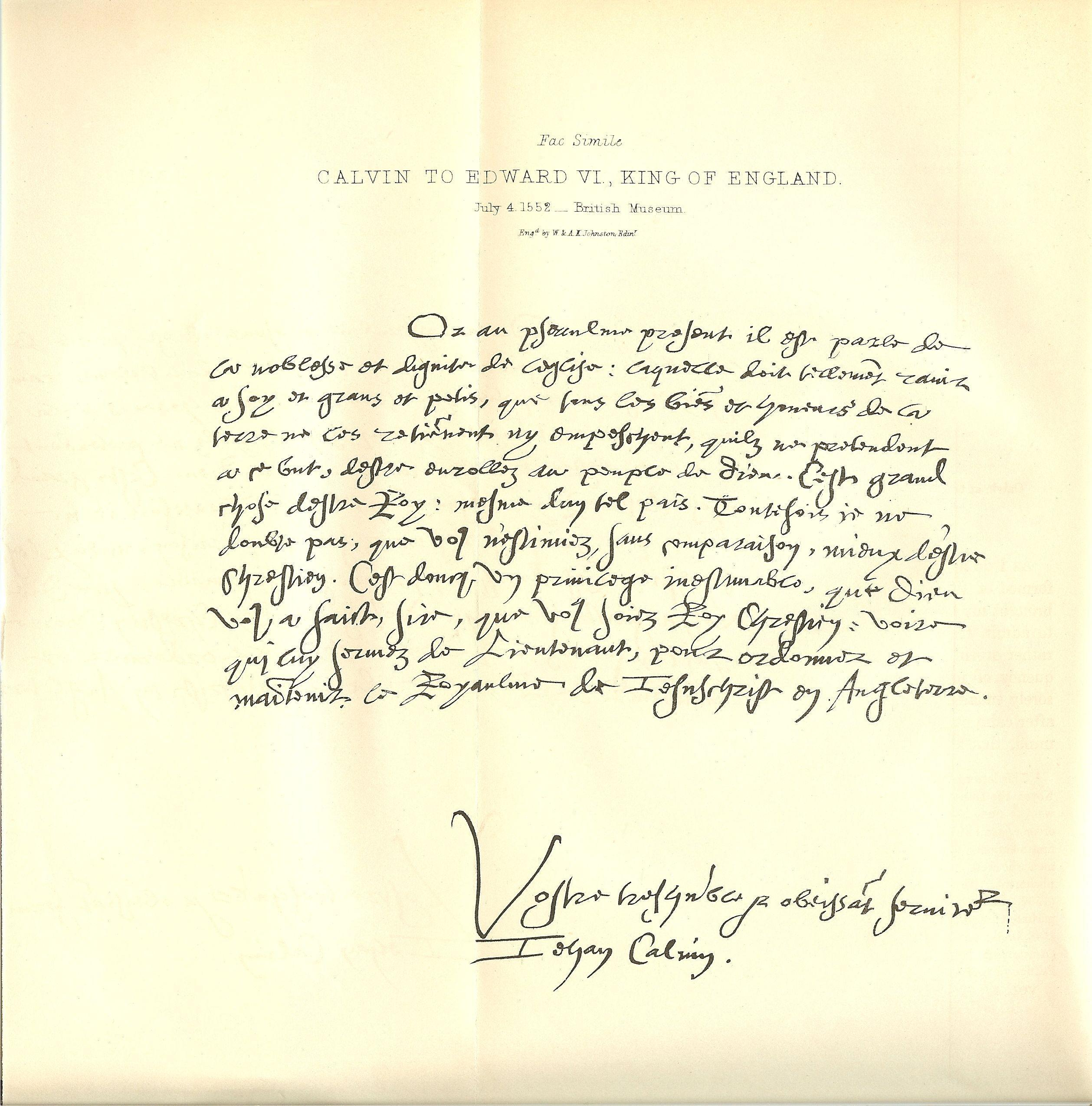
Letter of Calvin to King Edward VI, July 4, 1552 – British Museum

Calvin's body of letters has not received the wide readership of the Institutes and bible commentaries since his correspondence obviously addressed the particular needs and occasions of his day. Even so, the scale of his letter writing was just as prodigious as his better-known works: his letters number some 1,300, and, along with some 3,000 letters written to him, fill eleven of Calvin's fifty-nine volumes in the Corpus Reformatorum. B. B. Warfield calls Calvin "the great letter-writer of the Reformation age."

His letters, often written under the pseudonym Charles d'Espeville, concern issues ranging from disputes about local theater to raising support for fledgling churches to choosing sides in a political alliance. They also reveal personal qualities that are not evident in his exegetical prose. One example came after the massacre of the Waldensians of Provence in 1545 where 3,600 were slaughtered. Calvin was so dismayed that in a space of twenty-one days he visited Berne, Aurich, Schaffhausen, Basle, and Strasbourg, before addressing the deputies of the Cantons at the Diet of Arau, pleading everywhere for an intercession on behalf of those who survived. He wrote of his grief to William Farel:

Such was the savage cruelty of the persecutors, that neither young girls, nor pregnant women, nor infants were spared. So great is the atrocious cruelty of this proceeding, that I grow bewildered when I reflect upon it. How, then, shall I express it in words? ... I write, worn out with sadness, and not without tears, which so burst forth, that every now and then they interrupt my words.

One of Calvin's better known letters was his reply to Jacopo Sadoleto's "Letter to the Genevans," and this "Reformation Debate" remains in print today.

== Sermons ==
- Sermons on I Samuel
- Sermons on Galatians
- Sermons on Psalm 119
- Sermons on the deity of Christ
- Sermons on Election and Reprobation (Genesis)

== Theological treatises ==
- Psychopannychia
- Treatise on Relics
- The Secret Providence of God
- A Short Treatise on the Lord's Supper was written in French in 1540 and clarified various Eucharistic issues for the Protestants. Given that it was written in French, it was less accessible to the scholastic readers of the time that read Latin. Martin Luther found a copy of the book in Latin in a bookstore later in his life and commented that he could have "entrusted the whole controversy" of the Last Supper to Calvin from the beginning.

== Other works ==
- Commentary on Seneca the Younger's De Clementia
- On Civil Authority
