= Henry Beveridge (historian) =

- Born: 1799; Scotland
- Died: 1863 (aged 63–64)
- Occupation(s): Lawyer, Translator and Historian
- Children: Henry Beveridge (1837–1929)

Henry Beveridge (1799–1863) was a Scottish lawyer, translator and historian.

The Calvin Translation Society founded in May 1843 in Edinburgh. It published (1844–1855) translations of Calvin's books: Institutes of the Christian Religion, Commentaries, Tracts and Letters. Beveridge translated for the Calvin Translation Society included a collection of Calvin's Tracts Relating to the Reformation, three volumes in 1844 and he translated Institutes of the Christian Religion in 1845. His edition of the Institutes of the Christian Religion came out in three volumes, and contained in the introductory matter items that have been, not with-out loss, dropped out of later printings in both America and Britain. Beveridge had intended to enter the ministry; he later trained for the law and became a lawyer, but made writing his chief employment. He was engaged by the publishers Blackie and Son to write a A Comprehensive History of India, which he produced in three volumes (1858–63), without leaving British shore; the book was printed in London and in New Delhi.

== Works ==
- A Comprehensive History Of India, Vol. 1
- A Comprehensive History Of India, Vol. 2
- A Comprehensive History Of India, Vol. 3

Translations Works

- Calvin's Tracts. vol. I
- Calvin's Tracts. vol. II.
- Calvin's Tracts. vol. III.
- Institutes of the Christian Religion by Calvin, Jean/ Volume 1.
- Institutes of the Christian Religion by Calvin, Jean/ Volume 2
