= John Allen (religious writer) =

John Allen (1771–1839) was an English dissenting layman and religious writer.

== Life and work ==
Allen was born at Truro in 1771 and educated there by a Dr Cardue. He afterwards kept an academy, the Madras House grammar school, for 30 years in Hackney, where he died on 17 June 1839.

Allen's major work, first published in 1816, was Modern Judaism; or a Brief Account of the Opinions, Traditions, Rites, and Ceremonies of the Jews in Modern Times (i. e. since the Christian era). It was reprinted in 1830. He also published:

- The Fathers, the Reformers, and the Public Formularies of the Church of England in Harmony with Calvin and against the Bishop of Lincoln (1812 anonymously)
- Memoirs of Major-General Burn, 1815, on Andrew Burn
- A translation of Calvin's Institutes
- Some sermons of Danirel de Superville, 1816
- Two Dissertations on Sacrifices from the Latin of William Owtram.
