= Augustinianism =

Philosophical and theological system of Augustine of Hippo

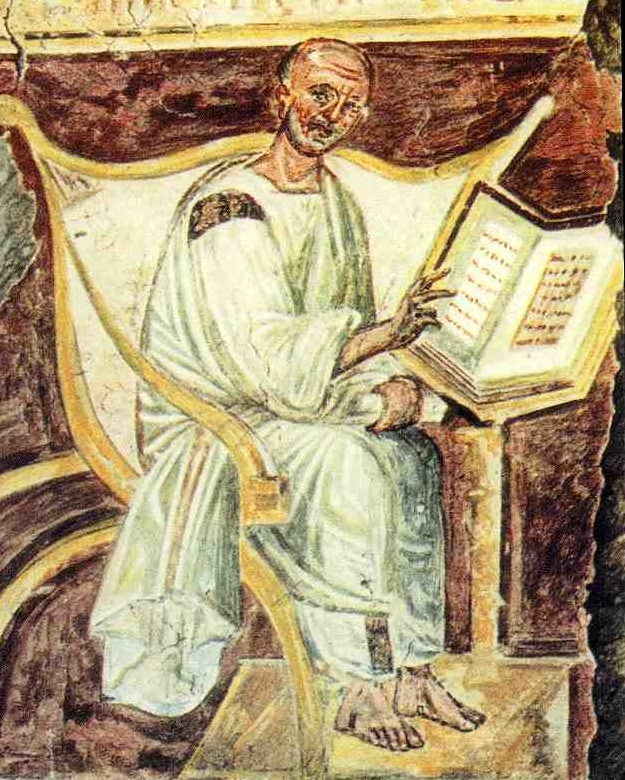
Augustine of Hippo, after whom Augustinianism is named

Augustinianism is the philosophical and theological system of Augustine of Hippo and its subsequent development by other thinkers, notably Boethius, Anselm of Canterbury and Bonaventure. Among Augustine's most important works are The City of God, De doctrina Christiana, and Confessions.

Originally, Augustinianism developed in opposition to Pelagianism; it was widespread in medieval western philosophy until the arrival of Thomism and Aristotelianism.

Plato and Plotinus influenced Augustine in many ways, and he is considered a Neoplatonic philosopher. The Augustinian theodicy and other Augustinian doctrines such as the divine illumination and the invisible church show a strong Platonic influence.

Pope Benedict XVI cautioned that all of the Western Church teaching leads to him:

St Augustine. This man of passion and faith, of the highest intelligence and tireless in his pastoral care, a great Saint and Doctor of the Church is often known, at least by hearsay, even by those who ignore Christianity or who are not familiar with it, because he left a very deep mark on the cultural life of the West and on the whole world. Because of his special importance St Augustine's influence was widespread. It could be said on the one hand that all the roads of Latin Christian literature led to Hippo (today Annaba, on the coast of Algeria), the place where he was Bishop from 395 to his death in 430, and, on the other, that from this city of Roman Africa, many other roads of later Christianity and of Western culture itself branched out.

== View of humanity ==
Augustine considered the human race as a compact mass, a collective body, responsible in its unity and solidarity. Carrying out his system in all its logical consequences, he laid down the following rigid proposition as his doctrine: "As all men have sinned in Adam; they are subject to the condemnation of God on account of this hereditary sin and the guilt thereof."

— Karl Rudolf Hagenbach

According to Augustine, even the world and corporeal entities, being fruits of divine love, have their value and meaning, unlike Platonists, who tended to devalue them. This attempt to place history and earthly existence within a heavenly perspective, where even evil finds explanation in some way, always remained at the center of its philosophical concerns.

== Ethics ==
These are the most important values for an Augustinian.

1. Love
2. Interiority
3. Humility
4. Devotion to study and the pursuit of wisdom
5. Freedom
6. Community
7. Common good
8. Humble and generous service
9. Friendship
10. Prayer

=== Meta-ethics ===
Augustine offered the Divine command theory, a theory which proposes that an action's status as morally good is equivalent to whether it is commanded by God. Augustine's theory began by casting ethics as the pursuit of the supreme good, which delivers human happiness. Augustine argued that to achieve this happiness, humans must love objects that are worthy of human love in the correct manner; this requires humans to love God, which then allows them to correctly love that which is worthy of being loved. Augustine's ethics proposed that the act of loving God enables humans to properly orient their loves, leading to human happiness and fulfilment.

=== Just war ===
Just war theory is a doctrine that determines whether a war waged by a state is morally justifiable, or not, through a series of criteria, all of which must be met for a war to be considered just. Citing Romans 13:4 Augustine claims that, while individuals should not resort immediately to violence, God has given the sword to government for good reason. Augustine argues that Christians, as part of a government, need not be ashamed of protecting peace and punishing wickedness when forced to do so by a government. Augustine asserted that this was a personal, philosophical stance: "What is here required is not a bodily action, but an inward disposition. The sacred seat of virtue is the heart."

=== Happiness ===
Augustine's ethics is that of ancient eudaimonism, but he defers happiness to the afterlife and blames the ancient ethicists saying that their arrogant conviction resulting from their ignorance of the fallen condition of humanity that they could reach happiness in this life by philosophical endeavor. Augustine takes it as axiomatic that happiness is the ultimate goal pursued by all human beings. For Augustine, happiness or the good life is brought about by the possession of the greatest good in nature that humans can attain and that one cannot lose against one's will.

== Epistemology ==
Augustine emphasised the role of divine illumination in our thought, saying that "The mind needs to be enlightened by light from outside itself, so that it can participate in truth, because it is not itself the nature of truth. You will light my lamp, Lord."

For Augustine, God does not give us certain information, but rather gives us insight into the truth of the information we received for ourselves.

If we both see that what you say is true, and we both see that what I say is true, then where do we see that? Not I in you, nor you in me, but both of us in that unalterable truth that is above our minds.

Thomas Aquinas criticizes the divine illumination, denying that in this life we have divine ideas as an object of thought, and that divine illumination is sufficient on its own, without the senses. Aquinas also denied that there is a special continuing divine influence on human thought. People have sufficient capacity for thought on their own, without needing "new illumination added onto their natural illumination".

== Anthropology ==
=== Soul ===
Saint Augustine was one of the first Christian ancient Latin authors with very clear anthropological vision. Augustine saw the human being as a perfect unity of two substances: soul and body. He was much closer in this anthropological view to Aristotle than to Plato. In his late treatise *On Care to Be Had for the Dead", sec. 5 (420 AD), he insisted that the body pertains to the essence of the human person:

In no wise are the bodies themselves to be spurned. ... For these pertain not to ornament or aid which is applied from without, but to the very nature of man.

Augustine's favourite figure to describe body-soul unity is marriage: caro tua, coniunx tua – "your body is your wife". According to N. Blasquez, Saint Augustine's dualism of substances of the body and soul does not stop him from seeing the unity of body and soul as a substance itself. Following ancient philosophers he defined man as a "rational mortal animal" – animal rationale mortale.

=== Original sin ===
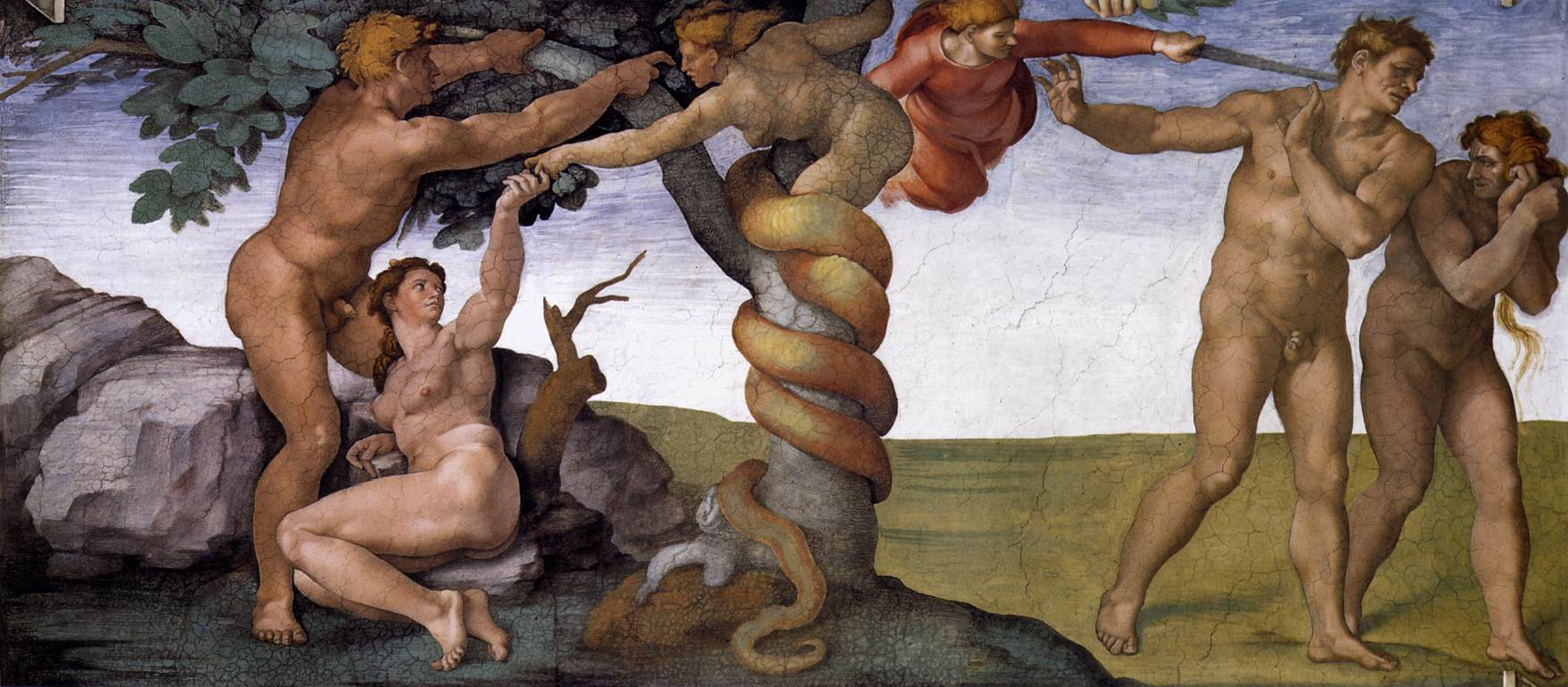
Michelangelo's painting of the sin of Adam and Eve from the Sistine Chapel ceiling

Augustine wrote that original sin is transmitted by concupiscence and enfeebles freedom of the will without destroying it. For Augustine, Adam's sin is transmitted by concupiscence, or "hurtful desire", resulting in humanity becoming a massa damnata (mass of perdition, condemned crowd), with much enfeebled, though not destroyed, freedom of will. When Adam sinned, human nature was thenceforth transformed. Adam and Eve, via sexual reproduction, recreated human nature. Their descendants now live in sin, in the form of concupiscence, a term Augustine used in a metaphysical, not a psychological sense. Augustine insisted that concupiscence was not "a being" but a "bad quality", the privation of good or a wound. He admitted that sexual concupiscence (libido) might have been present in the perfect human nature in paradise, and that only later it became disobedient to human will as a result of the first couple's disobedience to God's will in the* original sin. In Augustine's view (termed "Realism"), all of humanity was really present in Adam when he sinned, and therefore all have sinned. Original sin, according to Augustine, consists of the guilt of Adam which all humans inherit. Justo L. González interprets Augustine's teaching that humans are utterly depraved in nature and grace is irresistible, results in conversion, and leads to perseverance.

Augustine's understanding of the consequences of original sin and the necessity of redeeming grace was developed in the struggle against Pelagius and his Pelagian disciples, Caelestius and Julian of Eclanum, who had been inspired by Rufinus of Syria, a disciple of Theodore of Mopsuestia. They refused to agree that original sin wounded human will and mind, insisting that human nature was given the power to act, to speak, and to think when God created it. Human nature cannot lose its moral capacity for doing good, but a person is free to act or not to act in a righteous way. Pelagius gave an example of eyes: they have capacity for seeing, but a person can make either good or bad use of it.

The Catholic Church accepts the doctrine of original sin as Augustine taught.

=== Predestination ===
For Augustine God orders all things while preserving human freedom. Prior to 396, Augustine believed that predestination was based on God's foreknowledge of whether individuals would believe, that God's grace was "a reward for human assent". Later, in response to Pelagius, Augustine said that the sin of pride consists in assuming that "we are the ones who choose God or that God chooses us (in his foreknowledge) because of something worthy in us", and argued that it is God's grace that causes the individual act of faith.

Some Catholics dispute that Augustine believed predestination in the latter way, and claim that Augustine affirmed free will in the choice of being saved or not.

=== Theodicy and Free will ===
The problem of evil is the question of how to reconcile the existence of evil with an omnipotent, omnibenevolent, and omniscient God.

Augustine develops key ideas regarding his response to suffering. In Confessions, Augustine wrote that his previous work was dominated by materialism and that reading the works of Plato enabled him to consider the existence of a non-physical substance. This helped him develop a response to the problem of evil from a theological (and non-Manichean) perspective.

Augustine rejected the notion that evil exists in itself, proposing instead that it is a privation of (or falling away from) good, and a corruption of nature. He wrote that "evil has no positive nature; but the loss of good has received the name 'evil'." Both moral and natural evil occurs, Augustine argued, owing to an evil use of free will, which could be traced back to the original sin of Adam and Eve. He believed that this evil will, present in the human soul, was a corruption of the will given to humans by God, making suffering a just punishment for the sin of humans. Because Augustine believed that all of humanity was "seminally present in the loins of Adam", he argued that all of humanity inherited Adam's sin and his just punishment. However, in spite of his belief that free will can be turned to evil, Augustine maintained that it is vital for humans to have free will, because they could not live well without it. He argued that evil could come from humans because, although humans contained no evil, they were also not perfectly good and hence could be corrupted.

== Augustinian philosophers ==
- Fulgentius of Ruspe
- Fulgentius Ferrandus
- Possidius
- Marius Mercator
- Orosius
- Cassiodorus
- Caesarius of Arles
- Arnobius the Younger
- Boethius
- Isidore of Seville
- Antoine Arnauld
- Blaise Pascal
- Nicolas Malebranche
- Anselm of Canterbury
- Giles of Rome
- Gregory of Rimini
- John Scotus Eriugena
- Bonaventure
- Bruno of Cologne
- John Henry Newman
- Pope Benedict XVI
- René Descartes

== See also ==
- Ambrose
- Amillennialism
- Augustinian soteriology
- Augustinian hypothesis
- Filioque
- Scotism
- Scholasticism
- Christian humanism
- Latin theology
- Neoplatonism and Christianity
- Western Christianity

== Sources ==
- Bonner, Ali (2018). The Myth of Pelagianism. British Academy Monograph. Oxford: Oxford University Press. ISBN 978-0-19-726639-7.
- Chadwick, Henry (2001). Augustine: A Very Short Introduction. Oxford: Oxford University Press. ISBN 978-0-19-285452-0.
- Dodaro, Robert (2004). Christ and the Just Society in the Thought of Augustine. Cambridge: Cambridge University Press. ISBN 978-1-139-45651-7.
- Elliott, Mark W. (2011). "Pelagianism". In McFarland, Ian A.; Fergusson, David A. S.; Kilby, Karen; Torrance, Iain R. (eds.). The Cambridge Dictionary of Christian Theology. pp. 377–378. ISBN 978-0-511-78128-5.
- Harrison, Carol (2016). "Truth in a Heresy?". The Expository Times. 112 (3): 78–82. doi:10.1177/001452460011200302. S2CID 170152314.
- James, Frank A. III (1998). Peter Martyr Vermigli and Predestination: The Augustinian Inheritance of an Italian Reformer. Oxford: Clarendon. Archived from the original on 22 December 2015 – via Questia.
- Keech, Dominic (2012). The Anti-Pelagian Christology of Augustine of Hippo, 396-430. Oxford: Oxford University Press. ISBN 978-0-19-966223-4.
- Kirwan, Christopher (1998). "Pelagianism". Routledge Encyclopedia of Philosophy. Taylor & Francis. doi:10.4324/9780415249126-K064-1. ISBN 978-0-415-25069-6.
- Nelson, Eric (2019). The Theology of Liberalism: Political Philosophy and the Justice of God. Cambridge: Harvard University Press. ISBN 978-0-674-24094-0.
- Puchniak, Robert (2008). "Pelagius: Kierkegaard's use of Pelagius and Pelagianism". In Stewart, Jon Bartley (ed.). Kierkegaard and the Patristic and Medieval Traditions. Ashgate Publishing, Ltd. ISBN 978-0-7546-6391-1.
- Rackett, Michael R. (2002). "What's Wrong with Pelagianism?". Augustinian Studies. 33 (2): 223–237. doi:10.5840/augstudies200233216.
- Scheck, Thomas P. (2012). "Pelagius's Interpretation of Romans". In Cartwright, Steven (ed.). A Companion to St. Paul in the Middle Ages. Leiden: Brill. pp. 79–114. ISBN 978-90-04-23671-4.
- Squires, Stuart (2016). "Jerome on Sinlessness: a Via Media between Augustine and Pelagius". The Heythrop Journal. 57 (4): 697–709. doi:10.1111/heyj.12063.
- Stump, Eleonore (2001). "Augustine on free will". In Stump, Eleonore; Kretzmann, Norman (eds.). The Cambridge Companion to Augustine. New York: Cambridge University Press. pp. 124–147. ISBN 978-1-1391-7804-4.
- Visotzky, Burton L. (2009). "Will and Grace: Aspects of Judaising in Pelagianism in Light of Rabbinic and Patristic Exegesis of Genesis". In Grypeou, Emmanouela; Spurling, Helen (eds.). The Exegetical Encounter Between Jews and Christians in Late Antiquity. Leiden: Brill. pp. 43–62. ISBN 978-90-04-17727-7.
- Weaver, Rebecca (2014). "Introduction". In Hwang, Alexander Y.; Matz, Brian J.; Casiday, Augustine (eds.). Grace for Grace: The Debates after Augustine and Pelagius. Washington, D.C.: Catholic University of America Press. pp. xi–xxvi. ISBN 978-0-8132-2601-9.
- Wetzel, James (2001). "Predestination, Pelagianism, and foreknowledge". In Stump, Eleonore; Kretzmann, Norman (eds.). The Cambridge Companion to Augustine. New York: Cambridge University Press. pp. 49–58. ISBN 978-1-1391-7804-4.
