= Augustinianum =

Augustinianum may refer to:

- Scholengemeenschap Augustinianum, school in Eindhoven
- Patristic Institute Augustinianum, institution in Rome
- Augustinianum (journal), published by the Patristic Institute Augustinianum
