= Synod of Diospolis =

Synod of Diospolis was a 415 synod in Diospolis (now Lod, Israel) in which Pelagius was accused of heresy by the exiled Gallic bishops. It followed a council held earlier that year.

Heros of Arles was installed as bishop in the face of local opposition, and then lost his see in the reprisals which followed the defeat and execution of Constantine III. Together with Lazarus of Aix, who had likewise been appointed by Constantine and then deposed by Constantius, he then spent several years in Palestine.

Pelagius and Jerome were also in Palestine. Pelagius had criticized Jerome's commentary on the Epistle to the Ephesians and Jerome wrote against Pelagius in his Letter to Ctesiphon and Dialogus contra Pelagianos. With Jerome at the time was Orosius, a visiting pupil of Augustine, who had similar views on the dangers of Pelagianism. Together, they publicly condemned Pelagius.

A synod was convoked by John of Jerusalem in the summer of 415. Orosius spoke against Pelagius, and stated that a council at Carthage had condemned Caelestius (a disciple of Pelagius) and his ideas on original sin. Orosius' lack of fluency in Greek rendered him unconvincing and John's Eastern background made him more willing to accept that humans did not have inherent sinfulness, yet the synod rendered no verdict, and it was decided that the controversy should be handed over to the Pope Innocent I. Augustine states that no official records of this meeting were kept and only Orosius kept a few notes.

A further synod was held in December 415. It was summoned by Eulogius, bishop of Caesarea and included thirteen other bishops. The synod was convoked to judge an accusation made by Heros of Arles and Lazarus of Aix, who had written a letter to condemn Pelagianism (They also wrote a second letter together to the Council of Carthage (416)). Heros and Lazarus were allies of Jerome, as was Paul Orosius.

Pelagius spoke Greek and Latin, and as the members of synod could not read Latin in detail, they were limited in how they could question him and his writings. Pelagius defended himself by disavowing the doctrines of Caelestius and was not convicted.

Both Jerome and Augustine were unhappy with the verdict, with Jerome calling it, “the wretched Synod of Diospolis”. Pope Innocent stated that "he could not bring himself to refuse either blame or praise of those bishops." Fragments of the synod's proceedings are preserved in Augustine's work On the Proceedings of Pelagius.

== Aftermath ==
Pelagian doctrines were officially condemned at the Councils of Carthage of 418, and Pelagius was declared a heretic by the First Council of Ephesus in 431. Saint Cyril of Alexandria allowed him to settle in Egypt after Pelagius had been expelled from Jerusalem, and Pelagius is not heard of thereafter.

The death of Pelagius did not end his teachings, although those who followed him may have modified those teachings. Belief in Pelagianism and Semi-Pelagianism was common for the next few centuries, especially in Britain, Palestine and North Africa. Saint Germanus visited Britain to combat Pelagianism in or around 429 AD. In Wales, Saint David was credited with convening the Synod of Brefi and the Synod of Victory against the followers of Pelagius in the sixth century.

With Pelagianism officially condemned, a compromise between Pelagianism and Augustinism emerged. A more moderate form of Pelagianism claimed that man's faith was an act of free will unassisted by prevenient grace. The term "Semi-Pelagianism" was unknown in antiquity, appearing for the first time only in the last quarter of the 16th century in connection with Luis de Molina's doctrine of grace: opponents of this theologian believed they saw a close resemblance to the views advocated by monks of Southern Gaul at and around Marseille after 428. Even after this confusion had been exposed as an error, the newly coined term "Semi-Pelagianism" was retained in learned circles as an apt designation for the views of those monks, most notably John Cassian. At the Council of Orange in 529, called and presided over by the Augustinian Caesarius of Arles, semi-Pelagianism was condemned but Augustinian ideas were also not accepted entirely: the synod advocated synergism, the idea that human freedom and divine grace work together for salvation.

== See also ==
- Christianity in the 5th century

== Sources ==
- Burnett, Carole C. (2003). "Dysfunction at Diospolis". Augustinian Studies. 34 (2): 153–173. doi:10.5840/augstudies200334213.
- Deane, Vincent (1990). "HCE and the Fall of Pelagius". European Joyce Studies. 2: 109–123. ISSN 0923-9855.
- Lössl, Josef (1997). Intellectus Gratiae: Die erkenntnistheoretische und hermeneutische Dimension der Gnadenlehre Augustins von Hippo (in German). BRILL. pp. 251–252. ISBN 978-90-04-31305-7.
- Rees, Brinley Roderick (1998). Pelagius: Life and Letters. Woodbridge: Boydell & Brewer. p. 147. ISBN 978-0-85115-714-6.
