= Augustinus-Lexikon =

Christian encyclopedia

- Language: German, English, French
- Publisher: Schwabe AG for the Academy of Sciences and Literature in Mainz
- Publication date: 1986 to present
- Publication place: Germany
- Media type: Print

The Augustinus-Lexikon is a trilingual scholarly encyclopedia under the editorship of Cornelius Petrus Mayer, Robert Dodaro, and others that has as its subject matter the life and works of St Augustine of Hippo. It is a project of the Academy of Sciences and Literature in Mainz and is in the process of being published over a number of years by Schwabe AG, a publishing house in Basel the activities of which extend over five centuries. Pope Benedict XVI was known to be among the admirers and users of this work.

== See also ==
- Augustinian Studies
- Augustinianum
