= The Cambridge Companion to Augustine =

The Cambridge Companion to Augustine refers to two volumes of essays about Augustine of Hippo and Augustinianism published in 2001 and 2014 by Cambridge University Press, with largely disjoint contents. The editors of the first version were Eleonore Stump and Norman Kretzmann, and for the second version Stump and David Vincent Meconi.
