= Marie-Pierre Arnaud-Lindet =

French Roman historian and professor (1936 - 2018)

Marie-Pierre Arnaud-Lindet (22 December 1936 – 27 April 2018) was a Roman historian and Professor of History at Université Paris 1 Panthéon-Sorbonne.

== Education ==
Arnaud-Lindet received her PhD from the University of Paris 1 Panthéon-Sorbonne. Her thesis was entitled Recherches sur Orose historien: sources et méthodes de compositions des "Histoires". Her doctoral research was supervised by Joël Le Gall.

== Career ==
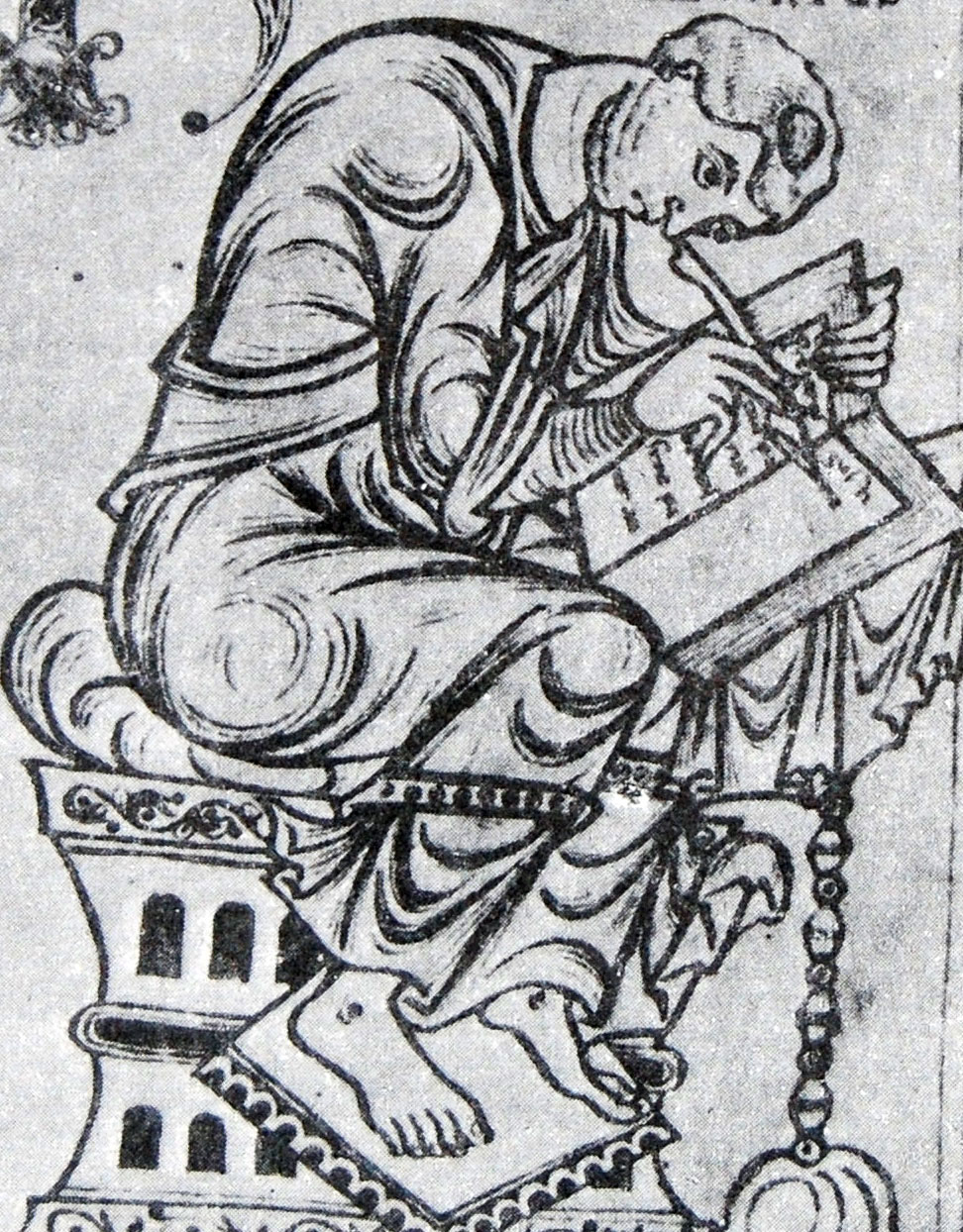
Paulus Orosius, as imagined in an eleventh-century manuscript

Marie-Pierre Arnaud-Lindet (nee Arnaud) was Maître-Assistante d'Histoire romaine at University of Paris 1 Panthéon-Sorbonne. She was a history teacher at the Lycée Le Corbusier in Poissy from 1967 to 1968.

Arnaud-Lindet was an expert on the late antique historian Paulus Orosius (fl. early fifth century CE). She wrote five books, including translations of Orosius' Historiae adversus paganos and Festus' Breviarium. R. A. Markus considered that Arnaud-Lindet's translation of Orosius read well and was 'handsomely produced'.

== Death ==
Arnaud-Lindet died on 27 April 2018. She was buried on 4 May at Montparnasse Cemetery in Paris.

== Bibliography ==
- Histoires contre les païens (Paulus Orosius, Historiae adversus paganos) (Paris: Belles Lettres, 1990-91) 3 volumes
- Aide-mémoire (Lucius Ampelius, Liber memorialis) (Paris: Belles Lettres, 1993)
- L'Orose de Wrocław (Rehdigeranus 107) : sa composition et sa place dans la tradition manuscrite des Histoires d'Orose (Wrocław: Wydawnictwo Uniwersytetu Wrocławskiego, 1997)
- Histoire et politique à Rome, Les historiens romains, IIIe s. av. J.-C. - Ve s. av. J.-C. (Paris, Pocket, 2001)
- Synthèse thématique d'histoire romaine (Nantes: Editions du Temps, 2004)
- (with Bernadette Cabouret) L'Afrique romaine de 69 à 439 (Nantes: Temps, 2005)
