= Ian Clausen =

American philosopher

- Spouse: Lauren Clausen

Education
- Education: University of Edinburgh (PhD, MTh), University of Illinois at Urbana-Champaign (BA)
- Thesis: The weight of love: locating and directing the soul in Augustine's early works (2014)
- Doctoral advisor: Oliver O'Donovan, Sara Parvis

Philosophical work
- Era: 21st-century philosophy
- Region: Western philosophy
- Institutions: Villanova University
- Main interests: Augustine

Ian Clausen is an American philosopher and Assistant Teaching Professor at Villanova University. Previously he was Arthur J. Ennis Postdoctoral Fellow at this university. Clausen is known for his works on Saint Augustine's thought. He is the editor-in-chief of Augustinian Studies. Currently he is a professor of the mandatory freshmen Augustine Culture Seminar (ACS) program at Villanova University.

== Books ==
- On Love, Confession, Surrender and the Moral Self, Ian Clausen, [Reading Augustine Series], Bloomsbury, New York and London, 2018
