= Heros of Arles =

French bishop

Heros was Bishop of Arles from 408 to 412. He was installed as bishop by the usurper Constantine III, and was deposed by Constantius III.

Prosper of Aquitaine describes him in his Chronicle as "vir sanctus, et beati Martini discipulus". He was installed as bishop in the face of local opposition. Heros lost his see in the reprisals which followed the defeat and execution of Constantine III, and was replaced by Patroclus of Arles.

Along with Lazarus, who had also been deposed as bishop of Aix-en-Provence by Constantius, he went into exile in Palestine. In 415 both Heros and Lazarus wrote a letter to the Council of Diospolis condemning Pelagianism; they wrote a second letter together to the Council of Carthage (416).
