= James Wetzel =

James Wetzel is Chair of Saint Augustine, Professor of Philosophy, and Director of the Augustinian Institute at Villanova University. He obtained his doctorate from Columbia University.

== Works ==
- Wetzel, James (1992). Augustine and the Limits of Virtue. Cambridge: Cambridge University Press. ISBN 978-0-521-40541-6.
- Wetzel, James (2010). Augustine: A Guide for the Perplexed. A&C Black. ISBN 978-1-84706-196-6.
- Wetzel, James (2012). Augustine's City of God: A Critical Guide. Cambridge University Press. ISBN 978-1-139-57644-4.
- Wetzel, James (2013). Parting Knowledge: Essays after Augustine. Wipf and Stock Publishers. ISBN 978-1-62189-787-3.
