= Orosius =

Roman historian and theologian (c. 375/385 – c. 420 AD)

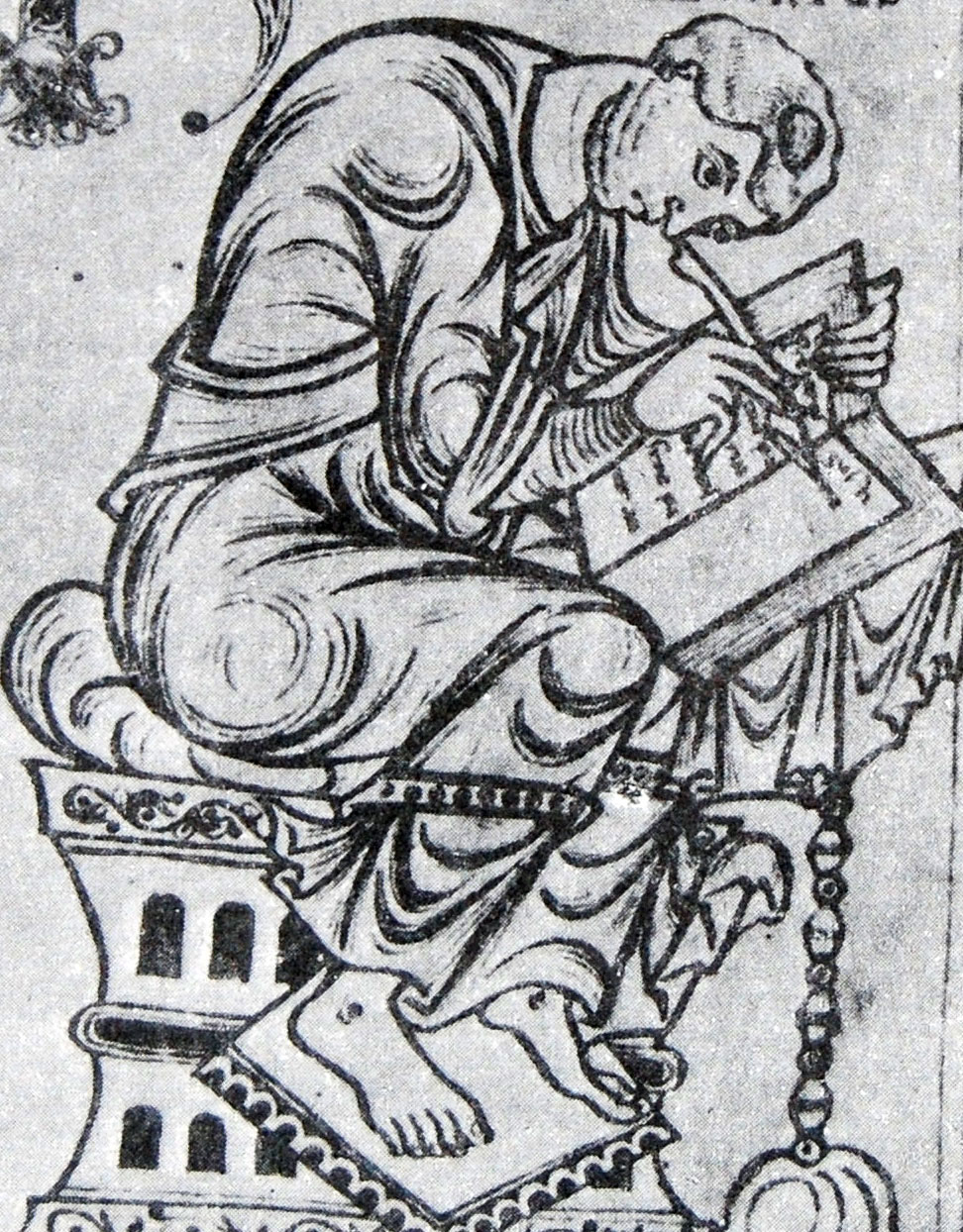
- Miniature from the Saint-Epure codex
- Born: c. 375/85 AD; Braga, Gallaecia
- Died: c. 420 AD
- Occupations: Theologian and historian

Academic background
- Influences: Augustine of Hippo; Livy; Jerome; Junianus Justinus; Tacitus; Suetonius; Florus

Academic work
- Main interests: Providentialism; Universal history; Germanic paganism

Paulus Orosius (/ˈpɔːləs əˈroʊʒəs/; born c. 375/385 – c. 420 AD), less often Paul Orosius in English, was a Roman priest, historian and theologian, and a student of Augustine of Hippo. It is possible that he was born in Bracara Augusta (now Braga, Portugal), then capital of the Roman province of Gallaecia, which would have been the capital of the Kingdom of the Suebi by his death. Although there are some questions regarding his biography, such as his exact date of birth, it is known that he was a person of some prestige from a cultural point of view, as he had contact with the greatest figures of his time such as Augustine of Hippo and Jerome of Stridon. In order to meet with them Orosius travelled to cities on the southern coast of the Mediterranean Sea, such as Hippo Regius, Alexandria, and Jerusalem.

These journeys defined his life and intellectual output. Orosius did not just discuss theological matters with Augustine; he also collaborated with him on the book City of God. In addition, in 415 he was chosen to travel to Palestine in order to exchange information with other intellectuals. While there he participated at a Church Council meeting in Jerusalem and was subsequently entrusted with transporting the relics of Saint Stephen. The date of his death is unclear, although it appears to have not been earlier than 418, when he finished one of his books, or later than 423.

He wrote a total of three books, of which his most important is his Seven Books of History Against the Pagans (Latin: Historiarum Adversum Paganos Libri VII), considered to be one of the works with the greatest impact on historiography during the period between antiquity and the Middle Ages. Part of its importance comes from the fact that Orosius clearly demonstrates his historiographical methodology. The book is a historical narration focusing on the pagan peoples from the earliest eras up until the time when Orosius was alive.

Orosius was a highly influential figure both for the dissemination of information (History Against the Pagans being one of the main sources of information regarding antiquity until the Renaissance) and for rationalising the study of history (with his methodology greatly influencing later historians).

== Biographical sources ==
Despite the importance of his books many questions remain regarding his life, hampering efforts to construct a biography with any certainty. This is particularly true for sources of information regarding his birth and death. However, his life has been widely studied and there are a number of authors who propose dates for both events.

The main biographical references for Orosius come from the writings of Gennadius of Massilia and Braulio of Zaragoza, although his own writings should not be overlooked. In addition, Orosius is mentioned in letters written by Augustine.

== Questions regarding his identity ==
=== Name ===
While there is no doubt regarding his surname of Orosius, there are questions regarding the use of the name "Paulus". The problem is that it is not completely certain if he used this name or if he was simply called Orosius and whether Paulus has been added with the passing of time. This could have happened given that the initial "P" for "presbyter" (priest) was always placed next to his name, and over time this could have led to the confusion.

However, this idea might be flawed as authors writing immediately after Orosius's death use the name Paulus. In fact, even Casimiro Torres Rodríguez, one of the main scholars of Orosius's life, indicates that Paulus might be his Christian name and Orosius his native name, a theory that cannot be entirely dismissed.

Whatever the truth of the matter this subject has been widely studied and the most current theory is probably that of Pedro Martínez Cavero, another important Orosius scholar.

=== Ó Corráin's conclusions ===
Based on a careful reading of the relevant sources, Irish scholar Donnchadh Ó Corráin concluded that:

Orosius, author of Historiarum Adversum Paganos Libri vii, was a Briton, born at latest c. AD 375. Taken by Irish raiders, he spent years (c. AD 400) as a captive, held by traders, on the south shore of the Shannon estuary. He escaped and probably reached Galicia before AD 405. Ordained a priest, he served at Bracara (now Braga in Portugal). He corresponded with Augustine and moved to Hippo in AD 414. Sent to the East by Augustine, he played an undistinguished role at the councils of Jerusalem and Diospolis (AD 415). He settled at Carthage, where he wrote his main work, originally at the instigation of Augustine. He disappears after a voyage to the Balearic Islands. His is the first textual witness to Christianity in Ireland, observed c. AD 400, written up in AD 416–17.

=== Birthplace ===
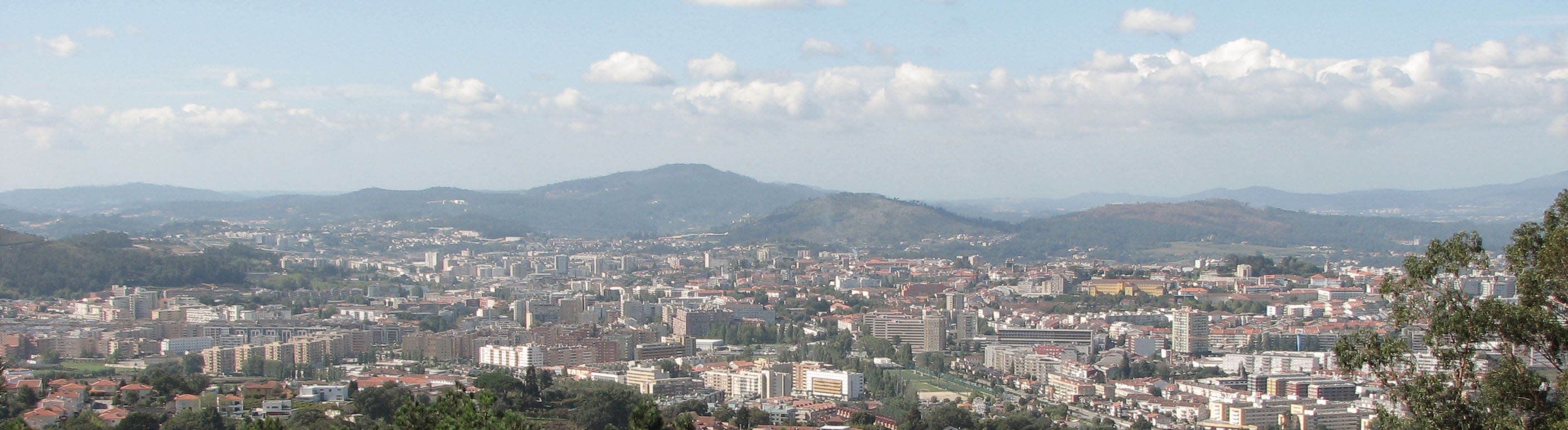
Panorama of present-day Braga, the most likely birthplace for Orosius.

The subject of his birthplace is still disputed although a broad consensus has now been reached. Basically there are four theories regarding his birthplace, that can be summarised as follows:

- Born in Braga: this idea is most widely accepted as it has the most evidence supporting it. If he was not born in Braga, it is likely he was born in the area around the town. This idea is supported by Orosius's own works and two letters written by Augustine, the 166th and the 169th.
- Born in Tarragona: this theory has been put forward because in his Histories Orosius talks of "Tarraconem nostra" (our Tarragona). The 19th-century author Teodoro de Mörner held this opinion, but nowadays it does not seem reasonable to support the idea solely based on one indication.
- Originated in A Coruña (Brigantia): this is a relatively new theory solely based on the fact that Orosius twice mentioned it in the geographical section of his Histories.
- Originated in Brittany: like the previous theory the supporting data for this theory rests on the fact that Orosius had some knowledge of this area.

=== Date of birth ===
Lastly, his supposed date of birth varies between sources. A likely date has now been calculated, however. It is known for certain that in 415 Augustine referred to Paulus Orosius as "a young priest", which means that at that time he could not have been older than 40, as he was young, and he had to be older than 30, as he was a priest.

Therefore, his date of birth can be fixed between 375 and 385, although the most widely accepted date is 383. This assumes that when Orosius met Augustine he was 32 years old, that is, he had been an ordained priest for two years.

== Biography ==
=== Early life ===
Despite the scarcity of sources, if his date of birth is accepted as that given above or at least within the window between 375 and 385 it can be seen that Orosius grew up during a period of cultural flourishing, contemporary with Hydatius and Avitus of Braga. Priscillianism was an important doctrine at this time and it is considered likely that after entering the priesthood he took an interest in the Priscillianist controversy, which was being widely debated in his native country.

The classical theories suggest that Orosius belonged to a family with good social standing, which would have allowed him to gain a good education. This would have developed along Christian lines, although assuming that Orosius was born in Braga, he would also have had a good knowledge of the rural culture of that time.

Contemporary histories indicate that from an early age Orosius was loquacious and erudite, alluding to statements to this effect made by both Augustine and Pope Gelasius I. In any case, any discussion of Orosius's youth is pure speculation and conjecture because, as discussed above, there is little knowledge regarding this period of his life.

=== Journey to Africa ===
Schematic map showing all the journeys made by Paulus Orosius.

It is thought that Paulus Orosius lived in Gallaecia (northwest Hispania) until 409, but after that time and up until 415, there is no concrete information regarding his life. The traditional chronology, or at least the most widespread, proposes the succession of events outlined in the following paragraphs.

It appears that Orosius had to leave Braga as a result of the barbarian invasions of the Roman Empire. The date of his departure is in some doubt, however, what is known for certain is that he had to leave suddenly. This is even confirmed by Orosius himself who states that he was pursued onto the beach from which he set sail.

A number of dates have been suggested for his departure from Braga, ranging from 409 to 414. The two most widely accepted dates are:

- 410: proposed by G. Fainck. This date means that Orosius had a window of 5 years for his collaboration with Augustine before he travelled to Palestine.
- 414: which is the most widely accepted. In his book Commonitorium, which was published in 414, Orosius talks of his arrival, his meeting with Augustine etc.

What is certain is that once Orosius had left the Iberian Peninsula he was certain that his destination was Hippo (now Annaba in Algeria), and a meeting with Augustine, who was the greatest thinker of his time. From his arrival Orosius formed part of a team that worked alongside Augustine. It is therefore possible that Orosius collaborated in the writing of The City of God or at the least that he was aware of the book.

In 415 Augustine entrusted Orosius with the task of travelling to Palestine to meet with the thinker Jerome who at that time was living in Bethlehem. This indicates that Augustine had a great deal of faith in Orosius as relations between Augustine and Jerome had not always been good.

=== Journeys to Palestine ===
The visit to Palestine had a double purpose: Orosius wanted to discuss a number of theological topics with Jerome, particularly those relating to the soul's origins, and Augustine wanted closer ties with the thinker and to gather information regarding the Priscillianists, Origenists and the Pelagian heresy.

In reality, it would seem that Orosius's main task was to assist Jerome and others against Pelagius, who, after the synod of Carthage in 411, had been living in Palestine, and finding some acceptance there. Orosius met with Pelagius on Augustine's behalf and he represented the orthodox party against Pelagianism at the Synod of Diospolis that was held in June 415.

At the synod Orosius communicated the decisions of the synod of Carthage and read several of Augustine's writings against Pelagius. Success, however, was not achieved among Greeks who did not understand Latin, and whose sense of reverence was unfazed by Pelagius's famous question, Et quis est mihi Augustinus? ("Who is Augustine to me?").

Orosius succeeded only in obtaining John's consent to send letters and deputies to Pope Innocent I of Rome; and, after having waited long enough to learn the unfavourable decision of the Synod of Diospolis (Lydda) in December of the same year, he returned to North Africa,

Orosius had a confrontation with the Archbishop of Jerusalem, John II at the synod, in which Orosius was accused of heresy in front of the entire conclave. As his defence Orosius wrote his second book Liber Apologeticus, in which he emphatically rejected the accusation.

Orosius's first act on meeting Jerome was to hand him the correspondence that he had brought from Augustine. This implies that the journey was always conceived of as a return journey as Orosius would have to deliver the letters from Jerome back to Augustine. In parallel to this, the relics of Saint Stephen were uncovered at the end of 415 and part of the find was given to Orosius in order that he could take it back to Braga. This marks both the start of his return journey and, from our current perspective, a new epoch in Orosius's life that is lacking in sources of information for its study.

=== Later years ===
Given that Stephen's relics were uncovered on 26 December 415, Orosius must have departed from Palestine after that date. Although his idea was to travel to Braga, he was forced to pass through Hippo as it is known that he delivered letters from Jerome to Augustine, it is also generally agreed that he passed through Jerusalem and Alexandria, although it is not known if he visited the latter on his outward journey, on his return journey or on both occasions.

During his second stay in Hippo he had a long conversation with Augustine during which he handed over the letters he was carrying from Jerome and informed Augustine about the meetings he had had with Pelagius. The idea for Orosius's great work, Historiae Adversus Paganos, was born during this reencounter with Augustine. However, it is difficult to estimate an exact date for when the book was written and for when the book was finished. This has given rise to a number of theories regarding the writing of the book:

- The traditional theory states that the book was finished between 416 and 417. Support for these dates comes from the fact that the Liber Apologeticus does not mention Orosius's work as a historian, and the prologue refers to Book XI of the City of God by Augustine, which was not published until 416. In order to justify how Orosius managed to write seven books in such a short time it is argued that he could have written summaries that were later filled out.
- A recent theory, proposed by Casimiro Torres Rodríguez, states that Orosius briefly stayed in Stridon a second time while trying to return to Portugal, which he was unable to do and he wrote the book during a third stay in Stridon. This would explain why Orosius refers in the "Histories" to events that took place in Hispania in 417.
- A third, older, theory, posed by T. von Mörner and G. Fainck, says that Orosius undertook the work before he travelled to Palestine. In fact, this idea has recently been given a new lease of life by M. P. Annaud-Lindet, although with the proviso that Orosius wrote the book during his return journey from Palestine.

=== Disappearance ===
Very little information is available regarding the life of Paulus Orosius after the publication of his Histories. It is known that he was in Menorca where he used the remains of Stephen in attempts to convert members of the Jewish community to Christianity, but the date of his death is not known. This lack of information regarding Orosius could be due to cooling of relations with Augustine, who never makes any clear unambiguous references to Orosius's "Histories" once they have been published. Gennadius of Massilia considers that Orosius lived at least until the end of the Roman emperor Honorius’ reign, which lasted until 423. However, there is no news of Orosius after 417 and it seems unlikely that such an active author would go six years without publishing anything new.

There are other theories, from a sudden death to a range of legends that talk of Orosius's final arrival in Hispania and his founding of a monastery near to Cabo de Palos where he ended his days, although this latter idea now seems improbable.

== His works ==
=== Commonitorium and Liber Apologeticus ===
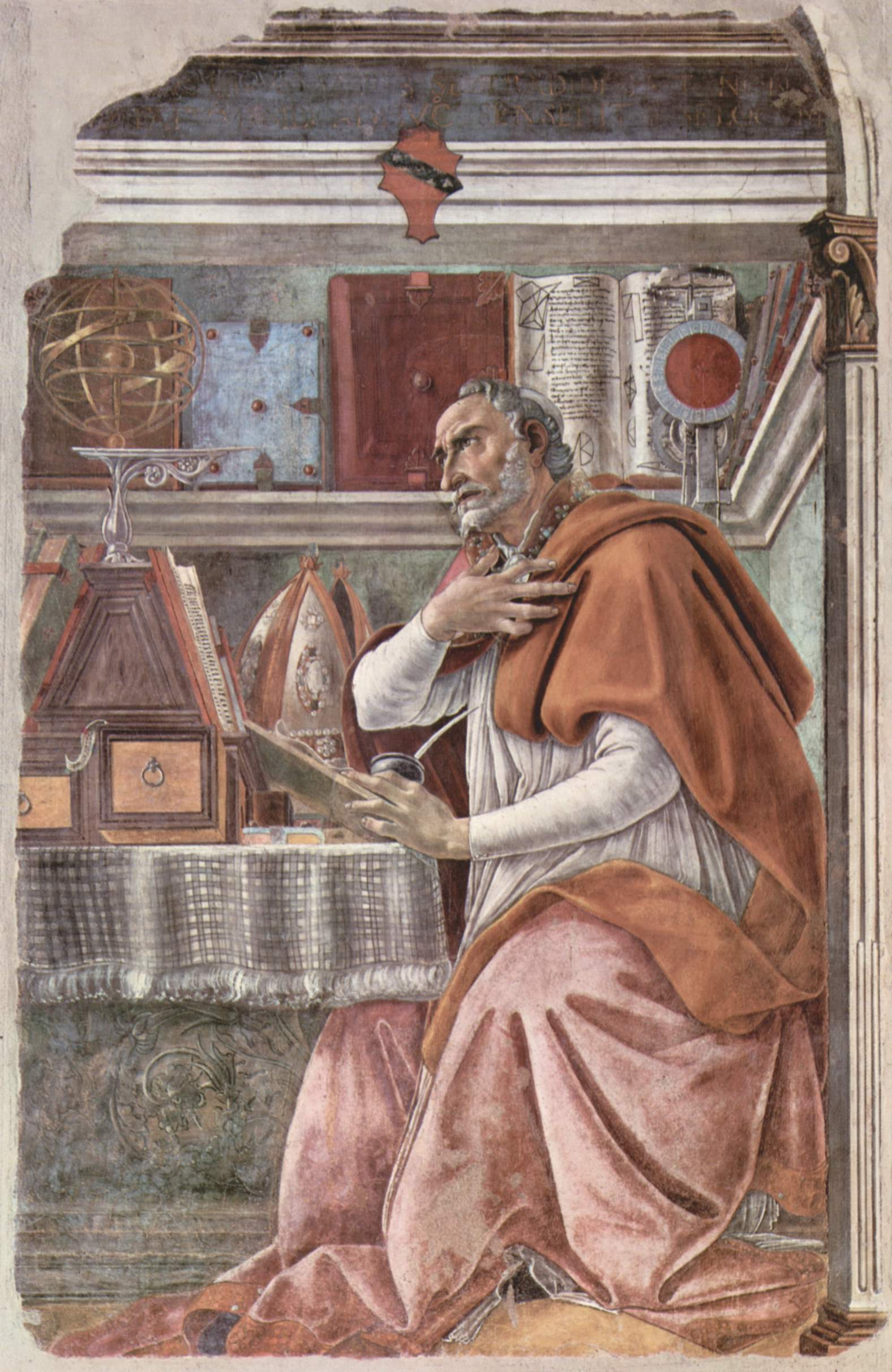
The Commonitorium and the Histories are a response, at least in their origins, to the direct influence that Augustine of Hippo exercised over Orosius.

Although Paulus Orosius's most important book was the Historiae Adversus Paganos, his other two surviving books must also be taken into account: Commonitorium and Liber Apologeticus.

The full name of his first book is Consultatio sive commonitorium ad Augustinum de errore Priscillianistarum et Origenistarum (in English: A Warning and Reminder to Augustine Against the Errors of the Priscillians and the Origenists). Its chronology is littered with the same grey areas as Orosius's biography. In principle it is a book intended for Augustine and therefore it must have been written before Orosius arrived in Africa, between 409 and 414 as discussed above. The second chronological limit is 415, which is traditionally considered to be the date when Augustine's book Liber ad Orosium contra Priscillianistas et Origenistas was published, in which Augustine replies to Orosius's Commonitorium.

The book is not only aimed at Augustine but was also preceded by conversations with him. It not only describes Orosius journey to Africa, but also summarises the beliefs of Priscillianism and Origenism, and it asks for Augustine's advice regarding these theological issues, thereby exposing some of Orosius's theological doubts.

The full name of Orosius's second book is Liber apologeticus contra Pelagium de Arbitrii libertate. It was published at the time of Orosius's participation in the Council of Jerusalem in 415. The book is the result of a theological debate during which Archbishop John II accused Orosius of heresy due to his idea that man cannot remain free of sin, not even with the help of divine intervention.

In order to defend himself from these accusations Orosius wrote Liber Apologeticus, in which he describes his motives for participating in the synod, he was invited by Jerome, and rejects the accusation of heresy made against him. However, neither of these two books are of a historical nature, despite containing elements that help in the reconstruction of Orosius's life.

=== Historiae Adversus Paganos ===
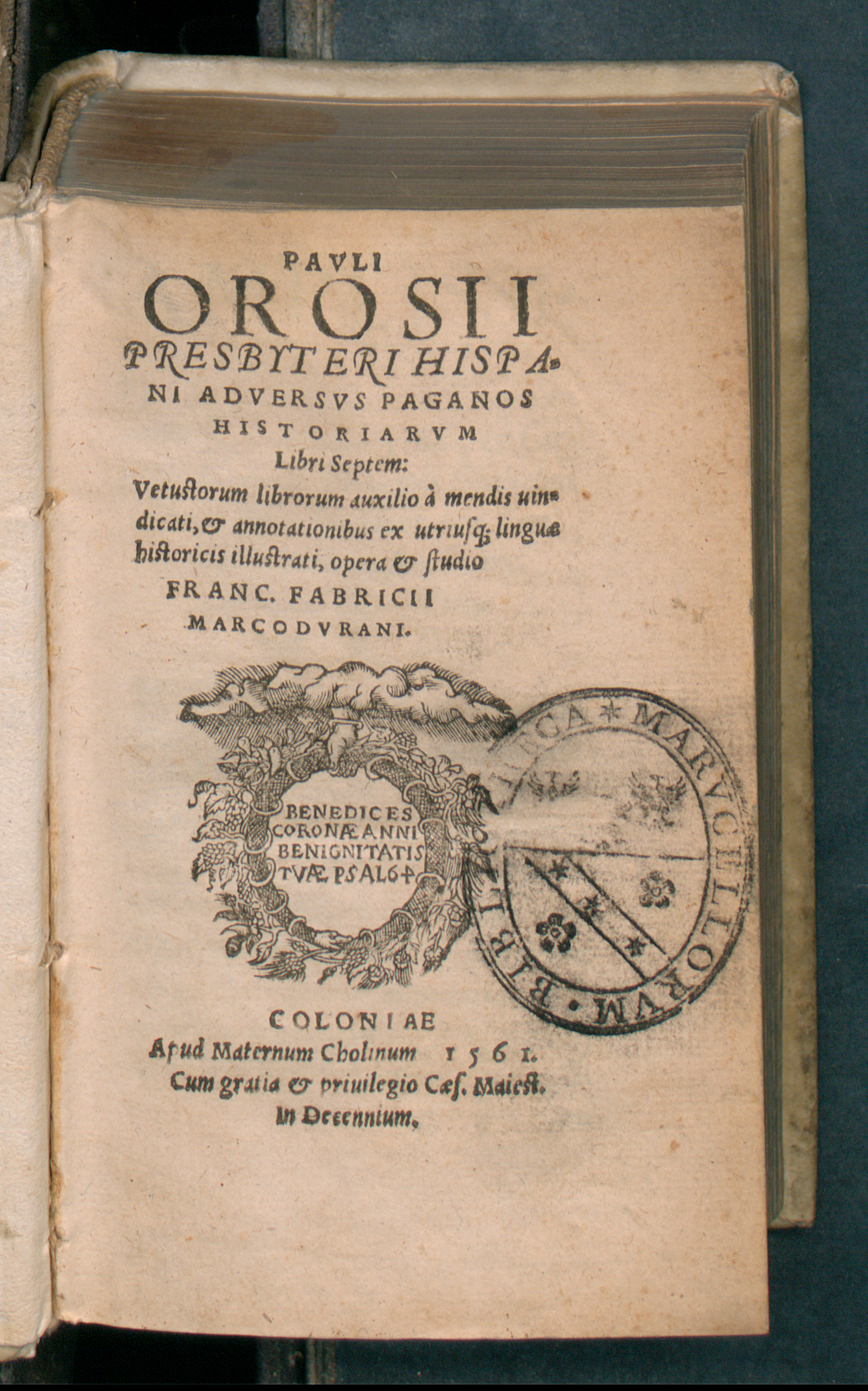
Historiae adversus paganos, 1561

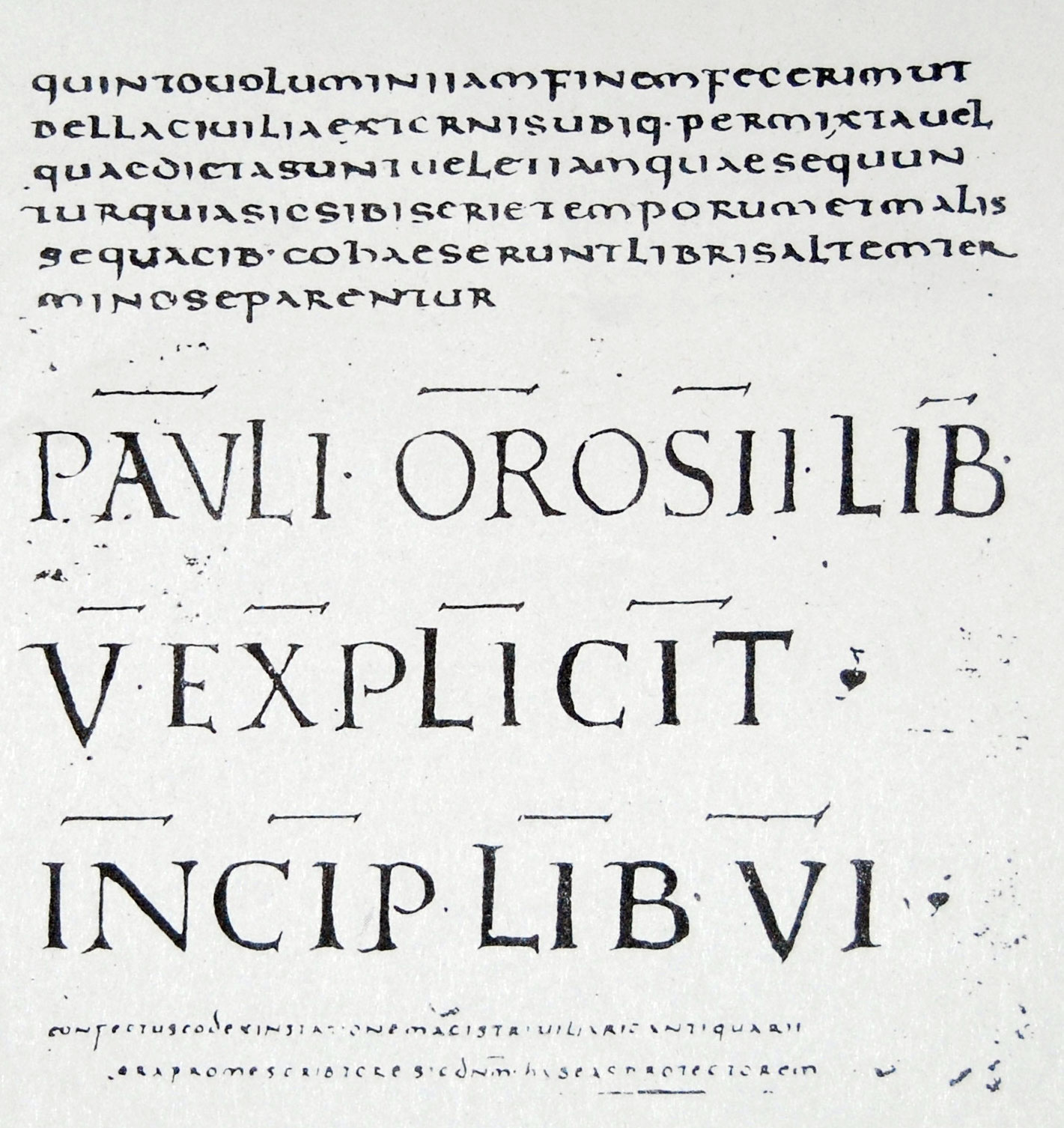
Page from a manuscript of Orosius's Histories held in Florence.

Paulus Orosius's masterpiece is Historiae Adversus Paganos, the only history book that he wrote, which gives insight into the historiographical methodology of the Spanish priesthood. It is not possible to be certain as to when it was written as there is no single theory that is unanimously accepted by all historians. The most common estimate places the drafting of the book between 416 and 417.

Miguel Ángel Rábade Navarro offers a clear and concise definition on Orosius's history in one of his articles on the author. In this article Rábade calls the Histories a "universalist history with an apologetic and providentialist character, whose main aim is to compare a pagan past with a Christian present, through their followers, their actions and their geographical and temporal location".

Be this as it may, the book had a definite origin and a clear purpose. The book's origins were a response to Augustine's express desire for a book that would complement his De Civitate Dei which is a history focused on the pagan races. The date of the book is not our main focus here, what is more important is Orosius's objective in responding to Augustine's request by writing a book aimed at proving that Rome’s decadence – Rome was sacked by Alaric I in 410 – had nothing at all to do with the fact that the Romans had relatively recently converted to Christianity.

In a more general way Orosius wanted to show that the world has improved since the introduction of Christianity rather than declined as others had argued. In response to those who pointed to contemporary disasters, he simply argues that previous disasters occurring before Christianity were much worse. The work, a universal history of the calamities that have happened to mankind was the first attempt to write the history of the world as a history of God guiding humanity.

Throughout the seven books that comprise the history, Orosius introduces several new methods and he also uses others that pick up on the traditional methods of Graeco-Roman historiography. Orosius never offers a negative image of the Pagans, in this way he is being true to the traditions of the Graeco-Roman historians of that time, who always tried to give a positive impression of their "enemies".

==== Editions ====
The Histories have been widely printed, and there are at least 82 surviving copies and 28 incunables from the first printed editions, as well as copies of editions in Italian and German from the sixteenth century. Johannes Schüssler printed the Historiae in Augsburg in 1471. Authoritative modern editions are:

- Orosius, Historiarum adversum paganos libri VII; accedit eiusdem, Liber apologeticus, ed. by Karl Zangemeister, Corpus Scriptorum Ecclesiasticorum Latinorum, 5 (Vienna: Teubner, 1882).
- Pauli Orosii historiarum adversum paganos libri VII, ed. by Karl Friedrich Wilhelm Zangemeister, Bibliotheca scriptorum Graecorum et Romanorum Teubneriana (Leipzig: Teubner, 1899).
- Orose: Histoires contre les païens, ed. by Marie-Pierre Arnaud-Lindet, 3 vols. Collection des Universités de France (Paris: Les Belles Lettres, 1990–1991).

==== Translations ====
- An abridged, free translation into Old English, known as the Old English Orosius, previously erroneously attributed to King Alfred and now thought to have been done in the early tenth century.
- An Arabic translation, known as Kitāb Hurūshiyūsh, reputedly made during the reign of al-Hakam II of Córdoba. This is one of the very few known medieval translations from Latin to Arabic.
- A thirteenth-century Italian translation by the Florentine judge Bono Giamboni.
- A still unpublished fourteenth-century Aragonese translation, made by Domingo de García Martín at the request of Juan Fernández de Heredia, based on Bono Giamboni's Italian translation.
- A French translation of 1491.
- A German translation of 1539.
- The Seven Books of History against the Pagans: The Apology of Paulus Orosius, trans. by Irving Woodworth Raymond (New York: Columbia University Press, 1936) (digitised and corrected version available here)
- Orosius (1964). The Seven Books of History Against the Pagans. Translated by Roy J. Deferrari. Washington DC: Catholic University of America Press. OCLC 711212.
- Seven Books of History against the Pagans, ed. and trans. by A. T. Fear, Translated Texts for Historians, 54 (Liverpool: Liverpool University Press, 2010). ISBN 978-1846312397.

==== Influence ====
The assumed falling out of Paulus Orosius and Augustine at the end of the former's life does not seem to have had a negative effect on the distribution and impact of his Histories. Despite criticisms of his work, Orosius's books were considered to be successes from virtually the day of their publication. Nearly two hundred manuscripts of the "Histories" have survived.

The Histories were considered to be one of the main works of Spanish historiography right up until the time of the Reformation. This success has, to a large extent, meant that Orosius's other works have also been conserved.

Historiae Adversus Paganos has been quoted by authors ranging from Braulio of Zaragoza to Dante Alighieri, and was one of the main books used by students of Ancient History throughout the Middle Ages. Via its Arabic translation, it became one of the sources of Ibn Khaldun in his history. Lope de Vega made Orosius a central character in his play The Cardinal of Bethlehem, which shows how long-lived his fame was.

== Historical methodology ==
=== Universalism ===
The Universalist nature of Orosius's work is perhaps its most notable aspect. In fact, despite the lack of agreement regarding all other aspects of Orosius's life, including his biography and his works, most experts agree on the universalist nature of this work, including classicists such as Marcelino Menéndez y Pelayo and even more modern historians such as Torres Rodríguez. In addition, his works are not only identified as universalist but as the first Christian universalist history, or put another way, the last classical universalist history.

Paulus Orosius is not only a widely studied author he also described his own thoughts on his historical methodology in some of the prologues to the volumes that comprise his "Histories". He was always clear in his objectives, he wanted to write the history starting with the creation and leading up to the times in which he lived, which is a clear declaration of his universalist intentions as a historian.

Orosius uses the so-called "succession of the four world empires theory" throughout his works, which traced world history based on the premise that out of the ruins of one great civilization another arose. Therefore, his theory was based on four historical empires, Babylonia, pagan Rome, Macedonia and Carthage, with a fifth empire, that of Christian Rome as the inheritor of all these. In fact, during the narration of their histories the four empires develop in the same way and there are a number of striking parallels between them that are markedly different from Rome, which Orosius praises.

Orosius's basic innovation in dealing with the four empires theory was to introduce Carthage between Macedonia and Rome, which is something that scholars such as García Fernández point out as one of Orosius's defining and definitive acts.

=== Patriotism and universalism ===
Another important characteristic of Orosius's "Histories" is defined as patriotism. There are two clearly defined positions regarding Orosius's patriotism, a more traditional view espoused by Torres Rodríguez and a more novel view as recently outlined by García Fernández.

Torres Rodríguez’ theory refers to patriotism is the sense that Orosius places special emphasis on the events that took place in Hispania. This is normal given Orosius's origins, but it can be thought of not only as patriotism but also as Hispanism. Examples of this tendency include narratives of events in the "Histories", that occurred in Braga or the fact that Orosius himself was charged with transporting the reliquaries of Saint Stephen. It is even pointed out that Orosius's narrations are sometimes used by current day groups of Galician nationalists.

On the other hand, in 2005 García Fernández made an explicit allusion to Torres Rodríguez’ theory when he stated that it was an exaggeration to characterize Orosius's historical methodology as "patriotic". This was a rejection of nearly all of the statements made by Torres Rodríguez on this matter. García Fernández used the idea of "localism", which was a fashionable idea amongst historians at the beginning of the 21st century. This idea argues that beyond "Hispanism" Orosius shows a "benevolent attitude" to Hispania.

=== Optimism and pessimism ===
Another interesting point is the pessimism with which Orosius deals with certain themes and the exaggerated optimism with which he refers to others. In general he is pessimistic about anything to do with paganism or the past and optimistic regarding Christianity and his present, which is remarkable given the difficult times that he was living in.

These characteristics infuse all the others, it is particularly noticeable in his narration when he places a special emphasis on the suffering of the defeated, and the terrors of war. This characteristic can clearly be attributed to the influence of Augustine, as Orosius is showing us the two sides of a coin in the purest style of Augustinian dualism.

Orosius is thereby able to present the past as a series of adversities with concrete examples, from Noah's flood to the shipwrecking of ships in the Mediterranean Sea, and the future as something positive despite the reality of the times in which he lived.

In order to follow a narrative of suffering and tragedy he often concentrated on defeats, which was different from the usual Roman historiography which normally gave pre-eminence to victories. However, from a historiographical point of view this approach led to some inconsistencies, as, in order to bring the reader round to his point of view, Orosius sometimes described myths and legends as if they were historic fact.

Another traditional criticism of Orosius's work relates to this dichotomy of pessimism/optimism, which often causes him to offer a narrative that in many ways lacks an objective viewpoint. This divides historians into those that view him as biased and others that reject this criticism and justify his approach by saying that Orosius viewed history in the same way as Christians view life. Put another way, his approach is justified as being founded in the author's Providentialist character.

=== Narrative ===
The narrative ability of Orosius should also not be overlooked. The author had a clear objective: that the Christians be defended from the non-Christian Roman's accusations that the sacking of Rome in 410 was a reprimand because the Christians had forsaken the city's traditional pantheon of gods.

Orosius's narrative abilities in forwarding this argument therefore went beyond the pessimism/optimism duality that was discussed in the previous section. His basic idea is that the past is always worse than the present, because it is always further from the true religion.

The fact that he had clear objectives ensured that he wrote his stories with a definite end in mind. Therefore, there are events that he narrated with little detail and others that he presents in full detail. Orosius never seems lacking in sources of information, he even affirms that an historian should be selective with those he has, it rather seems that this difference in level of detail reflects the emphasis that he wants to place on reinforcing his ideas.

The fact that his writing has a moral objective and apologist agenda means that he focuses on unusual events, such as the suffering of the general population during wartime. This selection of facts, in large part, enables him to write about patriotism, for example, as he always pays a lot of attention to events in Hispania.

=== The importance of geography ===
Another important aspect of Orosius's work is the importance he placed on geography in his work as a historian. This is shown in his geographic description of the world in the second chapter of the first of the seven books that comprise the Histories.

One failing of his geographical descriptions is his imprecision, such as, for instance, when he overuses the noun "Caucasus" to refer to other nearby ranges. Despite this vagueness it is notable that the Histories include a chapter on geography. This has lent an increased value to his work in modern historiography, mainly thanks to authors such as Lucien Febvre and Fernand Braudel.

=== Sources used by Orosius ===
The sources Orosius used have been investigated by Teodoro de Mörner; besides the Old and New Testaments, he appears to have consulted Caesar, Livy, Justin, Tacitus, Suetonius, Florus and a cosmography, attaching also great value to Jerome's translation of the Chronicles of Eusebius.

== See also ==
- Bobbio Orosius
