= Rufinus the Syrian =

5th-century theologian, priest and author

"Rufinus [formerly?] of the Syrian nation" as it appears in the only extant copy of Mercator's works, the Collection Palatina. Caroline minuscule, 9th-century, probably Lorsch.

Rufinus the Syrian or Rufinus of Syria (fl. c. 400) was a Christian theologian, priest and author, generally identified as a Pelagian.

According to the anti-Pelagian writer Marius Mercator, Rufinus "of the Syrian nation" (natione Syrus) taught at Rome during the episcopate of Anastasius I (399–401) and through this teaching was a bad influence on the theology of Pelagius and his followers. There is disagreement between scholars over the correct reading of the word preceding natione Syrus: it is either quidam ("a nobody of Syrian race") or quondam ("at one time of the nation of Syria"). Walter Dunphy even argues that whole phrase is ultimately a copyist's error and that there was no Rufinus from Syria.

There are a total of seven references to persons named Rufinus from around 400 and scholars are unsure how many individuals lie behind them. There are three other Rufinuses who are often identified with the Mercator's Syrian Rufinus. If "Syrian" was being used in its broad sense (i.e., of Syria Palaestina), then Mercator's Rufinus may be identical to the Rufinus who was a monk in Bethlehem and went on a mission to the West for Jerome in early 399.

The Syrian Rufinus is usually identified with the Rufinus who wrote the Liber de fide (Book of Faith), which survives in a single manuscript, now MS Q. v. 1. 6 in the Saint Petersburg Public Library. The manuscript describes the author as a priest from the province of Palestine. In this work Rufinus attacks Arianism, Origenism and the doctrine of original sin. The work was for a long time ascribed erroneously to Tyrannius Rufinus. The latter, also called Rufinus of Aquileia, was definitely a different person.

The Syrian Rufinus is usually also identified with the "holy priest" mentioned by Caelestius at his trial in Carthage in 411. At that time the priest was already dead.
