= Robert F. Evans =

Robert F. Evans (1929/1930–1974) was a classical scholar best known for his work One and Holy: The Church in Latin Patristic Thought.

== Works ==
- Evans, Robert F. (2010) [1968]. Pelagius: Inquiries and Reappraisals. Eugene: Wipf and Stock. ISBN 978-1-60899-497-7.
- Evans, Robert F. (1972). One and Holy: The Church in Latin Patristic Thought. S.P.C.K. for the Church Historical Society.
