= Robert Dodaro =

American priest and theologian

Robert John Dodaro O.S.A.

Orders
- Ordination: 19 June 1982 by Jean Jadot

Personal details
- Born: 1955-56

Robert John Dodaro, OSA (born 1955-1956) is an American priest of the Order of Saint Augustine and scholar of the writings of St Augustine of Hippo.

He was born in Pittsburgh to Margaret and William Dodaro, and was raised in the Park Ridge suburb of Chicago.

As a high school seminarian, Dodaro attended St. Augustine Seminary High School, where he met and befriended fellow student Robert Francis Prevost, the future Pope Leo XIV. In the school, the two were known as "the two Bobs." The students were described as "friendly rivals", participating in the school's speech and debate program together, and being co-valedictorians of the class of 1973. Dodaro and Prevost then both transferred to Villanova University, where they were early members of Villanovans for Life, one of the first collegiate Pro-life clubs in the United States. Dodaro graduated summa cum laude from Villanova in 1977. He then went on to graduate studies at Catholic Theological Union in Chicago, completing them in 1982. He was ordained to the priesthood by Jean Jadot at Santa Monica degli Agostiniani on June 19, 1982 and then went on to study at the Patristic Institute Augustinianum in Rome.

Until 2016 he served as the President of the Patristic Institute Augustinianum in Rome, and until 2018 was on the faculty as a Professor of Theology. He was also a Professor of Patristic theology at the Pontifical Lateran University.

He also serves as the Co-Editor-in-Chief of the Augustinus-Lexikon, a Visitor of Ralston College, and on the Editorial Advisory Council of Dionysius. His Christ and the Just Society in the Thought of Augustine was published by Cambridge University Press in 2004, and he was a Co-Editor of Augustine: Political Writings, a collection of letters and sermons by Augustine that deal with political matters, and also of Augustine and His Critics, a collection of essays in honour of Gerald Bonner.

Pope Francis named him a member of the Study Commission on the Women's Diaconate on 2 August 2016.
