= The Myth of Pelagianism =

2018 book by Ali Bonner

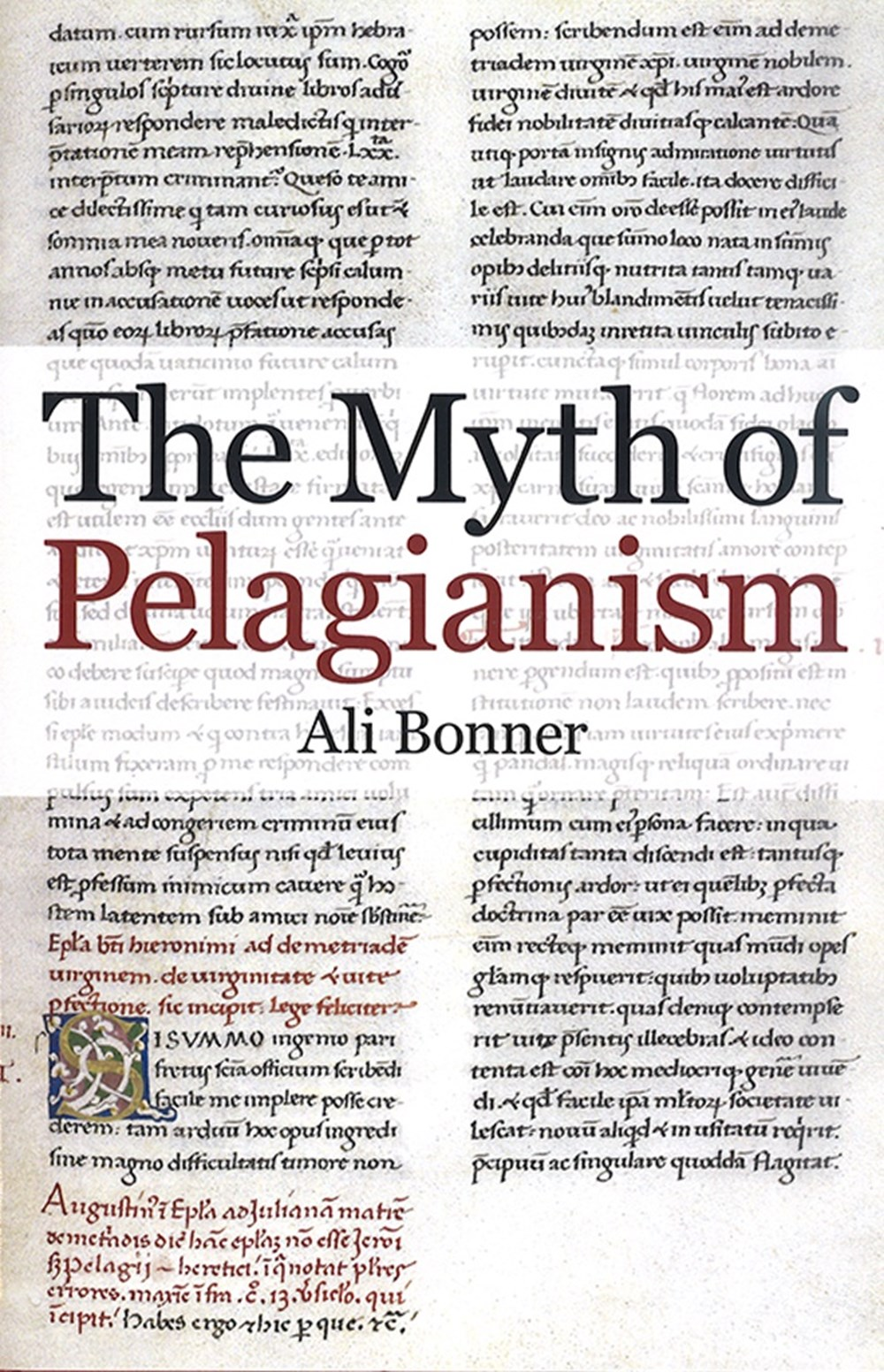
- Author: Ali Bonner
- Language: English
- Subject: Pelagianism
- Genre: Non-fiction
- Publisher: Oxford University Press
- Publication date: 2018

The Myth of Pelagianism (2018) is a book by Ali Bonner which argues that the Christian heresy known as Pelagianism was a "deliberately invented fiction" of its opponent Augustine, rather than an actual doctrine promoted by Pelagius. Bonner also argues that Pelagius' actual positions were orthodox in contemporary Christianity of his time. The book is based on Bonner's doctoral and postdoctoral research and was published by Oxford University Press. It received mixed reviews; some reviewers were not convinced by Bonner's arguments.
