= Augustinian Studies =

- Discipline: Philosophy, theology, history
- Language: English
- Edited by: Ian Clausen

Publication details
- History: 1970–present
- Publisher: Philosophy Documentation Center
- Frequency: Biannual

Standard abbreviations
- ISO 4: Augustin. Stud.

Indexing
- ISSN: 0094-5323 (print); 2153-7917 (web)
- LCCN: 79-141613
- OCLC no.: 1800145

Links
- Journal homepage; Online access

Augustinian Studies is a peer-reviewed academic journal devoted to the study of Augustine of Hippo. Its primary focus is Augustine himself, examined from theological, philosophical, and historical perspectives. Articles that address broader topics related to Augustine, such as studies of other figures, groups, or issues from his time, may also be included. Additionally, the journal publishes the annual Saint Augustine Lecture, held each fall at Villanova University. A special double issue of Augustinian Studies, containing essays on Augustine's City of God, was published in 1999.

The current editor-in-chief is Ian Clausen. The previous editor was Jonathan P. Yates, who replaced Allan D. Fitzgerald in 2012. The journal is published by the Philosophy Documentation Center, in cooperation with the Augustinian Institute at Villanova University.

== History ==
Augustinian Studies was established in 1970. It was originally issued annually before shifting to a biannual frequency. Over its history, the journal has published special thematic issues, including its 1999 double issue on Augustine’s City of God. The journal has consistently been published by the Philosophy Documentation Center.

== Scope ==
The journal publishes scholarly articles on Augustine of Hippo, his writings, and their reception in theology, philosophy, and history. In addition to research articles, it occasionally publishes review essays, bibliographies, and lectures. Its audience includes scholars of patristics, medieval studies, theology, and philosophy.

== Abstracting and indexing ==
Augustinian Studies is abstracted and indexed in Academic Search Premier, L'Année philologique, Arts & Humanities Citation Index, Catholic Periodical and Literature Index, Expanded Academic ASAP, Index Philosophicus, InfoTrac OneFile, International Bibliography of Periodical Literature, International Bibliography of Book Reviews of Scholarly Literature, International Philosophical Bibliography, The Philosopher's Index, PhilPapers, Religious and Theological Abstracts, and Scopus.

== Reception and impact ==
The journal is indexed in major international bibliographies and citation indexes, including Scopus and the Arts & Humanities Citation Index. According to the SCImago Journal Rank (SJR) database, Augustinian Studies is classified within philosophy and religious studies. As of 2023, it has an SJR h-index of 8, meaning that at least eight of its published articles have each been cited at least eight times.

== See also ==
- Augustinus-Lexikon
- Early Christianity
- Patristics
- List of graduate programs in Augustinian Studies
