= Divine Grace and Human Agency =

1997 book by Rebecca Harden Weaver

- Author: Rebecca Harden Weaver
- Publisher: Mercer University Press
- Publication date: 1996

Divine Grace and Human Agency: A Study of the Semi-Pelagian Controversy (1996) is a book about the semi-Pelagian controversy published by Mercer University Press. Its author is Rebecca Harden Weaver (born 1944), professor emerita of church history at Union Presbyterian Seminary. The book got mainly favorable reviews.
