= Lazarus of Aix =

Catholic bishop of Aix-en-Provence, France

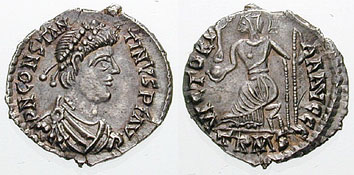

Saint Lazarus of Aix (French: Lazare d'Aix) (d. 441) was the first verifiable bishop of Aix-en-Provence, in France. He was appointed to his bishopric by the usurper emperor Constantine III in 408, and stripped of his office after Constantine was deposed by the future Constantius III in 411. Together with Heros of Arles, who had likewise been appointed by Constantine and deposed by Constantius, he then spent several years in Palestine before returning to Marseille, where he died on 3 August 441.

Although never canonised, he is venerated as a saint thanks to a confusion with his namesake, Lazarus, the friend of Jesus. Some of his relics are preserved in the Abbey of St. Victor, Marseille, where his epitaph is also to be found, and others are kept in Autun Cathedral, which is dedicated to him.

== Sources ==
- Catholic Encyclopedia: Lazarus of Bethany
