= Mark W. Elliott =

Mark W. Elliott is a scholar of religion who teaches at University of St Andrews.

== Works ==
- Elliott, Mark W. (2000). The Song of Songs and Christology in the Early Church, 381-451. Mohr Siebeck. ISBN 9783161473944.
- Elliott, Mark W. (2007). The Reality of Biblical Theology. Peter Lang. ISBN 978-3-03911-356-9.
- Elliott, Mark W. (2016). The Heart of Biblical Theology: Providence Experienced. Routledge. ISBN 978-1-317-02922-9.
- Elliott, Mark W. (2015). Providence Perceived: Divine Action from a Human Point of View. Walter de Gruyter GmbH & Co KG. ISBN 978-3-11-031064-1.
- Elliott, Mark W. (2020). Providence: A Biblical, Historical, and Theological Account. Baker Academic. ISBN 978-1-4934-2218-0.
