= Patristicum =

Pontifical university in Rome, Italy

Coordinates: 41°54′02″N 12°27′28″E

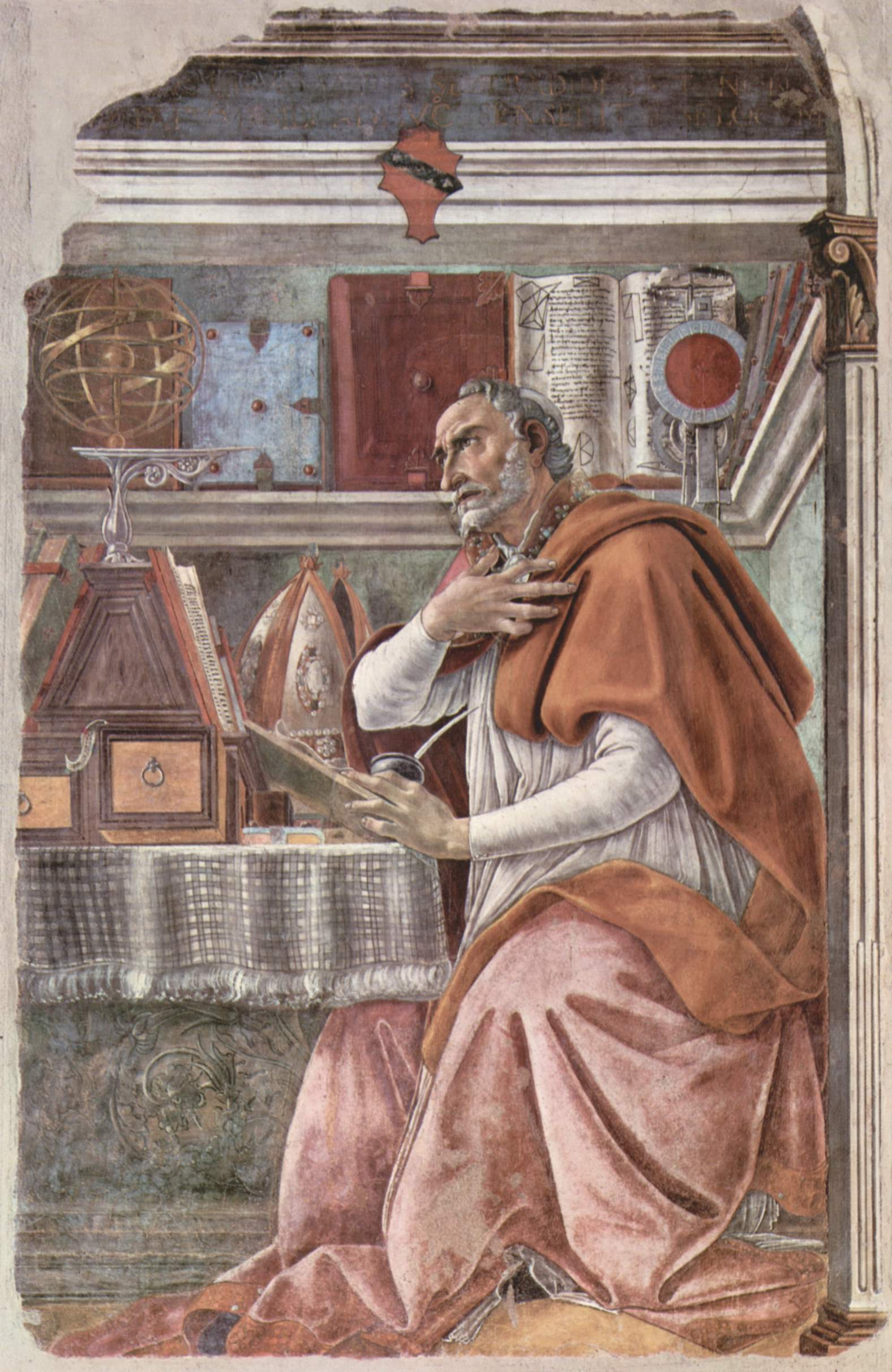
Saint Augustine, in whose honour the Patristic Institute was established.

The Patristicum, officially the Augustinian Patristic Pontifical Institute (Latin: Pontificium Institutum Patristicum Augustinianum) and also known as the Augustinianum, is a pontifical institute in Rome, under the supervision of the Order of Saint Augustine. It is an incorporated institute of the Pontifical Lateran University. It is responsible for the study of patristic theology, the history and theology of the Church Fathers.

== History ==
The Patristicum is considered a direct continuation of the fourteenth-century Studium Generale in Rome which belonged to the Augustinian order, later alongside the Biblioteca Angelica. It was established by the Augustinians and retains the name of Saint Augustine in their honour. In 1873 the two institutions were separated and the forerunner to the Institute moved to its current location on the Via Paolo VI in Rome.

In November 1989, the institute was formally established under the Congregation for Catholic Education. In 2023, Pope Francis granted the institute the title of "Pontifical." Its current president is the Rev. Juan Antonio Cabrera Montero, OSA.

== Publications ==
Augustinianum is the peer-reviewed journal of the Institute. It has been published since 1961. It publishes two issues per year containing original research and reviews related to the study of ancient Christian literature and the Fathers of the Church. In 2010, the Institute announced plans to make the journal available electronically, and all issues are now available online.
