= Eric M. Nelson =

American historian

- Born: August 13, 1977 (age 49); New York, New York
- Title: Robert M. Beren Professor of Government

Academic background
- Education: Harvard University (AB); Trinity College, Cambridge (MPhil, PhD)
- Thesis: 'The Greek Tradition in Early-Modern Republican Thought' (2002)
- Doctoral advisor: Quentin Skinner

Academic work
- Discipline: Political philosophy, government
- Sub-discipline: Thomas Hobbes, American Revolution, English Revolution, Judaism and politics, republicanism, Age of Enlightenment, Hebrew republic

Eric Matthew Nelson (born August 13, 1977) is an American historian and the Robert M. Beren Professor of Government at Harvard University.

== Biography ==
Eric Nelson was born in 1977 and grew up in New York City. According to Harvard Magazine, he went to the Metropolitan Museum of Art every week as a child.

Nelson attended Harvard College, where he was inducted to Phi Beta Kappa as a junior and graduated summa cum laude. His thesis, entitled The Reluctant Humanist: Thomas Hobbes and the Classical Historians won the Hoopes Prize, an award given for exceptional undergraduate theses. While at Harvard, he was a regular columnist for The Harvard Crimson, where he often wrote about the parallels between history and modern day.

After graduating from Harvard, he attended graduate school in the United Kingdom as a Marshall Scholar. Nelson earned an M.Phil. from Trinity College at the University of Cambridge in 2000, where he wrote a thesis on the Greek influence on English Republicanism. Two years later, he earned his Ph.D. from the same college at Cambridge.

Nelson is Jewish, and his grandparents were Holocaust survivors. He served as the Director of the Harvard Center for Jewish Studies from 2012 through 2015. He reads seven languages—English, Greek, Latin, Hebrew, French, Italian, and German—and speaks four of them.

== Career ==
After earning his Ph.D., Nelson taught for another year at Cambridge before returning to Harvard as a Junior Fellow in 2004. By 2009, he was named the Frederick S. Danziger Associate Professor of Government, and was granted tenure one year later at the age of 32. In 2014, he was named the Robert M. Beren Professor of Government. He has also been awarded fellowships by the John Simon Guggenheim Memorial Foundation and the American Council of Learned Societies.

He has published four books since returning to Harvard and is working on a fifth that will explore theology and contemporary liberal philosophy.

Nelson has taught classes at Harvard that cover topics including Thomas Hobbes, the American Revolution, the English Revolution, Jewish political tradition, monarchy, republicanism, and the Enlightenment.

According to Diana Muir, Nelson is "one of a group of scholars engaged in the enterprise of re-evaluating the origins of modern political theory". According to Nathan Perl-Rosenthal, Nelson's Hebrew Republic "demonstrates unforgettably that we need to understand piety to comprehend politics."

Nelson, along with Harry Lewis, Margo Seltzer, and Richard Thomas, wrote an op-ed expressing their opposition to Harvard's proposed policy to ban members of final clubs and other officially unrecognized social clubs from holding captaincies or receiving endorsements for top fellowships.

Nelson has been identified by his Harvard colleague Harvey Mansfield as a "self-professed conservative." He has taught an undergraduate course on "Conservatism and Its Critics," examining the work of Edmund Burke, Mary Wollstonecraft, Samuel Taylor Coleridge, Ford Madox Ford, Friedrich Hayek, Michael Oakeshott, Robert Nozick, and Tom Stoppard.

== Books ==
- The Greek Tradition in Republican Thought, (Cambridge University Press, 2004)
- The Hebrew Republic: Jewish Sources and the Transformation of European Political Thought, Harvard University Press (2010), which received the 2012 Laura Shannon Prize in Contemporary European Studies and was a Choice outstanding academic title of 2010.
- Editor of Hobbes's translations of the Iliad and Odyssey for the Clarendon Edition of the Works of Thomas Hobbes, (The Clarendon Press, Oxford, 2008).
- The Royalist Revolution: Monarchy and the American Founding (Belknap Press, an imprint of Harvard University Press, October 2014)
- The Theology of Liberalism (Harvard University Press, 2019)
