= Augustinianum (journal) =

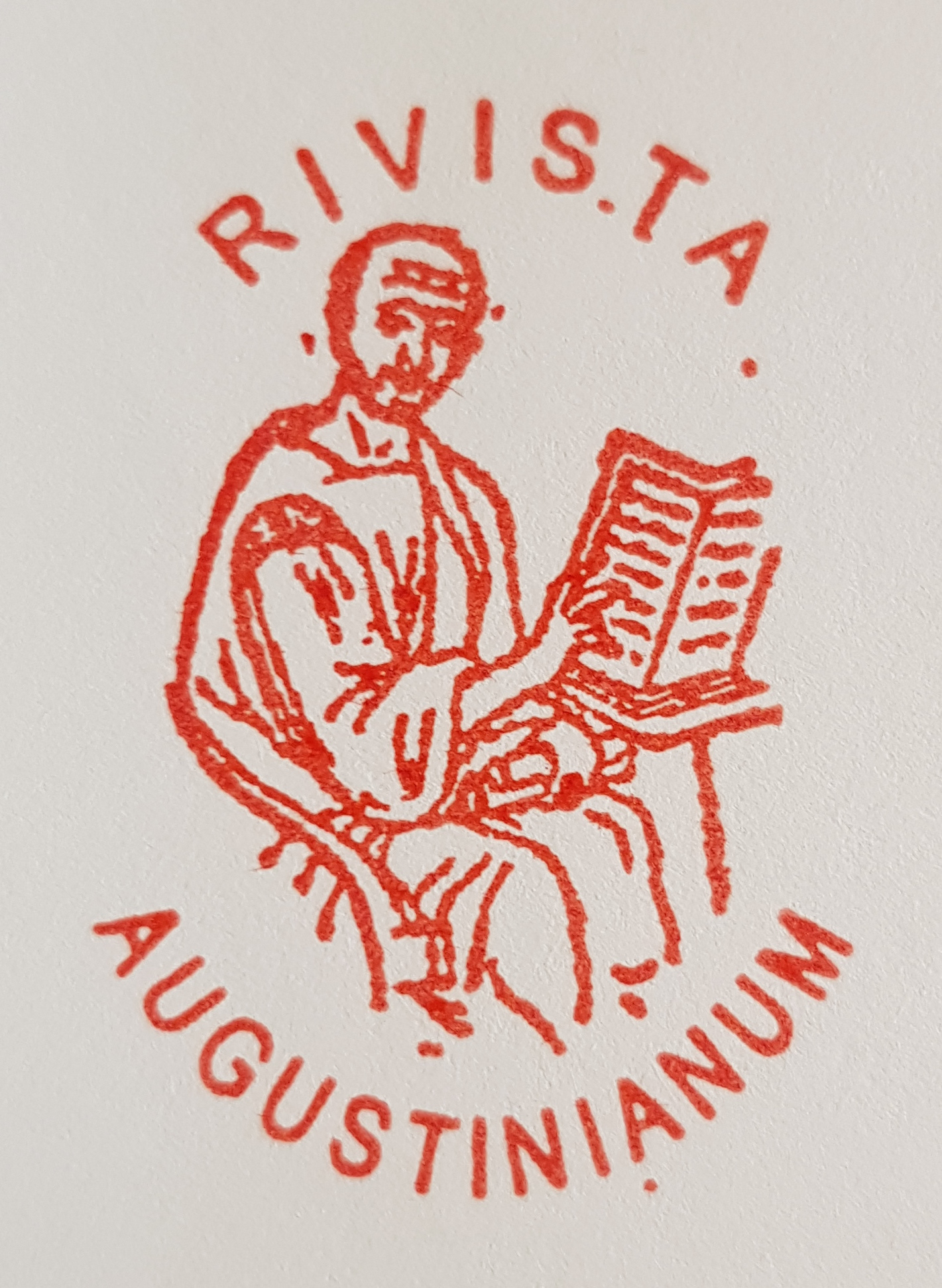
- Discipline: Patristics, Christian theology, religious studies, philosophy
- Language: English, French, German, Italian, Latin, Spanish
- Edited by: Antonio Gaytán

Publication details
- History: 1961–present
- Publisher: Patristic Institute Augustinianum (Italy)
- Frequency: Biannual

Standard abbreviations
- ISO 4: Augustinianum

Indexing
- ISSN: 0004-8011 (print); 2162-6499 (web)
- LCCN: unk81008397
- OCLC no.: 1772009

Links
- Journal homepage

Augustinianum is a biannual peer-reviewed academic journal published by the Patristic Institute Augustinianum (Rome) devoted to the study of the Fathers of the Church and ancient Christian literature. The journal publishes articles, critical editions, and reviews in multiple languages and has been issued since 1961.

== History ==
Augustinianum was established in 1961 and is the official journal of the Pontifical Institute/Patristic Institute Augustinianum in Rome. Early volumes included philological material and editions; from the 1970s the journal increasingly focused on patristic studies and related disciplines.

== Scope ==
The journal covers research on the Fathers of the Church, ancient Christian literature, textual criticism, historical theology, and related fields. Publications include research articles, critical editions, bibliographical work, and review essays. The journal accepts submissions in multiple scholarly languages.

== Abstracting and indexing ==
The journal is abstracted and indexed in L'Année philologique, Atla Religion Database, International Bibliography of Periodical Literature, MLA International Bibliography, Old Testament Abstracts, and ProQuest databases.

== See also ==
- List of theology journals
- Patristics
