= Bibliography of Augustine of Hippo =

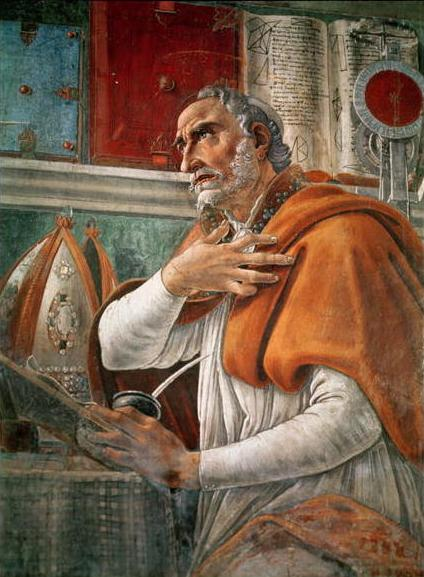
Saint Augustine in His Study by Sandro Botticelli, 1480, Chiesa di Ognissanti, Florence, Italy.

The bibliography of Augustine of Hippo contains a list of works published by fourth-century Christian bishop and theologian Augustine of Hippo.

Augustine was one of the most prolific Latin authors in terms of surviving works, and the list of his works consists of more than one hundred separate titles. He wrote a book before converting to Christianity, De Pulchra et Apto (380), which was already lost by the time he wrote most of his work. They include apologetic works against the heresies of the Arians, Donatists, Manichaeans and Pelagians; texts on Christian doctrine, notably De Doctrina Christiana (On Christian Doctrine); and exegetical works such as commentaries on Book of Genesis, the Psalms and Paul's Letter to the Romans; along with many sermons and letters.

Apart from those, Augustine is probably best known for his Confessions, which is a personal account of his earlier life, and for De civitate dei (The City of God, consisting of 22 books), which he wrote to restore the confidence of his fellow Christians, which was badly shaken by the sack of Rome by the Visigoths in 410. His On the Trinity, in which he developed what has become known as the 'psychological analogy' of the Trinity, is also among his masterpieces. He also wrote On Free Choice Of The Will (De libero arbitrio), addressing why God gives humans free will that can be used for evil.

Towards the end of his life (c. 426–427), Augustine revisited his previous works in chronological order in the Retractationes. The title of this work is often translated into English as Retractions, which can give the erroneous idea that he was "retracting" his earlier works. In fact, the Latin title literally means "re-treatments", and though in this work Augustine suggested what he would have said differently, it provides little in the way of actual "retraction".

== Works ==
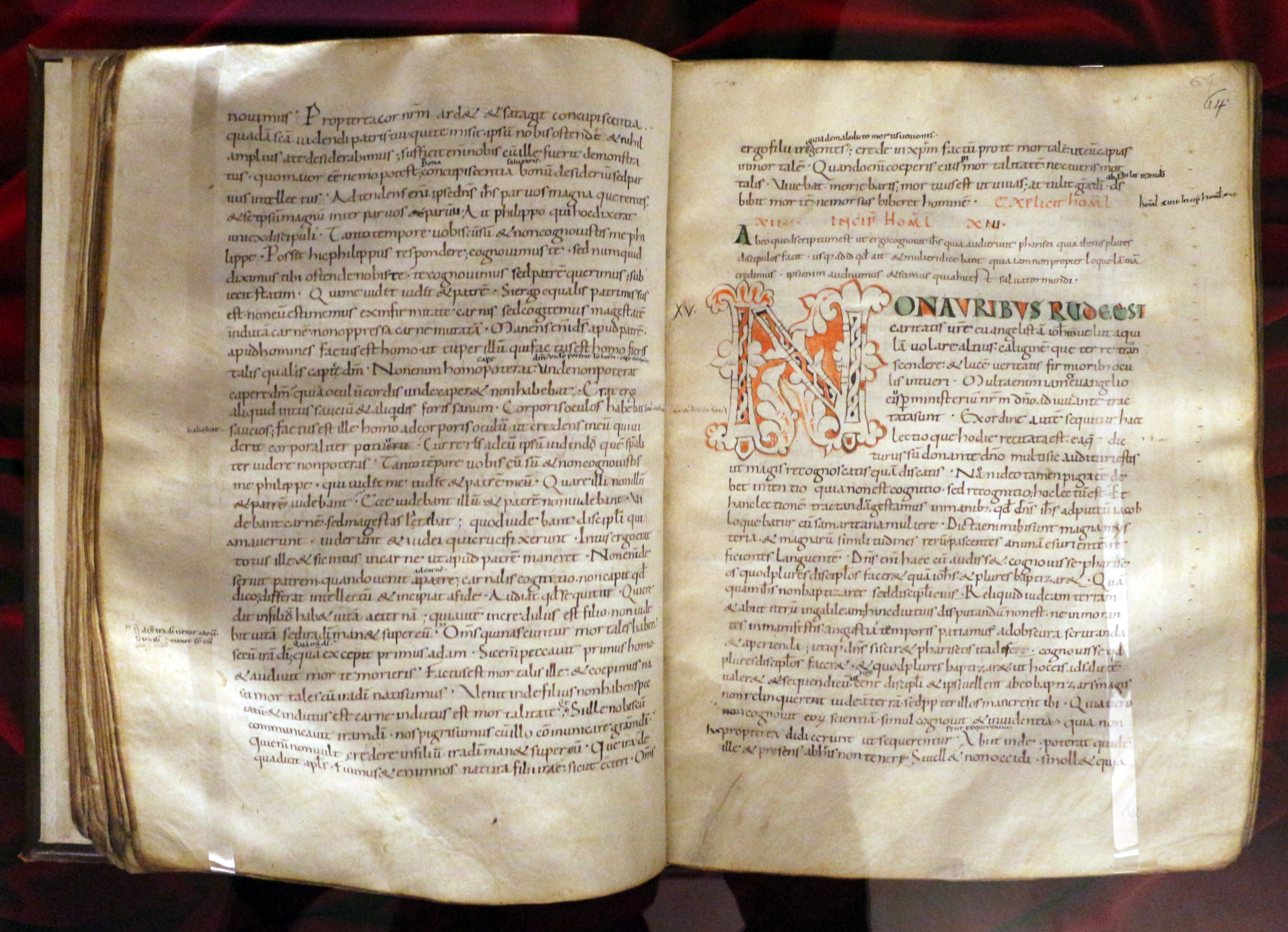
In evangelium Ioannis, 1050–1100 ca., Biblioteca Medicea Laurenziana, Florence

The chronology of Augustine's work is in many cases uncertain, and scholarly estimates of dates may differ.

Latin title	English translation	Approximate date
Contra Academicos	Against the Academics	386/7
De Ordine	On Order	386/7
De immortalitate animae	On the Immortality of the Soul	386/7
Soliloquiorum libri duo	Soliloquies	386/7
De Dialectica	On Dialectic	387
De animae quantitate	On the Magnitude of the Soul	388
De moribus ecclesiae catholicae et de moribus Manichaeorum	On the Morals of the Catholic Church and on the Morals of the Manichaeans	388–389
De musica	On Music	388-390
De magistro	On the Teacher	388–391
De libero arbitrio	On Free Choice of the Will	388-395
De utilitate credendi	On the Profit of Believing	391–392
De duabus animabus [contra Manichaeos]	On Two Souls, Against the Manichaeans	391–392
[Acta] contra Fortunatum [Manichaeum]	Acts or Disputation Against Fortunatus the Manichaean	392
Enarrationes in Psalmos	Enarrations, or Expositions, on the Psalms	392–422
De fide et symbolo	On Faith and the Creed	393
De genesi ad litteram imperfectus liber	The Incomplete Literal Meaning of Genesis	393/4
De sermone Domini in monte	Our Lord's Sermon on the Mount	394
De diversis quaestionibus octaginta tribus	On eighty-three various questions	395
De mendacio	On Lying	395
Contra epistulam Manichaei quam vocant fundamenti	Against the Epistle of Manichaeus Called Fundamental	396–397
De agone Christiano	The Christian Combat	396–397
De doctrina Christiana	On Christian Doctrine	396/7–426/7
Confessiones	Confessions	397–400
De natura boni contra Manichaeos	Concerning the Nature of Good, Against the Manichaeans	399
De catechizandis rudibus	On the Catechising of the Uninstructed	399
De trinitate	On the Trinity	399–419 or 426
De fide rerum invisibilium	Concerning Faith of Things Not Seen	400
De opere monachorum	On the Work of Monks	400
Contra Faustum [Manichaeum]	Reply to Faustus the Manichaean	400
De consensu evangelistarum	On the Harmony of the Evangelists	400
De bono coniugali	On the Good of Marriage	401
De sancta virginitate	On Holy Virginity	401
De Genesi ad litteram	Literal Commentary on Genesis	401/2–416
Contra litteras Petiliani	Answer to the Letters of Petilian, Bishop of Cirta	401–405
De baptismo [contra Donatistas]	On Baptism, Against the Donatists	404
In Iohannis evangelium tractatus	Treatises on the Gospel of John	406–420
In Epistolam Joannis Ad Parthos Tractatus Decem	Homilies on the First Epistle of John	407
De peccatorum meritis et remissione et de baptismo parvulorum	On Merits and Remission of Sin, and Infant Baptism	412
De spiritu et littera	On the Spirit and the Letter	412
De videndo Deo	On Seeing God	412–413
De civitate Dei	The City of God	412–426
De natura et gratia	On Nature and Grace	413–417
De bono viduitatis	On the Good of Widowhood	414
De patientia	On Patience	415–417
De perfectione iustitiae hominis	On Man's Perfection in Righteousness	416
De gestis Pelagii	On the Proceedings of Pelagius	417/8
De correctione Donatistarum	The Correction of the Donatists	417
De gratia Christi et de peccato originali	On the Grace of Christ, and on Original Sin	418
De continentia	On Continence	418–420
De anima et eius origine	On the Soul and its Origin	419/21
De nuptiis et concupiscientia	On Marriage and Concupiscence	419–420
Contra mendacium [ad Consentium]	To Consentius: Against Lying	420
Contra duas epistulas Pelagianorum	Against Two Letters of the Pelagians	420
Enchiridion ad Laurentium, seu de fide, spe et caritate	Enchiridion on Faith, Hope and Love	421
De cura pro mortuis gerenda	On Care to be Had For the Dead	422
De gratia et libero arbitrio	On Grace and Free Will	424–427
De symbolo ad catechumenos	On the Creed: A Sermon to Catechumens	425
De correptione et gratia	On Rebuke and Grace	426/7
Retractationes	Retractations	426–427
De haeresibus ad Quodvultdeum	To Quodvultdeus, On Heresies	428/9
De praedestinatione sanctorum	On the Predestination of the Saints	428/9
De dono perseverantiae	On the Gift of Perseverance	428/9
Contra Iulianum opus imperfectum libri sex	Unfinished Work in Answer to Julian	430 (died while writing)
