= Formulary (model document) =

Medieval collection of models for the execution of documents

Formularies (singular formulary; Latin littera(e) formularis, -ares) are medieval collections of models for the execution of documents (acta), public or private; a space being left for the insertion of names, dates, and circumstances peculiar to each case. Their modern equivalent are forms.

== Rationale ==
It is practically inevitable that documents of the same nature, issued from the same office, or even from distinct offices, will bear a close resemblance to one another. Those charged with the execution and expedition of such documents come naturally to employ the same formulae in similar cases; moreover, the use of such formulae permits the drafting of important documents to be entrusted to minor officials, since all they have to do is to insert in the allotted space the particular information previously supplied them. Finally, in this way every document is clothed with all possible efficiency, since each of its clauses, and almost every word, has a meaning clearly and definitely intended. Uncertainties and difficulties of interpretation are thus avoided, and not infrequently lawsuits. This legal formalism is usually known as the "style" or habitual diction of chanceries and the documents that issue therefrom. It represents long efforts to bring into the document all necessary and useful elements in their most appropriate order, and to use technical expressions suited to the case, some of them more or less essential, others merely as a matter of tradition. In this way arose a true art of drafting public documents or private acta, which became the monopoly of chanceries and notaries, which the mere layman could only imperfectly imitate, and which in time developed to such a point that the mere "style" of a supposititious deed has often been sufficient to enable a skilful critic to detect the forgery.

== Early history ==
The earlier Roman notaries (tabelliones) had their own traditional formulae, and the drafting of their acta was subject to an infinity of detail; the imperial chanceries of Rome and Byzantium were more remarkable still for their formulae. The chanceries of the barbarian kingdoms and that of the papacy followed in their footsteps. Nevertheless, it is usually not directly from the chanceries that the formularies drawn up in the Middle Ages have come down to us, but rather from the monastic and ecclesiastical schools. Therein was taught, as pertaining to the study of law, the art of drafting public and private documents. It was called dictare as opposed to scribere, i. e. the mere material execution of such documents.

To train the dictatores, as they were known, specimens of public and private acta were placed before them, and they had to listen to commentaries thereon. Thus arose the yet extant formularies, between the 5th and the 9th centuries. These models were sometimes of a purely academic nature, but their number is small; in almost every case they are taken from real documents, in the transcription of which the individualizing references were suppressed so as to make them take on the appearance of general formulae; in many instances nothing was suppressed.

The formulae deal with public documents: royal decrees on civil matters, ordinances etc.; with documents relative to legal processes and the administration of justice; or with private deeds drawn up by a notary: sales, exchanges, gifts to churches and monasteries, transference of ecclesiastical property, the manumission of slaves, the settlement of matrimonial dowries, the execution of wills etc. Finally, there are deeds which refer solely to ecclesiastical concerns: consecrations of churches, blessings of various kinds, excommunications, etc.

The study of the medieval formularies is of importance for the history of legislation, the rise of institutions, the development of manners and customs, of civil history, above all for the criticism of charters and diplomas, and for researches in medieval philology. In those times the ecclesiastical and civil orders were closely related. Many civil functions and some of the highest state offices were held by ecclesiastics and monks. The ars dictandi was taught in the schools connected with the monasteries and those under ecclesiastical control. For quite a long time all acta were drawn up only in Latin, and as the vernacular languages, in Romance lands, gradually fell away from classical Latin, recourse to ecclesiastics and monks became a matter of necessity. The formularies are of course anything but models of good Latinity; with the exception of the Letters (Variæ) of Cassiodorus, and the St. Gall collection "Sub Salomone", they are written in careless or even barbarous Latin, though it is possible that their wretched "style" is intentional, so as to render them intelligible to the multitude.

The formularies of the Middle Ages date from the 6th to the 9th or 10th century, and many still survive. Many were edited in the 17th century by Jérôme Bignon, Baluze, Mabillon and others; and many more in the 19th century, especially by two savants who compiled collections of them:

- Eugène de Rozière, "Recueil général des formules usitées dans l'empire des Francs du cinquième au dixième siècle" (3 vols., Paris, 1859–71). He groups these early medieval formulae under five principal heads: "Formulæ ad jus publicum, ad jus privatum, ad judiciorum ordinem, ad jus canonicum, et ad ritus ecclesiasticos spectantes". And he follows up this arrangement by a very complete set of tables of concordance.
- Karl Zeumer, "Formulæ Merovingici et Karolini ævi" (Hanover, 1886) in Monumenta Germaniae Historica: Leg.", V; he reproduces the formulae in the work and gives a more complete study than de Rozière. In his pages will be found a complete bibliography of all written on the subject before that time; or Ulysse Chevalier, Topo-Bibliographie, may be consulted under the word "Formules".

== Various post-Roman traditions ==
Between the 6th and the 9th centuries, various barbarian kingdoms used different formulae.

=== Ostrogoths ===
Cassiodorus, secretary and afterwards prime minister of King Theodoric, included in his "Variarum (epistolarum) libri XII", particularly in books six and seven, and, as he says, for the guidance of his successors, a great number of acta and letters drawn up by him for his royal master. It is a genuine formulary, though standing apart by itself. This collection dates from before 538 (P. L., LXIX). The Servite Canciani took ninety-two of these formulae of Cassiodorus and included them in his "Barbarorum leges antiquæ" (Venice, 1781, I, 19-56).

=== Visigoths ===
Formulæ Visigothicæ, a collection of the forty-Six formulae made under King Sisebut (612-621). The king's name occurs twice in the curious formula xx, a dowry settlement in hexameter verse. Roman and Gothic law are followed either separately or together, according to the nationality of the covenanters. This collection was published in 1854 by de Rozière from a Madrid Manuscript, which was copied in turn from an Oviedo Manuscript of the 12th century, now lost.

=== Franks ===
The Franks had numerous formulae. These included:

- "Formulæ Andecavenses", a collection made at Angers, consisting of sixty formulae for private acta, some of them dating from the 6th century, but the greater number from the early part of the seventh; the last three of the collection belong to the end of the 7th century. They were first edited in 1685 by Mabillon from an 8th-century manuscript preserved at Fulda.
- "Formulæ Arvernenses" (also known as "Baluzianæ", from Baluze, their first editor, who issued the works in 1713), a collection of eight formulae of private acta made at Clermont in Auvergne during the 8th century. The first of them is dated from the consulate of Honorius and Theodosius (407- 422).
- "Marculfi monachi formularum libri duo" is the most important of these collections. The author, Marculf, dedicates the work to a Bishop Landri, whom the 1913 Catholic Encyclopedia identifies with Landericus, the Bishop of Paris (650-656). The first book contains thirty-seven formulae of royal documents; the second, cartœ pagenses, or private acta, to the number of fifty-two. The work, which was well done, was very favourably received, and became popular as an official textbook, if not in the time of the mayors of the palace, at least under the early Carolingians. During the reign of Charlemagne it received a few additions, and was re-arranged under the title "Formulæ Marculfinæ ævi Karolini". Zeumer edited six formulae closely related to this collection.
- "Formulæ Turonenses", also known as "Sirmondicæ" This collection, made at Tours, contains forty-five formulae, two of which are royal documents, many being judicial decisions, and the remainder private acta. It seems to belong to the middle of the 8th century. Zeumer added to the list twelve other formulae taken from various manuscripts.
- "Formulæ Bituricenses", a name given to nineteen formulae taken from different collections, but all drafted at Bourges; they date from 720 to the close of the 8th century. Zeumer added to them twelve formulae taken from the Abbey of Saint-Pierre de Vierzon.
- "Formulæ Senonenses", two distinct collections, both of which were made at Sens, and preserved in the same 9th-century manuscript. The first, "Cartæ Senonicæ", dates from before 775, and contains fifty-one formulae, of which seven are for royal documents, two are letters to the king, and forty-two are private charters. Zeumer added six Merovingian formulae. The second collection, "Formulæ Senonenses recentiores", dates from the reign of Louis the Pious, and contains eighteen formulae, of which seven deal with judicial acts. Zeumer added five metrical formulae, and two Merovingian formulae written in Tironian notes.
- "Formulæ Pithoei" In a manuscript loaned by Pithou to Du Cange for his "Glossarium" of medieval Latin there was a rich collection of at least one hundred and eight formulae, drawn up originally in territory governed by Salic law. This manuscript has disappeared. Under the above heading Zeumer has collected the various quotations made by Du Cange from this formulary.
- "Formulæ Salicæ Bignonianæ", so called from the name of their first editor, Bignon. It contains twenty-seven formulae, one of which is for a royal decree; they were collected in a country subject to Salic law, about the year 770.
- "Formulæ Salicæ Merkelianæ", so called from the name of their editor, Merkel (about 1850), a collection of sixty-six formulae taken from a Vatican manuscript; they were not brought to completion until after 817. The first part (1-30) consists of formulae for private acta, modelled on "Marculf" and the "Formulæ Turonenses"; the second part (31-42) follows the "Formulæ Bignonianæ", the third (43-45) contains three formulae drawn up in some abbey; the fourth (46-66) has formulae dating from the close of the 8th century and probably compiled in some episcopal town. Two formulae of decrees of the bishops of Paris were discovered by Zeumer in the same manuscript.
- "Formulæ Salicæ Lindenbrogianæ", so called from the name of their first editor, Friedrich Lindenbrog, a Frankfort lawyer (1613) who edited them together with other documents. The collection contains twenty-one formulae of private acta, drawn up in Salic law territory. Four others were added by Zeumer.
- "Formulæ Imperiales e curia Ludovici Pii", also known as "Carpenterianæ" from Pierre Carpentier who first edited them in his "Alphabetum Tironianum" (Paris, 1747). This is an important collection of fifty-five formulae, drawn up after the fashion of the charters of Louis the Pious at the Abbey of St. Martin of Tours, between 828 and 832, The manuscript is written mainly in Tironian notes. This collection was used by the Carolingian chancery of the 9th century. Zeumer has added to the list two formulae.
- "Collectio Flaviniensis", one hundred and seventeen formulae compiled at the Abbey of Flavigny in the 9th century; of these, ten only are not to be met with elsewhere.
- "Formulæ collectionis Sancti Dionysii", a collection of twenty-five formulae made at the Abbey of St-Denys under Charlemagne; for the most part it is taken from the archives of the abbey.
- "Formulæ codicis Laudunensis", a Laon (Picardy) manuscript containing seventeen formulae, of which the first five were drawn up at the Abbey of St-Bavon in Ghent, and the remainder at Laon.

=== Alamanni ===
- "Formulæ Alsaticæ", the name of two collections: one made at the Abbey of Murbach (Formulæ Morbacenses) at the end of the 8th century and preserved in a manuscript of St. Gall, containing twenty-seven formulae, one of which is for a royal decree; the other embodying three formulae made at Strasburg (Formulæ Argentinenses) and preserved in a Berne manuscript.
- "Formulæ Augienses", from the Abbey of Reichenau, consisting of three distinct collections: one from the end of the 8th century containing twenty-three formulae of private acta; another belonging to the 8th and 9th centuries contains forty-three formulae of private documents; the third, "Formulæ epistolares Augienses", is a "correct letter-writer" with twenty-six formulae.
- "Formulæ Sangallenses" (from the Abbey of St. Gall), in two collections of this name. The "Formulæ Sangallenses miscellaneæ" consists of twenty-five formulae, many of which are accompanied by directions for their use. They date from the middle of the eighth to the end of the 9th century. The important "Collectio Sangallensis Salomonis III tempore conscripta" is so called because it seems to have been compiled by the monk Notker of St. Gall, under Abbot Salomon III (890-920), who was also Bishop of Constance. Notker died in 912. It contains in forty-seven formulae models of royal decrees, private documents, litterae formatae and other episcopal documents. Zeumer added six formulae taken from the same manuscript.

=== Bavarians ===
- "Formulæ Salisburgenses", a very fine collection of one hundred and twenty-six models of documents and letters, published in 1858 by Rockinger, and drawn up at Salzburg in the early part of the 9th century.
- "Collectio Pataviensis" (of Passau), containing seven formulae, five of which are of royal decrees, executed at Passau under Louis the German.
- "Formulæ codicis S. Emmerami", fragments of a large collection made at St. Emmeram's at Regensburg (Ratisbon).

== Later Roman formularies ==
In Rome the most important of all ancient formularies is certainly the Liber diurnus romanorum pontificum, a collection of one hundred and seven formularies long used by the Apostolic chancery. If it was not drawn up for the papal chancery but copies its documents and is largely compiled from the "Registrum" or letter-book of St. Gregory the Great (590-604). It was certainly in official use by the Roman chancery from the ninth to the end of the 11th century. This collection was known to the medieval canonists, and is often quoted by Cardinal Deusdedit and Yves of Chartres; four of its documents were incorporated into the "Decretum" of Gratian. The best manuscript of the "Liber diurnus", written at the beginning of the 9th century, comes from the Roman monastery of Santa Croce in Gerusalemme and was discovered in the Vatican Library. About the middle of the 17th century, Lucas Holstenius used it when preparing an edition of the work which was officially stopped and suppressed on the eve of its appearance, because it contained an ancient profession of faith in which the popes anathematized their predecessor Honorius. In 1680 the Jesuit Jean Garnier, using another manuscript of the College of Clermont (Paris), brought out an edition of the "Liber diurnus" not approved by Rome (P. L., CV).

In the 19th century the Vatican manuscript was utilized for two editions, one by de Rozière (Paris, 1869), the other by Theodor von Sickel (Vienna, 1889). In 1891, Antonio Maria Ceriani discovered at the Ambrosiana (Milan) a third manuscript as yet unused. For a full bibliography of recent researches concerning the "Liber diurnus" see the "Topo-Bibl." of Chevalier, s. v. While, in its complete form, the "Liberdiurnus" cannot date back further than 786, the earliest forms of it go back to the end of the 7th century. Von Sickel holds that its opening formulae (1-63) are even fifty years earlier than that date. It is badly arranged as a collection, but wonderfully complete. After a series of addresses and conclusions for papal letters, varied according to the addressees, there are formulae concerning the installation of bishops, the consecration of churches, the administration of church property, the grant of the pallium and various other privileges. Then follow models for the official correspondence on the occasion of a vacancy of the Holy See and the election of a pope, also directions for the consecration and the profession of faith of the pope-elect; finally a group of formulae affecting various matters of ecclesiastical administration.

== Later history ==
In the 10th century these formularies cease to be in universal use; in the eleventh, recourse is had to them still more rarely; other methods of training notaries are introduced. Copies of letters are no longer placed before them. In their stead, special treatises of instruction are prepared for these officials, and manuals of epistolary rhetoric appear, with examples scattered here and there throughout the text, or collected in separate books. Such treatises on composition, artes dictaminis, have hitherto been only partially studied and classified, notably by Ludwig von Rockinger in "Briefsteller und Formelbücher des XI. bis XIV. Jahrhunderts" (Munich, 1863). The most ancient of these manuals known to us is the "Breviarium de dictamine" of Alberic of Monte Cassino, about 1075; in the 12th century treatises of this kind become more frequent, first in Italy, then in France, especially along the Loire at Orléans and at Tours.

In addition to these, special treatises were written for the use of clerks in different chanceries, and formularies to guide notaries public. Such are the "Formularium tabellionum" of Irnerius of Bologna in the 12th century, and the "Summa artis notariæ" of Raniero da Perugia in the thirteenth; that of Salathiel of Bologna printed at Strasburg, in 1516, and the very popular one of Rolandino that went through many editions, beginning with the Turin edition of 1479.

At the papal chancery, in general very faithful to its customs and its "style", after the reform of Innocent III many formularies and practical treatises appeared, none of them possessing an official value. The writings of Dietrich of Nieheim (an employee of the chancery in 1380), "De Stilo" and "Liber Cancellariæ", have been the subject of critical studies. At a more recent date many treatises on the Roman chancery and on pontifical letters were published, but they are not formularies, though their text often contains many models.

However, there has appeared an official publication of certain formulae of the Roman Curia, i. e. the collection of formulae for matrimonial dispensations granted by the Dataria Apostolica, published in 1901 as "Formulæ Apostolicæ Datariæ pro matrimonialibus dispensationibus, jussu Emi. Card. Pro Datarii Cajetani Aloisi-Masella reformatæ".

Lastly, in a different order of ideas it may be well to mention a collection of formulae for use in episcopal courts, the "Formularium legalepracticum" of Francesco Monacelli (Venice, 1737), re-edited by the Camera Apostolica (3 vols. fol., Rome, 1834).

From the 12th century onward the formularies of the papal Curia become more numerous but less interesting, since it is no longer necessary to have recourse to them to supplement the documents.

The formularies of the Cancellaria Apostolica are collections drawn up by its clerks, almost exclusively for their own guidance; they interest us only through their relation to the "Rules of the Chancery". The formularies of the Poenitentiaria have a higher interest for us; they appear during the 12th century when that department of Roman administration was not yet restricted to questions of conscience and the forum internum, but served as a sort of clearing-house for lesser favours granted by the Holy See, especially for dispensations. These interesting documents, including the formularies, have been collected and edited by Göller in "Die papstliche Poenitentiarie bis Eugen IV." (Rome, 1907).

Previously, Lea had published "A Formulary of the Papal Penitentiary in the Thirteenth Century" (Philadelphia, 1892), probably the work of Thomasius of Capua (died 1243). The "Summa de absolutionibus et dispensationibus" of Nicholas IV is also important; of particular value also is the formulary of Benedict XII (1336 at the latest), made by order of that pope and long in use. It contains five hundred and seventy letters of which more than two hundred are taken from the collection of Thomasius. Attention is also directed to the list of "faculties" conferred, in 1357, on Cardinal Albornoz, first edited by Lecacheux in "Mélanges d'Archéologie et d'Histoire des écoles françaises de Rome et d'Athènes", in 1898; and to later texts in Göller. The taxœ or "taxes" in use at the Poenitentiaria, to which were occasionally joined those imposed by the Cancellaria, were presumably not in any way related to the formularies.
