= De libero arbitrio voluntatis =

Theological text written by Augustine of Hippo

De libero arbitrio voluntatis (On Free Choice of the Will), often shortened to De libero arbitrio, is a book by Augustine of Hippo which seeks to resolve the problem of evil in Christianity by asserting that free will is the cause of all suffering. The first of its three volumes was completed in 388; the second and third were written between 391 and 395. The work is structured as a dialogue between Augustine and his companion Evodius; it ranges over several topics, and includes an attempted proof of the existence of God.

Intended also as a refutation of Manichaeism, De libero arbitrio denied God's responsibility for sin and emphasised human freedom and accountability. As a result, it became associated with Pelagianism, another doctrine which Augustine considered heretical; he subsequently defended the work by softening its libertarian message. In the 13th century, Thomas Aquinas expanded on the political ideas expressed in this book, and is credited with popularising Augustine's claim that an unjust law is not a law.

== Development ==
Prior to his conversion to Christianity, Augustine had been an adherent of Manichaeism, which taught that the principle of good, God, was eternally opposed by a powerful principle of evil. This dualistic cosmology sought to explain the presence of evil in the world as a result of the conflict between these two deities. Augustine, however, was left unsatisfied by this explanation, and eventually drifted away from Manichaeism to be baptised into the Catholic Church in 387 AD. De libero arbitrio, begun later the same year, was an attempt at a new solution to the problem of evil, one which would preserve Christian monotheism while upholding the goodness and omnipotence of God. This was one of several anti-Manichaean works authored by Augustine around this time, partially in a deliberate attempt to distance himself from his former beliefs.

The book's first volume was completed in 388, while Augustine was living in Rome; the second and third volumes were written between 391 and 395, after he had been ordained a priest in Africa. The work was loosely based on real conversations which Augustine had with his friend and correspondent Evodius, who is made the second character in the dialogue. However, the dialogue format is only inconsistently followed, and Evodius disappears from sight for much of the third volume, while Augustine indulges in a series of extended monologues which anticipate the methods of his later works.

== Summary ==
=== Book One ===
On the first part the dialogue begins with Evodius enquiring of Augustine "whether God is not the cause of evil". In answer, Augustine first distinguishes between evil that is done and evil that is suffered; the latter is caused by God as a punishment for sin, but God is not the cause of sin itself. It would not be just for God to punish sinners if they did not sin of their own free will (ch. I). Augustine goes on to show that all sin arises from evil desire – that is, desire for "those things which cannot be possessed without the risk of losing them" (ch. II–IV). The dialogue progresses examining what is evil and they search for the origin of sin. Adultery, murder and sacrilege are investigated.

This leads to a debate on the question of whether temporal laws are just if they do not condemn all forms of evil desire; the first, second and third reasons which might characterize them as such are dismissed, and, finally, Augustine argues that these laws are just if they derive their principles from the eternal law (ch. V–VI). The eternal law requires that "everything be ordered in the highest degree"; as applied to a person's inner life as well as all else, due to the Divine Providence. Thus, the only actual reason for sin would be passion – the desire for the temporary put before the desire for the Eternal, therefore inverting the order of things as they should be.

Since this is the natural order of things, it is not possible for reason to be overthrown by desire unless it voluntarily submits, in which case the sinner is worthy of punishment (ch. VII–XIV).

On the second part, they discuss the status of men regarding other beings (i.e. animals) and the submission to reason – the wise man.

On the third part, the four virtues are mentioned and the results of either a virtuous life or a sinful one – the very last paragraph introduces the second book.

=== Book Two ===
Evodius next objects that humanity should not have been given free will, if without it there would be no sin and no suffering. In order to prove that free will is a good gift, Augustine sets out to prove that it was given by God, and the first stage of this argument requires him to prove that God exists (ch. I–II).

Anticipating the cogito ergo sum of Descartes, Augustine begins by establishing the existence of the self as a fact that cannot be logically doubted. He then evaluates the various modes of perception, and posits the existence of an inner sense which coordinates the data received through the bodily senses. This inner sense is superior to the bodily senses, because it judges them, and reason is superior to both, for the same reason. If something were proven to exist that is superior to reason but inferior to nothing else, this must be God (ch. III–VI).

Augustine then argues for the objective existence of certain immutable truths, such as the rules of mathematics and the rules of wisdom. Unlike those objects perceived by the bodily senses, immutable truths can be perceived by any number of people at the same time and in the same way. Human reason cannot pass judgement upon truth, and therefore truth is superior to reason (ch. VII–XIV). This means that either truth itself is God, or if something else exists which is higher than truth, this is God – either way, God exists. He acknowledges that this is a "somewhat tenuous form of reasoning", but says it is sufficient for the question at hand (ch. XV).

Augustine next says that all good things must come from God, since everything that exists possesses form, and nothing can form itself (ch. XVI–XVII). If everything created by God is accounted a good, then free will must also be a good. The fact that it is capable of being used wrongly does not disprove this, as the hands, feet and eyes can also be put to wrong uses, but they are still acknowledged to be goods (ch. XVIII). These, however, are lower goods, while free will is an intermediate good, and is only used rightly when it is directed towards higher goods than itself. Evil exists in the movement by which the will is turned from higher goods to lower ones (ch. XIX–XX).

=== Book Three ===
Evodius asks whether or not this movement of the will is natural to it, asserting that if this were the case, a person could not be held morally responsible for turning from higher goods to lower ones. Augustine replies that everyone considers this movement of the will to be blameworthy, and therefore it must have its origin in the will (ch. I). In answer to a new objection by Evodius, he goes on to argue that free will is not invalidated by God's foreknowledge of future events: "God foreknows all the things of which He Himself is the Cause, and yet He is not the Cause of all that He foreknows" (ch. II–IV).

There follows an excursus on the praise owed to God on account of his creation, even if some things in it appear flawed in comparison to others. It is wrong to suggest that anything could have been made differently, as everything has its place in the natural order (ch. V). Everyone desires to exist, so no-one should be ungrateful for having been granted existence (ch. VI–VIII). The order of creation proceeds by degrees from the highest things to the lowest; the world would be imperfect if it did not contain souls that were capable of sinning, nor would it be perfect if sin were not balanced out by punishment (ch. IX–XII). Every nature is inherently good, and to deplore the imperfection of a corrupted nature is to praise the nature itself, and therefore to praise its creator (ch. XIII–XIV). Every soul owes a debt to its creator, and if does not use its gifts rightly, it deservedly forfeits its own happiness (ch. XV–XVI).

Evodius, in his final appearance in the dialogue, asks why some natures sin and not others. Augustine repeats that free will is the only cause of sin. Some sins are committed through ignorance or weakness, but these defects are themselves given as punishment for original sin. It is right that the descendents of Adam and Eve should inherit their punishment, but help is available to anyone willing to accept it (ch. XVII–XIX). Augustine here discusses several theories regarding the origin of the soul (ch. XX–XXI).

Having said that human souls are capable, with God's help, of achieving perfection, Augustine anticipates an objection concerning the untimely death of children, who are given no opportunity to accrue merit or blame. He suggests that children who were baptised before death may be saved by the faith of their relatives, and their sufferings may be necessary in order to inspire their parents to turn towards God. On the related question of animal suffering, Augustine says that by observing the aversion of animals to pain, humankind gains a greater understanding of the fact that all creation strives towards unity (ch. XXII–XXIII).

Finally, Augustine explains that although Adam committed folly by sinning, he was not created with a foolish nature, but existed before the fall in an intermediate state between foolishness and wisdom (ch. XXIV). The fall of Satan occurred due to pride, and is again not to be ascribed to God (ch. XXV). The book ends by affirming the worthlessness of temporal pleasures in comparison with the joy of eternal communion with God.

== Influence ==
From the year 411 onwards, Augustine became involved in a fierce dispute with the British monk Pelagius, who taught that it was possible to lead a good life and achieve salvation purely through the correct use of free will, without any direct assistance from God. In his work De natura, Pelagius had quoted from De libero arbitrio in support of this doctrine. By this time, however, Augustine had come to see divine grace as central to his theology, and believed Pelagius's views to be incompatible with his own. In De natura et gratia, therefore, he claimed that Pelagius had quoted him out of context, and attempted to clarify his meaning. In a later work, Retractationes, written around 427, he again insisted that certain quotes pulled by Pelagius from De libero arbitrio were being misinterpreted:

In these and similar statements which I made, I did not allude explicitly to the grace of God, since this was not the subject of the inquiry; thus the Pelagians suppose, or may suppose, that I was in agreement with their views. But they think this in vain ... Unless the will is freed by the grace of God from the bondage through which it has become a slave of sin ... mortal men cannot live rightly and piously.

Modern scholars are unconvinced by Augustine's claim that the argument of De libero arbitrio is consistent with his later writings, finding that the work does bear strong resemblances to Pelagian doctrine. On the other hand, there are occasional hints within it of some of the ideas about grace which would eventually come to play a much greater role in Augustinian thought.

Thomas Aquinas, writing in the 13th century, was heavily influenced by Augustine's political philosophy. Aquinas' discussion of "the power of human law" in his Summa Theologica contains several quotes from Book One of De libero arbitrio, including: "A law that is not just, seems to be no law at all."
