= Jean Garnier =

French Jesuit church historian, patristic scholar and moral theologian

Reverend Jean Garnier
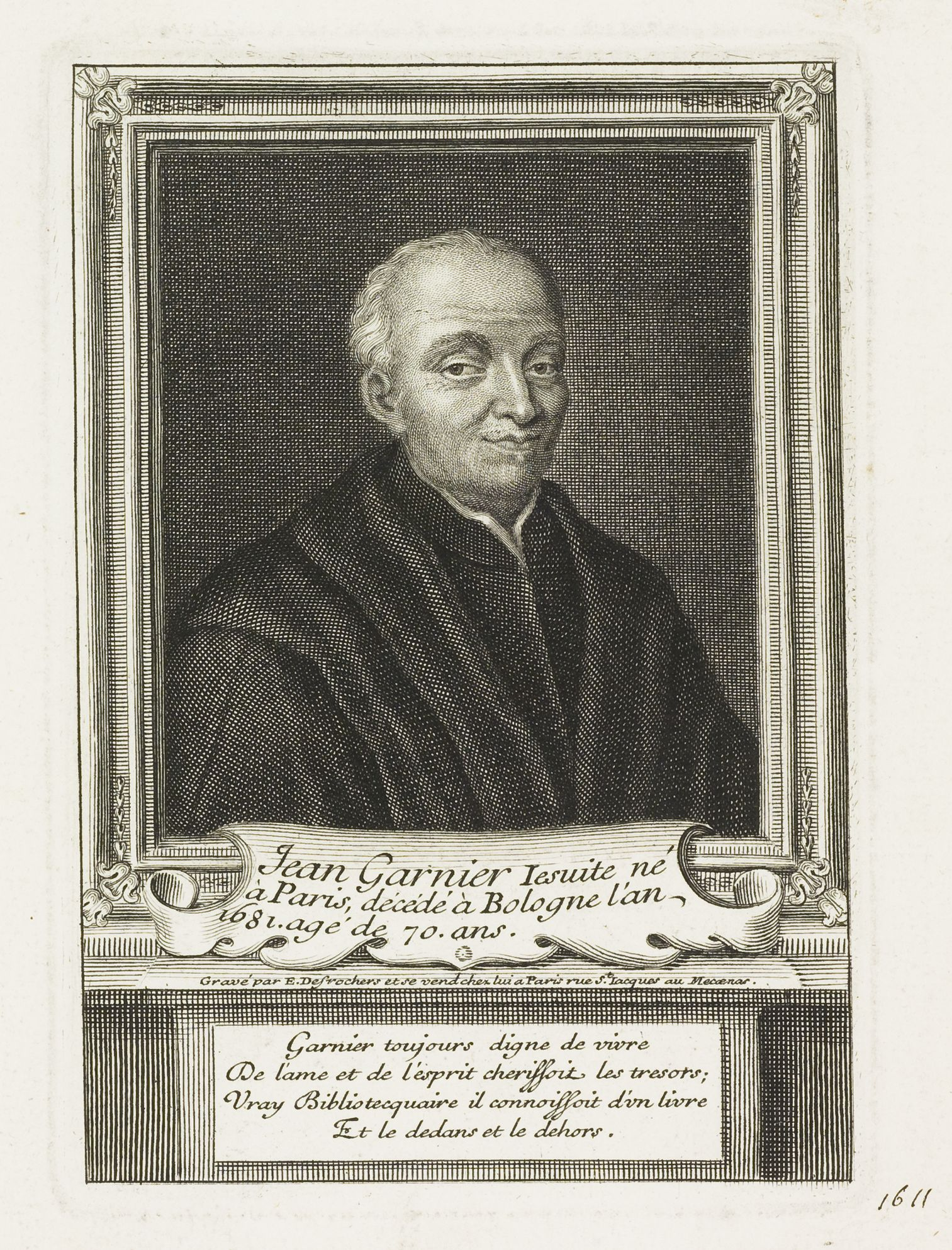
- Portrait of Jean Garnier
- Born: November 11, 1612; Paris, Kingdom of France
- Died: 26 November 1681 (aged 69); Bologna, Papal States
- Occupations: Catholic priest, librarian, Church historian, numismatist
- Known for: Critical editions of the works of Marius Mercator and of the Liber diurnus Romanorum pontificum

Academic background
- Education: Lycée Louis-le-Grand

Academic work
- Discipline: Patristics, Church history
- Influenced: Jean Hardouin

Jean Garnier SJ (French pronunciation: [ʒɑ̃ ɡaʁnje]; 11 November 1612 – 26 November 1681) was a French Jesuit Church historian, patristic scholar, and moral theologian.

== Life ==
He was born in Paris, entered the Society of Jesus at the age of sixteen, and, after a distinguished course of study, taught at first the humanities, then philosophy, at Clermont-Ferrand (1643–1653), and theology at Bourges (1653–1681). In 1681, he was sent to Rome on business of his order, fell ill on the way and died at Bologna.

Garnier was considered one of the most learned Jesuits of his day, was well versed in Christian antiquity, and much consulted in difficult cases of conscience.

== Works ==
In 1618, he published for the first time the Libellus fidei, sent to the Holy See during the Pelagian controversy by Julian, Bishop of Eclanum in Apulia. Garnier added notes and an historical commentary. The Libellus also found a place in Garnier's later work on Marius Mercator.

In 1655, he wrote Regulae fidei catholicae de gratia Dei per Jesum Christum, and published the work at Bourges. In 1673, he edited at Paris all the work of Marius Mercator. The edition contains two parts. The first gives the writings of Mercator against the Pelagians, and to these Garnier adds seven dissertations:

1. De primis auctoribus et praecipuis defensoribus haeresis quae a Pelagio nomen accepit
2. De synodis habitis in causa Pelagianorum
3. De constitutionibus imperatorum in eadem causa 418-430
4. De subscriptione in causa Pelagianorum
5. De libellis fidei scriptis ab auctoribus et praecipuis defensoribus haeresis Pelagianae
6. De iis quae scripta sunt a defensoribus fidei catholicae adversus haeresim Pelagianorum ante obitum S. Augustini
7. De ortu et incrementis haeresis Pelagianae seu potius Caelestianae

Cardinal Noris considered these dissertations of great value, and says that, if he had seen them in time, he would have put aside his own writings on the subject. In the second part, Garnier gives a good historical sketch of Nestorianism from 428 to 433, then of the writings of Mercator on this heresy, and adds two treatises on the heresy and writings of Nestorius, and on the synods held in the matter between 429 and 433. Much praise is bestowed on Garnier by later learned writers for the great amount of historical knowledge displayed in his dissertations, but he is also severely blamed for his arbitrary arrangement of the writings of Mercator and for his criticism of the original.

Garnier edited in 1675 at Paris the Breviarum causae Nestorianorum (composed before 566 by Liberatus, an archdeacon of Carthage), correcting many mistakes and adding notes and a dissertation on the Fifth General Council. In 1678 he wrote Systema bibliothecae collegii Parisiensis S.J., a work considered very valuable for librarians.

In 1680, he edited the Liber Diurnus Romanorum Pontificum from an ancient manuscript, and added three essays:

- De indiculo scribendae epistolae
- De ordinatione summi pontificis, on the case of Pope Honorius, whom Garnier considers free of guilt
- De usu pallii

In 1642, Jacques Sirmond had published in four volumes the works of Theodoret, Bishop of Cyrus (d. 455); Garnier added an Auctarium, which, however, was not published until 1684. It consists of five essays, in which Garnier is severely critical of Theodoret:

1. De ejus vita
2. De libris Theodoreti
3. De fide Theodoreti
4. De quinta synodo generali
5. De Theodoreti et orientalium causa

Another posthumous work of Garnier's, Tractatus de officiis confessarii erga singula poenitentium genera, was published at Paris in 1689.
