= Sicilian Briton =

The Sicilian Briton was an early 5th-century Christian theologian known for his egalitarianism. It is known that he originated from Britain and wrote in Sicily, but his name is unknown.

He wrote six pamphlets, all on the text "If you would be perfect, go, sell what you possess and give to the poor" (Matthew 19:21). In his best known work, De Divitiis ("On Riches") (c. 410), he blamed the existence of poverty on the existence of wealth. He divided people into three categories: the rich, the poor, and those who have enough, and advocated redistributing the excess wealth of the rich so that everyone has enough. This was summarised in the slogan: tolle divitem et pauperem non invenies ("abolish the rich and you will find no more poor"). His views can be considered an early form of socialism.

He was associated with his fellow Briton Pelagius, although Pelagius distanced himself from the Sicilian Briton's more radical doctrines.
