= Liber diurnus Romanorum pontificum =

Collection of ecclesiastical formulae

Liber diurnus Romanorum pontificum (Latin for "Journal of the Roman Pontiffs") is the name given to a miscellaneous collection of ecclesiastical formulae used in the Papal chancery until about the 11th century. It fell into disuse through the changed circumstances of the times and was soon forgotten and lost.

== Description ==
The collection contains models of the important official documents usually prepared by the papal chancery; particularly of letters and official documents in connexion with the death, the election, and the consecration of the pope; the installation of newly elected bishops, especially of the suburbicarian bishops; also models for the profession of faith, the conferring of the pallium on archbishops, for the granting of privileges and dispensations, the founding of monasteries, the confirmation of acts by which the Church acquired property, the establishment of private chapels, and in general for all the many decrees called for by the extensive papal administration. The collection opens with the superscriptions and closing formulae used in writing to the Emperor and Empress at Constantinople, the Patricius, the Exarch and the Bishop of Ravenna, to a king, a consul, to patriarchs, metropolitans, priests and other clerics. The collection is important both for the history of law and for Church history, particularly for the history of the Roman Church. The formularies and models set down are taken from earlier papal documents, especially those of Gelasius I (492–496) and Gregory I (590–604).

The Vatican manuscript contains 99 formularies, the Clermont 100 and the Ambrosian 106. Each manuscript has formularies that are not in the others. All "seem to be free reelaborations, mainly for monastic use, of official texts from the papal curia and the perhaps most famous and authoritative episcopal ones, for study in the schools of the monasteries and repeatedly updated for this purpose" (Vatican Archives). In other words, they served more or less as style books.

== Genesis and Use ==
The collection contains some 100 formulae, some of which may date back to the late fifth century. They may have been collected in the chancery of the Roman Church and added to from time to time. There is no systematic arrangement of the formularies in the manuscripts. Internal evidence shows that some formulae were reworked occasionally.

Whether the collection was used by the papal chancery is contested. Scholars agree that papal letters written after the late eleventh century do not draw on the Liber diurnus.

In the late eleventh century, Cardinal Deusdedit copied several formulae from an unknown version of the Liber diurnus into his canon law collection. Internal evidence suggests that this version was reworked in the eleventh century. It is not clear whether Deusdedit faithfully preserved the Liber diurnus version he used or made changes to it. Later medieval knowledge of the Liber diurnus largely depends, often indirectly, on Deusdedit's collection, from where the excerpts were taken into the collections of Ivo of Chartres and, ultimately, Gratian.

== Manuscripts ==
There are three medieval manuscripts containing the Liber diurnus extant. They are known as the Codex Vaticanus, Claromontanus, and Ambrosianus, respectively, or abbreviated as manuscripts "V", "C", and "A".

- The Vaticanus (V) today is held in the Vatican Archives (Misc., Arm. XI, 19). It was held at Nonantola Abbey before it came to Rome, where it was discovered in 1646 in the library of the monastery of Santa Croce in Gerusalemme; in the eighteenth century, it was brought to the Vatican. It was said to be lost in the nineteenth century by Theiner. Holstenius is said to have copied it.
- The Claromontanus (C) today is kept in Egmond Abbey in the Netherlands (Ms. G II). It was in the Jesuit library at Clermont in the seventeenth century but disappeared after 1746 as a result of the suppression of the Society of Jesus; in 1937 it was rediscovered. A paper copy made from this codex is today lost.
- The Ambrosianus (A), originally from Bobbio, today is kept by the Ambrosian Library at Milan (I 2 sup.). It was unknown to scholarship until the end of the nineteenth century.

Date and place of origin of the manuscripts are contested. Scholars agree that the codices were produced in Italy (though not in Rome) in the early Middle Ages. No extant manuscript refers to the collection as Liber diurnus; this title is found only in Deusdedit's canon law collection.

== History of the Printed Editions ==
The Liber diurnus had an unusually complicated textual history in modern times. From the sixteenth to the twentieth centuries, various printed editions of the Liber diurnus have been made. They differ substantially in accuracy and content.

The first scholar to edit the Liber diurnus was Lucas Holstenius. He had discovered Codex V in the monastery of Santa Croce in Gerusalemme in Rome, and also obtained Codex C from the Jesuit Collège de Clermont in Paris. Pressure from the ecclesiastical censors led to the edition printed at Rome in 1650 being withheld from publication, the copies being stored at the Vatican. The reason for so doing was apparently formula lxxxiv, which contained the profession of faith of the newly elected pope, in which the latter recognized the Sixth General Council and its anathemas against Pope Honorius for his Monothelism. In other words, it appeared to acknowledge that a pope was capable of heresy. After Garnier's edition appeared in 1680, Benedict XIII in 1725 permitted the issue of some copies of Holstenius' text, but only in incomplete form and with a title page containing the wrong publication date "1658".

The second edition was made by the Jesuit Jean Garnier from Codex C (Paris 1680). The edition is very inaccurate, and contains arbitrary alterations of the text. In his Museum Italicum (I, II, 32ff) Jean Mabillon and Michel Germain, who had seen Codex V during their stay in Rome in 1685, corrected many of Garnier's errors and printed some formulae anew. Some reprints of Garnier's edition integrated these corrections, namenly the editions Basle 1741, Vienna 1762, and that by Jacques-Paul Migne in his influential Patrologia Latina (vol. 105; Paris, 1851).

A more reliable edition was published by Eugène de Rozière in 1869. It is based on the previous editions and Codex V, at the time thought to be the only medieval copy still extant. However, de Rozière did not see V himself but had collaborators check Garnier's edition against it.

Theodor von Sickel prepared a critical edition based mainly on Codex V (but taking into account Deusdedit and earlier editions as well) which was published in 1889. Just after the appearance of this work, however, Antonio Maria Ceriani announced the discovery of a new manuscript, originally from Bobbio, in the Ambrosian Library at Milan; towards the end this was more complete than the Vatican manuscript. Nonetheless, von Sickel's edition remains the only critical edition of the Liber diurnus.

It is sometimes claimed that another edition based on Codex A was published in Milan in 1891 by Achille Ratti, a younger collaborator of Ceriani, and later to become Pope Pius XI. Apparently the edition was never published.

In 1921 a facsimile edition of Codex V was published.

A diplomatic edition based on all three manuscripts was published in 1958 by Hans Foerster.

== Research ==
Theodor von Sickel, in the "Prolegomena" to his 1889 publication of the text of the Vatican manuscript (the only one then known to exist) showed that the work possesses by no means a uniform character. He recognized in it three divisions, the first of which he ascribes to the time of Honorius I (625–638), the second to the end of the seventh century, and the third to the time of Hadrian I (772–795). For his part Louis Duchesne (Bibliothèque de l'Ecole des Chartes, LII (1891) 7ff) differed from Sickel, and maintained that the original version of most of the formularies, and among them the most important, must be referred to the years after 682, and that only the last formularies (nn. lxxxvi-xcix) were added in the time of Hadrian I, though some few of these may have existed at an earlier date.

Hartmann defended the views of Sickel (Mitteilungen des Instituts für österreichische Geschichte 13 (1892) 239ff). Friederich (Sitzungsberichte der bayerischen Akademie der Wissenschaften zu München, Phil.-hist. Kl., I (1890) 58ff.) investigated more closely the case of some of the formularies attributed by Sickel to one of the aforesaid periods, and attempted to indicate more nearly the occasions and pontificates to which they belonged. These investigations established beyond doubt that the collection in the Vatican manuscript had already attained its present form towards the end of the 8th century, though a significant portion had been compiled during the 7th century.

Sickel believed that the manuscript now in the Vatican Archives was the actual text used in the papal chancery. That hypothesis has now been abandoned, especially since it has been shown that this manuscript reached the library of Santa Croce in Gerusalemme from that of the Benedictine monastery of Nonantola.

== Editions ==
Liber diurnus Romanorum Pontificum ex antiquissimo codice ms. nunc primum in lucem editus, ed. Lucas Holstenius (Rome 1650). Incomplete reprint with a new title page and the wrong date "1658".

Liber diurnus romanorum pontificum, ed. Jean Garnier (Paris 1680).

Museum Italicum seu Collectio veterum scriptorum ex bibliothecis Italicis, vol. 1, ed. Jean Mabillon and Michel Germain (Paris 1724).

Liber diurnus, ou Recueil des formules usitées par la Chancellerie Pontificale du Ve au XIe siècle, ed. Eugène de Rozière (Paris 1869).

Liber diurnus romanorum pontificum ex unico codice Vaticano, ed. Theodor Sickel (Vienna 1889).

Il codice Ambrosiano del Liber diurnus Romanorum pontificum, ed. Luigi Gramatica ([Milan] 1921).

Liber diurnus Romanorum pontificum: Gesamtausgabe, ed. Hans Foerster (Bern 1958).
