= Leudesamium =

Oath of loyalty in Merovingian times

The leudesamium was an oath of allegiance sworn by free men, particularly warriors, to the Merovingian king during the Early Middle Ages.

This oath, which formalized a personal, unilateral, and unconditional bond, was fundamental to the structure of royal power and reinforced the loyalty of the faithful to the sovereign.

The term leudesamium is attested in 7th-century texts, notably in the Formulary of Marculf, which mentions the oath sworn by all free inhabitants of the king's territory, whether Franks, Romans, or of other nations.

This oath implied that the leude pledged not to harm the king and to follow him on military campaigns, in exchange for the king's protection, known as mainbour.

The term leudesamium comes from the Late Latin leudes, itself derived from the Frankish leudi, with a Germanic root common to words like the German Leute (people) or the Old English leode (people).

It is a borrowing from Late Latin attested as early as the 16th century in French, with the first mentions in the works of Étienne Pasquier in 1569 and Cotgrave in 1611. The oath was required of all free men, and its renewal was regularly demanded by the king to demonstrate the aristocracy's adherence to his authority.

From the mid-8th century onward, under the Carolingian kingdom and empire, the role of the oath was reinforced and generalized. Charlemagne's capitularies, beginning in 786, affirmed that oaths were necessary for governance and required their repetition by all men over the age of twelve, with the names of those who took the oath being recorded.

Unlike the Merovingian oath, which was primarily linked to the person of the prince, the Carolingian oath now encompassed "the kingdom and its law" in the obligation of loyalty, and Charlemagne ensured his monopoly on this oath, prohibiting private or collective oaths that could create intermediate loyalties.
