= Marius Mercator =

Latin Christian ecclesiastical writer

Marius Mercator (born probably in Northern Africa about 390; died shortly after 451) was a Latin Christian ecclesiastical writer best known for his advocacy of Augustinian theology during the Pelagian controversy.

In 417 or 418, he was in Rome where he wrote two anti-Pelagian treatises, which he submitted to Augustine of Hippo. He received epistula 193 from Augustine around 418. From 429 until about 448 he was in Constantinople. In 429 he was described as a servus Dei. His works, mostly translations and compilations of excerpts from heretical as well as orthodox Greek theological writers, were edited by Jean Garnier (Paris, 1673), reprinted in Migne (Patrologia Latina, XLVIII, Paris, 1846). They were also edited by Baluze (Paris, 1684), reprinted with corrections in Andrea Gallandi, "Bibliotheca veterum Patrum", VIII (Venice, 1772), 613–738. His treatises "Commonitorium super nomine Cælestii", and "Commonitorium adversus hæresim Pelagii et Cælestii vel etiam scripta Juliani" are against the Pelagians. The former effected the expulsion of Julian of Eclanum and Cælestius from Constantinople and their condemnation at Ephesus in 431.

Against the Nestorians he wrote Epistola de discrimine inter hæresim Nestorii et dogmata Pauli Samosateni, Ebionis, Photini atque Marcelli and Nestorii blasphemiarum capitula XII. Among his translations are extracts from Cyril of Alexandria, Nestorius, Theodore of Mopsuestia, Theodoret, Pelagius, and others.
