= Paulinus the Deacon =

Roman biographer

Paulinus the Deacon, also Paulinus of Milan was the notary of Ambrose of Milan, and his biographer. His work is the only life of Ambrose based on a contemporary account, and was written at the request of Augustine of Hippo; it is dated to 422 AD.

== Against the Pelagians ==
In Carthage in 411 he had opposed Caelestius, a Pelagian. The formal proceedings were described by Augustine in On Original Sin. Paulinus set up six theses defining Pelagian views as heresy; Caelestius gave up on becoming a presbyter in Carthage, instead he moved to Ephesus

Paulinus was summoned to Rome in 417, to justify himself. With local backing, he declined to appear before Pope Zosimus; in 418 the Pope took into account the measure of support for the anti-Pelagian position, and condemned both Caelestus and Pelagius.
