= Pseudo-Basil =

Authors falsely believed to be Basil of Caesarea

Pseudo-Basil is the designation used by scholars for any anonymous author of a text falsely or erroneously attributed to Basil of Caesarea. Pseudo-Basilian works are usually known by Latin titles. They are often misattributed only in translation. They include:

- Ad Caesarienses apologia de secessu, a letter actually by Evagrius Ponticus
- Ad Chilonem discipulum suum
- Admonitio ad filium spiritualem, a Latin text and a partial Old English translation
- Admonitio ad iuniores
- Canones, an Arabic text and some Coptic fragments
- Constitutiones asceticae
- Contra Eunomium 4–5 (books 1–3 are authentic)
- De consolatione in adversis
- De reliquis Dionysii, the sequel to an authentic letter to Ambrose of Milan
- De spiritu
- De virginitate ad Letoium, an Old Church Slavonic translation from Greek, actually by Basil of Ancyra
- De vita in Christo, a Coptic translation from Greek, also misattributed to Athanasius
- Dialogus IV de sancta Trinitate, an Armenian translation from Greek and Syriac fragments, also misattributed to Athanasius
- Doctrina, quoted in the Georgian Ethika of Euthymius the Athonite
- Epitimia
- Epitimia diversorum sanctorum de refectorio
- Erotapokriseis Basilii et Gregorii, an Arabic translation from Greek of an erotapokriseis sometimes also misattributed to John Chrysostom
- Liturgia sancti Basilii alexandrina, a Greek liturgy of the Alexandrian rite, also known in Arabic, both Bohairic and Sahidic Coptic and Ethiopic versions
- Transitus de dormitione Deiparae, a Georgian translation from Greek

Numerous apocryphal Basilian letters exist: to Bishop Eusebius of Samosata; to Eustathius, archiatrus and son of Oribasius; to Bishop Innocent of Tortona; to the Emperor Julian the Apostate; to Libanius; "to a lapsed monk" (ad monachum lapsum); to the Emperor Theodosius I; to the monk Urbicius on continence; and "to a widow" (ad viduam).

In addition, some passages in the Rule of Saint Basil are inauthentic.
