= Assumption of Moses =

Jewish pseudepigraphical work possibly alluded to in Jude 1:9

A 1928 version of this work.

The Assumption of Moses, also known as the Testament of Moses (Hebrew עליית משה Aliyat Mosheh), is a 1st-century Jewish apocryphal work. It contains secret prophecies Moses revealed to Joshua before passing leadership of the Israelites to him. It is characterized as a "testament", meaning the final speech of a dying person, Moses.

The text is thought to have been originally written in Hebrew or another Semitic language, and then translated to Koine Greek. The only surviving manuscript is a 6th-century Latin translation of the Greek text. The manuscript was incomplete, and the rest of the text is lost. From references in ancient works, it is thought that the missing text may have depicted a dispute over the body of Moses, between the archangel Michael and Satan. Seth and Joshua and several witnesses saw lightning strike in front of the black-clothed stranger who was watching over the body of Moses. As the dust of the earth settled, a Roman-like soldier wearing silver and gold armor appeared, who tripped the stranger, causing him to fall over his own feet. Michael took the body of Moses and walked away, but as Seth gave chase, they just disappeared.

== Manuscript history ==
The Assumption of Moses is known from a single sixth-century incomplete manuscript in Latin that was discovered by Antonio Ceriani in the Biblioteca Ambrosiana in Milan in the mid-nineteenth century and published by him in 1861.

== Identification ==
The two titles of this manuscript are due to different identifications with lost texts. The Stichometry of Nicephorus and some other ancient lists refer to both a Testament of Moses and an Assumption of Moses, apparently as separate texts.

- Ceriani, and later Tromp with him, identified the manuscript with the Assumption of Moses (which is also called the Ascension of Moses) due to a match of verse 1:14 with a quotation included in the Historia Ecclesiastica of Gelasius of Cyzicus. This apocryphal work, entitled פטירת משה in Hebrew, and ᾽Ανάληψις or ᾽Ανάβασις Μωυσέως in Greek, is also mentioned by other ancient writers, including Athanasius (in his Synopsis Sacræ Scripturæ) and Origen;
- Charles, in his edition of 1897 suggests that the manuscript shall be identified with the Testament of Moses, because the extant text does not describe any assumption of Moses to heaven, but simply contains the last exhortations of Moses (thus his testament). Charles furthermore suggests that these two separate texts were later united to form a single work.

== Relation to the Epistle of Jude ==
Some ancient writers, including Gelasius of Cyzicus (2,21,7) and Origen in De principiis III:2,1 cite the Assumption of Moses regarding the dispute over the body of Moses, referred to in the Epistle of Jude 1:9, between the archangel Michael and the devil.

This dispute does not appear in Ceriani's manuscript, which could lend support to the identification of the manuscript with the Testament of Moses but could also be explained by the text's incompleteness (it is believed that about a third of the text is missing).

An alternative explanation is that Jude is compounding material from three sources:

- general Jewish traditions about Michael as a gravedigger for the just as in the Apocalypse of Moses
- contrast with the accusation by Michael of Azazel in the Book of Enoch
- the angel of the Lord rebuking Satan over the body of Joshua the High Priest in Zechariah 3.

This explanation has three arguments in favour: (1) Jude quotes from both 1 Enoch 1:9 and Zechariah 3. (2) Joshua in Zechariah 3 is dead - his grandson is serving as the high priest. The change from the "body of Jesus" to the "body of Moses" would be required to avoid confusion and to reflect the historical context of Zechariah 3 in Nehemiah concerning intermarriage and corruption in the "body" of the priesthood. (3) The example of Zechariah 3 provides an argument against the "slandering of heavenly beings", since the Angel of the Lord does not do in Zech. 3 what Michael is reported to do in 1En1.

== Content ==
The text is in twelve chapters:

- In Chapter 1 Moses, before dying, chooses Joshua as successor and leaves him the books he shall preserve to the end of days, when the Lord will visit his people. The role of Moses as mediator is highlighted.
- Chapters 2–5 contain a brief outline of Jewish history up to Hellenization under Antiochus IV. This is narrated in the form of foretelling.
- Chapter 6 predicts easily recognizable figures, including the Hasmonean and Herod the Great with his sons. The history follows up to the partial destruction of the Temple.
- Chapter 7 is about the end of days, but the manuscript is too fragmented to fully understand the text.
- Chapter 8 narrates a great persecution of Jews at the hands of hypocrites. Some scholars read this as an eschatological prophecy, while others, like Charles, interpret this as events that happened before the Maccabee rebellion. Charles also suggests that chapters 8 and 9 were originally located between chapters 5 and 6.
- In Chapter 9 the narrative follows with a description of a Levite man named Taxo and his seven sons, who, rather than give in to hellenizing influences, seal themselves into a cave.
- Chapter 10 contains an eschatological hymn: At the end of the times God will arise, punish the Gentiles, and exalt Israel. Before the coming of God a messenger (Latin nuntius) with sacerdotal tasks is prophesied, who will avenge Israel.
- Chapters 11 and 12 conclude the text with Moses exhorting Joshua not to fear, as history fully provides for God's covenant and plan.

== Date, original language and themes ==
Due to the vaticinia ex eventu, most scholars date the work to the early 1st century AD, contemporary with the latest historical figures it describes. These sections appear to be familiar with the death of Herod the Great, suggesting that at least these sections date from between 4 BCE–30 CE. Other scholars date the work to the previous century and suggest that the 1st-century references in Chapters 6 and 10 were later insertions.

Based on the literal translation of idioms within the text, it is generally accepted that the extant Latin version is a translation from Koine Greek, with the Greek itself probably a translation from Hebrew or at least a text with considerable Semitic influence.

There are no theological peculiarities to help us attribute the text to any specific Jewish group.

- The main theme is the apocalyptic determinism of a history that unfolds according only to God's plan, regardless of the acts of either the Israelites or the Gentiles. Another theme is the figure of Moses, who is shown as a mediator and intercessor between God and humanity.
- Charles (1911) finds the most striking feature in this work to be the writer's scathing condemnation of the priesthood before, during, and after the Maccabean period and an unsparing deprecation of the Temple services.

== See also ==
- Non-canonical books referenced in the Bible
- Sixth and Seventh Books of Moses

== Sources ==
- Tromp, Johannes (1997) The Assumption of Moses: A Critical Edition With Commentary Brill Academic Publishers. ISBN 90-04-09779-1
- J. Priest Testament of Moses, a new Translation and Introduction in ed. James Charlesworth The Old Testament Pseudepigrapha, Vol 1 ISBN 0-385-09630-5 (1983)
- D. Maggiorotti Testamento di Mosè in ed. P.Sacchi Apocrifi dell'Antico Testamento Vol 4 ISBN 88-394-0587-9 (2000)
