= Lucas Holstenius =

German historian and humanist (1596–1661)

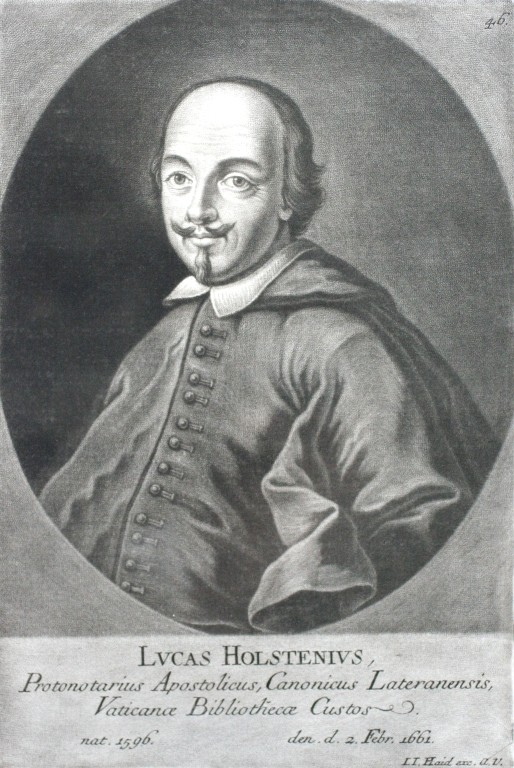
Lucas Holstenius.

Lucas Holstenius, born Lucas Holstein (1596 – 2 February 1661), was a German Catholic humanist, geographer, historian, and librarian.

== Life ==
Born at Hamburg in 1596, he studied at the gymnasium of Hamburg, and later at Leiden University, where he was closely acquainted with some of the most famous scholars of the age, including Johannes Meursius, Daniel Heinsius and Philip Cluverius, whom in 1618 he accompanied on his travels in Italy and Sicily, thus giving him a taste for the study of geography. Disappointed at his failure on his return to obtain a post in the gymnasium of his native Hamburg, he left Germany for good. Having spent two years from 1622 in England, at Oxford and London, gathering materials for his Geographi Minores, he then proceeded to Paris.

At Paris in 1624, he became librarian to the President de Mesmes, the friend of the scholarly brothers Dupuy, and the correspondent of N. Peiresc. At this time he was converted to Catholicism. He was probably led to take this step from reading the writings on mystical theology of the Greek and Latin Fathers. However, he showed his liberal-mindedness by strenuously opposing the strict censorship exercised by the Congregation of the Index.

In 1627 he went to Rome, and through the influence of Peiresc was admitted to the household of Cardinal Francesco Barberini, former papal nuncio and the possessor of the most important private library in Rome. In 1636 he became the cardinal's librarian. Much of Holstenius' collection was deposited in the Biblioteca Angelica in Rome.

Finally, under Innocent X, he was placed in charge of the Vatican Library. The popes sent him on various honorable missions, such as bearing the cardinal's hat to the nuncio at Warsaw in 1629, and Alexander VII sent him to Innsbruck to receive the formal abjuration of Protestantism from Christina, former Queen of Sweden. He also acted as intermediary in the conversion of the Danish nobleman, Friedrich, Landgrave of Hessen-Darmstadt and of Christoph, Graf von Rantzau.

Mostly, however, he was occupied with his studies. Holstenius formed great projects. He was a man of unwearied industry and immense learning, but he lacked the persistency to carry out the vast literary schemes he had planned. Among them, he desired to correct Philipp Clüver's errors and complete his work; to edit, translate and comment the works of the Neoplatonists; to form a collection of the unedited homilies of the Greek Fathers; to collect inscriptions; to write a critical commentary on the Greek text of the Bible; to form a collection of all the monuments and acts of the history of the popes. These diverse undertakings consumed his energies and filled his notebooks, but without profit to scholarship. His notes and collations have been used by various editors.

Holstenius died on 2 February 1661 in Rome.

== Works ==
The principal works that Holstenius actually published are notes on Cluvier's Italia antiqua (1624); an edition of portions of Porphyry (1630), with a dissertation on his life and writings; notes on Eusebius Against Hierocles (1628), on the Sayings of the later Pythagoreans (1638), and the De diis et mundo of the neo-Platonist Sallustius (1638); an edition of Arrian's treatise on the Chase (1644), and the Codex regularum monasticarum, a collection of monastic rules (1661). This last included in an appendix the first printing of the De admonitio ad filium spiritualem. He also rediscovered and edited for the first time the Liber Diurnus Romanorum Pontificum, a collection of ancient Roman chancery formulae used in the administration of the Roman Church (1660), but this edition, however, was immediately suppressed by Alexander VII.

Holstenius is also important as the first to locate Horace's fanum Vacunae (the shrine of Vacuna, mentioned in Epistles 1.10.49) as that of Victoria in Roccagiovine following the discovery there of an inscription commemorating Vespasian's restoration of the shrine of Victoria.

After his death there were published from his papers collections of synods and ecclesiastical monuments, the Collectio romana bipartita (1662), also the acts of the martyrs Perpetua and Felicitas; Boniface; Tarachus, Probus and Andronicus (1663); Notae et castigationes in Stephan Byzantini ethnica (1684).
