= Admonitio ad filium spiritualem =

Latin monastic writing from ca. 500 CE

Start of the Admonitio in a manuscript of the first quarter of the 11th century

Admonitio ad filium spiritualem (Admonition to a Spiritual Son) is an anonymous Latin "manual of spiritual edification" written around the year 500. During the Middle Ages, it was believed to be a translation by Rufinus of Aquileia of a Greek original by Basil of Caesarea. It is now thought to be an original Latin composition, most likely by Porcarius of Lérins. Its author is still known conventionally as Pseudo-Basil.

The Admonitio survives in many manuscripts. Paul Lehmann based his edition on eight from between the 8th and 16th centuries. A partial Old English translation survives in three manuscripts. The translation was probably made by Ælfric of Eynsham (c. 957–1010). Margaret Locherbie-Cameron counts 39 manuscripts of the Latin and Old English texts in Britain alone. Lucas Holstenius was the first to print the text when he included it in an appendix to his edition of Benedict of Aniane's Codex regularum in 1661.

The Admonitio consists of a prologue and twenty chapters. Its recommendations are ascetic in character. Gluttony and greed for money are condemned and vigils praised. One should recall one's eventual death at rising and going to bed. The analogy of spiritual warfare is prominent: "I desire to instruct you about the meaning of the spiritual army [militia spirituali] and how you should serve your king. . . while earthly soldiers serve an earthly king and obey all his orders, those who serve the heavenly king guard heavenly precepts. While earthly soldiers [militia terrena] battle against earthly enemies with earthly arms, you battle against a spiritual enemy with spiritual arms."

Pseudo-Basil's chief sources seem to have been the Vita sancti Antonii, the Latin version of the biography of Anthony the Great by Athanasius of Alexandria; Rufinus' translation of the Regula sancti Basilii; and the twenty-fifth epistle of Paulinus of Nola. The prologue of the Admonitio in turn influenced the prologue of Benedict of Nursia's Regula.

The Admonitio was well known in the Carolingian Empire and Anglo-Saxon England. Besides the translation of Ælfric, excerpts show up in the Old English Blickling and Vercelli homilies. The florilegium Liber scintillarum also includes some excerpts. Alcuin of York, an Anglo-Saxon scholar in Charlemagne's court, quotes the Latin text in his letters. Abbot Smaragdus of Saint-Mihiel quotes it in his commentary on Benedict's Regula. Patriarch Paulinus of Aquileia's Liber exhortationis, a mirror for princes written for Duke Eric of Friuli, is indebted to the Pseudo-Basilian description of spiritual warfare.

== Editions ==
=== Latin ===
- Lehmann, Paul, ed. Die admonitio s. Basilii ad filium spiritualem. Sitzungsberichte der Bayerischen Akademie der Wissenschaften, 7. Munich: C. H. Beck. 1955.

=== Old English ===
- Norman, H. W., ed. The Anglo-Saxon Version of the "Hexameron" and the Anglo-Saxon Remains of St Basil's "Admonitio ad Filium Spiritualem". London: Smith, 1848.
- Mueller, Lawrence Edwin, ed. Aelfric's Translation of St. Basil's Admonitio ad Filium Spiritualem: An Edition. PhD diss. University of Washington, 1974. ProQuest 7429468
- Locherbie-Cameron, Margaret Ann, ed. Ælfric's Old English Admonition to a Spiritual Son: An Edition. PhD diss. Bangor University, 1998. ProQuest 27609557

=== Translations ===
- Baguenard, Jean-Marie, trans. "L'admonition à un fils spirituel". In Dans la tradition Basilienne les constitutions ascétiques: L'admonition à un fils spirituel et autres écrits. Spiritualité Orientales, 58. Bégrolles-en-Mauges: Abbaye de Bellefontaine, 1994.
- LePree, James Francis, trans. "Pseudo-Basil's De admonitio ad filium spiritualem: A New English Translation". The Heroic Age: A Journal of Early Medieval Northwestern Europe 13 (2010).
