= De videndo Deo =

Letter by Augustine

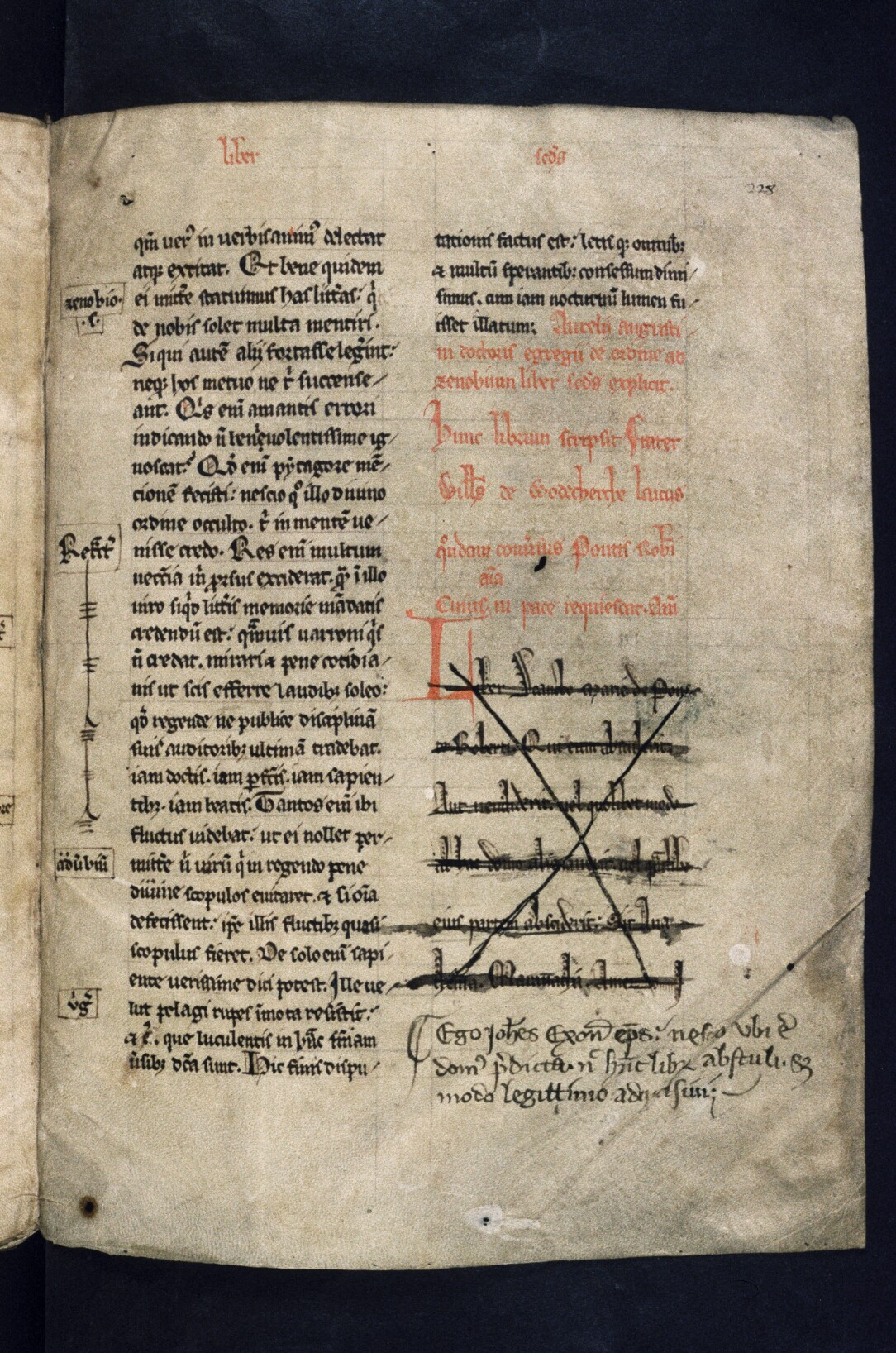
Manuscript of Augustine's letter from the 13th century

De videndo Deo (lit. 'On Seeing God') is an epistle written by Augustine of Hippo regarding whether God can be physically perceived. It is designated epistle 147 in the Augustinus-Lexikon. The letter is addressed to Paulina, the wife of Armentarius, and it has 54 chapters. It is estimated to have been written between 412 and 413 AD.

Augustine claims that testimony, including divine revelation, can lead to knowledge, specifically scientia.

Thomas Aquinas refers to De videndo Deo in Summa Theologica.

== See also ==
- Beatific vision
- Darshan (Indian religions)
- Epistemology
- Philosophy of testimony
- On the Trinity
