= Jérôme Bignon =

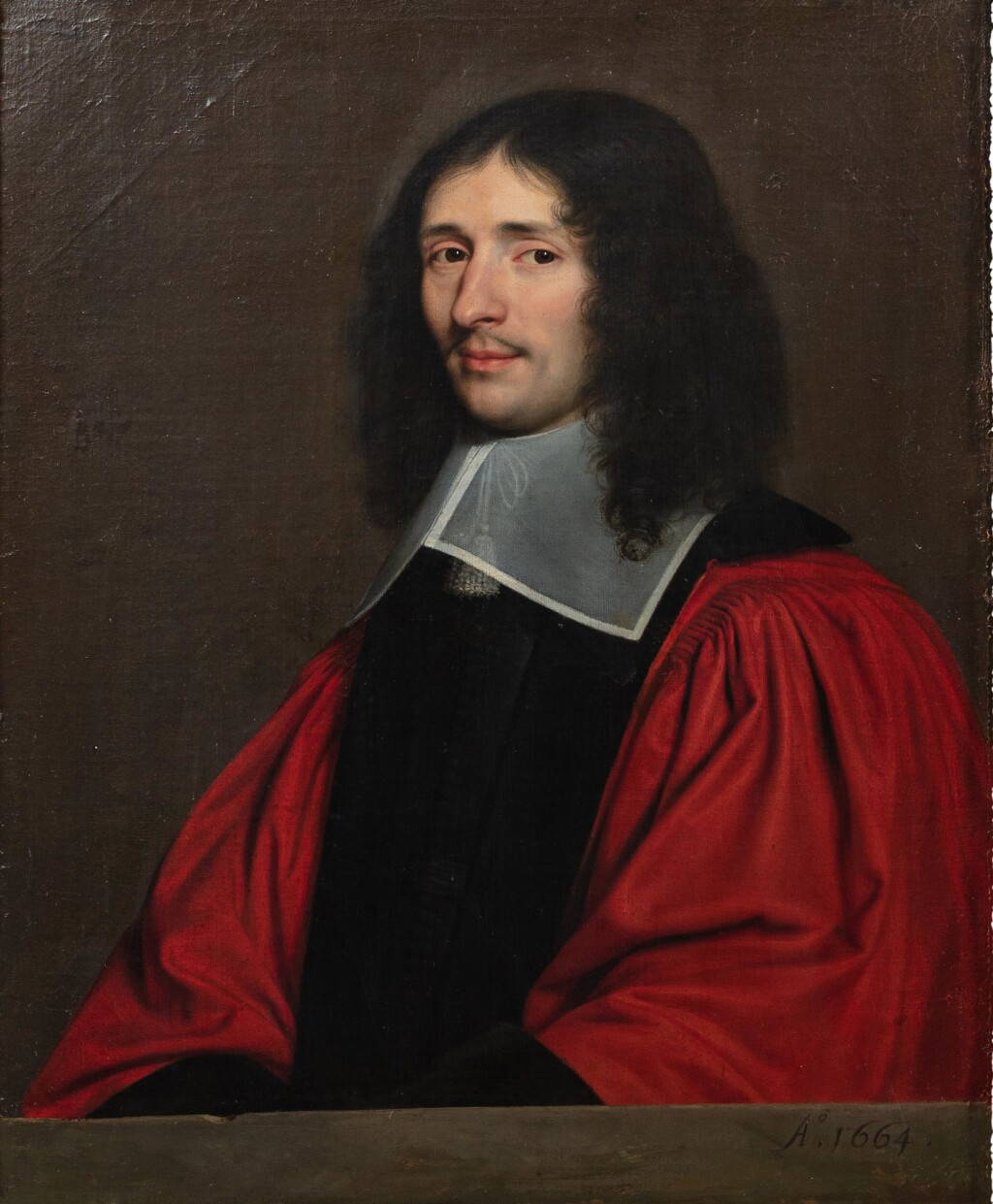
Jérôme Bignon.

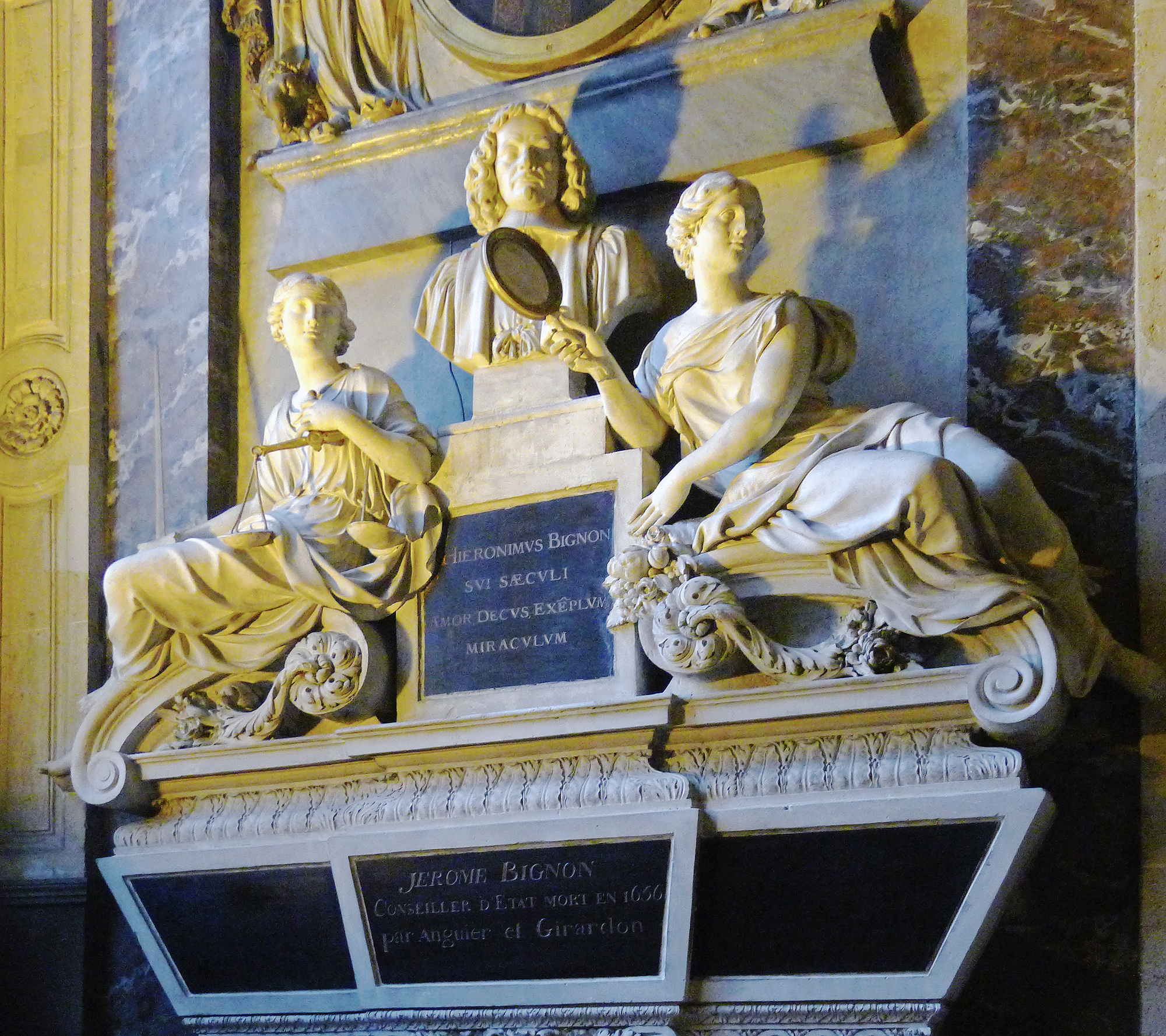
Church of Saint-Nicolas-du-Chardonnet (tomb of Jérome Bignon) - Paris V.

Jérôme Bignon (French pronunciation: [ʒeʁom biɲɔ̃]; 1589–1656) was a French lawyer born in Paris.

== Life ==
His family originated from the western part of France, and came to Paris at the beginning of the sixteenth century. He was uncommonly precocious, and under his father's tuition had acquired an immense mass of knowledge before he was ten years of age. A work by him entitled Choréographie, ou description de la Terre Sainte was published in 1600. The great reputation gained by this book served to introduce the author to Henri IV, who placed him for some time as a companion to the duc de Vendôme, and made him tutor to the dauphin, afterwards Louis XIII.

In 1604 he wrote his Discours de la ville de Rome, and in the following year his Traité sommaire de l'élection du pape. He then devoted himself to the study of law, and wrote in 1610 a treatise on the precedency of the kings of France, which gave great satisfaction to Henri IV. In 1613, Bignon edited, with learned notes, the Formulae of Marculf.

In 1620, he was made advocate-general to the grand council, and shortly afterwards a councillor of state, and in 1626 he became advocate-general to the parlement of Paris. In 1641 he resigned his official dignity, and in 1642 was appointed by Cardinal Richelieu to the charge of the royal library.

His grandson was intendant of the King (governor) in northern France at the end of the seventeenth century and a descendant, a solicitor also called Jérôme Bignon, is an M.P., elected in the same département of Somme in 2007.
