= Julian of Eclanum =

Early 5th century theologian

Julian of Eclanum (Latin: Iulianus Aeclanensis; Italian: Giuliano di Eclano; c. 386 – c. 455) was bishop of Eclanum, near today's Benevento (Italy). He was a distinguished leader of the Pelagians of the 5th century.

== Life ==
Julian was born in Apulia. His father was an Italian bishop named Memor or Memorius and his mother a noblewoman named Juliana. Augustine of Hippo was intimate with the family, and wrote of them in terms of great affection and respect. Around 404 Julian became a lector in the church over which his father presided, and while holding that office married a layperson named Titia.

Paulinus, afterwards bishop of Nola, composed an elaborate Epithalamium, which represents him as on terms of great intimacy with the family. By c. 410 Julian had become a deacon. He was consecrated to the episcopate by Innocent I c. 417, but the name of his see is variously given. Marius Mercator, who was his contemporary, distinctly speaks of him as "Episcopus Eclanensis". Innocent I died on 12 March 417. Up to that date Julian had maintained a high reputation for ability, learning, and orthodoxy, and Mercator concludes that he must have sympathized with Innocent's condemnation of the Pelagians. Yet there is reason to believe that even Innocent had ground for at least suspecting his connection with Pelagianism.

=== Connections with Pelagianism ===
When the cases of Pelagius and Coelestius were reopened by Zosimus, shortly after the death of Innocent, Julian seems to have expressed himself strongly in their favour in the hearing of Mercator; and when Zosimus issued his Epistola Tractoria 577 against the Pelagians (417 CE) and sent it to the major sees of the East and West for subscription, with the notable exception of Antioch, Julian was among those who refused. He was accordingly deposed, and afterwards exiled under the edicts issued by the emperor Honorius in March 418. Julian now addressed two letters to Zosimus, one of which was very generally circulated throughout Italy before it reached the pontiff. Of this Mercator has preserved some fragments. Of the other we have no remains.

About the same time Julian addressed a letter to Rufus, bishop of Thessalonica (410–431), on his own behalf and that of 18 fellow-recusants. Rufus was vicarius of the Roman see in Illyricum and just then in serious collision with Atticus the patriarch of Constantinople. As Atticus was a strenuous opponent of the Pelagians, Julian and his brethren perhaps thought Rufus might be persuaded to favour them. Zosimus died on 26 December 418 and was succeeded by Boniface I on 10 April 419. The letter of Julian to Rufus, with another to the clergy of Rome which he denied to be his, were answered by Augustine in his Contra Duas Epistolas Pelagianorum. Julian avows an earnest desire to gain the aid of the Oriental bishops against the "profanity of Manicheans," for so he styles the Catholics; accuses Zosimus of tergiversation and the Roman clergy of having been unduly influenced in their condemnation of the Pelagians; charges both with various heresies; and protests that by their means the subscriptions of nearly all the Western bishops had been uncanonically extorted to a dogma which he characterizes as "non minus stultum quam impium". Garnier assigns the letter to Rufus and the two to Zosimus to 418.

When Julian addressed his two letters to Zosimus he was preparing a reply to the first of Augustine's two books De Nuptiis et Concupiscentia, which he addressed to a fellow-recusant named Turbantius, whose prayers he earnestly asks that the church may be delivered from the defilement of Manicheism. He sent some extracts from the work, which was in four books, and apparently entitled Contra eos qui nuptias damnant et fructus earum diabolo assignant, to Valerius, who forwarded them to his friend Augustine, who at once rejoined in a second book De Nuptiis et Concupiscentia. When Julian's work subsequently came into his hands, Augustine published a fuller rejoinder in his Contra Julianum Pelagianum. Augustine freely quotes his antagonist, and Julian again insisted upon the Manicheism of his opponents; again charged Zosimus with prevarication, and elaborated the whole anthropology for which he contended.

When driven from the West, Julian and some of his fellow-exiles went into Cilicia and remained for a time with Theodorus, bishop of Mopsuestia, who is charged by Mercator with having been one of the originators of Pelagianism and who wrote against Augustine. Meanwhile, the rejoinder of Augustine had reached Julian, who answered it in 8 books, addressed to Florus, a fellow-recusant. Mercator has given various extracts, but it is best known from Augustine's elaborate Opus Imperfectum, which was evoked by it, but left incomplete. On the death of Boniface I and the succession of Celestine I in September 422, Julian apparently left Cilicia and returned to Italy, probably hoping that the new pontiff might reconsider the case of the Pelagians, especially as a variance had then arisen between the Roman see and the African bishops. Celestine repulsed him, and caused him to be exiled a second time. Julian was also condemned, in his absence, by a council in Cilicia, Theodorus concurring in the censure. On this Julian went to Constantinople, where the same fate awaited him both from Atticus and his successor Sisinnius (426, 427). On the accession of Nestorius to the patriarchate in 428, the expectations of Julian were again raised, and he appealed both to Nestorius and to the emperor Theodosius II. Both at first gave him some encouragement, which may be why there is no mention of the Pelagians in the celebrated edict which the emperor issued against heresies at the instance of Nestorius. The patriarch wrote to Celestine more than once on his behalf and that of his friends, but the favour he shewed them necessitated his defending himself in a public discourse delivered in their presence, and translated by Mercator. In 429 Mercator presented his Commonitorium de Coelestio to the emperor, wherein he carefully relates the proceedings against the Pelagians and comments severely upon their teaching. Julian and his friends were then driven from Constantinople by an imperial edict.

Towards the close of 430 Celestine convened a council at Rome, which condemned Julian and others once more.

=== Last years ===
Whither he went from Constantinople does not appear, but he with other Pelagians, seems to have accompanied Nestorius to the convent of Ephesus and took part in the Conciliabulum held by John of Antioch. Baronius infers from one of the letters of Gregory the Great that the "Conciliabulum" absolved Julian and his friends, but Cardinal Noris has shown that the council repeat their condemnation of the Pelagians, expressly mentioning Julian by name.

Sixtus III, the successor of Celestine (31 July 432) when a presbyter, had favoured the Pelagians, much to the grief of Augustine. Julian attempted to recover his lost position through him, but Sixtus evidently treated him with severity, mainly at the instigation of Leo, then a presbyter, who became his successor, 440. When pontiff himself, Leo showed the same spirit toward the Pelagians, especially toward Julian. We hear no more of Julian until his death in Sicily, c. 454. Some years after his death Julian was again condemned by Joannes Talaia, bishop of Nola around 484.

Julian was an able and a learned man. Gennadius speaks of him as "vir acer ingenio, in divinis Scripturis doctus, Graeca et Latina lingua scholasticus". Besides his works already mentioned, Bede speaks of his Opuscula on the Canticles, and among them of a "libellus" de Amore, and a "libellus" de Bono Constantiae, both of which he charges with Pelagianism, giving from each some extracts. Garnier claims Julian as the translator of the Libellus Fidei a Rufino Palaestinae Provinciae Presbytero, which he has published in his edition of Marius Mercator, and as the author of the liber Definitionum seu Ratiocinationem, to which Augustine replied in his De Perfectione Justitiae.

== Julian's theology ==
A sympathetic and accessible account of Julian's Pelagian theology can be found in chapter 32 of Peter Brown's Augustine of Hippo: A Biography (1967, 2000). From the year 419 on, Julian and St. Augustine waged a well-matched war of books, pamphlets, letters, and sermons from which we gain a clear idea of their contrasting views. Their debate is still alive today:

Sin and will: Some Pelagians denied that the original sin of Adam was transmitted to all humans at birth. Babies, therefore, need not be baptized: they are born innocent. Adult baptism does remit sins, but for the Pelagian, this meant that the baptized Christian, after this dramatic fresh start, was now free to perfect himself alone, with or without the aid of the Church. It is worth noting that in the surviving fragments of Pelagius' writings, Pelagius writes that infants must be baptized and that there is no goodness without grace. Julian himself wrote a letter to Rome in which he said "We confess that the grace of Christ is necessary to all, both to grown-up people and to infants; and we anathematize those who say that a child born of two baptized people ought not to be baptized." He also affirmed that grace was necessary for all: "We maintain that men are the work of God, and that no one is forced unwillingly by His power either into evil or good, but that man does either good or ill of his own will; but that in a good work he is always assisted by God’s grace, while in evil he is incited by the suggestions of the devil." This is in contrast to Augustinian views of original sin. Pelagians viewed sin as a matter of will and not of nature, as a choice that can be reversed. Strengthened by baptism, everyone possesses enough self-control to reject evil. (In this, Pelagians drew on pagan Stoicism.) For Augustine, such optimism was dangerously naive: human will is caught in a dark internal labyrinth of untamable compulsions. No one is strong enough to save himself without God's grace and the sacraments of the Church.

The equity of God: Julian drew on the Jewish equation of divinity and law. For him, our concept of law as something rational, sensible, and proportionate is divine in origin, and mirrors the attributes of God himself. An unjust God is inconceivable as God. For Pelagians, God would not condemn every human because of one sin committed by Adam; God would not condemn to infinite torment those whose sins were finite or who had simply never heard of Christ (again, Pelagius appears to have felt differently in some of his fragments, as he claimed baptism was required for salvation for anyone). Augustine dismissed such notions of justice as too fallible to be attributed to God, whose ways are inscrutable. Pelagians rejected predestination as incompatible with the freedom of each person to effect his own salvation. Julian charged that Augustine was still Manichean, if only in temperament. A charge argued against by Augustine in Against Julian.

Sexuality: As Brown puts it, "Julian spoke boldly of the sexual instinct as a sixth sense of the body, as a [morally] neutral energy that might be used well...delicately poised between reason and animal feeling." (1), . Julian said "We say that the sexual impulse—that is, that the virility itself, without which there can be no intercourse—is ordained by God.".

Social reform: Julian's Pelagianism presented itself as a purifying reform movement that sought to inspire morally perfected Christians to remake Roman society from the inside out, countering its brutality and injustice.
