= Caelestius =

Roman theologian and orator

Caelestius (or Celestius) was the major follower of the Christian teacher Pelagius and Pelagianism, which was opposed to Augustine of Hippo and his doctrine on original sin, and was later declared to be heresy by mainstream Nicene Christianity.

== Development of Caelestius' doctrines ==
It is believed Caelestius met Pelagius in the late 4th century in the city of Rome. Pelagius emphasized that Christians were required by God to struggle against evil behavior using the teachings of the Bible and the example of the Christian saints (although he also affirmed repeatedly in Church proceedings and in a letter to the pope that grace assisted the will in all good actions).

For several decades before the doctrine of sin was fully worked out by the church, this teaching brought both of them into numerous theological disputes about the nature of sin with several leaders in the Christian church. Among them were the Bishop of the northern African Roman province of Hippo, Augustine (later known as Saint Augustine) and the theologian Jerome. Augustine especially did more than any other Father of the Church to develop the doctrine of original sin, mostly in reaction to his disputes with Pelagius and Caelestius, which remain in Augustine's numerous writings.

It should be mentioned when assessing the alleged teachings and sayings of Caelestius and Pelagius that the works of neither exist today, although fragments of what is believed to be their writings are quoted in the works of Augustine and Jerome.

Caelestius also went much further than Pelagius in stating that the sin of Adam, as chronicled in the Biblical Book of Genesis, had only harmed himself, and not all of humanity, as Augustine had taught in his writings and sermons. (Pelagius has been accused of starting this teaching, but in fact he anathematized the opinions of Caelestius at the Synod of Lydda in 415, as well as in a letter to the pope shortly afterwards.) In several books on the topic, Augustine also argued that Pelagius and Caelestius neglected to take God's divine grace into account. Augustine believed Adam's sin ("Fall") in the Garden of Eden had caused human beings to lose the ability to not sin ("non posse non peccare" in Latin) and therefore, all good deeds done by Christians come from them being enabled by God to do good. In contrast, Pelagius believed that God gave the power of free will to all men, not just Christians, in such a way that no one was forced into sin (Augustine even wrote certain remarks that seemed to imply that any such forced action would not in fact be sinful). Caelestius again appears to have gone beyond this and denied that Christian goodness is due to grace, on the grounds that this would imply that if any Christian sinned, it was because God's grace had failed; once again at the Synod of Lydda Pelagius anathematized this position (although he stated that he did not mean to indicate whether they were Caelestius' opinions or not).

== Persecution ==
After they left Rome when it was attacked and burned by the Visigoths in 410, Pelagius and Caelestius faced constant attacks against their teachings by Augustine, Jerome and their followers, who sought to have the Pope declare their views "heretical," or contrary to Christian teachings.

In 411 AD, the same year they arrived in North Africa, Caelestius faced a council in Carthage to defend his views. His accuser, the deacon Paulinus of Milan, listed six of Caelestius' ideas to be counted as heresies, but it is worth noting there is no recorded confirmation that Caelestius identified his views in the same way:

1. Even if Adam had not sinned, he would have died.
2. Adam's sin did not harm the entire human race.
3. Children are born into the same state Adam was born into.
4. The whole human race neither dies through Adam's sin nor is saved through Christ's resurrection.
5. The law gives entrance to heaven as well as the gospel.
6. Before Jesus some men lived without sin.

== Council of Carthage ==
Caelestius refused to retract his views and when the above six points were condemned, the synod denied him ordination. He first intended to object and appeal to the Pope but instead left for Ephesus and was ordained there. Throughout their career, both Pelagius and Caelestius found a more welcome reception in the Eastern Roman Empire for their teachings than in the west. This same view is also shared by the German Protestant theologian Hans von Campenhausen in his book "The Fathers of the Church" when discussing the relationship of Pelagianism with the orthodox champion Saint Augustine.

Later, it is recorded that Pelagius claimed in a synod that he did not agree with all of Caelestius' teachings. In Carthage, two local synods formed and condemned Pelagius and Caelestius without their presence. After being banished from Constantinople and condemned by Pope Innocent, Caelestius brought his case to Pope Zosimus, who was initially impressed by Caelestius' confessions of faith. However, after a new synodal letter of the African council of May 1, 418 to the pope and steps were taken by Emperor Honorius against the Pelagians, Zosimus was convinced both Caelestius and Pelagius were heretics. Zosimus issued his Tractoria in which Pelagianism and its authors were finally condemned. No further information is known about Caelestius afterward.

Caelestius was again condemned at the First Council of Ephesus in 431.

The teachings of Pelagius and Caelestius were taken up by the Bishop Julian of Eclanum (ca. 386 - 454.)

== Writings By Caelestius ==
- Unnamed Books by Caelestius
- Written Statement Of Belief by Caelestius
- The Definitions, So It Is Said, Of Coelestius Possibly by Caelestius

== See also ==
- Pelagius
- Pelagianism
- Semipelagianism

== Related links and Sources ==
- Transcripts From The Council of Carthage Held Against Coelestius in 411 or 412 AD
- Canons From The Council Of Carthage Against Pelagianism, May 1, 418
- Marius Mercator’s A Memorandum Concerning Coelestius
- See On the Merits and Remission of Sins by St. Augustine
- Anonymous. Original Sin. In The Catholic Encyclopedia, Volume XI. Online edition accessed January 10, 2006.
- Anonymous. Pelagianism. In The Catholic Encyclopedia, Volume XI. Online edition accessed January 10, 2006.
