= Henry Noris =

Italian church historian, theologian and Cardinal

His Eminence Henry Noris
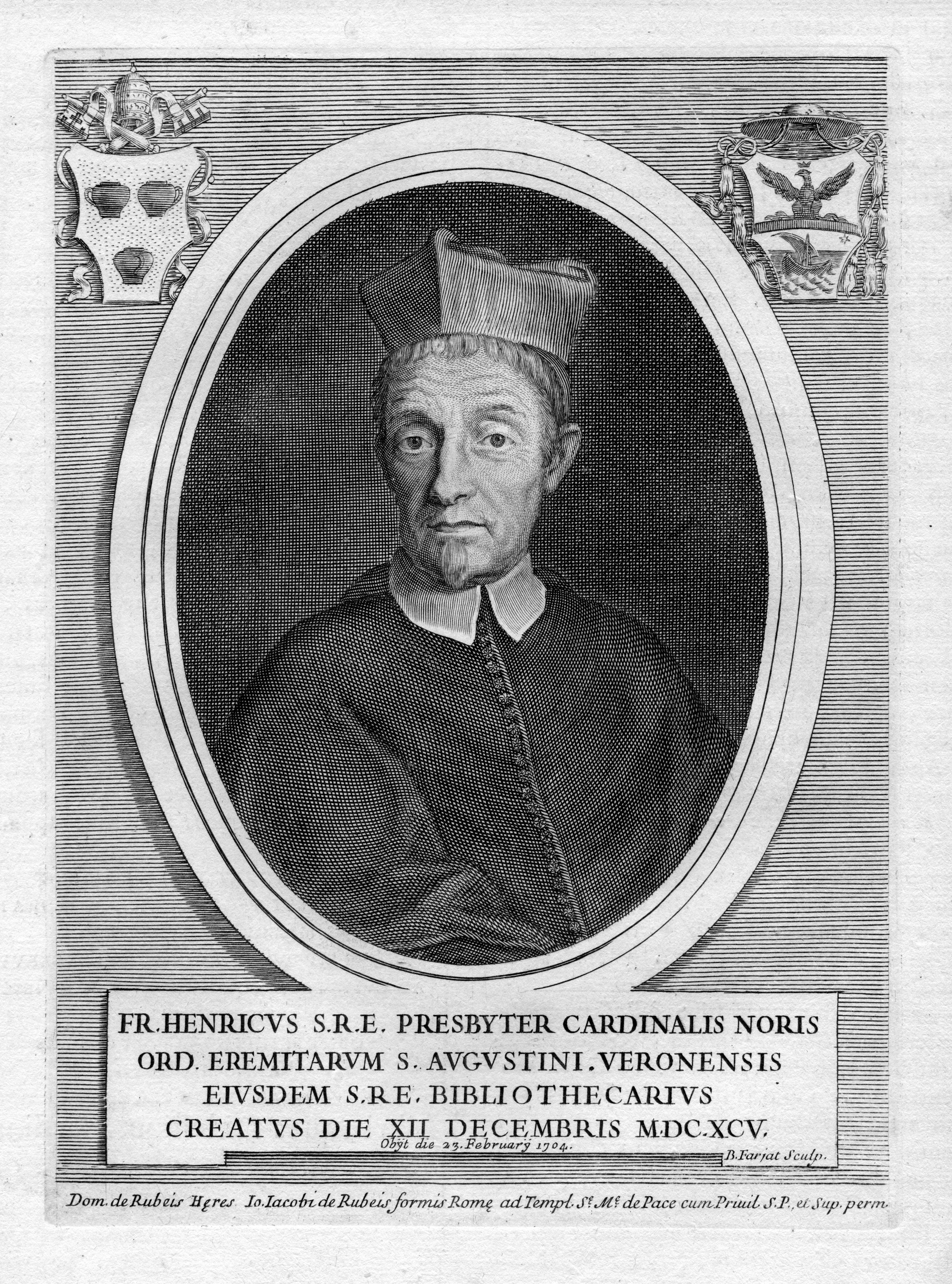
- Engraved eighteenth century portrait of Enrico Noris (1695-1704)

Orders
- Created cardinal: 12 December 1695 by Pope Innocent XII

Personal details
- Born: 29 August 1631 Verona, Republic of Venice
- Died: 23 February 1704 (aged 72) Rome, Papal States
- Buried: Verona Cathedral
- Denomination: Roman Catholic

Henry Noris OSA (Italian: Enrico Noris; 29 August 1631 – 23 February 1704) was an Italian Church historian, theologian and cardinal.

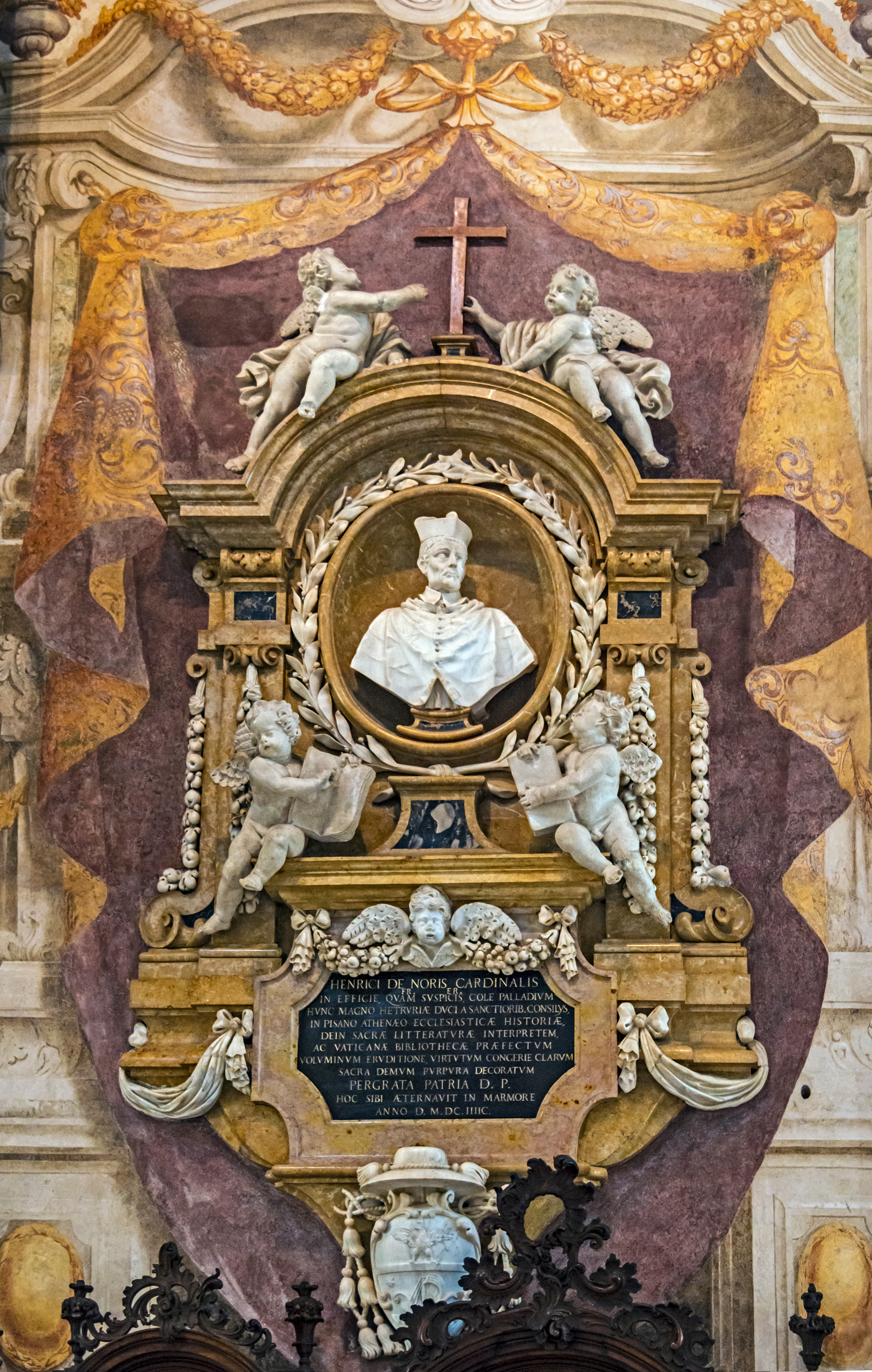
Funeral monument in the Verona Cathedral

== Biography ==
Noris was born at Verona, and was baptized with the name Hieronymus (Girolamo). His ancestors were Irish. His father, Alessandro, had written a work on the German wars. At the age of fifteen, he was sent to study under the Jesuits at Rimini, and there entered the novitiate of the Hermits of Saint Augustine, where he took the name "Enrico". He caught the attention of his order's Father Assistant of Italy, Celestino Bruni, who recommended him to the attention of the Father General, Fulgenzio Petrelli (1645–1648).

After his probation, Noris was sent to Rome to study theology. He lived in his Order's house at Sant'Agostino, in the company of a number of scholars in secular and ecclesiastical history, including Christian Lupus. He taught theology at his order's houses in Pesaro, Perugia, and Padua.

There he completed The History of Pelagianism and Dissertations on the Fifth General Council, the two works which, before and after his death, occasioned much controversy. Together with the Vindiciae Augustinianae, they were printed at Padua in 1673, having been approved by a special commission at Rome. Noris himself went to Rome to give an account of his orthodoxy before this commission, where he came to the (favorable) attention of the Assessor at the Holy Office, Girolamo Casanate.

Pope Clement X named him one of the qualificators of the Holy Office, in recognition of his learning and sound doctrine. In 1674, Noris was appointed court theologian to Grand Duke Cosimo III of Tuscany, on the recommendation of Antonio Magliabecci, the Ducal Librarian. It was Cosimo III who appointed him lecturer in church history at the University of Pisa.

But, after the publication of these works, further charges were made against Noris of teaching the heresies of Jansenius and Baius. In a brief to the prefect of the Spanish Inquisition, 31 July 1748, ordering the name of Noris to be taken off the list of forbidden books, Pope Benedict XIV says that these charges were never proved; that they were rejected repeatedly by the Holy Office, and repudiated by the popes who had honoured him.

In 1675, he was admitted to Queen Christina of Sweden's salon in Rome. A fellow member was Cardinal Vincenzo Maria Orsini, the future Pope Benedict XIII. After her death in 1689, a formal Academy was founded in Rome, the Arcadian Academy, and Noris was a member.

It is said that Noris was offered the bishopric of Pistoia, which he refused. This would have been in 1678, when the incumbent died.

In 1692, Noris was made assistant librarian in the Vatican by Pope Innocent XII. The librarian at the time was Cardinal Girolamo Casanata, the same person who had supported Noris when he was brought before the Inquisition. On 12 December 1695, Noris was named Cardinal-Priest of the Title of Sant'Agostino. In 1700, on the death of Cardinal Casanate, he was given full charge of the Vatican Library.

Noris participated in the 1700 Conclave after the death of Pope Innocent XII (Pignatelli), which elected Pope Clement XI (Albani)on 23 November.

He died in Rome on 23 February 1704, at the age of 72, and was buried in his titular church of Sant'Agostino.

== Works ==
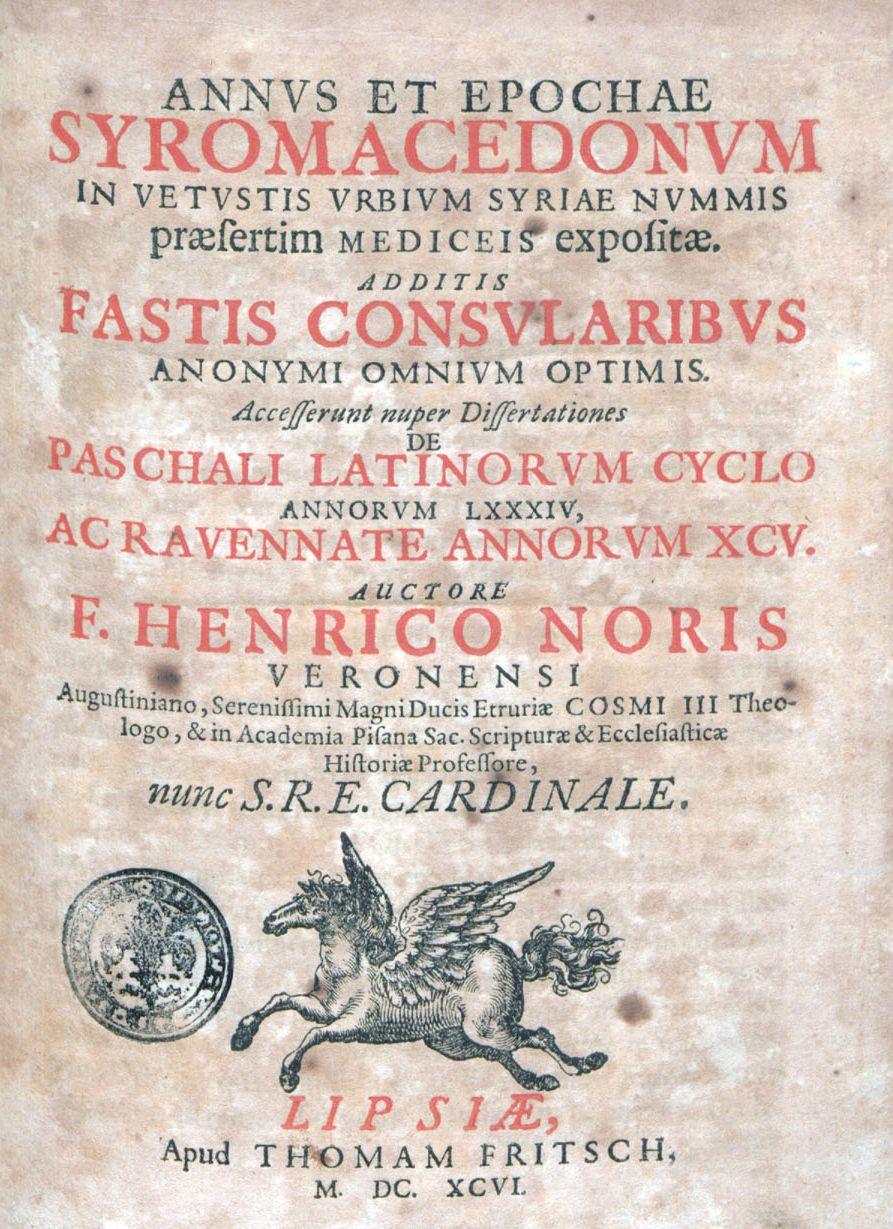
Annus et epochae Syromacedonum, 1696

Noris's works, apart from some minor controversial treatises, are highly valued for accuracy and thoroughness of research. In addition to those already named, the most important are:

- Annus et epochae Syromacedonum (in Latin). Leipzig: Thomas Fritsch. 1696.
- "Fasti Consulares Anonimi e Manuscripto Bibliothecae Caesareae Deprompti"
- "Historia Controversiae de Uno ex Trinitate Passo"
- "Apologia Monachorum Scythiae"
- "Historia Donatistarum e Schedis Norisianis Excerptae"
- "Storia delle Investiture delle Dignita Ecclesiastiche".

Select portions of his works have been frequently reprinted: at Padua, 1673–1678, 1708; at Louvain, 1702; at Bassano, edited by Giovanni Lorenzo Berti, 1769. The best is the edition of all the works, in five folio volumes, by the Ballerini brothers, Verona, 1729–1741.
