= On Nature and Grace =

On Nature and Grace (Latin: De natura et gratia) is an anti-Pelagian book by Augustine of Hippo written in AD 415. It is a response to Pelagius's 414 book On Nature (Latin: De natura). Before this work, Augustine did not seem to see Pelagius as a heretic, but On Nature and Grace seems to be a turning point in the Pelagian controversy. The work does not mention Pelagius by name, but by responding to De natura, Augustine for the first time engages Pelagius as an opponent.

== Sources ==
- Collinge, William J. (2010) [1992]. "Introduction". Four Anti-Pelagian Writings. The Fathers of the Church. Vol. 86. Washington D.C.: CUA Press. ISBN 9780813211862.
