= Antonio Maria Ceriani =

- Born: May 2, 1828; Uboldo, Italy
- Died: March 2, 1907 (aged 78); Milan
- Church: Catholic Archdiocese of Milan
- Ordained: 1852
- Offices held: Prefect of Ambrosian Library
- Title: Monsignor

Antonio Maria Ceriani (May 2, 1828 – March 2, 1907) was an Italian prelate, Syriacist, and scholar.

Ceriani was born at Uboldo, in Lombardy. He was ordained a priest for his home diocese of Milan in 1852 and the same year was appointed keeper of the catalogue of the Biblioteca Ambrosiana (Ambrosian Library) at Milan. From 1857 he was one of the Doctors of the Ambrosiana of which in January 1870 he became Prefect, a post he kept until his death. Among his additional charges, from 1855 he was professor of oriental languages in the diocesan Major Seminary and from 1872 professor of paleography. From the 1880s he was in scholarly contact with the English medical doctor turned liturgical scholar, John Wickham Legg.

Ceriani discovered the pseudepigraphal apocrypha entitled the Assumption of Moses (or the Testament of Moses in modern editions)—a Jewish work that survived in one poorly preserved sixth-century Latin palimpsest in the Ambrosian Library. He published the work in 1861. The edition presented by The Online Critical Pseudepigrapha is "identical to Ceriani's excellent transcription of the manuscript.". He also discovered and published in 1866 another apocryphal text, the Syriac Apocalypse of Baruch and also a Syriac translation of the fifth column of the Septuagint as preserved in Origen's Hexapla—a photographic edition in 7 volumes, Monumenta sacra et profana, Codex syrohexaplaris Ambrosianus, Milan 1861–1874.

Ceriani died at Milan in 1907, leaving as his principal scholarly heir Achille Ratti, later to become Pope Pius XI.

A cause for Ceriani's beatification was formally opened on November 12, 1946, and he was given the title Servant of God.
