= Formulary of Marculf =

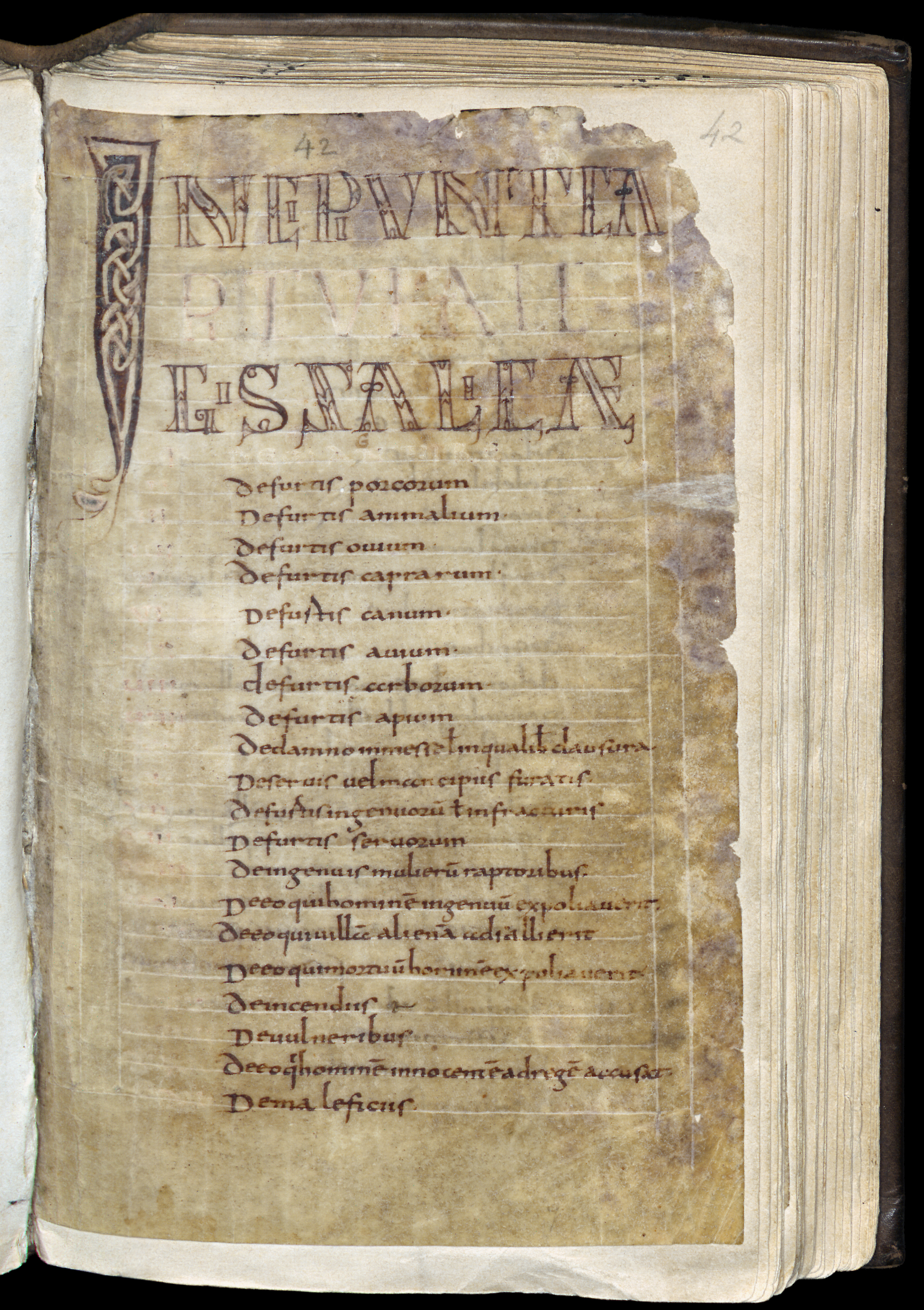
Opening of the Formulary in the 9th-century manuscript Cod. Lugdun., Voss Lat. O 86

The Formulary of Marculf is the longest and best preserved formulary (collection of model documents) from the Merovingian kingdoms. Written in Latin, it contains 92 models divided between two books, the first dealing with royal and the second with private charters. It was compiled in the second half of the seventh century by a monk named Marculf, then over seventy years of age, for a bishop named Landeric. Owing to its fine organization, possession of a preface and good manuscript transmission, it has often been treated as a literary work, quite unlike other formularies.

== Bibliography ==
- Faulkner, Thomas (2018). "Marculf, Formulary of". In Nicholson, Oliver (ed.). The Oxford Dictionary of Late Antiquity, Volume 2: J–Z. Oxford: Oxford University Press. p. 962. ISBN 978-0-19-881625-6.
- Rio, Alice, ed. (2008). The Formularies of Angers and Marculf: Two Merovingian Legal Handbooks. Liverpool: Liverpool University Press. ISBN 978-1-84631-159-8.
