= On the Trinity =

Book written by Augustine of Hippo

On the Trinity (Latin: De Trinitate) is a book written in Latin by Augustine of Hippo which discussed the Christian doctrine of Trinity in context of the Logos. Although not as well known as some of his other works, some scholars have seen it as his masterpiece, of more doctrinal importance even than Confessions or The City of God.

It is also the title of works written by at least two other scholars of the early church: Hilary of Poitiers (the "Hammer of the Arians") and Richard of St. Victor.

== Development ==
De Trinitate is placed by Augustine in his Retractationes, among the works written (meaning begun) in AD 400. In letters of 410 and 414 and at the end of 415, it is referred to as still unfinished and unpublished, but a letter of 412 states that friends were at that time asking to complete and publish it, and the letter to Aurelius, which was sent with the treatise itself when actually completed, states that a portion of it, while still unrevised and incomplete, was in fact surreptitiously made public. It was still in hand in 416: in Book XIII, a quotation occurs from the 12th Book of the De Civitate Dei; and another quotation in Book XV, from the 99th Tractate on John's Gospel.

The Retractationes, which refer to it, are usually dated not later than 428. The letter to Bishop Aurelius also states that the work was many years in progress and was begun in Saint Augustine's early manhood. It was finished in his old age. Arthur West Haddan inferred from this evidence that it was written between 400, when he was forty-six years old and had been Bishop of Hippo about four years, and 428 at the latest; but it probably had been published ten or twelve years earlier, in or around 417.

== Belief and ratio ==
In an apocryphal letter of Augustine to Cyril of Jerusalem, Augustine referred to having seen a child who was trying to pour the seawater in a hole with a seashell. After having explained to the child that it was impossible, the child replied in Latin to Augustine: "Augustinus, Augustinus, quid quaeris? Putasne brevi immettere vasculo mare totum?" (which means: "Augustine, Augustine, what are you trying to do? Do you believe to be able to pour the whole sea in a little jar?"). Then the child disappeared from his sight.

The anecdote means the impossibility for the finite human mind to know deeply the faith mystery of the Holy Trinity. The anecdote became a popular iconographic subject. Some interpreters identify the child with the Lord Jesus.
