= Éditions du Cerf =

French publishing house

- Founded: 1929
- Founder: Marie-Vincent Bernadot
- Country of origin: France
- Headquarters location: Paris, France
- Revenue: €6,510,700
- Owner: Dominican Order
- No. of employees: 20
- Official website: www.editionsducerf.fr

Éditions du Cerf (lit. 'Editions of the Hart') is a French publishing house founded in 1929 by the Dominican friar Marie-Vincent Bernadot and managed by the Order of Preachers, which still owns it. It specializes in religious, exegetical, historical, and philosophical works.

Under the leadership of Jean-François Colosimo since 2013, the publisher has broadened its list toward more media-visible essays and texts.

== History ==
=== 20th century ===
Éditions du Cerf was founded in 1929 at the request of Pius XI by the Dominican Marie-Vincent Bernadot (1883–1941), whose thinking was close to that of the pontiff. The name "Cerf" refers to the opening of Psalm 42:

Comme un cerf altéré cherche l'eau vive,
ainsi mon âme te cherche toi, mon Dieu.

— Traduction officielle liturgique de la Bible
Translation:

As a hart longs for flowing streams,
so longs my soul for thee, O God.

— RSVCE

In 1919 Father Bernadot had already founded the journal La Vie spirituelle to return Christian spirituality to its sources: Scripture, the Church Fathers, and the great mystics. In 1928—supported by Pope Pius XI, who instructed the Master of the Order to transfer him to Paris—Bernadot founded La Vie intellectuelle with Father Étienne Lajeunie and other intellectuals such as Jacques Maritain. The aim was to provide an alternative to the influence of Charles Maurras and his movement Action Française, condemned by Rome in 1926, and of which he was "convinced of the intrinsically perverse character."

A year after the launch of the journal—which marked a departure within the Order from the highly scholastic Thomism of theologian Réginald Garrigou-Lagrange—and with capital provided by friends, Bernadot founded the joint-stock company Les Éditions du Cerf on October 11, 1929. It shared the ambition to "counter the influence of Action française".

The company set up with a small group of Dominicans in a house in Juvisy-sur-Orge.

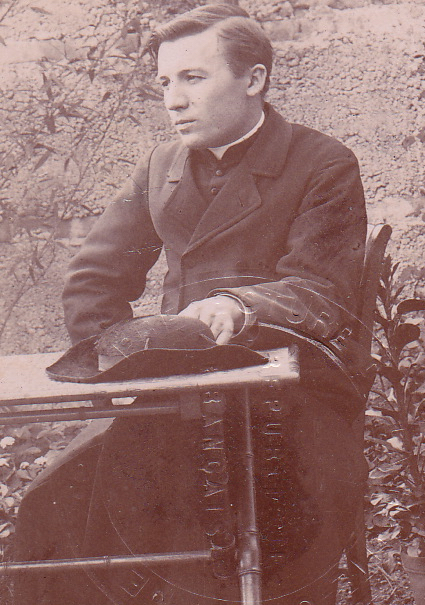
Marie-Vincent Bernadot, c. 1916.

From 1934 the publisher brought out Sept, a weekly whose editorial line was close to that of La Vie intellectuelle but aimed at a broader audience. Sept was published in Paris but written in Juvisy. To remedy this, Father Bernadot acquired a building at No. 29 Boulevard de la Tour-Maubourg in the 7th arrondissement of Paris, which soon housed a Dominican convent as well as the publishing house. He installed the paper's headquarters there and moved the team at the turn of 1936–1937.

Éditions du Cerf was then above all a "house of journals," which sometimes published books but for a long time was known mainly for the "Unam Sanctam" series, developed from 1937 by the Dominican theologian Yves Congar. The catalogue consisted largely of periodicals; in twenty years Bernadot developed no fewer than eight: to the existing titles were added the supplement to La Vie spirituelle, the Documents de La Vie intellectuelle, and Chrétienté, among others.

Positions taken in Cerf publications—often seen as nonconformist by Catholic opinion largely marked on the right—attracted increasing criticism. Sept was forced by the Holy Office to cease publication in August 1937. In 1939, when the newly elected Pius XII suspended the sanctions against L’Action française, Bernadot felt disavowed and resigned as publisher and prior in July 1939.

After the declaration of war he resumed the post of his successor, Pierre Boisselot, who was mobilized and then deported to Germany. In poor health and demoralized, Bernadot died at fifty-eight on 25 June 1941. For the rest of the war, teams were dispersed and publications suspended, with the exception of La Vie spirituelle.

=== 21st century ===
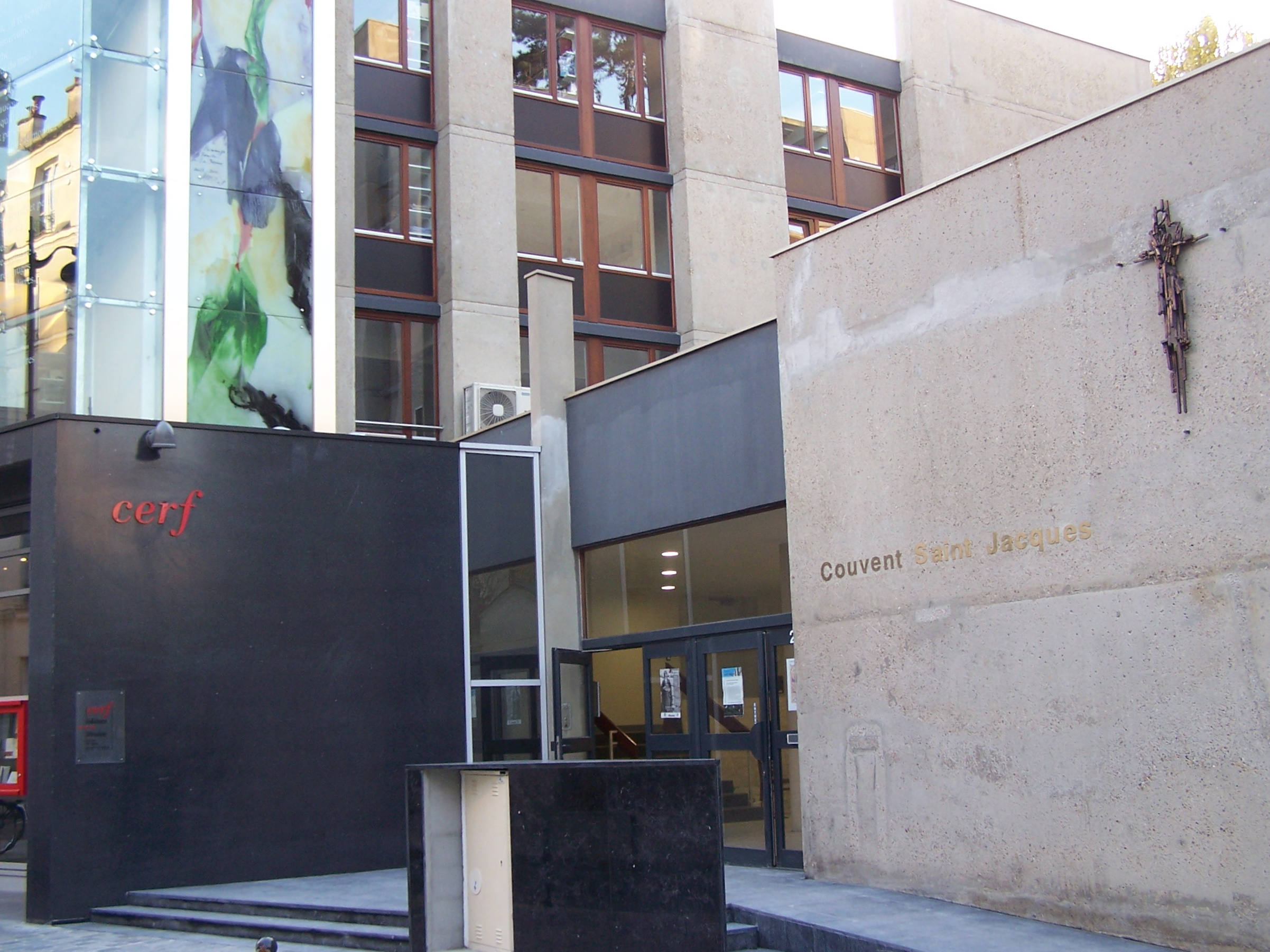
Current headquarters on Rue des Tanneries in Paris.

In 2011 the headquarters moved to the Couvent Saint-Jacques at 24 Rue des Tanneries.

In 2013 Jean-François Colosimo, after resigning as head of the Centre national du livre, was appointed chair of the management board of Éditions du Cerf, with a mandate to return to break-even after three years of significant losses and to consolidate the editorial line. Part of the former team left the house. The number of employees was reduced from 49 to 15. More importantly, the editorial line shifted toward authors and titles with greater media resonance: notably Adieu Mademoiselle by Eugénie Bastié (2016), Le Porc émissaire: terreur ou contre-révolution by Laetitia Strauch-Bonart (2018), Vous avez dit conservateur ? by Kévin Boucaud-Victoire (2016), La Guerre des gauches by Mathieu Bock-Côté (2017), and L’Empire du politiquement correct (2019). Also L’Erreur de calcul (2014) and Le Nouveau Pouvoir (2017) by Régis Debray, Notre liberté contre leur libéralisme by Clémentine Autain (2018), and Le Désordre idéologique by Gaël Brustier (2017).

==== Controversy ====
In 2016 twenty-seven Dominicans around Henri Burin des Roziers launched a petition against the intrusion of a "perverse right". They said they were saddened to see Colosimo attend the 50th anniversary of Valeurs actuelles, which would break with a progressive tradition "that has been the honor of the Dominican Order in France."

According to Joseph Confavreux (Mediapart), this petition did not prevent Cerf's editorial line from taking a "reactionary" turn, notably with the 2019 publication of L’Émancipation promise by political scientist Pierre-André Taguieff.

== Directors ==
Directors
From	To	Director
1929	1939	Marie-Vincent Bernadot
1939	1946	Pierre Boisselot
1946	1949	Dominique Dubarle
1949	1964	Pierre Boisselot
1964	1971	Bernard Bro
1971	1975	Réginald Ringenbach
1975	1979	François Refoulé
1979	1984	Gérard Eschbach
1984	1984	François Refoulé
1985	1995	Pascal Moity
1995	2005	Nicolas Séd
2005	2013	Éric de Clermont-Tonnerre
2013		Jean-François Colosimo

== Publications ==
Éditions du Cerf publishes the Bible de Jérusalem, a Catholic translation of the Bible into contemporary formal French. The first edition appeared in 1956, the second in 1977, and the third in 1998.

== Series ==
The main Cerf series, in chronological order:

- Sources chrétiennes, created in 1941 by Henri de Lubac, Jean Daniélou, and Claude Mondésert
- Lex orandi, created in 1944 by the Centre national de pastorale liturgique
- Lectio divina, created in 1946
- 7th Art, created in 1952
- Initiations, created in 1955
- Jusqu'à la joie, created in 1961 by Eliette Boulen – Christian lyric poems
- Cogitatio fidei, created in 1963 by Claude Geffré
- Rites et symboles, created in 1973 by the Centre national de pastorale liturgique
- La Nuit surveillée, a publishing house created in Paris in 1982 by Jacques Rolland; became a series at Éditions Verdier in 1983, then at Cerf from 1985
- Passages, created in 1986 by Heinz Wismann
- Humanités, created in 1994 by Jean-Marc Ferry
- Josèphe et son temps, created in 1996 by Étienne Nodet
- Philosophie et théologie, created in 1996 by Philippe Capelle
- Histoire religieuse de l'Europe contemporaine, created in 1997 by Yves-Marie Hilaire
- Histoire du christianisme, created in 1997 by Guy Bedouelle
- Cerf Littérature, created in 2000 by Sylvie Parizet
- Les Cahiers d'Histoire de la Philosophie, created in 2004
- Sources franciscaines, created in 2008 by Jacques Dalarun
- Cerf Politique, created in 2010
- Orthodoxie, created in 2010 under the direction of Hyacinthe Destivelle, O.P., and Archpriest Jivko Panev, in connection with the website Orthodoxie.com

== See also ==
- Order of Preachers
- La Bible d'Alexandrie
