= Apologia =

Formal defense of an opinion, position, or action

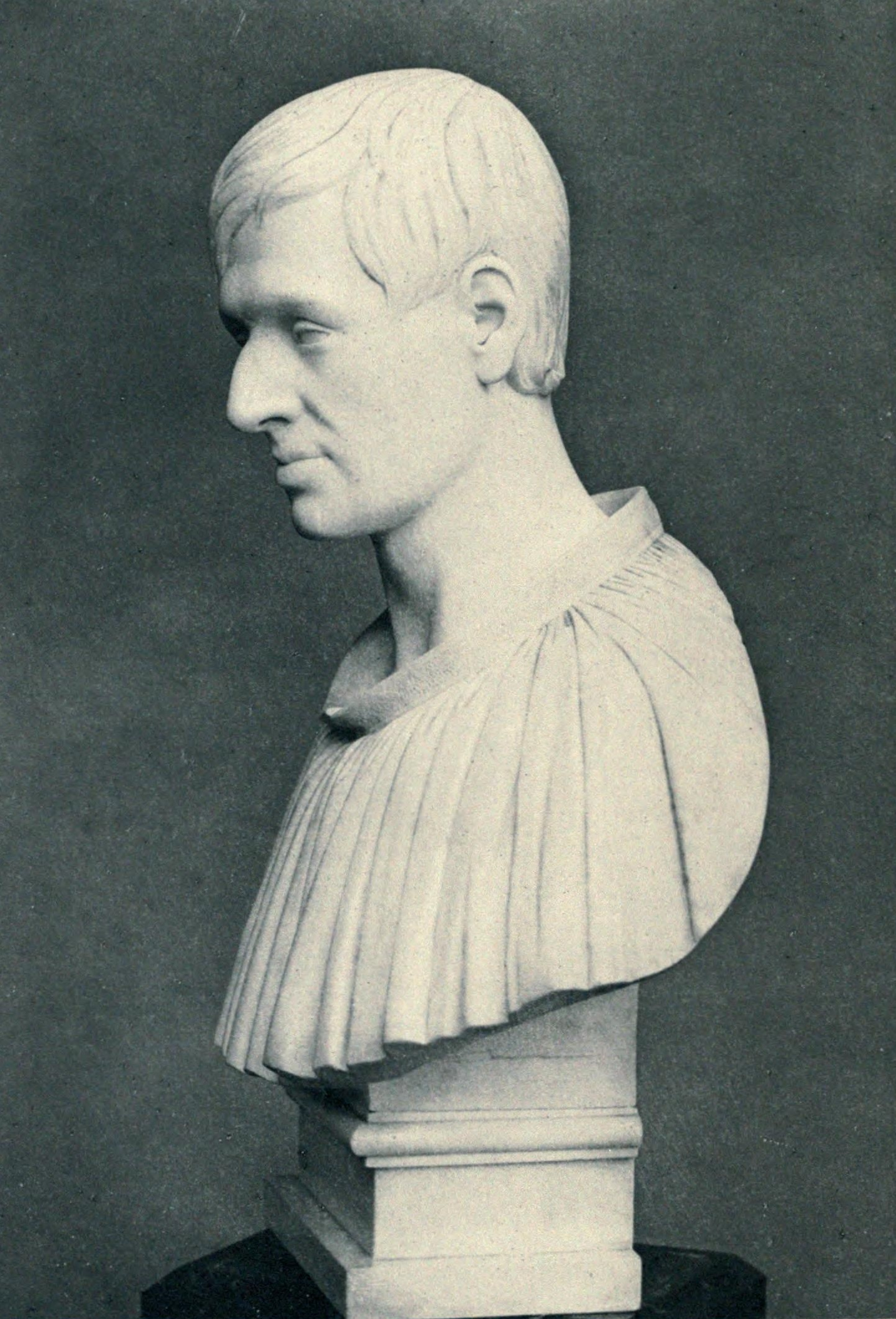
Bust of John Henry Newman, by T. Westmacott, 1841. Newman wrote an apologia to defend his decision to leave the Anglican church.

An apologia (Latin for apology, from Ancient Greek: ἀπολογία, lit. 'speaking in defense') is a formal defense of an opinion, position or action. The term's current use, often in the context of religion, theology and philosophy, derives from Justin Martyr's First Apology (AD 155–157) and was later employed by John Henry Newman's Apologia Pro Vita Sua (English: A Defense of One's Own Life) of 1864, which presented a formal defense of the history of his Christian life up to the time of his acceptance by the Catholic Church in 1845.

In Ancient Greece, an apologia was primarily used as a legal defense: The accuser would present a kategoria, or accusation, and the defendant would present his apologia, or defense. In modern usage, apologia describes a formal defense of an idea or belief, rather than against a legal charge. In both ancient and modern uses it differs from an apology, or expression of regret. The main difference between the two is that the act of apologizing is meant to express regret, and the purpose of an apologia is to clearly communicate the rational grounds for a belief or position. As an example, a person might apologize for bumping into another person, but could write an apologia to explain why they believe a specific belief is superior to another specific belief.

== Etymology ==
The etymology of apologia (Ancient Greek: ἀπολογία) is derived from the root word apologos (ἀπόλογος), 'a speech in defense', and the corresponding verb form apologeisthai (ἀπολογεῖσθαι), 'to speak in one's defense'.

== Greek philosophy ==
The Greek philosophers Plato, Isocrates, and Aristotle described apologia as an oratory to defend positions or actions particularly in the sense of a legal defense.

Socrates believed an apology to be a well-thought justification of accusations made. Socrates represents this act of defending oneself in Plato's Apology. Socrates justified the claims made against him by being direct and honest. Socrates' attempts at justification rather than expressing remorse were unsuccessful, demonstrating the complexity in apologies among individuals.

== Roman empire ==
Justin Martyr wrote the First Apology (c. AD 155) and Second Apology to explain the philosophical basis for Christianity and to encourage the Roman Emperor Antoninus Pius and the Roman Senate to stop the persecution and martyrdom of early Christians.

== Evolution of usage ==
The earliest English use of apologia followed from the Greek sense "a speech in defense". Writing in the Renaissance period, Thomas More wrote his Apologye of Syr Thomas More, Knyght, made by him Anno 1533 after he had geuen over the office of Lord Chancellour of Englande. In this, he explained his actions as Lord Chancellor under Henry VIII and denied rumors about his treatment of Protestants.

In 1590, a parallel meaning emerged meaning a "frank expression of regret". This parallel sense associated with "apologizing" for a wrong, progressively became the predominant usage until the 18th century, when the older Latin meaning re-emerged to be recorded in 1784. This became the dominant meaning, owing in a large part to the publication of the influential work, Apologia Pro Vita Sua, in 1865.

=== Apologia Pro Vita Sua ===
John Henry Newman was regarded as a premiere religious figure even before writing his definitive 1864 essay, Apologia Pro Vita Sua (translated as "Apology for One's Own Life" or "A Defense of One's Own Life"). The main subject of the essay was to explain how he, having been raised as an Anglican Christian, had decided to convert to Catholicism. The backdrop for the essay was a heated mid-century theological controversy. Newman and other Anglicans were calling for the Anglican church to return to earlier, more disciplined, traditions and an authoritarian hierarchy. Friction during the years from 1833 to 1841 led Newman and his allies in the Oxford Movement to publish a statement, the Tracts for the Times, to which Newman was a contributor. The tensions culminated in Newman's 1845 resignation as Anglican vicar of St. Mary's, Oxford and his departure from the Anglican church seeking to join the Roman Catholic Church.^{[1]}

One of Newman's rivals was Anglican Charles Kingsley of the Broad Church party, who responded to Newman's departure with written attacks impeaching Newman's truthfulness and honor. Newman's response was the flowing, almost poetic prose of the Apologia Pro Vita Sua, offering a spiritual autobiographical defense to Kingsley's accusations. The book was ultimately very well received by Anglicans and Catholics and was influential in turning public opinion in favor of Newman. The book became a bestseller that remains in print today. Two years after its publication, Newman was ordained by the Roman Catholics and soon became established as one of the foremost exponents of Catholicism in England.^{[1]}

=== Apologia Pro Marcel Lefebvre ===
In the 1970s, Roman Catholic writer Michael Davies wrote a three-volume work entitled Apologia Pro Marcel Lefebvre, defending the SSPX founder, Archbishop Marcel Lefebvre. Davies wrote in his introduction to the first volume that the use of the term apologia in the title is used as a "reasoned explanation", rather than literal apology, in the same vein as the early Christian apologists.

== Modern analysis ==
Sharon Downey argued in 1993 that apologia has undergone significant changes because its function has changed throughout history. Downey takes on a critical generic approach to the feasibility of apologia.

Halford Ryan advocates that apologia should be understood as part of a pair with kategoria (κατηγορία), an accusatory speech that motivates apologia as a defensive response. Ryan argues that these should be treated as a single rhetorical speech set.

Ware and Linkugel (1973) identified four common strategies seen in apologetic discourse, which are denial, bolstering, differentiation, and transcendence.

== See also ==
- Christian apologetics
