= Dialogue with Trypho =

Second-century Christian apologetic text by Justin Martyr

- 1636 edition of the collected works of Justin Martyr
- Author: Justin Martyr
- Language: Koine Greek
- Subject: Christian–Jewish relations; Christology; Biblical interpretation; polemics
- Genre: Christian apologetics
- Set in: Ephesus, Asia; Roman Empire
- Publication date: c. 155–160 AD
- Media type: Manuscript

Dialogue with Trypho is an extant second-century Christian apologetic work by the theologian Justin Martyr. Together with his First and Second Apologies, it is generally dated to c. 155–160 CE. The text is commonly understood as an attempt to demonstrate that Christianity constitutes the new law for all humanity and to prove from Scripture that Jesus is the Messiah. The work is cast as an intellectual dialogue between Justin and Trypho, a Jew displaced from Judaea following the Bar Kokhba Revolt, and is set in Ephesus, in western Asia Minor.

The work's central claim is that the Hebrew Scriptures properly belong to Christians, who alone apprehend their true meaning—an understanding that, in Justin's view, Jews entirely lack. This argument rests on three propositions: that Christ has superseded the Mosaic Law, rendering Jewish observance obsolete; that the biblical prophecies are fulfilled in Christ; and that the Christian community constitutes the "new Israel," inheriting the status once held by the Jewish people.

The text has also been described as foundational to the nascent tradition of Christian writings "against the Jews". Justin Martyr writes that God never truly wanted sacrifices but legislated them only to distract Jews from idolatry; and what appear to be biblical laws are really allegories about Christ, readable only through "spiritual" understanding. The text also includes a denunciation of Valentinians, Marcionites, and other sects as not genuinely Christian. The work is also cited for Justin's still referring to apostolic writings as memoires rather than scripture, confirming that the idea of a Christian canonical collection had not yet solidified in his time.

== Background ==
=== Author ===
Dialogue with Trypho was composed by Justin Martyr, a Christian apologist. He was born around 100 AD in Flavia Neapolis (modern Nablus), in the region of Samaria, then part of the Roman province of Judaea (later, Syria Palaestina). Born to pagan parents, he appears to have converted to Christianity in Ephesus before later establishing a school in Rome during the reign of Emperor Antoninus Pius (r. 138–161). In the work, he presents himself as a philosopher. After a period of teaching and writing, he was tortured and executed under the Roman prefect Junius Rusticus, whose tenure ran from 162 to 168 AD.

Justin Martyr is regarded as a "proto-orthodox" writer, part of a broader group that includes Clement of Alexandria, Irenaeus, Hippolytus, Tertullian, and Origen. Their works were preserved largely because of their usefulness to the 4th-century imperial Church. (Note: The term "proto-orthodox," however, is a retrospective label, not one these authors themselves would have recognized.)

In Justin's own day there was no unified Christian movement but rather a landscape of competing movements, some of them holding positions about scripture and salvation that differed fundamentally from Justin's own, including some that had no place for Jewish scripture at all. His thought operates within the same Middle Platonic philosophical tradition also evident in the ideas of Valentinus (from Egypt) and Marcion (from Sinope), two other second-century theologians, although they were his rivals and he was hostile toward them. Nevertheless, all three were highly educated figures who converged on Rome and found themselves confronting the same theological problem: how the divine figure of the Jewish Scriptures relates to the God revealed through Christ. They reached different conclusions, however, reflected in the dualistic theology of Marcionism and the Gnostic school of Valentinianism.

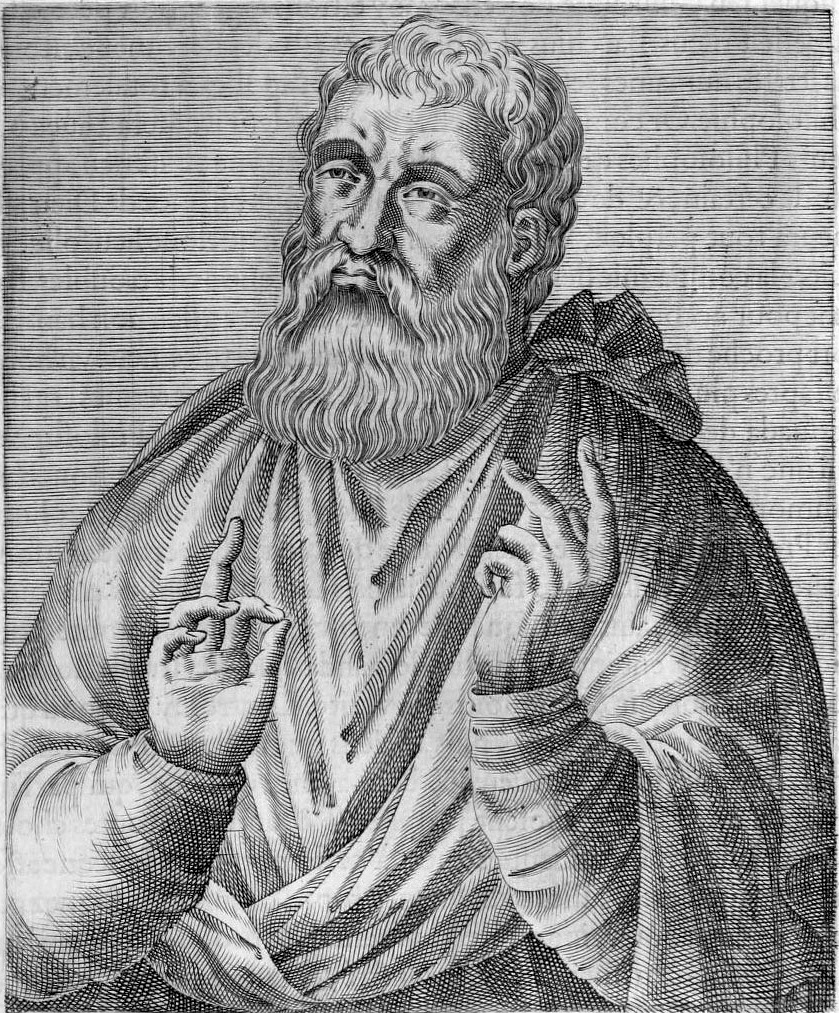
Justin Martyr

=== Dating ===
Because the text mentions Justin Martyr's First Apology, which was written sometime between AD 150 and 155, Dialogue with Trypho must have been written after it. The date of authorship has been suggested to have been written anywhere between 155 and 167, with some scholars favoring 155–160, or even a more specific date, c. 160.

=== Identity of Trypho ===
Justin's interlocutor is Trypho, who is described as a "circumcised Jewish refugee from the last war", in reference to the Bar Kokhba Revolt, and is said to live in Corinth. He is also presented as a student of philosophy who was encouraged by his former teacher to converse with other philosophers and now follows that advice. Marc Hirshman, a scholar of rabbinic law, notes that "the purportedly Jewish traditions are almost exclusively contained in Justin's remarks and are almost never raised by Trypho".

Theologian Manfred Hoffman writes that Trypho is portrayed in the work as "the representative of the blind and hard-hearted Jewish people." This view has been challenged by Marc Hirshman, who notes that Trypho is said in Chapter 2.10 to have read the Gospel and been impressed by it. Hirshman characterizes him as "at best incredulous, sometimes wary, but mostly respectful and appreciative of the power of Justin's argument."

The identity of Trypho as Rabbi Tarfon has been proposed, but many Jewish scholars do not accept this notion. They instead consider Trypho a fictional character invented by Justin for his literary purposes.

== Form and structure ==
=== Setting ===
The setting is presented as a chance meeting between Justin and Trypho in Ephesus. Justin had just converted to Christianity from a philosophical background and Trypho had just fled the disturbances in Judaea. When Justin suggests to Trypho to convert to Christianity, the dialogue becomes animated. Trypho criticizes Christians on a number of grounds, and Justin provides answers to each criticism.

According to Matthijs den Dulk, the book is "the oldest preserved literary dialogue between a Jew and a Christian". However, because Trypho's role is largely limited to posing questions and listening to Justin's responses rather than actively engaging in debate, Marc Hirshman observes that the work functions more as a "soliloquy" than a true dialogue. Throughout much of the text, Trypho's questions serve primarily as prompts for Justin’s extended arguments. Sections approaching genuine debate are largely confined to chapters 45–49, on whether Jewish law remains binding, and chapters 67–68, on the Virgin Birth. Beyond these, and particularly after chapter 90, Trypho recedes into the role of an attendant listener.

=== Length ===
The Dialogue is a work of extraordinary length. No surviving Christian text from the first 150 years is longer, surpassing even the three Synoptic Gospels taken together. Its original form was apparently even longer than what survives, since scribes appear in places to have shortened long scriptural quotations, a fact detectable when Justin refers back to passages of which only a portion now remains in the text.

=== Structure ===
Although the work presents itself as an effort at persuasion, it ends after two days of discussion with neither Trypho nor his fellow Jews persuaded.

== Theological content ==
The Dialogue with Trypho's central contention is that the Hebrew scriptures are the property of the Christians, because they alone grasp their true meaning – a comprehension that Jews, in Justin's view, lack entirely. This idea is already found earlier, though in a less developed form, in the Epistle of Barnabas, written around 130 AD. His argument rests on three foundations: that Christ had replaced the Law of Moses, rendering Jewish observance obsolete; that the biblical prophecies find their fulfillment in Christ; and that the Christian community is the "new Israel", inheriting the status once held by the Jewish people.

Justin also accuses Jews of being blind, fleshly beings who cannot see beyond the text of religious law: "'For your ears are closed, your eyes are blinded, and the heart is hardened,' Jeremiah has cried; yet not even then do you listen. The Lawgiver is present, yet you do not see Him; to the poor the Gospel is preached, the blind see, yet you do not understand. You have now need of a second circumcision, though you glory greatly in the flesh." This concept finds its origin in the New Testament: Paul writes in 2 Corinthians 3:13-15 that "to this very day whenever Moses is read, a veil lies over their minds; but when one turns to the Lord, the veil is removed."

In the Dialogue, Justin also wrote, "For I choose to follow not men or men's doctrines, but God and the doctrines [delivered] by Him. For if you have fallen in with some who are called Christians, but who do not admit this [truth], and venture to blaspheme the God of Abraham, and the God of Isaac, and the God of Jacob; who say there is no resurrection of the dead, and that their souls, when they die, are taken to heaven; do not imagine that they are Christians." This passage is sometimes cited as evidence that the early church subscribed to the doctrine of soul sleep, though some claim that Justin's emphasis is on saying that denial of the resurrection of the dead is what makes them non-Christian, especially considering that he claims that "even after death souls are in a state of sensation" in Chapter 18 of his First Apology.

=== God of the Hebrew Bible ===
Justin Martyr states that the divine figure encountered throughout the Hebrew Scriptures is not God the Father, who is identified in the Dialogue as "the Father of All". (Note: In Chapter 65.1.) Instead, it is the pre-incarnate Christ—whom he calls "the other God"—who acts as the demiurge, actively creating, speaking, and commanding in the Hebrew Bible. In his view, God the Father never spoke directly to the people of Israel; rather, it was the pre-incarnate Christ who communicated with Moses, David, and other biblical figures.

Fredriksen notes that this argument served a double purpose: it allowed Justin to counter the claims of Valentinus and Marcion, who also distinguished the god of the Jews from the highest God but drew different conclusions, while simultaneously advancing his case against Jewish readers of scripture. Jewish resistance to Justin's reading, in his own presentation, only confirmed his argument, one directed as much against his Christian rivals against Jewish interpreters.

=== The Law and Covenant ===
In chapter 16, Justin presents a negative reading of the Jewish practice of circumcision as a punitive sign, given so "that you alone may suffer that which you now justly suffer; and that your land may be desolate, and your cities burned with fire; and that strangers may eat your fruit in your presence, and not one of you may go up to Jerusalem." Justin weaves together prophetic texts from Isaiah with warning passages from the Torah, directing the resulting argument at the devastation of Judea, the displacement of its Jewish population, and Hadrian's decree restricting Jewish entry to Jerusalem, all consequences of the Bar Kokhba Revolt. Circumcision thus separates the Jewish people from the Christians, while simultaneously designating them for retribution.

Justin contends that God never truly desired sacrificial offerings. He argues that the detailed sacrificial regulations in the Torah were instituted by God only as a safeguard against what he regarded as the Jewish people's persistent susceptibility to idolatry. He further maintains that sacrifice, by its very nature, belongs to the realm of idol worship. In chapter 40, Trypho asks Justin for proof that Jesus is the Messiah. In response, Justin interprets the Passover sacrifice as an initial type in a typological sequence pointing toward the Passion of Jesus. He then discusses Deuteronomy 16:2, where the Torah restricts the Passover sacrifice to the place God will choose as his sanctuary, understood as the Temple in Jerusalem. Justin goes on to argue that the destruction of the Temple and the permanent loss of Jerusalem to the enemies of the Jewish people during the Jewish–Roman wars demonstrate that the Passover sacrifice had always been intended as temporary. In his view, its true purpose was typological—a coded prediction of Jesus’ suffering. The same logic is extended to the Yom Kippur sacrifice. Trypho is portrayed as accepting the central thrust of the argument.

=== Millenarianism ===
Chapters 80–81 of the Dialogue bear witness to Justin's commitment to millenarianism – the expectation of a thousand-year reign of the righteous on earth, centered on Jerusalem, as the culmination of history. This belief was shared by another writer active in the second century, Irenaus. It was only a generation or so later that Origen would dismiss such expectations are too bound to the material world and too close to Jewish ways of thinking.

=== Theological argument on the Jewish–Roman wars ===
Justin integrates the aftermaths of the two major Jewish revolts in Judaea, the First Jewish Revolt (66–73 AD) and the Bar Kokhba Revolt (132–136 AD), into a single theologized historical schema. In this account, Jewish responsibility for the crucifixion led to the destruction of Jerusalem and its temple in the First Jewish Revolt, while the Bar Kokhba war made its consequences irreversible. Justin tells Trypho that the Roman destruction of Jerusalem and its temple came about justly, because the Jewish people had killed "the Just One, and his prophets before him". The permanent loss of the temple proved that its ritual observances, and the covenant bound up with them, had never been intended as a lasting dispensation. By fusing these two catastrophes into a single continuous narrative, Justin constructs a sequential case moving from the death of Jesus through divine retribution to a definitive verdict: that God's covenant with the Jewish people had come to an end, and that the Christian community had taken their place.

According to historian Paula Fredriksen, this argument belongs to a broader 2nd-century Christian interpretive habit of reading the Roman destruction of Jerusalem in 70 AD through the biblical lens of the Babylonian destruction of the city in 587/6 BC, treating it as the expression of divine judgement.

=== Stance toward rival Christian groups ===
Justin refuses to accept that followers of rival Christian teachers are indeed Christian. In Chapter 35:5–6, he objects that followers of Marcion, Valentinus, Basilides, and others are called by that name at all, saying that they "blaspheme the Creator of the Universe". He characterizes them as "really godless and impious heretics", whom he accuses of teaching "blasphemy, godlessness and stupidity in all respects." At chapter 80:3–4, the Dialogue goes so far as to instruct its readers not to regard these groups as Christians at all. Fredriksen situates this polemical stance within the dynamics of second-century intellectual Christian culture, in which each major teacher sought to define authentic Christianity against rival interpretations, and in which the aim was to win the argument rather than accurately represent the other side.

== Intended audience and purpose ==
For whom the Dialogue was intended remains a matter of scholarly debate. One reading takes the work at face value as an attempt to persuade Jewish readers, given that Trypho, a Jew, stands as Justin's interlocutor throughout. A second position sees the work's main purpose as directed inward, helping Christian readers define what their community is and where it ends. A third view proposes that Justin's real concern is with Gentiles drawn toward Judaism. His aim, on this reading, is to persuade them that Christianity rather than Judaism is where the promises of scripture find their proper conclusion.

=== The Dialogue as anti-Jewish polemic ===
The Dialogue is most often read primarily as a confrontation between Christianity and Judaism. Paula Fredriksen identifies the work as a foundational text for the patristic tradition of writing adversus Iudaeos, a polemical literature composed against Jews and Judaism.

Shaye Cohen places the book among the early evidence for the "parting of the ways" between Judaism and Christianity by the mid-second century. In his reading, the very claim made by the work—that the Hebrew Scriptures have been correctly understood by Christians and misread by Jews—reinforces the assumption that the two groups already belonged to entirely separate communities by this period, at least as the text itself portrays it. He further describes it as one of two major second-century Christian anti-Jewish texts, alongside Melito of Sardis' On the Pascha, which was written around 170.

Several scholars have argued that beneath the surface of Justin's scriptural arguments lies a more fundamental aim: the discrediting of rabbinic authority itself. Since the rabbis are the guardians of Torah study, their delegitimization carries far-reaching consequences; in Marc Hirshman's words: "if they are discredited, Torah study – the oral transmission from teacher to pupil – is, in fact, moribund." Justin's exhortation to Trypho, "prefer to your own teachers the Christ of almighty God", in Chapter 142.3, is identified by P.J. Donahue as the distillation of Justin's entire polemic: the goal throughout is not to win a scriptural argument but to displace the rabbi as the authoritative interpreter of Jewish scripture. Hirshman writes that the Dialogue is "not a true conversation with Judaism, as it represented in extant rabbinic literature", but rather "a powerful and persuasive Christian readings of the Bible accompanied by an acerbic indictment of a putative Jewish reading of Scripture and its attendant life-style."

=== The Dialogue as intra-Christian polemic against heresies ===
Several scholars see the Dialogue as a polemic text against rival Christian movements, later labelled "heresies". The Greek term later used to mean "heresy" (hairesis, meaning "school of thought") appears six times in the Dialogue, alongside its cognate form meaning "heretic", in striking contrast to its single appearance in Justin’s First Apology and its complete absence from the Second.

Patristics scholar Alain Le Boulluec has argued that Justin is the figure who first gave the concept of "heresy" its distinctive Christian form, a view that has attracted criticism but has nonetheless contributed to establishing Justin as a writer whose work helped shape how Christianity identified and condemned internal dissent.

Another scholar who views the work through the lens of inter-Christian polemic is Matthijs den Dulk, who argues that interpreting the text primarily as a Christian polemic against Judaism obscures the extent to which Justin Martyr was simultaneously engaged in debate with rival Christian communities, a dimension he considers essential to understanding the work. He stresses that the work is concerned not only with Jewish–Christian relations, but also with the internal development of Christianity as a religion seeking to define and delimit its own boundaries. For him, the Dialogue is a milestone in the history of Christian heresiological discourse, describing its engagement with both Judaism and pagan philosophies as driven in significant part by his need to establish his own account of Christian faith as more credible than those of his Christian rivals. Nevertheless, he identifies the Dialogue as among the most important documents for understanding how Jews and Christians related to one another in the ancient world, and more broadly for tracing how the two came to form "two separate religious and cultural systems".

For historian David Rokeah, Justin's primary concern is not to argue against Jews, but to counter heretical challenges to the validity of the Torah. On this reading, divine law carries within it both a remedial and a retributive dimension, and the fate of the Jewish people represented the outworking of what had always been implicit in the covenant itself.

=== The Dialogue as an attempt to suppress Jewish tendencies within early Christianity ===
According to historian of early Christianity and Judaism, Abel Mordechai Bibliowicz, the Dialogue addresses a major point of contention within the early Jesus movement: the continued influence of the earliest Jewish followers of Jesus over much of Justin's audience, which he considers to have consisted largely of Gentile Christians adhering to what he terms the Pauline–Lukan tradition. In his view, Justin understood himself as occupying a middle position between Marcion on one side and those within the Jesus movement who championed the legacy of its Jewish founders on the other. Bibliowicz charaterizes the Dialogue as addressing what he calls "Judaism within" – the pull that Jewish-oriented forms of Christianity exercised within the movement, as distinct with any encounter with Judaism as a tradition standing outside it. He further contends that an audience of Jewish readers would have found the engagement with Jewish tradition within the Dialogue too thin to be persuasive, whereas Gentile readers would have lacked the background to notice its limitations.

== The cursing of Christ and Birkat haMinim ==
The Dialogue raises the charge that Jews were cursing Christian believers, or Christ himself, within their synagogues. Scholars have long associated this claim with early evidence for the Jewish prayer known as the Birkat haMinim, a curse on "minim", or heretics, which forms part of Jewish rabbinical liturgy to this day.

Scholar of religion Ruth Clements described the identification of the cursing with Birkat haMinim as not conclusively established, and instead suggested to link it to the theological problem posed by Deuteronomy 21:22–23, according which someone executed by hanging is "accursed," which challenges the Christian claim about Jesus. Justin responds by reinterpreting this "curse" typologically, claiming it foreshadows not only Christ's fate but also the later behavior of Jews who curse Christians, presenting this as proof of their continued error and refusal to repent "even when your city is captured, and your land [is] ravaged."

Historian Shaye J. D. Cohen also argued against identifying the passage with the Birkat haMinim, basing his view on three grounds. First, he notes that the prayer makes no reference to Christ or to the kind of Gentile Christians described by Justin Martyr. Second, its circulation appears to have been limited to Jewish communities in the Land of Israel and the eastern diaspora in Babylonia, whereas the Dialogue is set in Ephesus and may have been composed in Rome—locations where Justin would likely not have known the prayer. Third, when the prayer is attested in Byzantine Palaestina in the late 4th century CE by Church Fathers Epiphanius and Jerome, they report that Jews cursed the Nazarenes three times daily; this suggests that the target was Jewish Christians rather than the Gentile Christians represented by Justin.

== Testimonia and sources ==
Several chapters of the Dialogue share a recurring cluster of prophetic texts, all circling the same themes: the killing of the "Just One," God's punishment of those responsible, and the emergence of a new Gentile people in their place. (Note: Including chapters 16–17, 24–25, and 119.) Historian Oskar Skarsaune identified this cluster as a pre-existing collection of proof-texts that Justin inherited rather than assembled himself, one already shaped within a Gentile Christian context. Where Justin made his own distinctive contribution, according to Ruth Clements, was in anchoring this inherited material to the consequences of the Bar Kokhba Revolt. She notes that Skarsaune himself remained uncertain on this point.

As Clements notes, Justin had already used the blessing given by Jacob to his son Judah in Genesis 49:10, according which "the scepter will not depart from Judah… until Shiloh comes..." However, the two presentations differ in their treatment of the prophecy. In the First Apology, its fulfillment is demonstrated through Rome's subjugation of Judea. In chapter 52 of the Dialogue, by contrast, Justin makes no appeal to Roman conquest. Instead, he locates the evidence for its fulfillment within Jewish history itself: the disappearance of sovereign kingship and the cessation of prophecy among the Jewish people.

In Chapter 29.2, Justin refers to the apostolic writings as "memoires", a term that points to the unsettled status of apostolic texts in his day, when no distinctly Christian body of scripture had yet been defined and separated from the Jewish scriptures that Christians also claimed. A decisive step in that direction was taken by Marcion, who is known to have assembled a collection of Christian texts—a single gospel (known as the "Gospel of Marcion") alongside a corpus of Pauline epistles—and in doing so effectively anticipated what would become the earliest known Christian canon. That Justin, writing after Marcion, still used the informal designation "memoires" for apostolic writings suggests that Marcion's innovation had not yet displaced older habits of reference among all Christian authors. In later developments, the formation of a distinct Christian scriptural collection, the New Testament, provided the basis for reclassifying the Jewish scriptures as the "Old Testament" in relation to it.

== Research history ==
Despite its importance, the Dialogue received comparatively little scholarly engagement since Skarsaune's monograph on the topic, a situation den Dulk links in part to its extraordinary length and complexity. In his critical edition (with French translation), Philippe Bobichon demonstrates the particular nature of this text, equally influenced by Greek and Rabbinic thought.

== Editions ==
=== English ===
- Justin Martyr (1885). "Dialogue with Trypho" . In Roberts, Alexander; Donaldson, James (eds.). Ante-Nicene Christian Library. Vol. II. Translated by Reith, George. Edinburgh: T. & T. Clark..
- Justin Martyr (22 July 1995). Dialogue with Trypho, a Jew (PDF). Translated by Spade, Paul Vincent. Bloomington, Indiana, USA: Paul Vincent Spade. Archived from the original (PDF) on 2008-05-11., from the Greek text in van Winden 1971.

=== Greek ===
- van Winden, J. C. M. (1971). An Early Christian Philosopher: Justin Martyr's Dialogue with Trypho. Philosophia patrum. Vol. 1. Leiden: E. J. Brill.
- Bobichon, P. (2003). Dialogue avec Tryphon: édition critique (in French). Vol. 1. University of Fribourg. ISBN 978-2-8271-0958-6.
- Khazarzar, Ruslan (ed.). "Τοῦ ἁγίου Ἰουστίνου πρὸς Τρύφωνα Ἰουδαῖον Διάλογος". khazarzar.skeptik.net (in Ancient Greek).

== See also ==
- First Apology
- Second Apology
- Dialogue of Jason and Papiscus
- Christianity and Judaism

== Bibliography ==
=== Sources ===
- Bibliowicz, Abraham M. (2013). "The Anti-Jewish Strand in Justin: The Dialogue with Trypho the Jew". Jews and Gentiles in the Early Jesus Movement: An Unintended Journey. New York: Palgrave Macmillan. pp. 173–178.
- Clements, Ruth A. (2012). "Epilogue: 70 CE After 135 CE—The Making of a Watershed?". In Schwartz, Daniel R.; Weiss, Zeev (eds.). Was 70 CE a Watershed in Jewish History?. Leiden: Brill. pp. 517–536. ISBN 978-9-004-21534-4.
- Cohen, Shaye J. D. (2018). "The Ways that Parted: Jews, Christians, and Jewish-Christians, ca. 100–150 CE". In Schwartz, Joshua; Tomson, Peter J. (eds.). Jews and Christians in the First and Second Centuries: The Interbellum 70–132 CE. Leiden: Brill. pp. 307–339.
- den Dulk, Matthijs (2018). Between Jews and Heretics: Refiguring Justin Martyr's Dialogue with Trypho. Routledge Studies in the Early Christian World. London and New York: Routledge. ISBN 9780815373452.
- Fredriksen, Paula (2024). Ancient Christianities: The First Five Hundred Years. Princeton University Press. ISBN 978-0-691-15769-6.
- Rokeah, David (2002). Justin Martyr and the Jews. Brill.
- Hirshman, Marc (1993). "Polemic Literary Units in the Classical Midrashim and Justin Martyr's "Dialogue with Trypho"". The Jewish Quarterly Review. 83 (3/4): 369–384. JSTOR 1455159.
