= Henri-Irénée Marrou =

French historian

Henri-Irénée Marrou (French: [ɑ̃ʁi iʁene maʁu]; 12 November 1904 – 11 April 1977) was a French historian. A Christian humanist in outlook, his work was primarily in the spheres of Late Antiquity and the history of education. He is best known for his work History of Education in Antiquity. He also edited, for Sources Chrétiennes, the early Christian work Letter to Diognetus, the only manuscript of which perished in a fire at the University of Strasbourg during the Franco-Prussian War. Marrou edited the collection Patristica Sorbonensia, published by Le Seuil. His work has been criticised by the philosopher Ilsetraut Hadot. Marrou also wrote under the pseudonym of Henri Davenson. His Carnets posthumes were published in 2006 under the editorial supervision of his daughter Françoise Marrou-Flamant.

== Biography ==
Henri-Irénée Marrou was born on 12 November 1904 in Marseille. He died on 11 April 1977 in Bourg-la-Reine.

He was elected a foreign member of the Royal Netherlands Academy of Arts and Sciences in 1967.

== Publications ==
- Fondements d'une culture chrétienne, Paris, Bloud & Gay, 1934;
- Saint Augustin et la fin de la culture antique, Paris, De Boccard, 1938 (thèse principale);
- MOYCIKOC ANHP. étude sur les scènes de la vie intellectuelle figurant sur les monuments funéraires romains, Grenoble, Didier & Richard, 1938 (thèse secondaire);
- Traité de la musique selon l'esprit de saint Augustin, Paris, Le Seuil, 1942;
- Le livre des chansons ou introduction à la connaissance de la chanson, Paris, Le Seuil, 1944;
- Histoire de l'éducation dans l'Antiquité, Paris, Le Seuil, 1948;
  - A history of education in antiquity. Translated by George Lamb. Madison, Wisconsin: University of Wisconsin Press. 1982. ISBN 0299088146. LCCN 81070008; xviii+466 pages; pbk.
- L'ambivalence du temps de l'histoire chez saint Augustin, Paris, Vrin, 1950;
- De la connaissance historique, Paris, Le Seuil, 1954;
  - The meaning of history. Translated by Robert J. Olsen. Baltimore: Helicon. LCCN 63019405.
- Saint Augustin et l'augustinisme, Paris, Le Seuil, 1955;
- Les troubadours, Paris, Le Seuil, 1961;
- Nouvelle histoire de l'Église. Tome I, 2e partie: De la persécution de Dioclétien à la mort de Grégoire le Grand, Paris, Le Seuil, 1963;
- L'Église de l'Antiquité tardive 303-604, Paris, Le Seuil, collection « Points Histoire », 1985 (réédition séparée du titre précédent);
- Théologie de l'histoire, Paris, Le Seuil, 1968; réédition, Paris, Editions du Cerf, 2006;
- Patristique et humanisme, Paris, Le Seuil, 1976;
- Décadence romaine ou antiquité tardive?, Paris, Le Seuil, collection « Points Histoire », 1977 (posthume);
- Christiana tempora. Mélanges d'histoire, d'archéologie, d'épigraphie et de patristique, Rome, École française de Rome, 1978;
- Crise de notre temps et réflexion chrétienne (1930-1975), Paris, Beauchesne, 1978 (posthume);
- Carnets posthumes, Paris, Éditions du Cerf, 2006.

== See also ==
- Marguerite Harl
