= Modrzejewski =

Modrzejewski (feminine Modrzejewska) is a Polish surname. Notable people include:

- Helena Modrzejewska (1840–1909), Polish actress
- Joseph Mélèze-Modrzejewski (1930–2017), Polish-French historian
- Robert J. Modrzejewski (born 1934), American military officer
- Rudolf Modrzejewski (1861–1940), Polish-American civil engineer
