= Doutreleau =

Doutreleau is a French surname. Notable people with the surname include:

- Louis Doutreleau (1909–2005), French Jesuit priest
- Stephen Doutreleau (1693–after 1747), French Jesuit missionary
- Victoire Doutreleau (born 1934), French fashion model
