= Marguerite Harl =

French scholar (1919–2020)

- Born: Marguerite Marie Bayle; 3 April 1919; Dax
- Died: 30 August 2020 (aged 101); Paris
- Education: Doctor of Arts
- Alma mater: University of Paris Faculty of Humanities
- Occupation: Hellenist, collection manager, university teacher
- Employer: Paris-Sorbonne University (–1986)
- Spouse(s): Jean-Marie Harl

Marguerite Harl (3 April 1919 – 30 August 2020) was a French scholar, who worked on the Septuagint, Philo of Alexandria and early patristic writers such as Clement of Alexandria and Origen. She was born in Paris in April 1919 and became a pupil of Henri-Irénée Marrou. She was a professor of Ancient Greek at the Sorbonne University from 1958 to 1983.

Harl died in August 2020 at the age of 101.

== Festschrift ==
- Dorival, Gilles; Munnich, Olivier, eds. (1995). ΚΑΤΑ ΤΟΥΣ Ο'. « Selon les Septante ». Trente études sur la Bible grecque des Septante. En hommage à Marguerite Harl. Paris: Les Éditions du Cerf. p. 534. ISBN 2-204-05075-X.

== Bibliography ==
- Harl, Marguerite (1988). La Bible grecque des Septante (in French). Cerf.
- ——— (1992). La Langue de Japhet (in French). Cerf.
- ———. Le Déchiffrement du sens (in French). Institut d'études augustiniennes.
- ——— (2005). "La Bible en Sorbonne, ou la revanche d'Érasme". Esprit et Vie (139). Cerf: 28–29. Archived from the original on 2007-10-12.
- ———. L'Europe et les Pères. Nouvelle Cité.
- ———. Origène d'Alexandrie et la fonction révélatrice du Verbe incarné.
- ———; Dorival, Gilles; Munnich, Olivier (1994). La Bible grecque des Septante. Du judaïsme hellénistique au christianisme ancien. éditions du Cerf & CNRS Éditions. ISBN 2-222-04155-4.

== See also ==
- Catena (biblical commentary)
- Hellenistic Judaism
- Claude Mondésert
- Joseph Mélèze-Modrzejewski
- Bible translations into French
- La Bible d'Alexandrie
