= Heresy =

Belief that is strongly at variance with customs

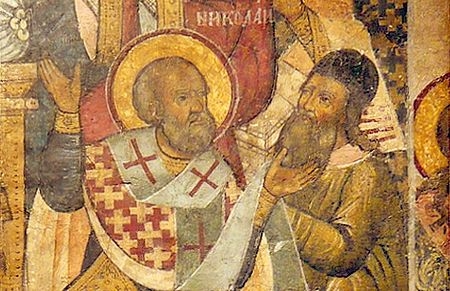
Saint Nicholas with Arius at the Council of Nicaea, at which Nicholas is said to have hit Arius; Arius was known for preaching that Jesus was created by God and has a lower status, a heresy in Trinitarianism.

Heresy is any belief or theory that is strongly at variance with established beliefs or customs, particularly the accepted beliefs or religious law of a religious organization. A heretic is a proponent of a heresy.

Heresy in Judaism, Christianity, and Islam has at times been met with censure ranging from excommunication to the death penalty.

Heresy is distinct from apostasy, which is the explicit renunciation of one's religion, principles, or cause, and from blasphemy, which is an impious utterance or action concerning God or sacred things. Heresiology is the study of heresy.

== Etymology ==
Derived from Ancient Greek haíresis (αἵρεσις), the English heresy originally meant "choice" or "thing chosen". However, it came to mean the "party, or school, of a man's choice", and also referred to that process whereby a young person would examine various philosophies to determine how to live.

The word heresy is usually used within a Christian, Jewish, or Islamic context, and implies slightly different meanings in each. The founder or leader of a heretical movement is called a heresiarch, while individuals who espouse heresy or commit heresy are known as heretics.

== Christianity ==
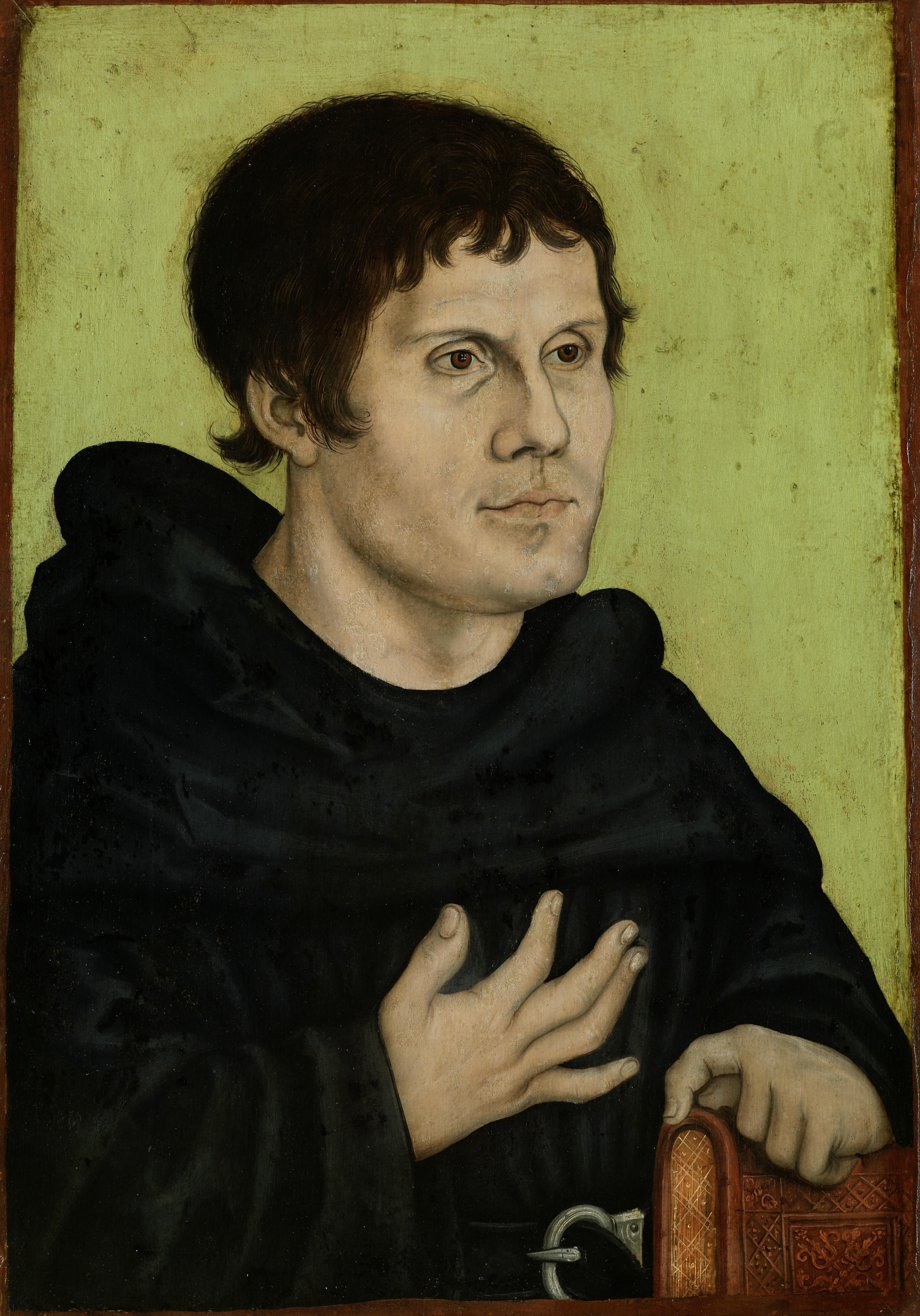
Former German Catholic friar Martin Luther was famously excommunicated as a heretic by Pope Leo X by his papal bull Decet Romanum Pontificem in 1520.

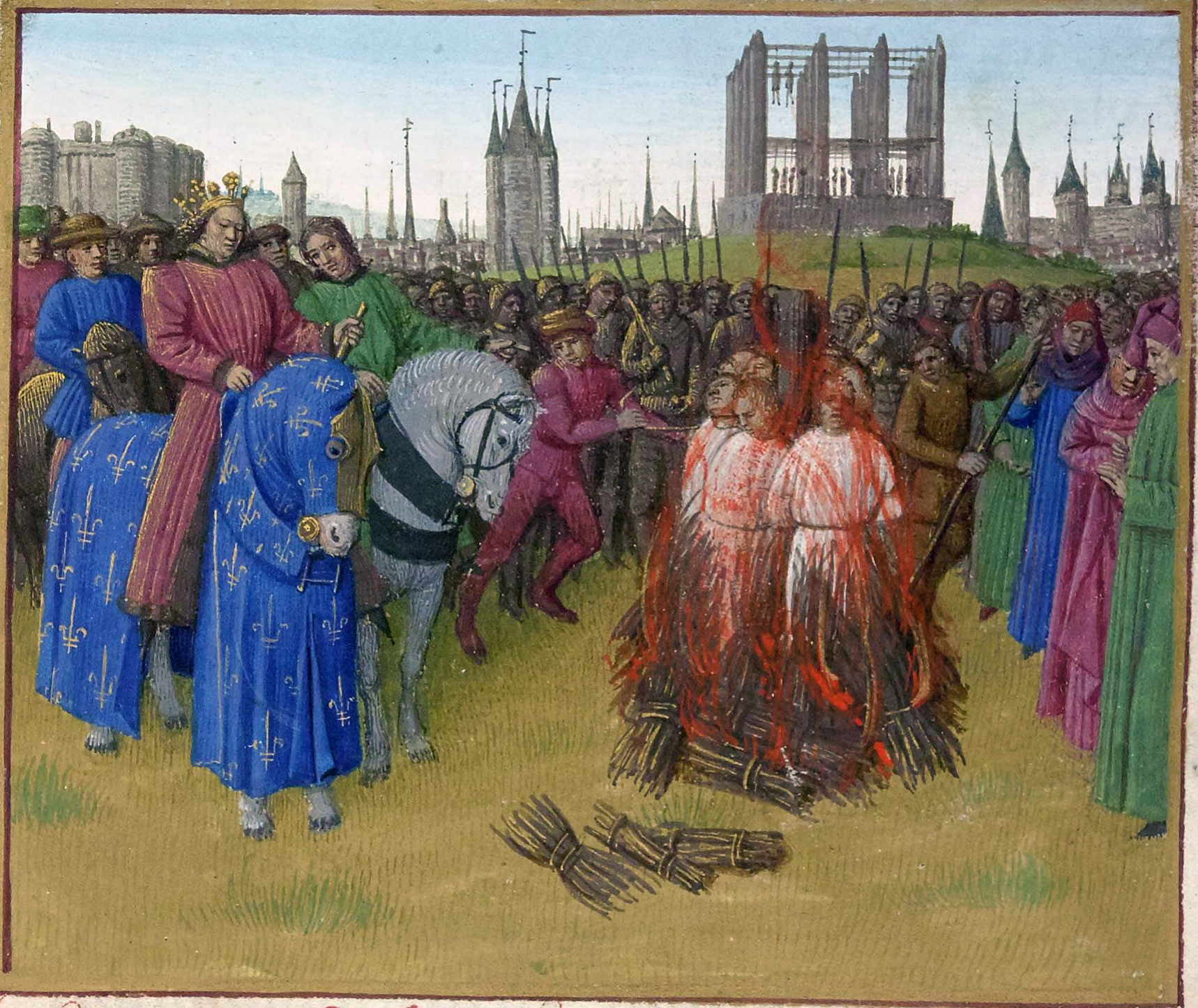
The burning of the pantheistic Amalrician heretics in 1210, in the presence of King Philip II Augustus. In the background is the Gibbet of Montfaucon and, anachronistically, the Grosse Tour of the Temple. Illumination from the Grandes Chroniques de France, c. AD 1455–1460.

In Titus 3:10, it is said that a divisive person should be warned twice before others separate from them. The Greek term for "divisive person" became a technical term in the early Church for a type of heretic who promoted dissension. In contrast, correct teaching is called "sound" because it strengthens orthodox belief and protects it against the "corrupting" influence of heretical teachers.

Tertullian (c. AD 155–240) implied that it was the Jews who most inspired heresy in Christianity: "From the Jew the heretic has accepted guidance in this discussion [that Jesus was not the Christ]." This is largely because Tertullian does not consider Christianity as an additional religion but rather a continuation of Judaism with the Jewish messianic component fulfilled.

The use of the word heresy was given wide currency by Irenaeus in his 2nd-century tract Contra Haereses (Against Heresies) to describe and discredit his opponents during the early centuries of the Christian community. He described the community's beliefs and doctrines as orthodox (from ὀρθός, orthos, "straight" or "correct" and δόξα, doxa, "belief") and the Gnostics' teachings as heretical. He also invoked the concept of apostolic succession to support his arguments.

Constantine the Great, who along with Licinius had decreed toleration of Christianity in the Roman Empire by what is commonly called the Edict of Milan, and was the first Roman Emperor baptized, set precedents for later policy. By Roman law the Emperor was Pontifex Maximus, the high priest of the College of Pontiffs (Collegium Pontificum) of all recognized religions in ancient Rome. To put an end to the doctrinal debate initiated by Arius, Constantine called the first of what would afterwards be called the ecumenical councils and then enforced orthodoxy by Imperial authority.

The first known usage of the term in a legal context was in AD 380 by the Edict of Thessalonica of Theodosius I, which made Christianity the state church of the Roman Empire. Prior to the issuance of this edict, the Church had no state-sponsored support for any particular legal mechanism to counter what it perceived as "heresy". By this edict the state's authority and that of the Church became somewhat overlapping. One of the outcomes of this blurring of Church and state was the sharing of state powers of legal enforcement with church authorities.

Within six years of the official criminalization of heresy by the Emperor, the first Christian heretic to be executed, Priscillian, was condemned in 386 by Roman secular officials for sorcery, and put to death with four or five followers. However, his accusers were excommunicated both by Ambrose of Milan and by Pope Siricius, who opposed Priscillian's heresy, but "believed capital punishment to be inappropriate at best and usually unequivocally evil". The edict of Theodosius II (435) provided severe punishments for those who had or spread writings of Nestorius. Those who possessed writings of Arius were sentenced to death.

In the 7th-century text Concerning Heresy, Saint John of Damascus named Islam as Christological heresy, referring to it as the "heresy of the Ishmaelites" (see medieval Christian views on Muhammad). The position remained popular in Christian circles well into the 20th century, by theologians such as the Congregationalist cleric Frank Hugh Foster and the Roman Catholic historian Hilaire Belloc, the latter describing it as "the great and enduring heresy of Mohammed".

For some years after the Reformation, Protestant churches were also known to execute those they considered heretics; for example, Michael Servetus was declared a heretic by both the Reformed Church and Catholic Church for rejecting the Christian doctrine of the Holy Trinity. The last known heretic executed by sentence of the Catholic Church was Spanish schoolmaster Cayetano Ripoll in 1826. The number of people executed as heretics under the authority of the various "ecclesiastical authorities" (Note: An "ecclesiastical authority" was initially an assembly of bishops, later the Pope, then an inquisitor (a delegate of the Pope) and later yet the leadership of a Protestant church (which would itself be regarded as heretical by the Pope). The definitions of "state", "cooperation", "suppress" and "heresy" were all subject to change during the past 16 centuries.) is not known. (Note: Only very fragmentary records have been found of the executions carried out under Christian "heresy laws" during the first millennium. Somewhat more complete records of such executions can be found for the second millennium. To estimate the total number of executions carried out under various Christian "heresy laws" from AD 385 until the last official Catholic "heresy execution" in 1826 would require far more complete historical documentation than is currently available. The Catholic Church by no means had a monopoly on the execution of heretics. The charge of heresy was a weapon that could fit many hands. A century and a half after heresy was made a state crime, the Vandals (a Germanic tribe professing Arianism, a Christian doctrine considered heretical by Catholics) used the law to prosecute thousands of (orthodox) Catholics with penalties of torture, mutilation, slavery and banishment. The Vandals were overthrown; orthodoxy was restored; "No toleration whatsoever was to be granted to heretics or schismatics." Heretics were not the only casualties. 4000 Roman soldiers were killed by heretical peasants in one campaign. Some lists of heretics and heresies are available. About seven thousand people were burned at the stake by the Catholic Inquisition, which lasted for nearly seven centuries. From time to time, heretics were burned at the stake by an enraged local populace, in a certain type of "vigilante justice", without the official participation of the Church or State. Religious wars slaughtered millions. During these wars, the charge of heresy was often leveled by one side against another as a sort of propaganda or rationalization for the undertaking of such wars.)

Although less common than in earlier periods, in modern times, formal charges of heresy within Christian churches still occur. Issues in the Protestant churches have included modern biblical criticism and the nature of God. In the Catholic Church, the Congregation for the Doctrine of the Faith criticizes writings for "ambiguities and errors" without using the word "heresy."

On 11 July 2007, Pope Benedict XVI stated that some Protestant groups are "ecclesial communities" rather than Churches. Representatives of some of these Christian denominations accused the Vatican of effectively calling them heretics. However, Pope Benedict XVI clarified that the phrase "ecclesial community" did not necessitate explicit heresy, but only that the communities lacked certain "essential elements" of an apostolic church, as he had written in the document Dominus Iesus.

=== Catholicism ===
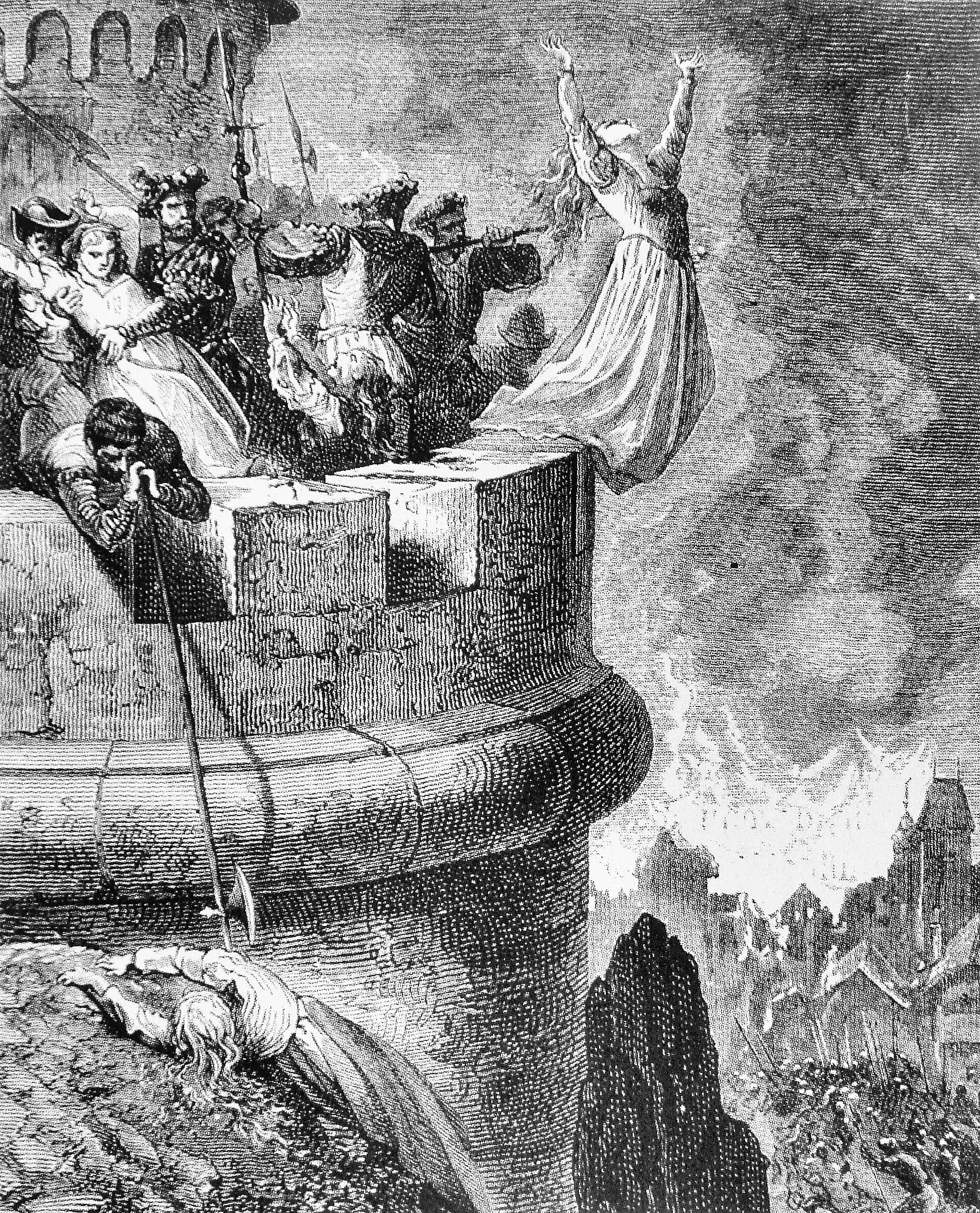
Massacre of the Waldensians of Mérindol in 1545

In the Catholic Church, obstinate and willful manifest heresy is considered to spiritually cut one off from the Church, meriting excommunication automatically (latae sententiae). The 1983 Code of Canon Law defines heresy as, "the obstinate denial or obstinate doubt after the reception of baptism of some truth which is to be believed by divine and Catholic faith".

The 6th century civil code Codex Justinianus (1:5:12) defines "everyone who is not devoted to the Catholic Church and to our Orthodox holy Faith" a heretic, disallowing such from positions of authority in the Eastern Roman Empire.

The Church had always dealt firmly with strands of Christianity that it considered heretical, but before the 11th century these tended to centre on individual preachers or small localised sects, like Arianism, Pelagianism, Donatism, Marcionism and Montanism. Jesuit historian David Collins has noted that in the roughly 700 years from the fall of the Roman Empire, there is only a single known execution of heretics.

The diffusion of the almost Manichaean sect of Paulicians westwards gave birth to the famous 11th- and 12th-century heresies of Western Europe. The first one was that of Bogomils in modern-day Bulgaria, a sort of sanctuary between Eastern and Western Christianity. By the 11th century, more organised groups such as the Patarini, the Dulcinians, the Waldensians and the Cathars were beginning to appear in the towns and cities of northern Italy, southern France and Flanders.

In France the Cathars grew to represent a popular mass movement and the belief was spreading to other areas, though some historians such as Robert Ian Moore point out a paucity of direct evidence. The Cathar Crusade was initiated by the Catholic Church to eliminate the alleged Cathar heresy in Languedoc.

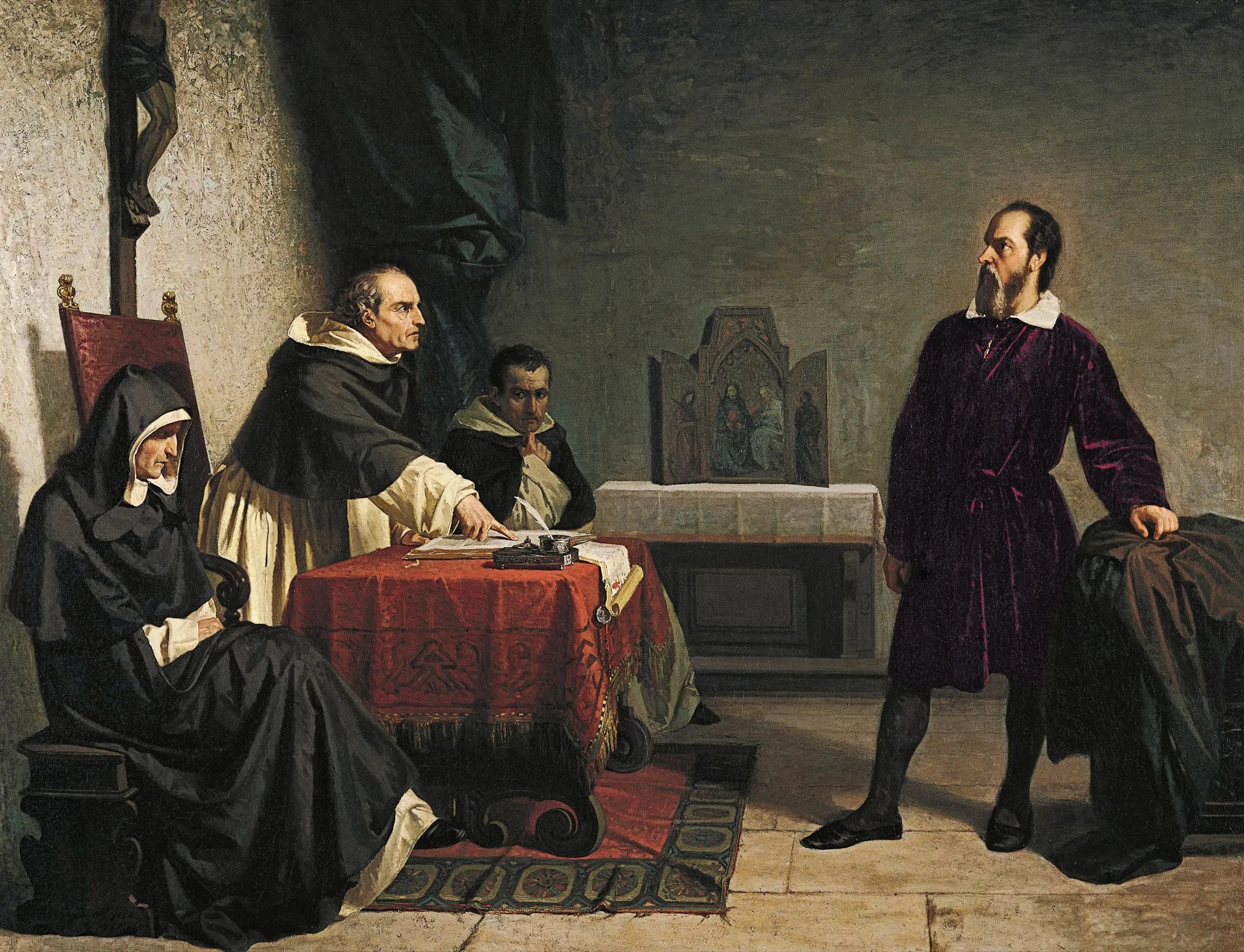
Cristiano Banti's 1857 painting Galileo facing the Roman Inquisition

Heresy was a major justification for the Inquisition (Inquisitio Haereticae Pravitatis, Inquiry on Heretical Perversity) and for the European wars of religion associated with the Protestant Reformation. Galileo Galilei was brought before the Inquisition for heresy, but abjured his views and was sentenced to house arrest, under which he spent the rest of his life. Galileo was found "vehemently suspect of heresy", namely of having held the opinions that the Sun lies motionless at the centre of the universe, and that the Earth is not at its centre and moves, and that one may hold and defend an opinion as probable after it has been declared contrary to Holy Scripture. He was required to "abjure, curse and detest" those opinions. Most contemporary historians of science believe the Galileo affair is an exception in the overall relationship between science and Christianity.

Pope Gregory I stigmatized Judaism and the Jewish people in many of his writings. He described Jews as enemies of Christ: "The more the Holy Spirit fills the world, the more perverse hatred dominates the souls of the Jews." He labeled all heresy as "Jewish", claiming that Judaism would "pollute [Catholics and] deceive them with sacrilegious seduction". The identification of Jews and heretics in particular occurred several times in Roman-Christian law.

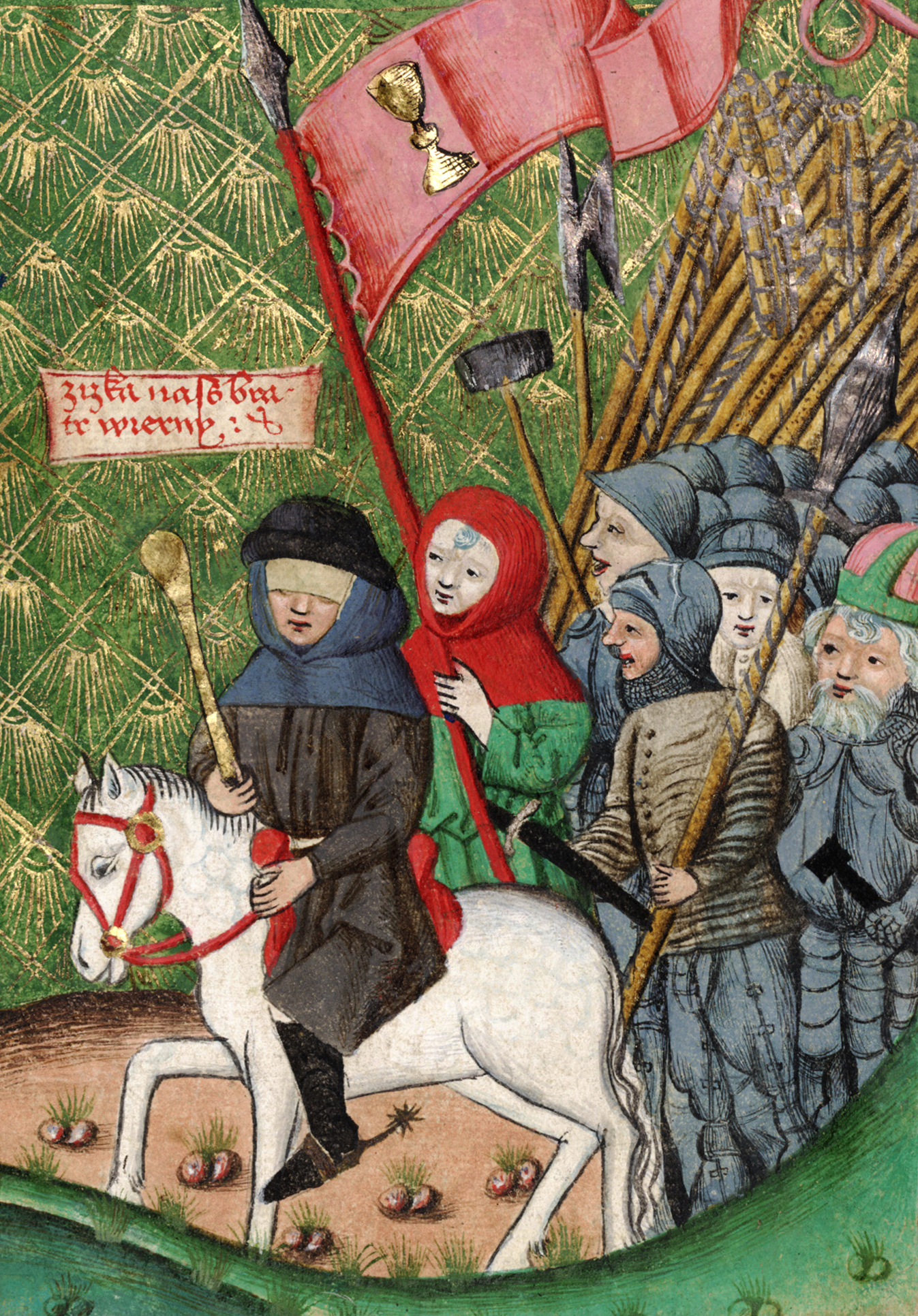
Between 1420 and 1431 the Hussite heretics defeated five anti-Hussite Crusades ordered by the Pope.

=== Lutheranism ===
Martin Luther and Philip Melanchthon, who played an instrumental part in the formation of the Lutheran Churches, condemned Johannes Agricola and his doctrine of antinomianism – the belief that Christians were free from the moral law contained in the Ten Commandments – as a heresy. Traditional Lutheranism, espoused by Luther himself, teaches that after justification, "the Law of God continued to guide people in how they were to live before God".

The Augsburg Confession of 1530, which is among the foundational documents of Lutheranism, lists 10 heresies by name which are condemned: Manichaeans, Valentinians, Arians, Eunomians, Mohammedans, Samosatenes, Pelagians, Anabaptists, Donatists and "certain Jewish opinions".

=== Anglicanism ===
The 39 Articles of the Anglican Communion condemn Pelagianism as a heresy.

In Britain, the 16th-century English Reformation resulted in a number of executions on charges of heresy. During the thirty-eight years of Henry VIII's reign, about sixty heretics, mainly Protestants, were executed and a rather greater number of Catholics lost their lives on grounds of political offences such as treason, notably Sir Thomas More and Cardinal John Fisher, for refusing to accept the king's supremacy over the Church in England. Under Edward VI, the heresy laws were repealed in 1547, only to be reintroduced in 1554 by Mary I; even so, two radicals were executed in Edward's reign (one for denying the reality of the incarnation, the other for denying Christ's divinity). Under Mary, around 290 people were burned at the stake between 1555 and 1558 after the restoration of papal jurisdiction. When Elizabeth I came to the throne, the concept of heresy was retained in theory but severely restricted by the Act of Supremacy 1558 (passed in 1559) and the one hundred and eighty or so Catholics who were executed in the forty-five years of her reign were put to death because they were considered members of "a subversive fifth column". The last execution for heresy in England occurred under James VI and I in 1612. Although the charge was technically one of blasphemy, there was one later execution in Scotland (still at that date an independent kingdom, albeit in personal union with England) when in 1697 Thomas Aikenhead was accused, among other things, of denying the doctrine of the Trinity.

Another example of the persecution of heretics under Protestant rule was the execution of the Boston martyrs in 1659, 1660, and 1661. These executions resulted from the actions of the Anglican Puritans, who at that time wielded political as well as ecclesiastic control in the Massachusetts Bay Colony. At the time, the colony leaders were apparently hoping to achieve their vision of a "purer absolute theocracy" within their colony. As such, they perceived the teachings and practices of the rival Quaker sect as heretical, even to the point where laws were passed and executions were performed with the aim of ridding their colony of such perceived "heresies".

=== Methodism ===
The Articles of Religion of the Methodist Churches teach that Pelagianism is a heresy.

John Wesley, the founder of the Methodist tradition, harshly criticized antinomianism, considering it the "worst of all heresies". He taught that Christian believers are bound to follow the moral law for their sanctification. Methodist Christians thus teach the necessity of following the moral law as contained in the Ten Commandments, citing Jesus' teaching, "If ye love me, keep my commandments" (cf. Saint John 14:15).

== Islam ==
Starting in medieval times, Muslims began to refer to heretics and those who antagonized Islam as zindiqs, the charge being punishable by death.

Ottoman Sultan Selim the Grim regarded the Shia Qizilbash as heretics. Shiites, in general, have often been considered heretics by Sunni Muslims, especially in Indonesia, Saudi Arabia and Turkey.

To Mughal Emperor Aurangzeb, Sikhs were heretics.

Ahmadiyya is widely considered by both Sunnis and Shias alike to be heresy due to their belief in prophets after Muhammad.

Despite not being considered Muslim, the Baháʼí Faith has been considered a heretical offshoot of Islam.

In 1989, Ruhollah Khomeini, supreme religious leader of Iran, issued a fatwa that declared the writing of Salman Rushdie to be heretical, and a bounty was issued for anyone who assassinated him. Heresy remains an offense punishable by death in some nations. The Baháʼí Faith is considered an Islamic heresy in Iran, with systematic persecution of Baháʼís.

== Judaism ==
Orthodox Judaism considers views on the part of Jews who depart from traditional Jewish principles of faith heretical. In addition, the more right-wing groups within Orthodox Judaism hold that all Jews who reject the simple meaning of Maimonides's 13 principles of Jewish faith are heretics. As such, most of Orthodox Judaism considers Reform and Reconstructionist Judaism heretical movements, and regards most of Conservative Judaism as heretical. The liberal wing of Modern Orthodoxy is more tolerant of Conservative Judaism, particularly its right wing, as there is some theological and practical overlap between these groups.

== Other religions ==
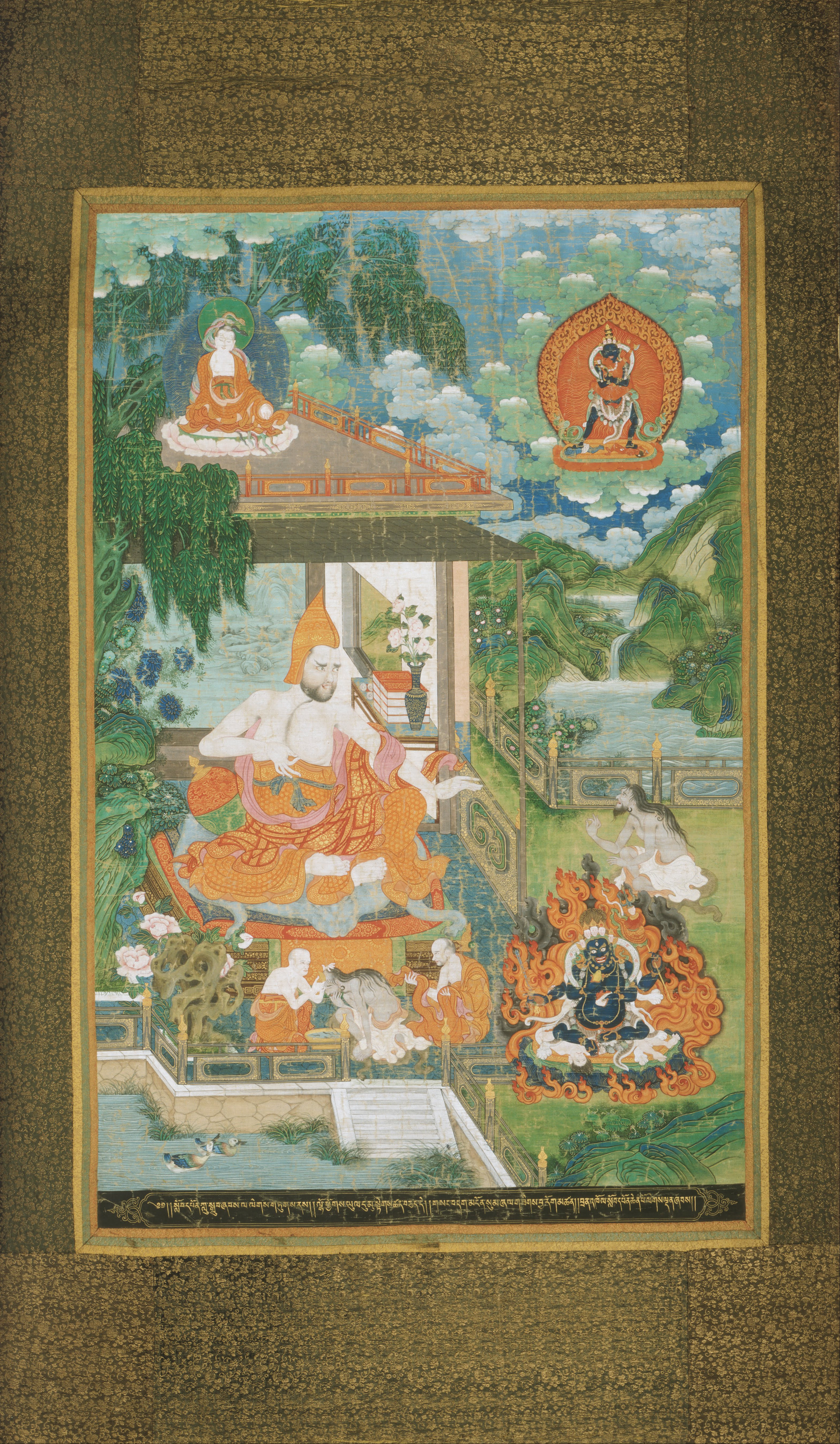
A Tibetan style painting depicting the Buddhist philosopher Bhāviveka converting a tirthika (non-Buddhist) through debate.

The Buddhist concept closest to "heresy" is that of the "tīrthika", a term used by Buddhists to refer to followers of other religious paths. According to Buddhist doctrine, tīrthikas are so because they follow extreme paths, not the Buddhist middle way, a concept with metaphysical and soteriological implications. Thus, a key aspect of the tīrthika is that they are people who hold false views (Pali diṭṭhi, Sanskrit dṛṣṭi), such as the view of an unchanging self (ātman). The term tīrthika means "forder", indicating that they are people seeking a way to cross the stream (of samsara to nirvana).

Buddhist and Taoist monks in medieval China often called each other "heretics" and competed to be praised by the royal court. Although today most Chinese believe in a hybrid of the "Three Teachings" (Buddhism, Taoism, Confucianism) the competition between the two religions may still be seen in some teachings and commentaries given by both religions today. A similar situation happened with Shinto in Japan. Neo-Confucian heresy has also been described.

In classical Hinduism, "heresy" and "heterodoxy" are conceptualized primarily through the categories of āstika and nāstika, which distinguish schools by their acceptance or rejection of specific authoritative principles (usually based on sacred scripture) rather than by adherence to a centralized creed. The decisive criterion in most traditions is acknowledgment of the Vedas as a valid revelatory source (śabda-pramāṇa) and, in many formulations, acceptance of a permanent self (ātman) and of karmic retribution. Systems such as Nyāya, Vaiśeṣika, Sāṅkhya, Yoga, Mīmāṃsā, and Vedānta are classified as āstika because they recognize Vedic authority, even while differing extensively in metaphysics and soteriology. Traditions such as Buddhism, Jainism, and Cārvāka are labeled nāstika, not in the sense of moral deviance but in the sense of methodologically rejecting Vedic revelation and certain associated doctrinal commitments. Because Hindu traditions lack a central ecclesiastical institution, these classifications are analytical rather than juridical; they function to delineate epistemic and ritual boundaries rather than to designate punishments.

The act of using Church of Scientology techniques in a form different from that originally described by L. Ron Hubbard is referred to within Scientology as "squirreling" and is said by Scientologists to be high treason. The Religious Technology Center has prosecuted breakaway groups who have practiced Scientology outside the official Church without authorization.

Although Zoroastrianism has had an historical tolerance for other religions, it also held sects like Zurvanism and Mazdakism heretical to its main dogma and has violently persecuted them, such as burying Mazdakians with their feet upright as "human gardens." In later periods Zoroastrians cooperated with Muslims to kill other Zoroastrians deemed heretical.

== Non-religious usage ==
In other contexts the term does not necessarily have pejorative overtones and may even be complimentary when used, in areas where innovation is welcome, of ideas that are in fundamental disagreement with the status quo in any practice and branch of knowledge.

Scientist/author Isaac Asimov considered heresy as an abstraction, mentioning religious, political, socioeconomic and scientific heresies. He divided scientific heretics into: endoheretics, those from within the scientific community; and exoheretics, those from without. Characteristics were ascribed to both and examples of both kinds were offered. Asimov concluded that science orthodoxy defends itself well against endoheretics (by control of science education, grants and publication as examples), but is nearly powerless against exoheretics. He acknowledged by examples that heresy has repeatedly become orthodoxy.

Publishing his findings as The Dinosaur Heresies, revisionist paleontologist Robert T. Bakker, himself a scientific endoheretic, treated the mainstream view of dinosaurs as dogma:

I have enormous respect for dinosaur paleontologists past and present. But on average, for the last fifty years, the field hasn't tested dinosaur orthodoxy severely enough.

He adds that, "Most taxonomists, however, have viewed such new terminology as dangerously destabilizing to the traditional and well-known scheme." The illustrations by the author show dinosaurs in very active poses, in contrast to the traditional perception of lethargy.

Immanuel Velikovsky is an example of a recent scientific exoheretic; he did not have appropriate scientific credentials and did not publish in scientific journals. While the details of his work are in scientific disrepute, the concept of catastrophic change (extinction event and punctuated equilibrium) has gained acceptance in recent decades.

The term heresy is used not only with regard to religion but also in the context of political theory. The term heresy is also used as an ideological pigeonhole for contemporary writers because, by definition, heresy depends on contrasts with an established orthodoxy. For example, the tongue-in-cheek contemporary usage of heresy, such as to categorize a "Wall Street heresy" a "Democratic heresy" or a "Republican heresy", are metaphors that invariably retain a subtext that links orthodoxies in geology or biology or any other field to religion. These expanded metaphoric senses allude to both the difference between the person's views and the mainstream and the boldness of such a person in propounding these views.

== See also ==
- Blasphemy
- Cancel culture
- Convention (norm)
- Deviationism
- Herem
- Heterodoxy
- Mores
- Norm (social)
- Prohairesis
- Religious offense
- Sacrilege
- Schism
- Sin
- Zandaqa
- Middle ground
- Extremism

== Bibliography ==
- Walter Bauer (1971), Orthodoxy and Heresy in Earliest Christianity, (Philadelphia, Fortress Press (original edition 1934) ISBN 0-8006-1363-5 (on-line: Updated Electronic English Edition by Robert A. Kraft, 1993).
- Henderson, John B. (1998). The Construction of Orthodoxy and Heresy: Neo-Confucian, Islamic, Jewish, and Early Christian Patterns. Albany, NY: State University of New York Press. ISBN 978-0-7914-3759-9.
- Alain Le Boulluec (1985), La notion d'hérésie dans la littérature grecque, 2 voll., Paris, Etudes Augustiniennes, (The Notion of Heresy in Greek Literature in the Second and Third Centuries, New York, Oxford University Press, 2022)
