= Alain Le Boulluec =

French contemporary patristics scholar

Alain Le Boulluec (born 1941) is a contemporary French patristics scholar working mainly in the sphere of Clement of Alexandria and of Origen of Alexandria.

Le Boulluec is the Director Emeritus of Studies of the École pratique des hautes études in Paris, part of the University of Paris. His studies have also focused on heresy and on the Neo-Chalcedonian movement which developed in theology during the reign of the Emperor Justinian (527-565 AD).

Among his publications Le Boulluec has edited Clément d'Alexandrie, Stromates V and VII in the Sources Chrétiennes collection (nos.278,279,428). He is also a contributor to the la Bible d'Alexandrie, a translation of the Septuagint.

== Works ==
- Histoire de la littérature grecque, PUF, "Quadrige", 2010
- A. Le Boulluec (dir.), A la recherche des villes saintes, Turnhout, Brepols, 2004., 2007
- A. Le Boulluec, E. Patlagean (dir.), Les retours aux Ecritures. Fondamentalismes présents et passés, Leuven, Peeters, 1993, 2007
- Clément d'Alexandrie, Stromate V, Introduction, texte critique, commentaire, par A. Le Boulluec, S. C. 278–279, Paris,1981, 2007
- Clément d'Alexandrie, Stromate VII, Intr., Texte critique, Trad. et notes par A. Le Boulluec, SC 428, Paris, 1997., 2007
- L'Exode, Trad. du texte grec de la Septante, introd. et notes par A. Le Boulluec et P. Sandevoir, BA 2, Paris, 1989., 2007
- Origène, Traité des principes, traduction par M. Harl, G. Dorival, A. Le Boulliuec, Paris, Etudes Augustiniennes, 1976, 2007
- Roman pseudo-clémentin. Homélies, dans Écrits apocryphes chrétiens, Paris, Gallimard, 2005 ( trad. des Hom. 3, 5–7, 16–20)., 2007
- S. Saïd, M. Trédé, A. Le Boulluec, Histoire de la littérature grecque, Paris, PUF, 1997 ("La littérature grecque chrétienne"), 2007 (Traduction grecque du précédent, Athènes, 2004, 2007)
- La notion d'hérésie dans la littérature grecque, 2 voll., Paris, Etudes Augustiniennes, 1985 (The Notion of Heresy in Greek Literature in the Second and Third Centuries, New York, Oxford University Press, 2022)
