= Jean-Marc Ferry =

French philosopher

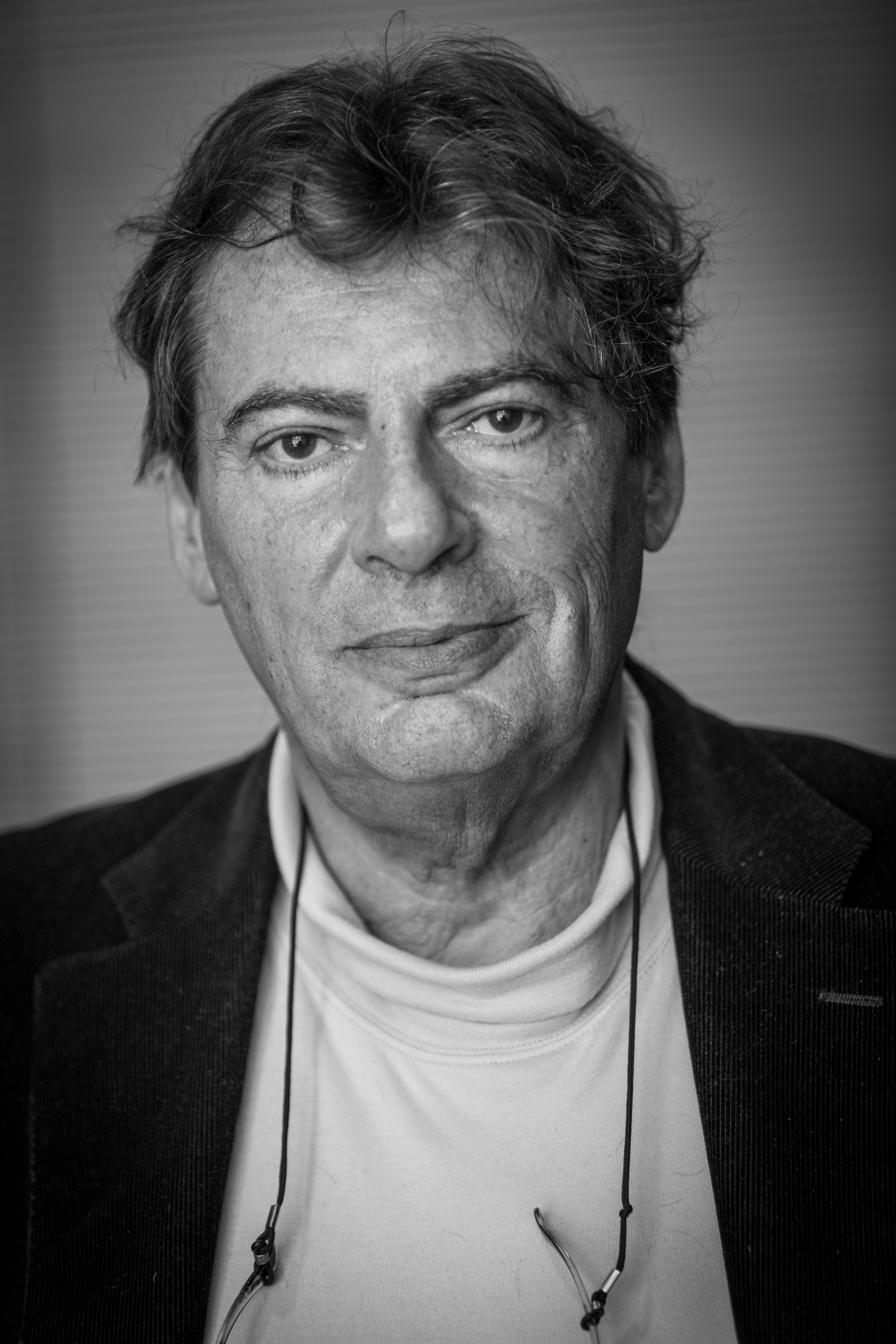
Jean-Marc Ferry by Claude Truong-Ngoc, 2014.

Jean-Marc Ferry (French: [fɛʁi]; born 5 May 1946, Antony, Hauts-de-Seine) is a French philosopher who is best known for his book Les puissances de l'expérience (1991), described by Paul Ricoeur as "one of the most important works recently published in the field of social and political philosophy". He has also translated the work of Jürgen Habermas, by whom he was influenced, into French.

== Work ==
=== Construction of identity ===
According to Ferry, the forms of discourse through which identity is constructed are narration, interpretation, argumentation, and reconstruction. P. Smith summarizes Ferry as follows,

Historical and discursive progress from narration toward reconstruction is associated with increasing reflexivity about identity and the grounds upon which it is established. Narration, in Ferry’s view, consists of ossified traditional myths which define identities in a more or less prescriptive, taken-forgranted way. Interpretation, on the other hand, involves the assimilation of identity to universal categories like law and justice and is exemplified in early Christian and ancient Greek thought. Argumentation opens up claims of identity to rational dialogue as embodied, for example, in the Enlightenment. Reconstruction, the final step toward reflexivity, involves hermeneutic attempts to understand the historical grounds behind the "good reasons" offered by others in argumentation. This is in part a logical and ethical consequence of the shift from it to you (acknowledging subjectivity) which emerges with argumentation itself.

=== Postnational identity and Europe ===
Ferry also discusses what he considers to be the building of postnational identity in Europe, a way to think of the European Union as a medium to separate national identity and political identity. The former and the latter are unified in the classical Nation-State, but separated by the process of the building of a new Europe, whose ultimate political identity is not the Nation-State but a Political Community which, according to Ferry, is not a Federal State nor a State in general but an absolutely other form of political construction. This new construction derives from the experience of World Wars I & II, which, Ferry believes, forced the European people to organize their inter-relationship beyond classical models of sovereignty and warfare.

=== Spinelli Group ===
On 15 September 2010, Ferry supported the new initiative Spinelli Group in the European Parliament, which was founded to reinvigorate the strive for federalisation of the European Union (EU). Other prominent supporters of the initiative are Jacques Delors, Daniel Cohn-Bendit, Guy Verhofstadt, Andrew Duff, and Elmar Brok.

== Bibliography ==
- Les Puissances de l'expérience, Tome I, Le sujet et le verbe, Cerf, Paris, 1991, ISBN 2-204-04371-0
- La Raison et la foi, Pocket, Paris, 2016, ISBN 978-2-266-27009-0
- Stephan Meyer: Jürgen Habermas interviewed by Jean-Marc Ferry: The limits of neo-historicism. Philosophy & Social Criticism. 1996;22(3):1-8.
