= Claude Geffré =

French Roman Catholic theologian

- Born: 23 January 1926; Niort, France
- Died: 9 February 2017 (aged 91); Paris, France
- Education: Pontifical University of Saint Thomas Aquinas
- Occupation: Theologian

Claude Geffré (23 January 1926 – 9 February 2017) was a French Roman Catholic theologian. He became a Professor of Theology at the Institut Catholique de Paris in 1965, and he was the director of the École Biblique in Jerusalem from 1996 to 1999. He was an expert on Biblical hermeneutics and pluralism, and the author of several books.

== Early life ==
Claude Geffré was born on 23 January 1926 in Niort, Western France. He earned a doctorate in theology from the Pontifical University of Saint Thomas Aquinas.

== Career ==
Geffré started his teaching career at Saulchoir. In 1965, he became a professor of theology at the Institut Catholique de Paris. He served as the director of the École Biblique in Jerusalem from 1996 to 1999.

Geffré was an expert in Biblical hermeneutics and pluralism. In 1977, he was the co-founder of the Groupe de recherches islamo-chrétien (GRIC), a research centre for Christian-Muslim Studies. He was the author of several books about Christianity. Some of his books, like Le christianisme comme religion de l'Evangile, were dismissed as "relativistic" by some critics.

Geffré became a Knight of the Legion of Honour in 1998.

== Death ==
Geffré died on 9 February 2017 in Paris, at the age of 91. His funeral was held at the Couvent des Jacobins de la rue Saint-Jacques on 13 February 2017 and he was buried in Étiolles, Essonne, France.

== Works ==
- Greffré, Claude (1970). Un espace pour Dieu. Paris: Editions du Cerf. OCLC 13855891.
- Greffré, Claude (1972). Un nouvel âge de la théologie. Paris: Editions du Cerf. OCLC 299892031.
- Greffré, Claude (1983). Le christianisme au risque de l'interprétation. Paris: Editions du Cerf. ISBN 9782204020145. OCLC 14359368.
- Greffré, Claude (1991). Passion de l'homme, passion de Dieu. Paris: Editions du Cerf. ISBN 9782204042987. OCLC 26552275.
- Geffré, Claude; Jarczyk, Gwendoline (1999). Profession théologien : quelle pensée chrétienne pour le XXIe siècle? : entretiens avec Gwendoline Jarczyk. Paris: Albin Michel. ISBN 9782226109835. OCLC 300693277.
- Greffré, Claude (2001). Croire et interpréter : le tournant herméneutique de la théologie. Paris: Editions du Cerf. ISBN 9782204066297. OCLC 300469791.
- Debray, Régis; Geffré, Claude; Vinson, Éric (2006). Avec ou sans Dieu? : le philosophe et le théologien. Paris: Bayard. ISBN 9782227475670. OCLC 300526494.
- Greffré, Claude (2006). De Babel à Pentecôte : essais de théologie interreligieuse. Paris: Editions du Cerf. ISBN 9782204080279. OCLC 64303574.
- Greffré, Claude (2012). Le christianisme comme religion de l'Evangile. Paris: Éditions du Cerf. ISBN 9782204098373. OCLC 816721773.
