= Louis Doutreleau =

French Jesuit (1909–2005)

Louis Doutreleau, SJ (1909-2005) was a French Jesuit priest closely associated over a long period with the publishing enterprise of the Sources Chrétiennes Institute in Lyons. He edited volumes of the works of Irenaeus, Origen, Didymus the Blind and of John Chrysostom. Together with Georges-Mathieu de Durand he also edited Basil of Caesarea's Against Eunomius.

== Works ==
- Didyme l'Aveugle Sur Zacharie: Texte inédit d'après un papyrus de Toura, 3 vols. (Sources Chrétiennes, 83—85), 1963
- Mosäiques: Anthologie de Sources Chrétiennes, 2 vols., Paris 1993
- Origéne: Homélies sur les Nombres. I. Homélies I-X (Sources Chrétiennes, 415), 1996
