= Henri Burin des Roziers =

Henri Burin des Roziers, O.P. (February 18, 1930 – November 26, 2017), was a French Dominican Order priest and lawyer, who spent forty years working with and defending Brazilian peasants forced into labor or harassed by wealthy landowners. Landowners repeatedly threatened his life in an attempt to stop this work. In Brazil, he was known as "counsel for the landless".

== Early life and work ==
Born February 18, 1930, to an upper-middle-class family, Burin des Roziers obtained degrees in literature from the Sorbonne, comparative law from the University of Cambridge, and in 1957 a doctor of law at the Faculty of Law of Paris.

While at Cambridge Burin des Roziers met the Dominican Yves Congar, who had a profound influence on him. Burin des Roziers entered the Dominican order in 1958 and after ordination as a Dominican priest 1963, he worked as a chaplain with law and economics students in Paris. Burin des Roziers became close to and worked with the Dominican and worker-priest Jean Raguenès. In 1970 he began work as a social worker in Annecy (Hautes-Savoie), working particularly with Tunisian immigrants.

== Work in Brazil ==
In 1978, Burin des Roziers left for Brazil, where he became a lawyer for the landless people who lived at the edge of the Amazon rainforest.

Burin des Roziers was instrumental in helping more than 50,000 people who worked in forced labor for wealthy landowners who controlled the majority of rural lands. In 2000, as a lawyer for the Pastoral Commission of the Earth in the State of Pará, Burin des Roziers received death threats from a fazendeiro, one of the wealthy hacienda owners (latifundists), who was also responsible for the assassination of a union leader.

In 2005, after the assassination of the American missionary Dorothy Stang, Burin des Roziers was again threatened with death, as were many trade unionists and religious advocates who worked with the poor. A contract was placed against him by the fazendeiros, for 50,000 reals or 20,000 euros.

== Honors ==
As a result of his works, Burin des Roziers received the Legion of Honor in 1994, and the Ludovic-Trarieux international human rights prize in 2005.

== Death ==
Burin des Roziers reluctantly left Brazil in 2014 after suffering three strokes and died from natural causes in Paris on November 26, 2017, at the convent of Paris Saint-Jacques.
