= First Apology of Justin Martyr =

Second-century Christian apologetic text by Justin Martyr

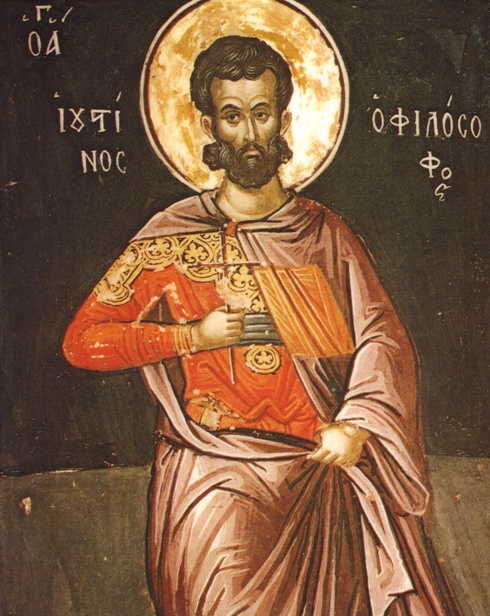
- Saint Justin Martyr by Theophanes the Cretan, painting c. 1545–1546.

Information
- Religion: Christianity
- Author: Justin Martyr
- Language: Greek
- Period: Early Christianity; AD 155–157

Full text
- First Apology of Justin Martyr at English Wikisource

The First Apology is an early work of Christian apologetics addressed by Justin Martyr to the Roman Emperor Antoninus Pius. In addition to arguing against the persecution of individuals solely for being Christian, Justin also provides the Emperor with a defense of the philosophy of Christianity and a detailed explanation of contemporary Christian practices and rituals. This work, along with the Second Apology, has been cited as one of the earliest examples of Christian apology, and many scholars attribute this work to creating a new genre of apology out of what was a typical Roman administrative procedure.

== Justin Martyr’s life and background ==
Justin Martyr was born in Flavia Neapolis (modern Nablus), a Greek-speaking town in Samaria within the Roman Empire. In the Dialogue with Trypho, Justin explains how he came to Christianity after previously passing through the schools of Stoicism, Peripateticism, and Pythagoreanism. After becoming interested in Platonism, Justin eventually converted to Christianity after an encounter with an old man, which Justin describes in the Dialogue as “a love of the prophets, and of those people who are friends of Christ [that] possessed me.” The equating of Christianity with philosophy is important for Justin, as it explains the importance of the Apologies in defending Christianity in philosophical terms.

The First Apology is dated to between AD 155–157, based on the reference to Lucius Munatius Felix as a recent prefect of Egypt. The theologian Robert Grant has claimed that this Apology was made in response to the martyrdom of Polycarp, which occurred around the same time as the Apology was written. This correlation would explain why the Apology heavily focused on punishment by fire; a reference to Polycarp’s burning at the stake. It is also generally believed that the Second Apology was originally part of the larger First Apology, although there is uncertainty among scholars about this point.

== Themes of the First Apology ==
=== Addressing criticisms of Christians ===
In the early chapters of the First Apology, Justin discusses the principal criticisms of contemporary Christians; namely, atheism, immorality, and disloyalty to the Empire. He first argues that “the name” of Christianity by itself is not reason enough to punish or persecute, and he urges the Empire instead to only punish evil actions, writing, “For from a name neither approval nor punishment could fairly come, unless something excellent or evil in action can be shown about it.” He then goes on to address the charges more directly, in which he argues that they are “atheists” toward Roman gods, but not to the “most true God.” He acknowledges that some Christians have performed immoral acts, but urges officials to punish these individuals as evildoers rather than Christians. With this claim, Justin demonstrates his desire to separate the Christian name from the evil acts performed by certain individuals, lamenting how criminals tarnish the name of Christianity and are not true “Christians.” Finally, he addresses the alleged disloyalty to the Empire, discussing how Christians do seek to be members of another kingdom, but this kingdom is “of that with God” rather than a “human one.”

=== Jesus Christ as the Logos ===
Justin goes to great lengths in the First Apology to defend Christianity as a rational philosophy. He remarks at how Christianity can provide moral teaching for its followers, and how many of the Christian teachings parallel similar stories in pagan mythology, making it irrational for contemporary pagans to persecute Christians.

One of Justin’s most important themes involves his description of the logos, a philosophical concept of order of reason and knowledge. Throughout the First Apology, Justin argues that Jesus Christ is the incarnation of the Logos, which leads him to the proof that any individual who has spoken with reason, even those who lived before Christ, connected with the logos in the form of Christ, and is thus, in fact, a Christian.

This theme is paramount to understanding Justin’s defense of Christianity, and was a groundbreaking statement in Christian apologetic writing. The use of the term “logos” indicates that Justin likely drew upon prior philosophical teachings, but Justin makes the argument that these teachings represent only partial truth because they possess and are connected with only part of the overall logos. For Justin, Christianity represents the full truth (logos), meaning that Christianity is not only a meaningful philosophy, but it also completes and corrects prior thought to achieve the highest level of knowledge and reason.

=== Early Church practices ===
The First Apology provides one of the most detailed accounts of contemporary Christian practice. Those who are baptized are "brought by us where there is water", where they are "born again in the same manner of rebirth by which we ourselves were born again". After the discussion of baptism, Justin describes the practice of the Eucharist: by his teachings of metabole, "we have been taught that the food over which thanks have been given by a word of prayer that is from Him, from which our blood and flesh are nourished by transformation, is the flesh and blood of Jesus who became incarnate". Finally, he provides information on the weekly Sunday meetings of the congregation, consisting of readings from the Jewish prophets and "the memoirs of the apostles", prayers, a collection for the poor, and a meal.

== Historical and literary significance ==
There has been significant scholarly debate about the extent to which Justin’s Apologies differed from prior and future apologetic discourse. Paul Parvis, a prominent Justin scholar from the University of Edinburgh, has noted that the First Apology is unlike any apology that preceded it. It presents itself as legal petition, a standard Roman administrative genre that seeks to change a legal precedent (in this case, asking Christians to be charged based on evil deeds rather than for being Christian in and of itself). But by including the descriptions of Christian practice and belief, Parvis argues that “[w]hat Justin did was to hijack this normal Roman administrative procedure and turn it into a vehicle for articulating and disseminating the message of the Gospel.” Sara Parvis, also from Edinburgh, further argues that scholars should do away with the classic conception of Christian apology as a “vague group of writings offering some kind of defense of Christianity,” and instead think of the category as one that was actually invented by Justin Martyr and then refined by later authors like Tertullian.

Scholars also note the importance of explaining Christian practice in defending the community as a whole. Robert Grant has noted that Justin did not provide much detail into the theological reasoning behind early Church practices. Instead, he argues that Justin aimed to provide this information to both “put forth the real nature of Christian life” and refute the slanderous claims of pagan critics.

== See also ==
- Justin Martyr
- Second Apology of Justin Martyr
