= Second Apology of Justin Martyr =

Second-century Christian apologetic text by Justin Martyr

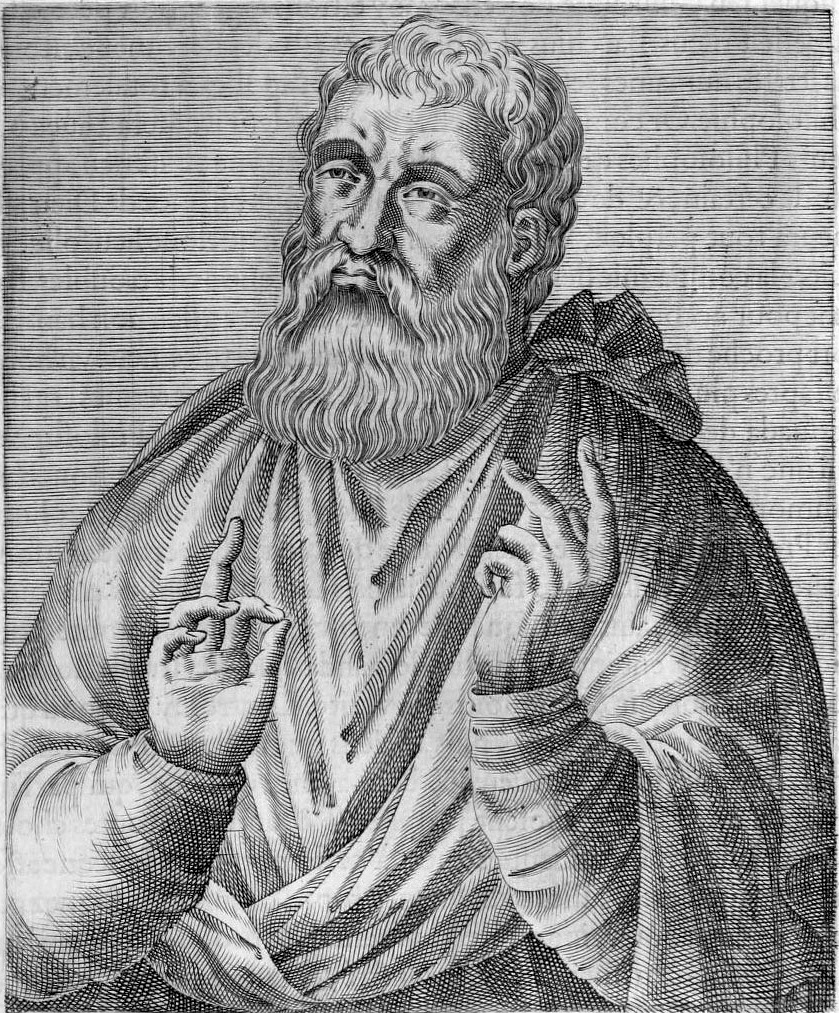
Justin Martyr

The Second Apology is an extant work of the early Christian apologist and philosopher Justin Martyr. It is supposed to have been written as a supplement to his First Apology, on account of certain proceedings which had in the meantime taken place in Rome before Lollius Urbicus as prefect of the city, which must have been between 150 and 157. The Apology is addressed to the Roman Senate. It survived in a single Greek manuscript of the year 1364, together with the First Apology and the Dialogue with Trypho.

== Purpose of the writing ==
The Second Apology was meant to expose the real reasons behind the recent persecutions of Christians under Urbicus. It also tried to expose the utter irrationality of allegations and propaganda spread against the Christians.

== Persecution of Christians under Urbicus ==
Justin recounts the story of a certain woman who on hearing the teachings of Jesus and having become a Christian refused to comply with the immoral practices of her husband. Because the disagreements were severe she desired to be divorced, but not being encouraged to do so, she continued in that relationship until one day when it became ethically unlivable, and she gave him a bill of divorce. The husband retaliated by bringing accusations against her before the Emperor. But when he couldn't do anything against her, he turned against the Christian leaders whom Urbicus the prefect began to severely persecute.

== Demonic Control of the World ==
According to Justin, it is the fallen angels and demons who incite such hatred and evil against the people of God – the ones who know the Son of God and have responded by faith to the Word of God. These demons are the spirits of those offspring born through union of fallen angels and women before the Flood and who were destroyed by the Flood. They control humans through magic arts, libations, and such intimidating systems that hold people in bondage. They are exorcised by the Christians from people in the Name of Jesus. All in whom the Word dwells have been hated – Heraclitus and Musonius, for example.

== Apology against Propaganda ==
The Christians were being accused of cannibalism and sexual immorality. Justin asks that if that was the case, and if Christians were pleasure-mongers, then why would they be fearless of death and faithful to what they believe. Their faithfulness to Christ in face of death proves that they are not pleasure seekers. On the contrary, it was the accusers who had a system of religion in which noble men sacrificed humans to gods such as Saturn and in which sexual immorality was openly practiced without shame. He cries out:

But would that even now some one would mount a lofty rostrum, and shout with a loud voice, "Be ashamed, be ashamed, ye who charge the guiltless with those deeds which yourselves openly commit, and ascribe things which apply to yourselves and to your gods to those who have not even the slightest sympathy with them. Be ye converted; become wise."

== Appeal ==
He portrays the Christians as those who love God and His Word (Jesus Christ). He desires that this appeal be published that the world will not be superstitious about Christians and closes with the words:

And our doctrines are not shameful, according to a sober judgment, but are indeed more lofty than all human philosophy; and if not so, they are at least unlike the doctrines of the Sotadists and Philaenidians, and Dancers, and Epicureans and such other teachings of the poets, which all are allowed to acquaint themselves with, both as acted and as written. And henceforth we shall be silent, having done as much as we could, and having added the prayer that all men everywhere may be counted worthy of the truth. And would that you also, in a manner becoming piety and philosophy, would for your own sakes judge justly!

== See also ==
- Justin Martyr
- First Apology of Justin Martyr
