= Étienne Nodet =

French Roman Catholic priest (1944–2024)

- Born: 30 November 1944; Bourg-en-Bresse, France
- Died: 4 February 2024 (aged 79); Convent of St. Stephen, Jerusalem
- Education: École polytechnique Lumière University Lyon 2 Catholic University of Lyon; Hebrew University of Jerusalem
- Occupation: Roman Catholic priest

Étienne Nodet (30 November 1944 – 4 February 2024) was a French Dominican Roman Catholic priest. From 1977 to 2024, he taught at the École Biblique in Jerusalem and specialized in the history of Christianity and Judaism in the 1st and 2nd Centuries as well as Josephus.

== Biography ==
Born in Bourg-en-Bresse on 30 November 1944, Nodet studied at the École polytechnique from 1964 to 1966 and obtained a master's in philosophy from Lumière University Lyon 2. He earned a master's in philosophy from the Catholic University of Lyon in 1974 and obtained a Bachelor of Arts in Talmud studies from the Hebrew University of Jerusalem in 1979.

From 1977 to 2024, Nodet taught the history of the intertestamental period at the École Biblique. He participated in the television series Corpus Christi alongside Gérard Mordillat and Jérôme Prieur from 1997 to 1998, broadcast on the Arte channel.

Nodet died in Jerusalem on 4 February 2024, at the age of 79.

== Publications ==
=== Works ===
- Essai sur les origines du judaïsme (1992)
- Les Antiquités juives, livres I à IX (1995)
- La Bible de Josèphe, I : Le Pentateuque (1996)
- Essai sur les origines du christianisme (1998)
- "Les dernières vingt-quatre heures de Jésus" (1999)
- Baptême et résurrection (1999)
- Flavius Josèphe : l'homme et l'historien (2000)
- Le Fils de Dieu. Procès de Jésus et évangiles (2002)
- Histoire de Jésus ? Nécessité et limites d'une enquête (2004)
- La Crise maccabéenne. Historiographie juive et traditions bibliques (2005)
- La Porte du ciel. Les Esséniens et Qumrân. Quelles origines ? Quelles postérités ? (2016)
- Les Romains, les Juifs, et Flavius Josèphe (2019)
- Les Samaritains (2022)

=== Collective works ===
- Naissance de la méthode critique (1992)
- Le Judaïsme à l'aube de l'ère chrétienne (1999)
- Le Judéo-christianisme dans tous ses états (2001)

== Distinctions ==
- Knight of the Ordre des Arts et des Lettres (2005)
