= Sources Chrétiennes =

Bilingual collection of patristic texts

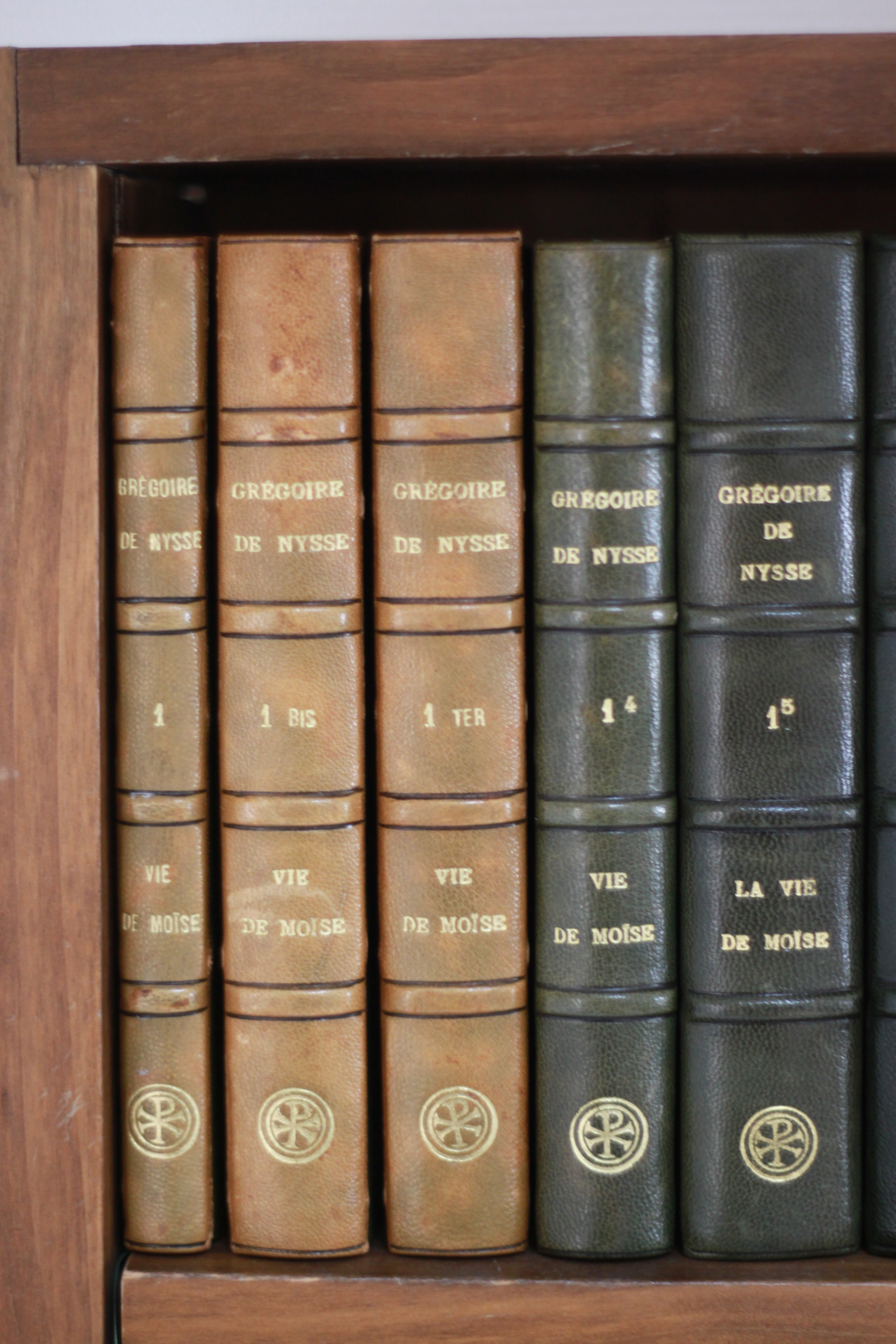
First editions of the Sources Chrétiennes in the library of the Institute in Lyon

Sources Chrétiennes (French "Christian sources") is a bilingual collection of patristic texts founded in Lyon in 1942 by the Jesuits Jean Daniélou, Claude Mondésert, and Henri de Lubac. Citations to the series are commonly made by the letters SC followed by the volume number.

== Overview ==
The collection is edited by the Institut des Sources Chrétiennes (current director: Guillaume Bady) and published in Paris by Les Éditions du Cerf. Each text is given on the left in Greek or Latin, with the French translation on the facing page.

Over 600 works by Greek, Latin and occasionally Syriac authors have been published. Other oriental Christian (e.g. Armenian) writers have been published only in translation. An early decision was made not to exclude subsequently condemned authors (such as Origen of Alexandria). Clement of Alexandria, the Cappadocians (Basil of Caesarea and Gregory of Nazianzus) John Chrysostom, Theodoret especially are strongly represented. Most Latin writers from Tertullian onwards are found, but a distinctive section is also devoted to later Western spiritual writers such as Bernard of Clairvaux. Augustine, given the dominant role of Etudes Augustiniennes, only appears twice (SC 75 & 116), thereby permitting a multiplicity of other patristic voices to be heard.

A parallel collection devoted to the works of Philo of Alexandria has also been developed.

The bilingual edition policy launched by Sources Chrétiennes has been followed by the German language series Fontes Christiani, published initially by Herder of Freiburg, Germany but now by Brepols of Turnhout, Belgium.

Many of the texts published bilingually by 'Sources Chrétiennes' have appeared recently in Italian translation.

Sources Chrétiennes is also in charge of the BIBLINDEX project , Index of Biblical Quotations and Allusions in Early Christian Literature.

A complete listing of the entire series' publications is provided online periodically.

== See also ==
- Louis Doutreleau
