= Joseph Mélèze-Modrzejewski =

Polish-French historian (1930–2017)

Joseph Mélèze-Modrzejewski (Józef Edmund Mélèze-Modrzejewski, 8 March 1930 in Lublin – 29 January 2017) was a Polish-French historian and professor of ancient history at the Pantheon-Sorbonne University.

== Career ==
Joseph Mélèze-Modrzejewski began his scientific career in Poland as a student of Rafał Taubenschlag. After his arrival in France in 1958, he taught for thirty years the legal and social history of the Hellenistic world at the Faculty of Law of Paris and at the Sorbonne. Following his retirement from the university in 1999, Mélèze-Modrzejewski continued for 5 years to lead a seminar on papyrology and history of rights from ancient times at the École pratique des hautes études (IV^{e} Section, historical and philological sciences) established in 1972.

From 1979 to 2010, Mélèze-Modrzejewski taught the history of post-Exilic Judaism at the Université libre de Bruxelles (Institute of Jewish Studies Martin Buber). His works — some 400 books, articles, minutes and chronicles since 1951 — focus on various aspects of the history of law and institutions of antiquity, especially the legal and social history of Greek and Roman Egypt in light of papyrological sources, as well as the history of Judaism during the Second Temple period. As the director of the Revue historique de droit français et étranger, he participated in the management of several international journals in the field of the history of law and institutions.

== Main publications ==
- Alexandre le Grand, Varsovie : Éditions Ksiazka i Wiedza, 1958; 2^{e} ed. 1961 [in Polish], and Tel Aviv, Éditions Heder, 1961 [in Hebrew].
- Droit impérial et traditions locales dans l’Égypte romaine, Aldershot : Éditions Variorum, 1990.
- Statut personnel et liens de famille dans les droits de l’Antiquité, Aldershot Éditions Variorum, 1993.
- Les Juifs d’Égypte, de Ramsès II à Hadrien, Paris : Éditions Errance, 1991, et Armand Colin, 1992; 2^{e} ed., revue et complétée, Paris : PUF, 1997 (Quadrige 247); The Jews of Egypt from Rameses II to Emperor Hadrian, Philadelphie et Jérusalem, The Jewish Publication Society, et Edimbourg, T&T Clark, 1995; 2^{e} ed., revue, Princeton, Princeton University Press, 1997.
- Troisième Livre des Maccabées, Translation of the Greek text of the Septante. Introduction and notes by Joseph Mélèze-Modrzejewski. (La Bible d’Alexandrie 15.3), Paris: Éditions du Cerf, 2008.

== See also ==
- History of the Jews in Egypt
- Marguerite Harl
