= La Bible d'Alexandrie =

Collection of new translations and commentaries of the Septuagint in French

La Bible d'Alexandrie is a collection of fresh translations and commentaries in French devoted to the Greek Septuagint. The first volume, devoted to Genesis, was edited by Marguerite Harl in 1986. Since then another eighteen volumes have appeared, and several others await publication. The series is edited by the French publishing house, Editions du Cerf.

In some respects the series responds to the earlier publication by the same publisher of the works of Philo of Alexandria.

The title strictly refers to the Pentateuch only, but has been extended to the whole of the Septuagint for the purposes of this edition, which is being prepared by a team of French scholars.

The editorial project was composed by 24 books of which there have been published at least the following 17 titles:

- La Genèse (1986, edited by Marguerite Harl and by Monique Alexandre, OCLC 63681697);
- Le Deutéronome (1992);
- Les Nombres (1994, OCLC 231979619)
- Jésus/Josué (1996);
- Premier Livre des Règnes (1997);
- Les Juges (1999);
- Proverbes (2000);
- L’Ecclésiaste (2002);
- Baruch, Lamentations, Lettre de Jérémie (2005, OCLC 553703404, ISBN 9782204077309);
- Ruth (2009);
- Troisième Livre des Maccabées (2008);
- Esdras II (2010)
- Esther (2012);
- Le Cantique des cantiques (2019);
- Les Douze Prophètes, split as follows:
  - a volume related to the prophets Joel, Obadiah, Jonah, Nahum, Habakkuk, Zephaniah (1999, ISBN 9782204062657);
  - a volume related to the prophet Osēe (2002, OCLC 249401560);
  - a volume related to the prophets Haggai and Zechariah (2007, ISBN 978-2204084406);
  - a volume related to the prophet Malachi (2011, ISBN 9782204094788, OCLC 756581089).

As of February 2021, the volume related to the prophets Amos and Micah has still to be published, amongst the unfinished others.

== Bibliography ==
- "La Bible d'Alexandrie - Version grecque des Septante" (in French). ISSN 2496-4441. OCLC 959975054. (FRBNF45116323)
