= Claude Mondésert =

French Jesuit (died 1990)

Claude Mondésert (?–1990) was a French Jesuit at Fourvière, Lyon and co-founder (with Jean Daniélou and Henri de Lubac) of the Sources Chrétiennes collection. He specialised in the work of the early Christian thinker, Clement of Alexandria, several volumes of which he edited or translated in this series.

He participated in a Colloquium held 1977 in Lyon concerning the persecution of Christians in Lugdunum in the year 177.
