= Patristics =

Study of the early Christian writers who are designated Church Fathers

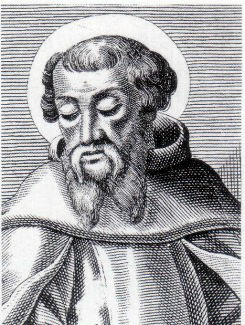
Irenaeus

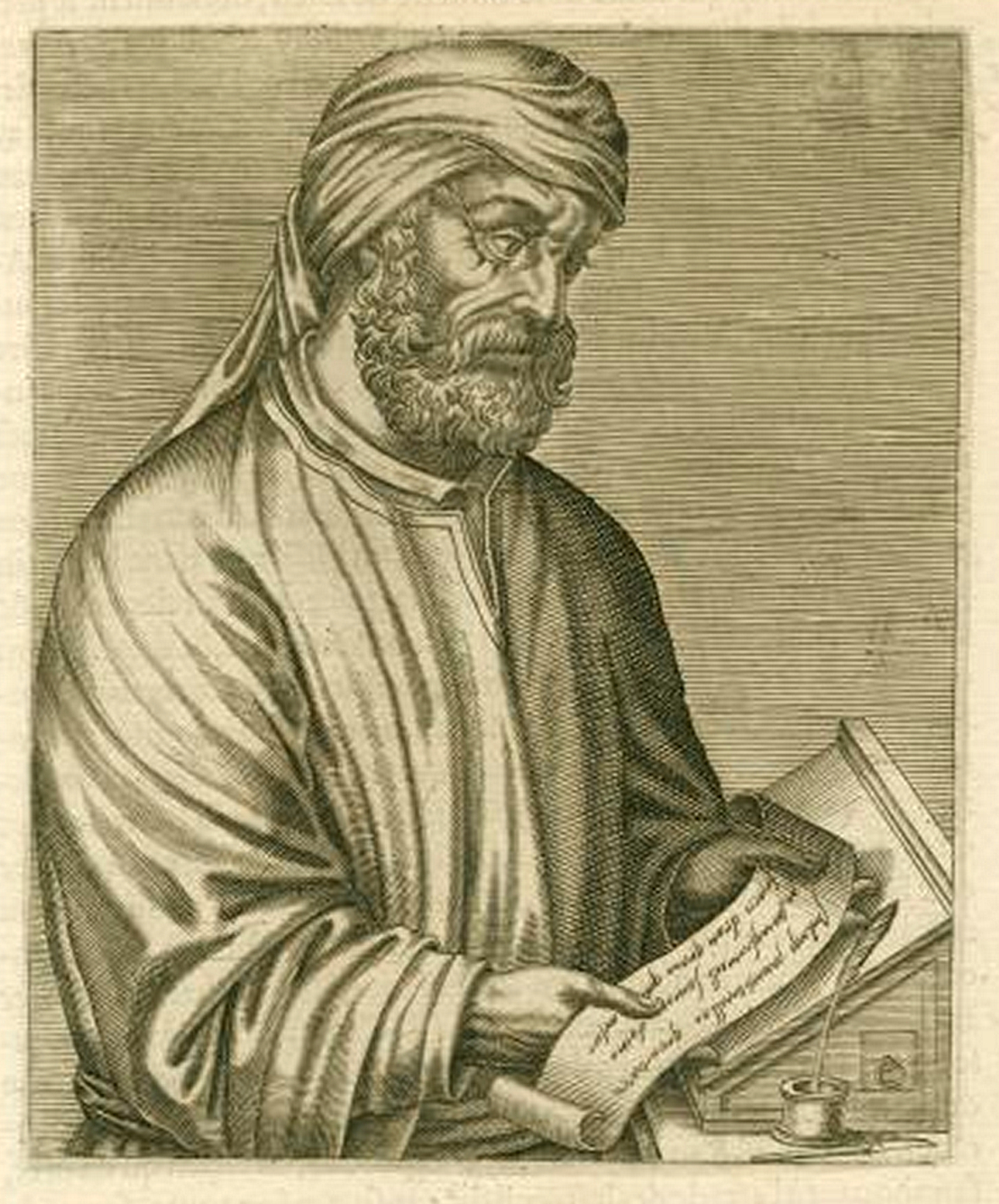
Tertullian

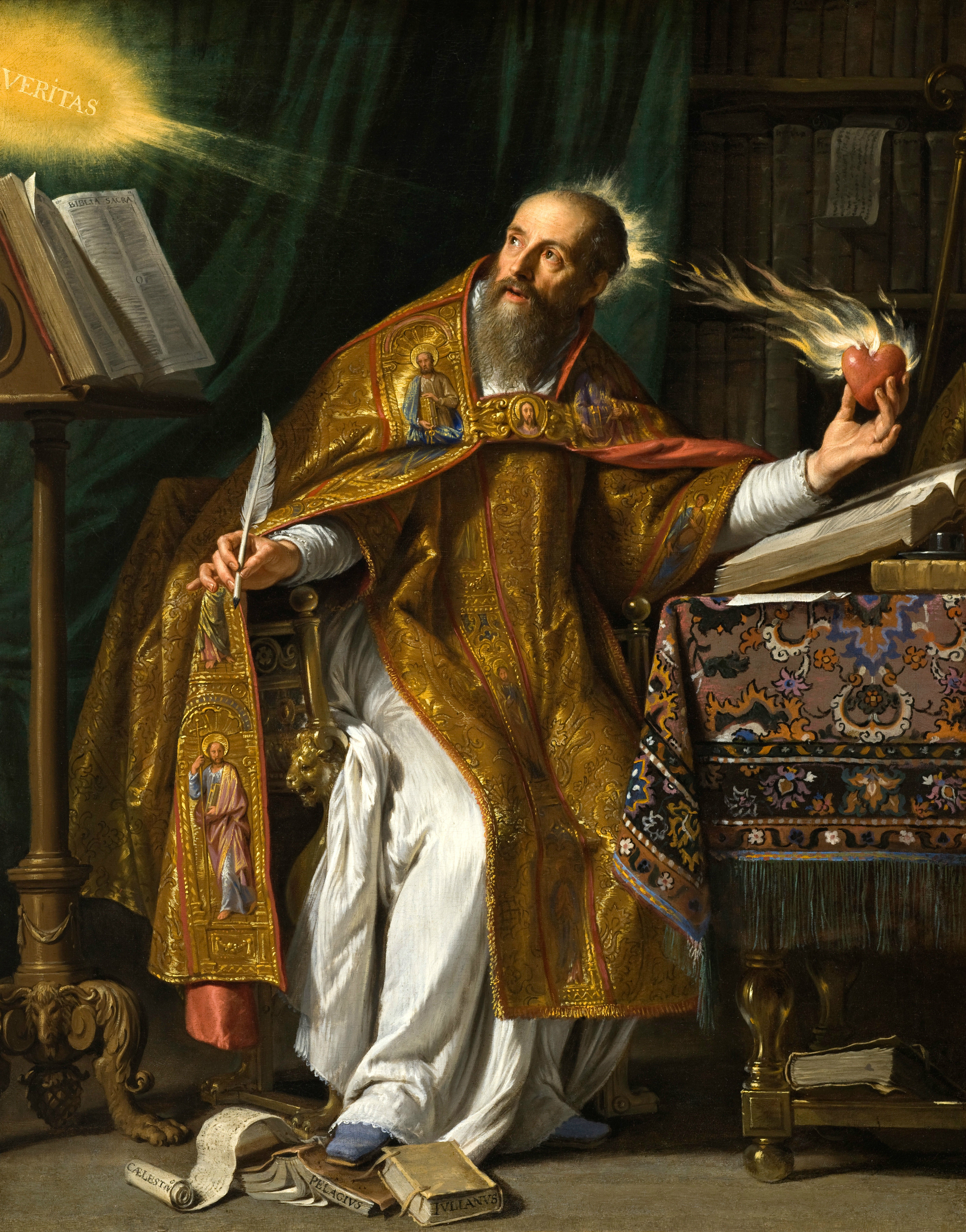
Augustine

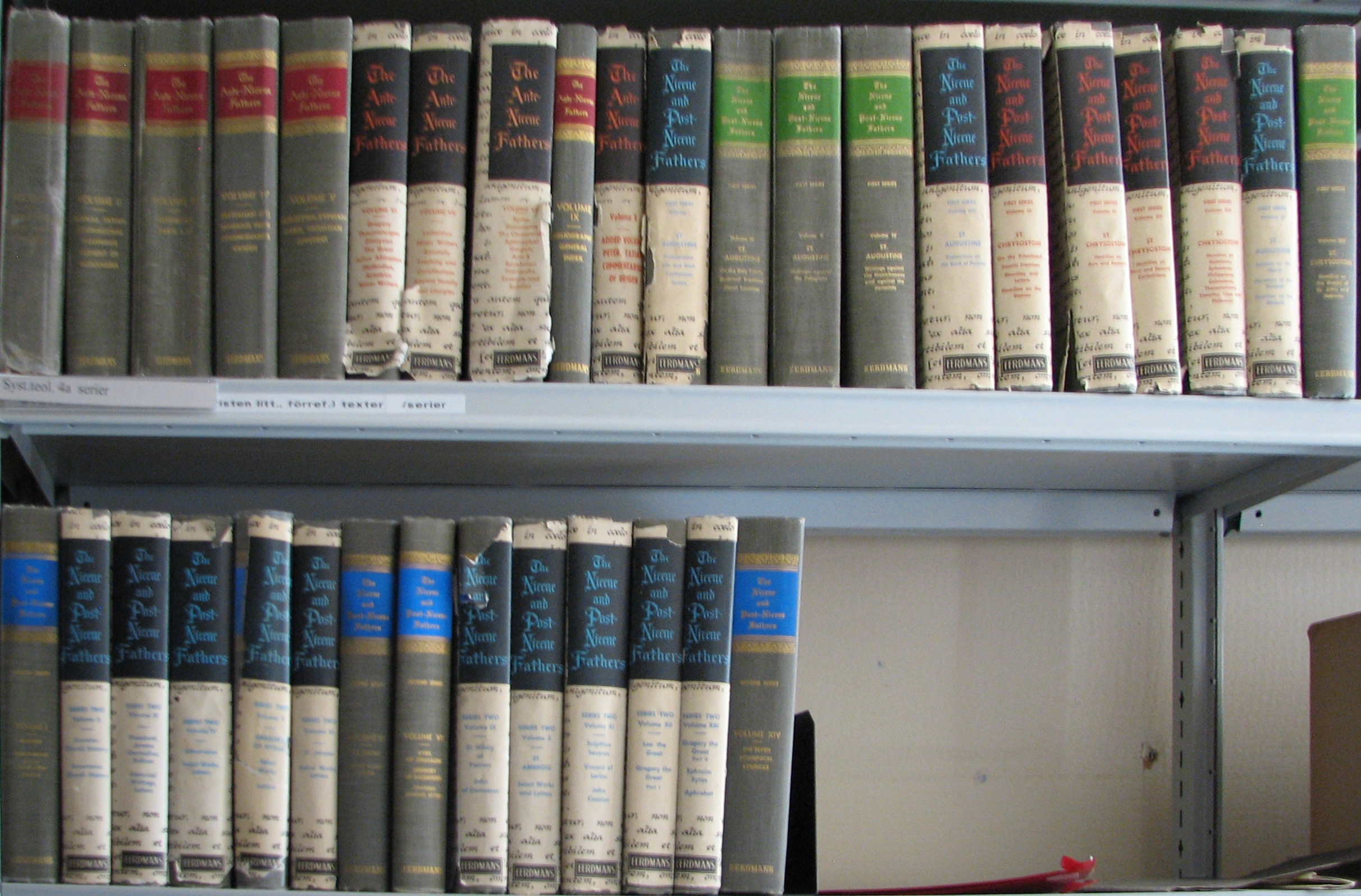
Volumes from Philip Schaff's The Nicene and Post-Nicene Fathers.

Patristics or patrology is the study of the early Christian writers who are designated Church Fathers. The names derive from the combined forms of Latin pater and Greek πᾰτήρ (father). The period of the Church Fathers, commonly called the Patristic era, is generally considered to run from the end of New Testament times or end of the Apostolic Age (c. AD 100) to either AD 451 (the date of the Council of Chalcedon) or to the Second Council of Nicaea in 787.

== Eras ==
The Church Fathers are generally divided into the Ante-Nicene Fathers, those who lived and wrote before the Council of Nicaea (325) and the Nicene and Post-Nicene Fathers, those who lived and wrote after 325. Also, the division of the Fathers into Greek and Latin writers is also common. Some of the most prominent Greek Fathers are Justin Martyr, Athanasius of Alexandria, Basil of Caesarea, Gregory of Nazianzus, John Chrysostom, Cyril of Alexandria, and Maximus the Confessor. Among the Latin Fathers are Tertullian, Cyprian, Jerome, Ambrose of Milan, Augustine of Hippo, and Gregory the Great.

There were also Church Fathers who wrote in languages other than Greek or Latin, such as Coptic, Syriac, Ge'ez, and Armenian, among others. (Note: Alopen, a key patristic-era figure in the Church Of The East, wrote in Chinese.) Historically, Chalcedonian Christians have had less interest in these authors since the associated churches ended up rejecting the councils of Chalcedon (becoming Oriental Orthodox), or Ephesus (becoming the Church of the East). Recently this has begun to change, with the easing of tensions between these branches of Christianity and the Western and Byzantine ones. There are Eastern Catholics who follow Oriental rites while remaining in communion with Rome.

== Locations ==
The major locations of the early Church fathers were Rome, Constantinople, Alexandria, Antioch, and the area of western north Africa around Carthage. Milan and Jerusalem were also sites.

== Key theological developments ==
Major focuses for these theologians during the period are, in chronological order, Christianity's relationship with Judaism; the establishment of the New Testament canon; apologetics (the 'defense' or 'explanation' of Christianity); and doctrinal discussions that sought to achieve consistency of faith, in particular within the Christianised Roman Empire. Following the scholar of Christianity Alister McGrath (1998), several major areas of theology can be seen to have developed during the Patristic Period: the extent of the New Testament canon, the role of tradition, the fixing of the ecumenical creeds, the two natures of Christ, the doctrine of the Trinity, the doctrine of the Church, and the doctrine of divine grace.

== Key persons ==
- Clement of Rome (c. 35 – c. 101) (Greek)
- Ignatius of Antioch (c. 35 – c. 108) (Greek)
- Aristides the Athenian (d. ~140) (Greek)
- Polycarp of Smyrna (c. 69 – c. 155) (Greek)
- Justin Martyr (c. 100 – c. 165) (Greek)
- Tatian the Assyrian (c. 120 – c. 180) (Greek)
- Melito of Sardis (d. 180) (Greek)
- Theophilus of Antioch (d. 184) (Greek)
- Athenagoras (c. 133 – c. 190) (Greek)
- Irenaeus of Lyons (c. 120 – c. 202) (Greek)
- Clement of Alexandria (c. 150 – c. 215) (Greek)
- Tertullian (c. 160 – c. 225) (Latin-African)
- Hippolytus of Rome (c. 170 – c. 235) (Greek)
- Julius Africanus (c. 160 – c. 240) (Greek-African)
- Origen (c. 185 – c. 254) (Greek)
- Marcus Minucius Felix (d. ~250) (Latin)
- Cyprian of Carthage (d. 258) (Latin-African)
- Pontius of Carthage (d. 259) (Latin-African)
- Dionysius of Alexandria (d. 264) (Greek)
- Dionysius of Rome (c. 200 – c. 268) (Greek)
- Gregory Thaumaturgus (c. 213 – c. 270) (Greek)
- Anatolius of Laodicea (d. 283) (Greek)
- Victorinus of Pettau (d. 304) (Greek)
- Pamphilus of Caesarea (d. 309) (Greek)
- Methodius of Olympus (died c. 311) (Greek)
- Lactantius (c. 250 – c. 325) (Latin-African)
- Alexander of Alexandria (d. 328) (Greek)
- Arnobius of Sicca (d. 330) (Latin-African)
- Eusebius of Caesarea (c. 260 – c. 340) (Greek)
- Eusebius of Nicomedia (d. 342) (Greek)
- Aphrahat (c. 280 – c. 345) (Syriac)
- Pachomius the Great (c. 292 – c. 348) (Coptic)
- Anthony the Great (c. 251 – c. 356) (Coptic)
- Hosius of Corduba (c. 256 – c. 357) (Latin)
- Eusebius of Emesa (c. 300 – c. 360) (Greek)
- Eustathius of Antioch (d. 360) (Greek)
- Potamius (d. 360) (Latin)
- Hilary of Poitiers (c. 310 – c. 368) (Latin)
- Eusebius of Vercelli (c. 283 – c. 371) (Latin)
- Lucifer of Cagliari (d. 371) (Latin)
- Athanasius (c. 296 – c. 373) (Greek-Coptic)
- Ephrem the Syrian (c. 306 – c. 373) (Syriac)
- Marcellus of Ancyra (d. 374) (Greek)
- Basil of Caesarea (c. 330 – 379) (Greek)
- Zeno of Verona (c. 300 – c. 380) (Latin-African)
- Apollinaris of Laodicea (d. 382) (Greek)
- Ambrosiaster (d. 384) (Latin)
- Cyril of Jerusalem (c. 313 – c. 386) (Greek)
- Gregory of Nazianzus (c. 329 – c. 389) (Greek)
- Ticonius (d. 390) (Latin-African)
- Nemesius (d. 390) (Greek)
- Diodorus of Tarsus (d. 390) (Greek)
- Pacian (c. 310 – c. 391) (Latin)
- Gregory of Elvira (d. 392) (Latin)
- Phoebadius of Agen (d. 392) (Latin)
- Gregory of Nyssa (c. 330 – c. 395) (Greek)
- Martin of Tours (c. 313 – c. 397) (Latin)
- Ambrose of Milan (c. 340 – c. 397) (Latin)
- Didymus the Blind (c. 313 – c. 398) (Greek)
- Siricius (c. 334 – c. 399) (Latin)
- Evagrius Ponticus (c. 345 – c. 399) (Greek)
- Gaius Marius Victorinus (d. 400) (Latin-African)
- Optatus (d. 400) (Latin-African)
- Publilius (d. 400) (Latin-African)
- Rufinus the Syrian (d. 401) (Latin)
- Anastasius I (d. 401) (Latin)
- Epiphanius of Salamis (c. 310 – c. 403) (Greek)
- Amphilochius of Iconium (d. 403) (Greek)
- John Chrysostom (c. 347 – c. 407) (Greek)
- Chromatius (d. 407) (Latin)
- Gaudentius of Brescia (d. 410) (Latin)
- Therasia of Nola (wife) (d. 410) (Latin)
- Macarius Magnes (d. ~410) (Greek)
- Tyrannius Rufinus (c. 345 – c. 411) (Latin)
- Theophilus of Alexandria (d. 412) (Greek)
- Prudentius (c. 348 – c. 413) (Latin)
- Nicetas of Remesiana (c. 335 – c. 414) (Latin)
- Synesius (c. 373 – c. 414) (Greek-African)
- John II of Jerusalem (d. 417) (Greek)
- Sulpicius Severus (c. 360 – c. 420) (Latin)
- Maruthas (d. 420) (Syriac)
- Martianus Capella (d. 420) (Latin-African)
- Paulinus the Deacon (d. ~422) (Latin)
- Severian of Gabala (c. 380 – c. 425) (Greek)
- Atticus of Constantinople (d. 425) (Greek)
- Jerome (c. 347 – c. 430) (Latin)
- Augustine of Hippo (c. 354 – c. 430) (Latin-African)
- Palladius of Galatia (c. 363 – c. 430) (Greek)
- Nilus of Sinai (d. 430) (Greek)
- Paulinus of Nola (husband) (c. 354 – c. 431) (Latin)
- Philip of Side (c. 380 – c. 431) (Greek)
- John Cassian (c. 360 – c. 435) (Latin)
- Rabbula (d. 435) (Syriac)
- Possidius (d. 437) (Latin-African)
- Isaac of Armenia (c. 354 – c. 439) (Armenian)
- Philostorgius (c. 368 – c. 439) (Greek)
- Socrates Scholasticus (c. 380 – c. 439) (Greek)
- Honoratus Antoninus (d. 440) (Latin-African)
- Flavius Lucius Dexter (c. 368 – c. 444) (Latin)
- Cyril of Alexandria (c. 376 – c. 444) (Greek)
- Eucherius of Lyon (c. 380 – c. 449) (Latin)
- Hilary of Arles (c. 403 – c. 449) (Latin)
- Poemen (c. 340 – c. 450) (Greek)
- Peter Chrysologus (c. 380 – c. 450) (Latin)
- Eznik of Kolb (c. 380 – c. 450) (Armenian)
- Sozomen (c. 400 – c. 450) (Greek)
- Agathangelos (d. ~450) (Armenian)
- Quodvultdeus (d. 450) (Latin-African)
- Vincent of Lérins (d. 450) (Latin)
- Isidore of Pelusium (d. 450) (Greek)
- Marius Mercator (c. 390 – c. 451) (Latin-African)
- Salvian (c. 405 – c. 451) (Latin)
- Prosper of Aquitaine (c. 390 – c. 455) (Latin)
- Simeon Stylites (c. 390 – c. 459) (Syriac)
- Isaac of Antioch (d. 460) (Syriac)
- Arnobius the Younger (d. 460) (Latín-African)
- Patrick (c. 385 – c. 461) (Latin)
- Leo the Great (c. 400 – c. 461) (Latin)
- Shenoute (c. 348 – c. 466) (Coptic)
- Theodoret (c. 393 – c. 466) (Greek)
- Gennadius of Constantinople (d. 471) (Greek)
- Elishe (c. 410 – c. 475) (Armenian)
- Timothy Ælurus (d. 477) (Greek)
- Iakob Tsurtaveli (d. ~483) (Georgian)
- Victor Vitensis (c. 430 – c. 484) (Latin-African)
- Vigilius of Thapsus (d. 484) (Latin-African)
- Diadochos of Photiki (c. 400 – c. 486) (Greek)
- Movses Khorenatsi (c. 410 – c. 490) (Armenian)
- Sidonius Apollinaris (c. 430 – c. 490) (Latin)
- Auspicius of Toul (d. 490) (Latin)
- Isaiah the Solitary (d. 491) (Greek)
- Gelasius I (d. 496) (Latin-African)
- Gennadius of Massilia (d. 496) (Latin)
- Pseudo-Dionysius the Areopagite (c. 400 – c. 500) (Greek)
- Nonnus (d. 500) (Greek)
- Antipater of Bostra (d. 500) (Greek)
- Narsai (c. 399 – c. 502) (Syriac)
- Julianus Pomerius (d. 505) (Latin-African)
- Ghazar Parpetsi (c. 442 – c. 510) (Armenian)
- John Rufus (c. 450 – c. 518) (Greek)
- Aeneas of Gaza (d. 518) (Greek)
- Avitus of Vienne (c. 450 – c. 519) (Latin)
- Jacob of Serugh (c. 451 – c. 521) (Syriac)
- Magnus Ennodius (c. 474 – c. 521) (Latin)
- Philoxenus of Mabbug (d. 523) (Syriac)
- Boethius (c. 477 – c. 524) (Latin)
- Fulgentius (c. 467 – c. 533) (Latin-African)
- Eugippius (c. 460 – c. 535) (Latin)
- Zacharias Rhetor (c. 465 – c. 536) (Greek)
- Severus of Antioch (c. 465 – c. 538) (Greek)
- Caesarius of Arles (c. 470 – c. 542) (Latin)
- Benedict of Nursia (c. 480 – c. 547) (Latin)
- Fulgentius Ferrandus (d. 547) (Latin-African)
- Cosmas Indicopleustes (d. 550) (Greek)
- Primasius of Hadrumetum (d. 560) (Latin-African)
- Dorotheus of Gaza (c. 505 – c. 565) (Greek)
- John Philoponus (c. 490 – c. 570) (Greek)
- Gildas (c. 500 – c. 570) (Latin)
- Victor of Tunnuna (d. 570) (Latin-African)
- John Malalas (c. 491 – c. 578) (Greek)
- Martin of Braga (c. 520 – c. 580) (Latin)
- Peter III of Callinicum (c. 550 – c. 591) (Syriac)
- Gregory of Antioch (d. 593) (Greek)
- Evagrius Scholasticus (c. 536 – c. 594) (Greek)
- Gregory of Tours (c. 538 – c. 594) (Latin)
- John IV of Constantinople (d. 595) (Greek)
- David the Invincible (d. 600) (Armenian)
- Basil of Oxyrhynchus (d. 600) (Coptic)
- Leander of Seville (c. 534 – c. 601) (Latin)
- Gregory I (c. 540 – c. 604) (Latin)
- Eulogius of Alexandria (d. 608) (Greek)
- Venantius Fortunatus (c. 530 – c. 609) (Latin)
- Isidore of Seville (c. 560 – c. 626) (Latin)
- Gregory of Agrigento (c. 559 – c. 630) (Greek)
- Theophylact Simocatta (c. 580 – c. 630) (Greek)
- Andrew of Caesarea (c. 563 – c. 637) (Latin)
- Sophronius of Jerusalem (c. 560 – c. 638) (Greek)
- John Climacus (c. 579 – c. 649) (Greek)
- Maximus the Confessor (580–662) (Greek)
- Anania Shirakatsi (c. 610 – c. 685) (Armenian)
- Isaac of Nineveh (d. 700) (Syriac)
- Jacob of Edessa (c. 640 – c. 708) (Syriac)
- Bede the Venerable (d. 735) (Latin)
- John of Damascus (d. 749) (Greek)

== Obstacles to 21st-century understanding ==
Alister McGrath notes four reasons why understanding patristics can be difficult in the early 21st-century:

1. Some of the debates appear to have little relevance to the modern world
2. the use of classical philosophy
3. the doctrinal diversity
4. the divisions between East and West, i.e., Greek and Latin methods of theology, the extent of use of classical philosophy.

The terms neo-patristics and post-patristics refer to recent theologies according to which the Church Fathers must be reinterpreted or even critically tested in light of modern developments since their writings reflected that of a distant past. These theologies, however, are considered controversial or even dangerous by orthodox theologians.

== Patrology vs. patristics ==
Some scholars, chiefly in Germany, distinguish patrologia from patristica. Josef Fessler, for instance, defines patrologia as the science which provides all that is necessary for the using of the works of the Fathers, dealing, therefore, with their authority, the criteria for judging their genuineness, the difficulties to be met within them, and the rules for their use. But Fessler's own Institutiones Patrologiae has a larger range, as have similar works entitled Patrologies, for example, that of Otto Bardenhewer (tr. Shahan, Freiburg, 1908). Catholic writer Karl Keating argues that patrology is the study of the Early Fathers and their contemporaries as people, and the authenticity of the works attributed to them. Patristics, on the other hand, is the study of their thought.

On the other hand, Fessler describes patristica as that theological science by which all that concerns faith, morals, or discipline in the writings of the Fathers is collected and sorted. The lives and works of the Fathers are also described by a non-specialized science: literary history. These distinctions are not much observed, nor do they seem very necessary; they are nothing else than aspects of patristic study as it forms part of fundamental theology, of positive theology, and of literary history.

== Availability of patristic texts ==
A vast number of patristic texts are available in their original languages in Jacques Paul Migne's two great patrologies, Patrologia Latina and Patrologia Graeca. For Syriac and other Eastern languages the Patrologia Orientalis (Patrologia Syriaca earlier) is less complete and can be largely supplemented by the Corpus Scriptorum Christianorum Orientalium. Noted collections containing re-edited patristic texts (also discoveries and new attributions) are the Corpus Christianorum, Sources Chrétiennes, Corpus Scriptorum Ecclesiasticorum Latinorum, and on a lesser scale Oxford Early Christian Texts, Fontes Christiani, and Études Augustiniennes.

English translations of patristic texts are readily available in a variety of collections. For example:

- The Ante-Nicene Fathers: The Writings of the Fathers Down to A.D.325 (Edinburgh: T&T Clark).
- A Select Library of the Nicene and Post-Nicene Fathers of the Christian Church (Edinburgh: T&T Clark).
- The Works of Saint Augustine, A Translation for the 21st Century (New York City Press).
- The Fathers of the Church (Washington, D.C.: Catholic University of America Press).
- Ancient Christian Writers (New York: Paulist Press).
- The Early Church Fathers (London; New York: Routledge-Taylor & Francis Group).
- The Popular Patristics Series (Crestwood, NY: St. Vladimir's Seminary Press).

A range of journals cover patristic studies:

- Augustinian Studies
- Church History (journal)
- The Journal of Ecclesiastical History
- Journal of Early Christian Studies
- Studia Patristica
- Vigiliae Christianae

== See also ==
- Armenian studies
- Coptology
- Early Christianity
- Ethiopian Studies
- First seven ecumenical councils
- Historiography of early Christianity
- Nag Hammadi library
- Papyrology
- Popular Patristics Series
- Syriac studies
- Women in the patristic age
  - List of Christian women of the patristic age
- Christian Classics Ethereal Library (free editions of patristic texts, among others)

== Sources ==
- "Patrology". Catholic Encyclopedia. 1911.
- Gérard Vallée (1999). The shaping of Christianity. New York: Paulist Press. ISBN 978-0809138678.
