= The Fathers of the Church =

Translations of patristic texts

The Fathers of the Church: A New Translation (FOTC or FC) is an ongoing book series of English translations of patristic texts from early Christian writers published by The Catholic University of America Press. Inaugurated by its first volume in 1947, The Apostolic Fathers, and initially planned by its founder and first editorial director Ludwig Schopp to span 72 volumes, the series aimed to supersede the nineteenth-century Ante-Nicene Fathers and Nicene and Post-Nicene Fathers collections, making use of critical editions of the relevant texts that had since become available, as well as better knowledge of patristic Greek and Latin, rendering the texts themselves into "contemporary English." Furthermore, each volume was to be coupled with useful features such as scholarly introductions, footnotes, bibliographies, and Scripture indices. Privately published by "Christian Heritage, Inc." and "Fathers of the Church, Inc." initially, the series was later transferred to The Catholic University of America Press in 1961.

According to Roy J. Deferrari, the principal editor of the series in its early years (1949–1960), the primary rationale behind the series was motivated by the "anti-Catholic bias" of the existing Ante-Nicene Fathers and Nicene and Post-Nicene Fathers editions, a bias he described as "nothing short of shocking to those who use them," and a desire to "supplant" those editions. Although originally focused on creating newer translations of previously translated texts, the series would later refocus to prioritize publishing texts never before translated into English.

In 1989, a new series titled The Fathers of the Church: Medieval Continuations was created, inaugurated by the first of six volumes of letters by St. Peter Damian, to expand the scope of translations beyond the first centuries of Christianity.

== List of FOTC volumes ==
1. (1947) The Apostolic Fathers. Translated by Francis X. Glimm, Gerald G. Walsh, and Joseph M.-F. Marique. Includes the First Epistle of St. Clement, the so-called Second Epistle of St. Clement, the seven epistles of St. Ignatius of Antioch, the Epistle of St. Polycarp, the Martyrdom of St. Polycarp, the Didache, the Epistle of Barnabas, the Shepherd of Hermas, the Epistle to Diognetus, and the fragments of St. Papias.
2. (1947) St. Augustine. Christian Instruction (trans. John J. Gavigan); Admonition and Grace (trans. John Courtney Murray); The Christian Combat (trans. Robert P. Russell); Faith, Hope and Charity (trans. Bernard M. Peebles).
3. (1947) Salvian the Presbyter. The Writings of Salvian, the Presbyter. Translated by Jeremiah F. O'Sullivan. Includes The Governance of God, the epistles of Salvian, and the Four Books of Timothy to the Church.
4. (1947) St. Augustine. The Immortality of the Soul (trans. Ludwig Schopp); The Magnitude of the Soul (trans. John J. McMahon); On Music (trans. Robert Catesby Taliaferro); The Advantage of Believing (trans. Luanne Meagher); On Faith in Things Unseen (trans. Roy Joseph Deferrari and Mary Francis McDonald).
5. (1948) St. Augustine. The Happy Life (trans. Ludwig Schopp); Answer to Skeptics (trans. Denis J. Kavanagh); Divine Providence and the Problem of Evil (trans. Robert P. Russell); Soliloquies (trans. Thomas F. Gilligan).
6. (1948) St. Justin Martyr. The Writings of Saint Justin Martyr. Translated by Thomas B. Falls. Includes the First Apology, the Second Apology, and the Dialogue with Trypho, as well as spurious works scholars categorized as Pseudo-Justin: The Exhortation to the Greeks, the Discourse to the Greeks, and The Monarchy or the Rule of God.
7. (1949) St. Nicetas of Remesiana. Writings (trans. Gerald G. Walsh). Sulpicius Severus. Writings (trans. Bernard M. Peebles). St. Vincent of Lérins. Commonitories (trans. Rudolph E. Morris). St. Prosper of Aquitaine. Grace and Free Will (trans. J. Reginald O'Donnell).
8. (1950) St. Augustine. The City of God, Books I–VII. Translated by Demetrius B. Zema and Gerald G. Walsh.
9. (1950) St. Basil. Ascetical Works. Translated by M. Monica Wagner.
10. (1950) Tertullian. Apologetical Works. Includes Apology (trans. Emily Joseph Daly); The Testimony of the Soul (trans. Rudolph Arbesmann); To Scapula (trans. Rudolph Arbesmann); and On the Soul (trans. Edwin A. Quain). Minucius Felix. Octavius. Translated by Rudolph Arbesmann.
11. (1951) St. Augustine. Commentary on the Lord's Sermon on the Mount with Seventeen Related Sermons. Translated by Denis J. Kavanagh.
12. (1951) St. Augustine. Letters, Volume I (1–82). Translated by Wilfrid Parsons.
13. (1951) St. Basil. Letters, Volume 1 (1–185). Translated by Agnes Clare Way. Notes by Roy J. Deferrari.
14. (1952) St. Augustine. The City of God, Books VIII–XVI. Translated by Gerald G. Walsh and Grace Monahan.
15. (1952) Early Christian Biographies. Includes Life of St. Cyprian by Pontius (trans. Mary Magdeleine Müller and Roy J. Defferari); Life of St. Ambrose by Paulinus (trans. John A. Lacy); Life of St. Augustine by Bishop Possidius (trans. Mary Magdeleine Müller and Roy J. Defferari); Life of St. Anthony by St. Athanasius (trans. Mary Emily Keenan); Life of St. Paul the First Hermit by St. Jerome (trans. Marie Liguori Ewald); Life of St. Hilarion by St. Jerome (trans. Marie Liguori Ewald); Life of Malchus by St. Jerome (trans. Marie Liguori Ewald); Life of St. Epiphanius by Ennodius (trans. Genevieve Marie Cook); A Sermon on the Life of St. Honoratus by St. Hilary (trans. Roy J. Deferrari).
16. (1952) St. Augustine. Treatises on Various Subjects. Includes The Christian Life (trans. Mary Sarah Muldowney); Lying (trans. Mary Sarah Muldowney); Against Lying (trans. Harold B. Jaffee); Continence (trans. Mary Francis McDonald); Patience (trans. Luanne Meagher); The Excellence of Widowhood (trans. M. Clement Eagan); The Work of Monks (trans. Mary Sarah Muldowney); The Usefulness of Fasting (trans. Mary Sarah Muldowney); The Eight Questions of Dulcitius (trans. Mary DeFerrari).
17. (1953) St. Peter Chrysologus. Selected Sermons. Translated by George E. Ganss. St. Valerian. Homilies. Translated by George E. Ganss.
18. (1953) St. Augustine. Letters, Volume II (83–130). Translated by Wilfrid Parsons.
19. (1953) Eusebius of Caesarea. Ecclesiastical History, Books 1–5. Translated by Roy J. Deferrari.
20. (1953) St. Augustine. Letters, Volume III (131–164). Translated by Wilfrid Parsons.
21. (1953) St. Augustine. Confessions. Translated by Vernon J. Bourke.
22. (1953) St. Gregory of Nazianzus and St. Ambrose. Funeral Orations. Translated by Leo P. McCauley, John J. Sullivan, Martin R. P. McGuire, and Roy J. Deferrari.
23. (1954) Clement of Alexandria. Christ the Educator. Translated by Simon P. Wood.
24. (1954) St. Augustine. The City of God, Books XVII–XXII. Translated by Gerald G. Walsh and Daniel J. Honan.
25. (1954) St. Hilary of Poitiers. The Trinity. Translated by Stephen McKenna.
26. (1954) St. Ambrose. Letters. Translated by Mary Melchior Beyenka.
27. (1955) St. Augustine. Treatises on Marriage and Other Subjects. Includes The Good Marriage (trans. Charles T. Wilcox); Adulterous Marriage (trans. Charles T. Huegelmeyer); Holy Virginity (trans. John McQuade); Faith and Works (trans. Marie Liguori); The Creed (trans. Marie Liguori); Faith and the Creed (trans. Robert P. Russell); The Care to Be Taken for the Dead (trans. John A. Lacy); In Answer to the Jews (trans. Marie Liguori); The Divination of Demons (trans. Ruth Wentworth Brown).
28. (1955) St. Basil. Letters, Volume 2 (186–368). Translated by Agnes Clare Way. Notes by Roy J. Deferrari.
29. (1955) Eusebius of Caesarea. Ecclesiastical History, Books 6–10. Translated by Roy J. Deferrari.
30. (1955) St. Augustine. Letters, Volume IV (165–203). Translated by Wilfrid Parsons.
31. (1956) St. Caesarius of Arles. Sermons, Volume I (1–80). Translated by Mary Magdeleine Mueller.
32. (1956) St. Augustine. Letters, Volume V (204–270). Translated by Wilfrid Parsons.
33. (1957) St. John Chrysostom. Commentary on Saint John the Apostle and Evangelist: Homilies 1–47. Translated by Thomas Aquinas Goggin.
34. (1957) St. Leo the Great. Letters. Translated by Edmund Hunt.
35. (1957) St. Augustine. Against Julian. Translated by Matthew A. Schumacher.
36. (1958) St. Cyprian. Treatises. Includes To Donatus (trans. Roy J. Deferrari); The Dress of Virgins (trans. Angela Elizabeth Keenan); The Lapsed (trans. Roy J. Deferrari); The Unity of the Church (trans. Roy J. Deferrari); The Lord's Prayer (trans. Roy J. Deferrari); To Demetrian (trans. Roy J. Deferrari); Morality (trans. Mary Hannan Mahoney); Works and Almsgiving (trans. Roy J. Deferrari); The Good of Patience (trans. George Edward Conway); Jealousy and Envy (trans. Roy J. Deferrari); Exhortation to Martyrdom, To Fortunatus (trans. Roy J. Deferrari); That Idols Are Not Gods (trans. Roy J. Deferrari). The title page of Morality alternatively names Roy J. Deferrari as the translator.
37. (1958) St. John of Damascus. Writings. Translated by Frederic H. Chase. Includes The Fount of Knowledge, On Heresies, and The Orthodox Faith.
38. (1959) St. Augustine. Sermons on the Liturgical Seasons. Translated by Mary Sarah Muldowney. Includes sermons for the Feast of the Nativity (184–196), New Year's Day (197–198), the Epiphany (199–204), Lent (205–211), the recent converts (212–218), the Vigil of Easter (219–223), Easter Sunday (224–228), the Easter season (229–260), and the Feast of the Ascension (261–265).
39. (1959) St. Gregory the Great. Dialogues. Translated by Odo John Zimmerman.
40. (1959) Tertullian. Disciplinary, Moral and Ascetical Works. Includes To the Martyrs (trans. Rudolph Arbesmann); Spectacles (trans. Rudolph Arbesmann); The Apparel of Women (trans. Edwin A. Quain); Prayer (trans. Emily Joseph Daly); Patience (trans. Emily Joseph Daly); The Chaplet (trans. Edwin A. Quain); Flight in Time of Persecution (trans. Edwin A. Quain).
41. (1959) St. John Chrysostom. Commentary on Saint John the Apostle and Evangelist: Homilies 48–88. Translated by Thomas Aquinas Goggin.
42. (1961) St. Ambrose. Hexameron, Paradise, Cain and Abel. Translated by John J. Savage.
43. (1962) Prudentius. The Poems of Prudentius, Volume 1. Translated by M. Clement Eagan.
44. (1963) St. Ambrose. Theological and Dogmatic Works. Translated by Roy J. Deferrari. Includes The Mysteries, The Holy Spirit, The Sacrament of the Incarnation of Our Lord, and The Sacraments.
45. (1963) St. Augustine. The Trinity. Translated by Stephen McKenna.
46. (1963) St. Basil. Exegetic Homilies. Translated by Agnes Clare Way.
47. (1964) St. Caesarius of Arles. Sermons, Volume II (81–186). Translated by Mary Magdeleine Mueller.
48. (1964) St. Jerome. The Homilies of Saint Jerome, Volume I (1–59 on the Psalms). Translated by Marie Liguori Ewald.
49. (1964) Lactantius. The Divine Institutes, Books I–VII. Translated by Mary Francis McDonald.
50. (1964) Paulus Orosius. The Seven Books of History Against the Pagans. Translated by Roy J. Deferrari.
51. (1964) St. Cyprian. Letters (1–81). Translated by Rose Bernard Donna.
52. (1965) Prudentius. The Poems of Prudentius, Volume 2. Translated by M. Clement Eagan.
53. (1965) St. Jerome. Dogmatic and Polemical Works. Translated by John N. Hritzu. Includes On the Perpetual Virginity of the Blessed Mary Against Helvidius, The Apology Against the Books of Rufinus, and The Dialogue Against the Pelagians.
54. (1965) Lactantius. The Minor Works. Translated by Mary Francis McDonald. Includes The Workmanship of God, The Wrath of God, The Deaths of the Persecutors, The Phoenix, and attributed works (On the Motions of the Soul and On the Passion of the Lord).
55. (1965) Eugippius. The Life of Saint Severin. Translated by Ludwig Bieler, with the collaboration of Ludmilla Krestan.
56. (1966) St. Augustine. The Catholic and Manichaean Ways of Life. Translated by Donald A. Gallagher and Idella J. Gallagher.
57. (1966) St. Jerome. The Homilies of Saint Jerome, Volume 2 (60–96). Translated by Marie Liguori Ewald.
58. (1967) St. Gregory of Nyssa. Ascetical Works. Translated by Virginia Woods Callahan. Includes On Virginity, On What It Means to Call Oneself a Christian, On Perfection, On the Christian Mode of Life, The Life of Saint Macrina, and On the Soul and the Resurrection.
59. (1968) St. Augustine. The Teacher; The Free Choice of the Will; Grace and Free Will. Translated by Robert P. Russell.
60. (1968) St. Augustine. The Retractations. Translated by Mary Inez Bogan.
61. (1969) St. Cyril of Jerusalem. The Works of Saint Cyril of Jerusalem, Volume 1. Includes the Introductory Lecture (Procatechesis) (trans. Anthony A. Stephenson) and the Lenten Lectures (Catecheses), I–XII (trans. Leo P. McCauley).
62. (1969) Iberian Fathers, Volume 1. Translated by Claude W. Barlow. Includes the writings of St. Martin of Braga, Paschasius of Dumium, and St. Leander of Seville.
63. (1969) Iberian Fathers, Volume 2. Translated by Claude W. Barlow. Includes the writings of St. Braulio of Saragossa and St. Fructuosus of Braga.
64. (1970) St. Cyril of Jerusalem. The Works of Saint Cyril of Jerusalem, Volume 2. Includes the Lenten Lectures (Catecheses), XIII–XVIII (trans. Leo P. McCauley); Mystagogical Lectures (trans. Anthony A. Stephenson); Sermon on the Paralytic (trans. Anthony A. Stephenson); Letter to Constantius (trans. Anthony A. Stephenson); fragments (trans. Anthony A. Stephenson).
65. (1972) St. Ambrose. Seven Exegetical Works. Translated by Michael P. McHugh. Includes Isaac, or the Soul, Death as a Good, Jacob and a Happy Life, Joseph, The Patriarchs, Flight from the World, and The Prayer of Job and David.
66. (1973) St. Caesarius of Arles. Sermons, Volume III (187–238). Translated by Mary Magdeleine Mueller.
67. (1974) Novatian. The Trinity; The Spectacles; Jewish Foods; In Praise of Purity; Letters. Translated by Russell J. DeSimone.
68. (1979) St. John Chrysostom. Discourses Against Judaizing Christians. Translated by Paul W. Harkins.
69. (1981) Marius Victorinus. Theological Treatises on the Trinity. Translated by Mary T. Clark.
70. (1982) St. Augustine. Eighty-Three Different Questions. Translated by David L. Mosher.
71. (1982) Origen. Homilies on Genesis and Exodus. Translated by Ronald E. Heine.
72. (1984) St. John Chrysostom. On the Incomprehensible Nature of God. Translated by Paul W. Harkins.

== See also ==
- Ante-Nicene Fathers
- Nicene and Post-Nicene Fathers
- Ancient Christian Writers
- Ancient Christian Commentary on Scripture
