= Ancient Christian Writers =

The Ancient Christian Writers: The Works of the Fathers in Translation (abbreviated as ACW) is a book series with English translations of works by early Christian writers. The translations are made from Latin and Greek. The series was founded by Johannes Quasten and Joseph C. Plumpe, the first volume being published in 1946.

== Editors and publishers ==
=== Editors ===
- Vols. 1–27: Johannes Quasten and Joseph C. Plumpe
- Vols. 28–33: Johannes Quasten and Walter J. Burghardt
- Vols. 34–46: Johannes Quasten, Walter J. Burghardt, and Thomas Comerford Lawler
- Vols. 47–53: Walter J. Burghardt and Thomas Comerford Lawler
- Vols. 54–55: Walter J. Burghardt, Thomas Comerford Lawler, and John J. Dillon
- Vols. 56–57: Walter J. Burghardt, John J. Dillon, and Dennis D. McManus
- Vols. 58–60: Walter J. Burghardt and John J. Dillon (editorial board), Dennis D. McManus (managing editor)
- Vols. 61–62: John Dillon (editorial board) and Dennis D. McManus (managing editor)
- Vol. 63: Boniface Ramsey, John Dillon, Jeremy Driscoll, Thomas Macy Finn, Thomas L. Knoebel, Joseph Lienhard, John A. McGuckin (advisory board)

=== Publishers ===
- Newman Press (earlier volumes; later an imprint of Paulist Press)
- Paulist Press (later volumes)

== List of volumes ==
1. (1946) The Epistles of St. Clement of Rome and St. Ignatius of Antioch (translated and annotated by James A. Kleist, SJ) ISBN 9780809100385
2. (1946) St. Augustine. The First Catechetical Instruction (translated and annotated by Joseph P. Christopher) ISBN 9780809100477
3. (1946) St. Augustine. Faith, Hope, and Charity (translated and annotated by Louis A. Arand, SS) ISBN 9780809100453
4. (1947) Julianus Pomerius. The Contemplative Life (translated and annotated by Mary Josephine Suelzer) ISBN 9780809102457
5. (1948) St. Augustine. The Lord's Sermon on the Mount (translated by John J. Epson, SS; introduction by Johannes Quasten; notes by Joseph C. Plumpe) ISBN 9780809102464
6. (1948) The Didache. The Epistle of Barnabas. The Epistles and the Martyrdom of St. Polycarp. The Fragments of Papias. The Epistle to Diognetus (translated and annotated by James A. Kleist, SJ) ISBN 9780809102471
7. (1949) Arnobius of Sicca. The Case Against the Pagans. Vol. 1: Introduction, Books 1—3 (translated and annotated by George E. McCracken) ISBN 9780809102488
8. (1949) Arnobius of Sicca. The Case Against the Pagans. Vol. 2: Books IV—VII, index (translated and annotated by George E. McCracken) ISBN 9780809102495
9. (1950) St. Augustine. The Greatness of the Soul. The Teacher (translated and annotated by Joseph M. Colleran, CSsR) ISBN 9780809100606
10. (1950) St. Athanasius. The Life of Saint Anthony (translated and annotated by Robert T. Meyer) ISBN 9780809102501
11. (1950) St. Gregory the Great. Pastoral Care (translated and annotated by Henry Davis, SJ) ISBN 9780809102518
12. (1950) St. Augustine. Against the Academics (translated and annotated by John J. O’Meara) ISBN 9780809102525
13. (1951) Tertullian. Treatises on Marriage and Remarriage: To His Wife; An Exhortation to Chastity; Monogamy (translated and annotated by William P. Le Saint, SJ) ISBN 9780809101498
14. (1952) St. Prosper of Aquitaine. The Call of All Nations (translated and annotated by P. De Letter, SJ) ISBN 9780809102532
15. (1952) St. Augustine. Sermons for Christmas and Epiphany [Sermons 51, 140, 184—204 Ben.] (translated and annotated by Thomas Comerford Lawler) ISBN 9780809101375
16. (1952) St. Irenaeus. Proof of the Apostolic Preaching (translated and annotated by Joseph P. Smith, SJ) ISBN 9780809102648
17. (1953) The works of St. Patrick. St. Secundinus: Hymn on St. Patrick (translated and annotated by Ludwig Bieler) ISBN 9780809102549
18. (1954) St. Gregory of Nyssa. The Lord's Prayer. The Beatitudes (translated and annotated by Hilda C. Graef) ISBN 9780809102556
19. (1954) Origen. Prayer. Exhortation to Martyrdom (translated and annotated by John J. O’Meara) ISBN 9780809102563
20. (1955) Rufinus. A Commentary on the Apostles' Creed (translated and annotated by J.N.D. Kelly) ISBN 9780809102570
21. (1955) St. Maximus the Confessor. The ascetic life. The four centuries on charity (translated and annotated by Polycarp Sherwood, OSB) ISBN 9780809102587
22. (1955) St. Augustine. The problem of free choice (translated and annotated by Dom Mark Pontifex) ISBN 9780809102594
23. (1956) Athenagoras. Embassy for the Christians. The resurrection of the dead (translated and annotated by Joseph Hugh Crehan, SJ) ISBN 9780809100361
24. (1956) Tertullian. The treatise against Hermogenes (translated and annotated by J.H. Waszink) ISBN 9780809101481
25. (1957) St. Cyprian. The lapsed. The unity of the Catholic Church (translated and annotated by Maurice Bévenot, SJ) ISBN 9780809102600
26. (1957) Origen. The Song of Songs: commentary and homilies (translated and annotated by R.P. Lawson) ISBN 9780809102617
27. (1958) St. Methodius. The symposium: a treatise on chastity (translated and annotated by Herbert Musurillo, SJ) ISBN 9780809101436
28. (1959) Tertullian. Treatises on penance: On penitence and On purity (translated and annotated by William P. Le Saint, SJ) ISBN 9780809101504
29. (1960) St. Augustine, On the Psalms. Vol. I: Psalms 1–29 (translated and annotated by Dame Scholastica Hebgin and Dame Felicitas Corrigan) ISBN 9780809101047
30. (1961) St. Augustine, On the Psalms. Vol. II: Psalms 30–37 (translated and annotated by Dame Scholastica Hebgin and Dame Felicitas Corrigan) ISBN 9780809101054
31. (1963) St. John Chrysostom. Baptismal instructions (translated and annotated by Paul W. Harkins) ISBN 9780809102624
32. (1963) Prosper of Aquitaine. Defense of St. Augustine (translated and annotated by P. De Letter, SJ) ISBN 9780809102631
33. (1963) The letters of St. Jerome. Vol. 1: Letters 1–22 (translated by Charles Christopher Mierow, introduction and notes by Thomas Comerford Lawler) ISBN 9780809100873
34. (1965) Palladius. The Lausiac History (translated and annotated by Robert T. Meyer) ISBN 9780809100835
35. (1966) Letters of St. Paulinus of Nola. Vol. 1: Letters 1–22 (translated and annotated by P.G. Walsh) ISBN 9780809100880
36. (1967) Letters of St. Paulinus of Nola. Vol. 2: Letters 23–51 (translated and annotated by P.G. Walsh) ISBN 9780809100897
37. (1970) Firmicus Maternus. The error of the pagan religions (translated and annotated by Clarence A. Forbes) ISBN 9780809100392
38. (1970) Egeria. Diary of a pilgrimage (translated and annotated by George E. Gingras) ISBN 9780809100293
39. (1974) The Octavius of Marcus Minucius Felix (translated and annotated by G.W. Clarke) ISBN 9780809101894
40. (1975) The Poems of St. Paulinus of Nola (translated and annotated by P.G. Walsh) ISBN 9780809101979
41. (1982) St. Augustine. The Literal Meaning of Genesis. Vol. 1: Books 1—6 (translated and annotated by John Hammond Taylor, SJ) ISBN 9780809103263
42. (1982) St. Augustine. The Literal Meaning of Genesis. Vol. 2: Books 7–12 (translated and annotated by John Hammond Taylor, SJ) ISBN 9780809103270
43. (1984) The Letters of St. Cyprian of Carthage. Vol. 1: Letters 1–27 (translated and annotated by G.W. Clarke) ISBN 9780809103416
44. (1984) The Letters of St. Cyprian of Carthage. Vol. 2: Letters 28–54 (translated and annotated by G.W. Clarke) ISBN 9780809103423
45. (1985) Palladius. Dialogue on the Life of St. John Chrysostom (translated and annotated by Robert T. Meyer) ISBN 9780809103584
46. (1986) The Letters of St. Cyprian of Carthage. Vol. 3: Letters 55–66 (translated and annotated by G.W. Clarke) ISBN 9780809103690
47. (1989) The Letters of St. Cyprian of Carthage. Vol. 4: Letters 67–82 (translated and annotated by G.W. Clarke) ISBN 9780809103706
48. (1988) St. Augustine. On Faith and Works (translated and annotated by Gregory J. Lombardo, CSC, STD) ISBN 9780809104062
49. (1988) Theodoret of Cyrus. On Divine Providence (translated and annotated by Thomas Halton) ISBN 9780809104208
50. (1989) Sermons of St. Maximus of Turin (translated and annotated by Boniface Ramsey, OP) ISBN 9780809104239
51. (1990) Cassiodorus. Explanation of the Psalms. Vol. 1: Psalms 1–50 [1–51(50)] (translated and annotated by P.G. Walsh) ISBN 9780809104413
52. (1991) Cassiodorus. Explanation of the Psalms. Vol. 2: Psalms 51–100 [52(51)–101(100)] (translated and annotated by P.G. Walsh) ISBN 9780809104444
53. (1991) Cassiodorus. Explanation of the Psalms. Vol. 3: Psalms 101–150 [102(101)–150] (translated and annotated by P.G. Walsh) ISBN 9780809104451
54. (1992) Origen. Treatise on the Passover and Dialogue of Origen with Heraclides and his Fellow Bishops on the Father, the Son, and the Soul (translated and annotated by Robert J. Daly, SJ) ISBN 9780809104529
55. (1992) St. Irenaeus of Lyons. Against the Heresies. Volume I: Book I (translated and annotated by Dominic J. Unger, OFM Cap; with further revisions by John J. Dillon) ISBN 9780809104543
56. (1997) St. Justin Martyr. The First and Second Apologies (translated with introduction and notes by Leslie William Barnard) ISBN 9780809104727
57. (1997) John Cassian. The Conferences (translated and annotated by Boniface Ramsey, OP) ISBN 9780809104840
58. (2000) John Cassian. The Institutes (translated and annotated by Boniface Ramsey, OP) ISBN 9780809105229
59. (2003) Evagrius Ponticus. Ad monachos (translation and commentary by Jeremy Driscoll, OSB) ISBN 9780809105601
60. (2004) Quodvultdeus of Carthage. The Creedal Homilies (translation and commentary by Thomas Macy Finn) ISBN 9780809105724
61. (2008) Isidore of Seville. De ecclesiasticis officiis (translation and introduction by Thomas L. Knoebel) ISBN 9780809105816, 9781616439118
62. (2010) Origen. Homilies 1–14 on Ezekiel (translation and introduction by Thomas P. Scheck) ISBN 9780809105670
63. (2010) Julian of Toledo. Prognosticum futuri saeculi: Foreknowledge of the World to Come (translated, edited and introduced by Sergio Stancati, OP). ISBN 9780809105687
64. (2012) St. Irenaeus of Lyons. Against the Heresies. Book 3 (translated by Dominic J. Unger, OFM Cap; with further revisions by Matthew C. Steenberg) ISBN 9780809105892
65. (2012) St. Irenaeus of Lyons. Against the Heresies. Book 2 (translated by Dominic J. Unger, OFM Cap; with further revisions by John J. Dillon) ISBN 9780809105991
66. (2012) St. Jerome. Commentary on Ecclesiastes (Richard J. Goodrich) ISBN 9780809106011
67. (2013) Theodoret of Cyrus. A Cure for Pagan Maladies (translation and introduction by Thomas Halton) ISBN 9780809106066
68. (2015) St. Jerome. Commentary on Isaiah. Including St. Jerome's translation of Origen's Homilies 1-9 on Isaiah (translated and with an Introduction by Thomas P. Scheck) ISBN 9780809106080
69. (2015) Theodore the Studite. Writing on Iconoclasm (translated and introduced by Thomas Cattoi) ISBN 9780809106110
70. (2016) Sulpicius Severus. Complete Works (introduction, translation, and notes by Richard J. Goodrich) ISBN 9780809106202
71. (2017) St. Jerome. Commentary on Ezekiel (translated with an introduction by Thomas P. Scheck) ISBN 9780809106318
72. (2024) St. Irenaeus of Lyons. Against the Heresies. Books 4–5. (translated by Dominic J. Unger, OFM Cap; with further revisions by Scott D. Moringiello)
73. (2018) Isidore of Seville. Sententiae (translated and with notes by Thomas L. Knoebel) ISBN 9780809106363
74. (2020) The Teachings of the Desert Fathers: Verba Seniorum III, VI, and VII (translated and introduced by Richard J. Goodrich) ISBN 9780809106455, 9781587687198
75. (2018) Chromatius of Aquileia. Sermons and Tractates on Matthew (translated and introduced by Thomas P. Scheck) ISBN 9780809106462, 9781587687228
76. (2022) Pelagius. Commentaries on the Thirteen Epistles of Paul with the Libellus fidei (translated and introduced by Thomas P. Scheck) ISBN 9780809106592
77. (2024) St. Jerome. Commentary on Daniel (translated with an introduction by Thomas P. Scheck) ISBN 9780809106707
78. (2024) St. Cyprian. Pamphlets on Pandemics (translated and introduced by Geoffrey D. Dunn) ISBN 9780809104468

== See also ==
- Ante-Nicene Fathers
- Nicene and Post-Nicene Fathers
- The Fathers of the Church

== Sources ==
- Paulist Press
- "Ancient Christian Writers (ACW)". Internet Archive.
- List of volumes 1—40 at the end of vol. 40
