= Jan Hendrik Waszink =

Jan Hendrik Waszink (17 October 1908, Renswoude – 5 October 1990, Lugano) was a Dutch Latin scholar, Professor of Latin at Leiden University. Best known as an expert on Tertullian, he also edited the translation and commentary by Calcidius on Plato's Timaeus.

Waszink is counted following Franz Joseph Dölger and others as one of the founders of Reallexikon für Antike und Christentum and with Christine Mohrmann of Vigiliae Christianae.

== Life ==
Waszink was born in Renswoude, where his father was a doctor. He was educated at a local grammar school before studying classics at Leiden University, writing his PhD thesis (1933) on Tertullian. After being a grammar school teacher, he was appointed Professor of Latin at Leiden in 1946. Though best known for his interest in patristics - fired by Dölger's seminars - he also took an interest in Neo-Latin, writing on Petrarch and participating in the edition of Erasmus. Waszink became member of the Royal Netherlands Academy of Arts and Sciences in 1950. He died on 5 October 1990, while holidaying with friends.

== Works ==
- (ed.) De anima by Tertullian, 1933.
- (with W.J. Verdenius) Aristotle on coming-to be and passing-away: some comments, 1946.
- (ed. and tr.) De Anima by Tertullian. 1947
- (ed.) Adversus Hermogenem by Tertullian. Utrecht, 1956.
- (tr.) Adversus Hermogenem by Tertullian. London, 1956 (ACW 24).
- (ed.) Timaeus by Plato, tr. by Calcidius. 1962.
- Studien zum Timaioskommentar des Calcidius, 1964.
- Opuscula selecta, 1979.
- (tr, with annotation) De Anima by Tertullian
- (ed. with J. C. M van Winden) De idololatria by Tertullian, 1987.
