= Clemens Scholten =

German theologian

Clemens Scholten (born 1955) is a major contemporary authority on the works of the sixth century Christian Alexandrian philosopher John Philopon. His early publications were devoted to Nag Hammadi and the Alexandrian Catechetical School. He has also edited a work of Theodoret.

He taught in the Catholic Theology and Philosophy departments of the University of Cologne until 2021.

== Selected publications ==
- Martyrium und Sophiamythos im Gnostizismus nach den Texten von Nag Hammadi, 1987
- Die alexandrinische Katechetenschule, 1995
- Antike Naturphilosopĥie und christliche Kosmologie in der Schrift "De Opificio Mundi" des Johannes Philoponos [Patristische Texte und Studien 45], De Gruyter 1996
- Johannes Philoponos, De Opificio Mundi = Uber die Erschaffung der Welt [ Fontes Christiani 23/1,2,3], Brepols 1997
- Johannes Philoponos, De Aeternitate Mundi = Uber die Ewigkeit der Welt [ Fontes Christiani 64/1,2,3,4,5], Brepols 2009-2011
- Theodoret, De Graecorum Affectione Curatione: Heilung der Griechischen Krankheiten [ Vigiliae Christianae ], Brill 2015

== Sources ==
JSTOR:41 Related Entries
