= Quasten =

Quasten is a surname. Notable people with the surname include:

- Johannes Quasten (1900–1987), German Catholic theologian and academic
- Paul Quasten (born 1985), Dutch-born Czech footballer
