= Ante-Nicene Fathers (book) =

Collection of early Christian writings

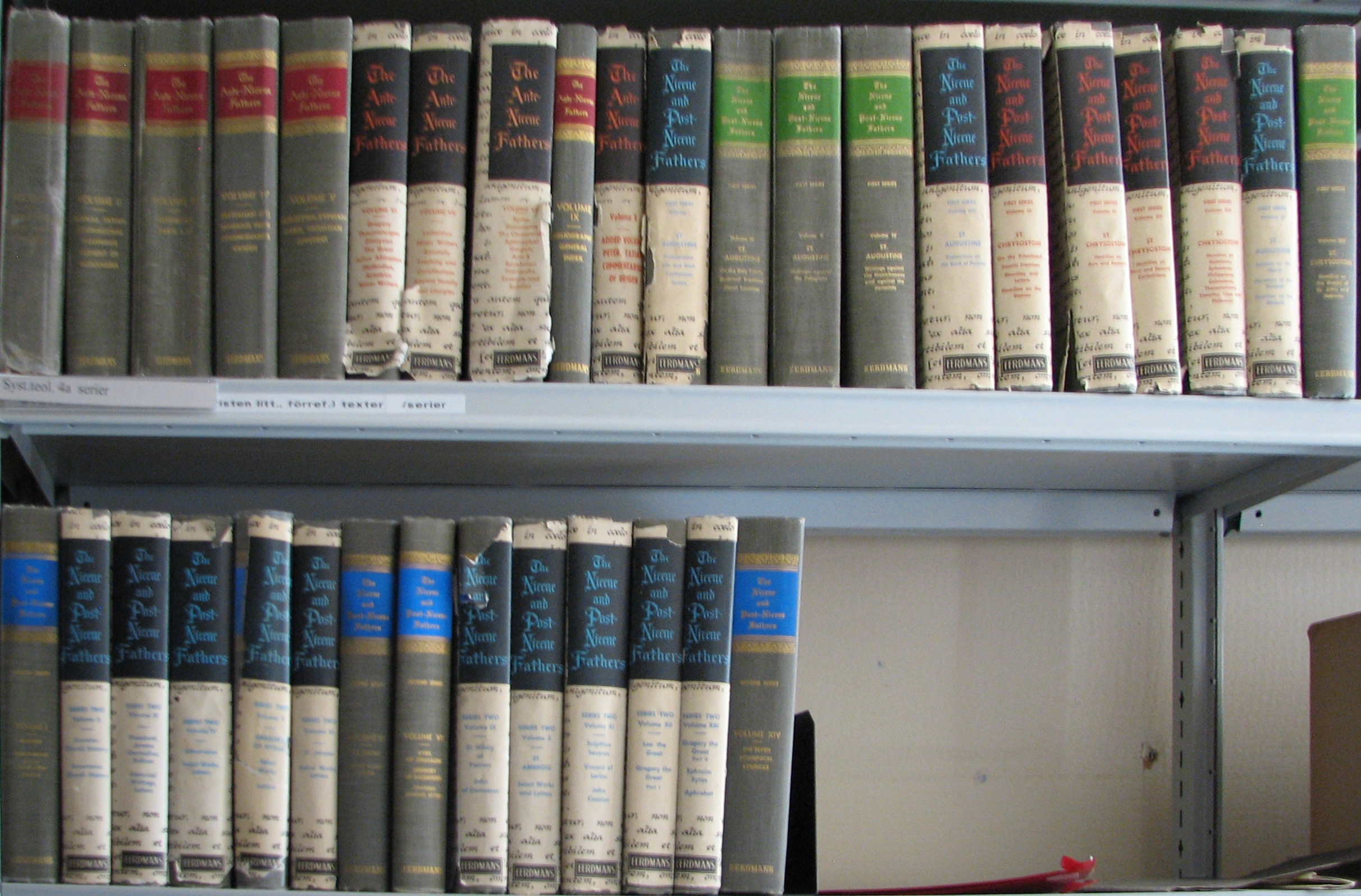
Shelf containing the Ante-Nicene Fathers

The Ante-Nicene Fathers: The Writings of the Fathers Down to A.D. 325 (abbreviated ANF) is a collection of books in 10 volumes (one volume is indexes) containing English translations of the majority of Early Christian writings. The period covers the beginning of Christianity until the promulgation of the Nicene Creed at the First Council of Nicaea.

== Publication ==
The series was originally published between 1867 and 1873 by the Presbyterian publishing house T. & T. Clark in Edinburgh under the title Ante-Nicene Christian Library (ANCL), as a response to the Oxford Movement's Library of the Fathers which was perceived as too strongly identified with the Anglo-Catholic movement. The volumes were edited by Rev. Alexander Roberts and James Donaldson. This series was available by subscription, but the editors were unable to interest enough subscribers to commission a translation of the homilies of Origen.

In 1885 the Christian Literature Company, first of Buffalo, then New York, began to issue the volumes in a reorganized form. This was done without permission, and was indeed a pirate edition. The new series was edited by the Episcopal bishop of New York, A. Cleveland Coxe. Coxe gave his series the title The Ante-Nicene Fathers. By 1896, this American edition/revision was complete. Unable to close down the pirate, T. & T. Clark were obliged to make what terms they could.

In 1897, a volume 9, which contained new translations, was published by T. & T. Clark as an additional volume, to complete the original ANCL. Apart from volume 9, the contents entirely derived from the ANCL, but in a more chronological order. Coxe added his own introductions and notes, which were criticized by academic authorities and Roman Catholic reviewers.

T. & T. Clark then associated with the Christian Literature Company and with other American publishers for the publication of the Nicene and Post-Nicene Fathers.

== Volumes ==
- Volume 1: Apostolic Fathers, Justin Martyr, Irenaeus
- Volume 2: Hermas, Tatian, Athenagoras, Theophilus, Clement of Alexandria
- Volume 3: Tertullian
- Volume 4: Tertullian (IV), Minucius Felix, Commodian, Origen
- Volume 5: Hippolytus, Cyprian, Caius, Novatian, Appendix
- Volume 6: Gregory Thaumaturgus, Dionysius the Great, Julius Africanus, Anatolius and Minor Writers, Methodius, Arnobius
- Volume 7: Lactantius, Venantius, Asterius, Victorinus, Dionysius, Apostolic Teaching and Constitutions, Homily, and Liturgies
- Volume 8: Twelve Patriarchs, Excerpts and Epistles, The Clementina, Aprocryphal Gospels and Acts, Syriac Documents
- Volume 9: Gospel of Peter, Diatessaron, Testament of Abraham, Epistles of Clement, Origen and Miscellaneous Works
- Volume 10: Bibliography, General Index, Annotated Index of Authors and Works

== See also ==
- Church Fathers
- Nicene and Post-Nicene Fathers
- Ancient Christian Writers
- The Fathers of the Church
- Jacques Paul Migne
