= Charles Christopher Mierow =

American academic and classical scholar (1883–1961)

Charles Christopher Mierow (1883–1961) was an American academic and classical scholar.

He had a Princeton Ph.D. in classical languages and literature, and was known as a translator. In years the 1923–1924 and 1925–1934 he was president of Colorado College. He was appointed professor of biography at Carleton College, a position he held from 1935 to 1951.

== Works ==
=== Translations ===
- The Origin And Deeds Of The Goths of Jordanes.
- The letters of St. Jerome. Vol. 1: Letters 1–22, translated by Charles Christopher Mierow, introduction and notes by Thomas Comerford Lawler, 1963 (Ancient Christian Writers, 33) ISBN 9780809100873
- Charles Christopher Mierow, ed. The Deeds of Frederick Barbarossa. By Otto of Freising and his continuator, Rahewin; translated and annotated with an introduction by Charles Christopher Mierow with the collaboration of Richard Emery, reprinted from the 1956 edition ISBN 978-0-231-13419-4 on AC

=== Others ===
- Charles Christopher Mierow (1956). The Hallowed Flame. Principia Press of Illinois.
- Charles Christopher Mierow (1959). Saint Jerome: The Sage of Bethlehem. Milwaukee, WI: Bruce Publishing Company.
