= Cornelius Labeo =

3rd century Roman theologian and antiquarian

Cornelius Labeo was an ancient Roman theologian and antiquarian who wrote on such topics as the Roman calendar and the teachings of Etruscan religion (Etrusca disciplina). His works survive only in fragments and testimonia. He has been dated "plausibly but not provably" to the 3rd century AD. Labeo has been called "the most important Roman theologian" after Varro, whose work seems to have influenced him strongly. He is usually considered a Neoplatonist.

Labeo and Censorinus are the only authors with demonstrable interests in writing about Roman religion during the Crisis of the Third Century, a time of "military anarchy" between the death of Caracalla and the accession of Diocletian when scholarship seems mostly to have ground to a halt. Because religious and civil law in ancient Rome may overlap, the fragments of this Labeo are sometimes confused with those of the jurists Pacuvius Labeo and Marcus Antistius Labeo.

== Influence ==
Labeo was among the sources used by Macrobius, John Lydus, and Servius. It has sometimes been supposed that the Orphic verses given by Macrobius in the first book of his Saturnalia are taken from Labeo. His works were influential enough that he was targeted for criticism by Church Fathers such as Arnobius and Augustine. He may have been Arnobius's intermediate source for Porphyry, and possibly Martianus Capella's for Iamblichus.

Labeo was interested in such problems as the existence of good and bad numina, and whether intermediate beings should be called daimones (δαίμονες, daemons) or angeloi (ἄγγελοι, angels). Labeo is one of the Greek and Roman authors with whom Augustine of Hippo debates over the nature of "demons" in Book 8, On the City of God. In particular, he rejects Labeo's distinction between good and bad daimones, claiming that they are all impure spirits and thus evil. In classifying divine figures as gods, demigods, and heroes, Labeo placed Plato among demigods such as Hercules and Romulus.

In De mensibus ("On the months"), Lydus cites Labeo as his source for a list of thirty names for Aphrodite (Venus) and for explanations of customs pertaining to the calendar such as the etymologies of the names of the months. Labeo supported the view that the Roman goddess Maia was the Earth (Terra), named for her great size (magnitudine), to be identified with the Great Mother (Magna Mater) and the Good Goddess (Bona Dea), to whom a temple was dedicated on the Kalends of May.

== Apollo and Iao ==
Labeo wrote a book De oraculo Apollinis Clarii that has provided a key passage for understanding monotheistic tendencies in ancient Greek and Roman religious thought. When asked "Who is the supreme God?" Apollo responded:

Alas, you have not come to enquire about small matters.
You want to know who is the king of heaven
Whom even I do not know, yet revere according to tradition.

Apollo says that the supreme God is superior to him, ineffable and unknowable. Labeo also reports that an interpretation was sought for the Orphic verse "Zeus is One, Hades is One, Helios is One, Dionysus is One." According to Macrobius:

The authority of this line rests on an oracle of Clarian Apollo, in which another name for the Sun, too, is added, who is given among other names, in the same holy lines, that of Iao. For the Clarian Apollo, upon being asked which of the gods was meant by Iao, spoke as follows: "Initiates must hold their secrets—yet know! Iao is Hades in the winter, Zeus in spring, Helios in summer, and Dionysus in autumn." The force of this oracular saying, and the interpretation of the divinity and the name, whereby Father Liber and Sol are meant by Iao, Cornelius Labeo treats in his book titled On the Oracle of the Clarian Apollo.

This passage has been called "the most far-reaching and prominent evidence for the concept of theocrasy in pagan antiquity." "Many gods," Ramsay MacMullen observed, "were really aspects of a single god." "Iao" (Ἰαώ) is not explicitly identified as the god of the Jews, but the name was already established in Latin usage as such. Labeo tried to find a way to situate the Jewish god in the Olympian system. In late antiquity, "Iao" has a "magical potency" that came to embody the unifying tendency of Neopythagoreanism and Neoplatonism.

== Text ==
The most extensive treatment of Cornelius Labeo, including the collected fragments, is that of the Italian scholar P. Mastandrea, Un Neoplatonico Latino: Cornelio Labeone, testimonianze e frammenti (Leiden, 1979). English translation of the fragments appears in Hooker (tr.), John Lydus: On the Months (2017), pp. 200–205.

The work Peri keraunôn (Περὶ κεραυνῶν, On Lightnings) has sometimes been wrongly ascribed to him.
