= Nicene and Post-Nicene Fathers =

1886–1900 English translations of early Christian works

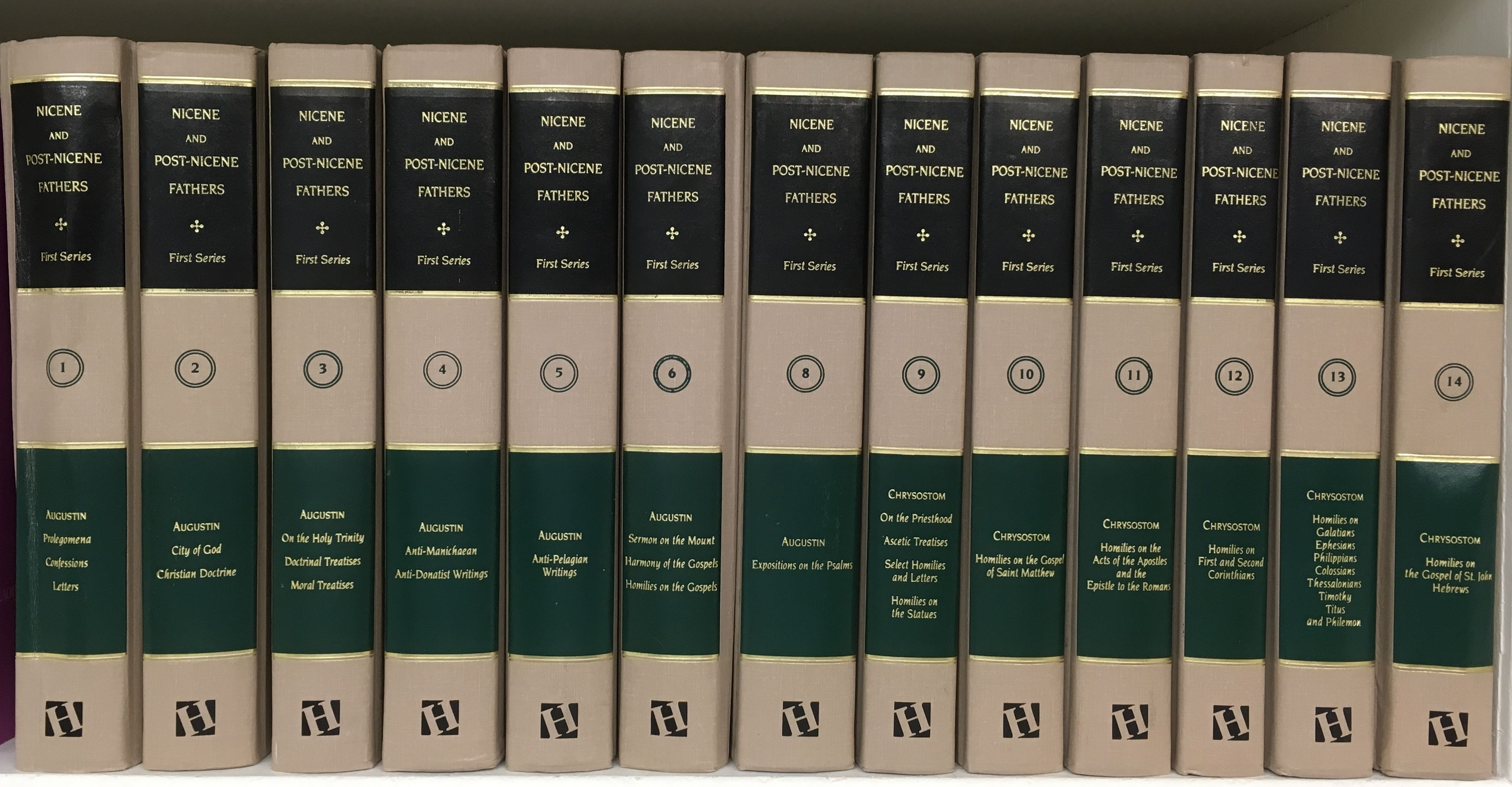
A set of the books: Nicene and Post-Nicene Fathers

A Select Library of the Nicene and Post-Nicene Fathers of the Christian Church, usually known as the Nicene and Post-Nicene Fathers (NPNF), is a set of books containing translations of early Christian writings into English. It was published between 1886 and 1900.

Unlike the Ante-Nicene Fathers which was produced by using earlier translations of the Ante-Nicene Christian Library (ANCL), the Nicene and Post-Nicene Fathers was printed simultaneously in Europe and in America, by T. & T. Clark, by Christian Literature Company and other American editors. The translations were in the main revised versions of those made for the Oxford Movement Library of the Fathers series. T. & T. Clark was surely convinced by the commercial success of the cheaper American version/revision of the ANCL, although of lesser quality on some minor points. The Swiss-born, German-educated Philip Schaff was commissioned to supervise the first series of the NPNF. He was joined by the British Henry Wace for the second series.

== Nicene and Post-Nicene Fathers, Series I ==
| Vol. | Contents | First Published |
|---|---|---|
| I. | Augustine: Prolegomena, Confessions, Letters | 1886 |
| II. | Augustine: The City of God, On Christian Doctrine | 1886 |
| III. | Augustine: On the Holy Trinity, Doctrinal Treatises, Moral Treatises On the Trinity. The Enchiridion. On the Catechising of the Uninstructed. A Treatise on Faith and the Creed. Concerning Faith of Things Not Seen. On the Profit of Believing. On the Creed: a Sermon to the Catechumens. On Continence. On the Good of Marriage. Of Holy Virginity. On the Good of Widowhood. On Lying. Against Lying. Of the Work of Monks. On Patience. On Care to Be Had for the Dead. | 1887 |
| IV. | Augustine: Anti-Manichaean Writings, Anti-Donatist Writings Of the Morals of the Catholic Church. On the Morals of the Manichaeans. Concerning Two Souls, Against the Manichaeans. Acts or Disputation Against Fortunatus, the Manichaean. Against the Epistle of Manichaeus Called Fundamental. Reply to Faustus the Manichaean (33 books). Concerning the Nature of Good, Against the Manichaeans. On Baptism, Against the Donatists (7 books). In Answer to the Letters of Petilian, the Donatist, Bishop of Cirta (3 books). A Treatise Concerning the Correction of the Donatists. | 1887 |
| V. | Augustine: Anti-Pelagian Writings On the Merits and Forgiveness of Sins, and on the Baptism of Infants (3 books). On the Spirit and the Letter. On Nature and Grace, Against Pelagius. Concerning Man's Perfection in Righteousness. On the Proceedings of Pelagius. A Treatise on the Grace of Christ, and on Original Sin. On Marriage and Concupiscence (2 books). On the Soul and Its Origin (4 books). A Treatise Against Two Letters of the Pelagians (4 books). A Treatise on Grace and Free Will. Treatise on Rebuke and Grace. A Treatise on the Predestination of the Saints. A Treatise on the Gift of Perseverance, Being the Second Book of the Predestination of the Saints. | 1887 |
| VI. | Augustine: Sermon on the Mount, Harmony of the Gospels, Homilies on the Gospels Our Lord's Sermon on the Mount. The Harmony of the Gospels. 97 Sermons on Selected Lessons of the New Testament. | 1887 |
| VII. | Augustine: Homilies on the Gospel of John, Homilies on the First Epistle of John, Soliloquies Tractates on John (124 tractates). Ten Homilies on the First Epistle of John. Two Books of Soliloquies. | 1888 |
| VIII. | Augustine: Expositions on the Book of Psalms | 1888 |
| IX. | John Chrysostom: On the Priesthood, ascetic Treatises, Select Homilies and Letters, Homilies on the Statues Treatise on the Priesthood. An Exhortation to Theodore After His Fall. Letter I. Letter II. Letter to a Young Widow. Homilies on S. Ignatius and S. Babylas. Eulogy. On the Holy Martyr, S. Babylas. Concerning Lowliness of Mind. Instructions to Catechumens. Three Homilies Concerning the Power of Demons. Against Marcionists and Manichaeans. Homily on the Paralytic Let Down Through the Roof. To Those Who Had Not Attended the Assembly. Homily Against Publishing the Errors of the Brethren. On Eutropius, Patrician and Consul. Two Homilies on Eutropius. A Treatise to Prove that No One Can Harm the Man Who Does Not Injure Himself. Letters to Olympias. To Castus, Valerius, Diophantus, Cyriacus. Correspondence of St. Chrysostom, and the Church at Constantinople, with Innocent, Bishop of Rome. Homilies Concerning the Statues. | 1889 |
| X. | John Chrysostom: Homilies on the Gospel of St. Matthew | 1888 |
| XI. | John Chrysostom: Homilies on the Acts of the Apostles and the Epistle to the Romans | 1889 |
| XII. | John Chrysostom: Homilies on First and Second Corinthians | 1889 |
| XIII. | John Chrysostom: Homilies on the Epistles to the Galatians, Ephesians, Philippians, Colossians, Thessalonians, Timothy, Titus, and Philemon | 1889 |
| XIV. | John Chrysostom: Homilies on the Gospel of St. John and the Epistle to the Hebrews | 1889 |

== Nicene and Post-Nicene Fathers, Series II ==
| Vol. | Contents | First Published |
|---|---|---|
| I. | Eusebius: Church History from A.D. 1–324, Life of Constantine the Great, Oration in Praise of Constantine | 1890 |
| II. | Socrates: Church History from A.D. 305–438; Sozomenus: Church History from A.D. 323-425 | 1890 |
| III. | Theodoret, Jerome, Gennadius, Rufinus: Historical Writings, etc. | 1892 |
| IV. | Athanasius: Select Writings and Letters | 1892 |
| V. | Gregory of Nyssa: Dogmatic Treatises; Select Writings and Letters | 1893 |
| VI. | Jerome: Letters and Select Works Letters. The Life of Paulus the First Hermit. The Life of S. Hilarion. The Life of Malchus, the Captive Monk. The Dialogue Against the Luciferians. The Perpetual Virginity of Blessed Mary. Against Jovinianus. Against Vigilantius. To Pammachius Against John of Jerusalem. Against the Pelagians. Prefaces. Translations from the Septuagint and Chaldee. The Commentaries. | 1893 |
| VII. | Cyril of Jerusalem, Gregory Nazianze | 1894 |
| VIII. | Basil: Letters and Select Works | 1895 |
| IX. | Hilary of Poitiers, John of Damascus | 1899 |
| X. | Ambrose: Select Works and Letters On the Duties of the Clergy. On the Holy Spirit. On the Decease of His Brother Saytrus. Exposition of the Christian Faith. On the Mysteries. Concerning Repentance. Concerning Virgins. Concerning Widows. Selections from the Letters of St. Ambrose. Memorial of Symmachus, Prefect of the city. Sermon Against Auxentius on the Giving Up of the Basilicas. | 1896 |
| XI. | Sulpicius Severus, Vincent of Lerins, John Cassian | 1894 |
| XII. | Leo the Great, Gregory the Great | 1895 |
| XIII. | Gregory the Great II, Ephraim Syrus, Aphrahat | 1898 |
| XIV. | The Seven Ecumenical Councils | 1900 |

== See also ==
- Ante-Nicene Fathers
- Ancient Christian Writers
- The Fathers of the Church
- Jacques Paul Migne
