= Maximus of Turin =

Christian bishop, theologian, and saint (c. 380–c. 465)

Saint Maximus of Turin
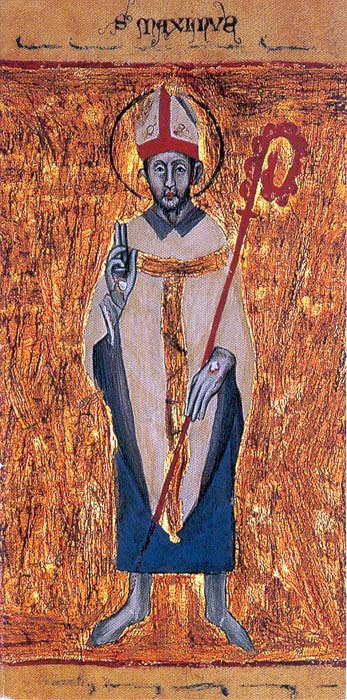
- Image of Maximus from the Codice della Catena.

Missionary
- Born: About 380
- Died: Shortly after 465 AD
- Venerated in: Catholic Church; Eastern Orthodox Church
- Feast: 25 June
- Attributes: depicted as a bishop pointing at a roe
- Patronage: Turin

Maximus of Turin (Italian: San Massimo; c. 380 – c. 465) was a Roman Christian prelate known as the first Bishop of Turin. He was a theological writer who "made a great contribution to the spread and consolidation of Christianity in Northern Italy".

== Life ==
Maximus is believed to have been a native of Rhaetia (modern-day Northern Italy). He was a disciple of Ambrose of Milan and Eusebius of Vercelli. Gennadius of Massilia described Maximus as a profound student of scripture and a learned preacher. Maximus mentions in a sermon that in 397 he witnessed, at Anaunia in the Rhaetian Alps, the martyrdom of Sisinnius, Martyrius, and Alexander, three missionary bishops, whom Ambrose had sent to assist Vigilius at Trento.

In 398 he was bishop of Turin, then a suffragan see of Milan. During his tenure, Turin was threatened with barbarian incursions; the city was filled with soldiers and refugees seeking safety behind its walls. He chided the landowners, who had fine houses in the city and estates in the country, for hiding their wealth away rather than using it to relieve the suffering of those in need. He reprimanded those who would seek to profit from the unrest and invited them instead to use their resources to redeem prisoners of war. Given the particular historical circumstances at that time, Bishop Maximus saw his role as guardian of the city. He "...governed his flock wisely and successfully in the troublous times of the Barbarian inroads into Italy".

According to Patrick Francis Moran, Maximus consecrated Saint Patrick as bishop on Patrick's return journey from Rome en route to Ireland.

== Veneration ==
=== Feast day ===
His name is in the Roman Martyrology on 25 June: "In Turin, Saint Maximus, the first bishop of this See, who with his fatherly word called crowds of pagans to the faith of Christ and guided them with heavenly doctrine to the prize of salvation."

=== Patronage ===
The city of Turin honours him as its patron saint.

=== Iconography ===
A life which, however, is entirely unreliable, was written after the 11th century, and is printed in the Acta Sanctorum, June, VII, 3rd ed., 44–46. It states that a cleric one day followed Maximus with an evil intention to a retired chapel where he often prayed. The cleric suddenly became so thirsty that he implored Maximus for help. A roe deer happened to pass which the saint caused to stop, so that the cleric could partake of its milk. This legend accounts for the fact that Maximus is represented in art as pointing at a roe deer.

== Works ==
There are about 100 of his sermons extant. His writings illustrate the customs and living conditions of the Lombard population at the time of the Gothic invasions; one homily contains the description of the destruction of Milan by Attila. Sermons 17 and 18 are addressed to the well-to-do reminding them that it is a Christian's responsibility to meet civil obligations, particularly in difficult times. With the lack of an effective civil administration, Maximus stated that it was a duty to pay taxes, regardless of how much one might prefer not to.(Sermon 26).

Other homilies are on the seasons of the ecclesiastical year and the feasts of Our Lord; 64–82. On the feast days of saints, his subject was the saint being commemorated that day. Several lessons from his homilies were inserted in the Roman Breviary.

Maximus authored numerous discourses, first edited by Bruno Bruni, and published in 1784. These consist of one hundred and eighteen homilies, one hundred and sixteen sermons, and six treatises (tractatus). Many writings, however, which Bruni ascribes to Maximus are of doubtful origin. An edition was published in the collection Corpus Christianorum Series Latina by Almut Mutzenbecher (n° XXIII, Turnhout 1962) which has accurately identified the corpus to be attributed to Maximus I of Turin.

An appendix contains writings of uncertain authorship: thirty-one sermons, three homilies, and two long epistles addressed to a sick friend. The discourses are usually very brief, and couched in forcible, though at times over flowery language. Among the many facts of liturgy and history touched on in the discourses are: abstinence during Lent (hom. 44), no fasting or kneeling at prayers during paschal time (hom. 61), fasting on the Vigil of Pentecost (hom. 62), the synod of Milan in 389 at which Jovinianus was condemned (hom. 9), the impending barbarian invasion (hom. 86–92), the destruction of the Church of Milan by the barbarians (hom. 94), various pagan superstitions still prevalent at his time (hom. 16, 100–02), and the supremacy of St. Peter (hom. 54, 70, 72, serm. 114).

== Translations ==
- Sermons of St. Maximus of Turin, translated and annotated by Boniface Ramsey, OP, 1989 (Ancient Christian Writers, 50) ISBN 9780809104239
