= Boniface Ramsey =

American Catholic priest (born 1945)

- Born: October 6, 1945 (age 80)
- Religion: Catholic, Dominican Order
- Ordained: 1973
- Offices held: professor at Immaculate Conception Seminary at Seton Hall University

J. Boniface Ramsey (born October 6, 1945) is an American Catholic priest who was ordained in 1973 as a member of the Dominican Order. From 1987 to 1996 Ramsey was a professor at Immaculate Conception Seminary at Seton Hall University.

== Life ==
From 1987 to 1996 Ramsey was a professor at Immaculate Conception Seminary (which serves the archdiocese of Newark). Ramsey was a member of the "voting faculty" that could express a formal opinion as to whether a student should be promoted to the next year. According to Ramsey, in the early 1990s, Theodore McCarrick, then Archbishop of Newark, removed Ramsey's voting prerogative because Ramsey was instrumental in the expulsion of one of the seminarians.

In November 2000, Ramsey wrote the Apostolic Nuncio in Washington, D.C., Archbishop Gabriel Montalvo, regarding rumors of inappropriate conduct on the part of McCarrick's with seminarians. (As a Dominican, rather than a diocesan priest, Ramsey was not under McCarrick's immediate supervision.) Ramsey had heard reports that the Archbishop was in the practice of inviting five seminarians to his beach house, which only had five beds, and sharing a bed with one of the seminarians. " I never heard that McCarrick touched anyone", said Ramsey.

He said that "McCarrick’s behavior was viewed by many as “odd” or even “crazy,” but not necessarily immoral...The term, ‘sexual harassment,’” had not gained currency, and the seminary administrators didn’t know how to react". Ramsey received no response from Montalvo, but a letter sent to him in October 2006 from the Vatican by Archbishop Leonardo Sandri indicated that his complaint had been received by Montalvo and been forwarded to the Vatican. Ramsey believes that between 2006 and 2015, there were those in the Vatican attempting to build a case against McCarrick. In February 2019, the same month McCarrick was laicized by the Vatican, an image of Sandri's October 11, 2006 letter of reply, which illustrates Ramsey's account of his involvement in the McCarrick affair, was published by the media, including in a Commonweal article which Ramsey himself wrote. The image showed McCarrick's name concealed in the letter as well.

In 2004 he joined the Archdiocese of New York. A further letter to Cardinal Sean O'Malley of Boston, written in June 2015, was never passed on to O'Malley. When the news broke in the summer of 2018 that McCarrick's behavior with his seminarians was known to Church authorities, not only in the Vatican but apparently also by many American bishops and others, serious questions were raised as to how he could have been named archbishop of Washington (2000) and then been elevated to the cardinalate (2001).

Ramsey is the author or translator of several books on the Fathers of the Church, notably Beginning to Read the Fathers, and of numerous articles on various theological topics. He is the general editor of The Works of Saint Augustine: A Translation for the 21st Century. Until 2024, Ramsey served as the administrator of the parish of Saint Joseph-Yorkville in Manhattan. He is now in residence at St. Rita's in Long Island City.

== Publications ==
- Beginning to Read the Fathers (Paulist Press, 1985)
- Ambrose (Routledge, 1997) ISBN 9780415118415
- (introduction) The Augustine Catechism: The Enchiridion on Faith, Hope, and Love (New City Press, 1999) ISBN 1565481240
- (introduction), Soliloquies: Augustine's Inner Dialogue (New City Press) ISBN 9781565481428
- Beginning to Read the Fathers, Revised Edition (Paulist Press, 2012) ISBN 9780809147540

=== Translations ===
- Sermons of St. Maximus of Turin, translated and annotated by Boniface Ramsey, OP, 1989 (ACW 50) ISBN 9780809104239
- Joseph Ratzinger, "In the Beginning…": A Catholic Understanding of the Story of Creation and the Fall (Eerdmans, 1995) ISBN 9780802841063
- John Cassian. The Conferences, translated and annotated by Boniface Ramsey, OP, 1997 (ACW 57) ISBN 9780809104840
- John Cassian. The Institutes, translated and annotated by Boniface Ramsey, OP, 2000 (ACW 58) ISBN 9780809105229
- Benedict XVI, The Unity of the Nations (2015) ISBN 9780813227238
