= Arcadius and companions =

Arcadius, Paschasius, Probus and Eutychius were Chalcedonian Christian martyrs. Natives of Hispania, they became loyal counsellors of the Vandal king Gaiseric, but were ultimately proscribed, exiled, tortured and executed in 437 for refusing the king's command to convert to Arianism. Their story is recounted in the contemporary chronicle of Prosper of Aquitaine. Paschasius and Eutychius, whose name is sometimes given as Eutychian, were brothers.

Prosper records that the four men were for a long time trusted as advisors by Gaiseric for their wisdom and faithfulness. They were probably Romans who had first joined Gaiseric when the Vandals were in Hispania and had then continued with him after he invaded Africa in 429. Their sudden removal from court has been described as a "purge". Prosper says that Gaiseric demanded their conversion "to make them even more esteemed". When they refused, their property was confiscated and they were sent into exile. Their place of exile is unknown, but it must have been within the Vandal kingdom. The Epistula consolatoria ad Arcadium actum in exsilium a Genserico rege Vandalorum, a letter that Bishop Honoratus of Cirta wrote to Arcadius during his exile, has survived. In it, Honoratus urges Arcadius not to waver in his faith and assures him that he will be a martyr if he were killed. According to the letter, Arcadius had a wife and children. The purged courtiers were probably killed in Africa, as per the Roman Martyrology. Their murders were almost certainly a violation of Gaiseric's treaty of 435 with Western Roman Empire.

Paschasius and Eutychius had a younger brother named Paulillus who was "very dear to the king on account of his fine body and refined nature", in the words of Prosper. He too refused to convert and was beaten and enslaved. He may have died from exposure. In the Catholic Church, the feast day of Arcadius and companions is 13 November. They are listed in the Roman Martyrology, but not the General Roman Calendar. They were the first martyrs of the Vandal persecution of Chalcedonians in Africa.

== Bibliography ==
- Conant, Jonathan (2012). Staying Roman: Conquest and Identity in Africa and the Mediterranean, 439–700. Cambridge University Press.
- Martindale, John R., ed. (1980). The Prosopography of the Later Roman Empire: Volume II, AD 395–527. Cambridge: Cambridge University Press. ISBN 0-521-20159-4.
- Mawdsley, Harry (2020). "'The Eye of God Is Watching You': Bishops and Martyrs in Vandal North Africa". Turbulent Priests.
- Merrills, Andy; Miles, Richard (2010). The Vandals. Wiley-Blackwell.
- Murray, Alexander Callander, ed. (2008). From Roman to Merovingian Gaul: A Reader. University of Toronto Press.
- Thomas, Sarah Fawcett, ed. (2000). Butler's Lives of the Saints: New Full Edition. Vol. 11 (November) (Rev. ed.). The Liturgical Press.
- Walsh, Michael J. (2007). A New Dictionary of Saints: East and West. Liturgical Press.
- Watkins, Basil (2016). The Book of Saints: A Comprehensive Biographical Dictionary (8th rev. ed.). Bloomsbury.
- Whelan, Robin (2018). Being Christian in Vandal Africa: The Politics of Orthodoxy in the Post-Imperial West. University of California Press.
