= Chromatius =

Bishop of Aquileia

Saint Chromatius
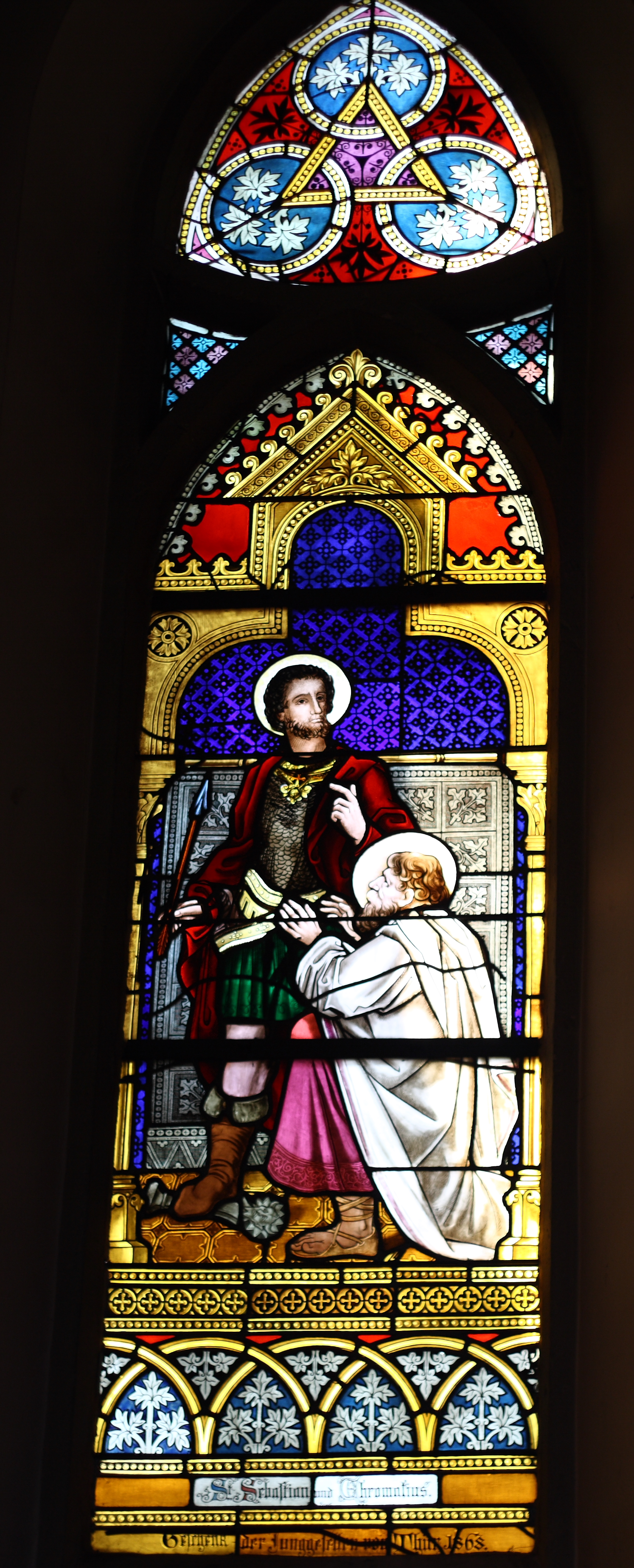
- Saint Sebastianus and Saint Chromatius

Church Father
- Born: 4th Century; Aquileia
- Died: 406/407
- Venerated in: Catholic Church; Eastern Orthodox Church
- Feast: 2 December

Chromatius (died c. 406/407 AD) was a bishop of Aquileia.

He was probably born at Aquileia, and grew up there. His father died when Chromatius was an infant. He was raised by his mother and his large group of older siblings.

== Career ==
He was ordained a priest of that church in 381 and participated in the small Synod of Aquileia organized by Ambrose of Milan. After the death of Valerianus in 388, Chromatius became bishop of Aquileia. He was one of the most celebrated prelates of his time and was in active correspondence with contemporaries Ambrose, Jerome, and Tyrannius Rufinus. He baptized Rufinus and became something of a mentor to him.

As a scholarly theologian, he urged these friends to produce learned works. Ambrose was encouraged by him to write exegetical works; Jerome dedicated to him translations and commentaries, which he had written at his suggestion (translations of the Books of Paralipomenon, Tobit, the books of Solomon, commentaries on the Prophecy of Habakkuk). Chromatius helped finance Jerome's work.

In the bitter quarrel between Jerome and Rufinus concerning Origenism, Chromatius, while rejecting the doctrines of Origen of Alexandria, attempted to make peace between the disputants. He maintained ecclesiastical communion with Rufinus and induced him not to answer the last attack of St. Jerome, but to devote himself to new literary works, especially to the translation of the Ecclesiastical History of Eusebius.

Chromatius opposed Arianism with much zeal and rooted it out in his diocese. He gave steadfast support to John Chrysostom, Archbishop of Constantinople, when he was unjustly oppressed, and wrote in his favour to Honorius, the Western emperor, who sent this letter to his brother, Arcadius. This intervention, however, proved to be of no avail.

Chromatius was also active as an exegete. Until modern times only seventeen treatises were known to be authored by him on the Gospel according to Matthew (iii, 15–17; v–vi, 24), besides a fine homily on the Eight Beatitudes (counted as an eighteenth treatise). In 1969 researcher Henri Lemarié discovered and published thirty-eight sermons.

His feast is celebrated on 2 December.

== Editions and Translations ==
- Phoebadius, Chromatius Aquileiensis, Sulpicius Severus, Innocentius I, Zosimus, Bonifatius I, Gaudentius Brixiensis, Bachiarius (Patrologia Latina 20.) Brepols Verlag; ISBN 978-2-503-10202-3.
- Raymond Étaix, Joseph Lemarié (edd.): Chromatius Aquileiensis Opera. 2 vols., Brepols, Turnhout 1974–1977 (CCSL IX A).
- Joseph Lemarié (ed.), Henri Tardif (transl.). Sermons, tome I: 1–17 (SC 154). Éditions du Cerf, 1969. ISBN 2-20403-805-9
- Joseph Lemarié (ed.), Henri Tardif (transl.). Sermons, tome II: 18–41 (SC 164). Éditions du Cerf, 1976. ISBN 978-2204038065
- Chromatius of Aquileia. Sermons and Tractates on Matthew, translated and introduced by Thomas P. Scheck, 2018 (ACW 75). ISBN 9780809106462, 9781587687228
