= Johannes Quasten =

Roman Catholic theologian (1900 – 1987)

- Born: May 3, 1900; Homberg
- Died: March 10, 1987 (aged 86); Freiburg im Breisgau
- Theological work
- Era: 20th century
- Tradition or movement: Roman Catholicism
- Main interests: Patrology

Johannes Quasten (3 May 1900 in Homberg – 10 March 1987 in Freiburg im Breisgau) was a German Catholic theologian and scholar of patristics.

== Life ==
Johannes Quasten (3 May 1900 in Homberg – 10 March 1987 in Freiburg im Breisgau) was a Roman Catholic theologian and scholar of patristics. He was the son of Wilhelm and Sibilla Quasten.

He studied Roman Catholic theology at the Westfälische Wilhelms University (Wilhelm's University of Westphalia ) in Münster. In 1926 he was ordained priest. In 1927 he earned his doctorate with F.J. Dölger in Münster with a thesis on "Music and singing in the cults of the ancient pagan and early Christian times". Further studies followed in the years 1927–1929 in Rome at the Pontificio Istituto di Archeologia Cristiana. At the same time, he served as chaplain at the Collegio Teutonico (Campo Santo Teutonico) or Teutonic Cemetery). He received a grant from the Association of German Science in the German Archaeological Institute in Rome and took part with the Görres-Gesellschaft in international excavations. He returned to Münster university in 1929 and qualified as a professor in 1931 (Habilitation).

After confrontations with the Nazi regime, he moved to Rome. The university had blocked his appointment as professor, dismissed him as assistant and finally revoked his venia legendi. Through the mediation of Clemens August Graf von Galen, and through the intercession of the Cardinal Pacelli (later Pope Pius XII), he moved to the United States of America in 1938, joined the Catholic University of America in 1938 and progressed through its ranks. He became Dean of Theology at CUA in 1945, senator in 1949, he retired in 1970.

Quasten received the Cardinal Spellman Award of the Catholic Theological Association of America in 1960. With his retirement in 1970, he was appointed Honorary Professor at the Faculty of Catholic Theology of the University of Freiburg in Breisgau.

"A tough but fair professor, Msgr. Quasten wrote prolifically about his specialty — early Christian history, liturgy, and patristics. He churned out book reviews, articles, and papers, but none compared to his magnum opus Patrology. Showcasing his expert knowledge and years spent in the field, this three-volume mammoth outlines the writings and contributions of the Early Church Fathers." The Patrology (Patrologia) series was later continued by Angelo Di Berardino, OSA, of the Patristic Institute Augustinianum in Rome.

== Johannes Quasten Award ==
The Catholic University of America, Washington D.C. offers a Johannes Quasten Award.

== Awards and honours ==
- 1948 Visiting lecturer at the Abt-Herwegen Institute for Historical Liturgical Research (Maria Laach Abbey)
- 1951 Member of the steering committee for the Patristic Conference at Oxford University
- 1960 Cardinal Spellman Award of the Catholic Theological Association of America for his Verdienste auf dem Gebiet der Theologie
- 1960 Papers and participation in the pontifical commission regarding sacred liturgy in preparation for the second Vatican Council invited by Pope John XXIII
- 1960 Member of the Oxford Historical Society
- 1964 Ernennung zum Consultor Consilii ad exsequendam Constitutionem de sacra Liturgia by Pope Paul VI
