= Honoratus Antoninus =

Honoratus Antoninus was a bishop of Constantine (Cirta) in the Roman province of Africa. He was alive during the persecution of the Catholics by the Vandal king Gaiseric (who adhered to Arianism) in the 5th century, around the year 437.

He is the author of a letter titled Epistola ad Labores pro Christo ferendos Exhortatoria, written about 437–440 to a certain Spaniard named Arcadius, previously a friend of Genseric's, who, having been banished on account of his faith, is here comforted and encouraged to endure still greater hardships. Arcadius was afterwards martyred.

The letter has been cited as evidence for Geiseric's promotion of Arianism.

== Editions and translations ==
This letter was first published by Johannes Sichardus in his Antidot. contra omnes Haereses, fol. Basil. 1528, and will be found in the Magna Bibl. Patr., fol. Colon. 1618, vol. v. p. iii., in Bibl. Patr. fol. Paris, 1644 and 1654. vol. iii., in the Bibl. Patr. Max., Lugd. fol. 1677, vol. viii. p. 665, and in Thierry Ruinart's Historia Persecutionis Vandalicae, 8vo. Paris, 1694, pt. 2.100.4. p. 433.

An English translation, with commentary, is available at http://turbulentpriests.group.shef.ac.uk/the-eye-of-god-is-watching-you-bishops-and-martyrs-in-vandal-north-africa/
