= Vigiliae Christianae =

- Discipline: Early Christian studies, archaeology
- Language: English
- Edited by: K. Greschat, J. Lössl, J. van Oort, B.D. Ehrman, G. Rouwhorst, D.T. Runia, C. Scholten

Publication details
- History: 1947-present
- Publisher: Brill Publishers
- Frequency: Quarterly

Standard abbreviations
- ISO 4: Vigiliae Christ.

Indexing
- ISSN: 0042-6032 (print); 1570-0720 (web)

Links
- Journal homepage; Online access

Vigiliae Christianae: A Review of Early Christian Life and Languages is a peer-reviewed academic journal published by Brill Publishers in the field of early Christian studies.

According to the publisher:

Vigiliae Christianae contains articles and short notes of an historical, cultural, linguistic or philological nature on early Christian literature written after the New Testament, as well as on Christian epigraphy and archaeology. Church and dogmatic history are dealt with as they relate to social history; Byzantine and medieval literature are treated as far as they exhibit continuity with the early Christian period.

The initiators of this journal were Jan Hendrik Waszink and Christine Mohrmann.

== Current editors ==
The current editors-in-chief of the Journal are:

- Katharina Greschat (Ruhr University Bochum)
- Joseph Lössl (Cardiff University)
- Johannes (Hans) van Oort (Radboud University Nijmegen)
- Bart D. Ehrman (University of North Carolina at Chapel Hill)
- G.A.M. Rouwhorst (Tilburg University)
- David T. Runia (University of Melbourne)
- Clemens Scholten (University of Cologne)

== Abstracting and indexing ==
The journal is abstracted and indexed in Academic Search, Arts & Humanities Citation Index ATLA Religion Database, Bibliography of the History of Art, Current Contents, Index Theologicus, MLA International Bibliography of Books & Articles on the Modern Languages and Literatures, and the Russian Academy of Sciences Bibliographies.
