= Christine Mohrmann =

Dutch academic (1903–1988)

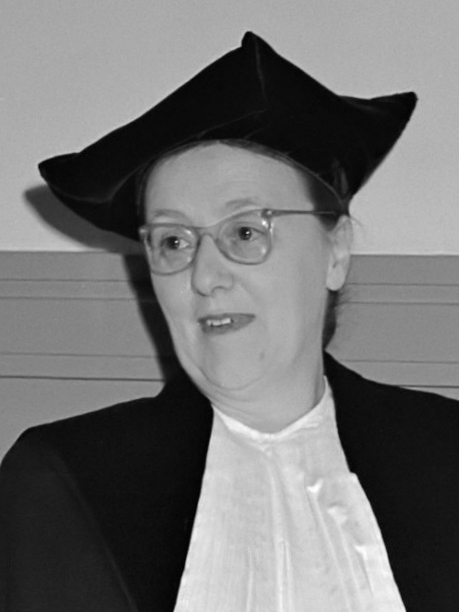
Christine Mohrmann (1953)

Christine A. E. M. Mohrmann (1 August 1903 – 13 July 1988) was a specialist in early Christian Greek and Latin and vulgar and medieval Latin who was born in Groningen and died in Nijmegen. She was honorary professor at Amsterdam University and at the Catholic University of Nijmegen (now Radboud University) where most of her teaching and research was conducted. Early researches involved her with amongst other writers Augustine, Cyprian and particularly Tertullian. She wrote mainly in Dutch, English French, German and Latin and was particularly known in the English-speaking world for her studies on St Patrick's Latin and for establishing the journal Vigiliae Christianae (1947).

== Selected works ==
- Liturgical Latin (1957)
- The Latin of Saint Patrick: Four Lectures (1961)
- Etudes sur le Latin des Chrétiens (4 volumes, Rome, 1958–77)

== Sources ==
In memoriam Christinae Mohrmann, cuius anima in pace. Drie voordrachten, uitsgespoken tijdens de herdenkingsbijeenkomst te Nijmegen op 31 maart 1989 door L.J.Engels, G.J.Bartelink en A.A.R.Bastiaensen c m., Nijmegen 1989

René Braun, NECROLOGIE, Christine Mohrmann, Cahiers de civilisation médiévale, 1989, Volume 32, Numéro 126, p. 189
