= Octavius (dialogue) =

2nd-century Latin writing on Christianity

- Author: Marcus Minucius Felix
- Language: Latin
- Genre: Dialogue
- Publisher: Various
- Publication date: 197 AD
- Publication place: Roman Empire

Octavius is an early writing in defense of Christianity by the Roman Marcus Minucius Felix. It is written in the form of a dialogue between the pagan Caecilius Natalis and the Christian Octavius Januarius, a provincial lawyer, the friend and fellow-student of the author.

== Summary ==
The scene is pleasantly and graphically laid on the beach at Ostia on a holiday afternoon, and the discussion is represented as arising out of the homage paid by Caecilius, in passing, to the Cult image of Serapis. His arguments for paganism (possibly modelled on those of Celsus) are taken up one at a time by Octavius, with the result that the assailant is convinced. Minucius himself plays the part of umpire. The form of the dialogue is modelled on the De natura deorum and De divinatione of Cicero and its style is both vigorous and elegant if at times not exempt from something of the affectation of the age.

== Analysis ==
Its style is not typical of Christian literature. If a work does not mention the doctrines of the Divine unity, the resurrection, divinization and afterlife, it has less the character of an exposition of Christianity than of a philosophical and ethical polemic against the absurdities of polytheism. While it thus has much in common with the Greek Apologies it is full of the strong common sense that marks the Latin mind. Its ultimate appeal is to the fruits of faith.

== Manuscript ==
A copy of it (which is the primary source of modern translations) can be found in the poor French manuscript of Arnobius of Sicca's Adversus nationes.

== Legacy ==
This work was referenced in 1751 by Pope Benedict XIV in his apostolic constitution 'Providas' against freemasonry by quoting Caecilius Natalis: 'Honest things always rejoice in the public, crimes are secret'.

== Editions, Translations and Commentaries ==
=== Editions ===
- Minucius Felix. Octavius. Texte établi et traduit par Jean Beaujeu. Paris: Société d'Édition «Les belles lettres», 1964.
- M. Minucii Felicis Octavius. Edidit Bernhard Kytzler. Leipzig: Teubner, 1982. 2. Auflage: Stuttgart, Teubner, 1992, ISBN 3-8154-1539-X.

=== English Translations ===
- The Octavius of Marcus Minucius Felix, translated and annotated by G.W. Clarke), 1974 (Ancient Christian Writers, 39). ISBN 9780809101894

=== Commentaries ===
- Schubert, Christoph (2014). Minucius Felix, „Octavius“. Kommentar zu frühchristlichen Apologeten, vol. 12. Freiburg: Herder, ISBN 978-3-451-29049-7.
