= Our Lord's Sermon on the Mount =

Theological text written by St. Augustine of Hippo

Our Lord's Sermon on the Mount (originally De sermone Domini in monte) is a book written by the Christian saint Augustine of Hippo in 393.

The book is a commentary on Jesus's speech known as the Sermon on the Mount, as presented in the Gospel of Matthew Chapters 5-7. Augustine considered this speech "a perfect standard of the Christian life".

Augustine wrote the book in two volumes. In the first volume he studies Chapter 5 and asks, "Is it humanely possible to put the Beatitudes into practice?" The second volume studies Chapters 6 and 7, and offers a condensed theology of prayer.
