= List of early Christian writers =

Various early Christian writers wrote gospels and other books, some of which were canonized as the New Testament canon developed. The Apostolic Fathers were prominent writers who are traditionally understood to have met and learned from Jesus's personal disciples. The Church Fathers are later writers with no direct connection to the disciples (other than the claim to apostolic succession). Early Christian apologists tried to defend Christianity against its critics, especially the Ancient Greek and Roman philosophers. Dates given, if not otherwise specified, are of their writings or bishopric, not of their lives.

- Paul of Tarsus, "Apostle to the Gentiles", earliest New Testament author 45~65
- Four Evangelists, traditionally identified as the authors of the canonical gospels 60~125
- Ignatius, bishop of Antioch, apostolic father 68~107
- Marcion of Sinope, evangelist and theologian, founder of Marcionism, published the first known canon of the New Testament, 85~160
- Clement of Rome, bishop of Rome, apostolic father 88~101
- Papias, bishop of Hierapolis, apostolic father 110~130
- Polycarp of Smyrna, bishop of Smyrna, apostolic father 110~160
- Aristides of Athens, apologist ~120
- Justin Martyr, church father ~165
- Melito of Sardis, bishop of Sardis, ~180
- Irenaeus, bishop of Lyon, disciple of Polycarp, apologist 180~202
- Origen of Alexandria, 185~254, Neoplatonist, controversial during his lifetime, posthumously condemned at the Second Council of Constantinople in 553
- Tatian, pupil of Justin Martyr, ascetic theologian ~185
- Athenagoras of Athens, philosopher, apologist ~190
- Polycrates, bishop of Ephesus, excommunicated by Victor I of Rome over the Easter controversy ~196
- Montanus, self-proclaimed prophet and founder of Montanism, last quarter of 2nd century CE
- Tertullian, church father, apologist, first Christian writer in Latin, later a Montanist 197~230
- Hippolytus, church father, sometimes termed the first Antipope, reconciled with the church and died a martyr 217~236
- Cyprian, bishop of Carthage, martyr 218~258
- Clement of Alexandria, church father, Bishop of Alexandria ~220
- Novatian, a rigorist and Antipope in 251
- Dionysius, patriarch of Alexandria, pope of the Coptic Orthodox Church 248~264
- Paul of Samosata, bishop of Antioch, adoptionist, condemned at 269 Council of Antioch
- Athanasius of Alexandria, c. 297~373, patriarch of Alexandria, defender of the Trinitarian doctrine
- Donatus Magnus, bishop of Carthage, (+355), leader of the Donatists from 313
- Lactantius, apologist ~317
- Arnobius, apologist ~330
- Eusebius, wrote History of the Church ~325
- Augustine of Hippo, 354-430, Latin church father, wrote Confessions and City of God

== See also ==
- List of Church Fathers
- New Testament apocrypha
