= Fontes Christiani =

Fontes Christiani is a widely cited German bilingual collection of patristic and medieval Latin works with modern German translations. Published initially by Herder, a long-established German theological publisher beginning in 1988, it has been published by the Belgian company Brepols, a major specialized academic publisher in the humanities but now appears to have reverted to Herder. 100 texts have so far been published (with in 2009 the appearance of a volume of mainly fourth century selected texts devoted to issues of monotheism and tolerance), of which 36 were edited by Herder.

The texts which have appeared cover a wide range of authors including on a random selection Irenaeus of Lyons, Tertullian, Origen of Alexandria, Aphrahat, Gregory of Nazianzus, Ambrose, Gregory of Nyssa, Theodore of Mopsuestia, Cassiodorus, John Philopon, Abelard, Rupert of Deutz. These are intended to be appropriate for individual purchasers as well as research libraries.

The editorial responsibility is taken by the "Verein zur Förderung der „Fontes Christiani“ e. V.", the Fontes Christiani Institute in Bochum.

== Reviews ==
- G Gould - ''The Journal of Theological Studies'', 2004
- CTR Hayward - ''The Journal of Theological Studies'', 2005
- LR Wickham - ''The Journal of Theological Studies'', 2005
