= Arnobius =

Christian apologist

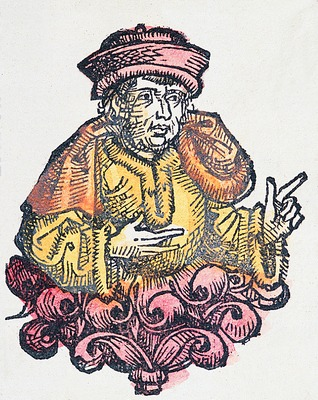
- Died: c. 330; Ancient Rome
- Other names: Arnobius the Elder, Arnobius Afer, Arnobius of Sicca
- Occupations: Theologian, writer

Philosophical work
- Era: Roman philosophy
- Region: Western philosophy
- Main interests: Apologetics; Rhetoric; Theology
- Notable works: Adversus nationes
- Notable ideas: Early form of the Pascal's Wager

Arnobius (Note: To distinguish him from a later Arnobius (Arnobius the Younger), of the fifth century, he is sometimes called Arnobius the Elder, Arnobius Afer, or Arnobius of Sicca.) (died c. 330) was an early Christian apologist of Berber origin during the reign of Diocletian (284–305).

According to Jerome's Chronicle, Arnobius, before his conversion, was a distinguished Numidian rhetorician at Sicca Veneria (El Kef, Tunisia), a major Christian center in Proconsular Africa, and owed his conversion to a premonitory dream. However, Arnobius writes dismissively of dreams in his surviving book.

According to Jerome, to overcome the doubts of the local bishop as to the earnestness of his Christian belief he wrote (c. 303, from evidence in IV:36) an apologetic work in seven books, which St. Jerome calls Adversus gentes but which is entitled Adversus nationes in the only (9th-century) manuscript that has survived. Jerome's reference, his remark that Lactantius was a pupil of Arnobius and the surviving treatise are the only known facts about Arnobius that have been transmitted.

== Adversus nationes ==
Adversus nationes was composed in response to arguments justifying Diocletian's persecution of Christians by claiming that Christians had brought the wrath of the gods on Ancient Rome.

Arnobius, whom Revilo P. Oliver describes as "a practitioner of the turgid and coarse style that is called African", is a vigorous apologist for Christianity. He holds the heathen gods to be real beings, but subordinate to the supreme Christian God. He also affirms that the human soul (Book II, 14 - 62) is not the work of God, but of an intermediate being, and is not immortal by nature, but capable of putting on immortality as a grace. Arnobius argues that a belief in the soul's immortality would tend to remove moral restraint, and have a prejudicial effect on human life.

Never specifically identifying his pagan adversaries, some of whom may be straw men, set up to be demolished, Arnobius argues in defence of monotheism, Christianity (deus princeps, deus summus), and the divinity of Christ. He praises Christianity's rapid diffusion, credits it with civilizing barbarians, and describes it as being in consonance with Platonism.

In order to argue against paganism and idolatry, Arnobius goes into significant detail about pagan worship, drawing on sources such as Cornelius Labeo. In books III through V, he describes temples, idols, and the Graeco-Roman cult practice of his time; in books VI and VII, sacrifices and the worship of images.

In book 2 section 4 of Adversus nationes, Arnobius gives the first known version of the argument later called Pascal's Wager, that in case of doubt about religion one should commit to it because of the rewards of doing so and risks of not doing so. He argues:

Since, then, the nature of the future is such that it cannot be grasped and comprehended by any anticipation, is it not more rational, of two things uncertain and hanging in doubtful suspense, rather to believe that which carries with it some hopes, than that which brings none at all? For in the one case there is no danger, if that which is said to be at hand should prove vain and groundless; in the other there is the greatest loss, even the loss of salvation, if, when the time has come, it be shown that there was nothing false in what was declared.

Arnobius' work appears to have been written when he was a recent convert, for he does not possess a particularly extensive knowledge of Scripture. He knows nothing of the Old Testament, and in the New only the life of Christ, though he does not quote directly from the Gospels. He was much influenced by Lucretius and had read Plato. His statements concerning Greek and Roman mythology are based respectively on the Protrepticus of Clement of Alexandria, and on Cornelius Labeo, who belonged to the preceding generation and attempted to restore Neoplatonism.

The Adversus nationes survived in a single ninth-century manuscript in Paris (and a bad copy of it in Brussels). The Paris manuscript also contains the Octavius of Marcus Minucius Felix.
