= Enchiridion on Faith, Hope and Love =

Book by Augustine of Hippo

The Enchiridion on Faith, Hope and Love (Latin: Enchiridion de fide, spe et caritate) is a compact treatise on Christian piety written by Augustine of Hippo in response to a request by an otherwise unknown person, named Laurentius, shortly after the death of Saint Jerome in 420. It is intended as a model for Christian instruction or catechesis.

As the title indicates, the work is organized according to the three graces necessary for the Christian worship of God: Faith, Hope and Love. Under Faith, Augustine explains the use of the Apostles' Creed, in teaching Christian doctrine and in refuting heresies. Under Hope, he briefly explains the Lord's Prayer as a model of Christian prayer. The final part is a discourse on Christian love.
