= Marcus Minucius Felix =

Latin-language writer

Marcus Minucius Felix (died c. AD 250 in Rome) was a Roman legal practitioner and one of the earliest Latin apologists for Christianity.

== Biography ==
Nothing is known of his personal history, and even the date at which he wrote can be only approximately ascertained as between AD 150 and 270. The name of Marcus Minucius Felix indicates his association with the gens Minucia.

=== Causidicus ===
Minucius held the title causidicus as a legal practitioner. A causidicus (literally "case-speaker") was a courtroom advocate whose primary job was to deliver oral arguments before a judge or tribunal. Roman law mandated a sharp division of labor. The iurisconsultus (jurist) provided the theoretical legal framework and opinions, while the causidicus provided the rhetoric and performance. By AD 200, the term often carried a slightly derogatory or "working-class" connotation compared to the title of advocatus. While an advocatus was seen as a distinguished friend or patron, the causidicus was viewed as a paid professional — a "hired tongue." Despite the low social status assigned by the elite, they were the backbone of the legal system. By this period, Cincian Law (which originally banned legal fees) was largely bypassed; causidici operated for profit, though fees were legally capped.

Jerome's De Viris Illustribus No. 58 speaks of him as "Romae insignis causidicus" [one of Rome's notable solicitors], but in that he is probably only improving on the expression of Lactantius who speaks of him as "non ignobilis inter causidicos loci" [not unknown among solicitors of the place].

=== Writings: Octavius ===
He is known for his Octavius, a dialogue on Christianity between the pagan Caecilius Natalis and the Christian Octavius Januarius. Written for educated non-Christians, the arguments are borrowed chiefly from Cicero, especially his De natura deorum ("Concerning the Nature of the Gods"), and Christian material, mainly from the Greek Apologists.

The Octavius is earlier than Cyprian's Quod idola dei non-sint, which borrows from it; how much earlier can be determined only by settling its relation to Tertullian's Apologeticum.

The name Caecilius Natalis contains the nomen Caecilius and cognomen Natalis, which may refer to the gens Caecilia, a plebeian family at Rome. The name Octavius Januarius, on the other hand, contains the nomen Octavius and cognomen Januarius, which may refer to the gens Octavia – the family name of Emperor Augustus.

=== Stoic Influence ===
The causidici used rhetoric influenced by Stoicism. Both Stoicism and his work as cusidici influenced him to adopt a more legal language. Minucius Felix represents a specific shift in early Christianity. While earlier writers were often hostile to pagan culture, Minucius used the Sophistic method to make Christianity "respectable" to the Roman elite. The aim was to convince the opponents that Christianity was not a "superstition" but a "true philosophy". He treated the accusations against Christians (incest, cannibalism) not as theological errors, but as libelous evidence that must be debunked through cross-examination and logical refutation in a trial format. His education would have focused on rhetorics and performance of the Second Sophists and become a rhetor (a practitioner of rhetoric in the Forum, as opposed to lower status grammaticus, teacher of rhetorics). The causidicis followed Cicero’s model, which prioritized humanitas (broad culture) and eloquentia (eloquence). He would not have studied Roman Law directly, but hired a pragmaticus to look it up. All this is evident in Octavia. The text is a masterpiece of rhetorical strategy. He uses argumentatio and refutatio — tools specifically taught by the rhetor — to dismantle pagan objections. As Rhetor he would have functioned as a "professor", with pupils and followers (sectatores) who listened to his lectures and followed him to the Forum.
