= Protestantism =

Major branch of Christianity

Protestantism is a form of Christianity (Note: Protestantism is typically classified as a division of Western Christianity defined by opposition to the Catholic Church, though Eastern Protestant denominations have developed in protest of the Orthodox Church instead.) that originated in the Protestant Reformation. It emphasizes justification of sinners through faith alone, the teaching that salvation comes by unmerited divine grace, the priesthood of all believers, and the Bible as the sole infallible source of authority for Christian faith and practice. The five solæ summarize the basic theological beliefs of mainstream Protestantism.

Protestants follow the theological tenets of the Protestant Reformation, a movement that began in the 16th century with the goal of reforming the Catholic Church from perceived errors, abuses, and discrepancies. (Note: Some movements such as the Hussites or the Lollards are also considered Protestant today, although their origins date back to centuries before the launch of the Reformation. Others, such as the Waldensians, were later incorporated into another branch of Protestantism; in this case, the Reformed branch.) The Reformation began in the Holy Roman Empire (Note: Especially in German contexts, Saxony is often described as the "motherland of the Reformation" (German: Mutterland der Reformation).) in 1517, when Martin Luther published his Ninety-five Theses as a reaction against abuses in the sale of indulgences by the Catholic Church, which purported to offer the remission of the temporal punishment of sins to their purchasers. Luther's statements questioned the Catholic Church's role as negotiator between people and God, especially when it came to the indulgence arrangement, which in part granted people the power to purchase a certificate of pardon for the penalization of their sins. Luther argued against the practice of buying or earning forgiveness, claiming instead that salvation is a gift God gives to those who have faith.

Lutheranism spread from Germany (Note: At the time Germany and the surrounding region was fragmented into numerous states of the Holy Roman Empire. Areas which turned Protestant were primarily located in northern, central and eastern areas of the Empire.) into Denmark–Norway, Sweden, Finland, Livonia, and Iceland. Calvinist churches spread in Germany, (Note: Several states of the Holy Roman Empire adopted Calvinism, including the County Palatine of the Rhine.) Hungary, the Netherlands, Scotland, Switzerland, France, Poland and Lithuania, led by Protestant Reformers such as John Calvin, Huldrych Zwingli and John Knox. The political separation of the Church of England from the Catholic Church under King Henry VIII began Anglicanism, bringing England and Wales into this broad Reformation movement, under the leadership of reformer Thomas Cranmer, whose work forged Anglican doctrine and identity. (Note: For further information, see English Reformation. In this article, Anglicanism is considered a branch of Protestantism as a part of movements derived directly from the 16th century Reformation. While today the Church of England often considers itself to be a via media between Protestantism and the Catholic Church, until the rise of the Oxford Movement in the 1830s the church generally considered itself to be Protestant. (Neill, Stephen. Anglicanism Pelican 1960, pp. 170, 259–260))

Protestantism is divided into various denominations on the basis of theology and ecclesiology. Protestants adhere to the concept of an invisible church, in contrast to the Catholic, the Eastern Orthodox Church, the Oriental Orthodox Churches, the Assyrian Church of the East, and the Ancient Church of the East, which all understand themselves as the only original church—the "one true church"—founded by Jesus Christ (though certain Protestant denominations, including historic Lutheranism, hold to this position). A majority of Protestants (Note: In 2011, the Pew Research Center estimated that there were 800,640,000 Protestants. Of these, 61.8%, or 494,795.520 people, were members of the largest Protestant denominational families. This includes: 10.8 Historical pentecostal churches (86,469,120 people),10.6% (84,867,840 people) Anglican, 9.7% (77,662,080 people) Lutheran, 9% (72,057,600 people) Baptist, 7.5% (60,048,000 people) Presbyterian/Reformed/Congregational (7% Presbyterian/Reformed, or 56,044,800 people and 0.5%, or 4,003,200 people, Congregational), 7.2% (57,646,080 people) United Church, 3.4% (27,221,760 people) Methodist, 2.7% (21,617,280 people) Adventist, 0.5% (4,003,200 people) Brethren, 0.3% (2,401,920 people) Salvation Army and 0.1% (80,0640 people) Moravians.) are members of a handful of Protestant denominational families; Anglicans/Episcopalians, Baptists, Calvinist/Reformed, (Note: This branch was first called Calvinism by Lutherans who opposed it, but many find the word Reformed to be more descriptive. It includes Presbyterianism, Congregationalism, many of united and uniting churches, as well as historic Continental Reformed churches in France, Switzerland, the Netherlands, Germany, Hungary, and elsewhere.) Lutherans, Methodists and Moravians. Furthermore, Adventists, Pentecostals, Quakers, Plymouth Brethren, independent churches also known as Nondenominational Christianity, and Charismatic Christianity can also be considered part of Protestantism broadly speaking. Independent/Non-Denominational churches are on the rise, having recently expanded rapidly throughout much of the world. These various movements, collectively labeled "popular Protestantism" (Note: A flexible term; defined as all forms of Protestantism with the notable exception of the historical denominations deriving from the Protestant Reformation.) by scholars such as Peter L. Berger, have been called one of the contemporary world's most dynamic religious movements.

Historically speaking however, Protestantism includes only the denominations that emerged directly during the Protestant Reformation, thus excluding any denomination that emerged after this period. In 2004, Hans Hillerbrand estimated a total Protestant population of 833,457,000, while the World Christian Database estimated 637,856,000 Protestants and 426,370,000 Independents (mostly non-denominational Pentecostals who do not self-identify as Protestants) in early 2026.

== Terminology ==
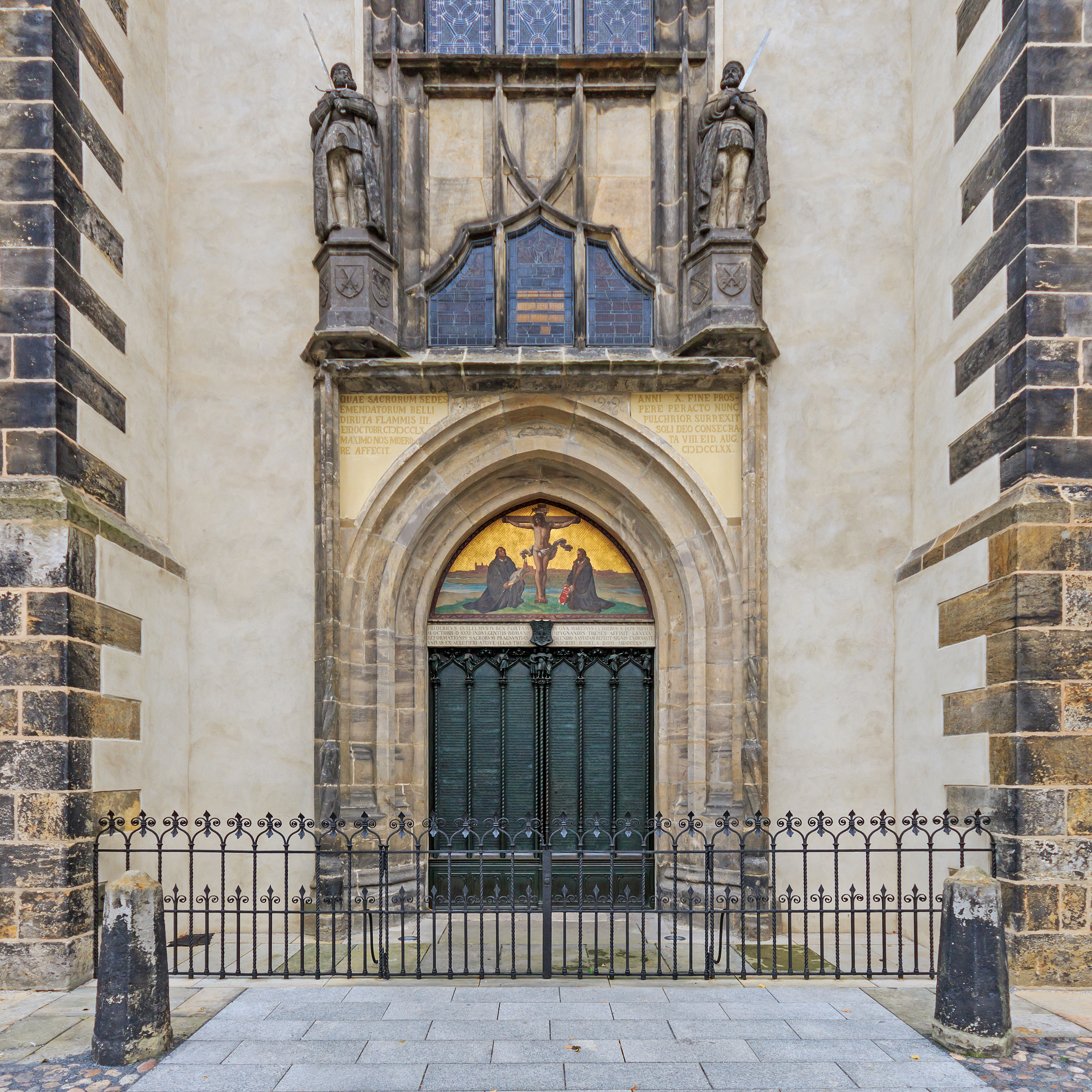
The door to All Saints' Church in Wittenberg, where Martin Luther posted his Ninety-five Theses in 1517 detailing his concerns with what he saw as the Catholic Church's abuse and corruption. The original door was destroyed by a fire, and in 1857, King Frederick William IV of Prussia ordered that a replacement be made.

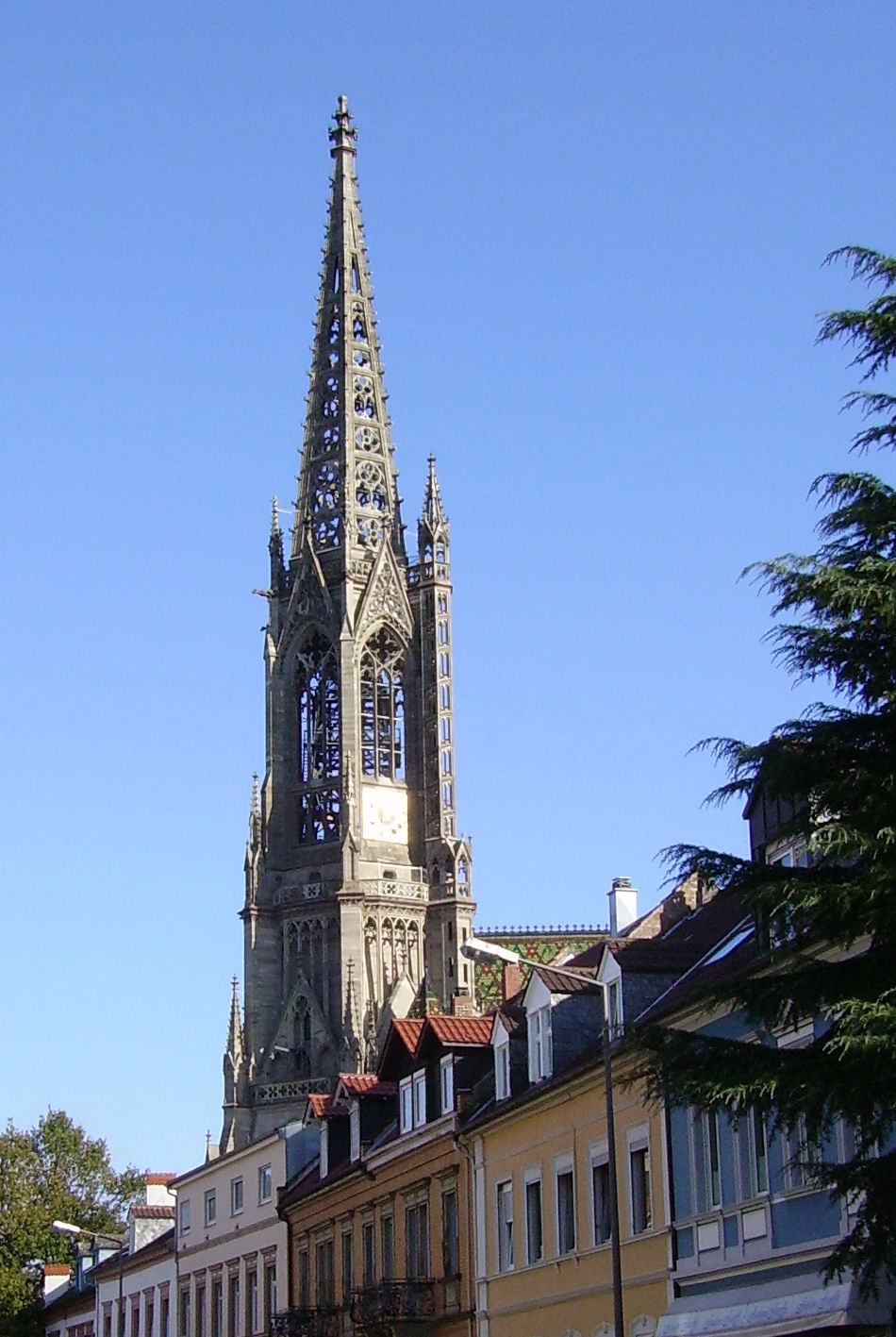
Memorial Church, finished and consecrated in 1904 in Speyer, Germany, commemorates the Protestation.

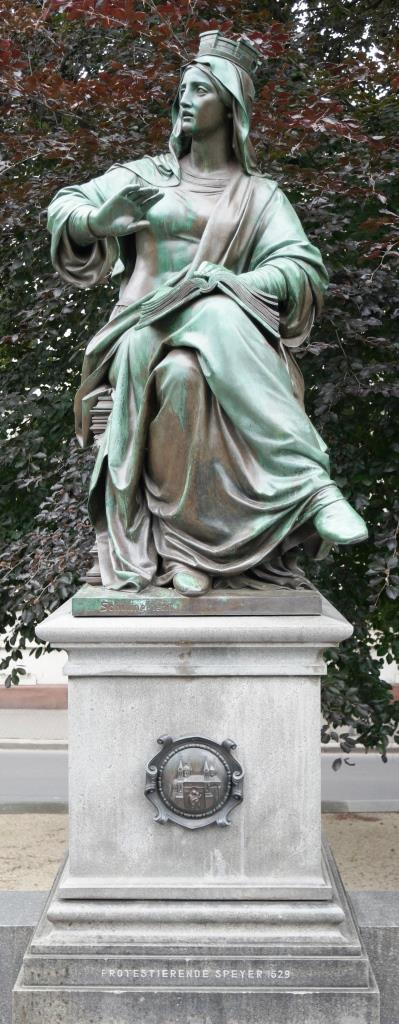
The Protesting Speyer, part of the Luther Monument in Worms, Germany

Six princes of the Holy Roman Empire and rulers of fourteen Imperial Free Cities, who issued a protest (or dissent) against the edict of the Diet of Speyer (1529), were the first individuals to be called Protestants. The term protestant, though initially purely political in nature, later acquired a broader sense, referring to a member of any Western church which subscribed to the main Protestant principles. A Protestant is an adherent of any of those Christian bodies that separated from the Church of Rome during the Reformation, or of any group descended from them.

During the Reformation, the term protestant was hardly used outside of German politics. People who were involved in the religious movement used the word evangelical (German: evangelisch). Gradually, protestant became a general term, meaning any adherent of the Reformation in the German-speaking area. It was ultimately somewhat taken up by Lutherans, even though Martin Luther himself insisted on Christian or evangelical as the only acceptable names for individuals who professed faith in Christ. French and Swiss Protestants instead preferred the word reformed, which became a popular, neutral, and alternative name for Calvinists.

The word evangelical, which refers to the gospel, was widely used for those involved in the religious movement in the German-speaking area beginning in 1517. Evangelical is still preferred among some of the historical Protestant denominations in the Lutheran, Calvinist, and United (Lutheran and Reformed) Protestant traditions in Europe, and those with strong ties to them. Above all the term is used by Protestant bodies in the German-speaking area, such as the Protestant Church in Germany. Thus, the German word evangelisch means Protestant, while the German evangelikal, refers to churches shaped by Evangelicalism. The English word evangelical usually refers to evangelical Protestant churches, and therefore to a certain part of Protestantism rather than to Protestantism as a whole. The English word traces its roots back to the Puritans in England, where Evangelicalism originated, and then was brought to the United States.

Martin Luther always disliked the term Lutheran, preferring the term evangelical, which was derived from euangelion, a Greek word meaning "good news" (i.e. "gospel"). The followers of John Calvin, Huldrych Zwingli, and other theologians linked to the Reformed tradition, also began to use that term. To distinguish the two evangelical groups, others began to refer to the two groups as Evangelical Lutheran and Evangelical Reformed. Lutherans themselves began to use the term Lutheran in the middle of the 16th century, in order to distinguish themselves from other groups such as the Philippists and Calvinists.

The German word reformatorisch, which roughly translates to English as "reformational" or "reforming", is used as an alternative for evangelisch in German, and is different from English reformed (German: reformiert), which refers to churches shaped by ideas of John Calvin, Huldrych Zwingli, and other Reformed theologians. Derived from the word "Reformation", the term emerged around the same time as Evangelical (1517) and Protestant (1529).

== Theology ==
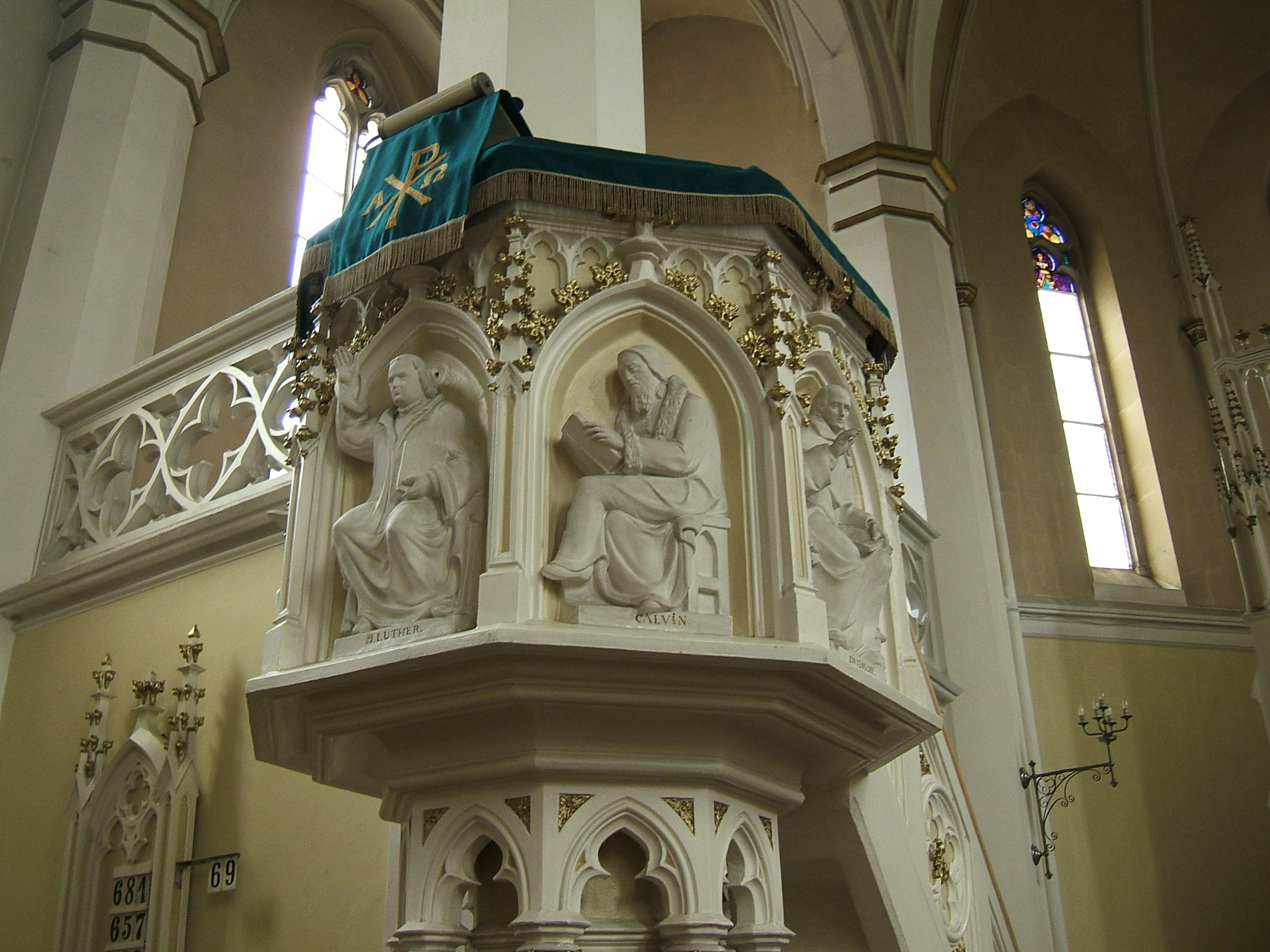
Two central figures of the Reformation, Martin Luther and John Calvin, depicted on a church pulpit; both Luther and Calvin emphasized making preaching a centerpiece of worship.

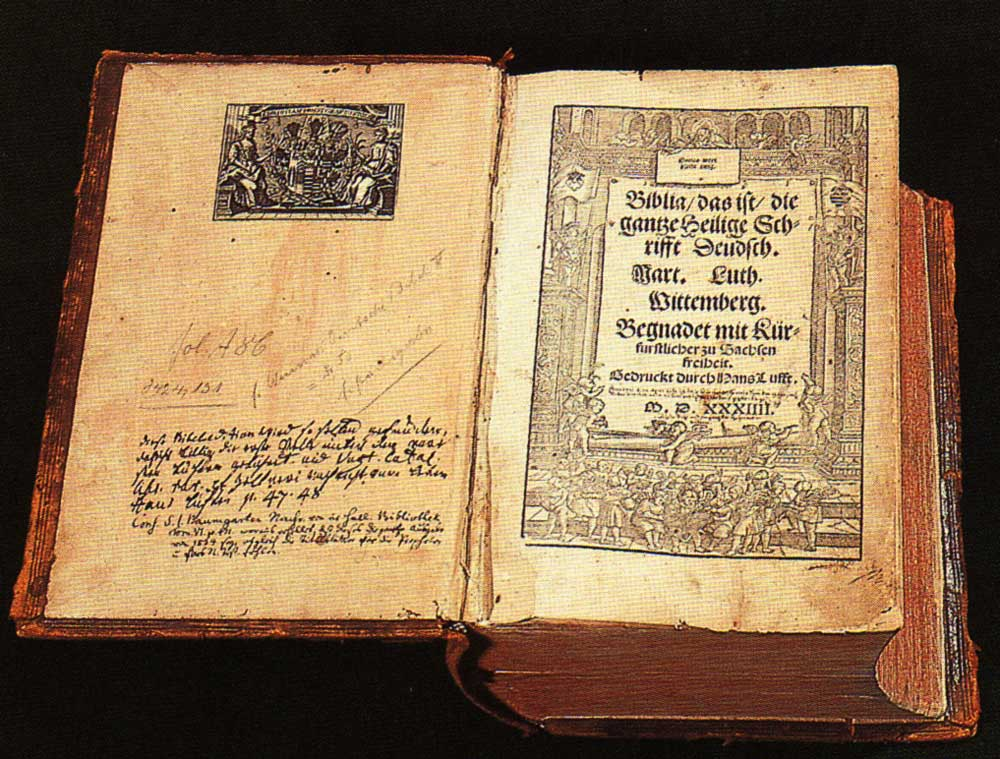
The Bible translated into vernacular by Martin Luther. In Protestantism, the Bible is the supreme authority.

Many experts have proposed criteria to determine whether a Christian denomination should be considered part of Protestantism. A common consensus approved by most of them is that if a Christian denomination is to be considered Protestant, it must acknowledge the following three fundamental principles of Protestantism.

=== Sola Scriptura ===
The belief, emphasized by Luther, in the Bible as the highest source of authority for the church. The early churches of the Reformation believed in a critical, yet serious, reading of scripture and holding the Bible as a source of authority higher than that of tradition, though Lutherans cherish tradition for its role in maintaining order and transmitting the Gospel. The many abuses that had occurred in the Western Church before the Protestant Reformation led the Reformers to reject certain Roman Catholic traditions. In the early 20th century, a less critical reading of the Bible developed in the United States—leading to a "fundamentalist" reading of Scripture. Christian fundamentalists read the Bible as the "inerrant, infallible" Word of God, as do the Catholic, Eastern Orthodox, Lutheran and Anglican churches, but interpret it in a literalist fashion without using the historical-critical method. Methodists and Anglicans differ from Lutherans and the Reformed on this doctrine as they teach prima scriptura, which holds that Scripture is the primary source for Christian doctrine, but that "tradition, experience, and reason" can nurture the Christian religion as long as they are in harmony with the Bible (Protestant canon).

Quakers and Methodists (inclusive of the holiness movement), as well as Radical Pietists, Pentecostals and Spiritual Christians emphasize the Holy Spirit and personal closeness to God.

There was also a time when scripture became the new religious imagery. Reformed (Calvinist) theology drew out iconoclastic events when John Calvin arrived in Geneva in 1536. Calvin inherited a city where the old medieval Christian world, with its rituals, images, and pilgrims were taken apart. After the events of the iconoclasm in 1566, scripture began to take place of the religious images that were previously removed. These new text images turned scripture into a visual tool. The absence of traditional images created room for the joint idea of scripture with visual objects, generating a new imagery culture that focused on reading, understanding, and reflecting over observations.

=== Justification by faith alone ===
Justification by faith alone is the belief that believers are justified, or pardoned for sin, solely through faith in Christ rather than a combination of faith and good works. For Protestants, good works are a necessary consequence rather than cause of justification. However, while justification is by faith alone, there is the position that faith is not nuda fides. John Calvin explained that "it is therefore faith alone which justifies, and yet the faith which justifies is not alone: just as it is the heat alone of the sun which warms the earth, and yet in the sun it is not alone." At the time of the justification of an individual, the Lutheran churches teach that the process of sanctification commences, which is defined as "the Holy Spirit’s work which follows justification through faith and consists of renewing the believer and bringing forth in him works of renewal." These good works done by Christians are rewarded by God. Lutheran and Reformed Christians differ from Methodists in their view of the possibility of entire sanctification, with Methodists affirming it as a second work of grace.

=== Universal priesthood of believers ===
The universal priesthood of believers implies the right and duty of the Christian laity not only to read the Bible in the vernacular, but also to take part in the government and all the public affairs of the Church. It is opposed to the hierarchical system which puts the essence and authority of the Church in an exclusive priesthood, and which makes ordained priests the necessary mediators between God and the people. It is distinguished from the concept of the priesthood of all believers, which did not grant individuals the right to interpret the Bible apart from the Christian community at large because universal priesthood opened the door to such a possibility. There are scholars who cite that this doctrine tends to subsume all distinctions in the church under a single spiritual entity. Calvin referred to the universal priesthood as an expression of the relation between the believer and his God, including the freedom of a Christian to come to God through Christ without human mediation. He also maintained that this principle recognizes Christ as prophet, priest, and king and that his priesthood is shared with his people. In this view, apostolic succession is not grounded in an unbroken chain of ordination, but in the faithfulness of believers to the Word of God, expressed in both faith and practice.

=== Trinity ===
The Trinity is the belief that God is one God in three persons: the Father, the Son (Jesus), and the Holy Spirit.

Protestants who adhere to the Nicene Creed believe in three persons (God the Father, God the Son, and the God the Holy Spirit) as one God.

Movements that emerged around the time of the Protestant Reformation, but are not a part of Protestantism (e.g. Unitarianism), reject the Trinity. This often serves as a reason for exclusion of the Unitarian Universalism, Oneness Pentecostalism, and other movements from Protestantism by various observers. Unitarianism continues to have a presence mainly in Transylvania, England, and the United States.

=== Five solae ===
The Five solae are five Latin phrases (or slogans) that emerged during the Protestant Reformation and summarize the reformers' basic differences in theological beliefs in opposition to the teaching of the Catholic Church of the day. The Latin word sola means "alone", "only", or "single".

The use of the phrases as summaries of teaching emerged over time during the Reformation, based on the overarching Lutheran and Reformed principle of sola scriptura (by scripture alone). This idea contains the four main doctrines on the Bible: that its teaching is needed for salvation (necessity); that all the doctrine necessary for salvation comes from the Bible alone (sufficiency); that everything taught in the Bible is correct (inerrancy); and that, by the Holy Spirit overcoming sin, believers may read and understand truth from the Bible itself, though understanding is difficult, so the means used to guide individual believers to the true teaching is often mutual discussion within the church (clarity). The necessity and inerrancy were well-established ideas, garnering little criticism, though they later came under debate from outside during the Enlightenment. The most contentious idea at the time though was the notion that anyone could simply pick up the Bible and learn enough to gain salvation.

The second main principle, sola fide (by faith alone), states that faith in Christ is sufficient alone for eternal salvation and justification. Though argued from scripture, and hence logically consequent to sola scriptura, this is the guiding principle of the work of Luther and later reformers. Because sola scriptura placed the Bible as the only source of teaching, sola fide epitomizes the main thrust of the teaching the reformers wanted to get back to, namely the direct, close, personal connection between Christ and the believer, hence the reformers' contention that their work was Christocentric.

The other solas, as statements, emerged later, but the thinking they represent was also part of the early Reformation.

- Solus Christus: Christ alone

The Protestants characterize the dogma concerning the Pope as Christ's representative head of the Church on earth, the concept of works made meritorious by Christ, and the Catholic idea of a treasury of the merits of Christ and his saints, as a denial that Christ is the only mediator between God and man.

- Sola Gratia: Grace alone

Protestants perceived Catholic salvation to be dependent upon both the grace of God and the merits of one's own works (as a consequence of which God's grace might be deployed). The reformers posited, in contradistinction, that salvation is a gift of God (i.e., God's free act of grace), dispensed by the Holy Spirit owing to the redemptive work of Jesus Christ alone, rather than to a subject's own works during their life. Such own works may be good, but they could not be redemptive in the sense that God's grace is redemptive ('saving').

- Soli Deo Gloria: Glory to God alone

All glory is due to God and only God, given that salvation is accomplished solely through his will and action. The reformers believed that human beings—even saints canonized by the Catholic Church, the popes, and the remainder of the ecclesiastical hierarchy—are not worthy of glory. The Catholic teaching on worshiping and glorification (vs the mere respecting or loving) of those close to but other than god was perhaps oversimplified for this purpose.

=== Christ's presence in the Eucharist ===
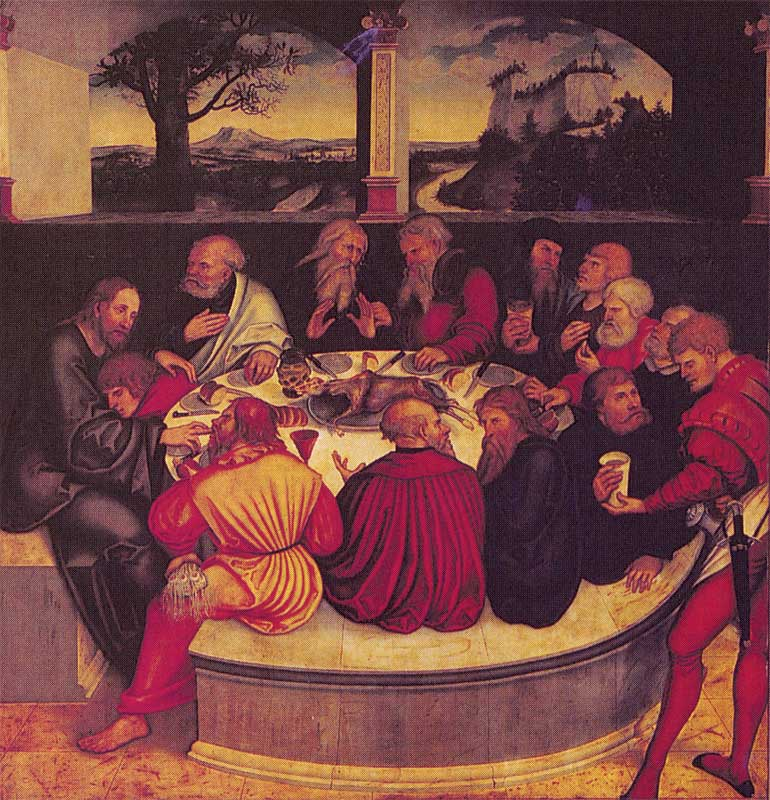
A 1547 Lutheran depiction of the Last Supper by Lucas Cranach the Elder

The Protestant movement began to diverge into several distinct branches in the mid-to-late 16th century. One of the central points of divergence was controversy over the Eucharist. Early Protestants rejected transubstantiation, the Catholic dogma of the real presence of Christ in the Eucharist explaining the "transformation from bread and wine to the body and blood of Christ". They disagreed with one another concerning the presence of Christ and his body and blood in Holy Communion, with Lutherans affirming, along with Catholics, a corporeal presence, and the Reformed affirming a real spiritual presence.

- Lutherans hold that in the Lord's Supper, the Body and Blood of Christ are corporeally present "in, with, and under the form" of bread and wine, a doctrine that the Formula of Concord calls the Sacramental union. In the Eucharist, Lutherans teach that the faithful receive "the very body and blood of Christ."
- The Reformed Churches (Continental Reformed, Presbyterian, Reformed Anglican and Congregationalist traditions) emphasize the real spiritual presence, or sacramental presence, of Christ in the Lord's Supper, holding that "Christ is 'spiritually present' in the sacrament by the ministry of the Holy Spirit and is received by faith". At the time of the Reformation, Anglicans (and consequently Methodists) inherited the Reformed view of the Eucharist as a real spiritual presence, and hold that the way that this real spiritual presence is manifested is a mystery.
- Anabaptists hold a popular simplification of the Zwinglian view, without concern for theological intricacies as hinted at above, may see the Lord's Supper merely as a symbol of the shared faith of the participants, a commemoration of the facts of the crucifixion, and a reminder of their standing together as the body of Christ (a view referred to as memorialism).

=== Other beliefs ===
Protestants reject the Catholic doctrine of papal supremacy, and have varying views on the number of true sacraments, the real presence of Christ in the Eucharist, and matters of ecclesiastical polity (church governance) and apostolic succession.

== History ==
=== Pre-Reformation ===
Spread of Lollardy in Medieval England and Medieval Scotland

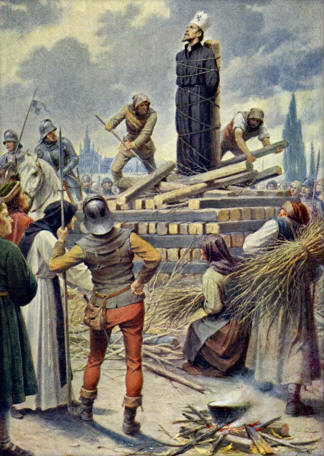
The execution of Jan Hus in 1415

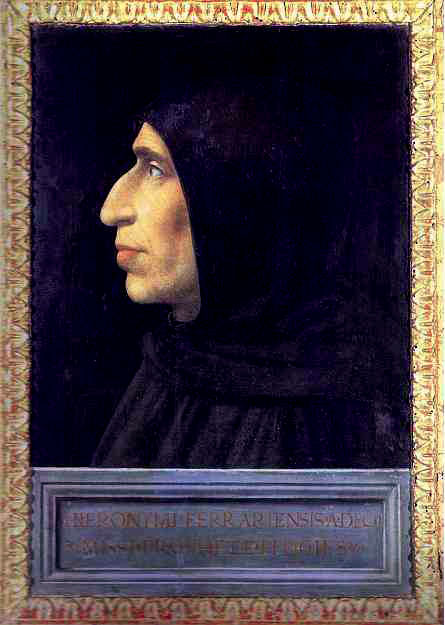
Girolamo Savonarola

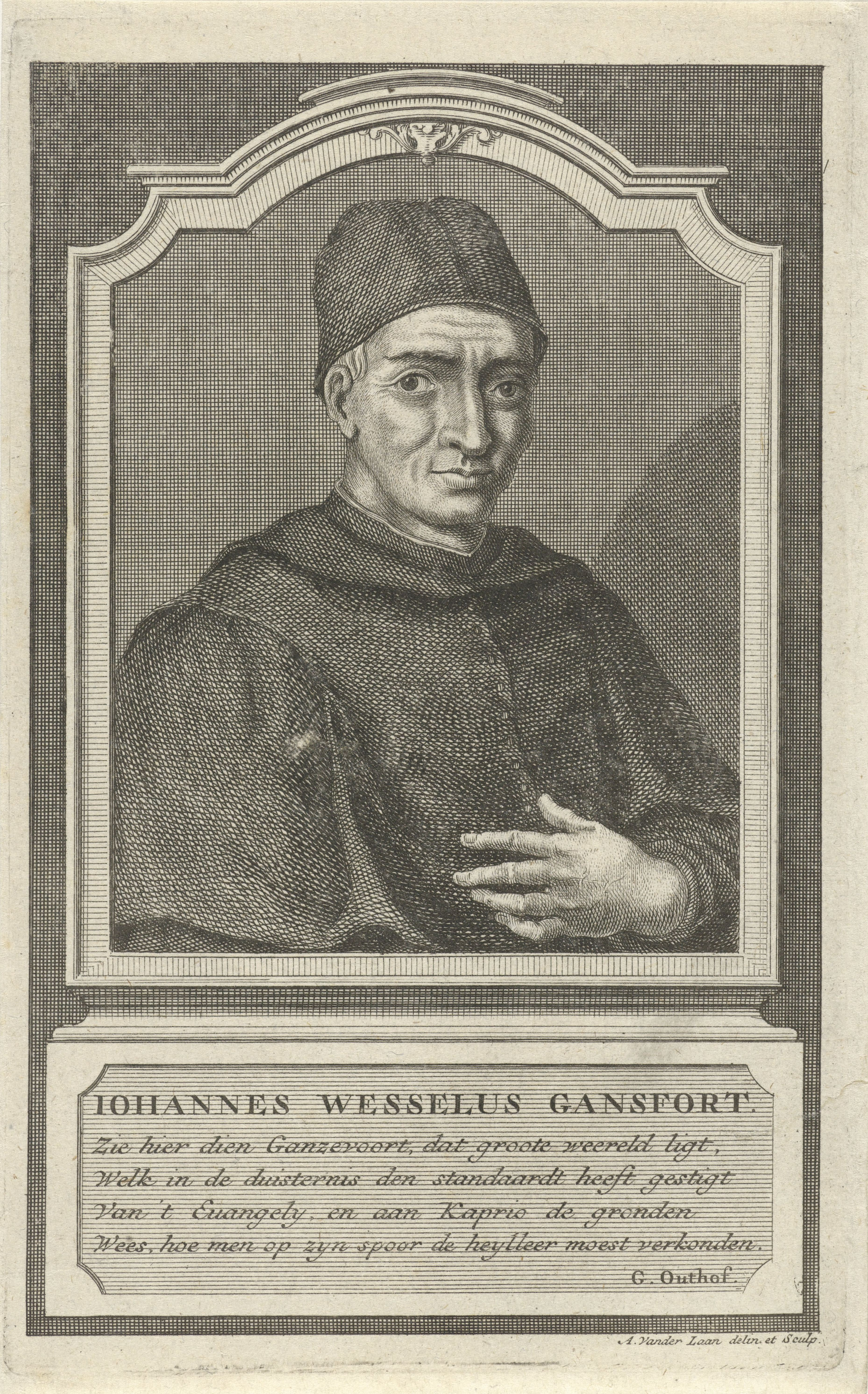
Wessel Gansfort

Many of the individual ideas that were taken up by various reformers had historical pre-cursors; however, calling them proto-reformers is controversial, as often their theology also had components that are not associated with later Protestants, or that were asserted by some Protestants but denied by others, or that were only superficially similar.

One of the earliest persons to be praised as a Protestant forerunner is Jovinian, who lived in the fourth century AD. He attacked monasticism, ascetism and believed that a saved believer can never be overcome by Satan.

In the 9th century, the theologian Gottschalk of Orbais was condemned for heresy by the Catholic Church. Gottschalk believed that the salvation of Jesus was limited and that his redemption was only for the elect. The theology of Gottschalk anticipated the Protestant reformation. Ratramnus also defended the theology of Gottschalk and denied the real presence of Christ in the Eucharist; his writings also influenced the later Protestant reformation. Claudius of Turin in the 9th century also held Protestant ideas, such as faith alone and rejection of the supremacy of Peter.

In the late 1130s, Arnold of Brescia, an Italian canon regular became one of the first theologians to attempt to reform the Catholic Church. After his death, his teachings on apostolic poverty gained currency among Arnoldists, and later more widely among Waldensians and the Spiritual Franciscans, though no written word of his has survived the official condemnation. In the early 1170s, Peter Waldo founded the Waldensians. He advocated an interpretation of the Gospel that led to conflicts with the Catholic Church. By 1215, the Waldensians were declared heretical and subject to persecution. Despite that, the movement continues to exist to this day in Italy, as a part of the wider Reformed tradition.

In the 1370s, Oxford theologian and priest John Wycliffe—later dubbed the "Morning Star of Reformation"—started his activity as an English reformer. He rejected papal authority over secular power (in that any person in mortal sin lost their authority and should be resisted: a priest with possessions, such as a pope, was in such grave sin), may have translated the Bible into vernacular English, and preached anticlerical and biblically centred reforms. His rejection of a real divine presence in the elements of the Eucharist foreshadowed Huldrych Zwingli's similar ideas in the 16th century. Wycliffe's admirers came to be known as "Lollards".

Beginning in the first decade of the 15th century, Jan Hus—a Catholic priest, Czech reformist, and professor—influenced by John Wycliffe's writings, founded the Hussite movement. He strongly advocated his reformist Bohemian religious denomination. He was excommunicated and burned at the stake in Constance, Bishopric of Constance, in 1415 by secular authorities for unrepentant and persistent heresy. After his execution, a revolt erupted. Hussites defeated five continuous crusades proclaimed against them by the Pope.

Later theological disputes caused a split within the Hussite movement. Utraquists maintained that both the bread and the wine should be administered to the people during the Eucharist. Another major faction were the Taborites, who opposed the Utraquists in the Battle of Lipany during the Hussite Wars. There were two separate parties among the Hussites: moderate and radical movements. Other smaller regional Hussite branches in Bohemia included Adamites, Orebites, Orphans, and Praguers.

The Hussite Wars concluded with the victory of Holy Roman Emperor Sigismund, his Catholic allies and moderate Hussites and the defeat of the radical Hussites. Tensions arose as the Thirty Years' War reached Bohemia in 1620. Both moderate and radical Hussitism was increasingly persecuted by Catholics and Holy Roman Emperor's armies.

In the 14th century, a German mysticist group called the Gottesfreunde criticized the Catholic church and its corruption. Many of their leaders were executed for attacking the Catholic church and they believed that God's judgement would soon come upon the church. The Gottesfreunde were a democratic lay movement and forerunner of the Reformation and put heavy stress of holiness and piety,

Starting in 1475, an Italian Dominican friar Girolamo Savonarola was calling for a Christian renewal. Later on, Martin Luther himself read some of the friar's writings and praised him as a martyr and forerunner whose ideas on faith and grace anticipated Luther's own doctrine of justification by faith alone.

Some of Hus' followers founded the Unitas Fratrum—"Unity of the Brethren"—which was renewed under the leadership of Count Nicolaus von Zinzendorf in Herrnhut, Saxony, in 1722 after its almost total destruction in the Thirty Years' War and the Counterreformation ("Catholic Reformation"). Today, it is usually referred to in English as the Moravian Church and in German as the Herrnhuter Brüdergemeine.

In the 15th century, three German theologians anticipated the reformation: Wessel Gansfort, Johann Ruchat von Wesel, and Johannes von Goch. They held ideas such as predestination, sola scriptura, and the church invisible, and denied the Catholic view on justification and the authority of the Pope, also questioning monasticism. Many protestant reformers also identified the pope as AntiChrist Some reasons as to why, include that in the canon law Decretum Gratiani Distinctio 96 Chapter "satis evideter", protestants considered the pope claiming illegitimate divine authority including the name "god" which rightly belonged to God. Some also took issue with the interpretation of canon law by some Catholics such as the canonist Zelensinus De Cassanus who wrote the phrase "Dominum Deum Nostrum Papam" or others such as "Deus in Terra" (God on earth) to refer to the pope.

Wessel Gansfort also denied transubstantiation and anticipated the Lutheran view of justification by faith alone.

=== Reformation ===
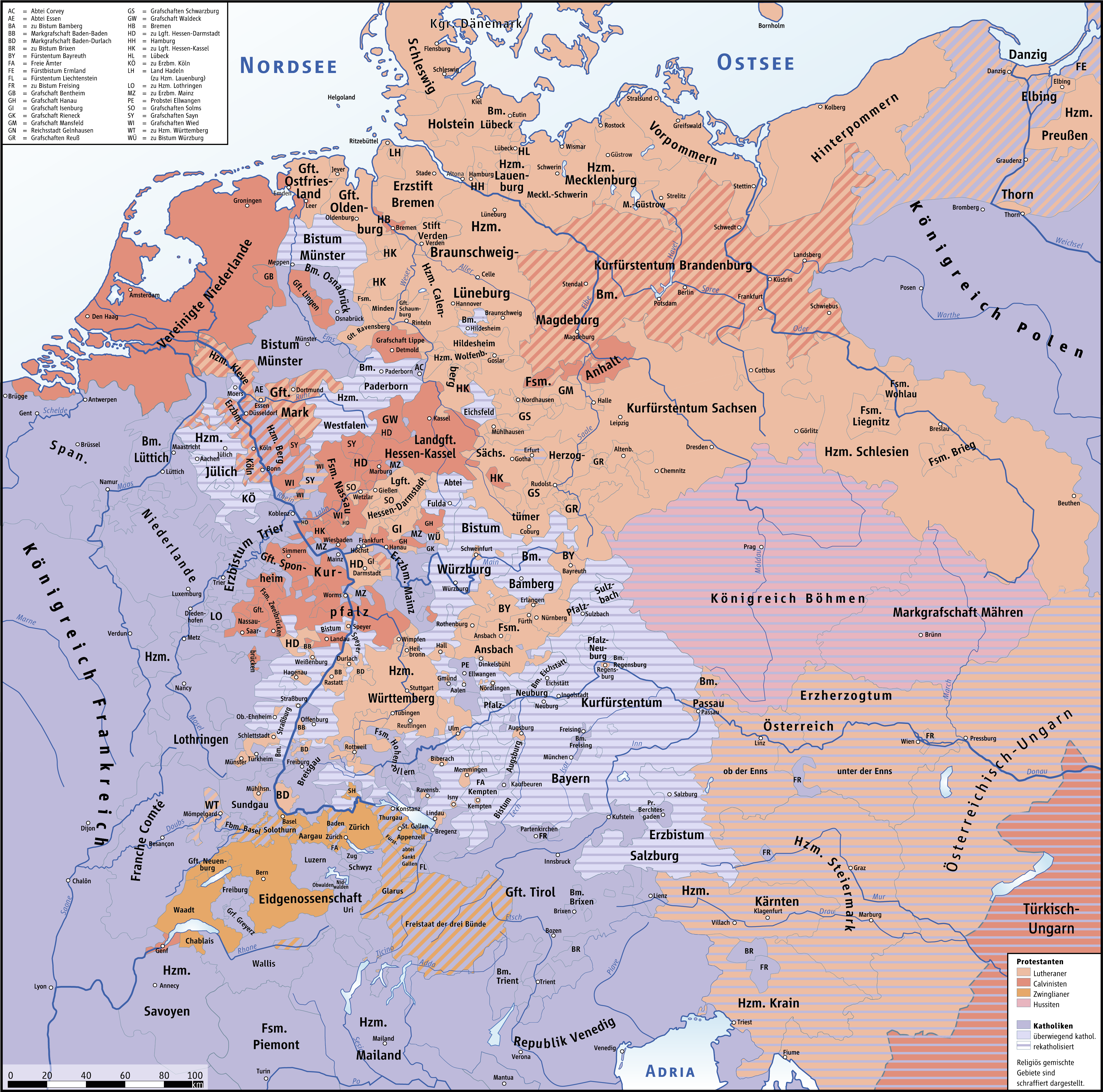
Distribution of Protestantism and Catholicism in Central Europe on the eve of the Thirty Years' War in 1618

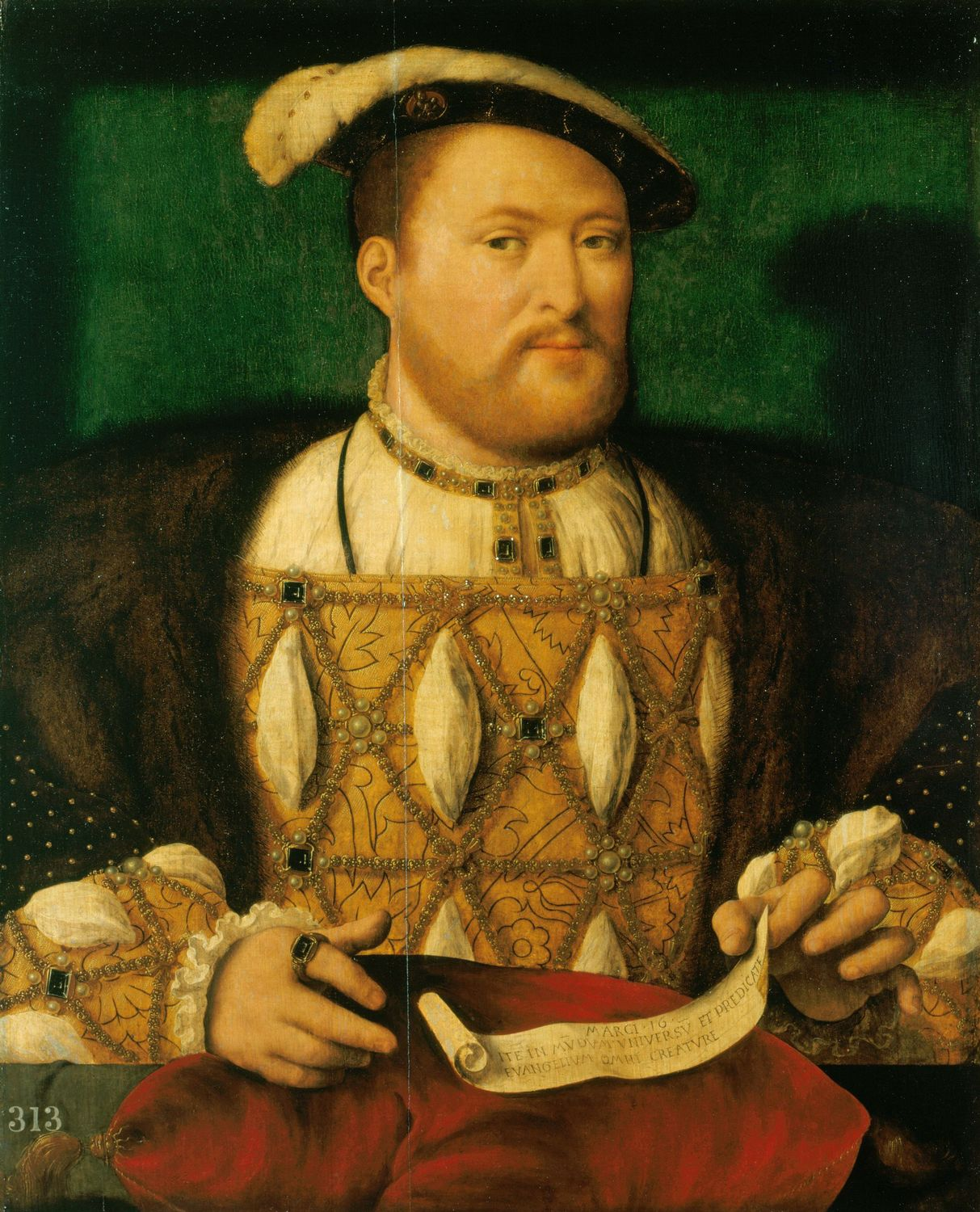
King Henry VIII, who separated the Church of England from the Catholic Church.

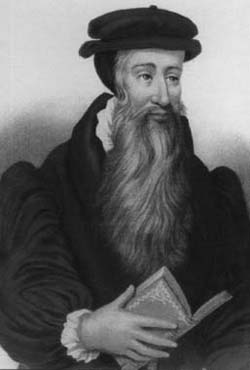
John Knox, who led the Reformation in Scotland, founding Presbyterianism

The Protestant Reformation began as an attempt to reform the Catholic Church.

On 31 October 1517, Martin Luther allegedly nailed his Ninety-five Theses, also known as the Disputation on the Power of Indulgences, on the door of the All Saints' Church in Wittenberg, Germany, detailing doctrinal and practical abuses of the Catholic Church, especially the selling of indulgences. The theses debated and criticized many aspects of the Church and the papacy, including the practice of purgatory, particular judgment, and the authority of the pope. Luther would later write works against the Catholic devotion to Virgin Mary, the intercession of and devotion to the saints, mandatory clerical celibacy, monasticism, the authority of the pope, the ecclesiastical law, censure and excommunication, the role of secular rulers in religious matters, the relationship between Christianity and the law, good works, and the sacraments.

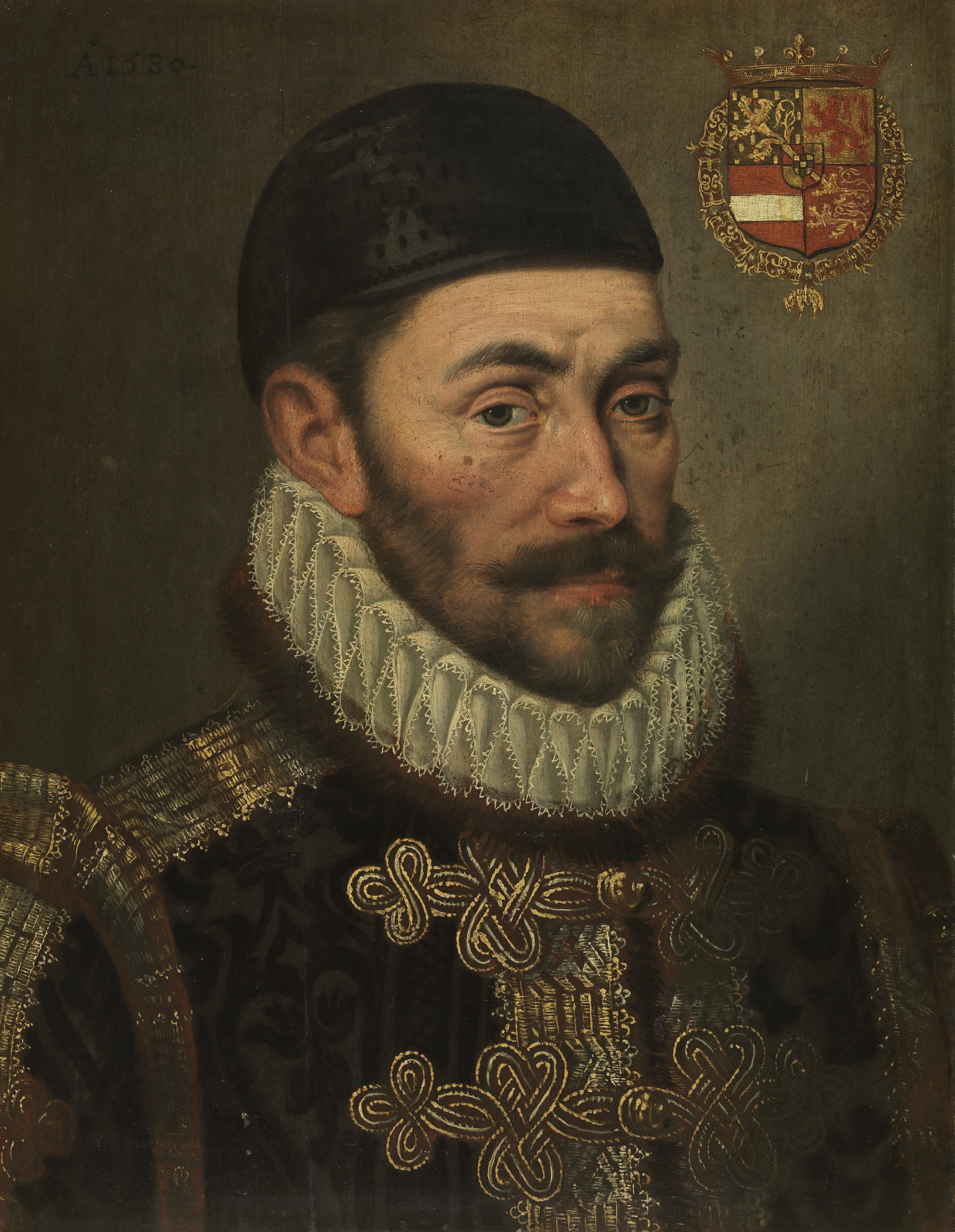
William the Silent (1533–1584, also known as William of Orange) was the leader of the Dutch Revolt in the Eighty Years' War in the Netherlands; first politically from 1559–1568, then militarily from 1568–1584. He is considered one of the most significant figures in Dutch history, known as the Father of the Fatherland, including in European history of the 16th century.

William was a stadtholder (administrator/steward) for King Philip II of Spain (1556–1598) who ruled the Low Countries (Netherlands) after his father, Charles V, Holy Roman Emperor (1519–1556) resigned. Charles V instituted the Inquisition into the Low Countries to subdue the heresies of the Protestant Reformation (according to him), as Philip II carried on his policies but with much greater motivation and gravity. He first granted Cardinal Antoine Perrenot de Granvelle (1517–1586) as head to the Inquisition and then gave the duty to Fernando Álvarez de Toledo, 3rd Duke of Alba (1507–1582) in 1567, whose oppressions resulted in the thousands of deaths and William's flight to his hometown of Dillenburg.

William developed an uprising, and returned in 1568, leading the Dutch Protestant forces against those of Catholic Spain until his assassination in 1584. The role of leader then went to his son, Maurice of Orange (1567–1625), followed by another son, Frederick Henry (1584–1647), who continued his father's vision until his death one year before the end of the Eighty Years' War and complete Dutch independence.

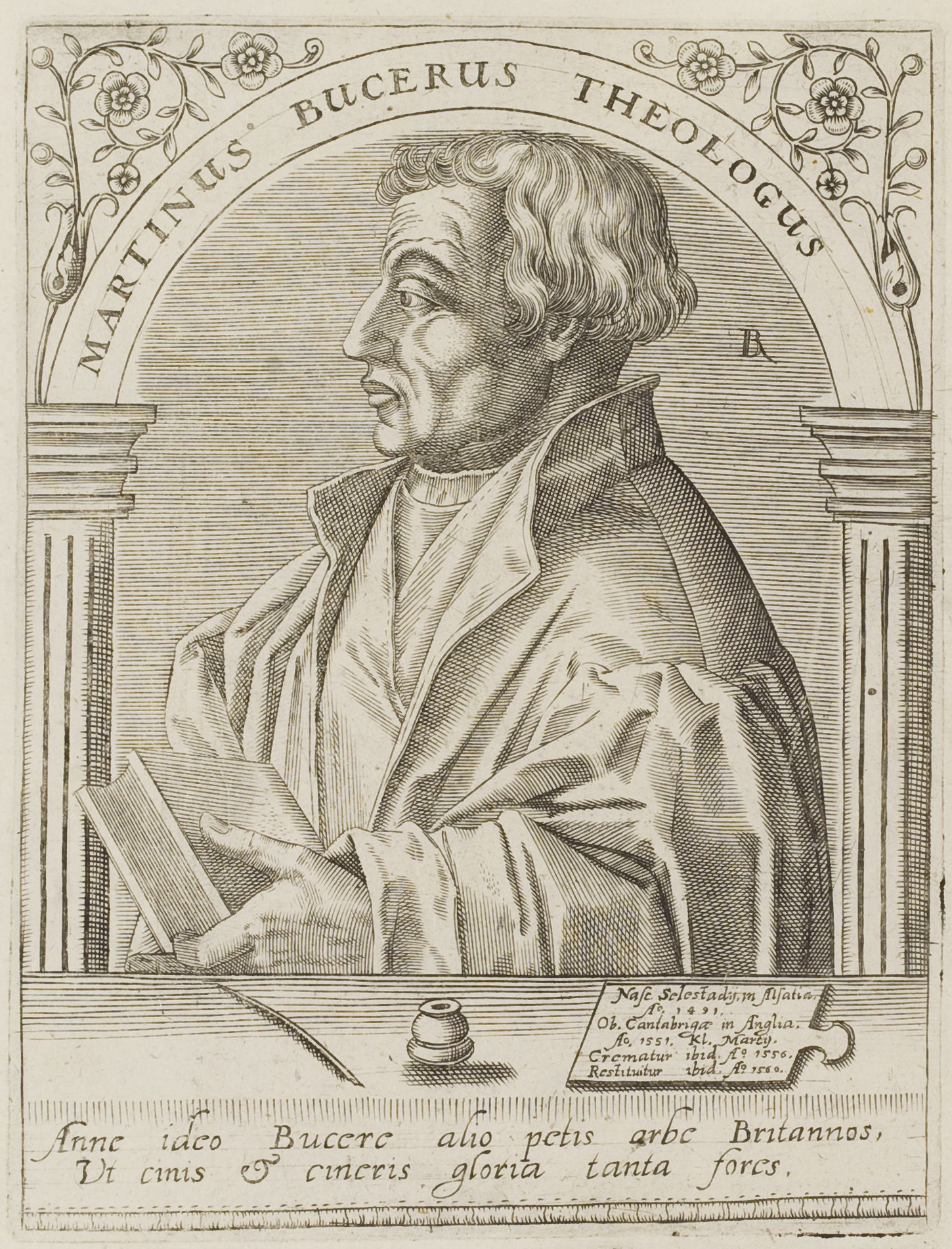
Martin Bucer (1491–1551) was a German reformer and theologian who was a Dominican friar and priest until his conversion to the Lutheranism in 1518. He is most famous for his focus on unity among all Christians, and therefore, he never settled his own sect but influenced many instead. Similar to other reformers, Bucer was attracted to the works of the humanist theologian and scholar Desiderius Erasmus (1466–1536) before discovering Martin Luther speak in 1518. Erasmus' humanism persuaded Bucer that Luther's beliefs were legitimate, even though Luther and Erasmus disagreed on many key issues. After departing from the Dominican order in 1521, Bucer preached the Lutheran faith and welcomed the new movement, marrying the former nun Elisabeth Silbereisen in 1522.

The Reformation was a triumph of literacy and the new printing press invented by Johannes Gutenberg. (Note: In the end, while the Reformation emphasis on Protestants reading the Scriptures was one factor in the development of literacy, the impact of printing itself, the wider availability of printed works at a cheaper price, and the increasing focus on education and learning as key factors in obtaining a lucrative post, were also significant contributory factors.) Luther's translation of the Bible into German was a decisive moment in the spread of literacy, and stimulated as well the printing and distribution of religious books and pamphlets. From 1517 onward, religious pamphlets flooded much of Europe. (Note: In the first decade of the Reformation, Luther's message became a movement, and the output of religious pamphlets in Germany was at its height.) During the Reformation, the Bible was translated into the native tongues of various European peoples, granting the common man access to sacred scripture, rather than relying solely on the Church's Latin version and interpretation. These translations, once forbidden, stirred a profound shift in religious thought, literacy, education, and the spread of Protestant ideas across parts of Holy Roman Empire and independent kingdoms. Reformers such as Martin Luther translated the Bible into German, making it accessible to ordinary German speakers. William Tyndale produced an English translation, although his efforts were met with resistance and he was captured in Antwerp before it was completed. Condemned for heresy, he was executed by strangulation and then burned at the stake at Vilvoorde in 1536. Similar translations into other native tongues took place across Europe.

Following the excommunication of Luther and condemnation of the Reformation by the Pope, the work and writings of John Calvin were influential in establishing a loose consensus among various groups in Switzerland, Scotland, Hungary, Germany and elsewhere. After the expulsion of its Bishop in 1526, and the unsuccessful attempts of the Bern reformer William Farel, Calvin was asked to discipline the city of Geneva. His Ordinances of 1541 involved a collaboration of Church affairs with the city council and consistory to bring morality to all areas of life. After the establishment of the Geneva academy in 1559, Geneva became the unofficial capital of the Protestant movement, providing refuge for Protestant exiles from all over Europe and educating them as Calvinist missionaries. The faith continued to spread after Calvin's death in 1564.

Protestantism also spread from the German lands into France, where the Protestants were nicknamed Huguenots. Despite heavy persecution, the Reformed tradition made steady progress across large sections of the nation, appealing to people alienated by the obduracy and the complacency of the Catholic establishment. French Protestantism came to acquire a distinctly political character, made all the more obvious by the conversions of nobles during the 1550s. This established the preconditions for a series of conflicts, known as the French Wars of Religion. The civil wars gained impetus with the sudden death of Henry II of France in 1559. Atrocity and outrage became the defining characteristics of the time, illustrated at their most intense in the St. Bartholomew's Day massacre of August 1572, when the Catholic party annihilated between 30,000 and 100,000 Huguenots across France. The wars only concluded when Henry IV of France issued the Edict of Nantes, promising official toleration of the Protestant minority, but under highly restricted conditions. Catholicism remained the official state religion, and the fortunes of French Protestants gradually declined over the next century, culminating in Louis XIV's Edict of Fontainebleau which revoked the Edict of Nantes and made Catholicism the sole legal religion. In response to the Edict of Fontainebleau, Frederick William I, Elector of Brandenburg declared the Edict of Potsdam, giving free passage to Huguenot refugees. In the late 17th century, many Huguenots fled. A significant community in France remained in the Cévennes region.

Parallel to events in Germany, a movement began in Switzerland under the leadership of Huldrych Zwingli. Although the two movements agreed on many issues of theology, some unresolved differences kept them separate. A long-standing resentment between the German states and the Swiss Confederation led to heated debate over how much Zwingli owed his ideas to Lutheranism. The German Prince Philip of Hesse saw potential in creating an alliance between Zwingli and Luther. A meeting was held in his castle in 1529, now known as the Colloquy of Marburg, which has become infamous for its failure. The two men could not come to any agreement due to their disputation over one key doctrine.

In 1534, King Henry VIII put an end to all papal jurisdiction in England, after the Pope failed to annul his marriage to Catherine of Aragon (due to political considerations involving the Holy Roman Emperor); this opened the door to reformational ideas. Later on, King Henry rejected the Pope's authority, instead of creating and accepting authority over the Church of England, a type of hybrid church that clashed together some Catholic doctrine and some Protestant ethics. Within the next 20 years, there was religious disturbance in England as Queen Mary I (1553–1558) restored Catholicism in England while persecuting and exiling Protestants, only to have Queen Elizabeth I and her Parliament try to lead the country back toward Protestantism during her reign (1558–1603). Reformers in the Church of England alternated between sympathies for ancient Catholic tradition and more Reformed principles, gradually developing into a tradition considered a middle way (via media) between the Catholic and Protestant traditions. The English Reformation followed a particular course. The different character of the English Reformation came primarily from the fact that it was driven initially by the political necessities of Henry VIII. King Henry decided to remove the Church of England from the authority of Rome. In 1534, the Act of Supremacy recognized Henry as "the only Supreme Head on earth of the Church of England". Between 1535 and 1540, under Thomas Cromwell, the policy known as the Dissolution of the Monasteries was put into effect. Following a brief Catholic restoration during the reign of Mary I, a loose consensus developed during the reign of Elizabeth I. The Elizabethan Religious Settlement largely formed Anglicanism into a distinctive church tradition. The compromise was uneasy and was capable of veering between extreme Calvinism on the one hand and Catholicism on the other. It was relatively successful until the Puritan Revolution or English Civil War in the 17th century.

The success of the Counterreformation ("Catholic Reformation") on the Continent and the growth of a Puritan party dedicated to further Protestant reform polarized the Elizabethan Age. The early Puritan movement was a movement for reform in the Church of England whose proponents desired for the Church of England to resemble more closely the Protestant churches of Europe, especially that of Geneva. The later Puritan movement, often referred to as dissenters and nonconformists, eventually led to the formation of various Reformed denominations.

The Scottish Reformation of 1560 decisively shaped the Church of Scotland. The Reformation in Scotland culminated ecclesiastically in the establishment of a church along Reformed lines, and politically in the triumph of English influence over that of France. John Knox is regarded as the leader of the Scottish Reformation. The Scottish Reformation Parliament of 1560 repudiated the pope's authority by the Papal Jurisdiction Act 1560, forbade the celebration of the Mass and approved a Protestant Confession of Faith. It was made possible by a revolution against French hegemony under the regime of the regent Mary of Guise, who had governed Scotland in the name of her absent daughter.

Some of the most important activists of the Protestant Reformation included Jacobus Arminius, Theodore Beza, Martin Bucer, Andreas von Carlstadt, Heinrich Bullinger, Balthasar Hubmaier, Thomas Cranmer, William Farel, Thomas Müntzer, Laurentius Petri, Olaus Petri, Philipp Melanchthon, Menno Simons, Louis de Berquin, Primož Trubar and John Smyth.

In the course of this religious upheaval, the German Peasants' War of 1524–25 swept through the Bavarian, Thuringian and Swabian principalities. After the Eighty Years' War in the Low Countries and the French Wars of Religion, the confessional division of the states of the Holy Roman Empire eventually erupted in the Thirty Years' War between 1618 and 1648. It devastated much of Germany, killing between 25% and 40% of its population. The main tenets of the Peace of Westphalia, which ended the Thirty Years' War, were:

- All parties would recognize the Peace of Augsburg of 1555, by which each prince would have the right to determine the religion of his own state, the options being Catholicism, Lutheranism, and now Calvinism. (the principle of cuius regio, eius religio)
- Christians living in principalities where their denomination was not the established church were guaranteed the right to practice their faith in public during allotted hours and in private at their will.
- The treaty also effectively ended the papacy's pan-European political power. Pope Innocent X declared the treaty "null, void, invalid, iniquitous, unjust, damnable, reprobate, inane, empty of meaning and effect for all times" in his bull Zelo Domus Dei. European sovereigns, Catholic and Protestant alike, ignored his verdict.

Peak of the Reformation and beginning of the Counterreformation ("Catholic Reformation") (1545–1620)

End of the Reformation and Counterreformation ("Catholic Reformation") (1648)

Religious situation in Europe, late 16th and early to mid-17th century

=== Post-Reformation ===
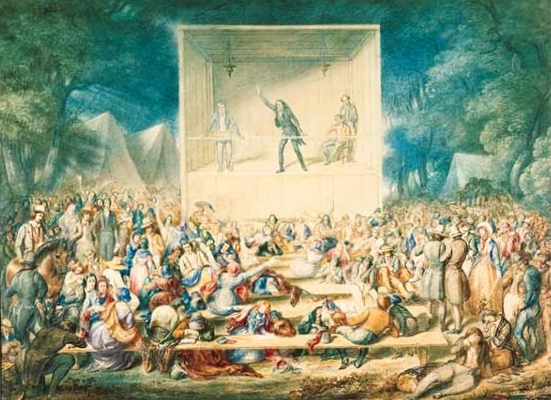
An 1839 Methodist camp meeting during the Second Great Awakening in the U.S.

The Great Awakenings were periods of rapid and dramatic religious revival in Anglo-American religious history.

The First Great Awakening was an evangelical and revitalization movement that swept through Protestant Europe and British America, especially the American colonies in the 1730s and 1740s, leaving a permanent impact on American Protestantism. It resulted from powerful preaching that gave listeners a sense of deep personal revelation of their need of salvation by Jesus Christ. Pulling away from ritual, ceremony, sacramentalism and hierarchy, it made Christianity intensely personal to the average person by fostering a deep sense of spiritual conviction and redemption, and by encouraging introspection and a commitment to a new standard of personal morality.

The Second Great Awakening began around 1790. It gained momentum by 1800. After 1820, membership rose rapidly among Baptist and Methodist congregations, whose preachers led the movement. It was past its peak by the late 1840s. It has been described as a reaction against skepticism, deism, and rationalism, although why those forces became pressing enough at the time to spark revivals is not fully understood. It enrolled millions of new members in existing evangelical denominations and led to the formation of new denominations.

The Third Great Awakening refers to a hypothetical historical period that was marked by religious activism in American history and spans the late 1850s to the early 20th century. It affected pietistic Protestant denominations and had a strong element of social activism. It gathered strength from the postmillennial belief that the Second Coming of Christ would occur after mankind had reformed the entire earth. It was affiliated with the Social Gospel Movement, which applied Christianity to social issues and gained its force from the Awakening, as did the worldwide missionary movement. New groupings emerged, such as the Holiness, Nazarene, and Christian Science movements.

The Fourth Great Awakening was a Christian religious awakening that some scholars—most notably, Robert Fogel—say took place in the United States in the late 1960s and early 1970s, while others look at the era following World War II. The terminology is controversial. Thus, the idea of a Fourth Great Awakening itself has not been generally accepted.

In 1814, Le Réveil swept through Calvinist regions in Switzerland and France.

In 1904, a Protestant revival in Wales had a tremendous impact on the local population. A part of British modernization, it drew many people to churches, especially Methodist and Baptist ones.

A noteworthy development in 20th-century Protestant Christianity was the rise of the modern Pentecostal movement. Sprung from Methodist and Wesleyan roots, it arose out of meetings at an urban mission on Azusa Street in Los Angeles. From there it spread around the world, carried by those who experienced what they believed to be miraculous moves of God there. These Pentecost-like manifestations have steadily been in evidence throughout history, such as seen in the two Great Awakenings. Pentecostalism, which in turn birthed the Charismatic movement within already established denominations, continues to be an important force in Western Christianity.

In the United States and elsewhere in the world, there has been a marked rise in the evangelical wing of Protestant denominations, especially those that are more exclusively evangelical, and a corresponding decline in the mainstream liberal churches. In the post–World War I era, Liberal Christianity was on the rise, and a considerable number of seminaries held and taught from a liberal perspective as well. In the post–World War II era, the trend began to swing back towards the conservative camp in America's seminaries and church structures.

In Europe, there has been a general move away from religious observance and belief in Christian teachings and a move towards secularism. The Enlightenment is largely responsible for the spread of secularism. Some scholars debate the link between Protestantism and the rise of secularism, and take as argument the wide-ranging freedom in Protestant-majority countries. However, the sole example of France demonstrates that even in Catholic-majority countries, the overwhelming impact of the Enlightenment has brought even stronger secularism and freedom of thought five centuries later. It is more reliable to consider that the Reformation influenced the critical thinkers of the subsequent centuries. Initial philosophers of the Enlightenment were defending a Christian conception of the world, but it was developed together with a fierce and decisive criticism of the Church, its politics, its ethics, its worldview, its scientific and cultural assumptions, leading to the devaluation of all forms of institutionalized Christianity, which extended over the centuries.

== Radical Reformation ==
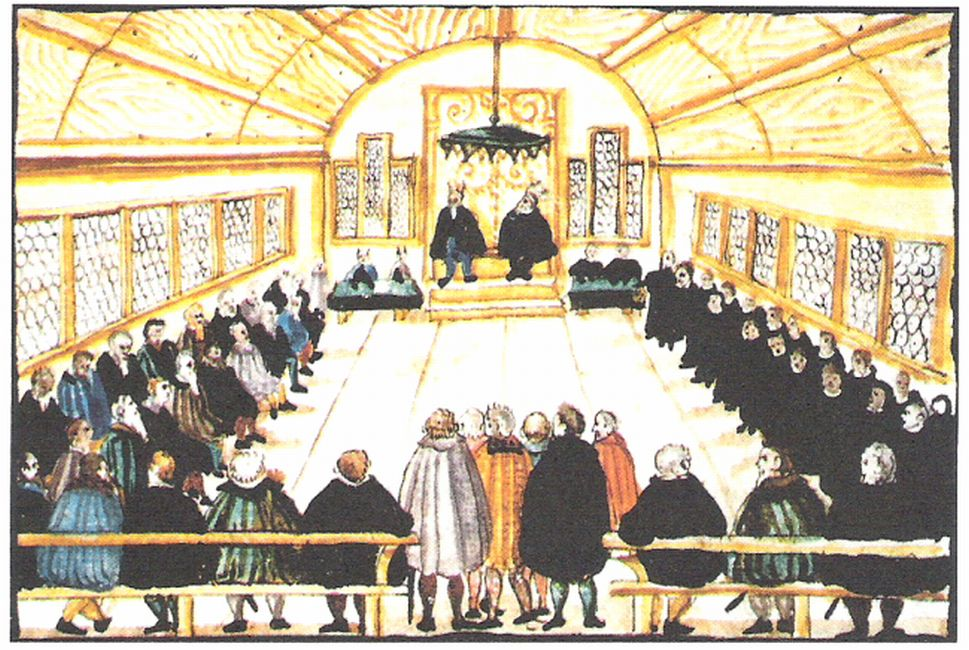
Dissatisfaction with the outcome of a disputation in 1525 prompted Swiss Brethren to part ways with Huldrych Zwingli.

Unlike mainstream Lutheran, Calvinist and Zwinglian movements, the Radical Reformation, which had no state sponsorship, generally abandoned the idea of the "Church visible" as distinct from the "Church invisible". It was a rational extension of the state-approved Protestant dissent, which took the value of independence from constituted authority a step further, arguing the same for the civic realm. The Radical Reformation was non-mainstream, though in parts of Germany, Switzerland and Austria, a majority would sympathize with the Radical Reformation despite the intense persecution it faced from both Catholics and Magisterial Protestants.

The early Anabaptists believed that their reformation must purify not only theology but also the actual lives of Christians, especially their political and social relationships. Therefore, the church should not be supported by the state, neither by tithes and taxes, nor by the use of the sword; Christianity was a matter of individual conviction, which could not be forced on anyone, but rather required a personal decision for it. Protestant ecclesial leaders such as Hubmaier and Hofmann preached the invalidity of infant baptism, advocating baptism as following conversion ("believer's baptism") instead. This was not a doctrine new to the reformers, but was taught by earlier groups, such as the Albigenses in 1147. Though most of the Radical Reformers were Anabaptist, some did not identify themselves with the mainstream Anabaptist tradition. Thomas Müntzer was involved in the German Peasants' War. Andreas Karlstadt disagreed theologically with Huldrych Zwingli and Martin Luther, teaching nonviolence and refusing to baptize infants while not rebaptizing adult believers. Kaspar Schwenkfeld and Sebastian Franck were influenced by German mysticism and spiritualism.

In the view of many associated with the Radical Reformation, the Magisterial Reformation had not gone far enough. Radical Reformer, Andreas von Bodenstein Karlstadt, for example, referred to the Lutheran theologians at Wittenberg as the "new papists". Since the term "magister" also means "teacher", the Magisterial Reformation is also characterized by an emphasis on the authority of a teacher. This is made evident in the prominence of Luther, Calvin, and Zwingli as leaders of the reform movements in their respective areas of ministry. Because of their authority, they were often criticized by Radical Reformers as being too much like the Roman Popes. A more political side of the Radical Reformation can be seen in the thought and practice of Hans Hut, although typically Anabaptism has been associated with pacifism.

Anabaptism in shape of its various diversification such as the Amish, Mennonites and Hutterites came out of the Radical Reformation. Later in history, Schwarzenau Brethren, and the Apostolic Christian Church would emerge in Anabaptist circles.

== Denominations ==
Map of Protestant Christianity in Europe by main denomination. Lutheranism Calvinism Anglicanism

Protestants refer to specific groupings of congregations or churches that share in common foundational doctrines and the name of their groups as denominations. The term denomination (national body) is to be distinguished from branch (denominational family; tradition), communion (international body) and congregation (church). An example (this is no universal way to classify Protestant churches, as these may sometimes vary broadly in their structures) to show the difference:

Branch/denominational family/tradition: Methodism

Communion/international body: World Methodist Council

Denomination/national body: United Methodist Church

Congregation/church: First United Methodist Church (Paintsville, Kentucky)

Historically speaking however, Protestantism does not include any branch/denomination of Christianity that did not emerge during the Protestant Reformation. This definition considers denominations, particularly Non-Denominationalism to be part of a "Post-Protestant/Post-Denominational" culture, or simply an unrelated offshoot of Protestantism. This is due to a multitude of reasons such as the Protestant Reformation ending centuries before many of the offshoot denominations or unaffiliated churches found today (including Pentecostalism, Seventh-day Adventism, non-denominational Christianity, and more). These branches of Christianity do not share historical heritage to the beginnings of Protestantism. Furthermore, they differ on multiple key points of theology of historical/confessional Protestant denominations (such as the importance and efficacy of the sacraments), and denominations which came after the Protestant Reformation (most of which are closer to Restorationism) lack the official creeds and confessions that defined the doctrines of the historic Protestant denominations. This stricter definition of Protestantism includes only branches such as Lutheranism, Anglicanism, and Calvinist/Reformed, the latter of which includes denominations such as Presbyterianism and Continental Reformed, Methodism, Congregationalism, and Baptist.

Protestants reject the Catholic Church's doctrine that it is the one true church, with some teaching belief in the invisible church, which consists of all who profess faith in Jesus Christ. The Lutheran Church traditionally sees itself as the "main trunk of the historical Christian Tree" founded by Christ and the Apostles, holding that during the Reformation, the Church of Rome fell away. Individual denominations also have formed over very subtle theological differences. Other denominations are simply regional or ethnic expressions of the same beliefs. Because the five solas are the main tenets of the Protestant faith, non-denominational groups and organizations are also considered Protestant.

Various ecumenical movements have attempted cooperation or reorganization of the various divided Protestant denominations, according to various models of union, but divisions continue to outpace unions, as there is no overarching authority to which any of the churches owe allegiance, which can authoritatively define the faith. Most denominations share common beliefs in the major aspects of the Christian faith while differing in many secondary doctrines, although what is major and what is secondary is a matter of idiosyncratic belief.

Several countries have established their national churches, linking the ecclesiastical structure with the state. Jurisdictions where a Protestant denomination has been established as a state religion include several Nordic countries; Denmark (including Greenland), the Faroe Islands (its church being independent since 2007), Iceland and Norway have established Evangelical Lutheran churches. Tuvalu has the only established church in Reformed tradition in the world, while Tonga—in the Methodist tradition.

The Church of England is the officially established religious institution in England, and also the Mother Church of the worldwide Anglican Communion.

In 1869, Finland was the first Nordic country to disestablish its Evangelical Lutheran church by introducing the Church Act. (Note: Finland's State Church was the Church of Sweden until 1809. As an autonomous Grand Duchy under Russia 1809–1917, Finland retained the Lutheran State Church system, and a state church separate from Sweden, later named the Evangelical Lutheran Church of Finland, was established. It was detached from the state as a separate judicial entity when the new church law came to force in 1869. After Finland had gained independence in 1917, religious freedom was declared in the constitution of 1919 and a separate law on religious freedom in 1922. Through this arrangement, the Evangelical Lutheran Church of Finland lost its position as a state church but gained a constitutional status as a national church alongside the Finnish Orthodox Church, whose position, however, is not codified in the constitution.) In 2000, Sweden was the second Nordic country to do so.

=== United and uniting churches ===
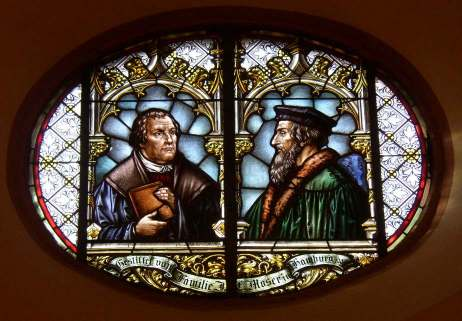
Glass window in the town church of Wiesloch featuring Martin Luther and John Calvin commemorating the 1821 union of Lutheran and Reformed churches in the Grand Duchy of Baden

United and uniting churches are churches formed from the merger or other form of union of two or more different Protestant denominations.

Historically, unions of Protestant churches were enforced by the state, usually in order to have a stricter control over the religious sphere of its people, but also for other organizational reasons. As modern Christian ecumenism progresses, unions between various Protestant traditions are becoming more and more common, resulting in a growing number of united and uniting churches. Some of the recent major examples are the Church of North India (1970), United Protestant Church of France (2013), and the Protestant Church in the Netherlands (2004). As mainline Protestantism shrinks in Europe and North America due to the rise of secularism or in areas where Christianity is a minority religion as with the Indian subcontinent, Reformed, Anglican, and Lutheran denominations merge, often creating large nationwide denominations.

What is perhaps the oldest official united church is found in Germany, where the Protestant Church in Germany is a federation of Lutheran, United (Prussian Union), and Reformed churches, dating back to 1817.

Around the world, each united or uniting church comprises a different mix of predecessor Protestant denominations. Trends are visible, however, as most united and uniting churches have one or more predecessors with heritage in the Reformed tradition and many are members of the World Alliance of Reformed Churches.

== Major branches ==
Protestants can be differentiated according to how they have been influenced by important movements since the Reformation, today regarded as branches. Some of these movements have a common lineage, sometimes directly spawning individual denominations. Due to the earlier stated multitude of denominations, this section discusses only the largest denominational families, or branches, widely considered to be a part of Protestantism. These are: Lutheranism, Anglicanism, Calvinism (Reformed Christianity), Methodism, Hussitism, Adventism, Pentecostalism, Quakerism, Plymouth Brethren and Baptists. The small but historically significant branch of Anabaptism is also discussed.

The chart below shows the mutual relations and historical origins of the main Protestant denominational families, or their parts. Due to factors such as Counterreformation ("Catholic Reformation") and the legal principle of Cuius regio, eius religio, many people lived as Nicodemites, where their professed religious affiliations were more or less at odds with the movement they sympathized with. As a result, the boundaries between the denominations do not separate as cleanly as this chart indicates. When a population was suppressed or persecuted into feigning an adherence to the dominant faith, over the generations they continued to influence the church they outwardly adhered to.

Because Calvinism was not specifically recognized in the Holy Roman Empire until the 1648 Peace of Westphalia, many Calvinists lived as Crypto-Calvinists. Due to Counterreformation ("Catholic Reformation") related suppressions in Catholic lands during the 16th through 19th centuries, many Protestants lived as Crypto-Protestants. Meanwhile, in Protestant areas, Catholics sometimes lived as crypto-papists, although in continental Europe emigration was more feasible so this was less common.

Historical chart of the main branches of Protestantism

=== Lutheranism ===
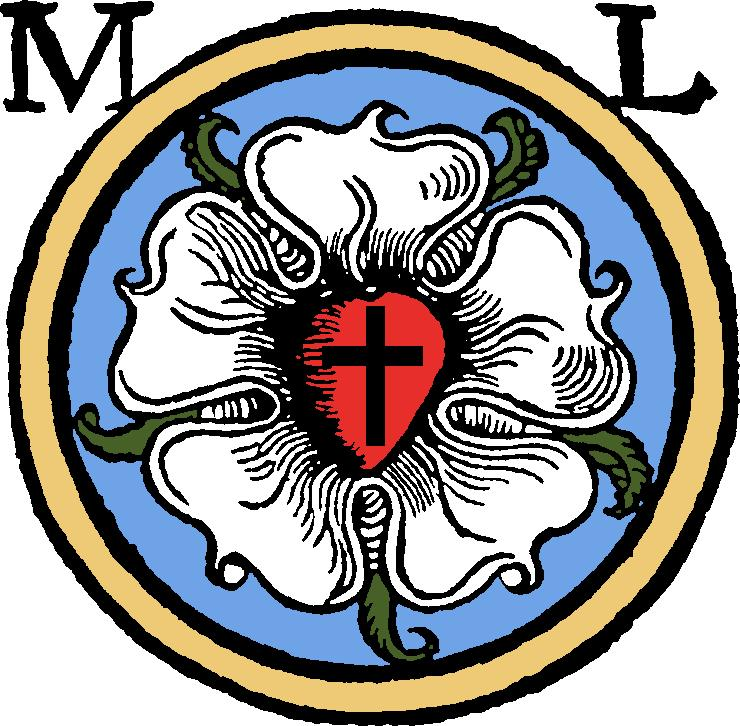
Luther's rose seal, a symbol of Lutheranism

Lutheranism identifies with the theology of Martin Luther. It advocates a doctrine of justification "by grace alone through faith alone on the basis of Scripture alone", the doctrine that scripture is the final authority on all matters of faith, rejecting the assertion made by Catholic leaders at the Council of Trent that authority comes from both Scriptures and Tradition. In addition, Lutherans accept the teachings of the first four ecumenical councils of the undivided Christian Church.

Unlike the Reformed tradition, Lutherans retain many of the liturgical practices and sacramental teachings of the pre-Reformation Church with an emphasis on the Eucharist, or Lord's Supper. Lutheran theology differs from Reformed theology in Christology, the purpose of God's Law, divine grace, the concept of perseverance of the saints, and predestination. Evangelical-Lutheranism has largely retained the liturgical calendar, as well as the structure of the pre-Reformation Church liturgy, which is often ornate and elaborate.

Today, Lutheranism is one of the largest branches of Protestantism. With approximately 80 million adherents, it constitutes the third most common Protestant confession after historically Pentecostal denominations and Anglicanism. The Lutheran World Federation, the largest global communion of Lutheran churches represents over 72 million people. Both of these figures miscount Lutherans worldwide as many members of more generically Protestant LWF member church bodies do not self-identify as Lutheran or attend congregations that self-identify as Lutheran. Additionally, there are other international organizations such as the Global Confessional and Missional Lutheran Forum, International Lutheran Council and the Confessional Evangelical Lutheran Conference, as well as Lutheran denominations that are not necessarily a member of an international organization.

=== Anglicanism ===
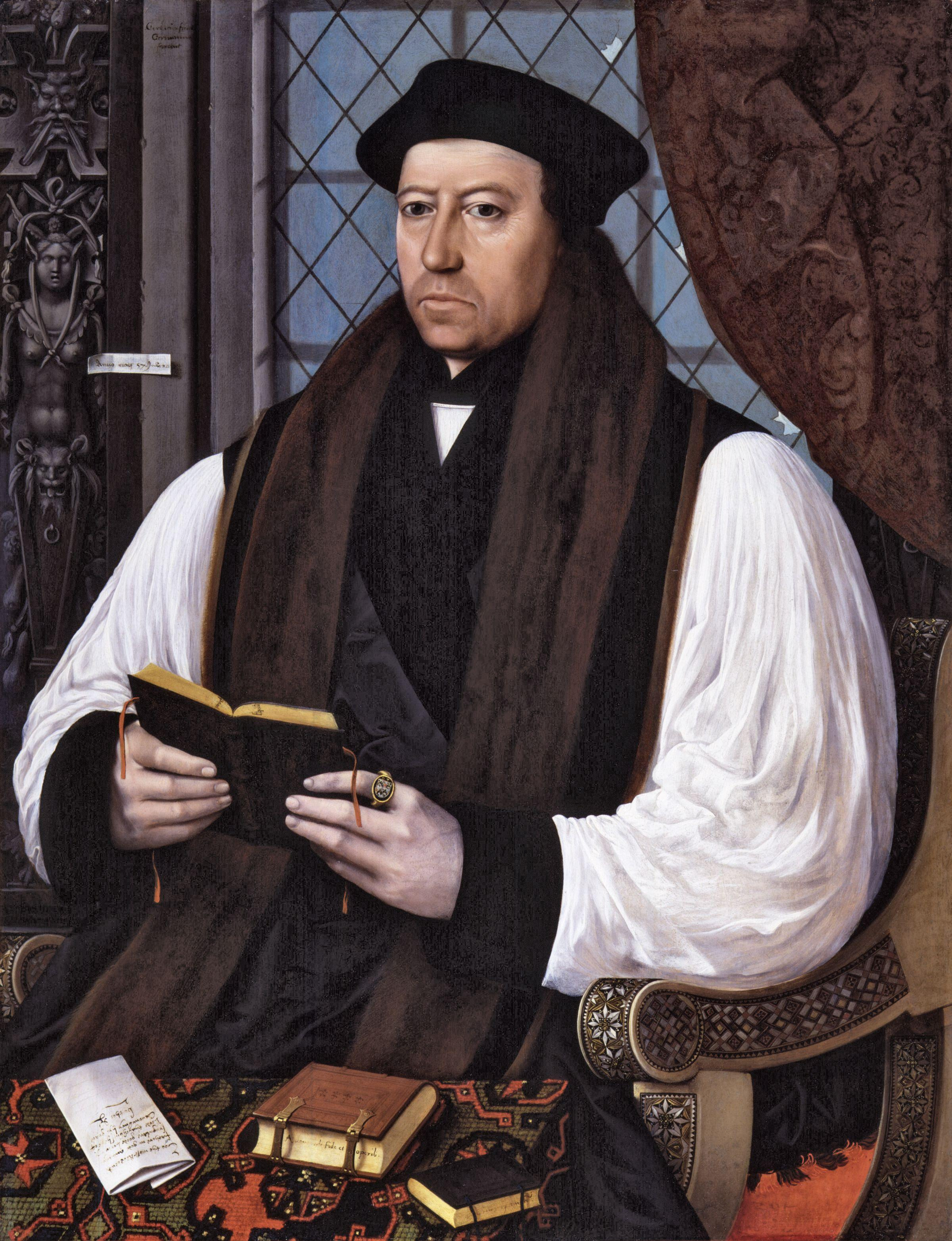
Thomas Cranmer, one of the most influential figures in shaping Anglican theology and self-identity

Anglicanism consists of the Church of England and churches which are historically tied to it or hold similar beliefs, worship practices and church structures. The word Anglican originates in ecclesia anglicana, a medieval Latin phrase dating to at least 1246 that means the English Church. There is no single "Anglican Church" with universal juridical authority, since each national or regional church has full autonomy. As the name suggests, the communion is an association of churches in full communion with the archbishop of Canterbury. The great majority of Anglicans are members of churches which are part of the international Anglican Communion, which has 85 million adherents.

The Church of England declared its independence from the Catholic Church at the time of the Elizabethan Religious Settlement. Many of the new Anglican formularies of the mid-16th century corresponded closely to those of contemporary Reformed tradition. These reforms were understood by one of those most responsible for them, the then archbishop of Canterbury, Thomas Cranmer, as navigating a middle way between two of the emerging Protestant traditions, namely Lutheranism and Calvinism.

Unique to Anglicanism is the Book of Common Prayer, the collection of services that worshippers in most Anglican churches used for centuries. While it has since undergone many revisions and Anglican churches in different countries have developed other service books, the Book of Common Prayer is still acknowledged as one of the ties that bind the Anglican Communion together. The Thirty-Nine Articles and the Books of Homilies explicate historic Anglican doctrine and along with the Book of Common Prayer, were developed under the reformer Thomas Cranmer.

=== Calvinism (Reformed Christianity) ===
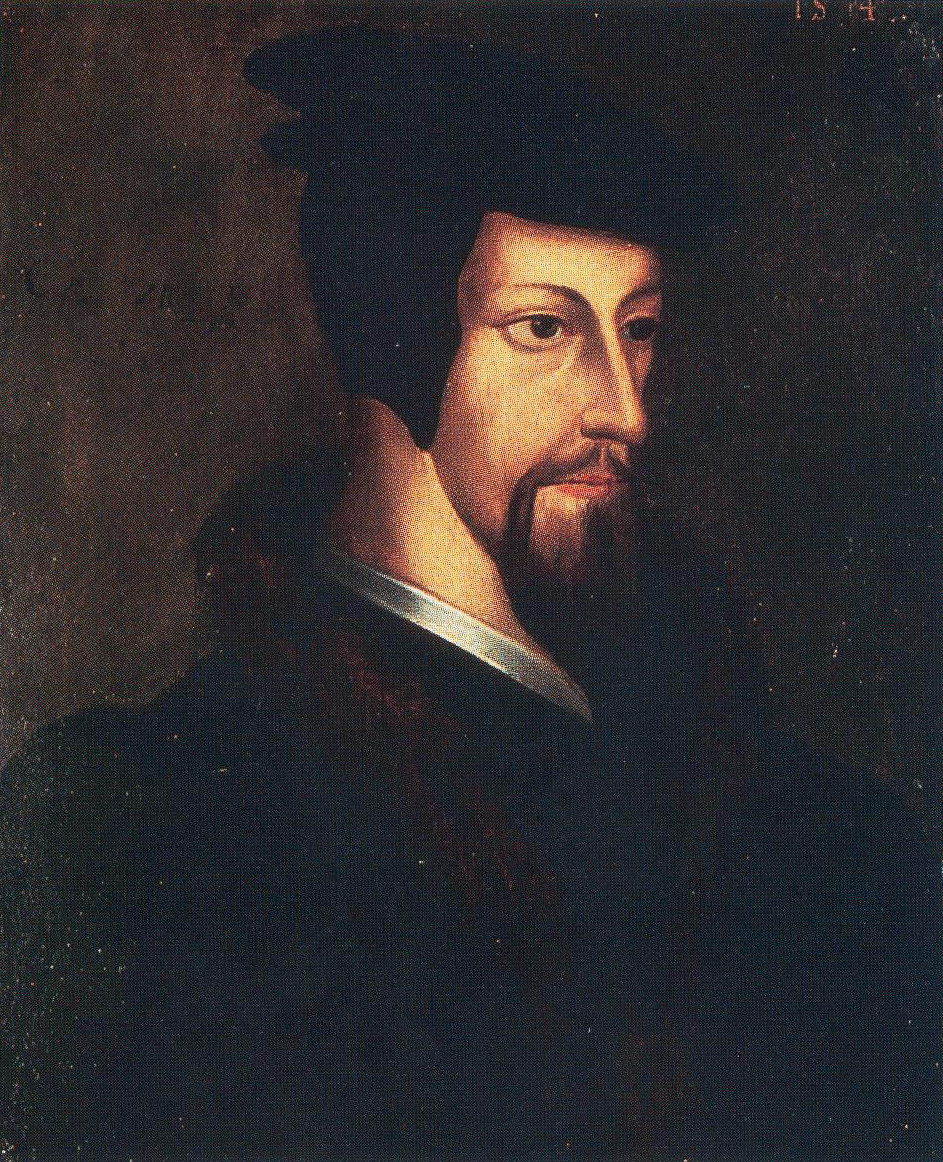
John Calvin's theological thought influenced a variety of Congregational, Continental Reformed, United, Presbyterian, and other Reformed churches.

Calvinism, also called the Reformed tradition, was advanced by several theologians such as Martin Bucer, Heinrich Bullinger, Peter Martyr Vermigli, and Huldrych Zwingli, but this branch of Christianity bears the name of the French reformer John Calvin because of his prominent influence on it and because of his role in the confessional and ecclesiastical debates throughout the 16th century.

This term also refers to the doctrines and practices of the Reformed churches of which Calvin was an early leader. Less commonly, it can refer to the individual teaching of Calvin himself. The particulars of Calvinist theology may be stated in a number of ways. Perhaps the best known summary is contained in the five points of Calvinism, though these points identify the Calvinist view on soteriology rather than summarizing the system as a whole. Broadly speaking, Calvinism stresses the sovereignty or rule of God in all things—in salvation but also in all of life. This concept is seen clearly in the doctrines of predestination and total depravity.

The biggest Reformed association is the World Communion of Reformed Churches with more than 80 million members in 211 member denominations around the world. There are more conservative Reformed federations like the World Reformed Fellowship and the International Conference of Reformed Churches, as well as independent churches.

=== Methodism ===
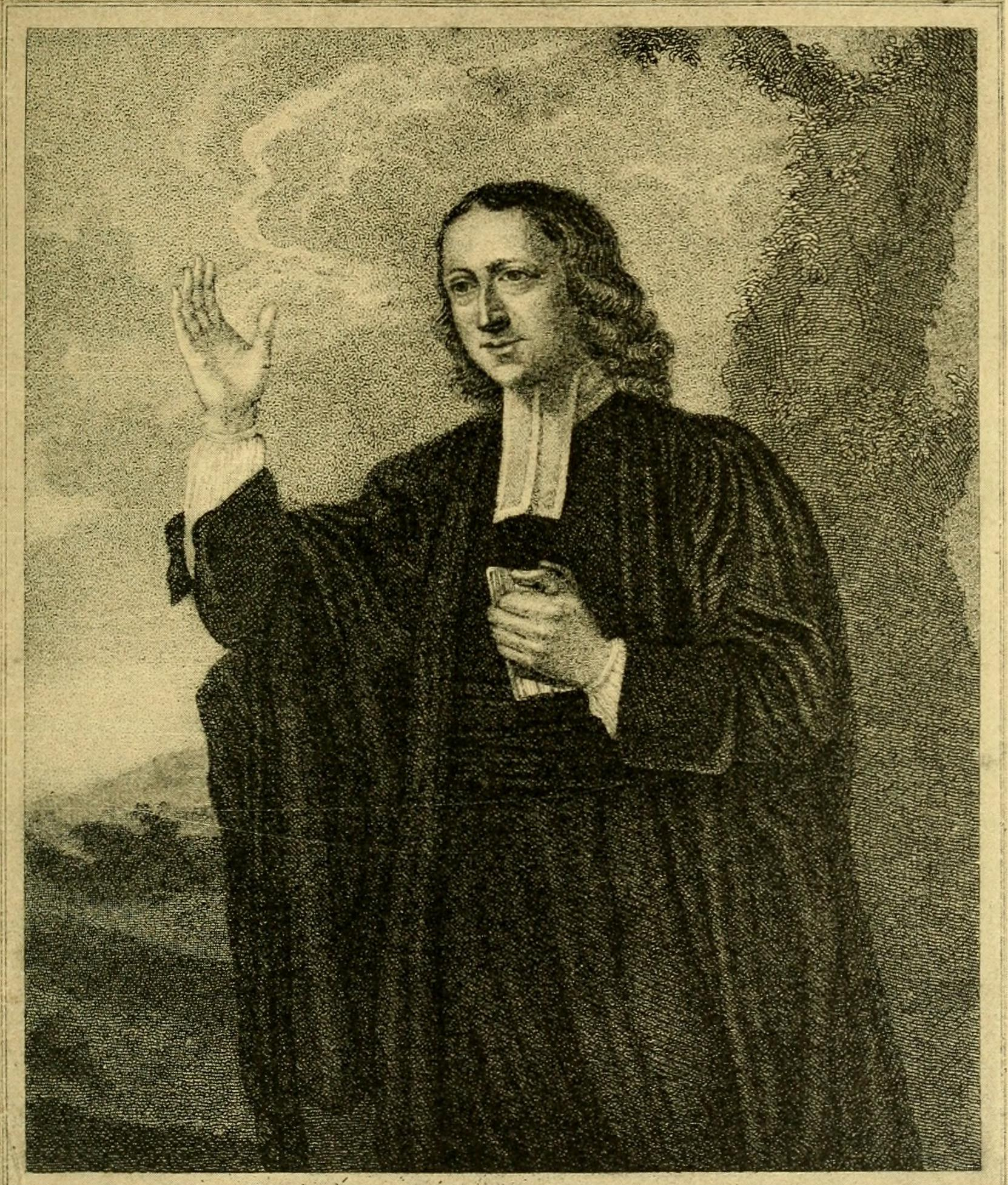
John Wesley, founder of Methodism, preaching in the open air

Methodism identifies principally with the theology of John Wesley. This evangelical movement originated as a revival within the 18th-century Church of England and became a separate Church following Wesley's death. Because of vigorous missionary activity, the movement spread throughout the British Empire, the United States, and beyond, today claiming approximately 80 million adherents worldwide. Originally it appealed especially to laborers and slaves.

Soteriologically, most Methodists are Arminian, emphasizing that Christ accomplished salvation for every human being, and that humans must exercise an act of the will to receive it (as opposed to the traditional Calvinist doctrine of monergism). Methodism is traditionally low church in liturgy, although this varies greatly between individual congregations; the Wesleys themselves greatly valued the Anglican liturgy and tradition. Methodism is known for its rich musical tradition; John Wesley's brother, Charles, was instrumental in writing much of the hymnody of the Methodist Church, and many other eminent hymn writers come from the Methodist tradition. The Holiness movement refers to a set of practices surrounding the doctrine of Christian perfection that emerged within 19th-century Methodism, along with a number of evangelical denominations and parachurch organizations (such as camp meetings). There are an estimated 12 million adherents in denominations aligned with the Wesleyan-holiness movement. The Free Methodist Church, the Salvation Army and the Wesleyan Methodist Church are notable examples, while other adherents of the Holiness Movement remained within mainline Methodism, e.g. the United Methodist Church.

=== Hussitism ===
Hussitism follows the teachings of Czech reformer Jan Hus, who became the best-known representative of the Bohemian Reformation and one of the forerunners of the Protestant Reformation. An early hymnal was the hand-written Jistebnice hymn book. This predominantly religious movement was propelled by social issues and strengthened Czech national awareness. Among present-day Christians, Hussite traditions are represented in the Moravian Church, Unity of the Brethren and the Czechoslovak Hussite Church.

=== Adventism ===
Adventism began in the 19th century in the context of the Second Great Awakening revival in the United States. The name refers to belief in the imminent Second Coming of Christ. William Miller started the Adventist movement in the 1830s. His followers became known as Millerites.

Although the Adventist churches hold much in common, their theologies differ on whether the intermediate state is unconscious sleep or consciousness, whether the ultimate punishment of the wicked is annihilation or eternal torment, the nature of immortality, whether or not the wicked are resurrected after the millennium, and whether the sanctuary of Daniel 8 refers to the one in heaven or one on earth. The movement has encouraged the examination of the whole Bible, leading Seventh-day Adventists and some smaller Adventist groups to observe the Sabbath. The General Conference of Seventh-day Adventists has compiled that church's core beliefs in the 28 Fundamental Beliefs (1980 and 2005), which use Biblical references as justification.

In 2010, Adventism claimed some 22 million believers scattered in various independent churches. The largest church within the movement—the Seventh-day Adventist Church—has more than 18 million members.

=== Pentecostalism ===
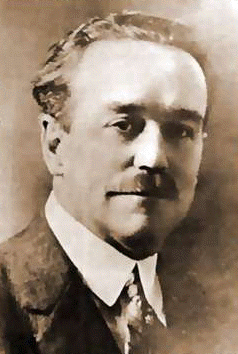
Charles Fox Parham, who associated glossolalia with the baptism in the Holy Spirit

Pentecostalism is a movement that places special emphasis on a direct personal experience of God through the baptism with the Holy Spirit. The term Pentecostal is derived from Pentecost, the Greek name for the Jewish Feast of Weeks. For Christians, this event commemorates the descent of the Holy Spirit upon the followers of Jesus Christ, as described in the second chapter of the Book of Acts.

This branch of Protestantism is distinguished by belief in the baptism with the Holy Spirit as an experience separate from conversion that enables a Christian to live a life empowered by and filled with the Holy Spirit. This empowerment includes the use of spiritual gifts such as speaking in tongues and divine healing—two other defining characteristics of Pentecostalism. Because of their commitment to biblical authority, spiritual gifts, and the miraculous, Pentecostals tend to see their movement as reflecting the same kind of spiritual power and teachings that were found in the Apostolic Age of the early church. For this reason, some Pentecostals also use the term Apostolic or Full Gospel to describe their movement.

Pentecostalism eventually spawned hundreds of new denominations, including large groups such as the Assemblies of God and the Church of God in Christ, both in the United States and elsewhere. There are over 279 million Pentecostals worldwide, and the movement is growing in many parts of the world, especially the global South. Since the 1960s, Pentecostalism has increasingly gained acceptance from other Christian traditions, and Pentecostal beliefs concerning Spirit baptism and spiritual gifts have been embraced by non-Pentecostal Christians in Protestant and Catholic churches through the Charismatic Movement. Together, Pentecostal and Charismatic Christianity numbers over 500 million adherents.

=== Quakerism ===
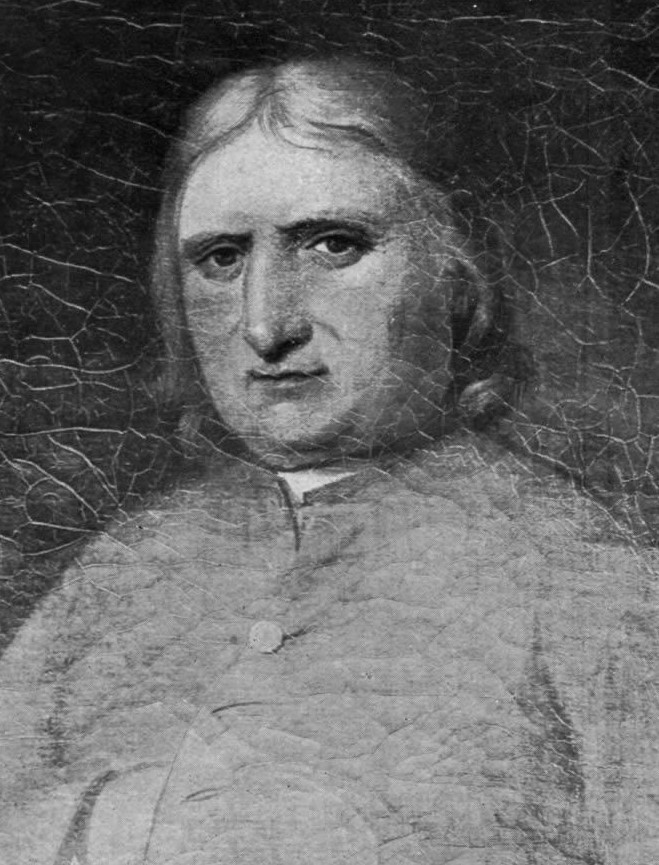
George Fox was an English dissenter and a founder of the Religious Society of Friends, commonly known as the Quakers or Friends.

Quakers, or Friends, are members of a family of religious movements collectively known as the Religious Society of Friends. The central unifying doctrine of these movements is the priesthood of all believers. Many Friends view themselves as members of a Christian denomination. They include those with evangelical, holiness, liberal, and traditional conservative Quaker understandings of Christianity. Unlike many other groups that emerged within Christianity, the Religious Society of Friends has actively tried to avoid creeds and hierarchical structures.

=== Plymouth Brethren ===
The Plymouth Brethren are a conservative, low church, evangelical denomination, whose history can be traced to Dublin, Ireland, in the late 1820s, originating from Anglicanism. Among other beliefs, the group emphasizes sola scriptura. Brethren generally see themselves not as a denomination, but as a network, or even as a collection of overlapping networks, of like-minded independent churches. Although the group refused for many years to take any denominational name to itself—a stance that some of them still maintain—the title The Brethren, is one that many of their number are comfortable with in that the Bible designates all believers as brethren.

=== Baptists ===
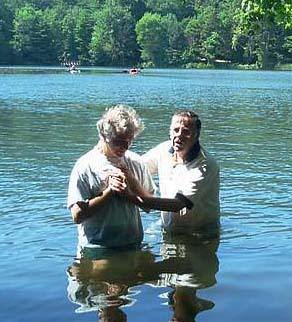
Baptists subscribe to a doctrine that baptism should be performed only for professing believers.

Baptists subscribe to a doctrine that baptism should be performed only for professing believers (believer's baptism, as opposed to infant baptism), and that it must be done by complete immersion (as opposed to affusion or sprinkling). Baptists also claim that infant baptisms are false due to the infant's lack of understanding of virtues and sins, making them not able (according to Baptists) to confess their faith, which also regarded their lack of being able to speak at such a young age, compared to adults. Other tenets of Baptist churches include soul competency (liberty), salvation through faith alone, Scripture alone as the rule of faith and practice, and the autonomy of the local congregation. Baptists recognize two ministerial offices, pastors and deacons. Baptist churches are widely considered to be Protestant churches, though some Baptists disavow this identity.

Diverse from their beginning, those identifying as Baptists today differ widely from one another in what they believe, how they worship, their attitudes toward other Christians, and their understanding of what is important in Christian discipleship. The separation of Church and state is also a huge belief of Anabaptists. They have strongly supported this because they believe its a Biblical concept to follow, and they were persecuted by Protestant and Catholic authorities. Arguing that Christ did not give magistrates the power to form churches or constrain citizens in matters of religion. There is some disagreement regarding the precise origins of the Anabaptists, but majority of scholars claim that the Anabaptist religion began around 1525 in Zurich, Switzerland.

Historians trace the earliest church labeled Baptist back to 1609 in Amsterdam, with English Separatist John Smyth as its pastor. Baptist practice spread to England, where the General Baptists considered Christ's atonement to extend to all people, while the Particular Baptists believed that it extended only to the elect. In 1638, Roger Williams established the first Baptist congregation in the North American colonies. In the mid-18th century, the First Great Awakening increased Baptist growth in both New England and the South. The Second Great Awakening in the South in the early 19th century increased church membership, as did the preachers' lessening of support for abolition and manumission of slavery, which had been part of the 18th-century teachings. Baptist missionaries have spread their church to every continent.

The Baptist World Alliance reports more than 41 million members in more than 150,000 congregations. In 2002, there were over 100 million Baptists and Baptistic group members worldwide and over 33 million in North America. The largest Baptist association is the Southern Baptist Convention, with the membership of associated churches totaling more than 14 million.

=== Anabaptism ===
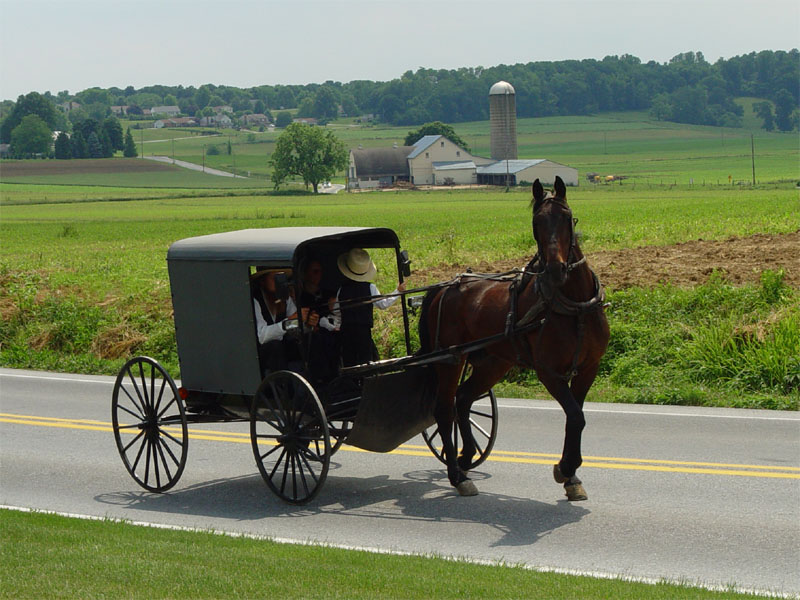
An Amish family in a horse-drawn square buggy in Lancaster County, Pennsylvania, United States

Anabaptism traces its origins to the Radical Reformation. Anabaptists believe in delaying baptism until the candidate confesses his or her faith. Although some consider this movement to be an offshoot of Protestantism, others see it as a distinct one. The Amish, Hutterites, and Mennonites are direct descendants of the movement. Schwarzenau Brethren, Bruderhof, and the Apostolic Christian Church are considered later developments among the Anabaptists.

The name Anabaptist, meaning "one who baptizes again", was given to them by their persecutors in reference to the practice of re-baptizing converts who already had been baptized as infants. Anabaptists required that baptismal candidates be able to make their own confessions of faith and so rejected baptism of infants. The early members of this movement did not accept the name Anabaptist, claiming that since infant baptism was unscriptural and null and void, the baptizing of believers was not a re-baptism but in fact their first real baptism. As a result of their views on the nature of baptism and other issues, Anabaptists were heavily persecuted during the 16th century and into the 17th by both Magisterial Protestants and Catholics. While most Anabaptists adhered to a literal interpretation of the Sermon on the Mount, which precluded taking oaths, participating in military actions, and participating in civil government, some who practiced re-baptism felt otherwise. (Note: For example, the followers of Thomas Müntzer and Balthasar Hubmaier.) They were thus technically Anabaptists, even though conservative Amish, Mennonites, and Hutterites and some historians tend to consider them as outside of true Anabaptism. Anabaptist reformers of the Radical Reformation are divided into Radical and the so-called Second Front. Some important Radical Reformation theologians were John of Leiden, Thomas Müntzer, Kaspar Schwenkfeld, Sebastian Franck, and Menno Simons. Second Front Reformers included Hans Denck, Conrad Grebel, Balthasar Hubmaier and Felix Manz. Many Anabaptists today still use the Ausbund, which is the oldest hymnal still in continuous use.

== Other Protestants and similar movements ==
There are many other Protestant denominations that do not fit neatly into the mentioned branches, and are far smaller in membership. Some groups of individuals who hold basic Protestant tenets identify themselves simply as "Christians" or "born-again Christians". They typically distance themselves from the confessionalism or creedalism of other Christian communities by calling themselves "non-denominational" or "evangelical". Often founded by individual pastors, they have little affiliation with historic denominations.

Although Unitarianism developed from the Protestant Reformation, it is excluded from Protestantism due to its Nontrinitarian theological nature. Unitarianism has been popular in the region of Transylvania within today's Romania, England, and the United States. It originated almost simultaneously in Transylvania and the Polish–Lithuanian Commonwealth.

Restorationist movements, such as the Stone–Campbell Movement, Swedenborgians, Irvingians, Christadelphians, Mormons, and the Bible Student movement, including Jehovah's Witnesses, have roots in Protestantism; however, in their quest to fully restore the early church, they reject historical creeds and the significance of the Reformation, and many hold to non-Trinitarian theology—which is why many scholars question their classification as Protestant.

Spiritual Christianity is the group of Russian movements (Doukhobors, Molokans and others), so-called folk Protestants or Protestant-like movements. Their origins are varied: some were influenced by western Protestants, others from disgust of the behavior of official Orthodox priests.

Messianic Judaism is a movement of the Jews and non-Jews, which arose in the 1960s within Evangelical Protestantism and absorbed elements of the messianic traditions in Judaism. The similar movement within Bangladeshi Protestants is the Messianic Mosques, which combines Christian faith with Islamic culture.

== Interdenominational movements ==
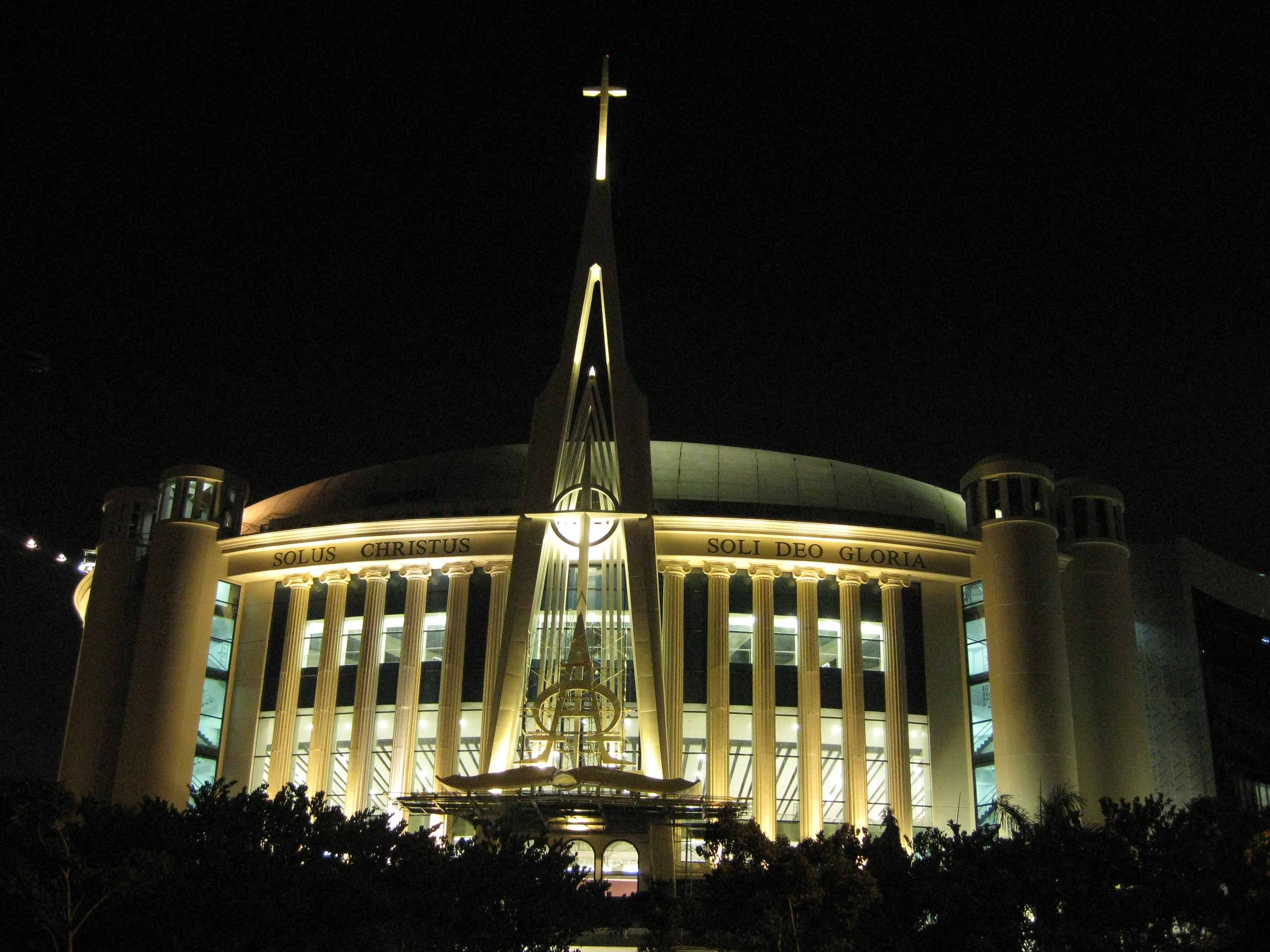
An Indonesian Reformed Evangelical Church megachurch

There are also Christian movements which cross denominational lines and even branches, and cannot be classified on the same level previously mentioned forms. Evangelicalism is a prominent example. Some of those movements are active exclusively within Protestantism, some are Christian-wide. Transdenominational movements are sometimes capable of affecting parts of the Catholic Church, such as does it the Charismatic Movement, which aims to incorporate beliefs and practices similar to Pentecostals into the various branches of Christianity. Neo-charismatic churches are sometimes regarded as a subgroup of the Charismatic Movement. Both are put under a common label of Charismatic Christianity (so-called Renewalists), along with Pentecostals. Nondenominational churches and various house churches often adopt, or are akin to one of these movements.

Megachurches are usually influenced by interdenominational movements. Globally, these large congregations are a significant development in Protestant Christianity. In the United States, the phenomenon has more than quadrupled in the past two decades. It has since spread worldwide.

The chart below shows the mutual relations and historical origins of the main interdenominational movements and other developments within Protestantism.

Links between interdenominational movements and other developments within Protestantism

=== Evangelicalism ===
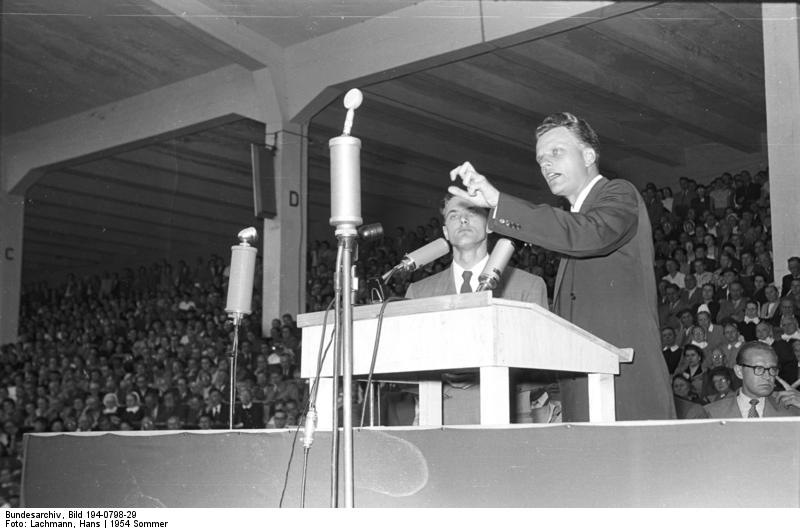
Billy Graham, a prominent evangelical revivalist, preaching in Duisburg, Germany, in 1954

Evangelicalism, or evangelical Protestantism, (Note: Primarily in the United States, where Protestants are usually placed in one of two categories—Mainline or Evangelical.) is a worldwide, transdenominational movement which maintains that the essence of the gospel consists in the doctrine of salvation by grace through faith in Jesus Christ's atonement.

Evangelicals are Christians who believe in the centrality of the conversion or "born again" experience in receiving salvation, believe in the authority of the Bible as God's revelation to humanity and have a strong commitment to evangelism or sharing the Christian message.

It gained great momentum in the 18th and 19th centuries with the emergence of Methodism and the Great Awakenings in Britain and North America. The origins of Evangelicalism are usually traced back to the English Methodist movement, Nicolaus Zinzendorf, the Moravian Church, Lutheran Pietism, Presbyterianism and Puritanism. Among leaders and major figures of the Evangelical Protestant movement were John Wesley, George Whitefield, Jonathan Edwards, Billy Graham, Harold John Ockenga, John Stott and Martyn Lloyd-Jones.

There are an estimated 285,480,000 Evangelicals, corresponding to 13% of the Christian population and 4% of the total world population. The Americas, Africa and Asia are home to the majority of Evangelicals. The United States has the largest concentration of Evangelicals. Evangelicalism is gaining popularity, especially in Latin America and the developing world.

=== Charismatic movement ===
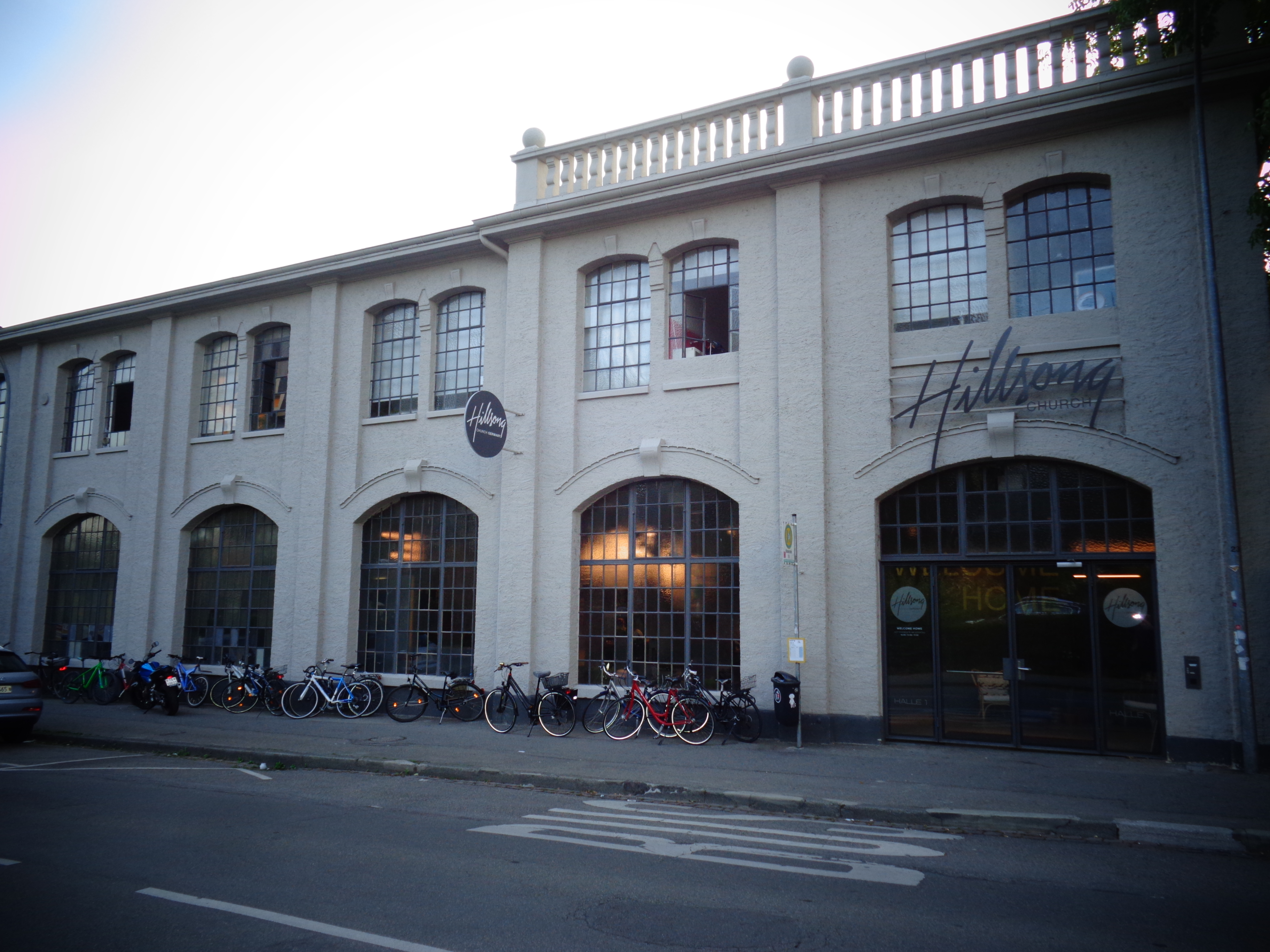
Hillsong Church, an evangelical charismatic church, in Konstanz, Germany

The Charismatic movement is the international trend of historically mainstream congregations adopting beliefs and practices similar to Pentecostals. Fundamental to the movement is the use of spiritual gifts. Among Protestants, the movement began around 1960.

In the United States, Episcopalian Dennis Bennett is sometimes cited as one of the charismatic movement's seminal influence. In the United Kingdom, Colin Urquhart, Michael Harper, David Watson and others were in the vanguard of similar developments. The Massey conference in New Zealand, 1964 was attended by several Anglicans, including the Rev. Ray Muller, who went on to invite Bennett to New Zealand in 1966, and played a leading role in developing and promoting the Life in the Spirit seminars. Other Charismatic movement leaders in New Zealand include Bill Subritzky.

Larry Christenson, a Lutheran theologian based in San Pedro, California, did much in the 1960s and 1970s to interpret the charismatic movement for Lutherans. A very large annual conference regarding that matter was held in Minneapolis. Charismatic Lutheran congregations in Minnesota became especially large and influential; especially "Hosanna!" in Lakeville, and North Heights in St. Paul. The next generation of Lutheran charismatics cluster around the Alliance of Renewal Churches. There is considerable charismatic activity among young Lutheran leaders in California centered around an annual gathering at Robinwood Church in Huntington Beach. Richard A. Jensen's Touched by the Spirit published in 1974, played a major role of the Lutheran understanding to the charismatic movement.

In Congregational and Presbyterian churches which profess a traditionally Calvinist or Reformed theology there are differing views regarding present-day continuation or cessation of the gifts (charismata) of the Spirit. Generally, however, Reformed charismatics distance themselves from renewal movements with tendencies which could be perceived as overemotional, such as Word of Faith, Toronto Blessing, Brownsville Revival and Lakeland Revival. Prominent Reformed charismatic denominations are the Sovereign Grace Churches and the Every Nation churches in the US, in Great Britain there is the Newfrontiers churches and movement, which leading figure is Terry Virgo.

A minority of Seventh-day Adventists today are charismatic. They are strongly associated with those holding more "progressive" Adventist beliefs. In the early decades of the church charismatic or ecstatic phenomena were commonplace.

=== Neo-charismatic churches ===
Neo-charismatic or neo-Pentecostal churches are a category of churches in the Christian Renewal movement. Neo-charismatics include the Third Wave, but are broader. Now more numerous than Pentecostals (first wave) and charismatics (second wave) combined, owing to the remarkable growth of postdenominational and independent charismatic groups.

Neo-charismatics believe in and stress the post-Biblical availability of gifts of the Holy Spirit, including glossolalia, healing, and prophecy. They practice laying on of hands and seek the "infilling" of the Holy Spirit. However, a specific experience of baptism with the Holy Spirit may not be requisite for experiencing such gifts. No single form, governmental structure, or style of church service characterizes all neo-charismatic services and churches.

Some nineteen thousand denominations, with approximately 295 million individual adherents, are identified as neo-charismatic.

== Protestant offshoots ==
=== Arminianism ===
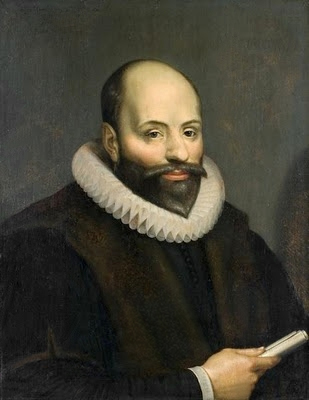
Jacobus Arminius, a Dutch Reformed Church theologian, whose views influenced parts of Protestantism. A small Remonstrants community remains in the Netherlands.

Arminianism is based on theological ideas of the Dutch Reformed theologian Jacobus Arminius (1560–1609) and his historic supporters known as Remonstrants. His teachings held to the five solae of the Reformation, but they were distinct from particular teachings of Martin Luther, Huldrych Zwingli, John Calvin, and other Protestant Reformers. Jacobus Arminius was a student of Theodore Beza at the Theological University of Geneva. Arminianism is known to some as a soteriological diversification of Calvinism. However, to others, Arminianism is a reclamation of early Church theological consensus. Dutch Arminianism was originally articulated in the Remonstrance (1610), a theological statement signed by 45 ministers and submitted to the States General of the Netherlands. Many Christian denominations have been influenced by Arminian views on the will of man being freed by grace before regeneration, notably the Baptists in the 16th century, the Methodists in the 18th century and the Seventh-day Adventist Church in the 19th century.

The original beliefs of Jacobus Arminius himself are commonly defined as Arminianism, but more broadly, the term may embrace the teachings of Hugo Grotius, John Wesley, and others as well. Classical Arminianism and Wesleyan Arminianism are the two main schools of thought. Wesleyan Arminianism is often identical with Methodism. The two systems of Calvinism and Arminianism share both history and many doctrines, and the history of Christian theology. However, because of their differences over the doctrines of divine predestination and election, many people view these schools of thought as opposed to each other. In short, the difference can be seen ultimately by whether God allows His desire to save all to be resisted by an individual's will (in the Arminian doctrine) or if God's grace is irresistible and limited to only some (in Calvinism). Some Calvinists assert that the Arminian perspective presents a synergistic system of Salvation and therefore is not only by grace, while Arminians firmly reject this conclusion. Many consider the theological differences to be crucial differences in doctrine, while others find them to be relatively minor.

=== Pietism ===
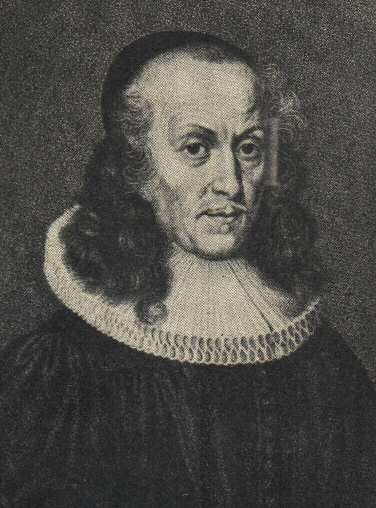
Philipp Jakob Spener, a German pioneer and founder of Pietism

Pietism was an influential movement within Lutheranism that combined the 17th-century Lutheran principles with the Reformed emphasis on individual piety and living a vigorous Christian life. (Note: In places, such as parts of England and America, where Pietism was frequently juxtaposed with Catholicism, Catholics also became naturally influenced by Pietism, helping to foster a stronger tradition of congregational hymn-singing, including among Pietists who converted to Catholicism and brought their pietistic inclination with them, such as Frederick William Faber.)

It began in the late 17th century, reached its zenith in the mid-18th century, and declined through the 19th century, and had almost vanished in America by the end of the 20th century. Pietistic Lutheranism influenced Lutheranism as a whole and resulted in the formation of certain Pietistic Lutheran denominations (such as the Church of the Lutheran Brethren and Laestadian Lutheran Church); additionally some of its theological tenets influenced Protestantism generally, inspiring the Anglican priest John Wesley to begin the Methodist movement and Alexander Mack to begin the Schwarzenau Brethren denomination in the Anabaptist tradition.

Though Pietism shares an emphasis on personal behavior with the Puritan movement, and the two are often confused, there are important differences, particularly in the concept of the role of religion in government.

=== Puritanism, English dissenters and nonconformists ===
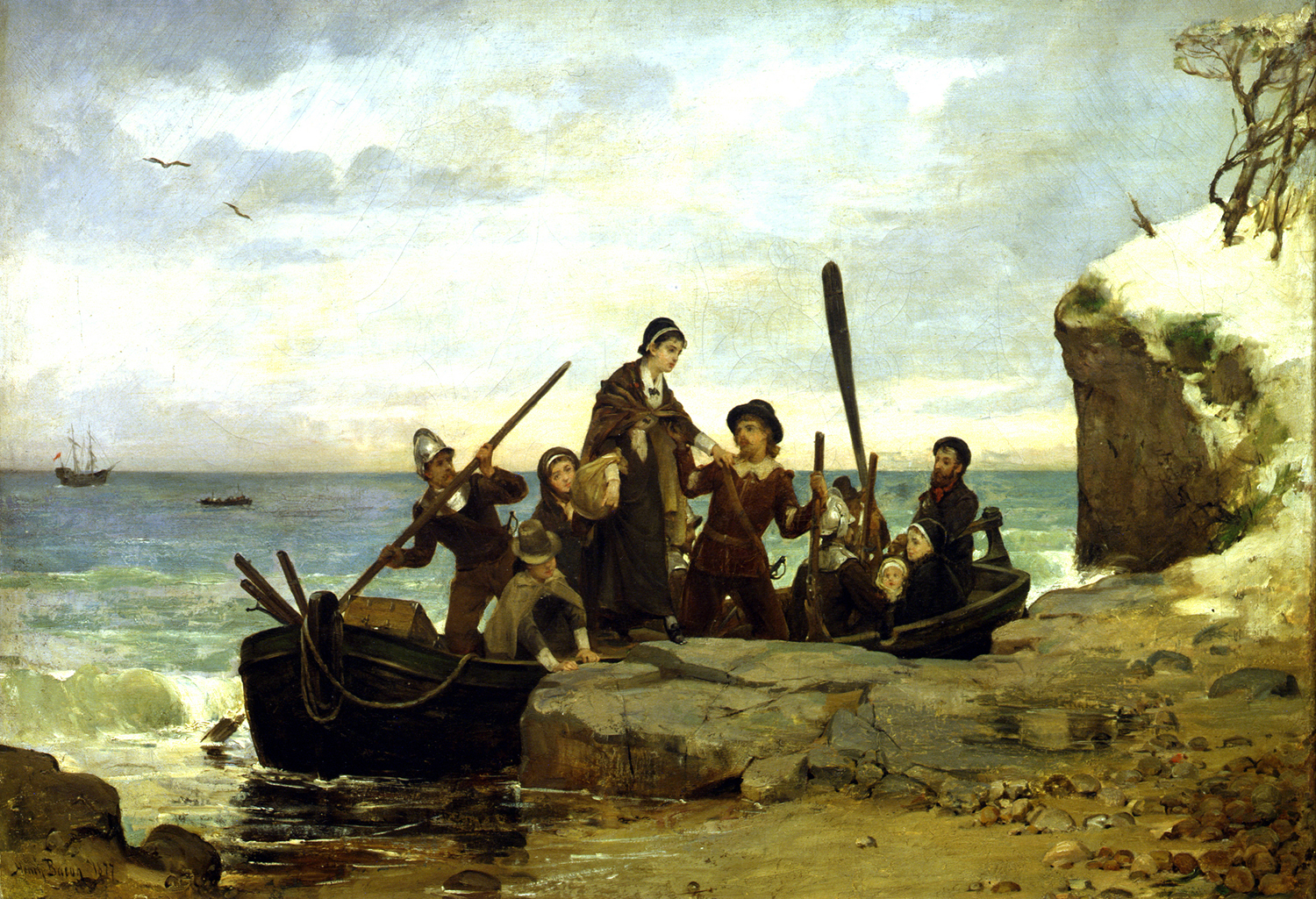
Pilgrims landing at Plymouth Rock in Plymouth, Massachusetts, in 1620

The Puritans were a group of English Protestants in the 16th and 17th centuries, which sought to purify the Church of England of what they considered to be Catholic practices, maintaining that the church was only partially reformed. Puritanism in this sense was founded by some of the returning clergy exiled under Mary I shortly after the accession of Elizabeth I in 1558, as an activist movement within the Church of England.

Puritans were blocked from changing the established church from within, and were severely restricted in England by laws controlling the practice of religion. Their beliefs, however, were transported by the emigration of congregations to the Netherlands (and later to New England), and by evangelical clergy to Ireland (and later into Wales), and were spread into lay society and parts of the educational system, particularly certain colleges of the University of Cambridge. The first Protestant sermon delivered in England was in Cambridge, with the pulpit that this sermon was delivered from surviving to today. They took on distinctive beliefs about clerical dress and in opposition to the episcopal system, particularly after the 1619 conclusions of the Synod of Dort they were resisted by the English bishops. They largely adopted Sabbatarianism in the 17th century, and were influenced by millennialism.

They formed, and identified with various religious groups advocating greater purity of worship and doctrine, as well as personal and group piety. Puritans adopted a Reformed theology, but they also took note of radical criticisms of Zwingli in Zurich and Calvin in Geneva. In church polity, some advocated for separation from all other Christians, in favor of autonomous gathered churches. These separatist and independent strands of Puritanism became prominent in the 1640s. Although the English Civil War (which expanded into the Wars of the Three Kingdoms) began over a contest for political power between the King of England and the House of Commons, it divided the country along religious lines as episcopalians within the Church of England sided with the Crown and Presbyterians and Independents supported Parliament (after the defeat of the Royalists, the House of Lords as well as the Monarch were removed from the political structure of the state to create the Commonwealth). The supporters of a Presbyterian polity in the Westminster Assembly were unable to forge a new English national church, and the Parliamentary New Model Army, which was made up primarily of Independents, under Oliver Cromwell first purged Parliament, then abolished it and established The Protectorate.

England's trans-Atlantic colonies in the war followed varying paths depending on their internal demographics. In the older colonies, which included Virginia (1607) and its offshoot Bermuda (1612), as well as Barbados and Antigua in the West Indies (collectively the targets in 1650 of An Act for prohibiting Trade with the Barbadoes, Virginia, Bermuda and Antego), Episcopalians remained the dominant church faction and the colonies remained Royalist 'til conquered or compelled to accept the new political order. In Bermuda, with control of the local government and the army (nine infantry companies of Militia plus coastal artillery), the Royalists forced Parliament-backing religious Independents into exile to settle the Bahamas as the Eleutheran Adventurers.

Episcopalian was re-established following the Restoration. A century later, non-conforming Protestants, along with the Protestant refugees from continental Europe, were to be among the primary instigators of the war of secession that led to the founding of the United States of America.

=== Neo-orthodoxy and paleo-orthodoxy ===
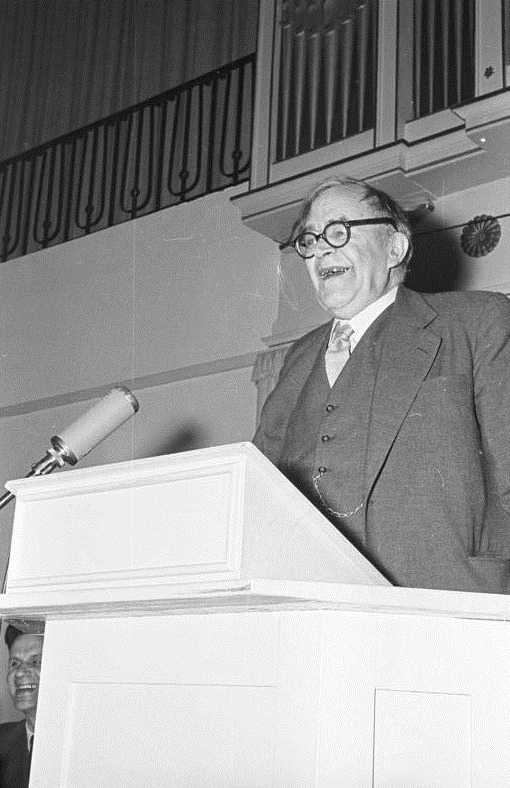
Karl Barth, often regarded as the greatest Protestant theologian of the 20th century

A non-fundamentalist rejection of liberal Christianity along the lines of the Christian existentialism of Søren Kierkegaard, who attacked the Hegelian state churches of his day for "dead orthodoxy", neo-orthodoxy is associated primarily with Karl Barth, Jürgen Moltmann, and Dietrich Bonhoeffer. Neo-orthodoxy sought to counteract the tendency of liberal theology to make theological accommodations to modern scientific perspectives. Sometimes called "crisis theology", in the existentialist sense of the word "crisis," it is also sometimes called neo-evangelicalism, which uses the sense of "evangelical" pertaining to continental European Protestants rather than American evangelicalism. "Evangelical" was the originally preferred label used by Lutherans and Calvinists, but it was replaced by the names some Catholics used to label a heresy with the name of its founder.

Paleo-orthodoxy is a movement similar in some respects to neo-evangelicalism but emphasizing the ancient Christian consensus of the undivided church of the first millennium AD, including in particular the early creeds and church councils as a means of properly understanding the scriptures. This movement is cross-denominational. A prominent theologian in this group is Thomas Oden, a Methodist.

=== Christian fundamentalism ===
In reaction to liberal Bible critique, fundamentalism arose in the 20th century, primarily in the United States, among those denominations most affected by Evangelicalism. Fundamentalist theology tends to stress Biblical inerrancy and Biblical literalism.

Toward the end of the 20th century, some have tended to confuse evangelicalism and fundamentalism; however, the labels represent very distinct differences of approach that both groups are diligent to maintain, although because of fundamentalism's dramatically smaller size it often gets classified simply as an ultra-conservative branch of evangelicalism.

=== Modernism and liberalism ===
Modernism and liberalism do not constitute rigorous and well-defined schools of theology, but are rather an inclination by some writers and teachers to integrate Christian thought into the spirit of the Age of Enlightenment. New understandings of history and the natural sciences of the day led directly to new approaches to theology. Its opposition to the fundamentalist teaching resulted in religious debates, such as the Fundamentalist–Modernist Controversy within the Presbyterian Church in the United States of America in the 1920s.

== Protestant culture ==
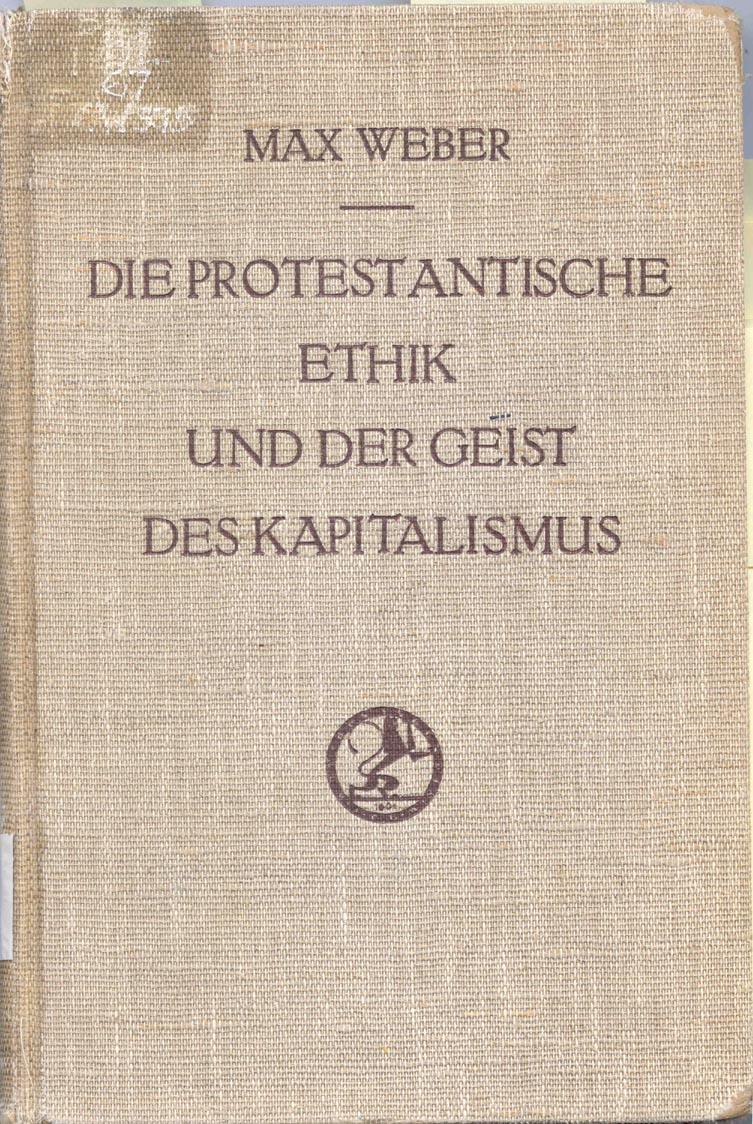
Max Weber's The Protestant Ethic and the Spirit of Capitalism

Although the Reformation was a religious movement, it also had a strong impact on all other aspects of life, including marriage and family, education, the humanities and sciences, the political and social order, the economy, and the arts. Protestant churches reject the idea of a celibate priesthood and thus allow their clergy to marry. Many of their families contributed to the development of intellectual elites in their countries. Since about 1950, women have entered the ministry in most mainline Protestant churches, and some have assumed leading positions (e.g. bishops).

Protestantism has promoted economic growth and entrepreneurship, especially in the period after the Scientific and the Industrial Revolution. Scholars have identified a positive correlation between the rise of Protestantism and human capital formation, work ethic, economic development, the rise of early experimental science, and the development of the state system.

As the Reformers wanted all members of the church to be able to read the Bible, education on all levels was strongly encouraged. By the middle of the eighteenth century, the literacy rate in England was about 60 percent, in Scotland 65 percent, and in Sweden 80 percent. Colleges and universities were founded. For example, the Puritans who established Massachusetts Bay Colony in 1628 founded Harvard College only eight years later. About a dozen other colleges followed in the 18th century, including Yale (1701). Pennsylvania also became a center of learning.

Members of mainline Protestant denominations have played leadership roles in many aspects of American life, including politics, business, science, the arts, and education. They founded most of the country's leading institutes of higher education.

=== Visitation Articles ===
In the Visitation Articles, also known as the first Protestant Confession of Faith, it declared that "we do not send this forth as a rigid command, lest we set up new papal decrees, but as a history, as a witness of our faith and he expresses the hope that all who hold to the Gospel will thankfully accept it until God shall bring something better." These articles helped serve as a way to document the Lutheran faith and its doctrines. In 1538 and 1545, Luther published new versions of these articles. Luther also added work to The Three Symbols (1538) stating: "I have observed in all histories of the Universal Christian Church that all those who hold to the cardinal doctrines of Jesus Christ have remained sure and steadfast in the Christian faith, and even if they have erred and come short in other respects, they are still preserved." Stating that by following Jesus Christ (specifically with the Lutheran practices in this case) one will be saved.

=== Thought and work ethic ===
The Protestant concept of God and man allows believers to use all their God-given faculties, including the power of reason. That means that they are allowed to explore God's creation and, according to Genesis 2:15, make use of it in a responsible and sustainable way. Thus a cultural climate was created that greatly enhanced the development of the humanities and the sciences. Another consequence of the Protestant understanding of man is that the believers, in gratitude for their election and redemption in Christ, are to follow God's commandments. Industry, frugality, calling, discipline, and a strong sense of responsibility are at the heart of their moral code. In particular, Calvin rejected luxury. Therefore, craftsmen, industrialists, and other businessmen were able to reinvest the greater part of their profits in the most efficient machinery and the most modern production methods that were based on progress in the sciences and technology. As a result, productivity grew, which led to increased profits and enabled employers to pay higher wages. In this way, the economy, the sciences, and technology reinforced each other. The chance to participate in the economic success of technological inventions was a strong incentive to both inventors and investors. The Protestant work ethic was an important force behind the unplanned and uncoordinated mass action that influenced the development of capitalism and the Industrial Revolution. This idea is also known as the "Protestant ethic thesis".

However, eminent historian Fernand Braudel (d. 1985), a leader of the important Annales School wrote, "all historians have opposed this tenuous theory [the Protestant Ethic], although they have not managed to be rid of it once and for all. Yet it is clearly false. The northern countries took over the place that earlier had been so long and brilliantly been occupied by the old capitalist centers of the Mediterranean. They invented nothing, either in technology or business management." Social scientist Rodney Stark moreover comments that "during their critical period of economic development, these northern centers of capitalism were Catholic, not Protestant—the Reformation still lay well into the future", while British historian Hugh Trevor-Roper (d. 2003) said, "The idea that large-scale industrial capitalism was ideologically impossible before the Reformation is exploded by the simple fact that it existed."

Episcopalians and Presbyterians, as well as other WASPs, tend to be considerably wealthier and better educated (having graduate and post-graduate degrees per capita) than most other religious groups in United States, and are disproportionately represented in the upper reaches of American business, law and politics, especially the Republican Party. Numbers of the most wealthy and affluent American families as the Vanderbilts, the Astors, Rockefellers, Du Ponts, Roosevelts, Forbes, Fords, Whitneys, Mellons, the Morgans and Harrimans are Mainline Protestant families.

=== Science ===
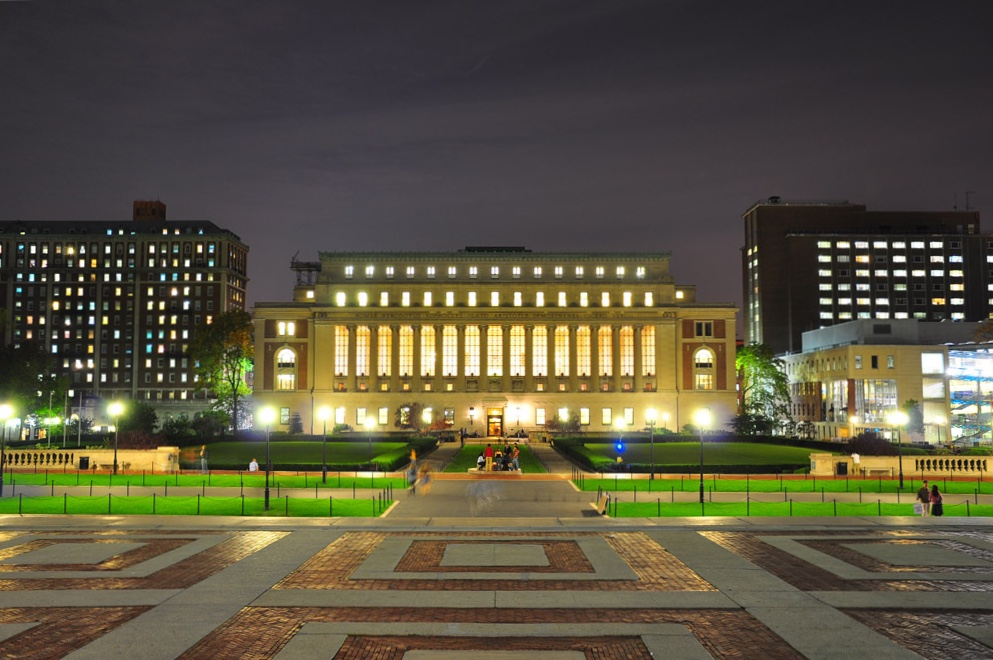
Columbia University, an Ivy League university in New York City, was initially established by the Church of England.

Protestantism has had an important influence on science. According to the Merton Thesis, there was a positive correlation between the rise of English Puritanism and German Pietism on the one hand and early experimental science on the other. The Merton Thesis has two separate parts: Firstly, it presents a theory that science changes due to an accumulation of observations and improvement in experimental technique and methodology; secondly, it puts forward the argument that the popularity of science in 17th-century England and the religious demography of the Royal Society (English scientists of that time were predominantly Puritans or other Protestants) can be explained by a correlation between Protestantism and the scientific values. Merton focused on English Puritanism and German Pietism as having been responsible for the development of the Scientific Revolution of the 17th and 18th centuries. He explained that the connection between religious affiliation and interest in science was the result of a significant synergy between the ascetic Protestant values and those of modern science. Protestant values encouraged scientific research by allowing science to identify God's influence on the world—his creation—and thus providing a religious justification for scientific research.

According to Scientific Elite: Nobel Laureates in the United States by Harriet Zuckerman, a review of American Nobel Prizes awarded between 1901 and 1972, 72% of American Nobel Prize laureates identified a Protestant background. Overall, 84% of all the Nobel Prizes awarded to Americans in Chemistry, 60% in Medicine, and 59% in Physics between 1901 and 1972 were won by Protestants.

According to 100 Years of Nobel Prize (2005), a review of Nobel Prizes awarded between 1901 and 2000, 65% of Nobel Prize Laureates, have identified Christianity in its various forms as their religious preference (423 prizes). While 32% have identified with Protestantism in its various forms (208 prizes), although Protestants are 12% to 13% of the world's population.

=== Government ===
During the Middle Ages, the Church and the worldly authorities were closely related. Martin Luther separated the religious and the worldly realms in principle (doctrine of the two kingdoms). The believers were obliged to use reason to govern the worldly sphere in an orderly and peaceful way. Luther's doctrine of the priesthood of all believers upgraded the role of laymen in the church considerably. The members of a congregation had the right to elect a minister and, if necessary, to vote for his dismissal (Treatise On the right and authority of a Christian assembly or congregation to judge all doctrines and to call, install and dismiss teachers, as testified in Scripture; 1523). Calvin strengthened this basically democratic approach by including elected laymen (church elders, presbyters) in his representative church government. The Huguenots added regional synods and a national synod, whose members were elected by the congregations, to Calvin's system of church self-government. This system was taken over by the other reformed churches and was adopted by some Lutherans beginning with those in Jülich-Cleves-Berg during the 17th century.

Politically, Calvin favored a mixture of aristocracy and democracy. He appreciated the advantages of democracy: "It is an invaluable gift, if God allows a people to freely elect its own authorities and overlords." Calvin also thought that earthly rulers lose their divine right and must be put down when they rise up against God. To further protect the rights of ordinary people, Calvin suggested separating political powers in a system of checks and balances (separation of powers). Thus he and his followers resisted political absolutism and paved the way for the rise of modern democracy. Besides England, the Netherlands were, under Calvinist leadership, the freest country in Europe in the seventeenth and eighteenth centuries. It granted asylum to philosophers like Baruch Spinoza and Pierre Bayle. Hugo Grotius was able to teach his natural-law theory and a relatively liberal interpretation of the Bible.

Consistent with Calvin's political ideas, Protestants created both the English and the American democracies. In seventeenth-century England, the most important persons and events in this process were the English Civil War, Oliver Cromwell, John Milton, John Locke, the Glorious Revolution, the English Bill of Rights, and the Act of Settlement. Later, the British took their democratic ideals to their colonies, e.g. Australia, New Zealand, and India. In North America, Plymouth Colony (Pilgrim Fathers; 1620) and Massachusetts Bay Colony (1628) practised democratic self-rule and separation of powers. These Congregationalists were convinced that the democratic form of government was the will of God. The Mayflower Compact was a social contract.

=== Rights and liberty ===
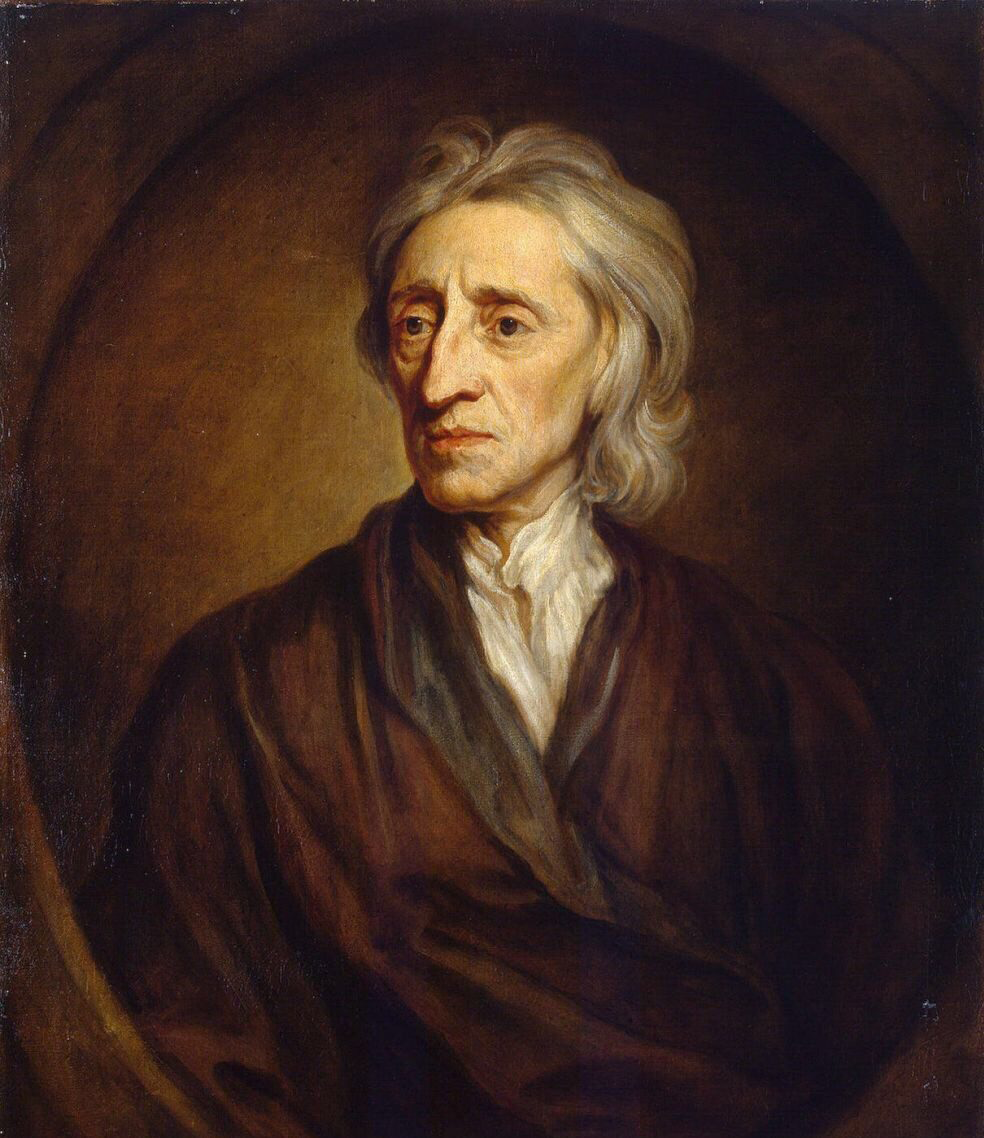
Enlightenment philosopher John Locke argued for individual conscience, free from state control and helped influence the political ideology of Thomas Jefferson and other Founding Fathers of the United States.

Protestants also took the initiative in advocating for religious freedom. Freedom of conscience had a high priority on the theological, philosophical, and political agendas since Luther refused to recant his beliefs before the Diet of the Holy Roman Empire at Worms (1521). In his view, faith was a free work of the Holy Spirit and could, therefore, not be forced on a person. The persecuted Anabaptists and Huguenots demanded freedom of conscience, and they practiced separation of church and state. In the early seventeenth century, Baptists like John Smyth and Thomas Helwys published tracts in defense of religious freedom. Their thinking influenced John Milton and John Locke's stance on tolerance. Under the leadership of Baptist Roger Williams, Congregationalist Thomas Hooker, and Quaker William Penn, respectively, Rhode Island, Connecticut, and Pennsylvania combined democratic constitutions with freedom of religion. These colonies became safe havens for persecuted religious minorities, including Jews.

The United States Declaration of Independence, the United States Constitution, and the American Bill of Rights with its fundamental human rights made this tradition permanent by giving it a legal and political framework. The great majority of American Protestants, both clergy and laity, strongly supported the independence movement. All major Protestant churches were represented in the First and Second Continental Congresses. In the nineteenth and twentieth centuries, the American democracy became a model for numerous other countries and regions throughout the world (e.g., Latin America, Japan, and Germany). The strongest link between the American and French Revolutions was Marquis de Lafayette, an ardent supporter of the American constitutional principles. The French Declaration of the Rights of Man and of the Citizen was mainly based on Lafayette's draft of this document. The Declaration by United Nations and Universal Declaration of Human Rights also echo the American constitutional tradition.

Democracy, social-contract theory, separation of powers, religious freedom, separation of church and state—these achievements of the Reformation and early Protestantism were elaborated on and popularized by Age of Enlightenment thinkers. Some of the philosophers of the English, Scottish, German, and Swiss Enlightenment—Thomas Hobbes, John Locke, John Toland, David Hume, Gottfried Wilhelm Leibniz, Christian Wolff, Immanuel Kant, and Jean-Jacques Rousseau—had Protestant backgrounds. For example, John Locke, whose political thought was based on "a set of Protestant Christian assumptions", derived the equality of all humans, including the equality of the genders ("Adam and Eve"), from Genesis 1, 26–28. As all persons were created equally free, all governments needed "the consent of the governed".

Also, other human rights were advocated for by some Protestants. For example, torture was abolished in Prussia in 1740, slavery in Britain in 1834 and in the United States in 1865 (William Wilberforce, Harriet Beecher Stowe, Abraham Lincoln—against Southern Protestants). Hugo Grotius and Samuel Pufendorf were among the first thinkers who made significant contributions to international law. The Geneva Convention, an important part of humanitarian international law, was largely the work of Henry Dunant, a reformed pietist. He also founded the Red Cross.

=== Social teaching ===
Protestants have founded hospitals, homes for disabled or elderly people, educational institutions, organizations that give aid to developing countries, and other social welfare agencies. In the nineteenth century, throughout the Anglo-American world, numerous dedicated members of all Protestant denominations were active in social reform movements such as the abolition of slavery, prison reforms, and woman suffrage. As an answer to the "social question" of the nineteenth century, Germany under Chancellor Otto von Bismarck introduced insurance programs that led the way to the welfare state (health insurance, accident insurance, disability insurance, old-age pensions). To Bismarck this was "practical Christianity". These programs, too, were copied by many other nations, particularly in the Western world.

=== Liturgy ===
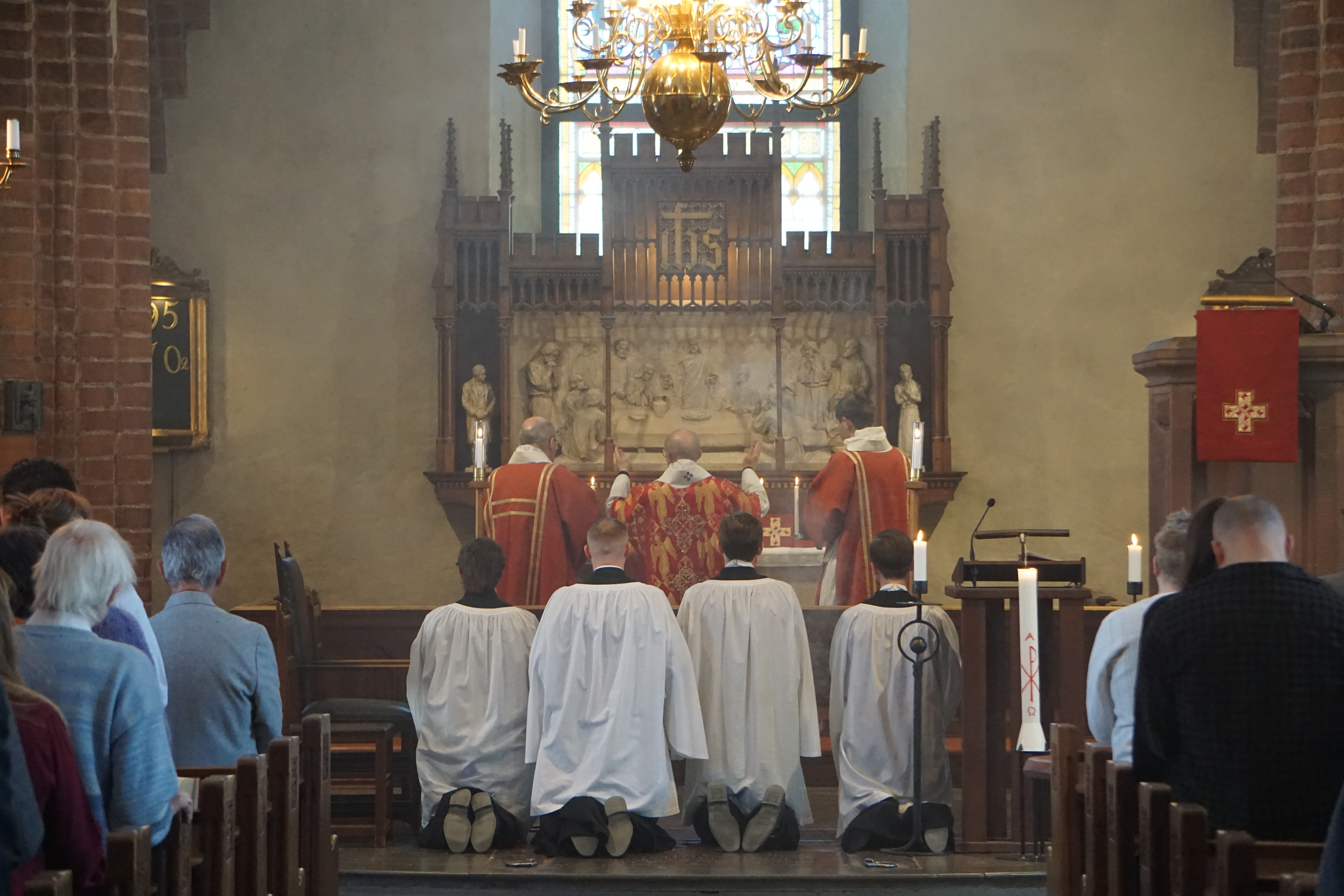
Evangelical-Lutheran priests of the Church of Sweden at the altar during High Mass at Holy Trinity Church in Uppsala on the Feast Day of the Apostles Philip and James the Less, with acolytes kneeling during the consecration

=== Arts ===
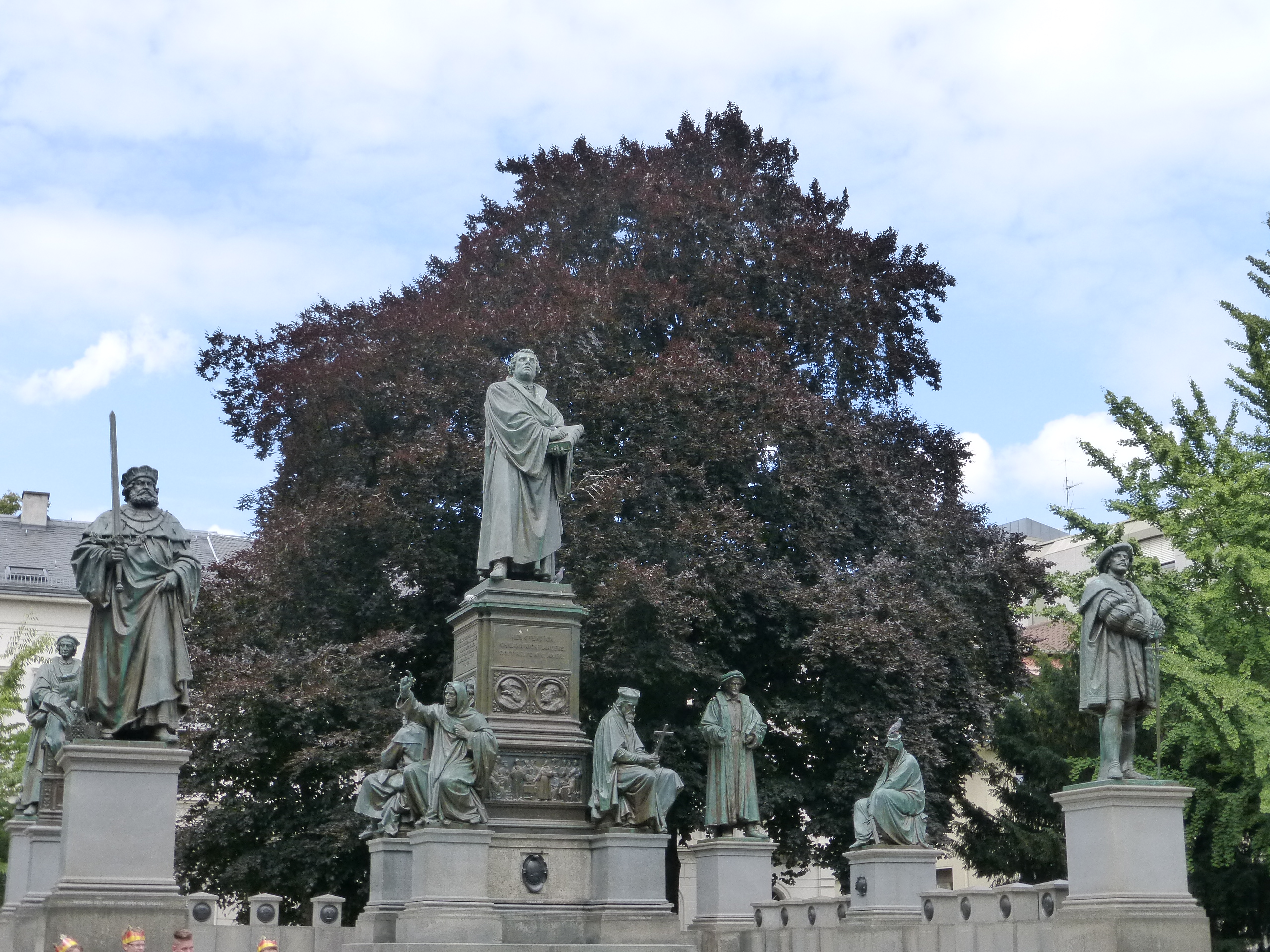
Luther Monument in Worms, which features some of the Reformation's crucial figures

The arts have been strongly inspired by Protestant beliefs.

Martin Luther, Paul Gerhardt, George Wither, Isaac Watts, Charles Wesley, William Cowper, and other authors and composers created well-known church hymns.

Musicians like Heinrich Schütz, Johann Sebastian Bach, George Frideric Handel, Henry Purcell, Johannes Brahms, Philipp Nicolai and Felix Mendelssohn composed great works of music.

Prominent painters with Protestant background were, for example, Albrecht Dürer, Hans Holbein the Younger, Lucas Cranach the Elder, Lucas Cranach the Younger, Rembrandt, and Vincent van Gogh.

World literature was enriched by the works of Edmund Spenser, John Milton, John Bunyan, John Donne, John Dryden, Daniel Defoe, William Wordsworth, Jonathan Swift, Johann Wolfgang Goethe, Friedrich Schiller, Samuel Taylor Coleridge, Edgar Allan Poe, Matthew Arnold, Conrad Ferdinand Meyer, Theodor Fontane, Washington Irving, Robert Browning, Emily Dickinson, Emily Brontë, Charles Dickens, Nathaniel Hawthorne, Thomas Stearns Eliot, John Galsworthy, Thomas Mann, William Faulkner, John Updike, and many others.

== Catholic responses ==
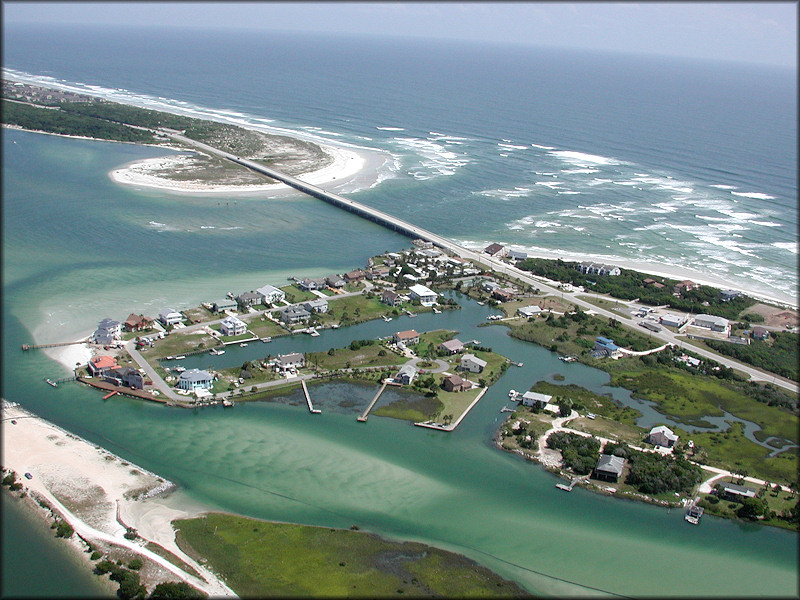
Matanzas Inlet, Florida, where Protestant shipwreck survivors were executed by Menéndez "because they had built it there without Your Majesty's permission, and were disseminating the Lutheran religion"

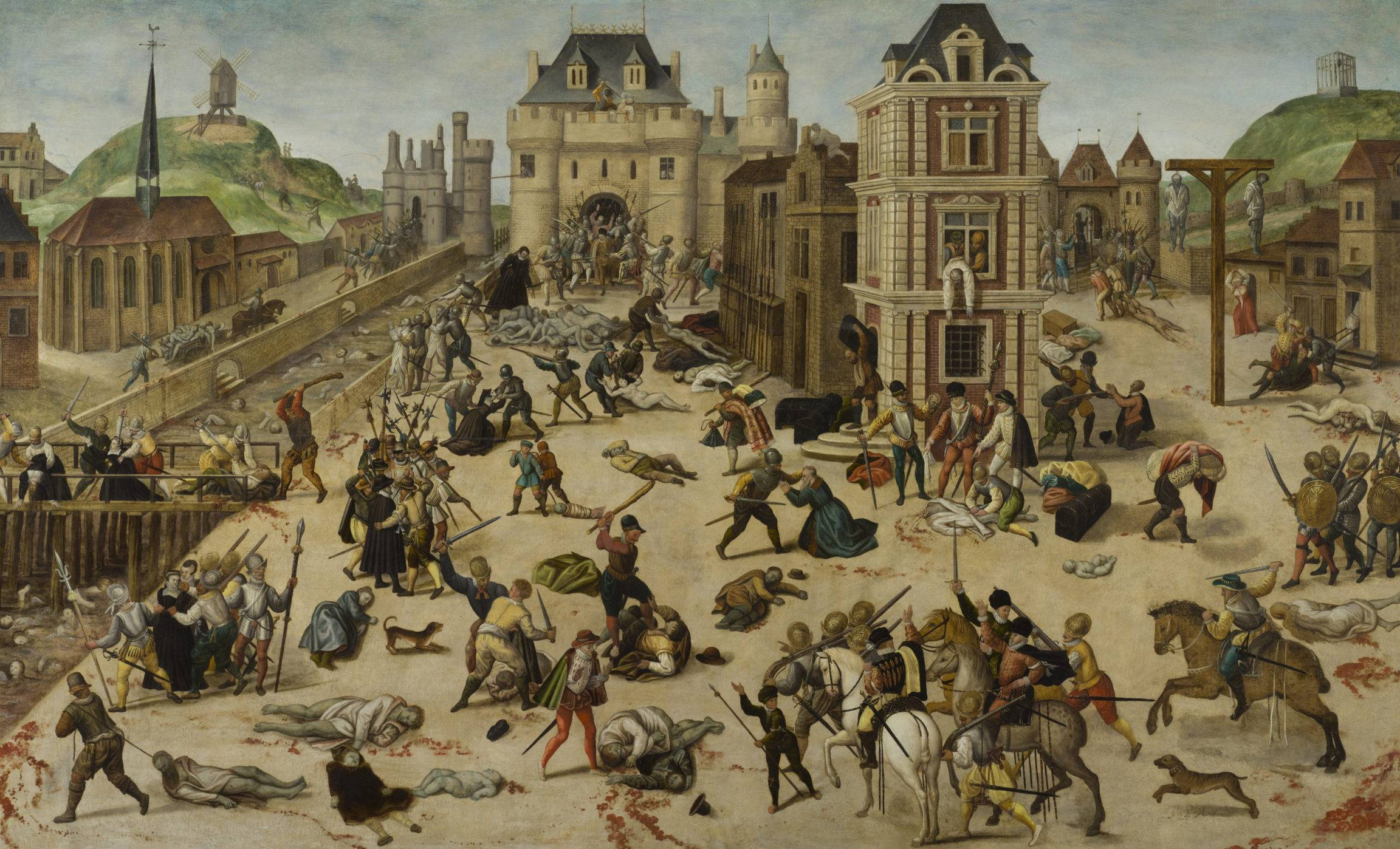
St. Bartholomew's Day massacre of French Protestants, 1572

The view of the Catholic Church is that Protestant denominations cannot be considered churches but rather that they are ecclesial communities or specific faith-believing communities because their ordinances and doctrines are not historically the same as the Catholic sacraments and dogmas, and the Protestant communities have no sacramental ministerial priesthood (Note: this varies among Protestants today. In Sweden, the bishops switched to Lutheranism during the Reformation and there was no break in ordinations. See Apostolic succession in Sweden for more on this. Today, as a result of shared ordinations, the entire Porvoo Communion can trace an unbroken chain of Archbishop-level ordinations going back to before the Reformation through the Swedish line. However, today Rome does not accept these ordinations as valid not because there was a break in the chain, but rather because the occurred apart from papal permission.) and therefore lack true apostolic succession. According to Bishop Hilarion (Alfeyev) the Eastern Orthodox Church shares the same view on the subject.

Contrary to how the Protestant Reformers were often characterized, the concept of a catholic or universal Church was not brushed aside during the Protestant Reformation. On the contrary, the visible unity of the catholic or universal church was seen by the Protestant reformers as an important and essential doctrine of the Reformation. The Magisterial reformers, such as Martin Luther, John Calvin, and Huldrych Zwingli, believed that they were reforming the Catholic Church, which they viewed as having become corrupted. (Note: For more on this, see crypto-paganism and the Great Apostasy. In some areas, pagan Europeans were forced to adopt Christianity at least outwardly, such as after being defeated in battle by Christians. However, outlawing their paganism did not just make it go away. Rather, it persisted as crypto-paganism. For example, Philip Melanchthon, in his 1537 Apology of the Augsburg Confession identified the mechanical character of ex opere operato sacraments as being a form of pagan deterministic philosophy.) Each of them took very seriously the charges of schism and innovation, denying these charges and maintaining that it was the Catholic Church that had left them. The Protestant Reformers formed a new and radically different theological opinion on ecclesiology, that the visible Church is "catholic" (lower-case "c") rather than "Catholic" (upper-case "C"). Accordingly, there is not an indefinite number of parochial, congregational or national churches, constituting, as it were, so many ecclesiastical individualities, but one great spiritual republic of which these various organizations form a part, (Note: This is the position of the Protestants who believe the church is visible. For those who think the church is invisible, organizations are irrelevant, as only individual sinners can be saved.) although they each have very different opinions. This was markedly far-removed from the traditional and historic Catholic understanding that the Catholic Church was the one true Church of Christ. (Note: See Ecclesiology of Augustine of Hippo for an example of a church father who discussed the invisible church.)

Yet, in the Protestant understanding, the visible church is not a genus, so to speak, with so many species under it. (Note: This is a reference to the Marks of the Church in Reformed theology. It is thus you may think of the State, but the visible church is a totum integrale, it is an empire, with an ethereal emperor, rather than a visible one. The churches of the various nationalities constitute the provinces of this empire; and though they are so far independent of each other, yet they are so one, that membership in one is membership in all, and separation from one is separation from all.... This conception of the church, of which, in at least some aspects, we have practically so much lost sight, had a firm hold of the Scottish theologians of the seventeenth century. James Walker in The Theology of Theologians of Scotland. (Edinburgh: Rpt. Knox Press, 1982) Lecture iv. pp. 95–96.) In order to justify their departure (Note: At least at first, Protestants did not depart per se. Rather, they were excommunicated such as in the 1520 Exsurge Domine and the 1521 Edict of Worms. Some Protestants avoided excommunication by living as crypto-Protestants.) from the Catholic Church, Protestants often posited a new argument, (Note: Some Protestants claim the church is visible today, this is a matter of dispute.) saying that there was no real visible Church with divine authority, only a spiritual, invisible, and hidden church—this notion began in the early days of the Protestant Reformation.

Wherever the Magisterial Reformation, which received support from the ruling authorities, took place, the result was a reformed national Protestant church envisioned to be a part of the whole invisible church, but disagreeing, in certain important points of doctrine and doctrine-linked practice, with what had until then been considered the normative reference point on such matters, (Note: The assertion of papal supremacy varied through history. For example, in 381 the First Council of Constantinople recognized the sees of Rome and Constantinople as being equal in authority. Papal supremacy continued to evolve after the Reformation with the First Vatican Council.) namely the Papacy and central authority of the Catholic Church. The Reformed churches thus believed in some form of Catholicity, founded on their doctrines of the five solas and a visible ecclesiastical organization based on the 14th- and 15th-century Conciliar movement, rejecting the papacy and papal infallibility in favor of ecumenical councils, but rejecting the latest ecumenical council, the Council of Trent. (Note: Lutherans did not completely reject Trent. In fact, some attended it, although they were not given a vote. Instead, Martin Chemnitz on the basis that all councils are subject to examination, wrote the Examination of the Council of Trent in which some parts of Trent were accepted and others dissented from.) Religious unity therefore became not one of doctrine and identity but one of invisible character, wherein the unity was one of faith in Jesus Christ, not common identity, doctrine, belief, and collaborative action.

There are Protestants, (Note: In history, Catholic sympathizing Protestants were termed crypto-papists and lived as such because Catholicism was illegal in some areas under the legal principle of cuius regio, eius religio. However, outlawing Catholics did not always force them to emigrate. Instead, they remained continued to influence the dominant church in their area.) especially of the Reformed tradition, that either reject or downplay the designation Protestant because of the negative idea that the word invokes in addition to its primary meaning, preferring the designation Reformed, Evangelical or even Reformed Catholic expressive of what they call a Reformed Catholicity and defending their arguments from the traditional Protestant confessions.

== Ecumenism ==
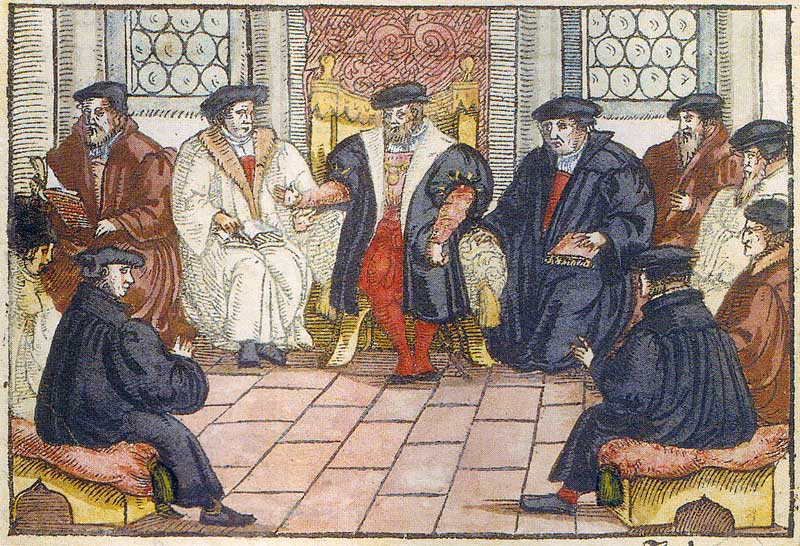
The Marburg Colloquy (1529) was an early attempt at uniting Luther and Zwingli. It failed as both reformers and their delegations could not agree on the sacrament of the Eucharist. Similar discussions were held in 1586 during the Colloquy of Montbéliard and from 1661 to 1663 during the Syncretistic controversy. Anonymous woodcut, 1557.

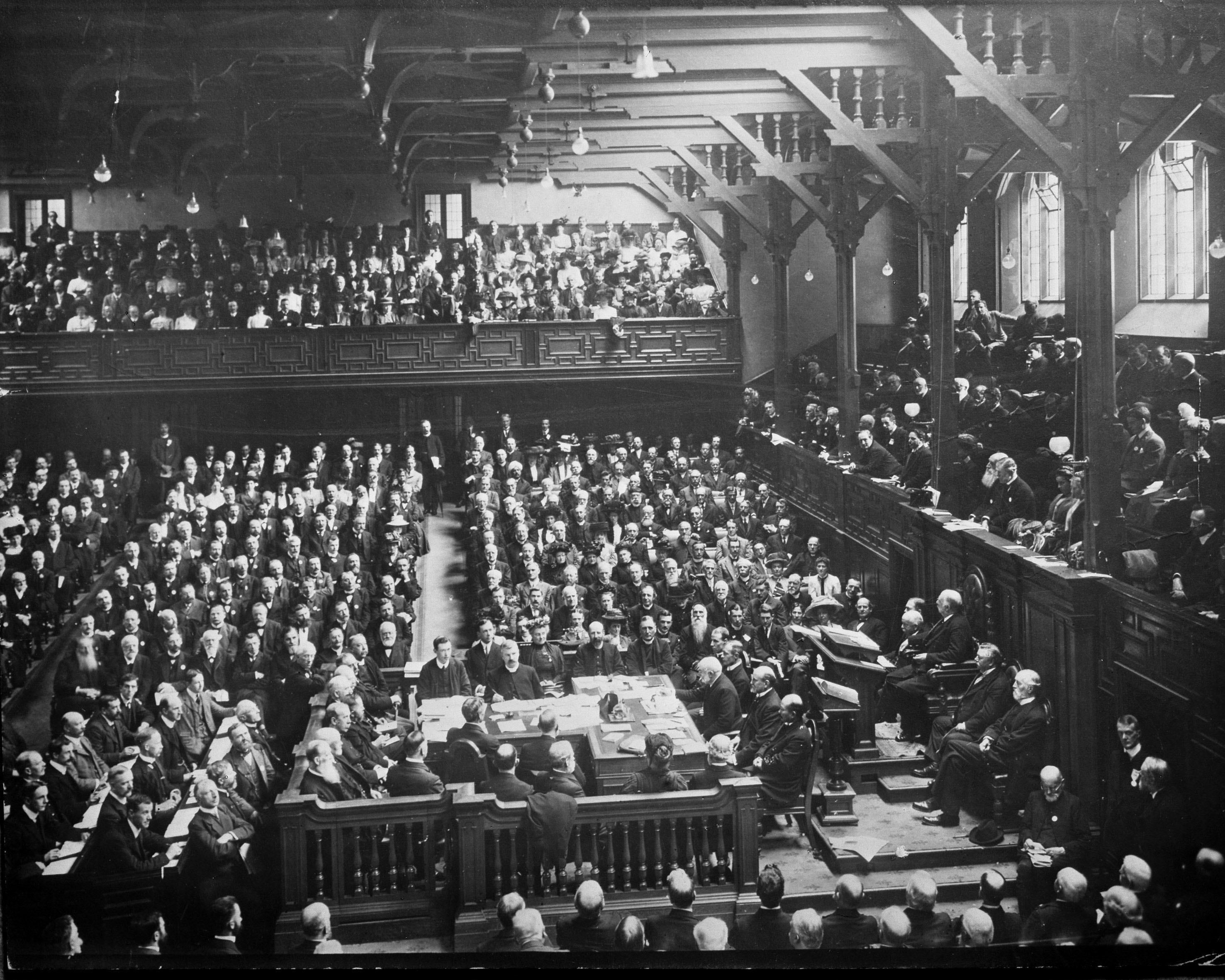
The Edinburgh Missionary Conference is considered the symbolic starting point of the contemporary ecumenical movement.

The ecumenical movement has had an influence on mainline churches, beginning at least in 1910 with the Edinburgh Missionary Conference. Its origins lay in the recognition of the need for cooperation on the mission field in Africa, Asia and Oceania. Since 1948, the World Council of Churches has been influential, but ineffective in creating a united church. There are also ecumenical bodies at regional, national and local levels across the globe; but schisms still far outnumber unifications. One, but not the only expression of the ecumenical movement, has been the move to form united churches, such as the Church of South India, the Church of North India, the US-based United Church of Christ, the United Church of Canada, the Uniting Church in Australia and the United Church of Christ in the Philippines which have rapidly declining memberships. There has been a strong engagement of Orthodox churches in the ecumenical movement, though the reaction of individual Orthodox theologians has ranged from tentative approval of the aim of Christian unity to outright condemnation of the perceived effect of watering down Orthodox doctrine.

A Protestant baptism is held to be valid by the Catholic Church if given with the trinitarian formula and with the intent to baptize. However, as the ordination of Protestant ministers is not recognized due to the lack of apostolic succession and the disunity from Catholic Church, all other sacraments (except marriage) performed by Protestant denominations and ministers are not recognized as valid. Therefore, Protestants desiring full communion with the Catholic Church are not re-baptized (although they are confirmed) and Protestant ministers who become Catholics may be ordained to the priesthood after a period of study.

In 1999, the representatives of Lutheran World Federation and Catholic Church signed the Joint Declaration on the Doctrine of Justification, apparently resolving the conflict over the nature of justification which was at the root of the Protestant Reformation, although Confessional Lutherans reject this statement. This is understandable, since there is no compelling authority within them. On 18 July 2006, delegates to the World Methodist Conference voted unanimously to adopt the Joint Declaration.

== Demographics ==
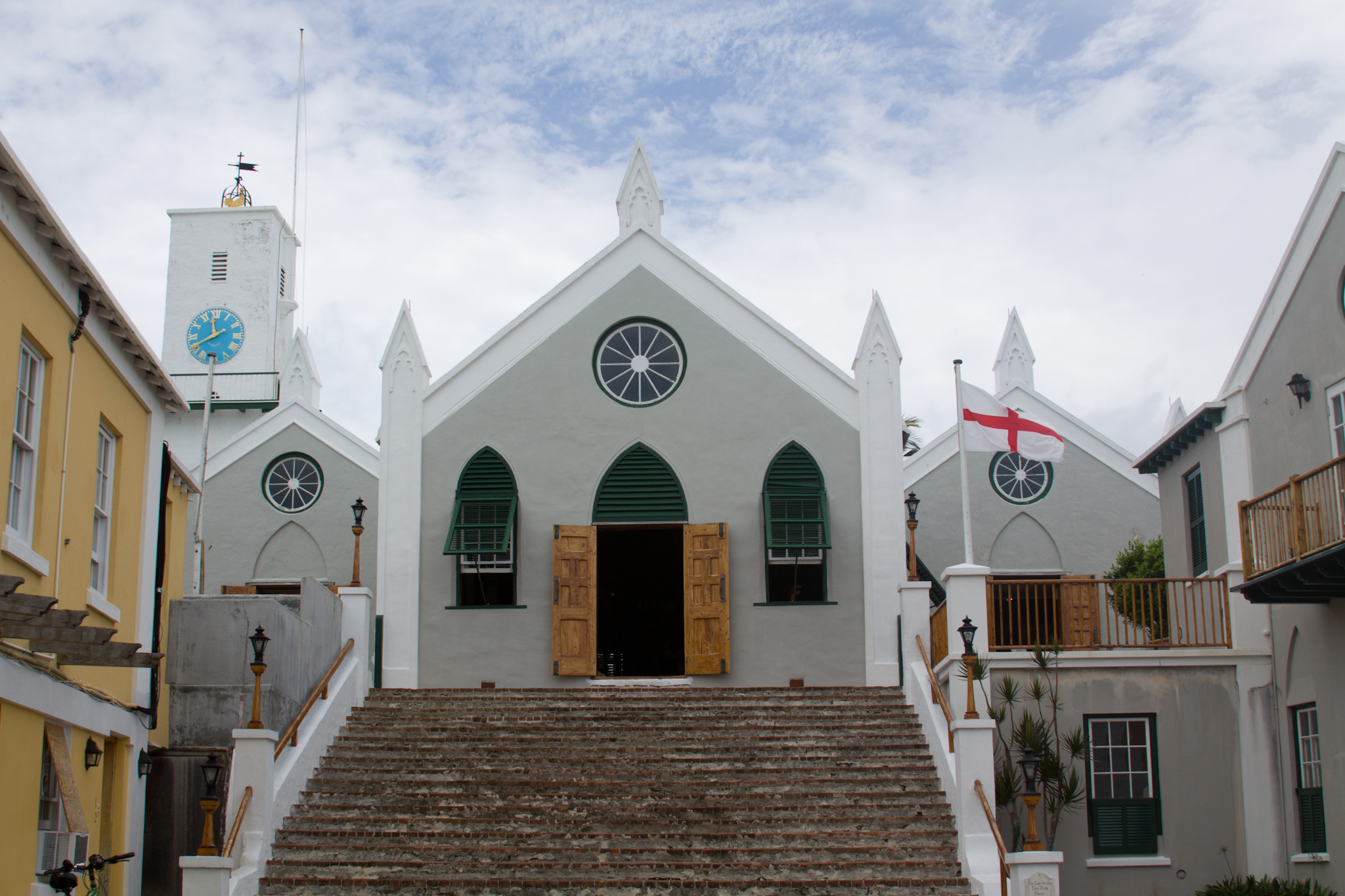
St. Peter's Church in Bermuda, built in 1612, is the oldest surviving Protestant church in the "New World", including the Americas and certain Atlantic Ocean islands. It was the first of nine Parish churches established in Bermuda by the Church of England. Bermuda also has the oldest Presbyterian church outside the British Isles, the Church of Scotland's Christ Church (1719).

Estimates for Protestants worldwide vary from 600 million to 1 billion, (Note: Estimates vary considerably, from 400 up to more than a billion. Hans Hillerbrand estimated a total 2004 Protestant population of 833,457,000, while the World Christian Database estimated 637,856,000 Protestants and 426,370,000 Independents (mostly non-denominational Pentecostals) in early 2026.) among approximately 2.4 billion Christians. (Note: Current sources are in general agreement that Christians make up about 33% of the world's population—slightly over 2.4 billion adherents in mid-2015.) The main reason for this wide range is the lack of a common agreement among scholars as to which denominations constitute Protestantism. For instance, most sources include Anabaptism, Anglicanism, Baptists and non-denominational Christianity as part of Protestantism. However, widely used references like the World Christian Encyclopedia, which has been documenting the changing status of World Christianity over the past 120 years, classifies Independent Christians or non-denominational Pentecostals as a separate category from Protestantism. As such, in 2026, the World Christian Database reported 638 million historic Protestants and 426 million Independent non-denominational Pentecostals.

In 2010, a total of more than 800 million included 300 million in Sub-Saharan Africa, 260 million in the Americas, 140 million in the Asia-Pacific region, 100 million in Europe and 2 million in Middle East-North Africa. Protestants account for at least one third of Christians worldwide and more than one tenth of the total human population. Various estimates put the percentage of Protestants in relation to the total number of world's Christians at 33%, 36%, 36.7%, and 40%, while in relation to the world's population at 11.6% and 13%.

Within Europe, Protestantism remains the most practiced religion in the Nordic countries and the United Kingdom. In other historical Protestant strongholds such as Germany, the Netherlands, Switzerland, Latvia, and Estonia, it remains one of the most popular religions. Although the Czech Republic was the site of one of the most significant pre-reformation movements, there is only a small Protestant population today; mainly due to historical reasons like persecution of Protestants by the Catholic Habsburgs, restrictions during the Communist rule, and also the ongoing secularization. Over the last several decades, religious practice has been declining as secularization has increased. According to a 2019 study about Religiosity in the European Union in 2019 by Eurobarometer, Protestants made up 9% of the EU population. According to Pew Research Center, Protestants constituted nearly one fifth (or 18%) of the continent's Christian population in 2010. Clarke and Beyer estimate that Protestants constituted 15% of all Europeans in 2009, while Noll claims that less than 12% of them lived in Europe in 2010.

Changes in worldwide Protestantism over the last century have been significant. Since 1900, Protestantism has spread rapidly in Africa, Asia, Oceania and Latin America. That caused Protestantism to be called a primarily non-Western religion. Much of the growth has occurred after World War II, when decolonization of Africa and abolition of various restrictions against Protestants in Latin American countries occurred. According to one source, Protestants constituted respectively 2.5%, 2%, 0.5% of Latin Americans, Africans and Asians. In 2000, percentage of Protestants on mentioned continents was 17%, more than 27% and 6%, respectively. According to Mark A. Noll, 79% of Anglicans lived in the United Kingdom in 1910, while most of the remainder was found in the United States and across the British Commonwealth. By 2010, 59% of Anglicans were found in Africa. In 2010, more Protestants lived in India than in the UK or Germany, while Protestants in Brazil were as numerous as those in the UK and Germany combined. Almost as many lived in each of Nigeria and China as in all of Europe. China is home to world's largest Protestant minority. (Note: Estimates for China vary in dozens of millions. Nevertheless, in comparison to the other countries, there is no disagreement that China has the most numerous Protestant minority.)

Protestantism is growing in Africa, Asia, Latin America, and Oceania, while declining in North America and Europe. In France, Protestantism was driven underground from the 1685 revocation of the Edict of Nantes until shortly before the French Revolution, its adherents are now claimed to be stable in number. According to some, Russia is another country to see a Protestant growth.

The United States is home to approximately 20% of the world's Protestants. According to a 2019 study, the Protestant share of U.S. population dropped to 43%, ending its historical status as religion of the majority. The decline is attributed mainly to the dropping membership of the Mainline Protestant churches, while Evangelical Protestant and Black churches are stable or continue to grow.

Protestants have been projected to form a slim majority of the world's total Christian population by 2050 if existing trends continue. (Note: Magisterial Protestant, Independent, Anabaptist and Anglican parties are understood as Protestant as stated previously in the article, as well as in the book: Statistics for the P, I and A megablocs are often combined because they overlap so much-hence the order followed here.) According to other experts such as Hans J. Hillerbrand, Protestants will be as numerous as Catholics. According to Peter L. Berger, popular Protestantism (Note: A flexible term; defined as all forms of Protestantism with the notable exception of the historical denominations deriving from the Protestant Reformation.) is the most dynamic religious movement in the contemporary world, alongside resurgent Islam.

In 2010, the largest Protestant denominational families were historically Pentecostal denominations (11%), Anglican (11%), Lutheran (10%), Baptist (9%), United and uniting churches (unions of different denominations) (7%), Presbyterian or Reformed (7%), Methodist (3%), Adventist (3%), Congregationalist (1%), Brethren (1%), The Salvation Army (<1%) and Moravian (<1%). Other denominations accounted for 38% of Protestants.

Protestant-majority countries in 2010

Countries by percentage of Protestants, 2010

== See also ==
- Anti-Catholicism
- Criticism of Protestantism
- European wars of religion
- Protestantism in Germany
- The Reformation and its influence on church architecture
- Predestination in Protestantism
- Protestantism by country
- Pelagianism
- Semi-Pelagianism
