= Monergism =

View in Christian theology

In Christian theology, monergism primarily denotes the belief that God alone is the agent of human salvation. Divine monergism is most commonly associated with Augustinian, Lutheran and Reformed/Calvinist soteriology, the latter of which includes certain strands of Anglicanism. It is also a key component of some forms of Christian universalism. Secondarily, monergism can also refer to the belief that humans alone determine their salvation. Human monergism is commonly associated with Pelagianism. Both perspectives contrast with synergism, which asserts that divine and human cooperation is essential for the conversion process.

== Definition ==
Monergism derives from the Greek monos (sole) and ergon (work) and refers to a single source acting alone. In Christian theology, it primarily denotes the belief that God is the sole agent in human salvation. This view, known as "divine monergism," is characteristic of Calvinist and Augustinian soteriology. It describes a process in which God alone authors for every step of salvation, without human participation. Monergism can also refer to the belief that humans are the sole agents of their salvation, a view known as "human monergism" and generally associated with Pelagianism. Both perspectives contrast with synergism, which holds that divine and human cooperation is necessary in the conversion process.

== Historical developments ==
=== Human monergism ===
Before Augustine of Hippo (354–430), the synergistic view of salvation was almost universally endorsed. Pelagius (c. 354–418), however, argued that humans could perfectly obey God by their own will. The Pelagian view is therefore referred to as "human monergism".

=== Divine monergism ===
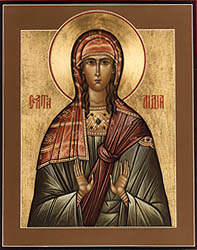
Augustine presents Lydia of Thyatira as an example of monergistic salvation.

Augustine was the first to articulate the concept of divine monergism within Christianity. In response to Pelagianism, he argued that prevenient grace is necessary to prepare the human will for conversion. This view incorporated a compatibilist form of theological determinism, and implied a form of unconditional election. Divine monergism later became a foundational principle in Lutheran theology, most notably expressed in the Formula of Concord (1577). It also played a central role in Calvinist theology, shaping Reformed confessions such as the Canons of Dort (1618–19) and the Westminster Confession of Faith (1646).

== Theological interpretations ==
=== Divine monergism and ordo salutis ===
In orthodox Calvinism, the classical ordo salutis follows a sequence of effectual calling, then regeneration, and finally faith. Lutheranism largely mirrors this sequence. Some theologians argue that because the first steps of effectual calling and regeneration are passive, then the whole conversion must also be entirely passive and monergistic in nature. However, certain Calvinists advocate for a revised ordo, still claimed to uphold monergism, while placing faith before regeneration. A similar modification occurs in Molinist-influenced Calvinist revisions, which likewise reorder the sequence to place faith before regeneration. Despite these differences, both orthodox and revised Calvinist perspectives affirm that the steps of salvation are ultimately determined by God.

=== Synergistic language within a divine monergistic framework ===
In a divine monergistic framework, such as the one found in Calvinism, every stage of the process of human salvation is understood to be monergistic. Nevertheless, some Calvinist theologians sometimes argue that conversion may be described as synergistic. Others extend this synergistic language to sanctification. However, within a monergistic framework, the human will is not understood to function as an independent initiating cause. Consequently, when some Calvinist theologians describe a stage of salvation as synergistic, they typically mean only that the human being is willing and responsible during that stage, without thereby denying divine predetermination. In such cases, "synergism" refers merely to a form of human cooperation grounded in compatibilist assumptions about human agency, while remaining fully determinist in nature.

=== Divine monergism and Christian universalism ===
Within a Christian worldview affirming divine monergism, such as that of the Augustinian or the Reformed traditions, God can theoretically elect whom He wills based on His sovereignty. If He chose to elect all humans, their past and future sins would be forgiven, and all would irresistibly come to faith during their lifetime. This scenario constitutes a necessary form of Christian universalism, which is rejected by Reformed or Augustinian theologians. They commonly argue that the greatest good occurs when God is maximally glorified, and they believe this does not happen in a world where everyone is saved. Nevertheless, some Protestant thinkers, such as Thomas Talbott, have proposed an alternative form of monergistic universalism. According to this view, God's irresistible grace will ultimately extend to every individual—even beyond death—thus explaining why not all are brought to faith within their lifetimes. A further development of this idea appears in another form of monergistic universalism, articulated for example by Hosea Ballou. In this framework, salvation is granted independently of personal faith and remains accessible to all at any point in time.

=== Human monergism ===
In a human monergistic framework, the human is the sole cause of the actions leading to salvation. God is understood only to grant initial spiritual capacities, without further involvement in the process. Pelagius taught that a human's ability to act correctly was a gift of God. He considered grace to consist primarily of external instructions, typically through the Scriptures. According to this interpretation, an element of grace necessary for salvation can be found in Pelagius’s understanding, and his view may be described as synergistic for this reason. However, for Pelagius, “grace” does not involve any direct divine action during a man's life, remaining external to him. Consequently, theologians generally associate this position with human monergism.

== Denominational views ==
=== Lutheran theology ===
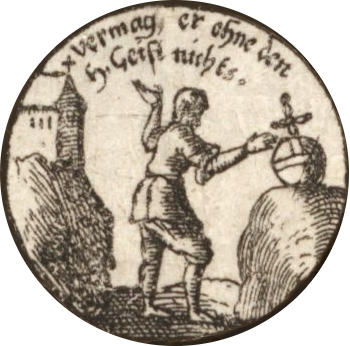
An illustration of Article XVIII ('Of Free Will') of the Augsburg Confession.

Martin Luther (1483–1546) limited monergism strictly to soteriological aspects. He asserted that monergism applied to both election (to salvation) and reprobation. Philip Melanchthon (1497–1560), however, rejected monergism after Luther's death in favor of synergism. Melanchthon's stance influenced many Lutherans of his time throughout Europe to adopt synergism. The "synergistic controversy" arose when Gnesio-Lutherans, citing Luther's monergistic stance, opposed John Pfeffinger's synergistic views on the role of human will in conversion.

By 1580, Melanchthon's view had lost prominence, and the Book of Concord (1580) affirmed soteriological monergism in relation to election (to salvation), but explicitly rejected its application to reprobation. Accordingly, the contemporary Lutheran Church continues to uphold this view. While monergism remains the official stance, Lutheran history includes both monergist and synergist views.

Concerning preservation, the Lutheran confessions state that election unto salvation is, among other things, a cause of final perseverance. Similarly, sanctification is generally described as monergistic. This implies that sanctification is caused by the Holy Spirit, as the Small Catechism emphasizes. More precisely, the Formula of Concord states that, within this process, humans consciously and willingly collaborate with the Holy Spirit. This does not contradict that, within a soteriological monergistic framework, God is understood as the ultimate cause of the human actions, including sanctification.

=== Reformed theology ===
In orthodox Reformed theology, divine monergism is understood as operating through an exhaustive divine providence. For example, Huldrych Zwingli (1484–1531) viewed that everything, including human salvation and reprobation, was determined by God. In contrast, "libertarian Calvinism", a revision described by Oliver D. Crisp in his book Deviant Calvinism (2014), is a soteriological monergism. Historically, this perspective has remained a minority view within Calvinism.

=== Anglican theology ===
Anglicanism originally inclined toward monergism due to its Lutheran and Calvinist heritage, but it eventually accommodated both monergistic and synergistic interpretations. The Thirty-nine Articles of Religion, finalized in 1571, serve as the confession of faith for the Anglican tradition. They reflect a complex interplay of Calvinist influence, Catholic practice, and intentional ambiguity within individual articles. Today, in some Anglican denominations, clergy are required to acknowledge the Articles, while in others, they are not.

Anglicanism has historically leaned more toward monergism, particularly in its early phases. Early Anglican leaders such as Thomas Cranmer (1489–1556) held Reformed views that significantly shaped the Church's initial doctrinal direction. However, following the Stuart Restoration (1660) through the mid-18th century, Calvinist theology became less prominent within Anglicanism. Afterward, the Evangelical movement within Anglicanism revived and emphasized its Reformed roots. Related groups like the Church Society tend to interpret Article 10 of the Thirty-nine Articles in a monergistic sense.

Conversely, High church and Anglo-Catholic traditions have tended toward synergism, drawing on the theology of the early Church Fathers and emphasizing the sacramental life, human free will, and cooperation with divine grace. Proto-Arminian figure Lancelot Andrewes (1555–1626) or Jeremy Taylor upheld the importance of the human response to God’s call. In the 18th and 19th centuries, theologians such as George Pretyman Tomline and Harold Browne also interpreted Article 10 in a synergistic light. In the 20th century, this synergistic stance was famously exemplified by Anglican writer C. S. Lewis, who emphasized the necessity of human free will in cooperating with divine grace.

== Objections ==
Since all forms of divine monergism (both soteriological and exhaustive) rely on unconditional election, God determines the fate of individuals, whether felicity or reprobation, either directly or indirectly. When divine monergism permits the existence of some reprobates, it can give the impression that God's love is both restricted and arbitrary.

Monoenergism, the heretical belief that Christ had only one "energy" (energeia), was propagated during the first half of the 7th century. In historical soteriological forms of divine monergism, Jesus was seen as being predetermined to obey the Father's will. Consequently, the Father alone was the commanding energy, to which Christ's energy was entirely subjected. Some have suggested that monergism logically entails monoenergism. Conversely, if Christ was not predetermined, this would allow for the possibility of a non-monoenergistic synergy.

== See also ==
- Augustinian soteriology
- Jansenism
- Monoenergism
- Synergism
- Theological determinism
