= Ordo salutis =

Theological concepts in Christianity

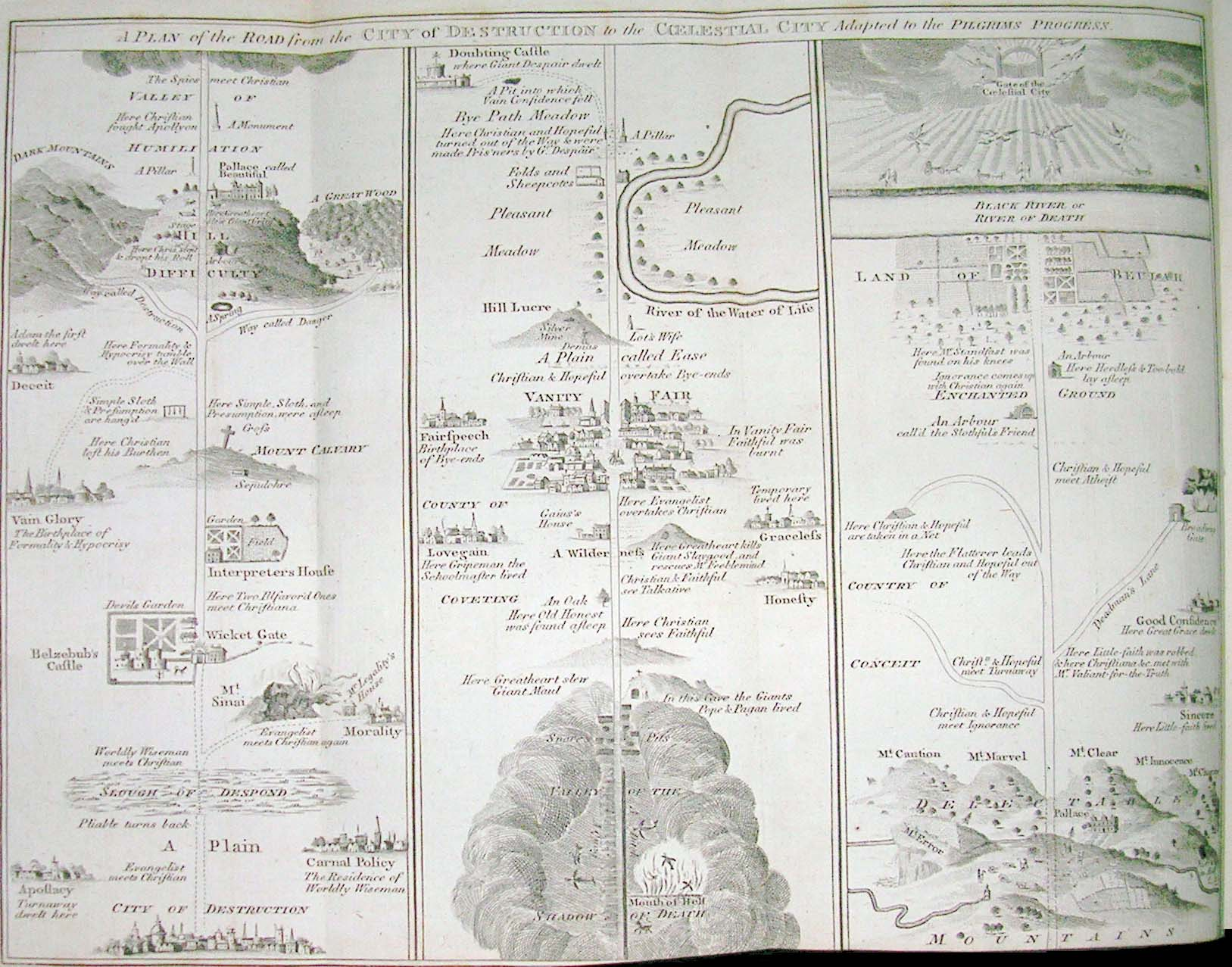
A map from The Pilgrim's Progress by John Bunyan, which described salvation allegorically as the journey of a pilgrim

The term ordo salutis (Latin: "order of salvation") refers to a series of conceptual steps within the Christian doctrine of salvation.

== Definition ==
Ordo salutis has been defined as "a technical term of Protestant dogmatics to designate the consecutive steps in the work of the Holy Spirit in the appropriation of salvation". Although within Christian theology there is a certain sense in which the phases of salvation are sequential, some elements are understood to occur progressively and others instantaneously. Furthermore, some steps within the "order of salvation" are regarded as objective (or monergistic), performed solely by God, while others are considered subjective (or synergistic), involving humanity. Christians prior to the Protestant Reformation, while not using the exact phrase, sought to order the elements of salvation. The term ordo salutis was first used by Lutheran theologians in the mid-1720s.

== Different schemes ==
Calvinist:

- Calling
- Regeneration
- Faith
- Repentance
- Justification
- Sanctification
- Perseverance
- Glorification

Lutheran:

- Calling
- Illumination
- Repentance
- Regeneration
- Justification
- Mystical Union
- Sanctification
- Conservation

Arminian/Wesleyan:

- Calling
- Repentance
- Faith
- Justification
- Regeneration
- Sanctification
- Preservation
- Glorification

== Criticism and support ==
Some more recent theologians, such as Karl Barth, G. C. Berkouwer and Herman Ridderbos, have criticised the idea of an "order of salvation". For example, Barth sees the ordo salutis as running the risk of "psychologizing" salvation and Berkouwer is concerned the ordering does not do justice to the "fullness" of salvation. Another criticism comes from Richard Gaffin who asserts "that union with Christ is for Paul the overarching factor within which the various elements of the order of Salvation are to be considered".

Those who want to sustain an idea of sequential order in salvation appeal to Romans 8:29–30 (KJV);

For whom he did foreknow, he also did predestinate [to be] conformed to the image of his Son, that he might be the firstborn among many brethren. Moreover whom he did predestinate, them he also called: and whom he called, them he also justified: and whom he justified, them he also glorified.

The concept of an ordered sequence of soteriological doctrines was also an important part of the construction of the Westminster Confession. In addition, Hendrikus Berkhof observes that Christians cannot avoid thinking "coherently" about the particular elements of salvation.
