= Synergism =

Christian theology concerning the will in salvation

In Christian theology, synergism refers to the cooperative effort between God and humanity in the process of salvation. Before Augustine of Hippo (354–430), synergism was almost universally endorsed. Later, it came to be reflected in the so-called semi-Pelagian position and the semi-Augustinian stance affirmed by the Second Council of Orange (529). Synergism is affirmed by both the Catholic Church and Eastern Orthodoxy. It is also present in various Protestant denominations, such as Anabaptist churches, and is particularly prominent in those influenced by Arminian theology, such as the Methodist churches.

== Definition ==
Synergism comes from the Greek syn (with) and ergon (work) and refers to two or more sources working together. In Christian theology, it describes the cooperative effort between God and humanity in the process of salvation. It implies a free human participation in salvation.

== Theology ==
=== Historical developments ===
Before Augustine (354–430), the synergistic view of salvation was almost universally endorsed.

Pelagius (c. 354–418), however, argued that humans could perfectly obey God by their own will. The Pelagian view is therefore referred to as "human monergism". This view was condemned at the Council of Carthage (418) and Ephesus (431).

In response, Augustine proposed a view in which God is the ultimate cause of all human actions, a compatibilist form of theological determinism. The Augustinian view is therefore referred to as "divine monergism". However, Augustinian soteriology implied double predestination, which was condemned by the Council of Arles (475).

During this period, a moderate form of Pelagianism emerged, later termed semi-Pelagianism. This view asserted that human will initiates salvation, rather than divine grace. The semi-Pelagian view is therefore described as "human-initiated synergism".

In 529, the Second Council of Orange addressed semi-Pelagianism and declared that even the inception of faith is a result of God’s grace. This highlights the role of prevenient grace enabling human belief. This view, often referred to as "semi-Augustinian," is therefore described as "God-initiated synergism". The Council also rejected predestination to evil.

=== Characterization of the Pelagian–Augustinian salvation framework ===
The Pelagian–Augustinian framework serves as a key paradigm for understanding contemporary forms of synergism. Augustine argued that prevenient grace is necessary to prepare the human will for conversion. He maintained that God predetermined parents to seek baptism for their newborns, linking water baptism to regeneration. Furthermore, he viewed the divine grace that brings about conversion as unfailing.

The semi-Augustinian stance builds upon Augustinian thought, also associating regeneration with water baptism. However, it rejects predetermination, allowing space for human decision, particularly in the act of faith. Thus, it maintains that vocation and the gift of faith are divine actions through prevenient grace, while faith itself is a human action, and regeneration remains a divine action. The semi-Pelagian position holds that vocation and conversion through faith are human actions, while the "increase of faith" bringing regeneration is a divine action. In Pelagianism, humans possess the innate capacity to obey God. Consequently, all steps of salvation are voluntary human actions.

The rationale outlined above is synthesized in the following table:

Comparison of the authors' actions in the Pelagian–Augustinian salvation frameworks
Framework	Augustinianism	Semi-Augustinianism	Semi-Pelagianism	Pelagianism
Salvation process type	Divine monergism	God-initiated synergism	Human-initiated synergism	Human monergism
Vocation	God	God	Human	Human
Conversion (gift of faith)	God	God	Human	Human
Conversion (faith)	God	Human	Human	Human
Regeneration	God	God	God	Human

== Views among Christian denominations ==
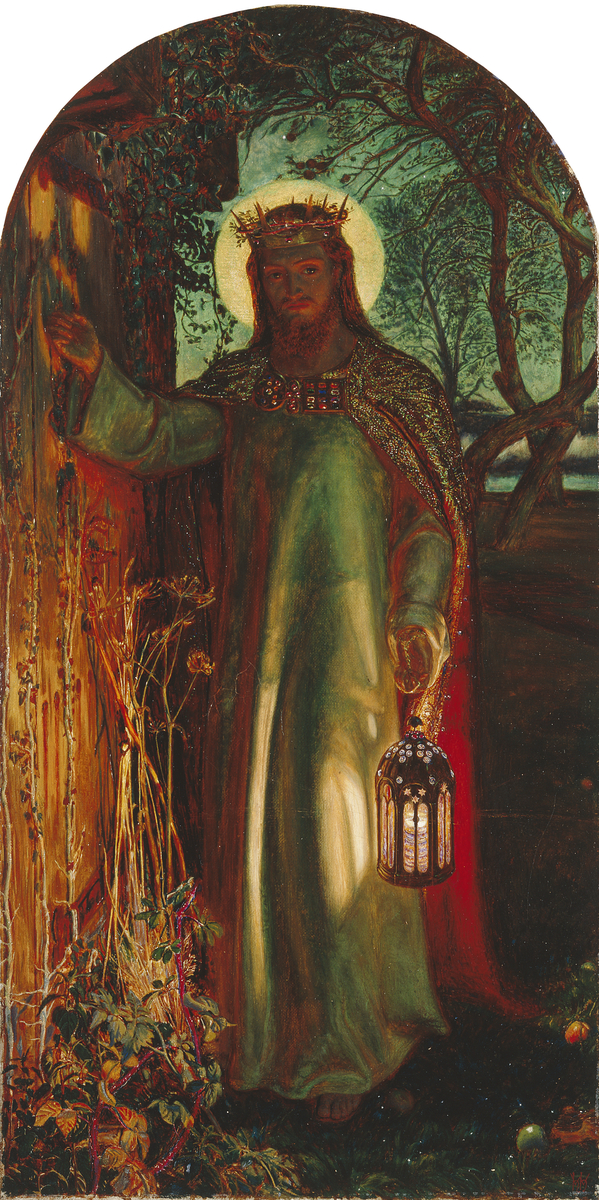
Synergists compare God's role in salvation to Christ "standing at the door" (The Light of the World by William Holman Hunt).

=== Denominations traditionally upholding synergism ===
==== Catholic theology ====
Synergism is an important part of the salvation theology of the Catholic Church. Following the Second Council of Orange (529), the Council of Trent (1545–63) reaffirmed the resistibility of prevenient grace and its synergistic nature. The Catechism of the Catholic Church (1992) teaches that the ability of the human will to respond to divine grace is itself conferred by grace. This synergistic process applies to both justification and sanctification. The sacraments of the Catholic Church such as baptism and the Eucharist, are part of God's grace and are thus a vital element in the synergistic process of salvation.

==== Eastern Orthodox theology ====
In Eastern Orthodox theology, God's grace and the human response work together in a "cooperation" or "synergy". This perspective has historically presented less theological tension on this issue compared to the Christian West. In the salvation process, divine grace always precedes any human action. Man possesses gnomic will, often interpreted as implying a form of libertarian freedom, and must consciously respond to divine grace. This understanding is broadly comparable, though not identical to the Arminian protestant synergism. The Orthodox synergistic process of salvation includes baptism as a response to divine grace. Deification, or theosis, is also an integral part of this process.

==== Anabaptist theology ====
Anabaptists hold to synergism, teaching that "both God and man play real and necessary parts in the reconciling relationship which binds them." Anabaptists have a high view of the moral capacities of humans when "enlivened by the active agency of the Holy Spirit".

==== Arminian theology ====
Christians who adhere to Arminian theology, such as Methodists, believe that salvation is synergistic. Jacobus Arminius first emphasized the role of prevenient grace, which involves a monergistic act of God, followed by "subsequent" act involving a synergistic work. Thus, for Arminians, prevenient grace involves a synergistic process. Similarly, John Wesley held that salvation begins with divine initiative. Additionally, Wesleyan-Arminian theology teaches that both justification and sanctification are synergistic. The Arminian perspective on salvation is often described as "God-initiated synergism". This perspective aligns closely with the main characteristic of the early semi-Augustinian thought.

==== Semi-Pelagian view ====
Semi-Pelagianism is present in many current evangelical denominations. It holds that a person can initiate faith independently, without prevenient grace, while its continuation through regeneration depends on God’s grace. This has led to its characterization as "human-initiated synergism". After the Reformation, Reformed theologians used the term "semi-Pelagianism" to describe both "semi-Pelagianism" and "semi-Augustinianism," the latter being a divine-initiated synergism.

=== Denominations traditionally upholding monergism ===
==== Lutheran theology ====
Martin Luther (1483-1546) limited monergism strictly to soteriological aspects. He asserted that monergism applied to both election (to salvation) and reprobation. Philip Melanchthon (1497-1560), however, rejected monergism after Luther's death in favor of synergism. Melanchthon's stance influenced many Lutherans of his time throughout Europe to adopt synergism. The "synergistic controversy" arose when Gnesio-Lutherans, citing Luther's monergistic stance, opposed John Pfeffinger's synergistic views on the role of the human will in conversion.

By 1580, Melanchthon's view had lost prominence, and the Book of Concord (1580) affirmed soteriological monergism in relation to election (to salvation), but explicitly rejected its application to reprobation. Accordingly, the contemporary Lutheran Church continues to uphold this view. While monergism remains the official stance, Lutheran history includes both monergist and synergist views.

Concerning preservation, the Lutheran confessions state that election unto salvation is, among other things, a cause of final perseverance. Similarly, sanctification is generally described as monergistic. This implies that sanctification is caused by the Holy Spirit, as the Small Catechism emphasizes. More precisely, the Formula of Concord states that, within this process, humans consciously and willingly collaborate with the Holy Spirit. This does not contradict that, within a soteriological monergistic framework, God is understood as the ultimate cause of the human actions, including sanctification.

==== Reformed theology ====
In orthodox Reformed theology, divine monergism is understood as operating through an exhaustive divine providence. For example, Huldrych Zwingli (1484–1531) viewed that everything, including human salvation and reprobation, was determined by God. In contrast, "libertarian Calvinism", a revision described by Oliver D. Crisp in his book Deviant Calvinism (2014), is a soteriological monergism. Historically, this perspective has remained a minority view within Calvinism.

==== Anglican theology ====
Anglicanism originally inclined toward monergism due to its Lutheran and Calvinist heritage, but it eventually accommodated both monergistic and synergistic interpretations. The Thirty-nine Articles of Religion, finalized in 1571, serve as the confession of faith for the Anglican tradition. They reflect a complex interplay of Calvinist influence, Catholic practice, and intentional ambiguity within individual articles. Today, in some Anglican denominations, clergy are required to acknowledge the Articles, while in others, they are not.

Anglicanism has historically leaned more toward monergism, particularly in its early phases. Early Anglican leaders such as Thomas Cranmer (1489–1556) held Reformed views that significantly shaped the Church’s initial doctrinal direction. However, following the Stuart Restoration (1660) through the mid-18th century, Calvinist theology became less prominent within Anglicanism. Afterward, the Evangelical movement within Anglicanism revived and emphasized its Reformed roots. Related groups like the Church Society tend to interpret Article 10 of the Thirty-nine Articles in a monergistic sense.

Conversely, high church and Anglo-Catholic traditions have tended toward synergism, drawing on the theology of the early Church Fathers and emphasizing the sacramental life, human free will, and cooperation with divine grace. Proto-Arminian figure Lancelot Andrewes (1555–1626) or Jeremy Taylor upheld the importance of the human response to God’s call. In the 18th and 19th centuries, theologians such as George Pretyman Tomline and Harold Browne also interpreted Article 10 in a synergistic light. In the 20th century, this synergistic stance was famously exemplified by Anglican writer C. S. Lewis, who emphasized the necessity of human free will in cooperating with divine grace.

== See also ==
- Dyoenergism
- Dyothelitism
- Libertarianism (metaphysics)
- Monoenergism

== Notes and references ==
=== Sources ===
- Allison, Gregg R. (2021). 40 Questions About Roman Catholicism. Grand Rapids, MI: Kregel Publications.
- Augustine (1994). The Works of Saint Augustine: A New Translation for the 21st Century. Translated by Hill, Edmund. Hyde Park, NY: New City Press.
- Barrett, Matthew (2013). Salvation by Grace: The Case for Effectual Calling and Regeneration. Phillipsburg: P & R Publishing.
- Bente, Friedrich (1921). Historical Introductions to the Symbolical Books of the Evangelical Lutheran Church. St. Louis: Concordia Publishing House.
- Bird, Benedict (2021). "The Development Of Augustine's Views On Free Will And Grace, And The Conflicting Claims To Consistency Therewith By John Owen And John Goodwin". Westminster Theological Journal. 83 (1): 73–101.
- Bloesch, Donald G. (2005). The Holy Spirit: Works Gifts. Downers Grove, IL: InterVarsity Press. ISBN 978-0-8308-2755-8.
- Bordwell, David (1999). Catechism Of The Catholic Church Revised PB. London: Burns & Oates.
- Bounds, Christopher. T. (2011). "How are People Saved? The Major Views of Salvation with a Focus on Wesleyan Perspectives and their Implications". Wesley and Methodist Studies. 3: 31–54. doi:10.2307/42909800. JSTOR 42909800.
- Bradshaw, David (2019). Haynes, Daniel (ed.). A Saint for East and West: Maximus the Confessor’s Contribution to Eastern and Western Christian Theology. Eugene, OR: Wipf and Stock Publishers.
- Browne, Harold (1865). Exposition of the Thirty-nine Articles. New York: H. B. Durand.
- Chapman, Mark (2006). Anglicanism: A Very Short Introduction. Very Short Introductions. Oxford: Oxford University Press. ISBN 978-0-19-280693-2.
- Crisp, Oliver D. (2014). Deviant Calvinism: Broadening Reformed Theology. Minneapolis, MN: Fortress Press.
- Cross, F. L. (2005). The Oxford dictionary of the Christian church. New York: Oxford University Press.
- Cooper, Jordan (2015). The Great Divide: A Lutheran Evaluation of Reformed Theology. Eugene, OR: Wipf and Stock Publishers. ISBN 978-1-4982-2424-6.
- Dawes, Zach (2008). "C.S. Lewis: Calvinist or Classical Arminian?" (PDF). Society of Evangelical Arminians.
- Denzinger, Henricus (1954). Enchiridion Symbolorum et Definitionum (30th ed.). Freiburg im Breisgau: Herder.
- EncyclopaediaE (2021). "Thirty-nine Articles". Encyclopædia Britannica.
- Fahlbusch, Erwin (2008). The Encyclopedia of Christianity. Grand Rapids, MI: Wm. B. Eerdmans Publishing. ISBN 9780802824172.
- Griffith, Bruce; Radcliff, Jason (2022). Grace and Incarnation: The Oxford Movement's Shaping of the Character of Modern Anglicanism. Cambridge: Pickwick Publications.
- Harrison, Carol (2016). "Truth in a Heresy?". The Expository Times. 112 (3): 78–82. doi:10.1177/001452460011200302. S2CID 170152314.
- Hill, Samuel S. (2020). Southern Churches in Crisis Revisited. Tuscaloosa: University of Alabama Press. ISBN 978-0-8173-6008-5.
- Horton, Michael (2011). The Christian Faith: A Systematic Theology for Pilgrims on the Way. Grand Rapids, MI: Zondervan Academic.
- Jacobs, Henry Eyster, ed. (1911). The Book of Concord: Or the Symbolical Books of the Evangelical Lutheran Church. Vol. 1. Philadelphia: United Lutheran Publication House.
- James, Frank A. (1998). Peter Martyr Vermigli and Predestination: The Augustinian Inheritance of an Italian Reformer. Oxford: Clarendon.
- James, Frank A. (1998b). "Neglected Sources of the Reformation Doctrine of Predestination Ulrich Zwingli and Peter Martyr Vermigli". Modern Reformation. 7 (6): 18–22.
- John Paul II (1993). Catechism of the Catholic Church Second Edition Apostolic Constitution Fidei Depositum (PDF). Citta del Vaticano: Libreria Editrice Vaticana.
- Kettenring, Keith (2007). The Sanctification Connection: An Exploration of Human Participation in Spiritual Growth. Lanham, MD: Bloomsbury Publishing. ISBN 978-0-7618-3738-1.
- Kirkpatrick, Daniel (2018). Monergism or Synergism: Is Salvation Cooperative or the Work of God Alone?. Eugene, OR: Pickwick Publications.
- Kolb, Robert (1973). "Six Christian Sermons on the Way to Lutheran Unity" (PDF). Concordia Theological Monthly. 44 (4).
- Lambert, David (2005). "Semipelagianism". The Oxford Dictionary of the Christian Church (3 ed.). Oxford; New York: Oxford University Press. ISBN 978-0-19-280290-3.
- Levering, Matthew (2011). Predestination: Biblical and Theological Paths. New York: Oxford University Press. ISBN 978-0-19-960452-4.
- Lioy, Dan; Falconer, Robert (2019). "Lutheran and Reformed Theology in Conversation". Conspectus. 27: 192–223.
- Lowery, Kevin Twain (2008). Salvaging Wesley's Agenda: A New Paradigm for Wesleyan Virtue Ethics. Eugene, OR: Wipf and Stock Publishers.
- LWF&RCC (2019). Joint Declaration on the Doctrine of Justification (PDF). Geneva: The Lutheran World Federation.
- Marko, Jonathan S. (2020). "Grace, Early Modern Discussion of". In Jalobeanu, Dana; Wolfe, Charles T. (eds.). Encyclopedia of Early Modern Philosophy and the Sciences. Cham: Springer International Publishing. ISBN 978-3-319-20791-9.
- MacCulloch, Diarmaid (1996). Thomas Cranmer: A Life. New Haven, Connecticut: Yale University Press. ISBN 978-0-300-07448-2.
- McClintock, John; Strong, James (1880). "Arminianism". The Cyclopedia of Biblical, Theological, and Ecclesiastical Literature. New York: Harper and Brothers.
- McGrath, Alister E. (2001). Christian Theology: An Introduction. Cambridge: Blackwell Publishers.
- McGrath, Alister E. (2005). Iustitia Dei: a history of the Christian doctrine of justification. Cambridge: Cambridge University Press.
- Milton, Anthony (2002). Catholic and Reformed: The Roman and Protestant Churches in English Protestant Thought, 1600-1640. Cambridge: Cambridge University Press. ISBN 978-0-521-89329-9.
- Moreland, J. P. (2001). "Miracles, Agency, and Theistic Science: A Reply to Steven B. Cowan". Philosophia Christi. 4 (1).
- Oakley, Francis (1988). The Medieval Experience: Foundations of Western Cultural Singularity. Toronto: University of Toronto Press.
- Olson, Roger E. (1999). The Story of Christian Theology: Twenty Centuries of Tradition & Reform. Downers Grove, IL: InterVarsity Press. ISBN 9780830815050.
- Olson, Roger E. (2002). The Mosaic of Christian Beliefs: Twenty Centuries of Unity & Diversity. Downers Grove, IL: InterVarsity Press.
- Olson, Roger E. (2009). Arminian Theology: Myths and Realities. Downers Grove, IL: InterVarsity Press.
- Olson, Roger E. (2015). "Review of Oliver Crisp's "Deviant Calvinism" Part Three". My evangelical, Arminian theological musings.
- Overbeck, J. J., ed. (1899). The acts and decrees of the Synod of Jerusalem, sometimes called the Council of Bethlehem, holden under Dositheus, Patriarch of Jerusalem in 1672. Translated by Robertson, James Nathaniel William Beauchamp. London: T. Baker.
- Payton Jr., James R. (2010). Light from the Christian East: An Introduction to the Orthodox Tradition. Downers Grove: InterVarsity Press.
- Peterson, Robert A.; Williams, Michael D. (2004). Why I am not an Arminian. Downers Grove, IL: Intervarsity Press. ISBN 0-8308-3248-3.
- Pickar, C. H. (1981) [1967]. The New Catholic Encyclopedia. Vol. 5. Washington D.C.
- Pinson, J. Matthew (2022). 40 Questions about Arminianism. Grand Rapids, MI: Kregel Publications.
- Pohle, Joseph (1912). "Semipelagianism" . In Herbermann, Charles (ed.). Catholic Encyclopedia. Vol. 13. New York: Robert Appleton Company.
- Puchniak, Robert (2008). "Pelagius: Kierkegaard's use of Pelagius and Pelagianism". In Stewart, Jon Bartley (ed.). Kierkegaard and the Patristic and Medieval Traditions. Farnham: Ashgate Publishing. ISBN 978-0-7546-6391-1.
- Pugh, Philip (1860). Arminianism V. Hyper-Calvinism: Being Three Letters. Tunstall: Arthur Tomkinson.
- Reymond, Robert L. (2010). A New Systematic Theology of the Christian Faith (2 ed.). Nashville, TN: Thomas Nelson.
- Robinson, Geoffrey D. (2022). Saved by Grace through Faith or Saved by Decree?. Eugene, OR: Wipf and Stock Publishers.
- Rogers, Katherin (2004). "Augustine's Compatibilism". Religious Studies. 40 (4): 415–435. doi:10.1017/S003441250400722X.
- Salter, Roger (2018). "THE MARTYRS' STAKE: The Ensign of Reformational Anglicanism". VirtueOnline.
- Sammons, Peter (2020). Reprobation: from Augustine to the Synod of Dort: The Historical Development of the Reformed Doctrine of Reprobation. Gottingen: Vandenhoeck & Ruprecht.
- Schaff, Philip (1997). History of the Christian Church. Vol. 3. Oak Harbor, WA: Logos Research Systems.
- Stamoolis, James J. (2010). Three Views on Eastern Orthodoxy and Evangelicalism. Grand Rapids, MI: Zondervan. ISBN 9780310864363.
- Stanglin, Keith D.; McCall, Thomas H. (2012). Jacob Arminius: Theologian of Grace. New York: OUP USA.
- Straton, Timothy A. (2020). Human Freedom, Divine Knowledge, and Mere Molinism: A Biblical, Historical, Theological, and Philosophical Analysis. Eugene, OR: Wipf and Stock Publishers.
- Teselle, Eugene (2014). "The Background: Augustine and the Pelagian Controversy". In Hwang, Alexander Y.; Matz, Brian J.; Casiday, Augustine (eds.). Grace for Grace: The Debates after Augustine and Pelagius. Washington, D.C.: Catholic University of America Press. pp. 1–13. ISBN 978-0-8132-2601-9.
- Thorsen, Don (2007). An Exploration of Christian Theology. Grand Rapids: Baker Books.
- Tomline, George (1818). Elements of Christian theology. Vol. 2. London: Luke Hansard & sons.
- Ware, Timothy (1993). The Orthodox Church. London: Penguin UK. ISBN 978-0-14192500-4.
- Wiley, H. Orton (1941). Christian theology. Vol. 2. Kansas City, MO: Beacon Hill Press.
- Wilson, Kenneth (2018). Augustine's Conversion from Traditional Free Choice to "Non-free Free Will: A Comprehensive Methodology. Tübingen: Mohr Siebeck.
- Woolford, Tom (10 March 2017). "Article 10 — Of Free-Will". Church Society.
