= Unregenerate =

Unregenerate may refer to

- Unregenerate!, Doctor Who audio play
- In Christian theology,
  - A person who has not undergone regeneration
  - A synonym for infidel
