= Repentance =

Reviewing one's actions and feeling contrition or regret

Repentance is reviewing one's actions and feeling contrition or regret for past or present wrongdoings, which is accompanied by commitment to and actual actions that show and prove a change for the better.

In modern times, it is generally seen as involving a commitment to personal change and the resolve to live a more responsible and humane life. In other words, being sorry for one's misdeeds. It can also involve sorrow over a specific sin or series of sins that an individual feels guilt over, or conviction that they have committed. The practice of repentance plays an important role in the soteriological doctrines of Judaism, Christianity, and Islam.

Analogous practices have been found in other world religions as well. In religious contexts, it often involves an act of confession to God or to a spiritual elder (such as a monk or priest). This confession might include an admission of guilt, a promise or intent not to repeat the offense, an attempt to make restitution for the wrong, or in some way reverse the harmful effects of the wrong where possible.

== Judaism ==
Repentance (Hebrew: תשובה, literally, "return", pronounced tshuva or teshuva) is one element of atoning for sin in Judaism. Judaism recognizes that everybody sins on occasion, but that people can stop or minimize those occasions in the future by repenting for past transgressions. Thus, the primary purpose of repentance in Judaism is ethical self transformation.

A Jewish penitent is traditionally known as a baal teshuva (lit., "master of repentance" or "master of return") (Hebrew: בעל תשובה; for a woman: בעלת תשובה, baalat teshuva; plural: בעלי תשובה, baalei teshuva). An alternative modern term is hozer beteshuva (חוזר בתשובה) (lit., "returning in repentance"). "In a place where baalei teshuva stand", according to halakha, "even the full-fledged righteous do not stand."

== Christianity ==
Repentance is a stage in Christian salvation where the believer turns away from sin. In Catholic, Orthodox, and Lutheran theology, repentance is part of the larger theological concept behind the sacrament of confession and absolution. As a distinct stage in the ordo salutis, the Reformed theological tradition argues that it occurs after faith.

Christian denominations that adhere to the liturgical kalendar, such as Catholicism, Lutheranism, Moravianism and Anglicanism, focus on repentance especially during the season of Lent, while emphasizing its importance in the life of the believer throughout the year.

== Islam ==
Tawba is the Islamic concept of repenting to God due to performing any sins and misdeeds. It is a direct matter between a person and God, so there is no intercession without Allah's permission. There is no original sin in Islam. It is the act of leaving what God has prohibited and returning to what he has commanded. The word denotes the act of being repentant for one's misdeeds, atoning for those misdeeds, and having a strong determination to forsake those misdeeds (remorse, resolution, and repentance). If someone sins against another person, restitution is required.

== Hinduism ==
Dharma Shastras and Vedas advocate for self-reflection, repentance paschatapa and atonement prayaschitta. Stories such as that of Ajamila speak about forgiveness by grace of God even to the worst sinners.

== Buddhism ==
The Buddha considered shame over doing wrong (Pali: hiri) and fear of the consequences of wrongdoing (Pali:otappa) as essential safeguards against falling into evil ways and further as extremely useful in the path of purification. Also recommended was the regular practice of self-assessment or wise reflection (Pali: yoniso manasikara) on one's own actions in relation to others and the bigger picture.

In Mahayana Buddhism, one of the most common repentance verses used for reflection is Samantabhadra's Repentance Verse taken from Chapter 40 of the Flower Adornment Sutra:

For all the evil deeds I have done in the past
Created by my body, mouth, and mind,
From beginningless greed, anger, and delusion,
I now know shame and repent of them all.

== Hawaiian religion ==
Hoʻoponopono (ho-o-pono-pono) is an ancient practice in Hawaiian religion of reconciliation and forgiveness, combined with (repentance) prayers. Similar forgiveness practices were performed on islands throughout the South Pacific, including Samoa, Tahiti and New Zealand. Traditionally hoʻoponopono is practiced by healing priests or kahuna lapaʻau among family members of a person who is physically ill. Modern versions are performed within the family by a family elder, or by the individual alone.

== See also ==
- Buß- und Bettag, Day of Repentance and Prayer
- Mea culpa
- Repentance Day, a public holiday of Christian prayer in Papua New Guinea
