= Glorification in Reformed Christianity =

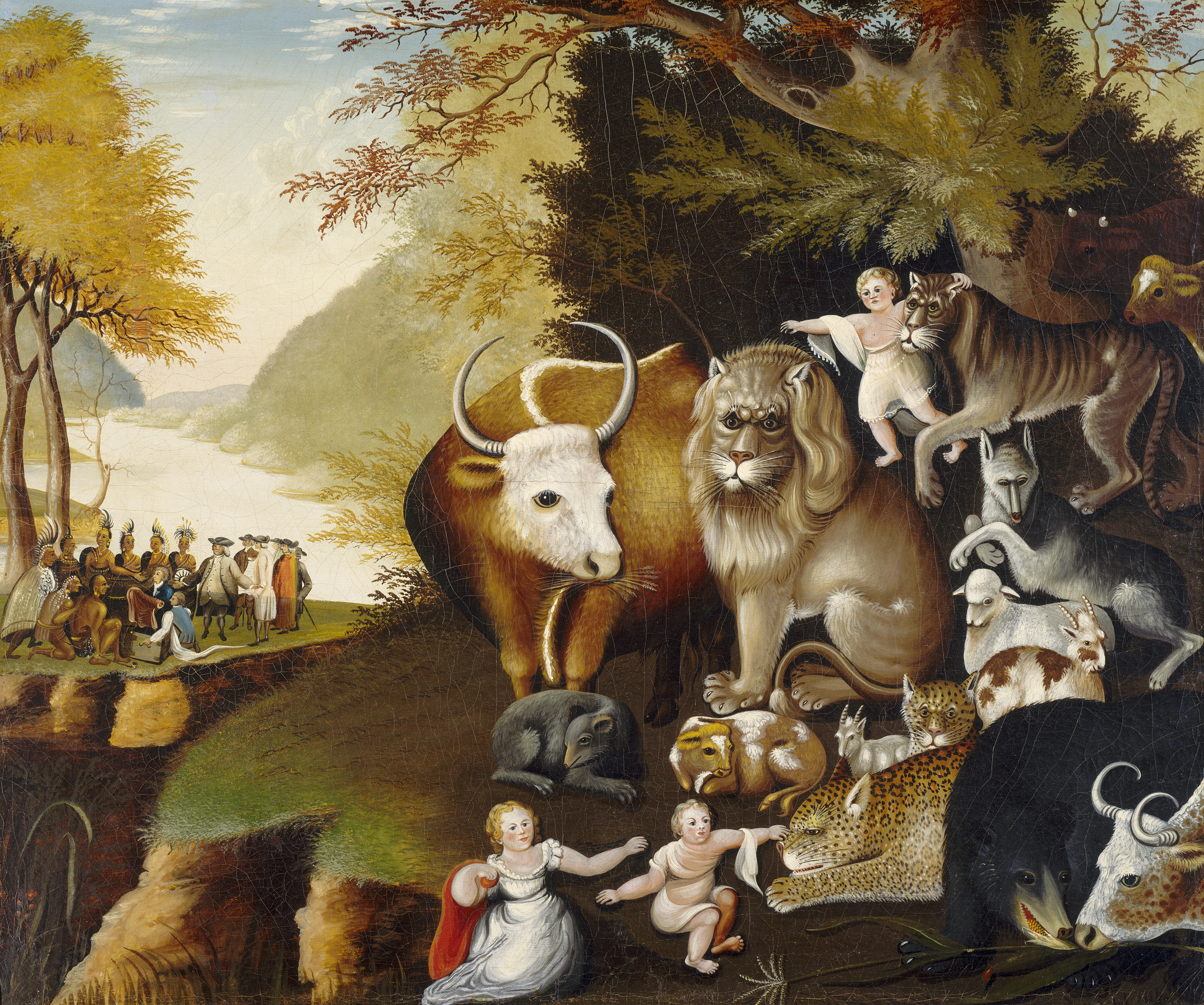
Peaceable Kingdom. Oil painting by Edward Hicks, alluding to imagery from Isaiah 11:6 "The wolf also shall dwell with the lamb, and the leopard shall lie down with the kid; and the calf and the young lion and the fatling together; and a little child shall lead them.".

Glorification is a concept in Christian theology treated differently by different Christian denominations. In Reformed Christianity, glorification is the final stage of the ordo salutis and an aspect of Christian soteriology and Christian eschatology. It refers to the nature of believers after death and judgement, "the final step in the application of redemption. Biblical verses commonly cited as evidence for this doctrine include Psalm 49:15, Daniel 12:2, John 11:23–24, Romans 8:30 and 1 Corinthians 15:20. The theological doctrine of glorification goes on to describe how believers will be resurrected after death and given new bodies that have a degree of continuity with their mortal selves.
