= Regeneration (theology) =

Objective work of God in a Christian's life

Regeneration, while sometimes perceived to be a step in the ordo salutis ('order of salvation'), is generally understood in Christian theology to be the objective work of God in a believer's life. Spiritually, it means that God brings a person to new life (that they are "born again") from a previous state of separation from God and subjection to the decay of death (Ephesians 2:5). Thus, in Lutheran and Catholic theology, it generally means that which takes place during baptism. In Calvinism (Reformed theology) and Arminian theology, baptism is recognized as an outward sign of an inward reality which is to follow regeneration as a sign of obedience to the New Testament; as such, the Methodist churches teach that regeneration occurs during the new birth.

While the exact Greek noun for 'rebirth' or 'regeneration' (Ancient Greek: παλιγγενεσία, romanized: palingenesia) appears just twice in the New Testament (Matthew 19:28 and Titus 3:5), regeneration in Christianity is held to represent a wider theme of re-creation and spiritual rebirth, including the concept of "being born again" (John 3:3–8 and 1 Peter 1:3; regeneration is also called the "second birth"). In some schools of Christian thought, it is held that when a person expresses belief in Jesus Christ for their salvation, they are then born of God, "begotten of him" (1 John 5:1). As a result of becoming part of God's family, the person becomes a different and new creature (2 Corinthians 5:17).

== New Testament references ==
Matthew 19:28 is translated in many English translations of the Bible (such as in the Geneva Bible, King James Version, and American Standard Version) as Jesus referring to "the regeneration". The New International Version refers to "the renewal of all things" and the English Standard Version refers to "the new world".

In Titus 3:5, the writer of the epistle refers to two aspects of the mercy which God has shown believers, "the washing of regeneration (i.e. baptism) and renewing of the Holy Spirit."

== Historical interpretations ==
Anglican Bishop Charles Ellicott notes the "wide range" of meaning: in Titus 3:5, "the word ... is applied to baptism, as the instrument of the regeneration or new birth of the individual believer", but "there is to be a 'new birth' for mankind as well as for the individual". However, much of the historical theological interpretation of "regeneration" has focused on individual renewal, as shown in the following theological schools of thought:

=== Baptismal regeneration in Lutheranism and Roman Catholicism ===
Lutheran and Roman Catholic theology holds that "baptism confers cleansing of [original] sin, the infusion of regenerating grace and union with Christ." Official Roman Catholic teaching specifically states that regeneration commences with baptism.

=== General evangelicalism ===
During the period of the Great Awakening, emphasis in Protestant theology began to be placed on regeneration as the starting point of an individual's new life in Christ.

=== Pelagianism ===
Pelagius believed that people were born pure, with God's spirit already at work, making the need for spiritual regeneration from a previous sinful state irrelevant. Since Pelagius, modernist theology has seen regeneration as more a matter of education than spiritual renewal.

=== Calvinism and Reformed theology ===
Reformed theology teaches that regeneration precedes faith through the doctrine of Total depravity. Before regeneration a sinner is dead and until the sinner is regenerated and given a new nature, the sinner cannot believe.

Reformed theology characteristically views baptism as an outward sign of God's internal work, as John Calvin stated: “all who are clothed with the righteousness of Christ are at the same time regenerated by the Spirit, and that we have an earnest of this regeneration in baptism.” Regeneration is further described as the "secret operation of the Holy Spirit."

=== Arminianism ===
Arminian theology teaches that the first steps are taken by God in the form of prevenient grace. Arminians differ from Calvinists in affirming that God's grace is resistible. "When our wills are freed, we can either accept God’s saving grace in faith or reject it to our own ruin." When someone believes, it is not grace which makes one to differ from another person, but the freed response to exercise faith to accept that grace. According to Classical Arminians if a person is regenerated it is due to that person's response to grace with faith alone; if a person is rejected, it is due to that person's choice alone. Prevenient grace is appropriated or rejected before regeneration; those who do not reject it come into the light by grace in concert with their freed will operating synergistically. After a believer has under the influence of prevenient grace made the faithful decision to follow Christ, God regenerates them spiritually. In contrast to Calvinism, which teaches that regeneration is the decree of God, Arminianism teaches that a sinner must repent and place their faith in Christ as the condition to regeneration and, in this manner, regeneration is by faith, not by decree.

Wesleyan–Arminian theology teaches that the New Birth contains two phases that occur together, justification and regeneration:

Though these two phases of the new birth occur simultaneously, they are, in fact, two separate and distinct acts. Justification is that gracious and judicial act of God whereby a soul is granted complete absolution from all guilt and a full release from the penalty of sin (Romans 3:23-25). This act of divine grace is wrought by faith in the merits of our Lord and Saviour Jesus Christ (Romans 5:1). Regeneration is the impartation of divine life which is manifested in that radical change in the moral character of man, from the love and life of sin to the love of God and the life of righteousness (2 Corinthians 5:17; 1 Peter 1:23). ―Principles of Faith, Emmanuel Association of Churches

— Guidebook of the Emmanuel Association Churches, pages 7–8

=== Quakerism ===
The Central Yearly Meeting of Friends, a Holiness Quaker denomination, teaches that regeneration is the "divine work of initial salvation (Tit. 3:5), or conversion, which involves the accompanying works of justification (Rom. 5:18) and adoption (Rom. 8:15, 16)." In regeneration, which occurs in the New Birth, there is a "transformation in the heart of the believer wherein he finds himself a new creation in Christ (II Cor. 5:17; Col. 1:27)."

== See also ==
- Altar call
- Augustine of Hippo
- Born again
- Conversion to Christianity
- Decision theology
- Evangelicalism
- Evangelism
- Free will in theology
- Holy Spirit
- Justus Velsius
- Monergism and synergism
- Sinner's prayer

== General and cited references ==
- Burkhardt, H (1988), "Regeneration", in Wright, David; Ferguson, Sinclair; Packer, J I (eds.), New Dictionary of Theology, Downers Grove: InterVarsity Press, p. 574, ISBN 0830814000
- Demarest, Bruce (1997), The Cross and Salvation, Wheaton: Crossway Books, ISBN 0891079378
- Grudem, Wayne (1994), Systematic Theology (Reprint ed.), Grand Rapids: Zondervan Publishing House, ISBN 0310286700
- Olson, Roger (2006), Arminian Theology, Downers Grove: IVP Academic, ISBN 0830828419
