= Limited depravity =

Doctrine denying original sin

Limited depravity is the doctrine that denies original sin has entirely tainted human free will. Instead, the doctrine asserts that all humans, while unable not to sin, have the inherent ability to accept Jesus Christ's offer of salvation. This belief is held by Pelagianism, Semi-Pelagianism, and some who call themselves Arminians.

This doctrine is in opposition to total depravity. This teaches that humans are totally corrupted by sin, and have no ability to accept Jesus’s offer of salvation - as such, they can only do so through God’s gift of grace. Limited depravity is rejected by Calvinists and most Arminians including Jacobus Arminius himself, his followers, the Remonstrants, John Wesley and most Methodists.
