= Total depravity =

Protestant theological doctrine

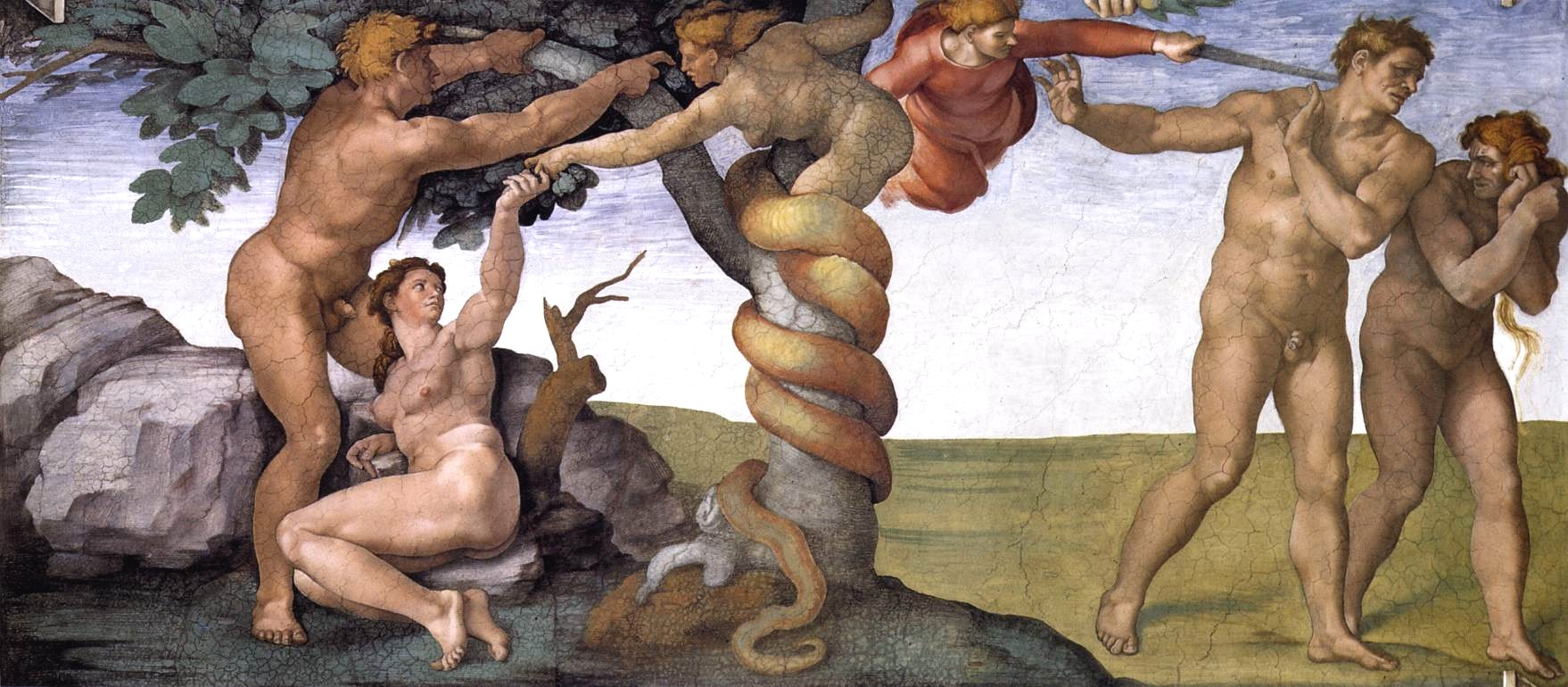
A Sistine Chapel fresco depicts the expulsion of Adam and Eve from the garden of Eden for their sin of eating from the fruit of the Tree of the knowledge of good and evil.

Total depravity (also called radical corruption or pervasive depravity) is a Protestant theological doctrine derived from the concept of original sin. It teaches that, as a consequence of the Fall, every person born into the world is enslaved to the service of sin as a result of their fallen nature and, apart from the efficacious (irresistible) or prevenient (enabling) grace of God, is completely unable to choose by themselves to follow God, refrain from evil, or accept the gift of salvation as it is offered.

The doctrine is advocated to various degrees by many Protestant denominations, including Lutheranism and all Calvinist churches. Arminian denominations, such as Methodists, believe and teach total depravity, but with distinct differences, the most important of which is the distinction between irresistible grace and prevenient grace.

== History ==
Augustine of Hippo argued that, since the Fall, all humanity is in a self-imposed bondage to sin. All people are inescapably predisposed to evil prior to making any actual choice, and are unable to refrain from sin. Free will is not taken away in the sense of the ability to choose between alternatives, but people are unable to make these choices in service to God rather than self. Thomas Aquinas also taught that people are not able to avoid sin after the Fall, and that this entailed a loss of original righteousness or sinlessness, as well as concupiscence or selfish desire. Duns Scotus, however, modified this interpretation, and only believed that sin entailed a lack of original righteousness. During the Protestant Reformation, the Reformers took Scotus's position to be the Catholic position and argued that it made sin only a defect or privation of righteousness rather than an inclination toward evil. Martin Luther, John Calvin and other Reformers used the term "total depravity" to articulate what they claimed to be the Augustinian view that sin corrupts the entire human nature. This did not, however, mean the loss of the imago Dei (image of God). The only theologian who argued that the imago Dei itself was taken away and that the very substance of fallen humanity was sin was Matthias Flacius Illyricus, and this view was repudiated in the Formula of Concord.

John Calvin used terms like "total depravity" to mean that, despite the ability of people to outwardly uphold the law, there remained an inward distortion which makes all human actions displeasing to God, whether or not they are outwardly good or bad. Even after regeneration, every human action is mixed with evil. Later Calvinist theologians were agreed on this, but the language of the Canons of Dort as well as the 17th century Reformed theologians which followed it did not repeat the language of "total depravity", and arguably offer a more moderate view on the state of fallen humanity than Calvin.

=== In Arminianism ===
Arminianism also accepts a doctrine of total depravity, although not identical to the Calvinist position. Total depravity was affirmed by the Five articles of Remonstrance, by Jacobus Arminius himself, and by John Wesley, who strongly identified with Arminius through publication of his periodical The Arminian and also advocated a strong doctrine of inability. The Methodist Quarterly Review states that:

It is not sufficiently known, we opine, that Methodists—the genuine Arminians of the present—do not entirely agree with this view of depravity. To what has been said, as being the Calvinist view of the total depravity of our nature, we do heartily assent, with the following exceptions:—First. We do not think that all men continue totally depraved until their regeneration. Secondly. We think man, under the atonement, is not, properly speaking, in a state of nature. He is not left to the unalleviated evils of total depravity. The atonement has not only secured grace for him, but a measure in him, by virtue of which he not only has moral light, but is often incited to good desires, and well-intended efforts to do what is perceived to be the divine will.

Some Reformed theologians have mistakenly used the term "Arminianism" to include some who hold the Semipelagian doctrine of limited depravity, which allows for an "island of righteousness" in human hearts that is uncorrupted by sin and able to accept God's offer of salvation without a special dispensation of grace. Although Arminius and Wesley both vehemently rejected this view, it has sometimes inaccurately been lumped together with theirs (particularly by Calvinists) because of other similarities between their respective systems such as conditional election, unlimited atonement, and prevenient grace. In particular, prevenient grace is viewed by some as giving humans back the freedom to follow God in one way or another.

== Theology ==
Reformed and Lutheran theologians have never considered humans to be absent of goodness or unable to do good outwardly as a result of the fall. People retain the imago Dei, though it has been distorted.

Total depravity is the fallen state of human beings as a result of original sin. The doctrine of total depravity asserts that people are, as a result of the fall, not inclined or even able to love God wholly with heart, mind, and strength, but rather are inclined by nature to serve their own will and desires and reject his rule. Even religion and philanthropy are wicked to God because they originate from a selfish human desire and are not done to the glory of God. Therefore, in Reformed theology, if God is to save anyone, he must predestine, elect, regenerate and call individuals to salvation since fallen humanity does not want to, and is indeed incapable of, choosing him. However, in Arminian theology prevenient grace (or "enabling grace") does reach through total depravity to enable people to respond to the salvation offered by God in Jesus Christ.

Total depravity does not mean that people have lost part of their humanity or are ontologically deteriorated. Just as Adam and Eve were created with the ability not to sin, people retain that essential ability either to sin or not to sin, even though some properties of their humanity are corrupted. It also does not mean that people are as evil as possible. Rather, it means that even the good which a person may intend is faulty in its premise, false in its motive, and weak in its implementation; and there is no mere refinement of natural capacities that can correct this condition. Thus, even acts of generosity and altruism are in fact egoist acts in disguise. All good, consequently, is derived from God alone, and in no way through humanity.

== Roman Catholic and Orthodox perspectives ==
The Roman Catholic Church maintains that a person cannot, "be justified before God by his own works, ... without the grace of God through Jesus Christ", thereby rejecting Pelagianism in accordance with the writings of Augustine and the Second Council of Orange (529). However, even strictly Augustinian Catholics disagree with the Protestant doctrine of total depravity. Referring to Scripture and the Church Fathers, Catholicism views human free will as deriving from God's image because humans are created in God's image. Accordingly, the Council of Trent, at its sixth session (January 1547), condemned as heresy any doctrine asserting "since Adam's sin, the free will of man is lost and extinguished". Regardless, a concept of radical depravity is stressed in some Catholic theological currents like Jansenism and Molinism.

The Eastern Orthodox Church embraces the "semi-Augustinian" position of John Cassian and also defends Augustine of Hippo relating to this doctrine. Seraphim Rose, for example, contends that Augustine never denied the free will of every human, thus he never taught total depravity. Chrysostomos II of Cyprus has asserted that Augustine's teaching might have been used and distorted in Western Christianity to produce innovative theologizing, and that it is not Augustine's fault.

== See also ==
- Christian views on the old covenant
- Free will in theology
- On the Freedom of the Will, a book treating the extent of man's corruption by Jonathan Edwards
- Incurvatus in se
- On the Bondage of the Will by Martin Luther
- Peccatism
- Radical evil
- Theory of Evil Human Nature
