= Prevenient grace =

Christian theological concept

Prevenient grace (or preceding grace or enabling grace) is a Christian theological concept that refers to the grace of God in a person's life which precedes and prepares to conversion. The concept was first developed by Augustine of Hippo (354–430), was affirmed by the Second Council of Orange (529) and has become part of Catholic theology. A similar concept is also found in Eastern Orthodox and Arminian theology. In all these traditions, prevenient grace is understood as universally available, enabling all individuals to have faith while leaving acceptance dependent on libertarian free will. In Reformed theology, it appears in the form of effectual calling, through which God's grace irresistibly leads certain individuals to salvation.

== Definition ==
The concept of "prevenient grace" was originated and developed by Augustine of Hippo (354–430), based on St. Ambrose's (c. 339 – 397) writings. Prevenient grace refers to the grace of God in a person's life that precedes conversion. The original expression (Latin: gratia praeveniens) means literally "grace that precedes". The English translation, "prevenient", likewise means preceding, antecedent, coming before. This concept has a similar meaning to the concepts of "vocation" or "calling".

There are variations in how prevenient grace is understood, particularly regarding God’s intent. In Roman Catholic, Eastern Orthodox, and Arminian theology, prevenient grace is seen as a predisposing or enabling grace that assists all individuals in coming to faith. In Reformed theology, it is simultaneously comparable to two concepts: common grace which does not improve man's depraved unregenerate nature and has no salvific purpose, and effectual calling through which God calls to irresistibly believe.

When grace is considered with regard to its effects, prevenient grace is differentiated from subsequent grace. The nature of subsequent grace differs depending on the view on the deterministic or non-deterministic nature of the providence of God. John Wesley named two forms of subsequent grace: "justifying grace" (also called saving grace) and "sanctifying grace". Both of those subsequent forms of grace are resistible. On the contrary Calvinists have considered the justifying grace as an irresistible grace.

== History ==
=== Origins ===
The notion of "prevenient grace" (Latin: Gratia praeveniens) was developed by Augustine of Hippo (354–430). In response to Pelagianism, he argued that prevenient grace is necessary to prepare the human will for conversion. When Pelagius appealed to St. Ambrose (c. 339 – 397) to support his view, Augustine replied with a series of quotations from Ambrose which indicated the need for prevenient grace. Augustine described free will without the spiritual aid of grace as, "captive free will" (Latin: liberum arbitrium captivatum).

Through the influence of grace, however, this will becomes a spiritually "freed will" or literally a "liberated free will" (Latin: liberum arbitrium liberatum). Prevenient grace first imparts essential spiritual enlightenment, after which the power to believe is granted exclusively to the elect. Augustine viewed the grace leading to justification as unfailing for the elect.

=== Developments ===
In 529, at the Second Council of Orange, the question at hand was whether the doctrines of Augustine on God's providence were to be affirmed, or if Semi-Pelagianism could be affirmed. Semi-Pelagianism was a moderate form of Pelagianism which teaches that the first step of salvation is by human will and not the grace of God.

The determination of the Council could be considered "semi-Augustinian". It defined that faith, though a free act of man, resulted, even in its beginnings, from the grace of God, enlightening the human mind and enabling belief. This describes the operation of prevenient grace allowing the unregenerate to repent in faith. On the other hand, the Council of Orange condemned the belief in predestination to damnation implied by the Augustinian soteriology.

The canons of the Council directly quoted Augustine's work related on the concept of prevenient grace (Canons 1, 2, 5, 6, 7). Boniface II (died in 532) writing to Caesarius of Arles, confirmed the notion of prevenient grace: "[W]e confirm by the authority of the Apostolic See your confession, in which in the Opposite way you explain that right faith in Christ and the beginning of all good will, according to Catholic truth, is inspired in the minds of individuals by the preceding grace of God."

== In Roman Catholic theology ==
The Second Council of Orange of 529 stated that faith, though a free act, resulted even in its beginnings from the grace of God, enlightening the human mind and enabling belief.

In canon 18 it is said "That grace is preceded by no merits. A reward is due to good works, if they are performed; but grace, which is not due, precedes, that they may be done [St. Prosper]." In canon 23 it is said that God prepares our wills that they may desire the good. Canon 25 states, "In every good work, it is not we who begin... but He (God) first inspires us with faith and love of Him, through no preceding merit on our part."

Prevenient grace was discussed in the fifth chapter of the sixth session of the Council of Trent (1545–1563) which used the phrase: "a Dei per dominum Christum Iesum praeveniente gratia" rendered "a predisposing grace of God through Jesus Christ". Those who turned from God by sins are disposed by God's grace to turn back and become justified by freely assenting to that grace.

The Catechism of the Catholic Church (1992) explains, "No one can say 'Jesus is Lord' except by the Holy Spirit. Every time we begin to pray to Jesus it is the Holy Spirit who draws us on the way of prayer by his prevenient grace."

== In Eastern Orthodox theology ==
In responding to Calvinism at the Synod of Jerusalem (1672), the Confession of Dositheus, describes the operation of the prevenient grace in the process of salvation. This grace is initially "imparted to all", "illuminating" individuals. Subsequently, based on a person’s free-will response, it becomes "cooperating" and "enabling".

In Orthodoxy, the operation of prevenient grace involves a synergism between God and humanity, closely resembling the Wesleyan concept of prevenient grace. Once regenerated, an individual can perform spiritual good but remains reliant on divine grace to guide and precede their actions.

== In Arminian theology ==
=== Classical Arminianism ===
Prevenient grace is an important concept in Arminian theology. Jacobus Arminius affirmed total depravity but believed that prevenient grace enables people to respond to God's offer of salvation: "Concerning grace and free will, this is what I teach according to the Scriptures and orthodox consent: Free will is unable to begin or to perfect any true and spiritual good, without grace. [...] This grace [prævenit] goes before, accompanies, and follows; it excites, assists, operates that we will, and co operates lest we will in vain."

Theologian Robert E. Picirilli writes, quoting Arminius, that: "What Arminius meant by 'prevenient grace' was that grace that precedes actual regeneration and which, except when finally resisted, inevitably leads to regeneration. He was quick to observe that this 'assistance of the Holy Spirit' is of such sufficiency 'as to keep at the greatest possible distance from Pelagianism.'" Arminius distinguished between "prevenient" or "preceding" grace that involves a monergistic work of God, and a "subsequent" or "following" grace that involves a synergistic work.

=== Wesleyan Arminianism ===
John Wesley in his sermon #85, "On Working Out Our Own Salvation", stated that "prevenient grace elicits the first wish to please God, the first dawn of light concerning His will, and the first slight transient conviction of having sinned against Him." Wesley insisted on prevenient grace as a solution to two great problems in Christianity: the belief of original sin and the Protestant doctrine of salvation by grace alone.

Thomas Oden defines prevenient grace as "the grace that begins to enable one to choose further to cooperate with saving grace. By offering the will the restored capacity to respond to grace, the person then may freely and increasingly become an active, willing participant in receiving the conditions for justification."

Wesleyans generally distinguish two forms of call related to prevenient grace:

1. A universal call which is the secret influence of the Holy Spirit upon the conscience.
2. A direct call through the revealed word as found in the Holy Scriptures.

John Wesley adapted the Thirty-Nine Articles of Religion adopted by the Church of England in 1563 into the Articles of Religion, for use by American Methodists. With very similar language with Article X of the first, the Article VIII of the second states, "The condition of man after the fall of Adam is such that he cannot turn and prepare himself, by his own natural strength and works, to faith, and calling upon God; wherefore we have no power to do good works, pleasant and acceptable to God, without the grace of God by Christ preventing [preceding] us, that we may have a good will, and working with us, when we have that good will" (emphasis added).

The Article VIII is official doctrine for many Wesleyan or Holiness movement denominations such as the United Methodist Church, the Church of the Nazarene, or the Pillar of Fire Church.

Infant baptism is seen in Methodism as a celebration of prevenient grace. Although infant baptism is important for the life journey of the faithful disciple, it is not essential.

Most Methodist hymnals have a section with hymns concerning prevenient grace as The United Methodist Hymnal (1989). One of the best known hymns written about this doctrine is Charles Wesley's "Come, Sinners, to the Gospel Feast", which includes the lines, "Ye need not one be left behind, for God hath bid all humankind ... the invitation is to all" (emphasis added).

=== Objections ===
Some refer to the Arminian concept of prevenient grace as "universal enablement". They characterize the Arminian view as teaching that God has restored to every individual the ability to seek after God and choose salvation.

Nevertheless, Arminians consider that prevenient grace is rather individually directed than universally directed. They consider it is the enabling influence of the Holy Spirit on a human person in a "relational dynamic—a back-and-forth, influence-and-response, relational movement. Like other interpersonal forms of communication and influence, it is something that can come and go".

Calvinists argue that because this grace is supposedly given to all alike, the determining factor in salvation becomes the will of man. They see this libertarian will and choice of the individual as a good work required for salvation and thus an implicit rejection of salvation by grace alone.

Arminians object that, according to their view, salvation is by grace alone. This is because the provision of salvation including its initiation, activation and obtaining is by grace alone. It is respectively the result of prevenient grace, justifying grace and regenerating grace.

Besides, they remark that Calvinism teaches the compatibility of divine determinism and moral responsibility. Man is responsible for his choice when he acts voluntarily, even if his will is determined by God. Thus, as man comes to faith voluntarily, it follows that man is morally responsible for his faith. Consequently, the choice of salvation through faith is a good action. So, for Calvinists to remain consistent, they can not claim that the praiseworthiness of the choice of salvation (whether libertarian or semicompatibilist) is a rejection of salvation by grace alone. Furthermore, Arminians reject the idea that the libertarian choice to accept the provision of salvation is participation in the work of salvation.

== In Lutheran theology ==
In Lutheranism, the term “prevenient grace” is used primarily as an inherited Augustinian expression referring to the Holy Spirit’s prior action in salvation through the Bible. It may be then employed to underline the universality attributed to the lutheran converting grace.

== In Reformed theology ==
Calvinists have their own doctrine of prevenient grace, which they identify with the effectual calling and which is immediately and necessarily followed by faith. Because of the necessity of salvation following this dispensation of prevenient grace, the justifying grace is called irresistible grace.

The Calvinist form of prevenient grace is also related to common grace by which God shows general mercy to everyone, restrains sin, and gives humankind a knowledge of God and of their sinfulness and need of rescue from sin. Despite this grace has no salvific purpose, it is said to let people without excuse of not coming to God. Common grace explains also why people seem to come to God, but eventually seem to commit definitive apostasy. About that issue, Calvin formulated the concept of a temporary grace (sometimes called "evanescent grace") that appears and works for only a while in the reprobate but then disappears. According to this concept, the Holy Spirit can create in some people effects which are indistinguishable from those of the irresistible grace of God, producing also visible "fruit". Temporary grace was also supported by later Calvinist theologians such as Theodore Beza, William Perkins, John Owen, A. W. Pink and Lorraine Boettner.

=== Objections ===
Since Calvinistic common grace leaves people absolutely incapable of coming to God, non-Calvinists do not believe it leaves them without excuse. Concerning the operation of temporary grace supposed to explain apparent apostasy, non-Calvinists find it contrary to the revealed character of God, and leaving Christian believers without real assurance of salvation during their life.

== Notes and references ==
=== Sources ===
- Aquinas, Thomas (1954). Nature and Grace: Selections from the Summa Theologica of Thomas Aquinas. Philadelphia: The Westminster Press.
- Arminius, Jacobus (1853). The Works of James Arminius. Vol. 2. Translated by Nichols, James; Bagnall, W. R. Auburn, N.Y.: Derby and Miller.
- Bettenson, Henry (1970). The Later Christian Fathers. London: Oxford University Press.
- Bignon, Guillaume (2018). Excusing Sinners and Blaming God: A Calvinist Assessment of Determinism, Moral Responsibility, and Divine Involvement in Evil. London: Wipf and Stock Publishers.
- Bird, Benedict (2021). "The Development Of Augustine's Views On Free Will And Grace, And The Conflicting Claims To Consistency Therewith By John Owen And John Goodwin". Westminster Theological Journal. 83 (1): 73–101.
- Boettner, Lorraine (1932). The Reformed Doctrine of Predestination. Philadelphia: The Presbyterian and Reformed Publishing Company.
- Bounds, Christopher. T. (2011). "How are People Saved? The Major Views of Salvation with a Focus on Wesleyan Perspectives and their Implications". Wesley and Methodist Studies. 3: 31–54. doi:10.2307/42909800. JSTOR 42909800.
- Calvin, John (1845). Institutes of the Christian Religion; a New Translation by Henry Beveridge. Vol. 3. Translated by Henry Beveridge. Edinburgh: Calvin Translation Society.
- Calvin, John (1961). Concerning the Eternal Predestination of God. London: James Clarke & Co. Limited.
- Calvin, John (1963). The Epistle of Paul the Apostle to the Hebrews and the First and Second epistles of St Peter. Translated by W. B. Johnston. Grand Rapids, MI: William B. Eerdmans Publishing Company.
- Coords, Richard (2021-04-12). "Choice Principles". Society of Evangelical Arminians.
- Cox, Leo G. (1969). "Prevenient Grace - A Wesleyan View" (PDF). Journal of the Evangelical Theological Society: 143–149.
- Cross, F. L. (2005). The Oxford dictionary of the Christian church. New York: Oxford University Press.
- Cunningham, William (2022). "Efficacious Grace Vs Arminian Prevenient Grace". Monergism.
- Davis, John Jefferson (1991). "The Perseverance of the Saints: A History of the Doctrine" (PDF). Journal of the Evangelical Theological Society. 34 (2).
- Demarest, Bruce (1997). EThe Cross and Salvation: The Doctrine of Salvation. Wheaton: Crossway.
- Denzinger, Henricus (1954). Enchiridion Symbolorum et Definitionum (30th ed.). Freiburg im Breisgau: Herder.
- Erickson, Millard J. (1990). Christian theology (1st one volume ed.). Grand Rapids, MI: Baker Books House.
- Fitzgerald, Allan D, ed. (1999). "Aratia Christi et de peccato originali, De". Augustine Through the Ages: An Encyclopedia. Grand Rapids, MI: Wm B Eerdmans.
- Forlines, F. Leroy (2011). Pinson, J. Matthew (ed.). Classical Arminianism: A Theology of Salvation. Randall House. ISBN 978-0-89265-607-3.
- Gribben, Crawford; Tweeddale, John W. (2022). T&T Clark Handbook of John Owen. London: T&T Clark.
- Grudem, Wayne (1994). Systematic Theology. Grand Rapids: IVP.
- Hägglund, Bengt (2007) [1968]. Teologins historia [History of Theology] (in German). Translated by Gene J. Lund (4th rev. ed.). St. Louis, MO: Concordia Publishing House.
- Hayden-Roy, Priscilla A. (2023). A Foretaste of Heaven: Friedrich Hölderlin in the Context of Württemberg Pietism. Leiden: Brill. ISBN 9789004654617.
- Heavner, Chris (22 October 2024). "Justification by Grace through Faith!". Evangelical Lutheran Church of America.
- Helm, Paul (2010). Calvin at the Centre. Oxford: Oxford University Press.
- James, Frank A. III (1998). Peter Martyr Vermigli and Predestination: The Augustinian Inheritance of an Italian Reformer. Oxford: Clarendon.
- John Paul II (1993). Catechism of the Catholic Church Second Edition Apostolic Constitution Fidei Depositum (PDF). Citta del Vaticano: Libreria Editrice Vaticana.
- Keathley, Kenneth D. (2010). Salvation and Sovereignty: A Molinist Approach. Nashville: B&H Publishing Group.
- Kimbrough, S. T. (2002). Orthodox and Wesleyan Spirituality. Crestwood: St Vladimir's Seminary Press.
- Kuyper, Abraham (2016). Common Grace: God's Gifts for a Fallen World. Vol. 1. Bellingham, WA: Lexham Press.
- McGrath, Alister E. (2001). Christian Theology: An Introduction. Cambridge: Blackwell Publishers.
- McGrath, Alister E. (2005). Iustitia Dei: a history of the Christian doctrine of justification. Cambridge: Cambridge University Press.
- Melton, J. Gordon (2005). Encyclopedia of Protestantism. Infobase Publishing.
- NPH (2017). MANUAL 2017–2021. Indianapolis: Nazarene Publishing House.
- Oakley, Francis (1988). The Medieval Experience: Foundations of Western Cultural Singularity. Toronto: University of Toronto Press.
- Oden, Thomas (1994). John Wesley's Scriptural Christianity: A Plain Exposition of His Teaching on Christian Doctrine. Grand Rapids, MI: Zondervan.
- Olson, Roger E. (2009). Arminian Theology: Myths and Realities. Downers Grove: InterVarsity Press.
- Overbeck, J. J., ed. (1899). The acts and decrees of the Synod of Jerusalem, sometimes called the Council of Bethlehem, holden under Dositheus, Patriarch of Jerusalem in 1672. Translated by Robertson, James Nathaniel William Beauchamp. London: T. Baker.
- PF (1948). Catechism of the Pillar of Fire Church. Denver, CO: Pillar of Fire Church.
- Picirilli, Robert E. (2002). Grace, Faith, Free Will: Contrasting Views of Salvation: Calvinism and Arminianism. Nashville: Randall House Publications.
- Pickar, C. H. (1981) [1967]. The New Catholic Encyclopedia. Vol. 5. Washington D.C.
- Pink, Arthur W. (2009). Studies on Saving Faith. Zeeland, MI: Reformed church Publications.
- Pinson, J. Matthew (2022). 40 Questions about Arminianism. Grand Rapids, MI: Kregel Publications.
- Ray, Ronald R. (2022). Systematics Critical and Constructive 2: With Compendium Interactions. Eugene, OR: Wipf and Stock Publishers.
- Reasoner, Vic (2014). "John Wesley's Doctrines on the Theology of Grace". Grace for all: the Arminian dynamics of salvation. Eugene, OR: Resource Publications.
- Robinson, Geoffrey D. (2022). Saved by Grace through Faith or Saved by Decree?: A Biblical and Theological Critique of Calvinist Soteriology. Eugene, OR: Wipf and Stock Publishers.
- Schreiner, Thomas R.; Ware, Bruce A. (2000). Still Sovereign: Contemporary Perspectives on Election, Foreknowledge, and Grace. Baker Books.
- Schwartz, Wm Andrew; Bechtold, John M. (2015). Embracing the Past--Forging the Future: A New Generation of Wesleyan Theology. Eugene: Wipf and Stock Publishers.
- Shelton, Brian (2015). "Prevenient Grace: Two Helpful Distinctions". Seedbed.
- Stanglin, Keith D.; McCall, Thomas H. (2012). Jacob Arminius: Theologian of Grace. New York: OUP USA.
- Stewart, H. F. (2014). Thirteen Homilies of St Augustine on St John XIV. Cambridge: Cambridge University Press.
- Thorsen, Don (2007). An Exploration of Christian Theology. Grand Rapids: Baker Books.
- UMPH (2004). The Book of Discipline of The United Methodist Church. Nashville: United Methodist Publishing House.
- Walls, Jerry L.; Dongell, Joseph (2004). Why I am not a Calvinist. Downers Grove, IL: InterVarsity Press.
- Waterworth, J. (1848). The Council of Trent. London: Dolman.
- Westerfield Tucker, Karen B. (2011). American Methodist Worship. Oxford: Oxford University Press.
- Wiley, H. Orton (1940). Christian theology. Vol. 1. Kansas City, MO: Beacon Hill Press.
- Wilson, Kenneth (2018). Augustine's Conversion from Traditional Free Choice to "Non-free Free Will: A Comprehensive Methodology. Tübingen: Mohr Siebeck.
