= Effectual calling =

God calling a person to himself

Effectual calling (or effective calling), in Calvinist Christian soteriology, is a stage in the ordo salutis in which God calls a person to himself. It is connected with, but different from external calling, in which a person hears the gospel message.

Wayne Grudem suggests that it is a summons from the King of the universe that has "such power that it brings about the response that it asks for in people's hearts." Grudem appeals to the story of Lydia: according to Acts 16:14, "The Lord opened her heart to respond to Paul’s message" (NIV).

== See also ==
- Irresistible grace
- Prevenient grace
