= Free will in theology =

The discussion of free will in religion, specially in religious philosophy, is an important part of the debate on free will in general. Throughout history, the belief that the entire universe is a deterministic system subject to the will of destiny has been articulated in both Eastern and Western religions, which can enter in dispute with the concept of free will.

In theology, the doctrine of omniscience is often alleged to be in conflict with free will; as if divine foreknowledge knows exactly what will happen (right down to every choice a person makes), it would seem that the "freedom" of these choices is called into question. Theologians vary greatly in their response to the standard argument against free will and thus might appeal to any number of responses to this paradox of free will.

== Overview ==
The problem between religious determinism and free will relates to Aristotle's analysis of the problem of the sea battle: tomorrow either there will or will not be a sea battle. According to the Law of Excluded Middle, there seem to be two options. If there will be a sea battle, then it seems that it was true even yesterday that there would be one. Thus it is necessary that the sea battle will occur. If there will not be one, then, by similar reasoning, it is necessary that it will not occur. That means that the future, whatever it is, is completely fixed by past truths: true propositions about the future (a deterministic conclusion is reached: things could not have been any other way).

However, some philosophers follow William of Ockham (c. 1287 – 1347) in holding that necessity and possibility are defined with respect to a given point in time and a given matrix of empirical circumstances, and so something that is merely possible from the perspective of one observer may be necessary from the perspective of an omniscient. Some philosophers follow Philo in holding that free will is a feature of a human's soul, and thus that non-human animals lack free will.

== Common defenses ==
Jewish philosophy stresses that free will is a product of the intrinsic human soul, using the word neshama (from the Hebrew root n.sh.m. or .נ.ש.מ meaning "breath"), but the ability to make a free choice is through Yechida (from Hebrew word "yachid", יחיד, singular), the part of the soul that is united with God, the only being that is not hindered by or dependent on cause and effect (thus, freedom of will does not belong to the realm of the physical reality, and inability of natural philosophy to account for it is expected).

In Islam, the theological issue is not usually how to reconcile free will with God's foreknowledge but with God's jabr or divine commanding power. al-Ash'ari developed an "acquisition" or "dual-agency" form of compatibilism, in which human free will and divine jabr were both asserted, and which became a cornerstone of the dominant Ash'ari position. In Shia Islam, Ash'aris understanding of a higher balance toward predestination is challenged by most theologists. Free will, according to Islamic doctrine is the main factor for man's accountability in his/her actions throughout life. All actions committed by man's free will are said to be counted on the Day of Judgement because they are his/her own and not God's.

The philosopher Søren Kierkegaard claimed that divine omnipotence cannot be separated from divine goodness. As a truly omnipotent and good being, God could create beings with true freedom over God. Furthermore, God would voluntarily do so because "the greatest good... which can be done for a being, greater than anything else that one can do for it, is to be truly free." Alvin Plantinga's free-will defense is a contemporary expansion of this theme, adding how God, free will, and evil are consistent.

== Christianity ==
=== Academic views ===
The consensus of scholars who focus on the study of free will in the ancient world is that the Bible does not explicitly address free will.

The leading scholar on the subject of free will in antiquity, Michael Frede, observed that "freedom and free will cannot be found in either the Septuagint or the New Testament and must have come to the Christians mainly from Stoicism."

Frede wrote that he could not find either the language of free will nor even any assumption of it in the New Testament or the Greek Old Testament. According to Frede, the early Church fathers most certainly developed their doctrine of free will from the pagans.

Another Oxford scholar, Dr. Alister McGrath, concurs entirely with Frede, "The term 'free will' is not biblical, but derives from Stoicism. It was introduced into Western Christianity by the second-century theologian Tertullian."

Pauline expert, Troels Engberg-Pedersen, unequivocally insists that, "Paul firmly believed in divine determination as an intrinsic part of his whole conception of God." Paul understood freedom as "freedom of wanting what God wills".

==== The implicit argument ====
Nonetheless, many have argued an "implicit" case for finding free will in the Bible. The most fundamental source for this case lies in the fall into sin by Adam and Eve that occurred in their "willfully chosen" disobedience to God.

Some contend that "freedom" and "free will" can be treated as one because the two terms are commonly used as synonyms; however, there are widespread disagreements in definitions of the two terms. Because of these disagreements, Christian philosopher Mortimer Adler found that a delineation of three kinds of freedom is necessary for clarity on the subject, as follows:

(1) Circumstantial freedom is "freedom from coercion or restraint" that prevents acting as one wills.

- In the Bible, circumstantial freedom was given to the Israelites in The Exodus from slavery in Egypt.

(2) Natural freedom (a.k.a. volitional freedom) is freedom to determine one's own "decisions or plans." Natural freedom is inherent in all people, in all circumstances, and "without regard to any state of mind or character which they may or may not acquire in the course of their lives."

- Other theologians, paralleling Adler, view all humanity as naturally possessing the "free choice of the will."

(3) Acquired freedom is freedom "to live as [one] ought to live," a freedom that requires a transformation whereby a person acquires a righteous, holy, healthy, etc. "state of mind or character."

- The Bible testifies to the need for acquired freedom because no one "is free for obedience and faith till he is freed from sin's dominion." People possess natural freedom but their "voluntary choices" serve sin until they acquire freedom from "sin's dominion." The New Bible Dictionary denotes this acquired freedom for "obedience and faith" as "free will" in a theological sense. Therefore, in biblical thinking, an acquired freedom from being "enslaved to sin" is needed "to live up to Jesus' commandments to love God and love neighbor."
- Jesus told his hearers that they needed to be made "free indeed" (John 8:36). "Free indeed [ontós]" means "truly free" or "really free," as it is in some translations. Being made "free indeed" means freedom from "bondage to sin." This acquired freedom is "freedom to serve the Lord." Being "free indeed" (i.e., true freedom) comes by "God's changing our nature" to free us from being "slaves to sin." and endowing us with "the freedom to choose to be righteous."

Mark R. Talbot, a "classical Christian theist," views this acquired "compatibilist freedom" as the freedom that "Scripture portrays as worth having."

Open theism denies that classical theism's compatibilist "freedom to choose to be righteous without the possibility of choosing otherwise." qualifies as true freedom. For open theism, true libertarian freedom is incompatibilist freedom. Regardless of factors, a person has the freedom to choose the opposite alternatives. In open theist William Hasker's words, regarding any action it is always "within the agent's power to perform the action and also in the agent's power to refrain from the action." Although open theism generally contradicts classical theism's "freedom to choose to be righteous without the possibility of choosing otherwise," Hasker allows that Jesus possessed and humans in heaven will possess such freedom. Regarding Jesus, Hasker views Jesus as "a free agent," but he also thinks that "it was not really possible" that Jesus would "abort the mission." Regarding heaven, Hasker foresees that as the result of our choice we will be "unable to sin" because all sinful impulses will be gone.

At an implicit level, the Old Testament supports both the thesis and the antithesis (that free will exists or not).

=== Roman Catholic ===
Today, theologians of the Roman Catholic Church universally embrace the idea of free will, but generally do not view free will as existing apart from or in contradiction to grace. According to the Roman Catholic Church "To God, all moments of time are present in their immediacy. When therefore he establishes his eternal plan of "predestination", he includes in it each person's free response to his grace." The Council of Trent (1545-1563) had declared that "the free will of man, moved and excited by God, can by its consent co-operate with God, Who excites and invites its action; and that it can thereby dispose and prepare itself to obtain the grace of justification. The will can resist grace if it chooses. It is not like a lifeless thing, which remains purely passive. Weakened and diminished by Adam's fall, free will is yet not destroyed in the race (Sess. VI, cap. i and v)."

During the era of the original Jesuits, a movement arose in Catholicism called Jansenism, which contradicted the Jesuits' teaching on free will. French Philosopher, Blaise Pascal was an adherent of this theology. There are no modern adherents of Jansenism.

St. Augustine and St. Thomas Aquinas wrote extensively on free will, with Augustine focusing on the importance of free will in his responses to the Manichaeans, and also on the limitations of a concept of unlimited free will as denial of grace, in his refutations of Pelagius.

Denying the Roman Catholic teaching, John Duns Scotus asserted that "the created will acts just for internal reasons, and therefore contingently in all circumstances", even in Heaven, "regardless of the perfection of the object presented by the intellect." On the contrary, the Roman Catholic teaching affirms that when God—the proper object of the will—is known with sufficient clarity in the afterlife, then "the perpetuity" of the free will's act is necessary and "in Heaven is guaranteed by the absence of reason for the will to will something else."

The Catechism of the Roman Catholic Church asserts that "Freedom is the power, rooted in reason and will". It goes on to say that "God created man a rational being, conferring on him the dignity of a person who can initiate and control his own actions. God willed that man should be 'left in the hand of his own counsel,' so that he might of his own accord seek his Creator and freely attain his full and blessed perfection by cleaving to him."" The section concludes with the role that grace plays, "By the working of grace the Holy Spirit educates us in spiritual freedom in order to make us free collaborators in his work in the Church and in the world."

Reformed Latin Christianity's views on free will and grace are often contrasted with predestination in Reformed Protestant Christianity, especially after the Counter-Reformation, but in understanding differing conceptions of free will it is just as important to understand the differing conceptions of the nature of God, focusing on the idea that God can be all-powerful and all-knowing even while people continue to exercise free will, because God transcends time.

The papal encyclical on human freedom, Libertas Praestantissimum by Pope Leo XIII (1888), seems to leave the question unresolved as to the relation between free will and determinism: whether the correct notion is the compatibilist one or the libertarian one. The quotations supporting compatibilism include the one from St. Thomas (footnote 4) near the end of paragraph 6, regarding the cause of evil ("Whereas, when he sins, he acts in opposition to reason, is moved by another, and is the victim of foreign misapprehensions"), and a similar passus suggesting a natural, cause-and-effect function of human will ("harmony with his natural inclinations", "Creator of will", "by whom all things are moved in conformity with their nature") near the end of paragraph 8 (when considering the problem of how grace can have effects on free will). On the other hand, metaphysical libertarianism – at least as a sort of possibility of reversing the direction of one's acting – is suggested by the reference to the well-known philosophical term metaphysical freedom at the beginning of paragraph 3 and, to an extent, a contrasting comparison of animals, which always act "of necessity", with human liberty, by means of which one can "either act or not act, do this or do that".

Critique that seems more or less to support popular incompatibilistic views can be found in some papal documents especially in the 20th century, no explicit condemnation, however, of causal determinism in its most generic form can be found there. More often these documents focus on condemnation of physicalism/materialism and the stressing of significance of belief in soul, as a non-physical indivisible substance equipped with intellect and will, which decides human proceeding in a (perhaps imprecise) way.

=== Orthodox Christianity ===
==== Oriental Orthodox ====
The concept of free will is also of vital importance in the Oriental (or non-Chalcedonian) Churches, those in communion with the Coptic Orthodox Church of Alexandria. As in Judaism, free will is regarded as axiomatic. Everyone is regarded as having a free choice as to in what measure he or she will follow his or her conscience or arrogance, these two having been appointed for each individual. The more one follows one's conscience, the more it brings one good results, and the more one follows one's arrogance, the more it brings one bad results. Following only one's arrogance is sometimes likened to the dangers of falling into a pit while walking in pitch darkness, without the light of conscience to illuminate the path. Very similar doctrines have also found written expression in the Dead Sea Scrolls "Manual of Discipline", and in some religious texts possessed by the Beta Israel Jews of Ethiopia.

==== Eastern Orthodox ====
The Eastern (or Chalcedonian) Orthodox Church espouses a belief different from the Lutheran, Calvinist, and Arminian Protestant views. The difference is in the interpretation of original sin, alternatively known as "ancestral sin," where the Orthodox do not believe in total depravity. The Orthodox reject the Pelagian view that the original sin did not damage human nature; they accept that the human nature is depraved, but despite man's fallenness the divine image he bears has not been destroyed.

The Orthodox Church holds to the teaching of synergy (συνεργός, meaning working together), which says that man has the freedom to, and must if he wants to be saved, choose to accept and work with the grace of God. St. John Cassian, a 4th-century Church Father and pupil of St. John Chrysostom, articulated this view and all the Eastern Fathers embraced it. He taught that "Divine grace is necessary to enable a sinner to return unto God and live, yet man must first, of himself, desire and attempt to choose and obey God", and that "Divine grace is indispensable for salvation, but it does not necessarily need to precede a free human choice, because, despite the weakness of human volition, the will can take the initiative toward God.".

Some Orthodox Christians use the parable of a drowning man to plainly illustrate the teaching of synergy: God from the ship throws a rope to a drowning man, pulls him up, saving him, and the man, if he wants to be saved, must hold on tightly to the rope; explaining both that salvation is a gift from God and man cannot save himself, and that man must co-work (syn-ergo) with God in the process of salvation.

Fyodor Dostoevsky, the Russian Orthodox Christian novelist, suggested many arguments for and against free will. Famous arguments are found in "The Grand Inquisitor" chapter in The Brothers Karamazov, and in his work Notes from Underground. He also developed an argument that suicide, if irrational, is actually a validation of free will (see Kirilov in the Demons novel). As for the argument presented in The Brothers Karamazov's section "The Rebellion" that the suffering of innocents was not worth the price of free will, Dostoevsky appears to propose the idea of apocatastasis (or universal reconciliation) as one possible rational solution.

Roman Catholic teaching

Illustrating as it does that the human part in salvation (represented by holding on to the rope) must be preceded and accompanied by grace (represented by the casting and drawing of the rope), the image of the drowning man holding on to the rope cast and drawn by his rescuer corresponds closely to Roman Catholic teaching, which holds that God, who "destined us in love to be his sons" and "to be conformed to the image of his Son", includes in his eternal plan of "predestination" each person's free response to his grace.

The Roman Catholic Church holds to the teaching that "by free will, (the human person) is capable of directing himself toward his true good ... man is endowed with freedom, an outstanding manifestation of the divine image'." Man has free will either to accept or reject the grace of God, so that for salvation "there is a kind of interplay, or synergy, between human freedom and divine grace". "Justification establishes cooperation between God's grace and man's freedom. On man's part it is expressed by the assent of faith to the Word of God, which invites him to conversion, and in the cooperation of charity with the prompting of the Holy Spirit who precedes and preserves his assent: 'When God touches man's heart through the illumination of the Holy Spirit, man himself is not inactive while receiving that inspiration, since he could reject it; and yet, without God's grace, he cannot by his own free will move himself toward justice in God's sight' (Council of Trent)."

God has freely chosen to associate man with the work of his grace. the fatherly action of God is first on his own initiative, and then follows man's free acting through his collaboration. For Roman Catholics, therefore, human cooperation with grace is essential. When God establishes his eternal plan of 'predestination', he includes in it each person's free response to his grace, whether it is positive or negative: "In this city, in fact, both Herod and Pontius Pilate, with the Gentiles and the peoples of Israel, gathered together against your holy servant Jesus, whom you anointed, to do whatever your hand and your plan had predestined to take place" (Acts 4:27–28).

The initiative comes from God, but it demands a free response from man: "God has freely chosen to associate man with the work of his grace. the fatherly action of God is first on his own initiative, and then follows man's free acting through his collaboration". "Since the initiative belongs to God in the order of grace, no one can merit the initial grace of forgiveness and justification, at the beginning of conversion. Moved by the Holy Spirit and by charity, we can then merit for ourselves and for others the graces needed for our sanctification, for the increase of grace and charity, and for the attainment of eternal life."

Orthodox criticism of Roman Catholic theology

Orthodox theologian Vladimir Lossky has stated that the teaching of John Cassian, who in the East is considered a witness to Tradition, but who "was unable to make himself correctly understood", "was interpreted, on the rational plane, as a semi-pelagianism, and was condemned in the West". Where the Roman Catholic Church defends the concept of faith and free will these are questioned in the East by the conclusions of the Second Council of Orange. This council is not accepted by the Eastern churches and the Roman Catholic Church's use of describing their position and St Cassian as Semi-Pelagian is also rejected.

Although the Roman Catholic Church explicitly teaches that "original sin does not have the character of a personal fault in any of Adam's descendants", some Eastern Orthodox nevertheless claim that Roman Catholicism professes the teaching, which they attribute to Saint Augustine, that everyone bears not only the consequence, but also the guilt of Adam's sin.

=== Differences of view between Roman Catholic and Orthodox Churches ===
Various Roman Catholic theologians identify Cassian as a teacher of the semipelagian heresy which was condemned by the Council of Orange. While the Orthodox do not apply the term semipelagian to their theology, they criticize the Roman Catholics for rejecting Cassian whom they accept as fully orthodox, and for holding that human consent to God's justifying action is itself an effect of grace, a position shared by Eastern Orthodox theologian Georges Florovsky, who says that the Eastern Orthodox Church "always understood that God initiates, accompanies, and completes everything in the process of salvation", rejecting instead the Calvinist idea of irresistible grace.

Recently, some Roman Catholic theologians have argued that Cassian's writings should not be considered semipelagian. And scholars of other denominations too have concluded that Cassian's thought "is not Semi-Pelagian", and that he instead taught that "salvation is, from beginning to end, the effect of God's grace" and held that "God's grace, not human free will, is responsible for 'everything which pertains to salvation' - even faith."

The Orthodox Church holds to the teaching of synergy (συνεργός, meaning working together), which says that man has the freedom to, and must if he wants to be saved, choose to accept and work with the grace of God. Once baptised the experience of his salvation and relationship with God is called theosis. Mankind has free will to accept or reject the grace of God. Rejection of the gifts of God is called blasphemy of the Holy Spirit (gifts of grace, faith, life). The first who defined this teaching was John Cassian, 4th-century Church Father, and a pupil of John Chrysostom, and all Eastern Fathers accept it. He taught that "Divine grace is necessary to enable a sinner to return unto God and live, yet man must first, of himself, desire and attempt to choose and obey God", and that "Divine grace is indispensable for salvation, but it does not necessarily need to precede a free human choice, because, despite the weakness of human volition, the will can take the initiative toward God.".

Some Orthodox use an example of a drowning man to illustrate the teaching of synergy: God from the ship throws a rope to a drowning man, the man may take the rope if he wants to be saved, but he may decide not to take the rope and perish by his own will. Explaining both that salvation is a gift from God and man cannot save himself. That man must co-work (syn-ergo) with God in the process of salvation.

=== Protestant ===
==== Lutheranism ====
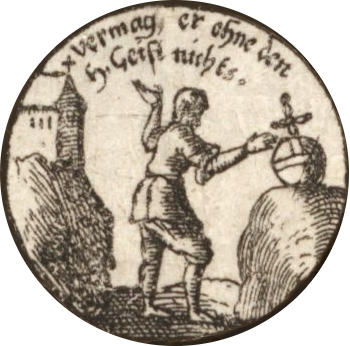
A.C. Article 18: Of Free Will

Lutherans adhere to divine monergism, the teaching that salvation is by God's act alone, and therefore reject the idea that humans in their fallen state have a free will concerning spiritual matters. Lutherans believe that although humans have free will concerning civil righteousness, they cannot work spiritual righteousness without the Holy Spirit, since righteousness in the heart cannot be wrought in the absence of the Holy Spirit. In other words, humanity is free to choose and act in every regard except for the choice of salvation.

Lutherans also teach that sinners, while capable of doing works that are outwardly "good," are not capable of doing works that satisfy God's justice. Every human thought and deed is infected with sin and sinful motives. For Luther himself, in his Bondage of the Will, people are by nature endowed with free-will/free choice in regard to "goods and possessions" with which a person "has the right of using, acting, and omitting according to his Free-will." However, in "God-ward" things pertaining to "salvation or damnation" people are in bondage "either to the will of God, or to the will of Satan."

As found in Paul Althaus' study of Luther's theology, sin's infection of every human thought and deed began with Adam's fall into sin, the Original Sin. Adam's fall was a "terrible example" of what "free will" will do unless God constantly motivates it to virtuous behavior. Humanity inherits Adam's sin. Thus, in our "natural condition," we have an inborn desire to sin because that is the person we are by birth. As Luther noted, "Adam sinned willingly and freely and from him a will to sin has been born into us so that we cannot sin innocently but only voluntarily."

The controversial term liberum arbitrium was translated "free-will" by Henry Cole and "free will" remains in general use. However, the Rupp/Watson study of Luther and Erasmus chose "free choice" as the translation and provided a rationale. Luther used "free choice" (or "free-will") to denote the fact that humans act "spontaneously" and with "a desirous willingness." He also allowed "Free-will" as that "power" by which humans "can be caught by the Spirit" of God. However, he deplored the use of the term "Free-will" because it is too "grand, copious, and full." Therefore, Luther held that the inborn faculty of "willingness" should be "called by some other term."

Although our wills are a function of and are in bondage to our inherited sinful desires, Luther insisted that we sin "voluntarily." Voluntarily means that we sin of our own free will. We will to do what we desire. As long as we desire sin, our wills are only free for sin. This is Luther's "bondage of the will" to sin. The sinner's "will is bound, but it is and remains his will. He repeatedly and voluntarily acts according to it." So it is, to be set free from sin and for righteousness requires a "rebirth through faith." A rebirth of faith gives "true freedom from sin," which is, wrote Luther, "a liberty [freedom] to do good."

To use a biblical word important to Luther, to be set free from sin and for righteousness requires a metanoia. Luther used Jesus' image of the good and bad trees to depict the necessity of changing the person to change what a person wills and does. In Jesus' image, "a good tree cannot bear bad fruit, and a bad tree cannot bear good fruit" (Matthew 7:18). Like the bad tree that can only produce bad fruit, before a rebirth through faith, people are in bondage to the sinful desires of their hearts. They can only will to do sin, albeit "spontaneously and with a desirous willingness." Given his view of the human condition, Luther concluded that, without a rebirth, the "free choice" that all humans possess is "not free at all" because it cannot of itself free itself from its inherent bondage to sin.

Thus, Luther distinguished between different kinds of freedom: (a) by nature, a freedom to act as we will and (b) by rebirth through faith, a freedom to act righteously.

===== God and creation =====
Orthodox Lutheran theology holds that God made the world, including humanity, perfect, holy and sinless. However, Adam and Eve chose to disobey God, trusting in their own strength, knowledge, and wisdom. Consequently, people are saddled with original sin, born sinful and unable to avoid committing sinful acts. For Lutherans, original sin is the "chief sin, a root and fountainhead of all actual sins."

According to Lutherans, God preserves his creation, in doing so cooperates with everything that happens, and guides the universe. While God cooperates with both good and evil deeds, with evil deeds he does so only inasmuch as they are deeds, but not with the evil in them. God concurs with an act's effect, but he does not cooperate in the corruption of an act or the evil of its effect. Lutherans believe everything exists for the sake of the Christian Church, and that God guides everything for its welfare and growth.

===== Predestination =====
Lutherans believe that the elect are predestined to salvation. Lutherans believe Christians should be assured that they are among the predestined. Lutherans believe that all who trust in Jesus alone can be certain of their salvation, for it is in Christ's work and his promises in which their certainty lies. According to Lutheranism, the central final hope of the Christian is "the resurrection of the body and the life everlasting" as confessed in the Apostles' Creed rather than predestination. Conversion or regeneration in the strict sense of the term is the work of divine grace and power by which man, born of the flesh, and void of all power to think, to will, or to do any good thing, and dead in sin is, through the gospel and holy baptism, taken from a state of sin and spiritual death under God's wrath into a state of spiritual life of faith and grace, rendered able to will and to do what is spiritually good and, especially, led to accept the benefits of the redemption which is in Christ Jesus.

Lutherans disagree with those that make predestination the source of salvation rather than Christ's suffering, death, and resurrection. Lutherans reject the Calvinist doctrine of the perseverance of the saints. Like both Calvinist camps, Lutherans view the work of salvation as monergistic in that "the natural [that is, corrupted and divinely unrenewed] powers of man cannot do anything or help towards salvation" (Formula of Concord: Solid Declaration, art. ii, par. 71), and Lutherans go further along the same lines as the Free Grace advocates to say that the recipient of saving grace need not cooperate with it. Hence, Lutherans believe that a true Christian (that is, a genuine recipient of saving grace) can lose his or her salvation, "[b]ut the cause is not as though God were unwilling to grant grace for perseverance to those in whom He has begun the good work... [but that these persons] wilfully turn away..." (Formula of Concord: Solid Declaration, art. xi, par. 42). Unlike Calvinists, Lutherans do not believe in a predestination to damnation. Instead, Lutherans teach eternal damnation is a result of the unbeliever's sins, rejection of the forgiveness of sins, and unbelief.

==== Anabaptism ====
The Anabaptist movement was characterized by the fundamental belief in the free will of man. Many earlier movements such as Waldensians and others likewise held this viewpoint. Denominations today representing this view include Old Order Mennonites, Amish, Conservative Mennonites and Ukrainian Baptists.

==== Calvinism ====
John Calvin ascribed "free will" to all people in the sense that they act "voluntarily, and not by compulsion." He elaborated his position by allowing "that man has choice and that it is self-determined" and that his actions stem from "his own voluntary choosing."

The free will that Calvin ascribed to all people is what Mortimer Adler calls the "natural freedom" of the will. This freedom to will what one desires is inherent in all people.

Calvin held this kind of inherent/natural free will in disesteem because unless people acquire the freedom to live as they ought by being transformed, they will desire and voluntarily choose to sin. "Man is said to have free will," wrote Calvin, "because he acts voluntarily, and not by compulsion. This is perfectly true: but why should so small a matter have been dignified with so proud a title?" The glitch in this inherent/natural freedom of the will is that although all people have the "faculty of willing," by nature they are unavoidably (and yet voluntarily without compulsion) under "the bondage of sin."

The kind of free will that Calvin esteems is what Adler calls "acquired freedom" of the will, the freedom/ability "to live as [one] ought." To possess acquired free will requires a change by which a person acquires a desire to live a life marked by virtuous qualities. As Calvin describes the change required for acquired freedom, the will "must be wholly transformed and renovated."

Calvin depicts this transformation as "a new heart and a new spirit (Ezek. 18:31)." It sets one free from "bondage to sin" and enables "piety towards God, and love towards men, general holiness and purity of life."

Calvinist Protestants embrace the idea of predestination, namely, that God chose who would be saved and who would be not saved prior to the creation. They quote Ephesians 1:4 "For he chose us in him before the creation of the world to be holy and blameless in his sight" and also 2:8 "For it is by grace you are saved, through faith, and this not of yourselves, it is the gift of God." One of the strongest defenders of this theological point of view was the American Puritan preacher and theologian Jonathan Edwards.

Edwards believed that indeterminism was incompatible with individual dependence on God and hence with his sovereignty. He reasoned that if individuals' responses to God's grace are contra-causally free, then their salvation depends partly on them and therefore God's sovereignty is not "absolute and universal." Edwards' book Freedom of the Will defends theological determinism. In this book, Edwards attempts to show that libertarianism is incoherent. For example, he argues that by 'self-determination' the libertarian must mean either that one's actions including one's acts of willing are preceded by an act of free will or that one's acts of will lack sufficient causes. The first leads to an infinite regress while the second implies that acts of will happen accidentally and hence can't make someone "better or worse, any more than a tree is better than other trees because it oftener happens to be lit upon by a swan or nightingale; or a rock more vicious than other rocks, because rattlesnakes have happened oftener to crawl over it."

It should not be thought that this view completely denies freedom of choice, however. It claims that man is free to act on his strongest moral impulse and volition, which is externally determined, but is not free to act contrary to them, or to alter them. Proponents, such as John L. Girardeau, have indicated their belief that moral neutrality is impossible; that even if it were possible, and one were equally inclined to contrary options, one could make no choice at all; that if one is inclined, however slightly, toward one option, then that person will necessarily choose that one over any others.

Some non-Calvinist Christians attempt a reconciliation of the dual concepts of predestination and free will by pointing to the situation of God as Christ. In taking the form of a man, a necessary element of this process was that Jesus Christ lived the existence of a mortal. When Jesus was born he was not born with the omniscient power of God the Creator, but with the mind of a human child - yet he was still God in essence. The precedent this creates is that God is able to will the abandonment of His knowledge, or ignore knowledge, while remaining fully God. Thus it is not inconceivable that although omniscience demands that God knows what the future holds for individuals, it is within his power to deny this knowledge in order to preserve individual free will. Other theologians argue that the Calvinist-Edwardsean view suggests that if all human volitions are predetermined by God, then all actions dictated by fallen will of man necessarily satisfy His sovereign decree. Hence, it is impossible to act outside of God's perfect will, a conclusion some non-Calvinists claim poses a serious problem for ethics and moral theology.

An early proposal toward such a reconciliation states that God is, in fact, not aware of future events, but rather, being eternal, He is outside time, and sees the past, present, and future as one whole creation. Consequently, it is not as though God would know "in advance" that Jeffrey Dahmer would become guilty of homicide years prior to the event as an example, but that He was aware of it from all eternity, viewing all time as a single present. This was the view offered by Boethius in Book V of The Consolation of Philosophy.

Calvinist theologian Loraine Boettner argued that the doctrine of divine foreknowledge does not escape the alleged problems of divine foreordination. He wrote that "what God foreknows must, in the very nature of the case, be as fixed and certain as what is foreordained; and if one is inconsistent with the free agency of man, the other is also. Foreordination renders the events certain, while foreknowledge presupposes that they are certain." Some Christian theologians, feeling the bite of this argument, have opted to limit the doctrine of foreknowledge if not do away with it altogether, thus forming a new school of thought, similar to Socinianism and process theology, called open theism.

==== Arminianism ====
Christians who were influenced by the teachings of Jacobus Arminius (such as Methodists) believe that while God is all-knowing and always knows what choices each person will make, he still gives them the ability to choose or not choose everything, regardless of whether there are any internal or external factors contributing to that choice.

Like John Calvin, Arminius affirmed total depravity, but Arminius believed that only prevenient grace allowed people to choose salvation:

Concerning grace and free will, this is what I teach according to the Scriptures and orthodox consent: Free will is unable to begin or to perfect any true and spiritual good, without grace.... This grace [prœvenit] goes before, accompanies, and follows; it excites, assists, operates that we will, and cooperates lest we will in vain.

Prevenient grace is divine grace which precedes human decision. It exists prior to and without reference to anything humans may have done. As humans are corrupted by the effects of sin, prevenient grace allows persons to engage their God-given free will to choose the salvation offered by God in Jesus Christ or to reject that salvific offer. Methodist theology thus teaches:

Our Lord Jesus Christ did so die for all men as to make salvation attainable by every man that cometh into the world. If men are not saved that fault is entirely their own, lying solely in their own unwillingness to obtain the salvation offered to them. (John 1:9; I Thess. 5:9; Titus 2:11-12).

Thomas Jay Oord offers perhaps the most cogent free will theology presupposing prevenient grace. What he calls "essential kenosis" says God acts preveniently to give freedom/agency to all creatures. This gift comes from God's eternal essence, and is therefore necessary. God remains free in choosing how to love, but the fact that God loves and therefore gives freedom/agency to others is a necessary part of what it means to be divine.

This view is backed in the Bible with verses such as Luke 13:34, NKJV

O Jerusalem, Jerusalem, the one who kills the prophets and stones those who are sent to her! How often I wanted to gather your children together, as a hen gathers her brood under her wings, but you were not willing!"

Here we see Jesus lamenting that He is unable to save Jerusalem as they are not willing to be saved; He respects their choice regardless of His will.

==== Comparison of Protestants ====
This table summarizes three classical Protestant beliefs about free will.

John Calvin	Martin Luther	Jacob Arminius
For Calvin, humanity possesses "free will," but it is in bondage to sin, unless it is "transformed."	For Luther, humanity possesses free-will/free choice in regard to "goods and possessions," but regarding "salvation or damnation" people are in bondage either to God or Satan."	For Arminius, humanity possesses freedom from necessity, but not "freedom from sin" unless enabled by "prevenient grace."

=== Latter Day Saints ===
Latter Day Saints believe that God has given all humans the gift of moral agency. Moral agency includes free will and agency. Proper exercise of unfettered choice leads to the ultimate goal of returning to God's presence. Having the choice to do right or wrong was important, because God wants a society of a certain type—those that comply with eternal laws. Before this Earth was created, this dispute over agency rose to the level that there was a "war in heaven." Lucifer (who favored no agency) and his followers were cast out of heaven for rebelling against God's will. Many Mormon leaders have also taught that the battle in Heaven over agency is now being carried out on earth, where dictators, influenced by Satan, fight against freedom (or free agency) in governments contrary to the will of God.

Mormons also believe in a limited form of foreordination — not in deterministic, unalterable decrees, but rather in callings from God for individuals to perform specific missions in mortality. Those who are foreordained can reject the foreordination, either outright or by transgressing the laws of God and becoming unworthy to fulfill the call.

=== New Church ===
The New Church, or Swedenborgianism, teaches that every person has complete freedom to choose heaven or hell. Emanuel Swedenborg, upon whose writings the New Church is founded, argued that if God is love itself, people must have free will. If God is love itself, then He desires no harm to come to anyone: and so it is impossible that he would predestine anyone to hell. On the other hand, if God is love itself, then He must love things outside of Himself; and if people do not have the freedom to choose evil, they are simply extensions of God, and He cannot love them as something outside of Himself. In addition, Swedenborg argues that if a person does not have free will to choose goodness and faith, then all of the commandments in the Bible to love God and the neighbor are worthless, since no one can choose to do them - and it is impossible that a God who is love itself and wisdom itself would give impossible commandments.

== Hinduism ==
As Hinduism is primarily a conglomerate of different religious traditions, there is no one accepted view on the concept of free will. Within the predominant schools of Hindu philosophy there are two main opinions. The Advaita (monistic) schools generally believe in a fate-based approach, and the Dvaita (dualistic) schools are proponents for the theory of free will. The different schools' understandings are based upon their conceptions of the nature of the supreme Being (see Brahman, Paramatma and Ishvara) and how the individual Self (atma or jiva) dictates, or is dictated by karma within the illusory existence of maya.

In both Dvaita and Advaita schools, and also in the many other traditions within Hinduism, there is a strong belief in destiny and that both the past and future are known, or viewable, by certain saints or mystics as well as by the supreme being (Ishvara) in traditions where Ishvara is worshipped as an all-knowing being. In the Bhagavad Gita, the Avatar, Krishna says to Arjuna:

- I know everything that has happened in the past, all that is happening in the present, and all things that are yet to come.

However, this belief in destiny is not necessarily believed to rule out the existence of free will, as in some cases both free will and destiny are believed to exist simultaneously.

The Bhagavad Gita also states:

Nor does the Supreme Lord assume anyone's sinful or pious activities (Bhagavad Gita 5.15)
From wherever the mind wanders due to its flickering and unsteady nature, one must certainly withdraw it and bring it back under the control of the self (Bhagavad Gita 6.26), indicating that God does not control anyone's will, and that it is possible to control the mind.

=== Different approaches ===
The six orthodox (astika) schools of thought in Hindu philosophy give differing opinions: In the Samkhya, for instance, matter is without any freedom, and Self lacks any ability to control the unfolding of matter. The only real freedom (kaivalya) consists in realizing the ultimate separateness of matter and self. For the Yoga school, only Ishvara is truly free, and its freedom is also distinct from all feelings, thoughts, actions, or wills, and is thus not at all a freedom of will. The metaphysics of the Nyaya and Vaisheshika schools strongly suggest a belief in determinism, but do not seem to make explicit claims about determinism or free will.

A quotation from Swami Vivekananda, a Vedantist, offers an example of the worry about free will in the Hindu tradition.

Therefore, we see at once that there cannot be any such thing as free-will; the very words are a contradiction, because will is what we know, and everything that we know is within our universe, and everything within our universe is moulded by conditions of time, space and causality. ... To acquire freedom we have to get beyond the limitations of this universe; it cannot be found here.

On the other hand, Mimamsa, Vedanta, and the more theistic versions of Hinduism such as Shaivism and Vaishnavism have often emphasized the importance of free will. For example, in the Bhagavad Gita the living beings (jivas) are described as being of a higher nature who have the freedom to exploit the inferior material nature (prakrti):

Besides these, O mighty-armed Arjuna, there is another, superior energy of Mine, which comprises the living entities who are exploiting the resources of this material, inferior nature.

Within Vedanta, Madhvacharya argues that souls do not have any free will as Lord Vishnu prescribes all their actions.

The doctrine of Karma in Hinduism requires both that we pay for our actions in the past, and that our actions in the present be free enough to allow us to deserve the future reward or punishment that we will receive for our present actions. The Advaitin philosopher Chandrashekhara Bharati Swaminah puts it this way:

Fate is past karma, free-will is present karma. Both are really one, that is, karma, though they may differ in the matter of time. There can be no conflict when they are really one. Fate, as I told you, is the resultant of the past exercise of your free-will. By exercising your free-will in the past, you brought on the resultant fate. By exercising your free-will in the present, I want you to wipe out your past record if it hurts you, or to add to it if you find it enjoyable. In any case, whether for acquiring more happiness or for reducing misery, you have to exercise your free-will in the present.

== Islam ==
Disputes about free will in Islam began with the Mu'tazili vs Hanbali disputes, with the Mu'tazili arguing that humans had qadar, the capacity to do right or wrong, and thus deserved the reward or punishment they received, whereas Hanbali insisted on God's jabr, or total power and initiative in managing all events. Schools that developed around earlier thinkers such as Abu Hanifa and al-Ash'ari searched for ways to explain how both human qadar and divine jabr could be asserted at the same time. Ash'ari develops a "dual agency" or "acquisition" account of free will in which every human action has two distinct agents. God creates the possibility of a human action with his divine jabr, but then the human follows through and "acquires" the act, making it theirs and taking responsibility for it using their human qadar.

== Judaism ==
The belief in free will (Hebrew: בחירה חופשית, romanized: bechirah chofshit, lit. 'free choice') is axiomatic in Jewish theology and closely linked with the concept of reward and punishment, which is in turn rooted in the Torah. Deuteronomy 30:19 exemplifies the communal and individual choices God gives the Israelites regarding his worship in the Land of Israel and mitzvot: "I [God] have put before you life and death, blessing and curse. Choose life—if you and your offspring would live". Free will is discussed at length in Jewish philosophy—firstly as regards God's purpose in creation, and secondly as regards the closely related resultant paradox. The topic is also often discussed in connection with negative theology, divine simplicity, and divine providence, as well as the more specific Jewish principles of faith.

=== Free will and creation ===
According to the Mishnah, "This world is like a vestibule before the World to Come". According to an 18th-century rabbinic work, "Man was created for the sole purpose of rejoicing in God, and deriving pleasure from the splendor of His Presence... The place where this joy may truly be derived is the World to Come, which was expressly created to provide for it; but the path to the object of our desires is this world..." Free will is thus required by God's justice, "otherwise, Man would not be given or denied good for actions over which he had no control".

It is further understood that for humankind to have true free choice, it must have inner free will and an environment in which a choice between obedience and disobedience exists. God thus created the world such that both good and evil can operate freely; this is the meaning of the rabbinic maxim, "All is in the hands of Heaven except the fear of Heaven".

According to Maimonides,

Free will is granted to every man. If he desires to incline towards the good way and be righteous, he has the power to do so; and if he desires to incline towards the unrighteous way and be a wicked man, he also has the power to do so. Give no place in your minds to that which is asserted by many of the ignorant: namely that the Holy One, blessed be He, decrees that a man from his birth should be either righteous or wicked. Since the power of doing good or evil is in our own hands, and since all the wicked deeds which we have committed have been committed with our full consciousness, it befits us to turn in penitence and to forsake our evil deed.

=== The paradox of free will ===
In rabbinic literature, there is much discussion as to the apparent contradiction between God's omniscience and free will. The representative view is that "Everything is foreseen; yet free will is given" (Pirkei Avot 3:15). Based on this understanding, the problem is formally described as a paradox, beyond human comprehension.

The Holy One, Blessed Be He, knows everything that will happen before it has happened. So does He know whether a particular person will be righteous or wicked, or not? If He does know, then it will be impossible for that person not to be righteous. If He knows that he will be righteous but that it is possible for him to be wicked, then He does not know everything that He has created. ...[T]he Holy One, Blessed Be He, does not have any temperaments and is outside such realms, unlike people, whose selves and temperaments are two separate things. God and His temperaments are one, and God's existence is beyond the comprehension of Man... [Thus] we do not have the capabilities to comprehend how the Holy One, Blessed Be He, knows all creations and events. [Nevertheless] know without doubt that people do what they want without the Holy One, Blessed Be He, forcing or decreeing upon them to do so... It has been said because of this that a man is judged according to all his actions.

The paradox is explained, but not resolved, by observing that God exists outside of time, and therefore, his knowledge of the future is exactly the same as his knowledge of the past and present. Just as his knowledge of the past does not interfere with man's free will, neither does his knowledge of the future. This distinction, between foreknowledge and predestination, is in fact discussed by Abraham ibn Daud.

One analogy here is that of time travel. Having returned from the future, the time traveler knows in advance what x will do, but while he knows what x will do, that knowledge does not cause x to do so: x had free will, even while the time traveler had foreknowledge. One objection raised against this analogy – and ibn Daud's distinction – is that if x truly has free will, he may choose to act otherwise when the event in question comes to pass, and therefore the time traveller (or God) merely has knowledge of a possible event: even having seen the event, there is no way to know with certainty what x will do; see the view of Gersonides below. Further, the presence of the time traveller may have had some chaotic effect on x's circumstances and choice, absent when the event comes to pass in the present.)

In line with this, the teaching from Pirkei Avot quoted above, can be read as: "Everything is observed (while - and no matter where - it happens), and (since the actor is unaware of being observed) free will is given".

=== Alternate approaches ===
Although the above discussion of the paradox represents the majority rabbinic view, several major thinkers resolved the issue by explicitly "excluding" human action from divine foreknowledge.

- Both Saadia Gaon and Judah ha-Levi hold that "the decisions of man precede God's knowledge".
- Rashi at the beginning of Sotah (Talmud) (page 2a d.h. Aini) comments "How could the Divine decree concerning a future marriage be based on the person's merit or wickedness? Before he is formed, when his future marriage is decreed, his wickedness or merit is not known. If you will ask that everything is known to Him, we are taught that 'All is in the power of God except for the fear of God.' This is as it says in tractate Niddah (Talmud), that the angel appointed over pregnancy brings the droplet and presents it before God, and asks 'What shall be the fate of this droplet? Shall it be strong or weak, wise or foolish, wealthy or poor?' But he does not ask if it shall be righteous or wicked, for this is not in the power of God."
- Gersonides holds that God knows, beforehand, the choices open to each individual, but does not know which choice the individual, in his freedom, will make.
- Isaiah Horowitz takes the view that God cannot know which moral choices people will make, but that, nevertheless, this does not impair his perfection; it is as if one's actions cause one of the many possibilities that existed then to have become known, but only once chosen.

Rabbi Mordechai Yosef Leiner holds perhaps the most controversial view: apparently denying that man has free will, and that instead all is determined by God.

=== Kabbalistic thought ===
The existence of free will, and the paradox above (as addressed by either approach), is closely linked to the concept of Tzimtzum. Tzimtzum entails the idea that God "constricted" his infinite essence, to allow for the existence of a "conceptual space" in which a finite, independent world could exist. This "constriction" made free will possible, and hence the potential to earn the World to Come.

Further, according to the first approach, it is understood that the Free-will Omniscience paradox provides a temporal parallel to the paradox inherent within Tzimtzum. In granting free will, God has somehow "constricted" his foreknowledge to allow for Man's independent action; He thus has foreknowledge, yet free will exists. In the case of Tzimtzum, God has "constricted" his essence to allow for Man's independent existence; He is thus immanent and yet transcendent.

== See also ==
- De libero arbitrio voluntatis – early treatise about freedom of will by Augustine of Hippo
- Karma
- Theodicy and the Bible#Bible and free will theodicy
