= Theological determinism =

Form of predeterminism

Theological determinism is a form of predeterminism which states that all events that happen are pre-ordained, or predestined to happen, by one or more divine beings, or that they are destined to occur given the divine beings' omniscience. Theological determinism exists in a number of religions, including Jainism, Judaism, Christianity, and Islam. It is also supported by proponents of Classical pantheism such as the Stoics and by philosophers such as Baruch Spinoza.

== Categorization of theological determinism ==
Two forms of theological determinism exist, here referenced as strong and weak theological determinism.

- Strong theological determinism is based on the concept of a creator deity dictating all events in history: "everything that happens has been predestined to happen by an omniscient, omnipotent divinity".
- Weak theological determinism, is based on the concept of divine foreknowledge – "because God's omniscience is perfect, what God knows about the future will inevitably happen, which means, consequently, that the future is already fixed". This form is affirmed by Jainism and vigorously defended by the Kanji sect of Jainism which requires belief in it as a necessary condition and first step for liberation. They often quote Einstein to support their thesis: "Events do not happen. They already exist and are seen on the Time Machine". This form also allows for a multiplicity of gods, as there is no contradiction in achieving omniscience by multiple entities.

There exist slight variations on the above categorization. Some claim that theological determinism requires predestination of all events and outcomes by the divinity (i.e. they do not classify the weaker version as 'theological determinism' unless libertarian free will is assumed to be denied as a consequence), or that the weaker version does not constitute 'theological determinism' at all. Theological determinism can also be seen as a form of causal determinism, in which the antecedent conditions are the nature and will of God. With respect to free will and the classification of theological compatibilism/incompatibilism below, "theological determinism is the thesis that God exists and has infallible knowledge of all true propositions including propositions about our future actions", a more minimal criteria designed to encapsulate all forms of theological determinism.

== Free will and theological determinism ==
A simplified taxonomy of philosophical positions regarding free will and theological determinism

There are various implications for metaphysical libertarian free will as consequent of theological determinism and its philosophical interpretation.

- Strong theological determinism is not compatible with metaphysical libertarian free will, and is a form of hard theological determinism (equivalent to theological fatalism below). It claims that free will does not exist, and God has absolute control over a person's actions. Hard theological determinism is similar in implication to hard determinism, although it does not invalidate compatibilist free will. Hard theological determinism is a form of theological incompatibilism (see figure, top left).
- Weak theological determinism is either compatible or incompatible with metaphysical libertarian free will depending upon one's philosophical interpretation of omniscience – and as such is interpreted as either a form of hard theological determinism (known as theological fatalism), or as soft theological determinism (terminology used for clarity only). Soft theological determinism claims that humans (or all organisms as per Jainism, because, otherwise they will never evolve out of their primary existence in the absence of a creator or director of the universe as per an argument similar to free will theorem) have free will to choose their actions, holding that God, whilst knowing their actions before they happen, does not affect the outcome. The belief is that their God's providence is "compatible" with voluntary choice. Soft theological determinism is known as theological compatibilism (see figure, top right). This view is held by Jainism.

A rejection of theological determinism (or divine foreknowledge) is classified as theological incompatibilism also (see figure, bottom), and is relevant to a more general discussion of free will.

The basic argument for theological fatalism in the case of weak theological determinism is as follows;

1. Assume divine foreknowledge or omniscience
2. Infallible foreknowledge implies destiny (it is known for certain what one will do)
3. Destiny eliminates alternate possibility (one cannot do otherwise)
4. Assert incompatibility with metaphysical libertarian free will

This argument is often accepted as a basis for theological incompatibilism: denying either libertarian free will or divine foreknowledge (omniscience) and therefore theological determinism. On the other hand, theological compatibilism must attempt to find problems with it. The formal version of the argument rests on a number of premises, many of which have received some degree of contention. Theological compatibilist responses have included;

- Deny the truth value of future contingents, as proposed for example by Aristotle (although this denies foreknowledge and, therefore, theological determinism).
- Assert differences in non-temporal knowledge (space-time independence), an approach taken for example by Boethius, Thomas Aquinas, and C. S. Lewis.
- Deny the Principle of Alternate Possibilities: "If you cannot do otherwise when you do an act, you do not act freely". For example, a human observer could in principle have a machine that could detect what will happen in the future, but the existence of this machine or their use of it has no influence on the outcomes of events.

== History ==
Many Christians have opposed the view that humans do not have free will. While Saint Thomas Aquinas, the medieval Roman Catholic theologian, believed strongly that humanity had free will, his writings ultimately ended up espousing what today would be known as compatibilism, or "soft determinism." The Jesuits were among the leading opponents of this view, because they held that divine grace was actual, in the sense that grace is among other things participative, and that humans could freely benefit from grace by a mediation between their own imperfect wills and the infinite mercy of God.

=== Martin Luther and Desiderius Erasmus ===
The concept of theological determinism has its origins within the Bible as well as within Christianity. In the sixteenth century, at the start of the Protestant Reformation, a major theological dispute erupted between influential theologians Desiderius Erasmus and Martin Luther. Erasmus, as he exposed in Discourses On the Freedom of the Will, believed that God created human beings with free will. He maintained that despite the fall of Adam and Eve freedom still existed. As a result of this humans had the ability to do good or evil. Luther, conversely, attacked this idea in On the Bondage of the Will. He recognised that the issue of autonomy lay at the heart of religious dissension. He depicted an image of humanity manipulated through sin. Humans, for Luther, know what is morally right but are unable to attain it. He claimed that humans thus must give up aspiring to do good in their fallen state and by their own power, as only by this could salvation be formed. This is reflected in the reformation doctrine of Sola Fide, that asserts that salvation is by faith alone and not achieved by meritorious good works. Luther also believed that the fall of Adam and Eve as written in the Bible supported this notion.

== See also ==
- Argument from free will
- Determinism
- Calvinism
- Jansenism
- Predestination
- Free will
- Theological fatalism
- Occasionalism
- Ajivika
