= Faith in Christianity =

In Christianity, faith is often discussed in terms of trusting in God and in God’s promises and divine will as laid out in the Holy Bible. Christian faith greatly centers around the life, ministry, passion, death and resurrection of Jesus Christ and his redemption of humanity as described in the New Testament, with most Christian traditions and denominations requiring belief in the resurrection of Jesus and in the Agony in the Garden. Many Christian denominations believe that a New Covenant was ushered in by Jesus during the Last Supper and that it changed or clarified the nature of faith. Some denominations believe that salvation is attained through faith and good works, while other denominations believe that salvation is attained through faith alone (sola fide) in Christ's atonement for humanity. In a disagreement closely related to Christology, certain (generally trinitarian) denominations require the belief that Jesus is God the Son who was incarnated as a man, while other (generally nontrinitarian) denominations simply require acknowledgment that Jesus is the Messiah or the Christ.

Since the Protestant Reformation of the 16th century, the meaning of the term faith has been an object of major theological disagreement in Western Christianity. The differences have been largely overcome in the Joint Declaration on the Doctrine of Justification (1999). The precise understanding of the term "faith" differs among the various Christian traditions. Despite these differences, Christians generally agree that faith in Jesus lies at the core of the Christian tradition, and that such faith is required in order to be a Christian. Some definitions of faith in the history of Christian theology have followed the biblical formulation in Hebrews 11:1: "Now faith is the assurance of things hoped for, the conviction of things not seen".

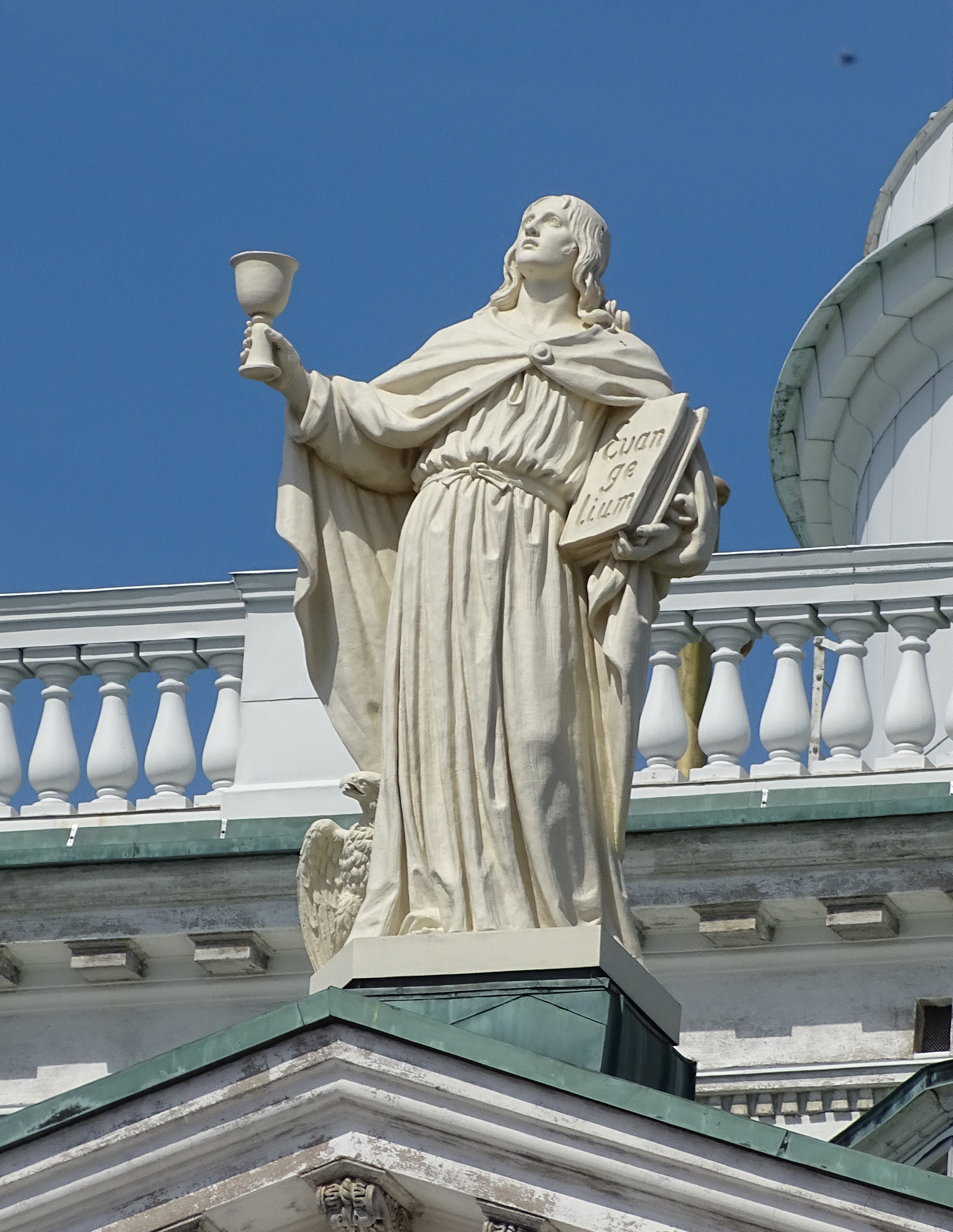
A statue of John the Evangelist at Helsinki Cathedral

Christian faith builds on Old Testament faith because the promises of the Old Testament are generally accepted as being fulfilled in the ministry, suffering, death, and resurrection of Jesus Christ.

== New Testament ==
The word "faith", translated from the Greek πίστις (pi'stis), was primarily used in the New Testament with the Greek perfect tense and translates as a noun-verb hybrid; which is not adequately conveyed by the English noun. The verb form of pi'stis is pisteuo, which is often translated into English versions of the New Testament as 'believe'. The adjectival form, pistos, is almost always translated as 'faithful'. The New Testament writers, following the translators of the Septuagint (Greek Old Testament) rendered words in the Hebrew scriptures that concerned 'faithfulness' using pi'stis-group words. The pi'stis-group words are most appropriately translated into English by a range of words, depending on the context in which they occur. In both the New Testament and other Greek texts, pi'stis describes connections of firmness that can form between a wide variety of entities: people, traditions, practices, groups, purposes, facts or propositions. The appropriate English translation is often evident from the relationship between the two entities connected by pi'stis. The pi'stis-group words in the New Testament can thus be interpreted as relating to ideas of faithfulness, fidelity, loyalty, commitment, trust, belief, and proof. The most appropriate interpretation and translation of pi'stis-group words in the New Testament is a matter of recent controversy, particularly over the meaning of pi'stis when it is directed towards Jesus.

=== Specific verses ===
Now faith (pi'stis) is the assurance of things hoped for, the conviction of things not seen.

— Hebrews 11:1

This passage concerning the function of faith in relation to the covenant of God is often used as a definition of faith. Υποστασις (hy-po'sta-sis), translated "assurance" here, commonly appears in ancient papyrus business documents, conveying the idea that a covenant is an exchange of assurances which guarantees the future transfer of possessions described in the contract. In view of this, James Hope Moulton and George Milligan suggest the rendering: "Faith is the title deed of things hoped for".

In recent decades, scholars have researched what pi'stis meant in the social context of the New Testament writers. Several scholars who have studied the usage of pi'stis in both early Greek manuscripts and the New Testament have concluded that 'faithfulness' is the most satisfactory English translation in many instances. This recent research has prompted some to argue that New Testament faith and belief in Jesus should be understood in terms of faithfulness, loyalty, and commitment to him and his teachings, rather than in terms of belief, trust and reliance.

== Catholic Church ==
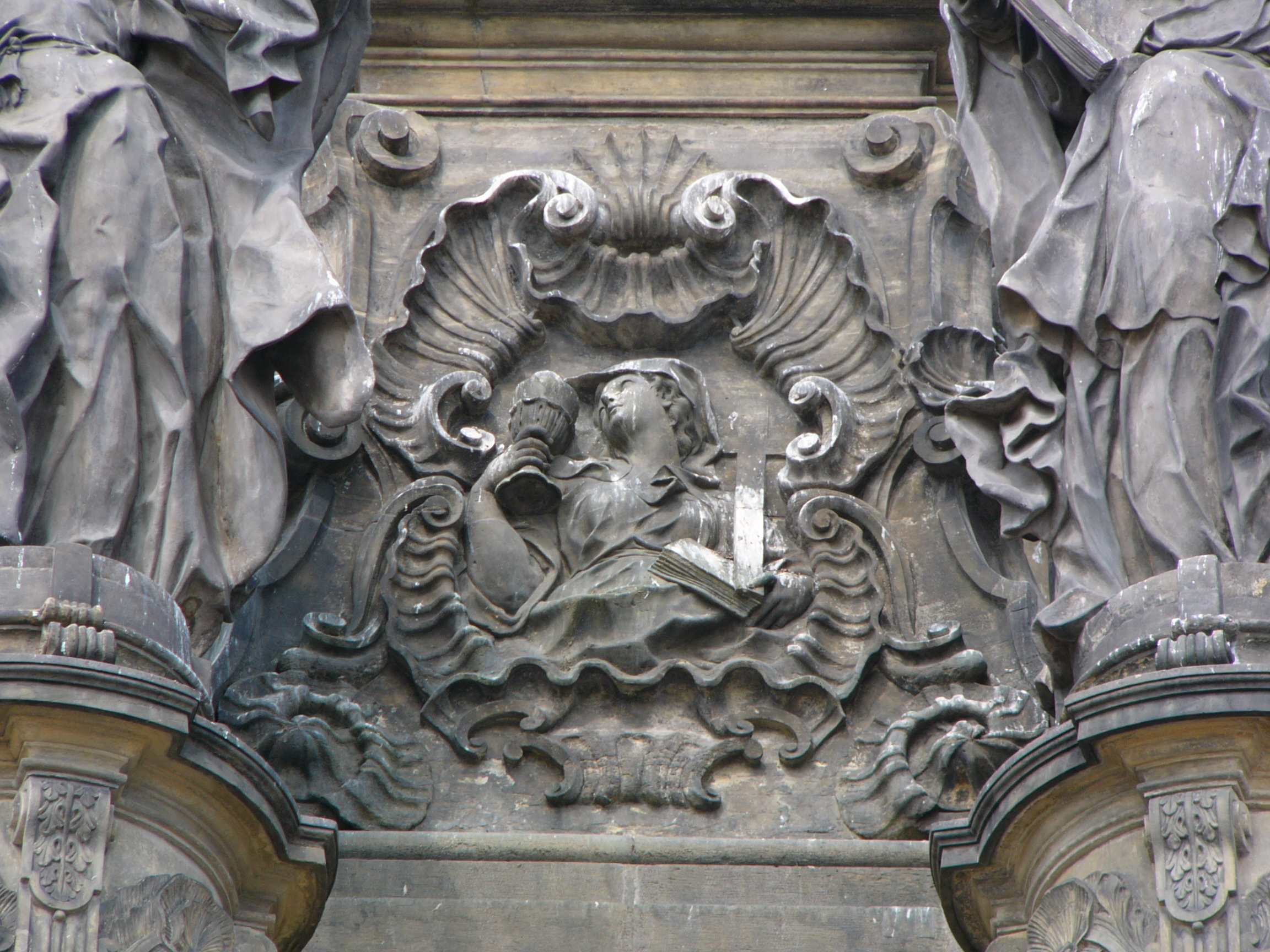
Relief of allegory of faith on the Holy Trinity Column in Olomouc

The Catholic Church considers that faith is twofold.

- Objectively, faith is the sum of truths revealed by God in Scripture and tradition and which the Catholic Church presents in a brief form in its creeds.
- Subjectively, faith stands for the habit or virtue by which these truths are assented to.

Assent to divine revelation on the basis of God's truthfulness is termed "divine faith"; this is distinguished from "human faith," which is the simple assent to the propositions of other human beings.

=== Faith as a theological virtue ===
According to Thomas Aquinas, faith is "the act of the intellect assenting to a Divine truth owing to the movement of the will, which is itself moved by the grace of God" (St. Thomas, II-II, Q. iv, a. 2). And just as the light of faith is a gift supernaturally bestowed upon the understanding, so also this divine grace moving the will is, as its name implies, an equally supernatural and an absolutely gratuitous gift.

=== Faith is not blind ===
"We believe", says the Vatican Council (III, iii), "that revelation is true, not indeed because the intrinsic truth of the mysteries is clearly seen by the natural light of reason, but because of the authority of God Who reveals them, for He can neither deceive nor be deceived." The Vatican Council says, "in addition to the internal assistance of His Holy Spirit, it has pleased God to give us certain external proofs of His revelation, viz. certain Divine facts, especially miracles and prophecies, for since these latter clearly manifest God's omnipotence and infinite knowledge, they afford most certain proofs of His revelation and are suited to the capacity of all." Hence Thomas Aquinas writes: "A man would not believe unless he saw the things he had to believe, either by the evidence of miracles or of something similar" (II-II:1:4, ad 1).

In the Catholic Church, justification is granted by God from baptism, the sacrament of faith. Cardinal Joseph Tobin said, "religion is a lifestyle. It means that what I believe influences the way that I live."

=== Minimal content ===
According to saint Thomas Aquinas, the Nicene Creed is the minimum content of faith necessary for salvation. It is necessary to believe in the Incarnation, Passion and Resurrection of Christ, which is only possible through faith in the human and divine nature of Jesus and thus in the Trinity.

The Christological mystery and the Trinitarian mystery are the foundations of the Christian faith. This is the obligation of every baptised believer, which allows them to attain a new life. According to Thomas, these elements of the faith do not require any other previous knowledge to be understood and believed; on the contrary, they are accessible to simple people and, thanks to the feasts of the liturgical year, are revealed to all.

== Eastern Christianity ==
=== Noetic faculty ===
Faith (pistis) in Eastern Christianity is an activity of the nous or spirit. Faith being characteristic of the noesis or noetic experience of the spirit. Faith here being defined as intuitive truth meaning as a gift from God, faith is one of God's uncreated energies (Grace too is another of God's uncreated energies and gifts). The God in Trinity is uncreated or incomprehensible in nature, being or essence. Therefore, in Eastern Christianity, God's essence or incomprehensibility is distinguished from his uncreated energies. This is clarified in the Essence-Energies distinction of Gregory Palamas.

=== Intuitive truth ===
As God in Trinity, as the anomalies of God's essence or being. In Eastern Christianity it is by faith or intuitive truth that this component of an object's existence is grasped.

== Protestantism ==
In the Protestant tradition, faith is generally understood to be closely associated with ideas of belief, trust, and reliance. This understanding is founded in the doctrinal statements of the Protestant Reformers. One of their confessional statements explains: "the principle acts of saving faith are accepting, receiving, and resting upon Christ alone for justification, sanctification, and eternal life." The Reformers contrasted faith with human efforts to do good works as a means of justification. This understanding of saving faith has remained within the Protestant tradition. Saving faith is generally understood in terms of a belief of, trust in, and reliance on the person of Jesus and his work of atonement accomplished through his death on the cross.

According to Lutherans, saving faith is the knowledge of, acceptance of, and trust in the promise of the Gospel.

=== Faith as steadfastness in reasoned belief ===
C.S. Lewis described his experience of faith in his book Mere Christianity by distinguishing between two usages of the word. He describes the first as follows: "Faith seems to be used by Christians in two senses or on two levels ... In the first sense it means simply Belief." Several paragraphs later he continues with "Faith, in the sense in which I am here using the word, is the art of holding on to things your reason has once accepted, in spite of your changing moods."

=== Faith as a gift of God ===
Paul writes in Ephesians 2:8–9: "For by grace you have been saved through faith, and this is not your own doing; it is the gift of God—not the result of works, so that no one may boast." From this, some Protestants believe that faith itself is given as a gift of God (e.g. the Westminster Confession of Faith), although this interpretation is disputed by others who believe the Greek gender alignment indicates that the "gift" referred to is salvation rather than faith.

== Latter Day Saint movement ==
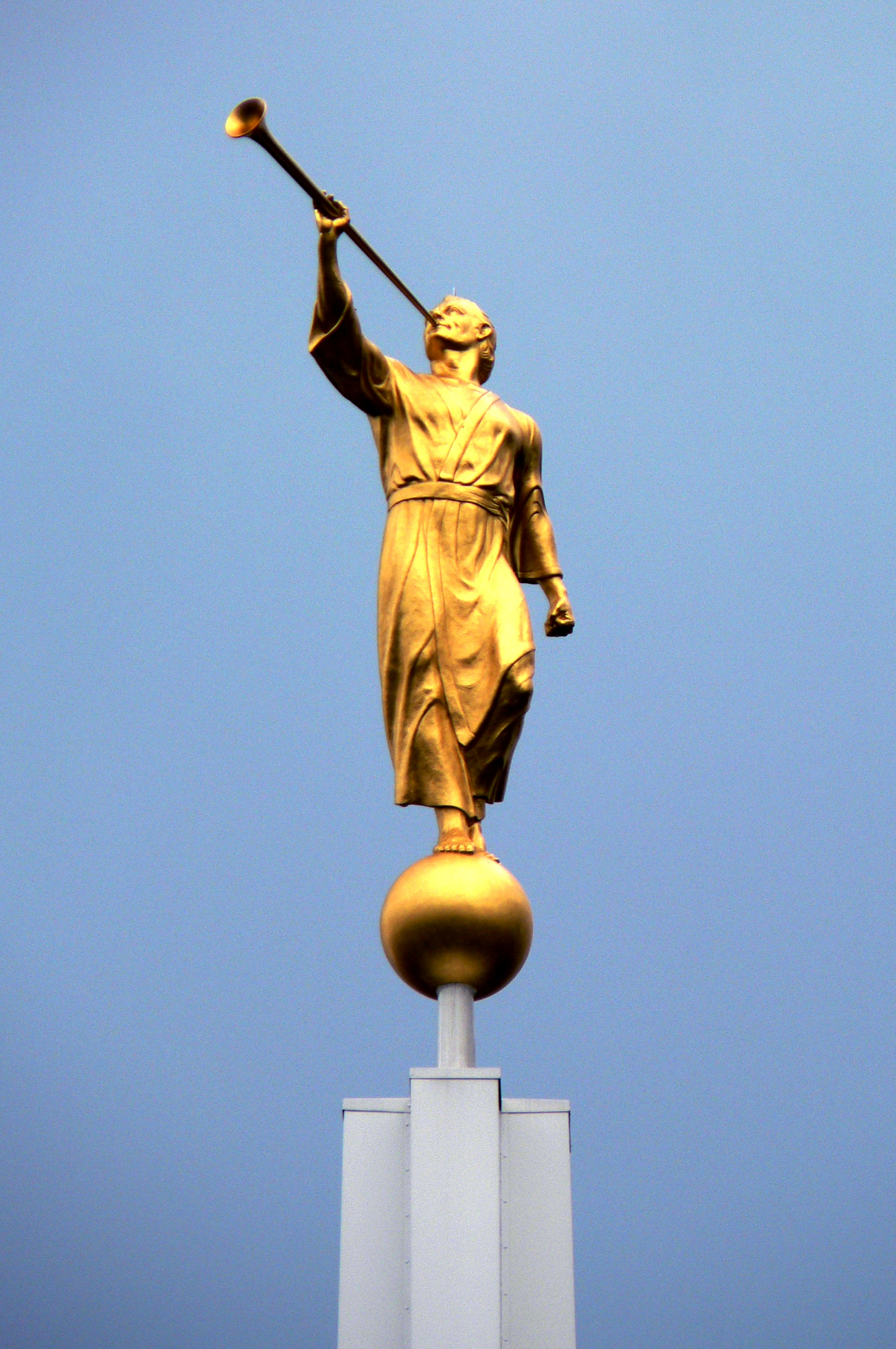
"And now, I, Moroni, would speak somewhat concerning these things; I would show unto the world that faith is things which are hoped for and not seen; wherefore, dispute not because ye see not, for ye receive no witness until after the trial of your faith." The Book of Mormon, Ether 12:6

=== Increase ones faith ===
James O. Mason said that there need to be 4 steps to increase ones faith.

- Study: The Prophet Joseph Smith instructed, “Faith comes by hearing the word of God, through the testimony of the servants of God.”
- Prayer: The Apostle Paul counseled that through our prayers we "might perfect that which is lacking in [our] faith." 1 Thessalonians 3:10
- Service and sacrifice: The Prophet Joseph Smith taught, "Let us here observe, that a religion that does not require the sacrifice of all things never has power sufficient to produce the faith necessary unto life and salvation; for, from the first existence of man, the faith necessary unto the enjoyment of life and salvation never could be obtained without the sacrifice of all earthly things."
- Personal righteousness: The Savior taught, "If any man will do [God's] will, he shall know of the doctrine, whether it be of God, or whether I speak of myself." John 7:17

=== Faith as a seed ===
Alma the Younger describes faith as a seed in Alma 32 in the Book of Mormon. This is the most comprehensive explanation of faith in the Standard works of the LDS Church.

== See also ==
- Binding of Isaac
- Book of Job
- Rule of Faith
