= Predestination in Protestantism =

Predestination in Protestantism is an interpretation in Protestant denominations of the doctrine that God has chosen certain individuals for salvation. Predestination should not be confused with providence, which pertains to God's ordinances regarding all things in general. Predestination is a highly controversial issue, with opinions varying significantly among the main branches of Protestantism. The main perspectives on predestination were formulated in the early centuries of Christianity, during the polemics between Augustine and Pelagius in the early 5th century. The issues related to predestination have been addressed in the works of major theologians, including Martin Luther, John Calvin, and Jacobus Arminius. Among modern interpretations, the original treatment of the issue by Karl Barth stands out.

The doctrine of predestination is a complex theological discipline, within which specific issues are distinguished, such as providence or God's foreknowledge, election, the logical order of God's decrees, and others. From a practical perspective, it aims to explain the observed fact that some people believe in God and, consequently, will be saved, while others will not. In general, the doctrine asserts that God, before the beginning of time, determined which individuals are worthy of salvation. As a consequence, all actions performed by a person have no influence on whether they will be saved or damned. Typically, the doctrine is considered alongside teachings on free will, grace, and salvation, which are central concepts in Protestant theology. There are significant differences in their understanding both between Protestantism as a whole and Catholicism, as well as among various branches of Protestantism. The doctrine of predestination exists in numerous variants, which are divided into three types. For Semi-Pelagianism and certain forms of nominalism, the concept of divine foreknowledge as the basis for predestination is characteristic—it is assumed that God predestines salvation for those whose future merits and faith He foresees. The main directions of Protestantism reject the significance of human merits in the matter of salvation, that is, synergism. In the doctrine of double predestination, which traces back to Aurelius Augustine and is associated in Protestantism with the name of John Calvin, it is asserted that God eternally predestines some to salvation and others to damnation. According to the third approach, also originating with Augustine and later developed by Thomas Aquinas, salvation occurs through grace that is not conditioned by merits and is predestined, although condemnation to damnation occurs due to a person's own sins and their free will. In Arminianism, predestination is rejected, and it is believed that a person achieves salvation through their own free choice.

In Lutheranism and Calvinism, the issues of free will and predestination to salvation or sin are considered from different perspectives. In Lutheranism, it is linked to the problem of the origin and persistence of evil: how can an omnipotent God be holy and righteous despite the existence of sin in the world He created, and the answer is sought within the paradigm of Law and Gospel. Importantly, punishment does not serve the purposes of the Gospel — in this sense, the position of Martin Luther is often called "admonitory" and fully subordinate to logic. In Reformed theology, the issue was considered similarly but to a greater extent in the context of absolute divine sovereignty.

The idea of predestination has deeply permeated the collective consciousness of Protestant countries. According to Max Weber, the sense of uncertainty it caused led to the emergence of the "Protestant work ethic". In the Kingdom of England, the Puritans, who advocated for the purity of Calvinism, were supported by the English monarchs James VI and I (1603–1625) and Charles I of England (1625–1649), and thus the debate had political significance and is considered one of the prerequisites for the English Revolution.

== Historical development ==
=== Formulation of the issue in early Christian theology ===
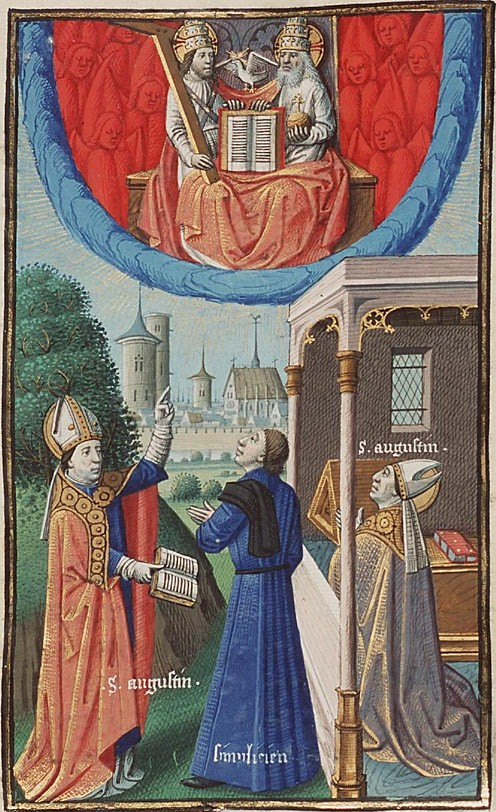
Saints Simplicianus and Augustine

The notion that God predestined the lives of all people was characteristic of most Jewish and Christian groups in the 1st century. In Judaism, election is a fundamental category denoting the relationship between Yahweh and the people of Israel, and the idea of predestination was largely associated with the political fate of the Jewish people. Each of the three main Jewish sects, the Pharisees, Sadducees, and Essenes, had its own perspective on this issue. The foundational influence on the development of the Christian doctrine of predestination came from the epistles of Paul the Apostle, particularly chapters 9–11 of his Epistle to the Romans. The relevance of the issue during that period was tied to attempts to explain how the chosen status of the people of Israel could coexist with the fact that many of them refused to recognize Christ. Certain passages from the epistle allow for an interpretation in the spirit of the possibility of universal salvation, but there is no consensus on this in Protestant theology. For example, regarding the words "all Israel will be saved" (Rom 11:26), the modern American scholar of the New Testament Douglas J. Moo points out that the apostle does not say that "every Israelite" will be saved. Similarly, the Anglican theologian Nicholas Thomas Wright emphasizes that neither Paul nor other New Testament authors are determinists who believe in some "blind" plan that renders human freedom a fiction. The Calvinist Karl Barth considers it indisputable that the concept of divine purpose (πρόθεσις) used in Rom 8:28, Rom 9:11, Eph 1:11 refers to divine election for salvation, but not to non-election or rejection, although these are implied as existing alongside this election.

The teaching of the Greek Fathers of the Church regarding predestination and grace is generally unified. Its main features, which include the defense of free will, divine justice, and the understanding of Christian life as participation in the divine plan, were formed during the struggle of early Christian apologists against pagan fatalism and astrology. A principal opponent of determinism was Origen (d. ca. 254). Origen's views can only be partially reconstructed, as his commentaries on the Epistle to the Romans and much of his treatise On the First Principles have not been fully preserved. Postulating that there is no cause for diversity within God Himself, Origen concludes that all rational creatures were created equal, and thus diversity arises from individual movements of the soul. Accordingly, the happiness or unhappiness of each is not accidental, and Divine providence is just. Commenting on Rom 11:26, Origen states that purification will last for many centuries, but ultimately all people will be saved and come to the truth. There are no reasons for any rational being to be excluded from salvation. In the 4th century, Gregory of Nyssa developed an original doctrine of free will. Building on the Old Testament principle of human likeness to God, Gregory constructed his anthropology on the assertion of the "royalty" of "human constitution". The primary way in which humans are like God is freedom, for "if any necessity prevailed over human life, the image would be false in this respect, becoming distant from the Prototype due to this dissimilarity". Moreover, for Gregory, the possession of free will is not merely one aspect of human royalty but the very characteristic that constitutes the essence of godlikeness. Free will is good in itself, as it is only through it that virtue can be achieved. How, then, does the soul choose evil? Undoubtedly, God cannot be the cause of evil, and Gregory, following Neoplatonists, associates evil with non-being. It arises in humans through their free will when they separate themselves from eternal perfection. The reason for the inclination toward evil lies in the fact that, due to their mutability, humans can change, and not necessarily for the better. Besides pagans, proponents of the doctrine of the inevitability of evil included Gnostics, for whom determinism reached extremes, and God became a slave to necessity. During the Reformation, Albert Pighius accused John Calvin of being unable to find support for his views in the theology of the early church. Agreeing with this assessment, Calvin noted the lack of a clear position on the issue of free will in the works of the Greek Fathers.

The issue of predestination was repeatedly addressed by Aurelius Augustine (d. 430). His doctrine of grace was of defining significance for the Protestant Reformation. Commenting on the Apostle Paul between 394 and 395 ("Expositio quarundam propositionum ex epistola ad Romanos"), Augustine placed great importance on human merits as the basis for predestination and the reason for the manifestation of Divine justice. Thus, at this stage, the approach of the Bishop of Hippo was based on the idea of God's foreknowledge of acts of faith, which in turn are the cause of good deeds. Augustine proposes the following sequence: God directs His grace (vocatio) to all sinful humanity; those who, by their free will, heed His call receive the Holy Spirit and gain the ability to perform good deeds; those who persevere will attain eternity. In this scheme, human free will, although significantly limited by the divine, becomes the basis for merits. Symmetrically, predestination to damnation was explained in a similar manner. A few years later, Augustine revisited the issue of predestination, responding to questions from Bishop Simplicianus of Milan, who struggled to interpret well-known Old Testament stories: why did God hate Esau, and how is the hardening of Pharaoh's heart compatible with free will? In Quaestiones ad Simplicianum, Augustine completely changed his initial position, and now faith could no longer be the basis for merits, as it itself is one of the gifts of the Holy Spirit. The symmetry of the previous approach is disrupted, and if foreknowledge of good deeds is no longer required for predestination, predestination to damnation is justified by original sin. With his responses, Augustine laid the foundation for an influential theological position in the West, linking the concepts of predestination and justification.

The dispute between Augustine and the British monk Pelagius was of defining significance for the further development of the doctrine. Having moved to Rome around 400 and being shocked by the prevailing debauchery in the imperial capital, Pelagius saw the cause of the moral decline of Christians in the church's teaching on original sin. In his view, people are naturally inclined to good but inevitably begin to sin if taught about their inherent sinfulness. Pelagius asserted that a person sins and achieves salvation by their free will, guided by the example of others. For Pelagius and his followers, it logically followed that grace is not necessary for salvation or the redemption of original sin. During the dispute, Pelagius agreed to acknowledge the existence of grace in secondary causes—for example, he considered free will, revelation, moral law, the example of Jesus Christ, and the like as grace. Augustine, on the contrary, believed that after the Fall of man, human will is entirely under the power of sin, and any positive change, including salvation, requires grace. According to Augustine, from all humanity, God chose some whom He predestined for salvation and endowed with irresistible grace; the reasons for this election are known only to God, do not depend on merits, and the decision to grant salvation is made by God before the beginning of time. Predestination is not conditioned by the foreknowledge of the merits of the elect; rather, their merits are possible because of predestination. Predestination and foreknowledge in Augustine are inseparable, in the sense that one does not precede the other, but distinguishable, as God does not accomplish everything He knows. In his formulation, the predestination of the saints is "the foreknowledge and preparation of God's benefits, by which those who are liberated are most certainly liberated". Pelagianism was condemned at the Council of Carthage in 418. Nevertheless, Augustine's teaching, which severed the connection between human actions and their subsequent fate, provoked objections. Vincent of Lérins (first half of the 5th century) and John Cassian (d. ca. 435) pointed out that the concept of predestination implied that God is the source of evil, that God cannot be called good if He predestined someone to perdition, and that predestination renders repentance and righteous living useless. According to Cassian, a person is capable of rejecting or accepting evil thoughts and thus bears responsibility for their thoughts. The beginning of salvation is a divine call, when God, noticing a person's desire to do good, strengthens this aspiration and promotes its development. Cassian's position was also not fully accepted by the church, and in further polemics, his viewpoint was both supported (e.g., by Faustus of Riez, who taught that a person's fate depends on their actions, and grace has a cooperative effect in turning toward good) and completely rejected (e.g., by Fulgentius of Ruspe, who adhered to Augustine's teaching). At the Council of Arles in 475, the teaching of Lucidus, according to which God seeks to save not all people but only some, was condemned. The dispute, known as the Semipelagian, concluded at the Council of Orange in 529, which affirmed a "moderate" form of Augustinianism and left the issue of predestination unresolved.

The Eastern Fathers of the Church did not accept Augustine's teaching, considering it more appropriate to speak of God's providence. The Orthodox understanding of providence was most consistently expressed in the 8th century by John of Damascus. In his "exact Exposition of the Orthodox Faith", he defines it as "the care that God exercises toward what exists. Providence is the will of God, by which all that exists is governed in a purposeful manner". Everything that God knows and wills, according to Damascus, is directed toward good, whereas "He neither wills vicious deeds nor truly evil things in advance or afterward, but permits free will". Damascus distinguishes between predestination, which is something that has already occurred, and God's providence, which expresses His activity. God is not the direct cause of all good deeds, much less of evil ones: "He does not will that vice occur, but He does not compel to virtue by force. Therefore, predestination is the work of divine command combined with foreknowledge". The commission of evil deeds occurs when a person is in a state of "abandonment by God", of which there are two types: pedagogical and complete. Complete abandonment occurs when God has exhausted all means for a person's salvation, signifying total perdition.

=== Development of the doctrine in the Middle Ages ===
If the Semipelagian controversy centered on Christian anthropology and the doctrine of the Fall, these issues were later taken as given and no longer debated. In the 9th-century dispute, the central focus shifted to the examination of divine attributes in their relation to predestination and the clear connection between a person's actions and their future life. Opponents of the teaching of Gottschalk of Orbais on double predestination included the archbishops Hincmar of Reims and Rabanus Maurus. Gottschalk's works have not been fully preserved, but it can be asserted that his theology was based on the idea of immutable divine sovereignty determining the fate of people, angels, and demons. For Gottschalk, predestination to perdition is based on divine foreknowledge of evil deeds and is enacted before the beginning of time. The words of the Apostle Paul in 1Tim 2:4 ("who desires all people to be saved and to come to the knowledge of the truth"), according to Gottschalk, should not be taken literally, as otherwise, they would imply divine omnipotence over the condemned. Accordingly, the Lord shed His blood only for the elect. In his writings on predestination, Rabanus Maurus expressed concern that Gottschalk's teaching severed the direct connection between a person's actions and their fate, which was evident not only to him but also to ordinary believers who heard Gottschalk's preaching. In the 840s, Gottschalk's views were condemned by two local councils, his writings were burned, and he remained in confinement until the end of his life. In 851, at Hincmar's request, the Irish theologian John Scotus Eriugena wrote a refutation of Gottschalk's views. Drawing on the works of Augustine, Eriugena substantiates the thesis that predestination is a characteristic of God, not something pertaining to His creations, and therefore cannot be regarded as a mechanism for compelling people to one behavior or another. God endowed people with free will, over which predestination cannot prevail. With the help of grace, free will is inclined toward good, while sinners use their will for evil. Evil, being the absence of good, is not substantial, i.e., accidental, so God neither knows nor predestines it. Thus, Eriugena distinguishes two sources of spiritual development that act together—however, God participates only in good deeds. As a result, predestination applies only to the righteous. Eriugena proposes understanding the difference between predestination and foreknowledge metaphorically, taking into account the incomprehensibility of these subjects and the imprecision of language. Eriugena's interpretation did not resolve the issue, and in 855, he and his work were condemned at the Council of Valence. The dispute was finally settled with the adoption at the Council of Tusey of a formula proposed by Hincmar, according to which God desires to save all who will be saved and were predestined.

Anselm of Canterbury (1033–1099) and Peter Lombard (1095–1160) deepened the distinction between predestination to salvation and damnation. Both portrayed God's involvement in predestination to evil as a more passive action, consisting of preparing judgment for sinners, but not directing them toward vice. Lombard is also credited with defining reprobation as non-election. In the 13th century, Thomas Aquinas (d. 1274), continuing this trend, formulated a doctrine on the cause of predestination that became foundational in Catholicism. In his famous Summa Theologiae, Aquinas constructs his reasoning by distinguishing between potential and actual for creatures and postulating God the Creator as infinite actuality. God is good, in the most excellent way, and wholly simple. By creating phenomena and objects, God imparts to them His being and goodness. God has a will and desire to communicate His good to other things, and this desire is necessary. God's knowledge, combined with His will, is the cause of things, from which the concept of providence arises, i.e., the ordering of things toward a purpose. Developing the thesis on providence, Aquinas states that "just as in every craftsman there preexist the types of things made by his art, so in every ruler there must preexist the type of order of those things that are to be accomplished by the subjects of his governance". Accordingly, God is also the cause of sin, but only as an act and being. Sin itself is a deficient being and act, and its deficiency stems from a created cause, namely human free will. God does not will evil but does not prevent it. At the same time, the theologian describes that God helps some people avoid sin, and in this sense, He loves some people more than others. The words of the Apostle Paul that God "desires all people to be saved" (1Tim 2:4) are interpreted by Aquinas in three ways: in the spirit of Augustine, that God desires all people to be saved not in the sense that there is no one whose salvation He does not desire, but that no one is saved unless He wills their salvation; as the possibility of salvation for representatives of different groups of people (men and women, Jews and Gentiles, etc.); in the spirit of John of Damascus, as pertaining to God's initial but not subsequent will. God initially desires all people to be saved, but subsequently, due to His righteousness, He condemns some. Human merits play no role in salvation and cannot be considered a cause of predestination. The predestined will inevitably be saved, as this is the order of providence, but some contingencies are possible due to the action of proximate causes.

By the 14th century, two approaches to understanding predestination had emerged: the Dominican, following the paradigm of Thomas Aquinas, emphasizing the significance of divine reason, i.e., knowledge of who will be saved, and the voluntarist Franciscan, where the main authority was Bonaventure (d. 1274). In the mid-14th century, the English Franciscan William of Ockham (d. 1347) reached unexpected conclusions while exploring the idea of God's absolute power. For Ockham and his followers, it seemed possible that God, through His absolute power, without the involvement of secondary causes (grace), could, for example, save a sinner or condemn a righteous person, and that a person, solely by their free will, could perform praiseworthy acts and achieve salvation without the intervention of grace. As a result, in the second half of the 14th century, certain aspects of Ockham's teaching were condemned as a form of Pelagian heresy. In the first half of the 16th century, already in response to the development of the Reformation, the Council of Trent formulated a doctrine in which grace is necessary for salvation and active, but a person must cooperate with it and accept it.

== In early Protestantism ==
=== In Lutheranism ===
==== Martin Luther's views formation ====
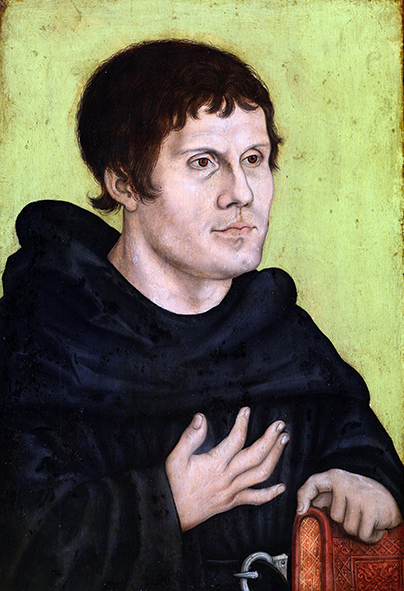
Martin Luther in Augustinian attire but without a tonsure, painting by the Lutheran Lucas Cranach the Elder (c. 1522)

According to a widely accepted view, the doctrine of Martin Luther (1483–1546) on free will and predestination did not undergo significant changes since his studies under the Augustinian Johann von Staupitz (d. 1524). Staupitz authored several books on predestination, in which he defended the doctrine of election and pure grace. In the early stages of his education, Luther, by his own admission, relied solely on the Bible and the works of Augustine. Around 1510, he delved into the issue and began leaning toward the Occamist position that predestination is based on divine foreknowledge of human behavior. However, Luther later returned to a strict Augustinian dogma—according to the German church historian Heinrich Böhmer, this shift occurred after reading The City of God. Luther was convinced of his own predestination to damnation, and Staupitz advised him to avoid pondering matters that God preferred to keep hidden. Years later, Luther repeated this advice to those facing similar spiritual struggles.

Luther's doctrine of predestination was not systematically articulated, even though it remained a significant theme in several of his works. In his lectures on Romans, delivered in 1515–1516, he expressed fundamental agreement with the doctrine of predestination as formulated in Augustine's later works. (Note: These lectures were not widely known until 1908, when they were first published, so earlier studies on Luther's view of predestination are significantly incomplete.) According to Luther, while salvation involves human will, it does not originate from it but solely from the mercy granted by God according to His will. God elects only some from eternity out of all humanity. Luther considered the verse Rom 8:28 —"And we know that in all things God works for the good of those who love him, who have been called according to his purpose"— to be of utmost importance for understanding this issue, finding in it a "comforting" promise of salvation, in contrast to the pagan concept of fortune. Luther explains the apparent injustice of the fate of the non-elect by referencing the words of the Apostle Paul about the "hardening" of Pharaoh's heart (Rom 9:17–18), who refused to grant freedom to the Jews. In Luther's interpretation, "those whom God hardens are precisely those whom He allows to remain in sin and wickedness". Salvation lies entirely in God's will, but Luther warns against fatalism and falling into an abyss of terror and hopelessness, suggesting instead to contemplate the Christ's wounds.

Between 1516 and 1520, Luther participated in several disputations, defending the thesis that there is no free will without grace. In the theses presented at the Heidelberg Disputation of 1518, Luther argued that after the Fall, free will exists only in name and is capable only of leading to mortal sin. In 1520, he was excommunicated, and his doctrine of free will was condemned. That same year, Luther wrote a treatise in his defense, accusing Rome of Pelagianism. In 1522, Luther published the first German Bible. In the preface to the Epistle to the Romans, he revisited the theme of predestination, insisting that humanity is so weak that, if left to itself, no one would be saved, and the devil would triumph.

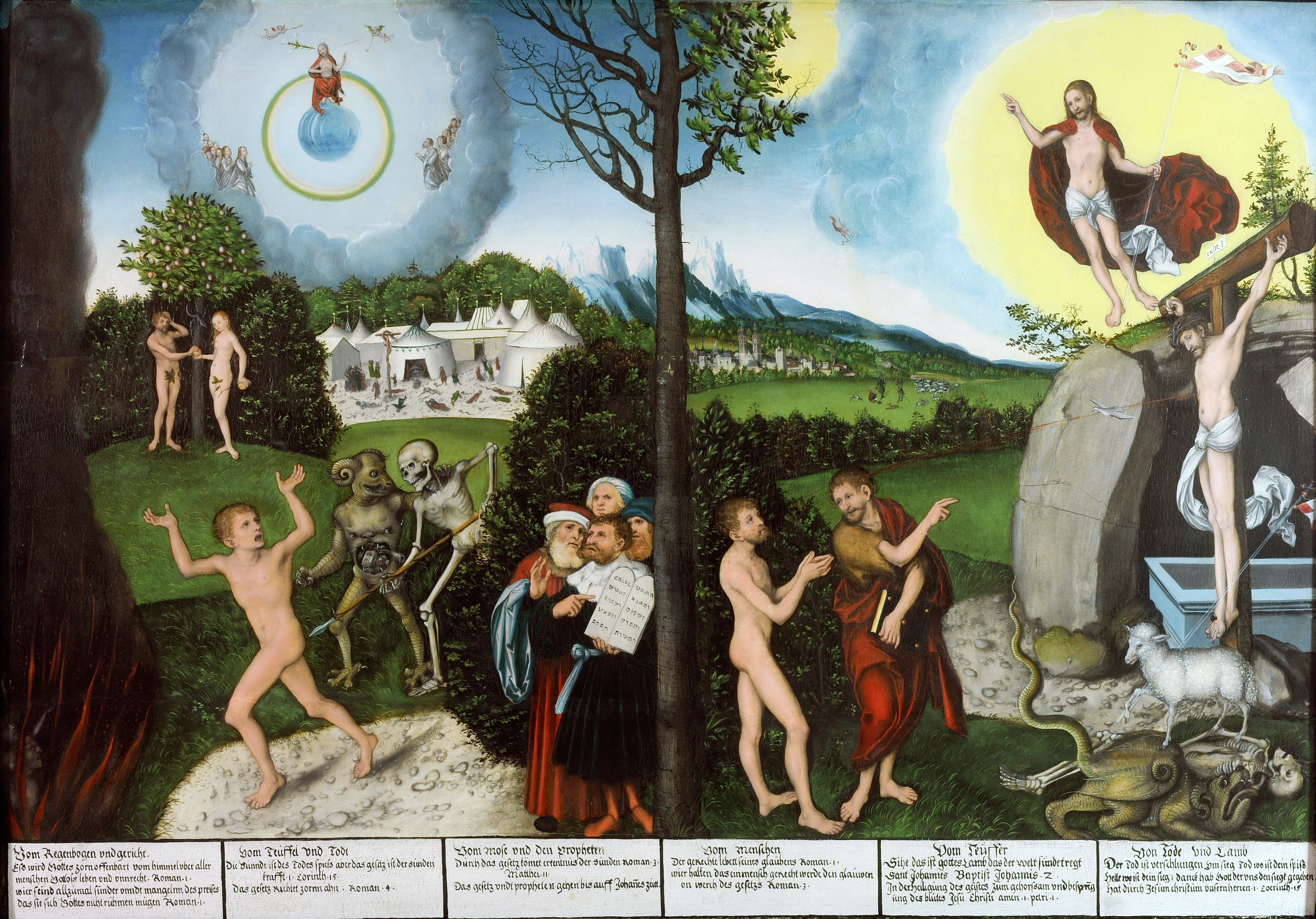
Law and Gospel, painting by the Lutheran Lucas Cranach the Elder (c. 1529)

Luther's views on predestination took their final form during his dispute with Erasmus of Rotterdam (1466–1536). In 1524, Erasmus published a treatise dedicated to critiquing Luther's doctrine of predestination, titled Of free will. Drawing on biblical material, he approached the issue from a moral perspective. (Note: It is known that Rome insisted that Erasmus turn his pen against Luther, but it is not entirely clear why this particular aspect was chosen as the target. It is possible that Luther's approach to predestination, which was off-putting at a lay level, seemed the most vulnerable to criticism.) For Luther, the issue of free choice touched the very essence of Scripture—the promises, glory, and grace of God—while for Erasmus, delving into the mechanics of grace and salvation, or hidden matters, was an act of irreverence. In Erasmus's view, Luther's approach reflected fatalism and antinomy and could have a destructive impact on people's behavior. Free will, Erasmus argues, is a knot that many have tried to unravel, and he believes Lorenzo Valla succeeded best. Erasmus defines freedom as a force that either directs or diverts a person from eternal salvation. He proposes a semi-Pelagian approach, based on the synergy of human will and divine initiative. The Dutch scholar distinguishes four levels of grace, starting with natural grace (gratia naturalis), which all possess without exception. This grace enables a person to participate in their salvation: "This, of course, means that it would not be untrue to say that a person does something, but everything they accomplish must be wholly attributed to God the Creator, by whose will it happens that a person can unite their effort with God's grace. ... The accomplishment is attributed to the architect, without whose help nothing would have been achieved, yet no one says that the worker and the apprentice did nothing. What the architect is to the apprentice, grace is to our will". For Erasmus, human participation in such a gradual process of perfection is more meaningful than Luther's concept of obedience. As a humanist, Erasmus considers Luther's view of original sin and fallen human nature, which allows only to love or hate God but not actively obey Him, to be exaggerated.

In his response, laid out in the treatise On the Bondage of the Will (1525), (Note: The title of the treatise is a quotation from Augustine.) Luther proceeds from diametrically opposed premises: "... if grace comes by divine will or predestination, it comes by necessity, not by our zeal or effort, as we have taught above. And if God promised grace before the law, as Paul stated in Galatians, then it comes not by works or the law—otherwise, the promise would be meaningless. Then faith would have no value if works matter". Luther denies that God is the source of sin and evil in people—if Pharaoh's heart is hardened, it is because God did not send His Spirit. Everything is determined by the will of the omnipotent God, and only His Spirit regenerates people and sustains them in a regenerated state. The initiative in this process belongs solely to God, though human cooperation is required. However, Luther emphasizes that this is not external coercion forcing a person to act against their will but a gentler guiding influence. Luther devotes some attention to reprobation, that is, God's rejection of those condemned to damnation. However, Luther's doctrine of predestination is ancillary to his soteriology and pertains primarily to those destined for salvation. Luther describes the human ability to understand divine predestination using the conceptual distinction between the revealed God (Latin: Deus revelatus) and the hidden God (Latin: Deus absconditus). These concepts do not indicate a duality in God's reality or will but relate only to the limits of human understanding. God's revealed will, expressed in Holy Scripture, sets the boundary for human understanding of divine predestination. Luther does not delve into justifying this fact, citing the hardening of Pharaoh and the stories of Jacob and Esau as illustrations. Salvation is found in the revealed Christ, but the reason some are rejected remains a mystery.

Due to the distinctive style of Luther's works, his love for paradoxes and unexpected assertions, his doctrine of predestination and free will sparked controversies even in the early period of Protestant history. In 1664, when publishing another edition of On the Bondage of the Will, the German Lutheran Sebastian Schmidt wrote a lengthy preface to demonstrate that Luther's work was not Calvinist. In the 20th century, the founder of Lutheran Confessional Church, Siegbert Becker, cautioned against hasty conclusions that, based on interpretations of individual quotes, could portray Luther as a follower of Barth or Butler.

==== Philipp Melanchthon and Protestant Scholasticism ====
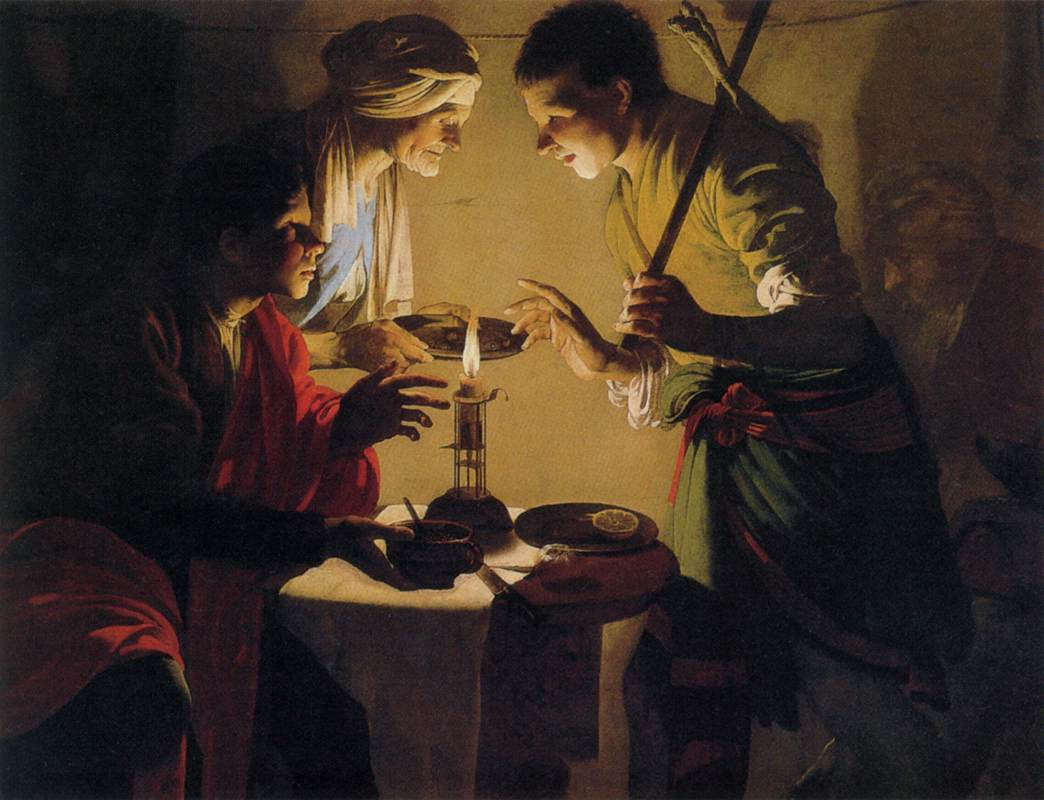
The story of Jacob and Esau is a classic illustration of predestination. Painting by Hendrick ter Brugghen, 1627

The further development of the doctrine of predestination in Lutheranism is associated with the name of Philipp Melanchthon (1497–1560). The modern Dutch theologian Gerrit Berkouwer calls his concept "synergistic," as it assumes a certain human participation in salvation, stemming from a person's own desire to believe or not believe. Consequently, Melanchthon's concept virtually lacks the idea of reprobation, which predetermined the exclusion of the doctrine of double predestination from later Lutheran orthodoxy. The 19th-century theologian Philip Schaff characterized this position as "an improved evangelical form of semi-Pelagianism, anticipating Arminianism". However, modern theologians (Hans Engelland, Timothy J. Wengert) argue that the differences between Luther and Melanchthon's views were not significant. As noted by the American historian Clyde Manschreck, Melanchthon's approach to free will underwent noticeable changes over time. In his youth, Melanchthon was under Luther's dominant influence, which is reflected in the first edition of Commonplaces (1521), where he speaks of complete divine control and predestination. Influenced by Luther's dispute with Erasmus on free will and leaning toward the latter's perspective, Melanchthon found it necessary to explain his and Luther's views within the framework of Aristotelian scholasticism. Taking into account the criticisms of Erasmus and Johann Cochlaeus regarding the "recasting" of Stoicism and Manichaeism, Melanchthon excluded predestination from subsequent editions of "Commonplaces" and does not mention it in the Augsburg Confession (1530). Indeed, as Manschreck notes, Melanchthon could not accept Stoic fatalism, which would imply limiting God by causal laws of nature and excluding miracles and efficacy of prayer. Melanchthon was also troubled by the absence of determinism in Scripture and the contradiction between predestination and the idea of universal salvation. If justification depends solely on God, human participation in receiving grace is no greater than that of a stone. In his works of the 1530s, Melanchthon refined his doctrine on the human role in salvation; starting with the 1535 edition of Commonplaces, it took a form close to its final version. God is not the cause of evil and does not desire it—the causes of evil lie in the devil (John 8:44) and human will. Based on the understanding that God cannot be the cause of evil, Melanchthon allows for contingency in human affairs. A person, guided by the Spirit and the Word, can adhere to the law, and free will can be recognized as a third cause of conversion. Citing ancient Church Fathers, Melanchthon describes free will as the ability to accept grace.

Justifying divine sovereignty in a way that excludes the possibility of calling God the source or enabler of sin, Melanchthon defines the limits of human free will as follows: it is sufficient to be the cause of evil deeds. God's sovereignty is manifested in setting the boundaries of possible evil. God does not act in the world as a "secondary cause" but is above them. To justify contingency in human actions and, consequently, the emergence of sin, Melanchthon employed the scholastic distinction, derived through Thomas Aquinas from Aristotle, between events determined by absolute necessity (necessitas consequenti) and those necessary under certain conditions (necessitas consequentia). This approach was rejected by Luther but accepted by Calvin and Reformed theologians. The Westminster Confession (1647) states: "God from all eternity, by the most wise and holy counsel of His will, freely and unchangeably ordained whatsoever comes to pass. Yet so, as thereby neither is God the author of sin, nor is violence offered to the will of the creatures, nor is the liberty or contingency of secondary causes taken away, but rather established". For Melanchthon, this distinction of causes does not place humans on the same level as God, as the desire for evil is not the creation of something new but merely a distortion of the divinely established order.

Some of Melanchthon's doctrinal positions were not accepted in later Protestant theology. Speaking of the causes that lead to a person's conversion to God and repentance, he names three: the Word of God, the Holy Spirit, and the human will submitting to them. The doctrine of three causes proved vulnerable to accusations of synergism, so Melanchthon's students and younger contemporaries, David Chytraeus and Martin Chemnitz, explicitly interpreted it in an Aristotelian sense: human will was called the material cause (causa materialis), a passive instrument of the Holy Spirit, which alone is the causa efficiens. Nevertheless, the potential for misinterpretation persisted, and after Melanchthon's death, Chytraeus and Chemnitz ceased using the doctrine of three causes.

==== Lutheran Orthodoxy's development ====
===== Strasbourg Dispute =====
Despite the differences between Luther and Melanchthon regarding predestination, this issue did not cause significant disputes between the main branches of early Lutheranism, the Philippists and Gnesio-Lutherans. In general, Luther's early followers shared his somewhat paradoxical theory of election—salvation of the elect was entirely the result of God's activity, while sinners bore full responsibility for their damnation. Instead, several conflicts involving Italian scholastics Peter Martyr Vermigli and Girolamo Zanchi became a significant milestone in formulating Lutheran dogma and further distinguishing it from Reformed theology. In their methodology, Zanchi and Vermigli followed the scholastic methods of Thomas Aquinas and studied predestination in terms of divine attributes. In their theology, predestination held a central position and served as the cause of Incarnation, Christ's life, and death. The Italians preached that grace is given not to all but only to a few elect. Later, through the efforts of Zanchi's student, Franciscus Gomarus, this view prevailed at the Synod of Dort. Vermigli's dissemination of grace by God is understood in terms of the scholastic doctrine of divine concurrence, which, in turn, develops Aristotle's teaching on act and potency. The works of Zanchi and Vermigli saw dozens of editions up to the 20th century and were used in polemics against Arminianism and Methodism. Vermigli, who wrote an extensive treatise on predestination around 1552, found an opponent in the Zurich theology professor Theodore Bibliander, whose views on grace were similar to those of Erasmus. With the support of city magistrates, Vermigli prevailed, after which his doctrine spread in the German-speaking part of the Swiss Confederation.

The dispute in Strasbourg arose after Martin Bucer, who had fled to England, was replaced as head of the city community by Johann Marbach. Marbach's "Lutheranization" of the city in the late 1550s led to a conflict with the Reformed theologian Girolamo Zanchi. The dispute, in which personal motives were closely intertwined with dogmatic disagreements, was driven by differences in methodology—Christological for Marbach and scholastic for Zanchi. Neither Marbach nor Zanchi denied election, but they differed on its interpretation. Zanchi preached that the elect cannot fall from grace. Marbach argued that if Zanchi's claims were accepted as true, it would imply that the divine promise of grace is not universal but applies only to those predestined by a secret decree. Marbach insisted that believers can find assurance of their personal salvation only in Christ, while Zanchi considered the syllogistic formula (syllogismus practicus) "there are signs of predestination; I possess these signs; therefore, I am predestined" to be correct and useful. Unlike Calvin, who provided no clear guidance on this matter, Zanchi lists numerous clear signs. He was likely the first Calvinist to formulate the "practical syllogism". In his polemic with Marbach, Zanchi outlined the main tenets of his theology, which include the following regarding predestination:

- God has determined both the number of those elected to eternal life and the number of those rejected;
- Neither can those elected to life lose their election and thus are necessarily saved, nor can those not predestined avoid damnation.

In Zanchi's interpretation, double predestination operates within the framework of effective free human will, and thus, a sinner's damnation results from their own sins committed without coercion from God—God permits sin but is not its author. Ultimately, Marbach prevailed, as formalized in the "Strasbourg Formula" of 1563 ("Strassbourg Concordia"), drafted with the participation of Jakob Andreae from Wittenberg, Simon Sulzer from Basel, and Kunnman Flinsbach from Zweibrücken. It stated that "God does not desire sin and does not create vessels of wrath for destruction; why some are saved and others are not cannot be determined; one should not be troubled by this question but entrust it solely to Christ".

===== Saxon disputes =====
Another significant polemic in the 1550s involved Saxon Lutherans in the aftermath of the Protestant defeat in the Schmalkaldic War. Several theologians refused to accept the Leipzig Interim of 1548, which concluded the war, due to its thesis on adiaphora, or non-essential church rites and customs that could facilitate interconfessional agreement. The adiaphora proposed by Melanchthon was supported by his student, theology professor at Leipzig University, Johann Pfeffinger, while Luther's prominent associate Nikolaus Amsdorf saw the agreement as submission to the Roman Antichrist. It is unsurprising, therefore, that Pfeffinger's 1555 theses on the role of human free will in conversion to salvation were met with objections from Amsdorf and his party. Pfeffinger argued that the reasons why some respond to the Gospel's call while others do not lie within people themselves, namely in their free will. A person, he wrote, is not like a stone in the sense that their reason is capable of making choices and moral decisions. Despite Pfeffinger's efforts to emphasize God's guiding role in salvation, the concept that a person decides whether to let the Holy Spirit into their life (liberum arbitrium in spiritualibus) provoked objections among Lutherans. Monergists Amsdorf and Matthias Flacius suspected it of undermining God's sole responsibility for a sinner's salvation. Viewing Pfeffinger's ideas as a return to the worst examples of medieval theology, they insisted that the Holy Spirit must guide the sinner's will before they can accept the promise of salvation. Agreeing with the stone analogy, Amsdorf attributed control over human psychological processes to either Satan or Christ. Amsdorf's own doctrine included five main points:

- Although burdened by sin, human will can submit to discipline and is capable of moral efforts;
- Sinners have neither the freedom nor the power to overcome their moral corruption;
- The Holy Spirit aids in the spiritual endeavors of the believer;
- Human will is not like a stone and participates in conversion;
- God is not the cause of sin and desires all to be saved (1Tim 2:4). However, human free will determines the extent to which the Holy Spirit influences them.

Amsdorf's treatises on double predestination did not gain widespread acceptance, and subsequent Lutheran theology took a different path, but his views were supported by court theologians of Duke Johann Friedrich II, Johann Stolz, and Flacius. Quoting Luther, Flacius argued that people are entirely passive, like a log, and thus do not participate in conversion from sin to faith in Christ. Moreover, people are worse than logs, as their will opposes God's until His work of conversion is complete. Pfeffinger's position was supported at the Weimar colloquium by another of Melanchthon's students, Victorin Strigel, who argued that free will was damaged and weakened but not entirely destroyed by original sin. The dispute between monergists and synergists ended with the condemnation of the latter.

In the late 1550s, the Saxon theologian Nicolaus Gallus criticized Melanchthon's doctrine of human will cooperating with the Holy Spirit as equivalent to denying Luther, aligning with Erasmus and early medieval semi-Pelagianism. Melanchthon, in turn, rejected Gallus's criticism as Stoic madness and stated that his opponent was as mistaken as Luther. Further polemics took place within the Jena University, where, under the patronage of Duke Johann Friedrich II, Lutheran theologians attempted to reach agreement on the growing number of contentious issues in Lutheranism. This approach found no support among Gnesio-Lutherans, and the duke sought to secure the condemnation of Melanchthon's position at the Colloquy of Worms in 1557. Equally heated were disputes over the Eucharist and the justification of sinners before God. The expression of Gnesio-Lutheran doctrine in opposition to the Philippists was the Weimar Book of Refutation (1559), compiled at the initiative of Flacius and Amsdorf. Among other things, it condemned Melanchthon's views on the role of free will in a sinner's conversion. Strigel refused to accept this document and was compelled to debate Flacius. Strigel attempted to express his understanding of the fallen state of the sinner in terms of Aristotelian physics, substance, and accident. During the debate, he argued that the will is substantial, as its removal would mean a person is no longer the same, whereas sinfulness lacks this property. Thus, salvation is more akin to healing the sick than resurrecting the dead. Flacius, also within the Aristotelian paradigm, argued that the Fall fundamentally changed human nature, transforming a God-like being into one resembling the devil. Accordingly, sinfulness must be understood as a substance. The death of the duke's son interrupted the debates, and subsequent events led to the loss of Gnesio-Lutheran influence at the Saxon court.

After their defeat in the 1560 debates, Flacius and his allies were expelled from Saxony. Seeking to end disputes over free will, Duke Johann Friedrich sought assistance from Duke Christoph of Württemberg, who sent his court theologians Jakob Andreae and Christoph Binder to Weimar. Together with Victorin, in May 1562, they agreed on the Declaration of Victorin as a new confessional document for Saxony. It affirmed that only God can lead sinners to salvation. Original sin was explained not as Adam and Eve's weakness, but as a lack of righteousness and holiness in their will and heart. With the Holy Spirit's help, a person can regain the ability (modus agendi) to make a free choice and thus accept the Gospel.

==== Formula of Concord ====
Growing disagreements among Lutheran theologians, coupled with the attention given to predestination in Calvinism, necessitated the development of a unified position. The result was the 11th article of the Formula of Concord, titled On God's Eternal Foreknowledge and Election, signed in 1577—"so that, by God's grace, disagreement and division on this matter among our followers may be prevented in the future". The text was authored by Martin Chemnitz (chapters 9–64) and Jakob Andreae (chapters 65–93), with significant contributions to the final text by David Chytraeus. One of the authors' goals was to formulate orthodoxy in a way distinct from Flacius's approach, eliminating the notion of original sin as a substance inherently present in the sinner. The Concordists believed that such Aristotelianism should not be presented to the common people, though such terminology was permissible for the learned. They rejected the Pelagian notion that sin does not affect the sinner's nature, but they also did not accept sin as an ineradicable substance.

In the introductory section (paragraphs 1–8 of the Epitome), basic definitions are provided. Foreknowledge or prescience (Latin: praescientia, praevisio) is defined as the property by which God sees and knows everything before it happens, while predestination is God's appointment to salvation. Foreknowledge is understood as knowledge of future events but not their cause. The same applies to evil, which is caused by the perverse, corrupt will of the devil and humans. Unlike foreknowledge, predestination pertains only to true believers and is the driving force of salvation. The text emphasizes that predestination should not be understood as a deterministic given but as a mysterious plan revealed through the Word. The authors of the Formula of Concord (Concordists) interpret the distinction between the hidden and revealed God differently from Luther. While Luther's distinction aims to prevent speculation beyond the boundaries set by Scripture, the Concordists exclude the hidden altogether from consideration. Thus, the doctrine of predestination is reduced to God's purpose in Christ Jesus, who is the true Book of Life, revealed to us through the Word. The Formula repeatedly emphasizes the universal nature of salvation and election, secured by Christ's taking on the sins of the world — and only by this; nothing in a person is the cause of election. The Concordists characterize their doctrine as "the most steadfast comfort to all who are troubled," a comforting doctrine that gives no one reason for despair (if they believe they are not elected) or for leading a licentious life (if they believe they are elected and nothing can harm them, or that they are not elected and their actions cannot worsen their state). Furthermore, where the preaching of predestination results not in comfort but in despair or false confidence, the doctrine is not presented in accordance with God's institution and will, but according to the judgment of blind human reason and the instigation and perversion of the devil.

The Concordists explicitly reject the doctrine of double predestination and reprobation — God's eternal election must be considered in Christ, and not outside or without Him, and only those who reject Him are rejected. The approach of the 11th article's authors was criticized as contradictory and led to numerous theological disputes. Nevertheless, by rejecting some of Luther's ideas, the Formula's adoption ended disputes among his followers. During the orthodox period, which lasted until the mid-18th century, (Note: The period of "Lutheran orthodoxy" is considered the time between the publication of the Formula of Concord and the deaths of the last major Lutheran theologians of the era, David Hollaz in 1713 and Valentin Ernst Löscher in 1749.) Lutheran theology developed along the lines set by the Formula of Concord. For most major theologians of the period, such as Johann Gerhard (1582–1637), exposing the errors of Calvinism remained a key task.

=== In Reformed theology ===
==== Calvin's doctrine ====
Typically, Calvinism and Reformed theology are considered closely associated with the doctrine of predestination. Modern researchers emphasize the distinction between Calvin's theology and that of his successors, though the essence and reason for this distinction are difficult to pinpoint. According to the prevailing view, Calvin's methodology, which distinguished him from the next generation of Reformed theologians, relied more heavily on Scripture and less on a central dogma. If one were to identify such a principle, according to Paul Jacobs, it would be the Trinitarian principle, linking predestination with soteriology, ensuring a Christ-centered causality of salvation. In historical perspective, in the concept of the Reformation by the Dutch historian Heiko Oberman, the significant role of predestination in the theology of John Calvin (1509–1564) is explained in the context of accompanying historical circumstances. Following the example of his compatriot Willem van't Spijker, who compared the doctrines of predestination in Calvin and Martin Bucer (1491–1551) and linked their differences to variations in life experiences, Oberman suggests that for Calvin, his "experience of exile" was defining. Geneva in the first half of the 16th century became a home for Protestants from many European countries, including Calvin, who fled from France. For them, predestination was a doctrine of comfort.

In the final edition of his main work, Institutes of the Christian Religion (1559), Calvin devoted chapters 21 to 24 of Book III to predestination. Before addressing election, Calvin first explains why this doctrine is complex and intricate. Nevertheless, some conclusions can be drawn from Scripture, and Calvin starts with the observable fact that the Word of God is not preached everywhere, and where it is preached, it is not equally effective. Can it be assumed that this is because Christ's preaching is so powerless that it cannot overcome the resistance of human will? Certainly not, Calvin concludes, the reason is that God "does not extend His arm to all". The premise for his reasoning is the observation that "in the fact that the covenant of life is not preached equally to all the world, and even where it is preached, it is not equally received by all, the wonderful mystery of God's judgment is revealed," resulting in two categories of people. The cause of this state of affairs is that salvation depends solely on election as an act of God's will before the world's beginning, determining who will receive salvation through Christ and who will be excluded from His effective work. Calvin then provides his definition of predestination: God's eternal decree (Latin: aeternum Dei decretum), by which He determined what He wills to do with each person. God does not create all people in the same condition but ordains some to eternal life and others to eternal damnation. Depending on the purpose for which a person was created, we say they are destined for either death or life. Essential elements of this definition include the reference to double predestination in the doctrine of salvation, (Note: Double predestination is absent in the first edition of the "Institutes" and appears only in the second edition of 1539.) its connection to soteriology, and its distinction from foreknowledge. Thus, God's eternal decree of predestination in Calvin's system is composite, encompassing election by grace, through which people are chosen for salvation, and the doctrine of reprobation, by which others are explicitly excluded from salvation. Calvin emphasizes that reprobation or rejection always accompanies election by grace. As he states in his Treatise on the Eternal Predestination of God, there is an "inseparable connection between election and reprobation." In the "Institutes," he also asserts that election would be meaningless without reprobation.

Unlike scholastics who considered predestination a particular case of providence, Calvin assigns providence a subordinate role in his system. The assertion that predestination to salvation and damnation are not logically linked decrees of God (i.e., that God first desires to save all humanity and then punishes with reprobation those who resist) but rather a single act aligns Calvin's position with the views of the 14th-century theologian Gregory of Rimini. Calvin also rejects a causal link between election and future human merits foreseen by God. These concepts are conceptually distinct: in foreknowledge, God knows what happens; in predestination, He determines what must happen. Foreknowledge does not make things necessary; it is based on the inevitability of an executed decision. Furthermore, if predestination were based on foreseen merits or faith, it would imply some degree of dependence of God's actions on humans, which is impossible. In chapter 23 of his work, Calvin justifies the doctrine of double predestination with the existence of a divine plan to punish the wicked. Finally, in chapter 24, he refutes the view that human efforts or faith are significant for achieving salvation.

In various editions of the Institutes, the order of presentation changed, but the volume of text steadily increased, and according to modern researcher Richard Muller, predestination can be considered the cornerstone of Calvin's soteriology. A significant factor is the placement of the section on predestination at the end of Book III, concluding the exposition of the doctrine of salvation. On the other hand, several of Calvin's treatises are specifically dedicated to predestination. Overall, whether predestination occupies a central place in Calvin's theological system is highly debated. While secular historiography often answers affirmatively (e.g., Franz Schnabel considers this self-evident), church historians tend to hold the opposite view.

==== In Calvin's disciples ====
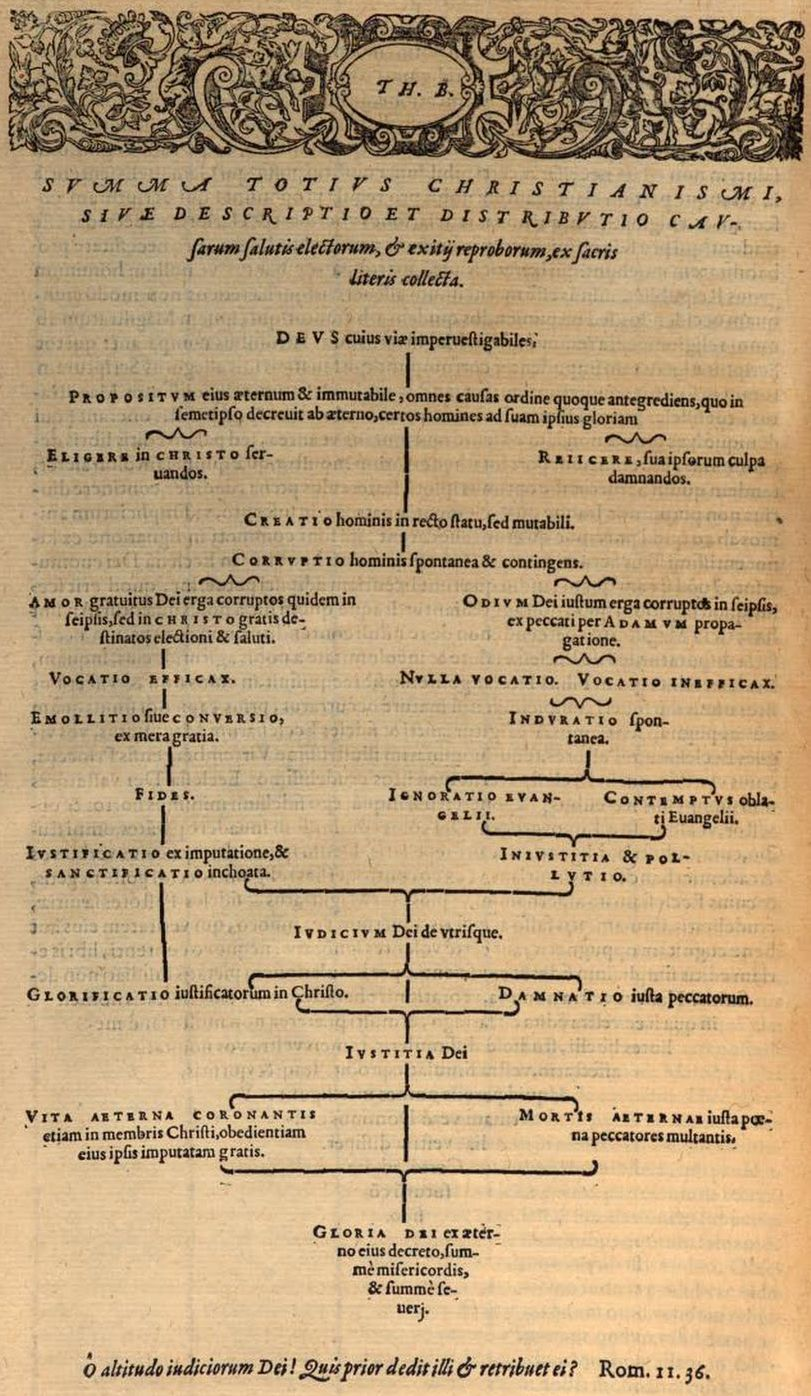
Tabula Predestinationis by Theodore Beza in the 1570 edition of his works.

It is generally considered that Calvin's closest disciples and followers had a greater influence on the development of the Reformed doctrine of predestination. Among them is the Italian theologian Peter Martyr Vermigli (1499–1562), who outlined his views in commentaries on the Romans written in the early 1550s. (Note: See more in Peter Martyr Vermigli#Predestination.) He begins his discussion by justifying the appropriateness of debating predestination. According to Vermigli, denying this doctrine leads to denying divine foreknowledge, and it is in predestination that the core tenets of Protestant doctrine —Sola fide and Soli Deo gloria— reach their culmination. Accepting predestination does not lead to despair but, on the contrary, teaches Christians to rely not on their weak strength but on God's unshakable covenants.

The Reformed orthodoxy on predestination was systematically and normatively articulated by Calvin's colleague Theodore Beza (1519–1605). For clarity, he created a diagram (Tabula praedestinationis), according to which humanity is divided into the elect and the reprobate. The first version of the diagram emerged in the early 1550s in response to criticism of Calvin's doctrine on the origin of human sins by the French theologian Jérôme Bolsec. Bolsec refused to acknowledge that divine election is the source of faith and argued that believers in Christ are elected regardless. Insisting on simple predestination and rejecting double predestination, Bolsec cited the authority of Heinrich Bullinger (1504–1575) and Melanchthon. In the dispute with Bolsec, Beza sided with Calvin and secured the support of the Reformed churches of Switzerland, while Bolsec was expelled from Geneva. In 1555, Beza published the first version of his diagram, in which predestination was called the sum of all Christianity (Latin: summa totius Christianismi). Beza most fully articulated his doctrine of predestination in "De praedestinationis doctrina"(1582) and in his commentaries on Romans. Beza's doctrine, described by researchers as rigidly theocentric, coldly deterministic, and strikingly scholastic, assumes that human reason can comprehend the mysteries of God's plan regarding predestination. It anticipates later "lapsarian" debates — in their terminology, Beza's doctrine aligns with supralapsarianism. Beza is also a proponent of double predestination, asserting that God eternally predestined the creation of two types of people: "vessels of honor" destined for salvation and "vessels of dishonor" rejected. It is necessary to distinguish between the decree of election or reprobation and its execution. The reason an individual falls into one category or another is unknowable but lies within the person themselves. In his scholastic analysis of the causes of reprobation, Beza divides them into necessary and contingent. In the case of election, secondary causes can be traced to the primary cause, the decree of election. In the execution of reprobation, secondary causes originate from the person, and the divine decree is fulfilled by allowing the person to act according to their will. Nevertheless, the execution of reprobation occurs under God's control, determining the manner of punishment. Beza provides no reliable criteria for individuals to classify themselves and agrees with Calvin that one cannot know of their reprobation. The sign of election is true faith, but one cannot confidently judge the authenticity of their faith. Such a doctrine can lead to despair, and nothing can be done about it, as Christ died only for the elect—this follows from the logical subordination of His atonement to the decree of election. This provides the basis for one of Calvinism's dogmas — limited atonement.

Beza's supralapsarianism became the foundation of Reformed orthodoxy, though even among his disciples, there was no consensus. Infralapsarianism was held by Lambert Daneau, who served as a professor in Geneva from 1574 to 1581, and Beza's students Franciscus Junius, who preached in Leiden, and Giovanni Diodati (1576–1646), who succeeded Beza's theological chair in Geneva. Unlike Beza, Diodati viewed God as observing an already fallen and corrupt humanity as a "mass," in which there is no distinction except that which God imparts through His free will.

=== In Anabaptism ===
Early Anabaptists were a highly diverse movement, but in general, they were characterized by a belief in the universal accessibility of grace and the possibility of unlimited growth in holiness. One of the leaders of German Anabaptists in the early 16th century, Hans Denck (d. 1527), believed that a person could truly resemble God in their behavior. God granted humans the ability to accept or reject His will, as all that is needed is sincere prayer, which would be impossible for a "stone". Since God does not concern Himself with individual differences, the opportunity and grace are given to all. Denck agrees with Erasmus that free will is always preserved but asserts that a person cannot even accept grace without grace. Addressing traditional themes in this area of theology, Denck understands the "hardening of the heart" as an opportunity for repentance and sees the story of Jacob and Esau as an example of divine foreknowledge. Denck was likely aware of the dispute between Erasmus and Luther, as was his contemporary Balthasar Hubmaier (1485–1528). Hubmaier distinguishes two aspects of the divine plan: the existence of God's omnipotent and hidden will, as well as His revealed will to bring all people to faith in Christ. The revealed will, in turn, is divided into two: an attractive and a repulsive will. Under the influence of the former, people turn to Christ, who died for all humanity, while due to the latter, they receive deserved punishment for choosing to reject God. Through another follower of Erasmus, Menno Simons (d. 1561), a liberal version of the doctrine of predestination took root in Holland.

Among later Anabaptists, the Dutchman Dirk Volkertszoon Coornhert (1522–1590) stands out for his fierce criticism of Calvinist dogmas on original sin, the bondage of the will, justification by faith alone, and predestination as blasphemy and incitement to immoral behavior. For Coornhert, people are inherently good, and to claim otherwise is to call God the source of evil. All deviations are products of society, which hinders avoidance of sin. Grace does not limit individual freedom, as otherwise, punishment or reward would not be deserved. Coornhert calls predestination a slander against God, unsupported by either Scripture or reason. Denying accusations of Pelagianism, the Dutch theologian claimed his doctrine was biblically grounded. For him, Christianity is important as a guide to life, and the true criterion of a genuine Christian is love for God and neighbor, not adherence to a set of dogmas. Human perfection and true grace are achievable, but only for a few.

== Disputes in the 17th Century ==
=== Arminianism ===
Criticism of the Calvinist doctrine of predestination in Dutch Protestant churches began long before Jacob Arminius (1560–1609). According to Herman Hoeksema, in his teaching, Arminius "combined heretical elements" of Hubert Duifhuis, Dirck Coornhert, Caspar Coolhaes, Adolf Venator, and others. The year after Arminius's death, his followers adopted a doctrinal document known as the Five Articles of Remonstrance. According to the first article of this document, "God, by an eternal and unchangeable purpose in Jesus Christ His Son, before the foundation of the world, determined to save in Christ, for Christ's sake, and through Christ, those from the fallen, sinful human race who, through the grace of the Holy Spirit, believe in His Son Jesus and persevere in this faith and obedience of faith, through His grace, to the end; and, on the other hand, to leave the incorrigible and unbelieving in sin and under wrath, and to condemn them as alien from Christ". This formulation asserted that the basis of predestination was the foreseen faith of a person. The second and fourth articles described grace as universal and potentially resistible, which also contradicted the Calvinist approach. According to the definition of modern Arminian theologian Roger E. Olson Arminianism is an evangelical synergism, in contrast to heretical or humanistic synergism, condemned as Semi-Pelagianism, and heretical monergism (Pelagianism). Thus, according to Olson, Arminianism implies the prevenient grace of a person directing their good will toward God, including non-resistance to salvation coming from Christ. In terms of differences with Calvinism, Arminianism denies unconditional election, which excludes the possibility of salvation for some people. Arminius did not accept the Calvinist distinction between God's decree for the occurrence of the Fall and His permission (non-prohibition) of it, considering it catastrophic from the perspective of God's goodness. In his polemic with the English Puritan William Perkins, Arminius wrote about the primacy of Christ's predestination as the Savior and mediator between God and humanity over all other acts of predestination. Arminius did not consider taking human behavior into account as a limitation of God's sovereignty but merely as an occasion for God's actions toward a person. Faith is given to a person as a gift that can be rejected. Unlike Arminius, many of his followers (Episcopius, Simon, Philipp van Limborch) rejected unconditional assurance of salvation or grace that prevents falling away.

The culmination of attempts by Reformed orthodox theologians, which began during Arminius's lifetime, to halt the spread of Arminianism was the convening of the Synod of Dort, which held sessions from November 1618 to May 1619. In addition to Dutch participants, delegations from several other Protestant countries took part in the synod's activities. The Arminians refused to recognize the authority of the synod and regarded it merely as a theological conference. Although they were eventually expelled from the sessions, they were allowed to present their views in writing. Alongside the Heidelberg Catechism of 1553 and the Belgic Confession of 1561, the Canons of Dort are one of the foundational doctrinal documents of the Dutch Protestant churches. The synod's definition of predestination is structured in such a way that reprobation, while not excluded, is not included as an independent truth in predestination.

=== "Lapsarian" disputes ===
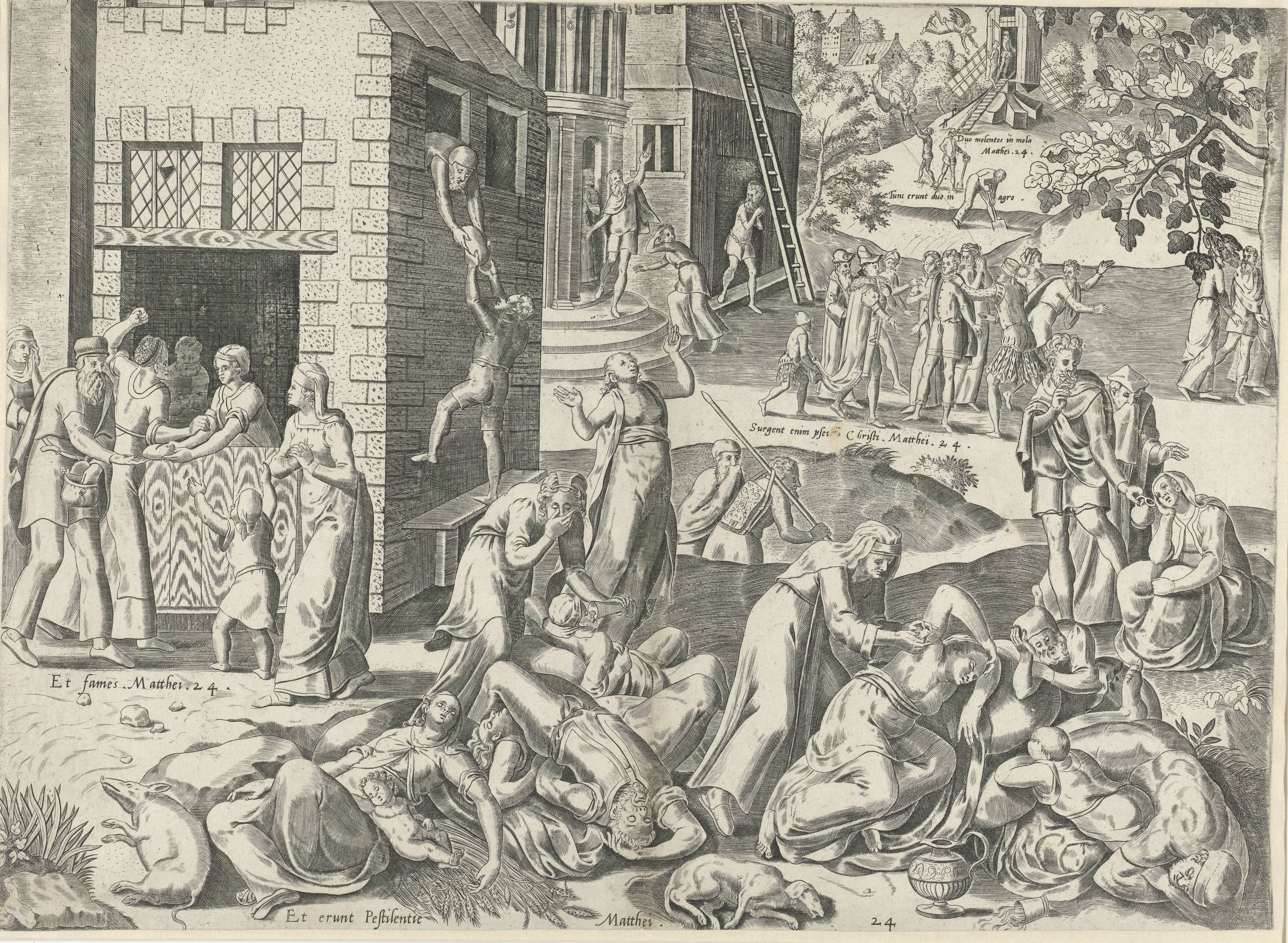
Dying sinners and righteous ones saved by angels during the Second Coming of Christ in an engraving by Franz Hogenberg

The question of the Logical order of God's decrees was raised in early Christianity but took on a fundamental character only during the Reformation era. Most early Reformers, including Luther, Zwingli, and Calvin, agreed that the Fall (Latin: lapsus) was predestined by God's active will. Heinrich Bullinger and several less prominent theologians only allowed for the possibility that God merely foresaw the Fall. Subsequently, a consensus emerged in Protestantism that Bullinger's approach did not adequately describe the relationship between God's decrees and the cause of sin's emergence. Nevertheless, within this consensus, further questions arose: Was reprobation based on God's simple desire, or was it a manifestation of divine justice necessitated by the occurrence of sin? Should election and reprobation be regarded equally as acts of pure Divine sovereignty, or is election a manifestation of grace while reprobation is of justice? In the course of disputes among Protestants, four main perspectives on the order of decrees were formulated: Arminian, Amyraldism, supra- and infralapsarianism, with the latter two closely tied to the Calvinist doctrine of reprobation.

The source of disagreements regarding the order of decrees lies in differing interpretations of one of the classic New Testament passages on predestination, Rom 9:21 ("Does not the potter have power over the clay, to make from the same lump one vessel for honorable use and another for dishonorable use?"), specifically whether "clay" (Ancient Greek: φυράματος) refers to fallen or unfallen humanity. Infralapsarians argue that predestination, from a moral perspective, must follow the decrees of creation and the Fall, while their opponents prioritize election. In their arguments, the parties emphasize different theological aspects: for supralapsarians, divine sovereignty is more significant, while infralapsarians believe that rejecting a person irrespective of their foreseen Fall and sin is incompatible with God's nature. The latter also assert that God's election is entirely an act of loving grace, in which God determined to save some people, already considered as created and fallen, while reprobation is merely the election of the saints and the refusal of salvation to others, who are left to condemnation and perdition. Thus, the decree of predestination follows (infra) the decree of the Fall. Supralapsarians, however, believe that God's decree of predestination must precede the decree of the Fall. They teach that predestination is entirely a pure, sovereign act of God's good pleasure, in which God elects or rejects individuals, contemplating them as created and capable of falling, but not yet fallen. Thus, predestination precedes (supra) the Fall. It should be emphasized that in both cases, the discussion concerns a moral, not chronological, order of decrees, as all are eternal.

The spectrum of "lapsarian" theories developed during the discussions of the Synod of Dort and included three possibilities: a person could be creabilis but labilis (supralapsarianism, not yet created but predestined to the Fall); creatus and labilis (created and predestined to the Fall); or creatus and lapsus (infralapsarianism, created and having already fallen). The Dutch professors participating in the synod, Johannes Polyander, Antonius Thysius the Elder, and Antonius Walaeus, presented an infralapsarian definition of predestination and reprobation, in which the object is "humanity fallen into sin and perdition". From their perspective, supralapsarianism eliminates the need for Christ's mediatory function and the salvation of unfallen humanity. The definition provided by the English delegation, while differing in other respects, was also infralapsarian. Among influential theologians, only Franciscus Gomarus expressed a supralapsarian position, and in the end, the synod's general opinion leaned toward his opponents. On the other hand, the synod's overall goal and that of most theologians was to avoid certain statements, Latin: phrases duriores. The case of the Polish theologian Johannes Maccovius, whose supralapsarian theses were seen as explicitly recognizing God as the author of sin, was considered at the synod. Maccovius managed to prove that his views did not deviate from Reformed orthodoxy, and the synod limited itself to issuing a warning against the use of scholastic language in his teaching. As a result, the Synod of Dort, adopting an infralapsarian definition of predestination in its canons, did not condemn supralapsarianism, deeming it more appropriate to present a united front against Pelagianism and Semi-Pelagianism.

Due to the subtle differences between the positions in the "lapsarian" dispute, identifying the affiliation of certain theologians with one camp or another can be challenging. The classification of Calvin's views in this regard remains a matter of debate. Among modern theologians, Karl Barth explicitly identified himself as a supralapsarian in his "Church Dogmatics," though an opposing view can also be substantiated. According to Professor Shao Kai Tseng, this occurred because Barth relied on the somewhat inaccurate historical-theological works of Heinrich Heppe and Alexander Schweizer, which caused the precise meaning of Reformed theologians' opinions to elude Barth.

=== Amyraldism and the Helvetic Consensus ===
The founder of Amyraldism, Moïse Amyraut (1596–1664), studied at the Huguenot Saumur Academy under the Scotsman John Cameron. Under his influence, Amyraut developed one of the systems of Hypothetical universalism. American historian Brian G. Armstrong classifies Amyraut within the humanistic strand of the Reformation, characteristic of French Protestantism (Note: Among other things, Amyraut authored a six-volume study on Christian ethics.). The goal of Amyraut's predestinarian theology was to defend Calvin's teaching against the innovations of Reformed scholastics, particularly the supralapsarianism of Theodore Beza. Substantively, Amyraut saw his task as answering why some people believe in God while others do not. According to his concept, God desires to save all people on the condition that they believe, but no one can fulfill this condition due to their depravity. Therefore, God desires to save only some and reject others, which constitutes the essence of God's decrees. Amyraut refused to address the questions that preoccupied Reformed scholastics, particularly the order of decrees, as they are "secrets are so profound, and the abyss so impossible to explore, that whoever will undertake to know them would necessarily be swallowed up by them or will necessarily remain eternally deluded as being in a completely inexplicable labyrinth".

At its core, Amyraut's teaching was based on the Saumur interpretation of Covenant theology. Instead of the commonly accepted Reformed two-part scheme contrasting the covenant of works and the covenant of grace, the Saumur theologians proposed a threefold covenant, viewed as three stages of the divine plan of salvation under the guidance of different persons of the Trinity: the covenants of nature, law, and grace. The last, established between God and humanity, requires faith in Christ and is divided into a conditional covenant of universal grace and an unconditional covenant of particular grace. This provided a basis for the doctrine of God's twofold will in predestination. Despite Amyraut's desire to present his views as a direct development of Calvin's teaching, he was accused of heresy three times (in 1637, 1644, and 1659). Although acquitted each time, the Helvetic Consensus, adopted in 1675, formalized the rejection of Amyraldism in Switzerland. Amyraldism played a minor role in the history of the Reformation but had a noticeable influence on the development of Protestantism in America, particularly among Baptists and Dispensationalists.

== In English Protestantism ==
=== In the early English Reformation ===
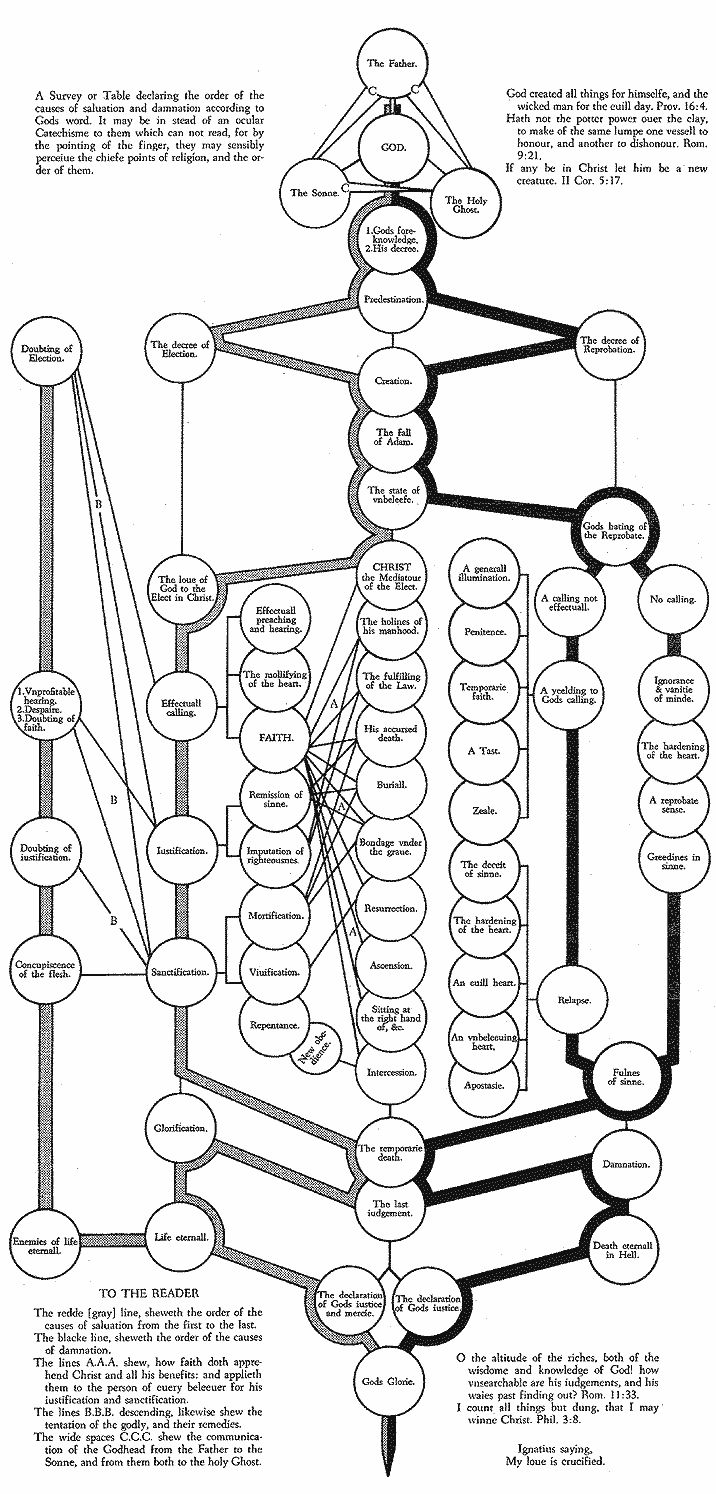
Diagram of the interconnections of key theological concepts according to William Perkins. The graphic method of presenting philosophical concepts is characteristic of Ramism

By the start of the Reformation, the doctrine of predestination was not new to England. The Scottish theologian John Duns Scotus (d. 1308) was a proponent of the idea of human cooperation with God in the matter of salvation. Opposing his approach, which was associated with Pelagianism, was Archbishop Thomas Bradwardine (d. 1349). John Wycliffe (d. 1384) agreed with him, asserting that true membership in the church, as well as faith, could only be received from God by the elect. Although King Henry VIII (1509–1547) did not accept the Protestant doctrine of grace in its Swiss form and leaned toward a semi-Pelagian meritocratic theology, the general atmosphere of his reign facilitated the spread of teachings in the spirit of the Continental Reformation in England. Following Luther, the first English Protestants asserted that true Christian piety begins with justification through grace by faith. In their theology, the idea of justification by faith was closely linked to the concept of Sanctification, that is, regeneration in holiness under the influence of the Holy Spirit. It was assumed that predestination to holiness also occurred before the beginning of time. Modern researchers suggest that the emphasis on sanctification predetermined the moralistic character of subsequent English Protestantism. As on the Continent, predestination in England was a "comforting" doctrine, allowing believers to be fully confident in their salvation. This was aided by the doctrine of Imputed righteousness or double justification, the notion that justification is achieved not by faith alone but also by works. William Tyndale (d. 1536) explained this as defining work as something that do not make people children of God, but it testifies and confirms their consciousness and that God has chosen them. During Henry VIII's reign, groups of radical sectarians emerged outside the official church, rejecting several established dogmas and religious practices, including the doctrine of predestination. To some extent, they can be linked to the Anabaptists who appeared in England from Holland.

During the reign of Edward VI (1547–1553), restrictions on expressing Reformed views were lifted, and the Protestant doctrine of grace became dominant in the Church of England. Numerous Continental theologians were invited to occupy professorial chairs at Oxford and Cambridge. Compiled with the participation of Archbishop Thomas Cranmer, the Books of Homilies of 1547 interpreted faith and salvation as divine gifts unrelated to human merits. The Swiss influence was even more evident in the 42 Articles of 1553, also edited by Cranmer. These affirmed justification by faith and the bondage of humanity in a state of sin, from which one could escape only through God-given grace. Article 17, included almost unchanged in the Thirty-Nine Articles of Anglican Confession, pertains to predestination and election. It defines predestination to life in terms of divine purpose (purpose) and will (decree), revealed before the foundation of the world in secret from humanity. The order of salvation outlined in the article follows Rom 8:28–31: Effectual calling (calling) through the Holy Spirit, obedience by grace, free justification, adoption, conformity to Christ (conformity), resulting in "walking righteously in good works and, in the end, by God's grace, receiving everlasting felicity" (everlasting felicitie). Article 17 completely omits mention of reprobation and does not address the topic of Assurance of salvation.

During the reign of Queen Mary (1553–1558), leaders of the English Reformation were either condemned as heretics or sent into exile, but their debates on predestination continued both in prisons and in exile. Protestants who emigrated to the Continent gained a better understanding of Reformed ideas about predestination. This particularly applies to the group of theologians who found themselves in Geneva. Among them, Anthony Gilby and John Knox wrote treatises on predestination, John Scory translated the works of Augustine, and William Whittingham translated those of Theodore Beza. Their works added little new to the ideas already present in English theology. The Geneva Bible, prepared by the exiles, along with its commentaries, was of great significance for spreading Reformed ideas about grace and salvation.

With the accession of Queen Elizabeth I (1558–1603), a new stage in the development of Protestant theology began, encompassing much of the reign of James I. The Elizabethan Religious Settlement, which involved minor changes to the wording of the Thirty-Nine Articles and Edwardian Books of Homilies, was intended to establish the boundaries of permissible theological discussion and define the country's stance on religious conflicts on the Continent. At that time, the theology of grace, through the efforts of popular preachers, began to spread among the people. Preaching grace in Christ and predestination as salvation solely through God-given grace became a central theme of the Puritan movement. In practical theology aimed at guiding the daily lives of believers, the theme of the order of salvation, from election to glorification, was developed. Until the early 17th century, the doctrine of predestination was not seen as a source of doctrinal disputes between moderate Protestants and nonconformists. Nevertheless, it gradually became an increasingly significant marker of religious identity, initially in relation to Catholicism and later among Protestants. To some extent, a correlation can be observed between Puritan nonconformism and the acceptance of the doctrine of predestination.

=== William Perkins's experimental predestination ===
The most significant figure in the period of the formation of English Reformed scholasticism is considered to be William Perkins (1558–1602). Perkins' application of logical analysis to theological problems was not in the Aristotelian tradition, as seen, for example, in Peter Martyr, but under the influence of the French Protestant Peter Ramus. The fullest expression of his views on predestination is found in his treatise Armilla aurea (A Golden Chain, 1590), which saw numerous Latin and English editions. His subsequent treatise, A Christian and Plain Treatise of the Manner and Order of Predestination, gained less popularity but was also frequently reprinted, especially until 1631. The main work of Jacob Arminius, Examen Modestum Libelli, was a response to it. Perkins' teaching is often characterized using the term coined by American theologian R. T. Kendall, "experimental predestinarianism", distinguishing it from doctrinal predestinarianism. The hallmark of the former is a shift in emphasis toward the practical activity of the clergy, fostering a piety based on Calvinist predestination and building a Christian community founded on such principles.

Perkins' teaching is based on the idea of God's eternal (eternal), immutable (immutable), and all-encompassing (all-embracing) will (decree). In his theology of predestination, regarding the problem of the existence of sin, Perkins follows the paradigm of Anselm of Canterbury, who asserted the absence of metaphysical reality in evil. Sin is not the presence of something but rather the absence of good. This approach allows Perkins to correlate the Fall of Adam with God's absolute will without making God the source of sin. According to Perkins, God's will is twofold. The general (general) will permits the existence of evil to the extent that it relates to good, and in this sense, it can be said that God willed Adam's Fall. The special (special) will pertains to what God deems right, and according to it, God does not desire Adam's Fall or human sins. Perkins uses an analogy: an official takes no pleasure in the death and execution of a wrongdoer, but by signing the death warrant, it can be said that he wills it. God stands in the same relation to all other worldly evil. Absolute evil does not exist, and things that are evil in themselves are good from the perspective of eternity.

Regarding predestination or "God's will concerning humanity", Perkins, in addition to his own view, identifies three others. First, he refutes the Pelagian perspective, which sees the cause of predestination in the individual who freely accepts or rejects grace. Second, he rejects the Lutheran approach, which, while accepting the doctrine of unconditional election to salvation, makes reprobation dependent on God's foreseen rejection of grace by the individual. Third, Perkins counts Semi-Pelagians among his opponents, who attribute predestination partly to God's mercy and partly to foreseen merits. Accordingly, the fourth possibility, which Perkins adheres to, constituting the Reformed dogma of double predestination, attributes the cause of salvation or damnation solely to God's good pleasure. According to Perkins' diagram, election and reprobation are in complete symmetry. Election is understood as God's sole free will to appoint a person to salvation through His grace. This decision is unchangeable, and one elected to salvation cannot fall away. Correspondingly, reprobation is the opposite decision through justice. To explain his thought more precisely, Perkins distinguishes two "acts" in reprobation. First, God leaves a person, manifesting His justice, not because of the individual's sinfulness but solely by His own will. Then, God appoints the person to punishment and destruction for their sins. Insisting on divine sovereignty over all creatures, Perkins sees no grounds for a person condemned to damnation to complain righteously. In response to those who claim that his scheme portrays God as cruel to His creatures by condemning them to hellish torments, Perkins replied that it is not correct to say that God created some for damnation by His will, but rather for the manifestation of His justice and glory concerning those subject to damnation. Perkins also denied that his teaching makes God the author of sin by creating those destined to sin. First, the cause of sin is the evil inherent in the individual, and second, the result of God's actions is the manifestation of His attributes, namely glory and justice. Finally, a distinction must be made between sin and the permission to commit it.

=== The English Revolution ===
Heated debates about predestination were conducted among university theologians. The culmination of disputes at Cambridge was the emergence of the Lambeth Articles, an attempt to eliminate the ambiguity and omissions of Article 17. The document did not receive official status, and its influence on subsequent polemics was minimal. An equally unsuccessful attempt was made by James I to reconcile nonconformists with the official church through the Hampton Court Conference of 1604; one of the issues troubling the Puritans was their desire to include the doctrine of predestination in the accepted dogma. Although the king did not support the Puritans—believed to be out of a desire to avoid troubling his subjects with complex matters of faith—he ordered the books of the Arminian Conrad Vorstius to be burned when the debate over free will began in Holland. Sending an English delegation to the Synod of Dort, James hoped to prevent the escalation of religious disputes in the country. With the changing political situation in the early 1620s in Europe, James again moved away from pro-Calvinist rhetoric and refused to recognize the synod's canons. Meanwhile, Arminianism, though not openly called such, gained supporters in England and became associated with the ritualistic high church. Continuing the schism, Puritans protested against what they called papist idolatry, while the official church's hierarchs showed indifference to preaching predestination. In the final years of King James's reign, tensions reached such a height that in 1622, all clergy below the rank of bishop were prohibited from preaching on election, reprobation, the resistibility, or irresistibility of grace.

In 1625, Charles I became king. The following year, he reaffirmed his father's ban on discussing predestination, but the Puritans were unwilling to stop debating an issue of utmost importance to them. Charles I's religious sympathies are not entirely clear, but, as before, Arminianism was more conducive to strengthening the king's authority over the church and state than the egalitarian predestination of the Puritans. After the death of the Calvinist George Abbot in 1633, the opponent of the Puritans, William Laud, was appointed Archbishop of Canterbury. Under him, Arminianism took on a different character than in Holland, effectively becoming the ideology of the Counter-Reformation in England. According to English historian Nicholas Tyacke, English Arminianism rejected the uncontrollable grace of predestination in favor of the accessible grace of church sacraments. In essence, the differences between Puritans and Laudians concerned the most fundamental questions about the nature of Christian salvation.

By the end of the 17th century, Calvinism in England declined, along with theology in general, and the intensity of debates over predestination significantly diminished. An important milestone in this process was the activity of a group of philosophers known as the Cambridge Platonists, who argued that in a rationally ordered religion, there was no place for doctrines like predestination. In the two decades before the Restoration of the Stuarts, they preached the idea that reason could verify the truth of revelation and that ethical ideals stem not from divine will but from the nature of things themselves.

== In the 18th–20th centuries ==
=== Among New England Calvinists ===
In the first half of the 18th century, many uncompromising Puritans migrated to New England, fearing Catholic dominance in the church. Their doctrinal foundation rested on the canons of the Synod of Dort and, shortly after its adoption, the Westminster Confession of Faith. From 1633, New England churches began requiring prospective members to provide detailed accounts of their spiritual conversion experiences, aligning with the teachings of William Perkins. Particular emphasis was placed on adherence to the order of salvation. The "father of Connecticut" Thomas Hooker (1586–1647) wrote extensively on the spiritual regeneration of sinners. First-generation emigrant Thomas Shepard (1605–1649), in his widely republished work The Sincere Convert, estimated the ratio of the elect to the reprobate as one to a thousand.

Several prominent colonial theologians of the late 17th century addressed predestination. Samuel Willard (1640–1707) defended classical Calvinist supralapsarian interpretations in his works, upholding God's freedom and the unconditionality of salvation. In his sermons, he argued that moral behavior entails submission to God's will, revealed to Adam in natural laws and later in the moral laws of the Old and New Testaments. Congregationalist Solomon Stoddard (1643–1729), acknowledging the lack of precise criteria for determining the presence of grace, advocated for inclusivity and allowed unregenerate individuals into the church. In his theological system, Stoddard introduced the concept of a "special" grace accessible only to the elect, distinct from "common" grace, granting a degree of Christ's love unattainable by the reprobate. His staunch opponent was Increase Mather (1639–1723), who insisted on church purity and opposed admitting those unable to demonstrate evidence of saving grace to the sacraments. However, despite differing with Stoddard on admitting the unregenerate and unbelievers to communion, Mather agreed with him on recognizing God's sovereign right to bestow grace on the elect. His son Cotton Mather (1663–1728) also upheld Calvinist orthodoxy, publishing a 1702 treatise refuting English Arminianism and defending unconditional election, irresistible grace, and justification by faith through Christ's imputed righteousness.

In the 1710s, English Arminians began critiquing Calvinism, rejecting not only predestination but also other key doctrines such as imputed guilt, imputed righteousness, and original sin. The debate was sparked by preacher Daniel Whitby's treatise Discourse on the Five Points (1710). By the 1730s, these disputes reached New England. Numerous accusations of "Arminianism" were recorded, but attempts to challenge unconditional election and limited grace continued in subsequent decades.

=== Methodism and modern Arminianism ===
The founder of Methodism, John Wesley (1703–1791), vehemently opposed the Calvinist doctrine of double predestination, deeming unconditional predestination to reprobation anathema for diminishing God's love and justice. Wesley believed the Catholic Church held to predestination until the Council of Trent, when it rejected it to counter Calvin and Luther. In many of his works, he directly attacked Calvinism, accusing it of attributing to God the direction of the reprobate toward evil. Although in his sermon Free Grace Wesley listed reasons why predestination contradicts Scripture, he also agreed with his friend George Whitefield that some individuals could be predestined to salvation. Overall, Wesley viewed predestination as God's foreknowledge of faith or unbelief, or more precisely, the acceptance of grace. In a distinctly Arminian vein, he described God's foreknowledge of deeds as non-deterministic and non-causal; God simply knows because they exist. Conversely, knowing those who will believe, He calls them by the Spirit and the Word. American Methodist Wilbur Fisk (1792–1839) argued that both Calvinists and their opponents ascribed meanings to biblical language foreign to it, asserting that the Apostle Paul's texts said nothing about the election of individuals to salvation.

A consistent Methodist (or Wesleyan-Arminian) doctrine of predestination was developed by Richard Watson (1781–1833). Watson wholly rejected unconditional election of individuals but allowed for Corporate election of groups or nations, particularly the church. Individual election, for Watson, was conditioned by foreknowledge, significantly diverging from Wesley and Arminius by denying the timeless nature of eternity, as well as God's impassibility and immutability. These attributes, Watson argued, would prevent God from responding to prayers, interacting with humans, or foreknowing events in time. In the second half of the 19th century, American Methodist John Miley (1813–1895) held similar views. In the 20th century, these perspectives were echoed by Thomas Oden (1931–2016), Nazarenes Henry Orton Wiley (1877–1961), and H. Ray Dunning (born 1926).

In modern Arminian discourse, concepts of "middle knowledge" or Molinism and open theism are widespread. The former, originating with Spanish Jesuit Luis de Molina (1535–1600), posits that God possesses three types of knowledge at the moment of creation. The first concerns what is possible due to the natural constraints of the world. The second includes knowledge of essential facts that must occur. Between these lies middle or counterfactual knowledge, concerning what would happen under certain circumstances. Through middle knowledge, God could effect predestination without negating free will. Among contemporary theologians, William Lane Craig (born 1949) has devoted significant attention to middle knowledge. According to Craig, God knows how each person will exercise their freedom in given circumstances, accepting or rejecting grace. Some modern Arminians, rejecting middle knowledge, align with open theism, which holds that divine foreknowledge is incompatible with libertarian free will. Open theists believe God cannot exhaustively know the future, leaving some possibilities undetermined.

=== In Schleiermacher ===
The views of German theologian Friedrich Schleiermacher (1768–1834) significantly influenced the modern development of predestination doctrine. His initial engagements with the topic arose during discussions aimed at realizing the Prussian Protestant Union of Calvinists and Lutherans. As in the 16th century, disagreements centered on Eucharistic theology and predestination. A specific issue was defining what constitutes divine election within the Protestant paradigm of human inability to achieve salvation independently. Prussian Lutheran leader Carl Gottlieb Bretschneider (1776–1848) was uncompromising, insisting Calvinists acknowledge God's desire for universal salvation. In contrast, Schleiermacher, in his essay Ueber die Lehre von der Erwählung, sought arguments to bridge these differences. Bretschneider argued that the notion of human inability to seek salvation was false, necessitating the rejection of immutable decrees of election and reprobation. Schleiermacher countered that desiring good without grace, or "higher assistance," is futile, and discussing free will in theological contexts is problematic. He also noted that Bretschneider's view contradicted the Lutheran tradition and the anti-Pelagian thrust of the Augsburg Confession, particularly its fifth article, which speaks of faith's dissemination through the Holy Spirit. Schleiermacher equated predestination with the presence or absence of divine assistance, arguing that the "natural moral sentiments" Bretschneider observed were not innate but derived from bourgeois societal morality. The "dire consequences" for public morality that Bretschneider feared—whether from those presuming election or convinced of reprobation—Schleiermacher deemed avoidable. Thus, the Calvinist theologian concluded that the doctrine of election best justifies the necessity of grace for salvation through Jesus Christ. On reconciling the doctrine of election with universal redemption in Christ, Schleiermacher and Bretschneider failed to agree but clearly articulated their positions. Lutherans held that God foresees some individuals' unbelief, while Calvinists maintained that God does not will to grant faith to all. Regarding those who never heard the Gospel, they agreed God owes nothing to humanity, and such was His will.

Schleiermacher's most original contribution to the election debate was his development of a single divine will acting on both the faithful and unfaithful, aiming to resolve difficulties posed by the Lutheran concept of a dual will for the elect and reprobate. Lutheran tradition suggested God's will desires universal salvation but affects only the elect. Various approaches distinguished between antecedent or consequent wills or general and particular wills, introducing temporal dynamics into divine nature. Some Lutherans, like Johann Gerhard, based the distinction on opposing divine mercy, requiring universal salvation, and justice, demanding differential retribution. Schleiermacher argued that in God's will, the general and particular are unified, as "only specific objects can be conceived in His will." For Schleiermacher, believers receive grace as believers for Christ's sake, while unbelievers are condemned as unbelievers outside Christ. Though each part of this statement was not novel, it emphasized Christ's activity more clearly than traditional formulations by Augustine and Calvin. Schleiermacher's overarching conclusion was that a single divine decree, grounded in God's will, exists, not two as in traditional Calvinism.

In his major work The Christian Faith (1822), Schleiermacher structures and expands his election ideas. Within his theological system, predestination is linked to ecclesiology. The Christian church is understood as a pious monotheistic community where the highest form of self-consciousness is a sense of "absolute dependence". Schleiermacher rejects the notion of original human righteousness later lost, asserting humanity's original sinfulness, with its entire history unfolding in the context of sin. Sin is understood not in isolation but in relation to the decree of redemption, encompassing humanity's original perfection and sinfulness. In his essay, the distinction between believers and unbelievers was justified by the gradual, historical realization of God's kingdom. In a broader perspective, considering redemption's universal nature, Schleiermacher concluded there is no distinction between believers and unbelievers, affirming a unified predestination for all. While he did not deduce universal salvation from universal election —except for those dying in union with Christ— he considered it as plausible as eternal damnation for unbelievers.

=== In Karl Barth ===
In the theology of prominent Calvinist theologian Karl Barth (1886–1968), two revisions of predestination doctrine are distinguished. The first was articulated in his commentary on the Epistle to the Romans (1922) and early systematic theology lectures, known as the Göttingen Dogmatics (1924–1925). The second, aligning more closely with Schleiermacher, appeared in the second part of volume II of his Church Dogmatics (1936–1942). According to the later Barth, Jesus Christ's crucifixion is the paramount act of God's participation in human history. From this, he asserted that "the very name of Jesus Christ is the foundation of the doctrine of election". (Note: Although Barth claimed this approach was not novel in theology, he is often criticized for "Christomonism," an excessive focus on divine providence in Christ.) In this context, theological tradition draws on Eph 1:4–5, Eph 3:10–12, and Rom 8:29–30; G. C. Berkouwer adds 2Tim 1:9. In Barth's dogmatic system, the doctrine of predestination or gracious election (German: Gnadenwahl) is the "sum of the Gospel". Developing his doctrine of God as love and freedom, revealed as a subject in Jesus Christ's name, Barth speaks of God's sovereign act of electing humanity as the object of His love and grace. Critiquing classical Reformed theology, such as Loraine Boettner's exposition, Barth lamented that if Calvin's predestination doctrine were less speculative and more biblical, it would be more compelling. By establishing symmetry between divine election and reprobation, rendering it "neutral from a natural-scientific perspective," Calvin failed to affirm God's definitive "yes". Barth's primary critique is that, as the essence of the Gospel —or "good news"— the doctrine should convey unambiguous positivity to believers, not the ambiguity arising from double predestination and reprobation. For Barth, Christ is the sole object of both election and damnation, as well as the one who elects and rejects. The teleological link between election and reprobation is not an individual act of God but occurred once for all in Christ's crucifixion.

Although Barth's theology was innovative, he frequently addressed historical theology. He endorsed the canons of the Synod of Dort, as they framed gracious election as good news. Rejecting the "lapsarian debates," he leaned toward the supralapsarian position, as it less separated creation from redemption, which he viewed together. While acknowledging both components of double predestination, he did not do so traditionally. In Reformed theology, the existence of the "non-elect" and "reprobation" is a necessary inference from "elect" and "election." Per the Westminster Confession, accepted by all Reformed churches, "the rest of mankind God was pleased to pass by, and to ordain them to dishonor and wrath for their sin, to the praise of His glorious justice" (III.7). American theologian Loraine Boettner remarked that "mild Calvinists" who downplay reprobation are like an eagle flying with one wing or a disease. Despite centuries of debate, the view that Calvinism’s doctrine of reprobation—predestination of some to damnation—misaligns with Scripture’s spirit is widespread. Since the Synod of Dort, it has been a primary point of contention with Arminians. For Roger Olson, such a concept, if logically extended, equates God with the devil. Barth called the Augustinian tendency to treat election and reprobation as parallel acts a deviation from biblical testimony, finding no basis for such symmetry. Yet, in Augustine, Barth noted a "healing restraint," avoiding reducing these concepts to a common denominator. Augustine typically understood praedestinatio as praedestinatio ad gratiam ("predestination to grace"), later adopted by Peter Lombard. In this positive sense, predestination equates to electio ("election") and excludes reprobatio.

Barth’s longtime critic, Swiss theologian Emil Brunner (1889–1966), consistently challenged his predestination doctrine. Brunner’s main critique targeted Barth’s election theory as baseless and leading to universalism. Brunner developed his own election doctrine, opposing both Barth and classical Calvinist double predestination. He argued that these theories erred by probing beyond divine revelation in seeking the eternal essence of election. Brunner rejected any "logical theory" of election, favoring what he deemed a truly dialectical, biblical view. He considered faith as a response to personal experience the correct starting point for the doctrine. As Israel’s election meant the chosen people knew of their grace, Christians are similarly positioned regarding Christ. Brunner also deemed erroneous the Reformation’s denial of synergism, which exaggerated human passivity in salvation, leading to flawed election doctrines. Double predestination, per Brunner, negates human responsibility, a flaw shared by Barth’s universalism.

== Impact on society ==
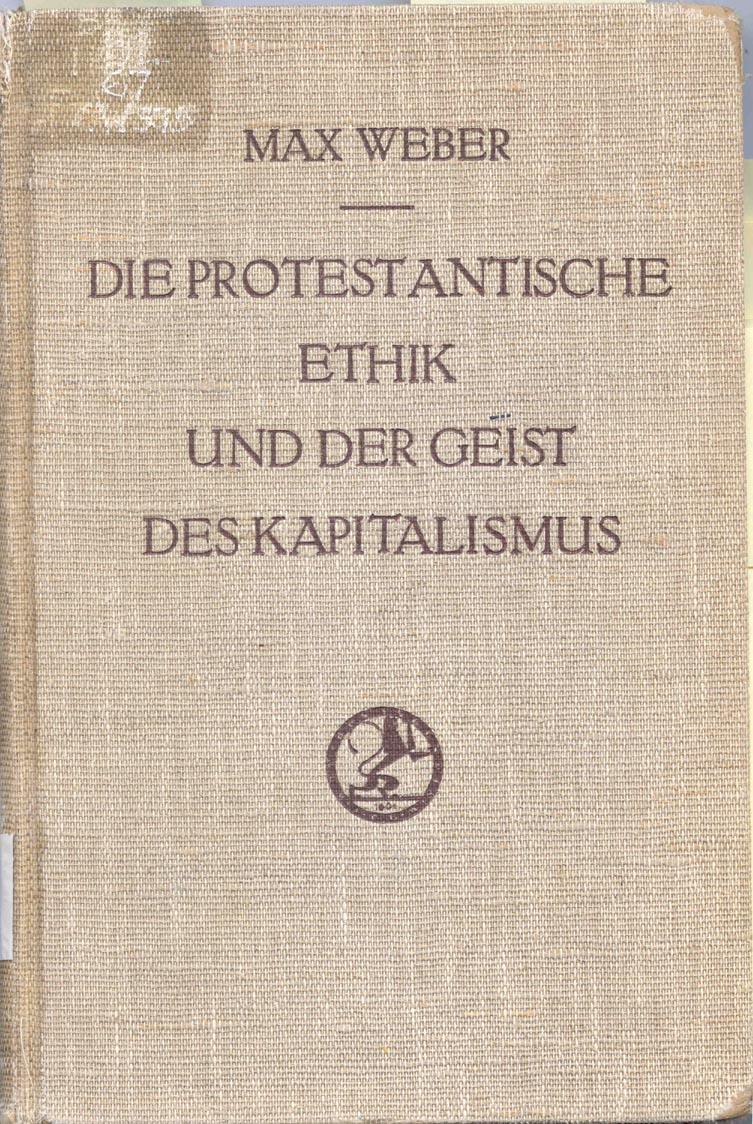
Cover of the German edition of The Protestant Ethic and the Spirit of Capitalism by Max Weber

Many Protestant authors emphasized the significant impact of the doctrine of predestination on societal morality. Calvin, introducing his doctrine, highlights its utility and even its "sweetest fruits," noting three beneficial properties: it teaches us to place full trust in God's free mercy, reveals God's glory in its full majesty, and instructs us in true humility. According to Loraine Boettner, a developed doctrine of predestination enables Calvinism to compete effectively with Asian religions and philosophically deterministic systems. Conversely, Karl Barth rejects such a utilitarian approach, urging that predestination be considered solely from a theological perspective and evaluated only by its biblical grounding. Nevertheless, predestination often becomes a topic of non-theological discussion, particularly regarding the issue of assurance of salvation. For many believers, it is crucial to know whether they belong to the elect or the reprobate, whether they will be saved or not. Are there grounds for hope beyond faith in Christ? Can one infer election or reprobation based on an analysis of one's relationship with God, inner aspirations, or behavior? Does posing such questions violate the principles of sola fide and sola gratia, and is the search for such signs itself indicative of a lack of faith and grace? These considerations form the starting point for discussing the "practical syllogism" (syllogismus practicus). Whether Calvin himself endorsed the practical syllogism is debated. Reformed theologian Wilhelm Niesel rejects this notion, noting that Calvin urged seeking salvation in Christ, practicing humility, and not prioritizing confidence in one's salvation (24, 4–5).

According to German sociologist Max Weber, the characteristic active lifestyle of Calvinists stems from a sense of uncertainty and dread arising from accepting the doctrine of God's complete freedom in election. Like Niesel, Weber does not attribute these behavioral deviations to Calvin himself but to his "epigones," through whom uncertainty entered the layperson's consciousness. Modern scholars note that Weber's perspective, as expressed in The Protestant Ethic and the Spirit of Capitalism, is based on a superficial understanding of Calvinist dogmatics, rendering his conclusions about Protestant pessimism inaccurate. Nonetheless, outside purely religious discourse, the notion that predestination induces pessimism, melancholy, and general mental distress is widespread. Although The Anatomy of Melancholy by Robert Burton (1621) recommends reading certain Puritan works to restore mental balance, the same author critiques overzealous pastors whose sermons on election and its signs drive believers nearly to madness. A notable example of what literary scholar John Stachniewski termed "persecutory imagination" is the diaries of London merchant Nehemiah Wallington (1598–1658), filled with descriptions of despair and feelings of abandonment by God. Among many other examples are the book Plaine Mans Path-way to Heaven (1601) by Puritan Arthur Dent, which, by 1640, had seen 25 editions and spoke of "thousands upon thousands" predestined to damnation; the troubling story of Italian apostate Francesco Spiera (d. 1548), recounted in various versions; or the poem The Day of Doom (1662) by Michael Wigglesworth, considered the most terrifying depiction of predestination in American literature.

Religious debates found expression in the works of English metaphysical poets. In his Holy Sonnets, John Donne (1571–1631) follows the "experimental" approach of William Perkins, aiding believers in gradually realizing the concept of election. Donne’s contemporary, George Herbert (1593–1633), expressed the Calvinist idea of double predestination in his poem "The Water-course," attributing to God the authority to grant individuals what they deserve, whether salvation or damnation. A common interpretation views the novel The Private Memoirs and Confessions of a Justified Sinner (1824) by Scottish author James Hogg (1770–1835) as a satire on the doctrine of predestination. The novel’s protagonist, an orthodox Calvinist, knows he is elected to salvation and believes his reward is assured regardless of how he lives his life. Tempted by the devil, he commits various crimes, including attempting to murder his brother, but ultimately, consumed by guilt, he takes his own life.

== Historiography ==
Predestination has been a central element in the theoretical frameworks proposed by historians of Protestantism since the 19th century. Richard Muller examined the evolution of the understanding of Reformed orthodoxy dynamics. According to Muller's schema, the earliest religious studies theories described the history of Reformed theology as the development of the doctrine of predestination. Muller identified five distinct approaches, differing in their assessment of the positive nature of this development and the degree of continuity with Calvin's teachings, In the mid-19th century, Alexander Schweizer, building on the concepts of his teacher Friedrich Schleiermacher, identified the thesis of absolute divine predestination as the foundation for Reformed theologians' attempts to construct a synthetic, deductive, and irrefutable theological system. A similar view was held by Tübingen School founder Ferdinand Christian Baur, who saw the development of doctrine in the early church as the result of the internal evolution of the foundational kerygma. According to Baur's analysis, Protestant theology follows the same structure as early Christian theology, differing in its internal principle, which for Protestantism is divine predestination. Due to the authority of Schweizer and Baur, the notion of predestination as the "central dogma" in Calvin's theology dominated scholarship until the mid-20th century. In the works of their contemporary Heinrich Heppe, there was a slight shift in evaluating components of the dogmatic complex. In his biography of Theodore Beza (1861), Heppe called Beza's Tabula praedestinationis the foundation of subsequent Reformed theology. In his influential survey of 16th-century dogmatics (1857), Heppe placed the doctrine of predestination on par with the concepts of God and the Trinity, whereas Calvin himself considered predestination in the context of faith and justification. Unlike Schweizer, who viewed predestination positively and believed it could be reconciled with free will, Heppe argued that predestination reduces humans to puppets. Both approaches found followers in the 20th century. Baur's Hegelian theory was developed by Hans Emil Weber, who reduced the orthodoxy of the two main Protestant branches to their core principles—justification in Lutheranism and the "providential system" in Calvinism. Weber contrasted the latter with the "idealistic humanism" of Arminianism=Arminianism. The influence of the scholastic method on Reformed orthodoxy was studied by German theologian Paul Althaus, who argued that predestination became a speculative foundation for Reformed dogmatics, which developed into a coherent system under the influence of scholastic methodology.

Studies from the first half of the 20th century generally followed the established paradigm, with the prevailing view attributing the perception of predestination as a central principle not to Huldrych Zwingli or Calvin but to their successors, particularly Theodore Beza, rejecting Schweizer and Heppe's view of Calvin's theology as a cohesive system. It also became accepted that predestination was not a defining moment in Calvin's teachings, gaining such prominence in Calvinism only after the Synod of Dort in 1619. The influence of Calvin's teachings on his followers was reassessed in favor of the latter.

Subsequent studies explored the continuity of Reformed theology from the 16th to 18th centuries through other oppositions to Calvin's teachings. One approach, originating with German religious historian Paul Jacobs, identified reliance on Scripture and Christocentricity as the main characteristics of Calvin's system, while describing the theology of Calvinists as Aristotelian, rational, scholastic, and providential. The resulting term "reformed scholasticism" refers to both the corresponding academic methodology and a perceived lack of religious warmth and intellectual originality. Key figures in the scholastic movement include Peter Martyr Vermigli, Girolamo Zanchi, Theodore Beza, Martin Chemnitz, Jacobus Arminius, and others. Another approach to identifying differences between Calvin's theology and that of his successors is offered through the paradigm of covenant theology.

== Bibliography ==
=== English language sources ===
- Andrew Penny, D. (1990). Freewill Or Predestination: The Battle Over Saving Grace in Mid-Tudor England. Woodbridge: The Boydell Press. p. 249. ISBN 0-86193-219-6.
- Arand C. P., Nestingen J. A., Kolb R. (2012). The Lutheran Confessions: History and Theology of the Book of Concord. Minneapolis: Fortress Press. p. 296. ISBN 978-1-451-41059-4.
- O'Banion, P. J. (2005). Jerome Zanchi, the Application of Theology, and the Rise of the English Practical Divinity Tradition // Renaissance and Reformation. Vol. 29. Toronto: Centre for Reformation and Renaissance Studies. ISSN 0034-429X.
- Armstrong, B. G. (1969). Calvinism and the Amyraut Herecy. Madison: University of Wisconsin Press. p. 318. ISBN 978-0-299-05490-8.
- Beeke, J. (2003). Theodore Beza's Supralapsarian Predestination: in 12 vol. // Reformation & Revival Journal. Vol. 12. Carol Stream: Reformation & Revival Ministries, Inc. pp. 69–84.
- Beeke, J. R. (2017). Debated Issues in Sovereign Predestination: Early Lutheran Predestination, Calvinian Reprobation, and Variations in Genevan Lapsarianism. Göttingen: Vandenhoeck & Ruprecht. p. 252. ISBN 978-3-647-55260-6.
- Berkouwer, G. C. (1960). Divine Election. Grand Rapids: Wm. B. Eerdmans Publishing. p. 336. ISBN 0-8028-4812-3.
- Boettner, L. (1974). The Reformed Doctrine of Predestination. Phillipsburg: P&R Publishing. p. 439.
- Brenner, J. M. (2012). The Election Controversy Among Lutherans in the Twentieth Century: An Examination of the Underlying Problems. Milwaukee: Marquette University. p. 329.
- Brooks Holifield, E. (2003). Theology in America: Christian Thought from the Age of the Puritans to the Civil War. New Heawen: Yale University Press. p. 617. ISBN 978-0-300-09574-6.
- Buis, H. (1958). Historic Protestantism and Predestination. Eugene: Wipf and Stock. p. 152.
- Grenz S. J., Olson R. E. (1992). 20th-Century Theology: God the World in a Transitional Age. London: InterVarsity Press. p. 393. ISBN 978-0-8308-1525-8.
- Donnelly, J. P. (1976a). Italian Influences on the Development of Calvinist Scholasticism // The Sixteenth Century Journal. Vol. 7. Kirksville: Truman State University Press. pp. 81–101. doi:10.2307/2539631. ISSN 0361-0160. JSTOR 2539631. 2–4.
- Donnelly, J. P. (1976b). Calvinism and Scholasticism in Vermigli's Doctrine of Man and Grace. Leiden: E.J. Brill. p. 235.
- Farrelly, J. (1962). Predestination, Grace, and Free Will. London: Burns & Oates. p. 317.
- Fesko, J. V. (2011). Lapsarian Diversity at the Synod of Dort // Drawn into Controversie: Reformed Theological Diversity and Debates Within Seventeenth-Century British Puritanism. Göttingen: Vandenhoeck & Ruprecht. pp. 99–123.
- Gibson, D. (2009). Reading the Decree. Exegesis, Election and Christology in Calvin and Barth. London: T&T Clark. p. 218. ISBN 978-0-567-46874-1.
- Gockel, M. (2006). Barth and Schleiermacher on the Doctrine of Election. Oxford; New York: Oxford University Press. p. 229.
- Hoyle, D. (2007). Reformation and Religious Identity in Cambridge, 1590-1644. History of the University of Cambridge. Woodbridge: Boydell & Brewer. p. 256.
- Kolb, R. (1976). Nikolaus von Amsdorf on Vessels of Wrath and Vessels of Mercy: A Lutheran's Doctrine of Double Predestination // Harvard Theological Review. Vol. 69. Cambridge, MA: Cambridge University Press on behalf of Harvard Divinity School. pp. 325–343.
- Lewalski, B. (2014). Protestant Poetics and the Seventeenth-Century Religious Lyric. Princeton: Princeton University Press. p. 536. ISBN 978-0-691-06395-9.
- Levering, M. (2011). Predestination. Biblical and Theological Paths. Oxford: Oxford University Press. p. 228.
- Matthew Pinson, J. (2002). Four Views on Eternal Security. Counterpoints: Bible and Theology. New York: Zondervan Academic. p. 302. ISBN 978-0-310-23439-5.
- McGoldrick, J. E. (1999). Luther's Doctrine Of Predestination // Reformation and Revival. Vol. 9. Carol Stream: Reformation & Revival Ministries, Inc. pp. 81–103.
- McGrath, A. E. (2005). Iustitia Dei: A History of the Christian Doctrine of Justification. Cambridge: Cambridge University Press. p. 448. ISBN 978-0-521-62481-7.
- Moore, J. D. (2007). English Hypothetical Universalism. John Preston and the Softening of Reformed Theology. Grand Rapids: Wm. B. Eerdmans Publishing Co. p. 304. ISBN 978-0-8028-2057-0.
- Moreschini, С. (2014). Goodness, Evil and The Free Will of Man in Gregory of Nyssa // Fate, Providence and Moral Responsibility in Ancient, Medieval and Early Modern Thought. Ancient and Medieval Philosophy; Series 1. Vol. 49. Leuven: Leuven University Press. pp. 343–356. ISBN 978-90-5867-970-3.
- Muller, R. A. (2003). After Calvin: studies in the development of a theological tradition. Oxford: Oxford University Press. p. 275. ISBN 0-19-515701-X.
- Muller, R. A. (2008). Christ and the Decree: Christology and Predestination in Reformed Theology from Calvin to Perkins. Ada: Baker Publishing Group. p. 254. ISBN 978-1-4412-3907-5.
- Neelands, D. (2009). Predestination and the Thirty-nine Articles // A Companion to Peter Martyr Vermigli. Leiden: BRILL. pp. 355–374. ISBN 978-90-04-17554-9.
- Niesel, W. (1956). The Theology Of Calvin. London: Westminster Press. p. 254.
- Oberman, H. A. (2003). The Two Reformations: The Journey from the Last Days to the New World. New Heawen: Yale University Press. p. 235. ISBN 0-300-09868-5.
- Olson, R. E. (2006). Arminian Theology: Myths and Realities. Westmont: InterVarsity Press. p. 250. ISBN 978-0-8308-7443-9.
- Patterson, W. B. (2014). William Perkins and the Making of a Protestant England. Oxford: Oxford University Press. p. 278. ISBN 978-0-19-968152-5.
- Pearse, M. T. (1992). Between Known Men and Visible Saints: A Study in Sixteenth-century English Dissent. Cranbury, N.J.: Associated University Presses. p. 280. ISBN 0-8386-3563-6.
- Porro, P. (2014). Divine Predestination, Human Merit and Moral Responsibility. The Reception of Augustine's Doctrine of Irresistible Grace in Thomas Aquinas, Henry of Ghent and John Duns Scotus // Fate, Providence and Moral Responsibility in Ancient, Medieval and Early Modern Thought. Leuven: Leuven University Press. pp. 553–570. ISBN 978-90-5867-970-3.
- Sammons, P. (2020). Reprobation: from Augustine to the Synod of Dort: The Historical Development of the Reformed Doctrine of Reprobation. Göttingen: Vandenhoeck & Ruprecht. p. 154. ISBN 978-3-525-56483-7.
- The Calvin Handbook / Selderhuis (ed.). Oxford: Oxford University Press. 2009. p. 585. ISBN 978-0-8028-6230-3.
- Schmidt, J. (2007). Melancholy and the Care of the Soul. Religion, Moral Philosophy and Madness in Early Modern England. Andershot: Ashgate. p. 217. ISBN 978-0-7546-5748-4.
- Thuesen, P. J. (2009). Predestination. The American Career of a Contentious Doctrine. Oxford: Oxford University Press. p. 309. ISBN 978-0-19-517427-4.
- Shao Kai Tseng (2016). Karl Barth's Infralapsarian Theology: Origins and Development, 1920-1953. Westmont: InterVarsity Press. p. 319. ISBN 978-0-8308-9982-1.
- Tyacke, N. (1973). Puritanism, Arminianism and Counter-Revolution // The Origins of the English Civil War. London: Macmillan. pp. 119–143. ISBN 978-0-333-12400-0.
- Stucco, G. (2014). The Catholic Doctrine of Predestination from Luther to Jansenius. New York: Xlibris Corporation. p. 312. ISBN 978-1-4931-9760-6.
- Wallace, D. D. (1982). Puritans and Predestination: Grace in English Protestant Theology, 1525-1695. Eugene: Wipf and Stock. p. 304. ISBN 1-59244-590-X.
- Wendel, F. (1963). Calvin. The Origins And Development Of His Religious Thought. Cambridge: Cambridge University Press. p. 383.
- White, P. (1992). Predestination, Policy and Polemic: Conflict and Consensus in the English Church from the Reformation to the Civil War. Cambridge: Cambridge University Press. p. 336. ISBN 0-521-39433-3.

=== Russian language sources ===
- Barth, K. (2007). Церковная догматика [Church dogmatics]. Современное богословие (in Russian). Vol. I. М.: ББИ. p. 560. ISBN 978-5-89647-141-7.
- Karpov, К. (2014). "Доктрины предопределения в средневековой философской теологии // Государство, религия, церковь в России и за рубежом" [Doctrines of Predestination in Medieval Philosophical Theology // State, Religion, Church in Russia and Abroad]. Государство, Религия, Церковь В России И За Рубежом (in Russian). 1 (32). М.: РАНХиГС: 228–250. ISSN 2073-7203.
- Hoeksema, G. (2007). Вера наших отцов: изложение Канонов Дортского Синода [Our Fathers' Faith: an exposition of the Canons of the Synod of Dort] (in Russian). М.: ИКАР. p. 198. ISBN 978-5-7974-0138-4.
