= Assurance (theology) =

Christian doctrine on confidence in God and salvation

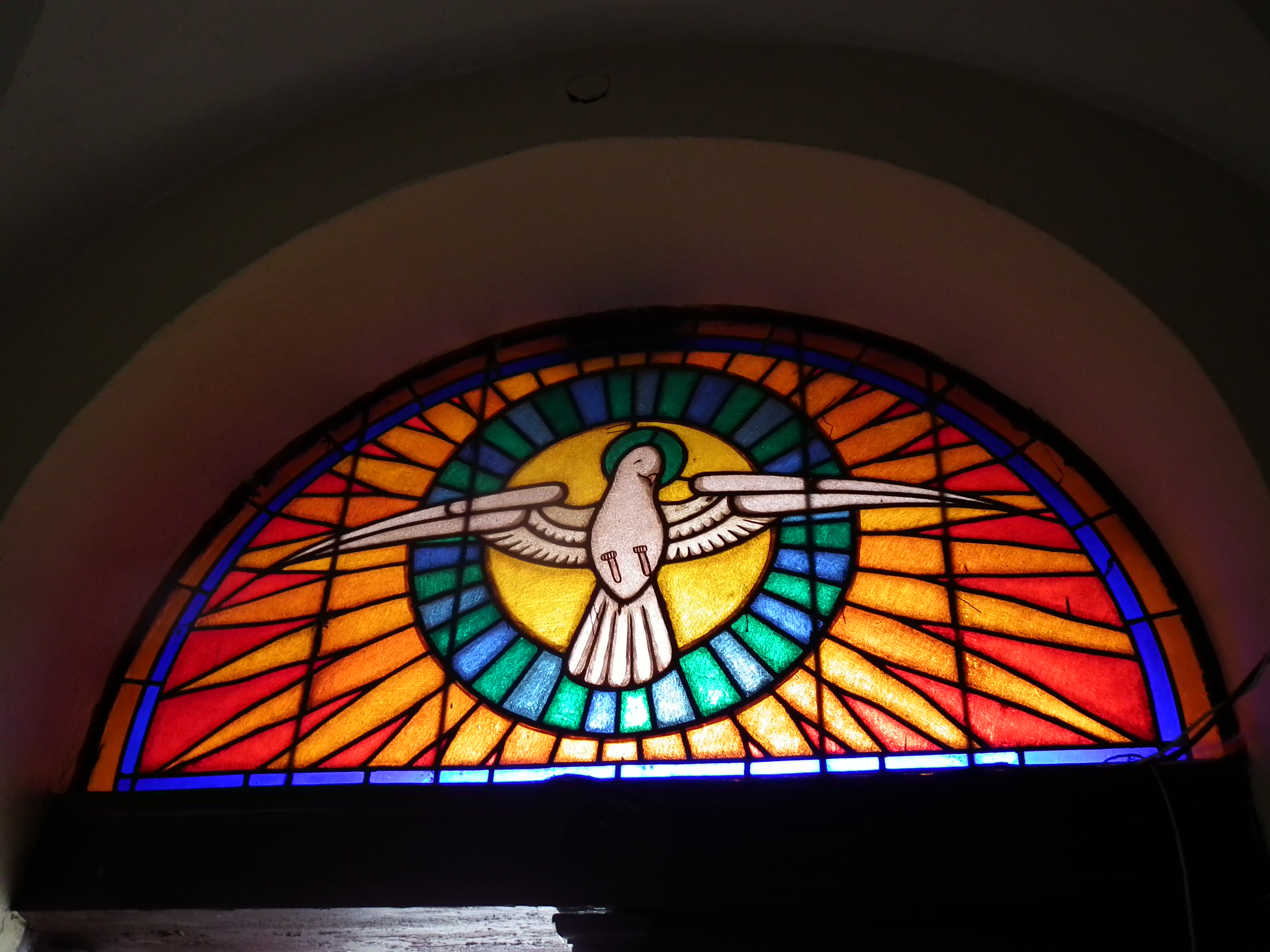
The Holy Spirit depicted as a dove; assurance was described by John Wesley as the "Witness of the Spirit".

In Christian theology, assurance refers to a believer's confidence in God, in God's response to prayer, and in the hope of eternal salvation. In Protestant Christian doctrine, the term "assurance", also known as the Witness of the Spirit, affirms that the inner witness of the Holy Spirit allows the Christian disciple to know that they are justified. Based on the writings of St. Augustine of Hippo, assurance was historically an important doctrine in Lutheranism and Reformed Christianity, and remains a distinguishing doctrine of Methodism, although there are differences among these Christian traditions. Hymns that celebrate the witness of the Holy Spirit, such as Fanny Crosby's "Blessed Assurance", are sung in Christian liturgies to celebrate the belief in assurance.

== Methodism ==
=== Wesleyan Methodism ===
The Historical Statement in The Book of Discipline of the Southern Congregational Methodist Church offers a background on the Witness of the Holy Spirit:

The one thing the trip did was to introduce him to some Moravians who appeared to have something in their religion that Wesley did not have but was seeking. They testified to him of joyful faith, earnest prayer and their conviction of the merits of the religious method of justification through faith. Wesley wrote: "I began to see that true religion was seated in the heart, and that God's law extended to our thoughts as well as words and actions." On March 5, 1738, his written testimony said: "I was fully convinced of the want of that faith whereby we are saved." The text "If any man be in Christ, he is a new creature", increased his quest to be born again. On May 24, 1738, Wesley earnestly sought God all day. He went to a prayer meeting in a secluded room on Aldersgate Street in London. A layman was reading Luther's Preface to the Epistle of the Romans, and Wesley wrote: "While he (Luther) was describing the change which God works in the heart through faith in Christ, I felt my heart strangely warmed. I felt I did trust in Christ, Christ alone, for salvation and the assurance was given me that He had taken away my sins, even mine, and saved me from the law of sin and death." John rushed to his brother's home to share his good news with Charles who had had the experience three days earlier. After this, John testified that the Spirit bore witness with his spirit that he was a Child of God, and this assurance gave him spiritual boldness. "I believe every Christian, who has not yet received it should pray for the witness of God's Spirit that he is a Child of God. This witness, I believe, is necessary to my salvation." This experience of the heart "strangely warmed" became a motivating experience characteristic of Methodism. Wesley's years of patiently studying and seeking the Lord had gained him the title "organizer". Now he was prepared to give back to Christianity the doctrine that had been suppressed for hundreds of years: the doctrine of the witness of the Spirit. The Moravians taught the doctrine, but John Wesley was God's man to organize the vehicle to spread it across the world: Methodism.

John Wesley believed that all Christians have a faith which implies an assurance of God's forgiving love, and that one would feel that assurance, or the "witness of the Spirit". This understanding is grounded in Paul's affirmation, "...ye have received the Spirit of adoption, whereby we cry Abba, Father. The same Spirit beareth witness with our spirits, that we are the children of God..." (Romans 8:15–16, Wesley's translation). This experience was mirrored for Wesley in his Aldersgate experience wherein he "knew" he was loved by God and that his sins were forgiven.

"I felt my heart strangely warmed. I felt I did trust in Christ, Christ alone for salvation, and an assurance was given me that He had taken my sin, even mine."—Wesley's Journal.

Early in his ministry Wesley had to defend his understanding of assurance. In 1738, Arthur Bedford had published a sermon in which he misquoted Wesley's teachings. Bedford had misunderstood Wesley as saying that a Christian could be assured of persevering in a state of salvation, the Reformed (Calvinistic) view.

In a letter dated September 28, 1738, Wesley wrote, "The assurance of which I alone speak I should not choose to call an assurance of salvation, but rather (with the Scriptures), the assurance of faith. ...[This] is not the essence of faith, but a distinct gift of the Holy Ghost, whereby God shines upon his own work, and shows us that we are justified through faith in Christ. ...The 'full assurance of faith' (Hebrews 10.22) is 'neither more nor less than hope; or a conviction, wrought in us by the Holy Ghost, that we have a measure of the true faith in Christ.'"

The full assurance of faith taught by Wesleyan Methodists is the Holy Spirit's witness to a person who has been regenerated and entirely sanctified. This full assurance of faith "excludes all doubt and fear since the heart has now been perfected in love", consistent with a Wesleyan–Arminian interpretation of 1 John 4:18, which proclaims "There is no fear in love; but perfect love casteth out fear: because fear hath torment. He that feareth is not made perfect in love." John Wesley emphasized that this is not an assurance about the future, but about the present state of the believer (Methodist theology teaches that apostasy can occur through sin or a loss of faith). Believers can be assured that they are the adopted children of God and will be with him for eternity if they continue in holiness by trusting in Christ and obeying God's commandments in this life.

The Pilgrim Nazarene Church, a Wesleyan Methodist denomination in the conservative holiness tradition, teaches:

The witness of the Spirit is that inward impression wrought on the soul whereby the Spirit of God immediately and directly assures our spirit that Bible conditions are met for salvation and the work of grace is complete in the soul (Romans 8:16). Therefore, the Spirit bears witness to both the salvation of the sinner and the sanctification of the believer (Hebrews 10: 14-15; (I John 5:10).

The Emmanuel Association of Churches, another Wesleyan Methodist denomination, states:

The witness of the Spirit is that inward impression wrought on the soul, whereby the Spirit of God immediately and directly assures our spirit that the Bible conditions are met for salvation and the work of grace is complete in the soul (Romans 8:15, 16). Therefore none should think they are either saved or sanctified until the Spirit of God has added His testimony (1 John 5:10). And if we take care to walk with God, and not grieve the Holy Ghost, we shall have an abiding testimony (Ephesians 4:30).

Methodist hymnody includes a number of Christians hymns dedicated to the doctrine of the Witness of the Spirit, such as Blessed Assurance (by Fanny Crosby), He is Mine (by James Rowe), and Wonderful Peace (by Haldor Lillenas).

=== Calvinistic Methodism ===
Calvinistic Methodists teach that "one who had been justified by faith could have the inner, personal assurance of their acceptance with God through the witness of the Spirit." In contrast, with respect to traditional Reformed theology, "Calvin believed the inner testimony of the Holy Spirit confirmed the authority of Scripture instead of confirming inwardly one's assurance of salvation; although Calvin believed the Spirit was the agent who joined the believer to Christ."

== Quakerism ==
The Central Yearly Meeting of Friends, a Holiness Quaker denomination, teaches in reference to the experiences of the New Birth and Perfection "that the Spirit of God gives to each born again person an inward witness that he is truly a child of God and to each truly sanctified person a witness that he is entirely sanctified." Quakers hold that the "witness of the Spirit is nothing more than the communication and assurance of God through the Spirit to the inward consciousness of the seeking and the believing soul that he has received that which he desired of God, that God has both hear the prayer and performed His work of grace in the heart (Rom 8;16; I Jn. 5:14, 15)."

== Baptists ==
Baptists teach that a "person is born again when he/she believes on the gospel of the Lord Jesus Christ (the death, burial, and resurrection) and he/she calls upon the name of the Lord." Those who have been born again, according to Baptist teaching, know that they are "a child of God because the Holy Spirit witnesses to them that they are."

== Lutheranism ==
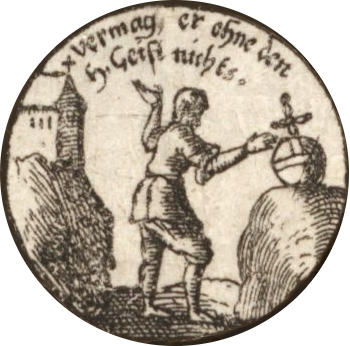
...man's will has some liberty to choose civil righteousness, and to work things subject to reason. But it has no power, without the Holy Ghost, to work the righteousness of God, that is, spiritual righteousness...—Augsburg Confession, Art. 18: Of Free Will

Lutheranism accepts monergism, which states that salvation is by God's act alone, and rejects the teaching that humans in their fallen state have a free will concerning spiritual matters. Lutherans believe that although humans have free will concerning civil righteousness, they cannot work spiritual righteousness without the Holy Spirit, since righteousness in the heart cannot be wrought in the absence of the Holy Spirit. Lutherans believe that the elect are predestined to salvation. According to Lutheranism, Christians should be assured that they are among the predestined. Lutherans believe that all who trust in Jesus alone can be certain of their salvation, for it is in Christ's work and his promises in which their certainty lies.

“We also believe, teach, and confess that, although the genuinely believing and truly regenerated persons retain much weakness and many shortcomings down to their graves, they still have no reason to doubt either the righteousness which is reckoned to them through faith or the salvation of their souls, but they must regard it as certain that for Christ’s sake, on the basis of the promises and the Word of the holy Gospel, they have a gracious God.” (FC, Epitome, Article III. Righteousness. Tappert p 474)

However, Lutherans disagree with those that make predestination the source of salvation rather than Christ's suffering, death, and resurrection. Unlike the Reformed (Calvinists), Lutherans do not believe in a predestination to damnation. Instead, Lutherans teach eternal damnation is a result of the unbeliever's sins, rejection of the forgiveness of sins, and unbelief, all of which occur when God chooses not to positively intervene during the unbeliever's lifetime. The central final hope of the Christian is "the resurrection of the body and the life everlasting" as confessed in the Apostles' Creed, but Lutherans also teach that, at death, Christian souls are immediately taken into the presence of Jesus in heaven, where they await this bodily resurrection and the second coming of Jesus on the Last Day.

== Reformed ==
Reformed Christianity (Calvinism) has had controversies over the doctrine of assurance, many however teach that believers may have assurance of their salvation especially through the work of the Holy Spirit and also by looking at the character of their lives. The idea that because good works necessarily result from true faith one can gain assurance by observing evidences of faith in their life is called the practical syllogism. If they believe God's promises and seek to live in accord with God's commands, then their good deeds done in response with a cheerful heart provide proof that can strengthen their assurance of salvation against doubts. This assurance is not, however, a necessary consequence of salvation, and such assurance may be shaken as well as strengthened.

The Westminster Confession of Faith affirms that assurance is attainable though the wait for it may be long:

...infallible assurance doth not so belong to the essence of faith but that a true believer may wait long and conflict with many difficulties before he be partaker of it: yet, being enabled by the Spirit to know the things which are freely given him of God, he may, without extraordinary revelation, in the right use of ordinary means, attain thereunto. And therefore it is the duty of everyone to give all diligence to make his calling and election sure; that thereby his heart may be enlarged in peace and joy in the Holy Ghost, in love and thankfulness to God, and in strength and cheerfulness in the duties of obedience, the proper fruits of this assurance...

Additionally, the Augustinian doctrines of grace regarding predestination are taught in the Reformed churches primarily to assure believers of their salvation since the Calvinist doctrines emphasize that salvation is entirely a sovereign gift of God apart from the recipient's choice, deeds, or feelings (compare perseverance of the saints).

The Marrow Brethren, being a group inside Reformed theology instead taught that assurance is to be grounded upon the gospel, while their opponents emphasized the human element in assurance.

== Anabaptism ==
Anabaptists who belong to Conservative Mennonite and New Order Amish communities teach the belief in assurance—"that one can know the state of his soul while on earth". This differs from the Old Order Amish understanding, who teach a "living hope" of salvation. Obedience to Jesus and a careful keeping of the Ten Commandments, in addition to loving one another and being at peace with others are seen as "earmarks of the saved".

== Similarities in Catholic teaching ==
The Catholic Church teaches that an infallible certitude of final salvation, as supposed in Calvinism, is not a usual experience, as seen in the sixteenth canon of the sixth session of the Council of Trent:

"If any one saith, that he will for certain, of an absolute and infallible certainty, have that great gift of perseverance unto the end, unless he have learned this by special revelation; let him be anathema."

In critiquing the Reformed doctrine of the assurance of salvation, prominent Catholic apologist Robert Sungenis notes a complication of the doctrine as it relates to the historic Protestant doctrine of Sola fide:

The burden is on the Reformed position because [it] says that a person can live his whole life thinking that he is justified by faith and yet come to the point in time where he stands at the judgment seat of God and finds out that he did not have the works that qualified the faith to be justifying faith and therefore God would say to him, "I'm sorry, you were never justified in the first place." So, if there’s anyone who lives under a cloud of terror, it’s the Reformed position because he never knows whether he did the proper works in order to qualify the faith that he needs for justification. And this is especially important because the Reformed position says that works can never enter into the faith that procures my justification, because works are all in sanctification. So, if works can never enter into the faith that I need for justification, how can they ever qualify the faith that I need for justification? So, he's in a double dilemma now.

Catholics recognize that a certainty of faith is ascribed to St. Paul (2 Cor 12,9) and speculate that the Virgin Mary also probably possessed it. Jesus Christ as man, however, did not need to believe since he knew it. Ludwig Ott argues that a high moral, human certainty of having sanctifying grace is possible, on the grounds that one is not conscious of an unforgiven grave sin, but by no means faith which is believing with divine certainty, and that with some probability one can locate positive signs of predestination, which does not mean that their lack be a sign of reprobation: He lists persistent action of the virtues recommended in the Eight Beatitudes, frequent Communion, active charity, love for Christ and the Church and devotion to the Blessed Virgin. Moreover, and especially, a Catholic can, and should, have certain hope for eternal salvation, which does not rest chiefly on a grace already received, but rather on prospective future forgiveness by God's omnipotence and mercy. The point in question is that however certain, the hope must retain its proper name and not be confused with faith. If together with a determination for sin, this hope is in danger of giving way to presumption.

In the Catholic tradition, a close equivalent to a doctrine of assurance has been a doctrine of final perseverance. Compliance with First Friday Devotions has sometimes been taught as a means to final perseverance.

== See also ==
- "Blessed Assurance", hymn by Fanny Crosby
- Conditional preservation of the saints
- Perseverance of the saints
