= Arthur Bedford (writer) =

English writer (1668-1745)

- Born: 8 September 1668; Tidenham, Gloucestershire, England
- Died: 13 August 1745 (aged 76)
- Resting place: Hoxton, London, England
- Education: Brasenose College, Oxford
- Occupations: Writer & vicar

Arthur Bedford (1668–1745), was an English miscellaneous writer and Vicar. He is most notable for his pamphlets against the Theatre and popular music.

== Life ==
Bedford was born at Tidenham in Gloucestershire on 8 September 1668. At the age of 16 he went to Brasenose College, Oxford, graduating B.A. in February 1688, and M.A. in July 1691. He was ordained in the Church of England in 1688. After acting as curate to Dr. Read of St. Nicholas Church, Bristol, he was presented by the town corporation to the Temple Church in 1692. He remained there for eight years, and was presented by Joseph Langton to the private living of Newton St. Loe in Somerset.

At Newton, Bedford spent 20 years, and was made chaplain to Wriothesley Russell, 3rd Duke of Bedford. In 1724 he was appointed chaplain to the hospital of the Haberdashers' Company at Hoxton. In 1730 Bedford attacked the stage by in a sermon at St Botolph's Aldgate, against the newly erected playhouse in Goodman's Fields; Odell was the proprietor, and the theatre, demolished in 1746, was associated with the career of David Garrick.

Late in life Bedford was chaplain to Frederick, Prince of Wales. He met his death after making observations on the comet of the year (13 August 1745), and was buried in the ground behind the hospital at Hoxton, where he had lived for 21 years.

== Works ==
Bedford joined Jeremy Collier and other pamphleteers in their crusade against the stage, and issued a series of tracts, of which one became notorious: A Serious Remonstrance in behalf of the Christian Religion against the Horrid Blasphemies and Impieties which are still used in the English Playhouses (1719). This work cited a number of scripture texts travestied, and 7,000 "immoral sentiments" collected from English dramatists, especially those of the previous four years. Bedford also gave his attention to church music; his aim was to promote a simpler style of religious music. He published The Temple Musick (Bristol, 1706), The Great Abuses of Music (1711), and The Excellency of Divine Music (1733).

Soon after moving to Newton, Bedford projected a work on chronology, taking up a suggestion in the preface to James Ussher's Annals that astronomy might simplify ancient chronology. He held back on hearing that Isaac Newton promised a work on the same subject, and then publishing in 1728 Animadversions on Sir I. Newton's book entitled "The Chronology of Ancient Kingdoms amended,", in reply to The Chronology of Ancient Kingdoms. He returned to the subject in 1741 Scripture Chronology demonstrated by Astronomical Considerations. These theories were discussed in the Republick of Letters (ii., iii., vi.); and the topic was aired further in the New Analysis of Chronology of William Hales.

Throughout his career Bedford published sermons on doctrinal questions. He was also an oriental scholar, assisting in preparing the Arabic psalter and New Testament for the Christians in Asia (there is a letter about this work from Bedford to Sir Hans Sloane, preserved in the Sloane manuscript No. 4037). Another production was the Horæ Mathematicæ Vacuæ, a treatise on Golden and Ecliptic Numbers (1743), written as a pastime during an attack of sciatica; the manuscript of this work was preserved in Sion College Library.
