= Practical syllogism (theology) =

In Reformed theology, the practical syllogism (Latin: syllogismus practicus) is a concept relating assurance of salvation to evidence in a person's life of such, such as good works and sanctification. The major premise of the syllogism is that some principle is characteristic of being a Christian. The minor premise is that the characteristic is present in oneself. The conclusion is that one is a Christian. Works are said to be the epistemological ground of faith and justification, rather than the ontological ground, because the evidences of faith only make faith apparent; they do not create it. John Calvin recognizes that outward signs of God's favor may confirm faith, but warns against inferring election from such signs. Faith is always to be placed in the preaching of the gospel rather than any outward action of the believer, but the outward actions may be a final confirmation of election. The concept is present in several Reformed confessions of faith. The Heidelberg Catechism includes assurance as one of the reasons Christians should perform good works. The Westminster Confession calls good works "the Fruits and Evidences of a true and lively faith."
